= Venus with Pistol =

1969 novel by Gavin Lyall

Venus With Pistol
- First Edition (UK)
- Author: Gavin Lyall
- Language: English
- Genre: Thriller novel
- Publisher: Hodder & Stoughton (UK); Scribners (US)
- Publication date: 1969
- Publication place: United Kingdom
- Media type: Print
- Pages: 238 pgs
- ISBN: 0-340-51580-5
- OCLC: 20168162
- Preceded by: Shooting Script
- Followed by: Blame the Dead

Venus With Pistol is a first person narrative novel by English author Gavin Lyall, first published in 1969.

== Explanation of title ==
A major plot point near the end of the novel turns on a painting by the Renaissance Venetian artist Giorgione, "Venus with Pistol". This painting is an invention of the author, but resembles the real-world painting Sleeping Venus, now at the Gemäldegalerie Alte Meister in Dresden. The historical accuracy of the pistol held by the fictional Venus turns out to be a matter of life and death to the narrator, a dealer in antique firearms.

== Reception ==
The Times Literary Supplement said that the novel “works up to beautiful tension and ingenuity.” Peter Parley in the London Spectator offered “all praise” for it, recommending it “for those with a thirst for the find in the attic and a bottle of scotch in the third drawer down.”

== Plot summary ==
Gilbert Kemp is dealer specializing in antique guns in London with a somewhat dubious background. He is approached by the mysterious Carlos MacGregor Garcia, a Nicaraguan and his employer, the very wealthy ex-professional tennis player Doña Margarita Umberto, who are traveling around Europe buying oil paintings to form a private collection which they allege will be donated to the Nicaraguan people. However, as many of the works are to be acquired from private collectors who do not wish the sale to be made public, and as many European governments would block the export of the historically valuable paintings, Kemp's services are needed in order to smuggle the paintings into Switzerland, from where they will be transported to Nicaragua in the diplomatic pouch.

It seems like a straightforward matter of art smuggling until Kemp is mugged on arrival in Zürich, and a priceless Cézanne is stolen. On his next commission in Amsterdam, he helps obtain an un-catalogued work of Vincent van Gogh, but the art expert certifying the painting is soon brutally murdered. Things heat up in Venice and culminate in Vienna where Kemp finally unravels the web of treachery and deceit that he has unwittingly stumbled into.
