= Judas Country =

1975 novel by Gavin Lyall

- First edition
- Author: Gavin Lyall
- Language: English
- Genre: Thriller novel
- Publisher: Hodder & Stoughton
- Publication date: 1975
- Publication place: United Kingdom
- Media type: Print
- Pages: 221
- ISBN: 0-340-19690-4
- OCLC: 20217818
- Preceded by: Blame The Dead
- Followed by: The Secret Servant

Judas Country is a first person narrative novel by English author Gavin Lyall, first published in 1975.

== Plot introduction ==
Roy Case, an ex-Royal Air Force military transport pilot makes a threadbare living flying charter cargo flights around the Mediterranean in an old Beechcraft Queen Air. His dreams of having his own airplane and own charter company rapidly fading due to age and lack of money, but at least he is flying. However, conditions rapidly spiral out of control when he lands in Cyprus. Not only did his employers go bankrupt, leaving him stranded and without pay, but his plane is impounded, he is mugged by mysterious assailants on a dark back street, and is trailed by an Israeli Mossad agent. When he finds that the cases clearly marked “champagne” that he was supposed to be flying to Lebanon contain machine guns instead, he suspects that things are going to get a lot worse.

When Case's friend Cavitt shows up, fresh from an Israeli prison, together with a mysterious Austrian archaeologist and his even more mysterious daughter, the plot thickens with hidden Crusader treasure, Lebanese gangsters, betrayal and murder.

== Reviews ==
Judas Country was the last of Lyall's aviation themed novels, and was considered one of his best in his obituary in the Guardian in January 2003.
