= De Havilland Dove =

British short-haul airliner produced 1946–1967

DH.104 Dove
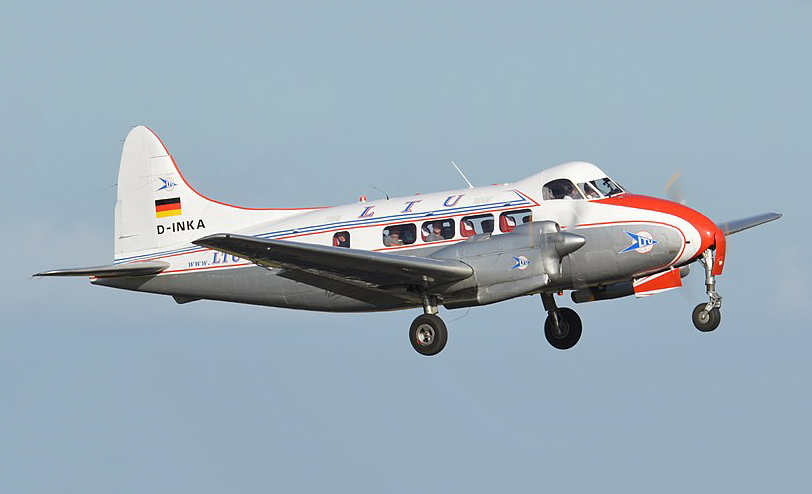
- A 1949 de Havilland Dove (2017 air show)

General information
- Type: Short-haul airliner
- National origin: United Kingdom
- Manufacturer: de Havilland
- Status: Limited service
- Number built: 544

History
- Manufactured: 1946–1967
- First flight: 25 September 1945; 81 years ago
- Developed into: de Havilland Heron de Havilland Australia DHA-3 Drover

The de Havilland DH.104 Dove is a British short-haul airliner developed and manufactured by de Havilland. The design, which was a monoplane successor to the pre-war Dragon Rapide biplane, came about from the Brabazon Committee report which, amongst other aircraft types, called for a British-designed short-haul feeder for airlines.

The Dove was a popular aircraft and is considered to be one of Britain's most successful postwar civil designs, with over 500 aircraft manufactured between 1946 and 1967. Several military variants were operated, such as the Devon by the Royal Air Force and the Sea Devon by the Royal Navy, and the type also saw service with a number of overseas military forces.

A longer four-engined development of the Dove, intended for use in the less developed areas of the world, was the Heron. A considerably re-designed three-engined variant of the Dove was built in Australia as the de Havilland Australia DHA-3 Drover.

== Development and design ==
The development team for the Dove was headed by Ronald Bishop, the creator of the de Havilland Mosquito, a wartime fighter-bomber, and the de Havilland Comet, the first commercial jet aircraft in the world. It had been developed to meet the Type VB requirement issued by the Brabazon Committee. In concept, the Dove was developed to be the replacement of the pre-war Dragon Rapide. It was also required to be competitive with the large numbers of surplus military transports in the aftermath of the Second World War, such as the Douglas DC-3. Unlike the Dragon Rapide, the Dove's structure was entirely metal. It featured innovations including constant-speed propellers, flaps, and a retractable tricycle undercarriage.

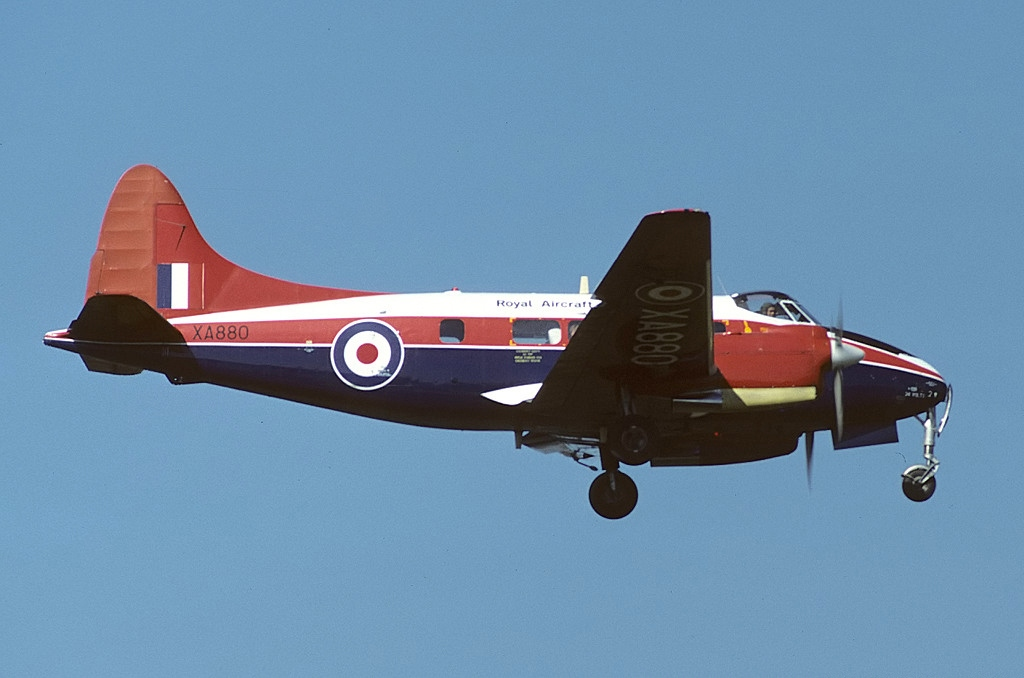
Royal Air Force DH-104 Devon C. Mk.2 piloted by the Duke of Edinburgh in the 1950s

In 1946, aviation magazine Flight praised the qualities of the newly developed Dove, noting its "modernity" as well as the aircraft's load-carrying capacity, safe engine-failure performance, and positive maintenance features. Considerable attention was paid to aspects of maintainability, many of the components being designed to be interchangeable and easy to remove or replace, such as the rudder, elevator, and power units; other areas include the mounting of the engines upon four quick-release pickup points, the routing of cables and piping, and the detachable wings and tail cone. The extensive use of special Redux metal-bonding adhesives reduced the need for riveting during the manufacturing process, reducing overall weight and air-skin friction.

While standard passenger versions of the Dove would carry between eight and eleven passengers, the cabin was designed to allow operators to convert between higher and lower density seating configurations. Features such as a single aircraft lavatory and an aft luggage compartment could be removed to provide increased seating. Various specialised models were produced for other roles, such as aerial survey, air ambulance, and flying classroom. A strengthened cabin floor structure was used to enable concentrated freight loads to be carried as well. The Dove could also serve as an executive transport, and in such a configuration it was capable of seating five passengers; the executive model proved to be popular with various overseas customers, particularly those in the United States.

The crew typically consisted of a pilot and radio operator, although rapidly removable dual flight controls could be installed for a second flying crewmember. A combination of large windows and a transparent perspex cabin roof provided a high level of visibility from the cockpit. From a piloting perspective, the Dove was noted for possessing easy flying qualities and mild stall qualities. A TKS anti-icing system was available for the Dove, involving an alcohol-based jelly delivered via porous metal strips embedded on the leading edges of the wings and tail.

== Operational service ==
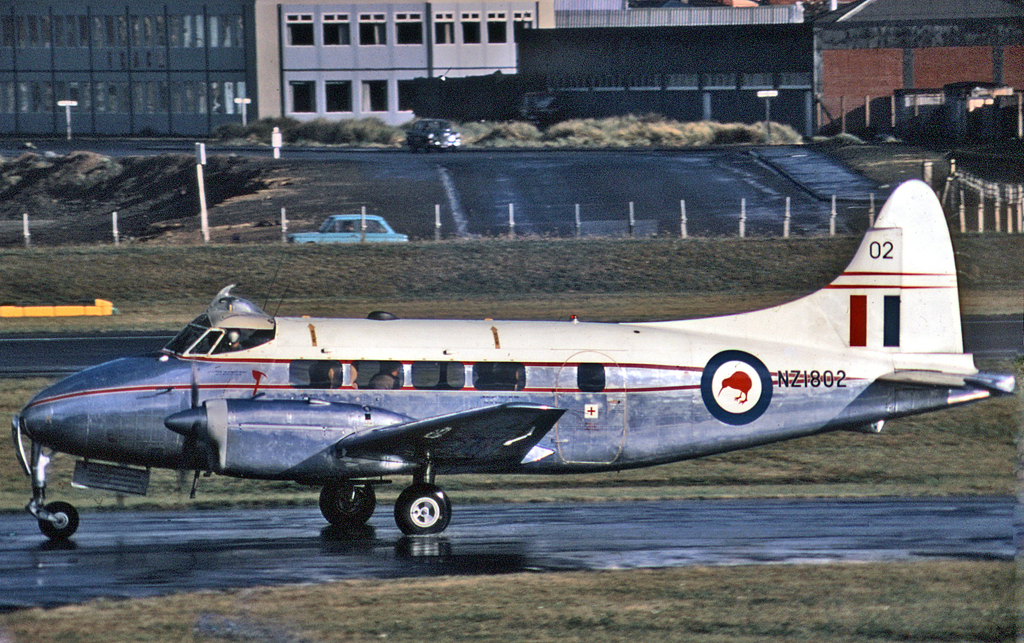
RNZAF Devon C.1 of 42 Squadron at Wellington Airport in 1971

The Dove first flew on 25 September 1945. In December 1946, the Dove entered service with Central African Airways. Initial production of the Dove took place at de Havilland's Hatfield factory, but from 1951 the aircraft were built at the company's Broughton facility near Chester. The final example of the type was delivered in 1967. Production of the Dove and its variants totalled 544 aircraft, including two prototypes, 127 military-orientated Devons and 13 Sea Devons.

From 1946, large numbers were sold to scheduled and charter airlines around the world, replacing and supplementing the pre-war designed de Havilland Dragon Rapide and other older designs. The largest order for the Dove was placed by Argentina, which ultimately took delivery of 70 aircraft, the majority of which were used by the Argentine Air Force. LAN Chile took delivery of twelve examples and these were operated from 1949 onwards until the aircraft were sold to several small regional airlines in the United States in 1954.

In excess of 50 Doves were sold to various operators in the United States by Jack Riley, an overseas distributor for the type. De Havilland later assumed direct control of U.S. sales, but did not manage to match this early commercial success for the type.

An early batch of 30 Devons was delivered to the Royal Air Force and they were used as VIP and light transports for over 30 years. The Royal New Zealand Air Force acquired 30 Devons between 1948 and 1954, and these remained in service for VIP, crew-training and light transport duties into the 1970s.

The Biafran Air Force operated a single Dove during the Nigerian Civil War; the aircraft was lost, to be subsequently found in 1970 on the premises of a school in Uli. A second US-registered Riley Dove, N477PM delivered in 1967 to Port Harcourt from Switzerland, never reached Biafra because it was stopped by Algerian authorities.

A Dove served as the first official aircraft of a Paraguayan head of state during the rule of Alfredo Stroessner. It was subsequently replaced by a de Havilland Canada DHC-6 Twin Otter.

A few Doves and civilianised Devons remained in use in 2011 in the United Kingdom, Canada, Germany and elsewhere with small commercial firms and with private pilot owners.

== Variants ==
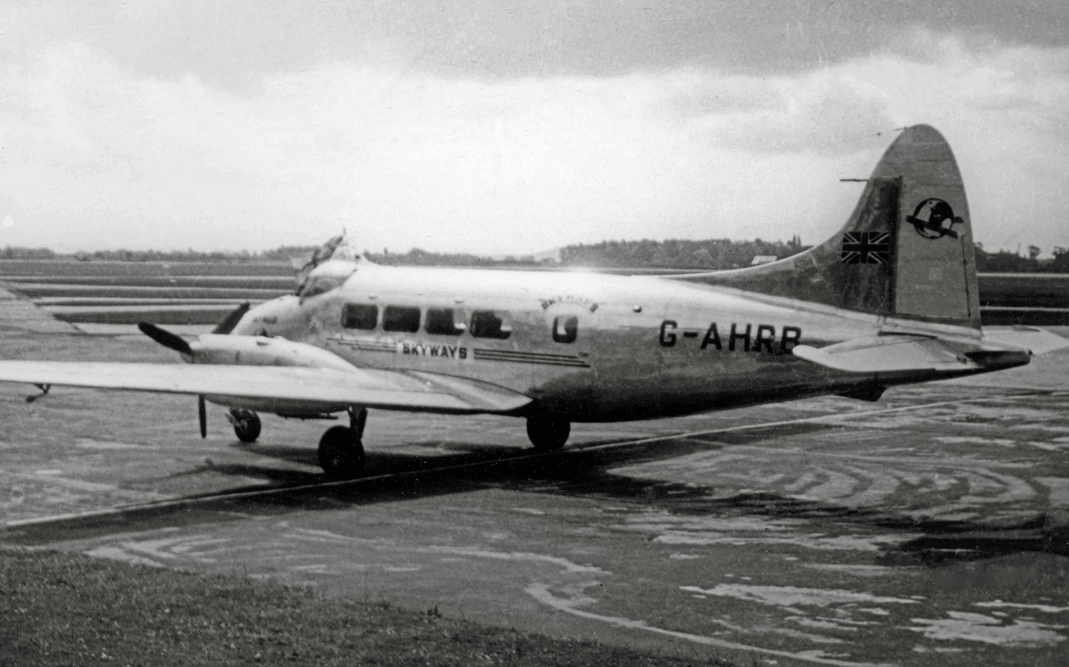
Early production Dove 1 of Skyways in June 1948

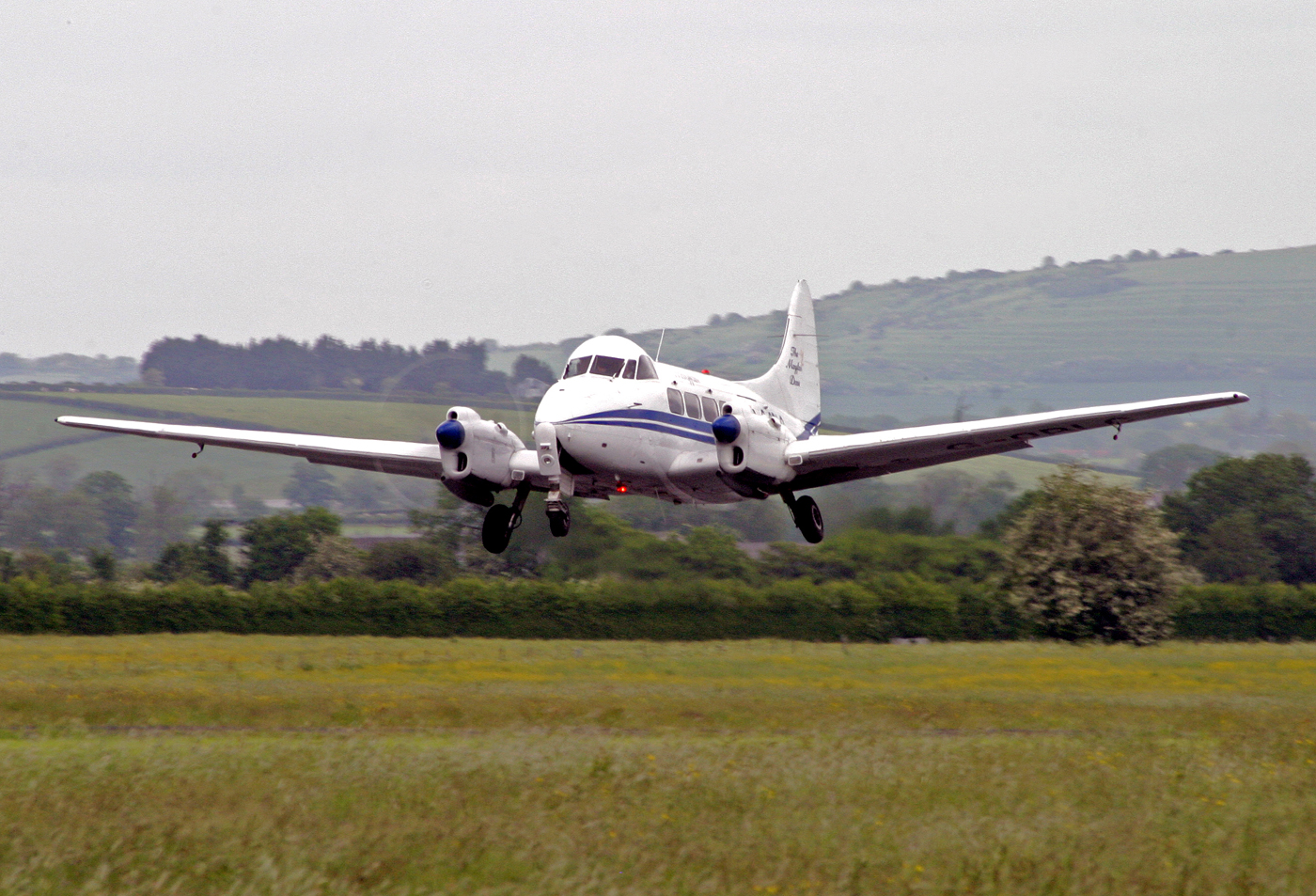
Dove G-OPLC in 2006

- Dove 1 : Light transport aircraft, seating up to 11 passengers. Powered by two 330 hp (250 kW)) de Havilland Gipsy Queen 70-3 piston engines.
  - Dove 1B : Dove Mk 1 aircraft, fitted with two 340 hp (250 kW) Gipsy Queen 70-4 piston engines.
- Dove 2 : Executive transport version, seating up to six passengers. Powered by two 330 hp (250 kW) Gipsy Queen 70-3 piston engines.
  - Dove 2B : Dove Mk 2 aircraft, fitted with two 340 hp (250 kW) Gipsy Queen 70-4 piston engines.
- Dove 3 : Proposed high-altitude survey version. Not built.
- Dove 4 : Military transport and communications version.
  - Devon C Mk 1 : Transport and communications version for the RAF.
  - Devon C Mk 2 : Transport and communications version for the RAF. Re-engined version of the Devon C Mk 1 fitted with revised cockpit and two 400 hp (300 kW) Gipsy Queen 175 piston engines.
  - Sea Devon C Mk 20 : Transport and communications version for the Royal Navy.
- Dove 5 : Uprated version of the Dove 1, seating up to 11 passengers, with two 380 hp (280 kW) Gipsy Queen 70 Mk2 piston engines.
- Dove 6 : Uprated version of the Dove 2, a six seat executive transport aircraft, powered by two 380 hp (280 kW) Gipsy Queen 70 Mk2 piston engines.
  - Dove 6B : Stressed for operations at a maximum weight of 8,500 lb (3,900 kg).

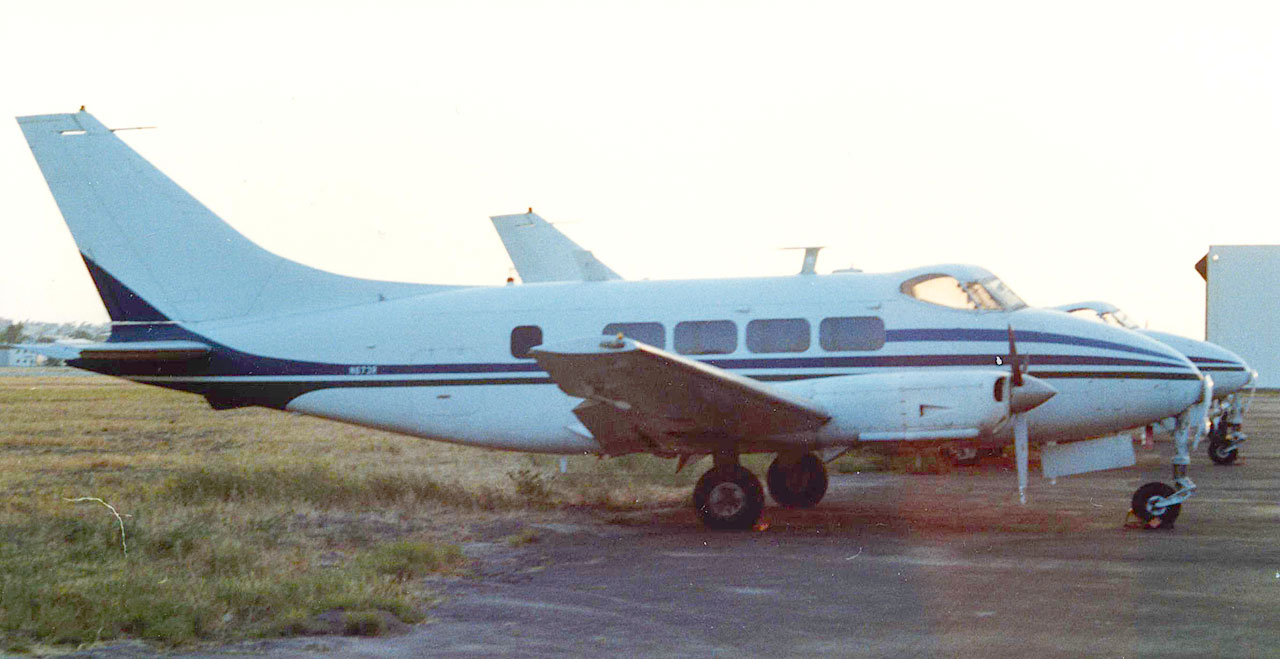
Riley Dove with Lycoming engines and taller swept fin at Long Beach airport in 1987

- Dove 7 : Uprated version of the Dove 5, seating up to 11 passengers, fitted with two 400 hp (300 kW) Gipsy Queen 70 Mk3 piston engines and revised cockpit.
- Dove 8 : Uprated version of the six seat executive Dove 6, fitted with two 400 hp (300 kW) Gipsy Queen 70 Mk3 piston engines and revised cockpit.
  - Dove 8A : Five seater version of the Dove 8 for the U.S. market.

- Dove Custom 800 : A customised version of the Dove, carried out by Horton and Horton in Fort Worth, Texas. Typically outfitted with removable bulkheads, various custom interiors were available, including airliner-orientated configurations.

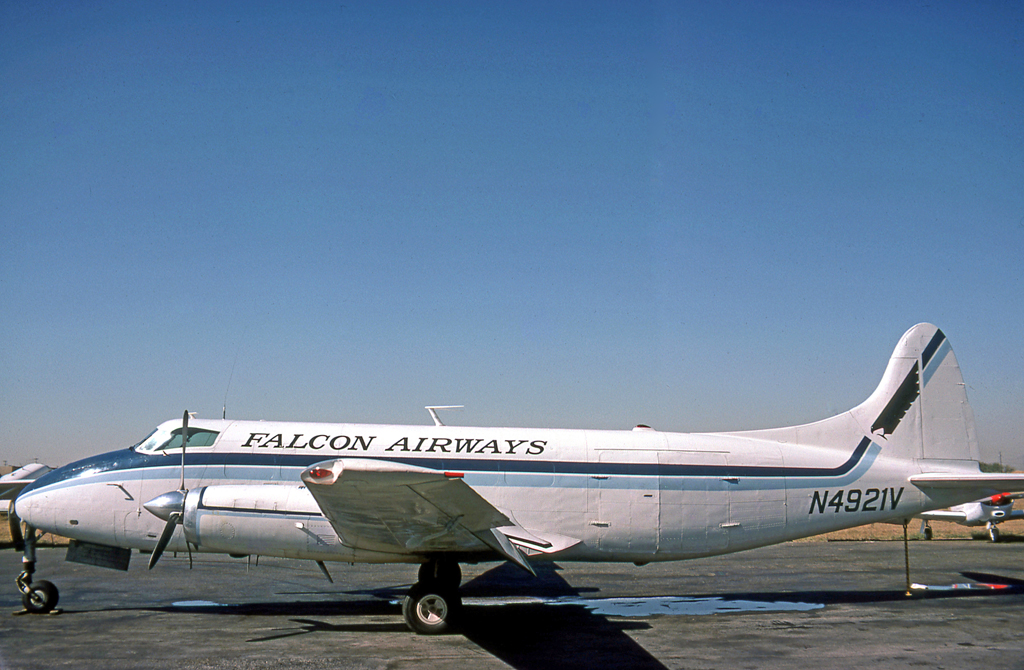
Carstedt CJ600F stretched cargo conversion of a Dove 1 fitted with TPE331 turboprops, at Dallas Addison in 1975

- Carstedt Jet Liner 600 : Conversions of the Dove, carried out by Carstedt Inc, of Long Beach, California, USA. The aircraft were fitted with two 605 hp (451 kW) Garrett AiResearch TPE331 turboprop engines. The fuselage was lengthened by 87 in (2,200 mm) to accommodate 18 passengers. Only six aircraft were converted before one aircraft was lost due to a mid-air structural failure.
- Riley Turbo Executive 400 / Riley Turbo-Exec 400 / Riley Dove 400 : Conversions of the Dove, carried out by Riley Aeronautics Corp in the United States. The aircraft were fitted with two 400 hp (300 kW) Lycoming IO-720-A1A flat-eight piston engines. Riley conversions were fitted with a taller swept vertical fin and rudder but those retaining the standard DH fin were named Riley Dove 2 . During the late 1960s, Riley Aeronautics, at the Executive Airport in Fort Lauderdale, Florida, did interior refitting work on both the De Havilland Dove and the Heron.

== Operators ==
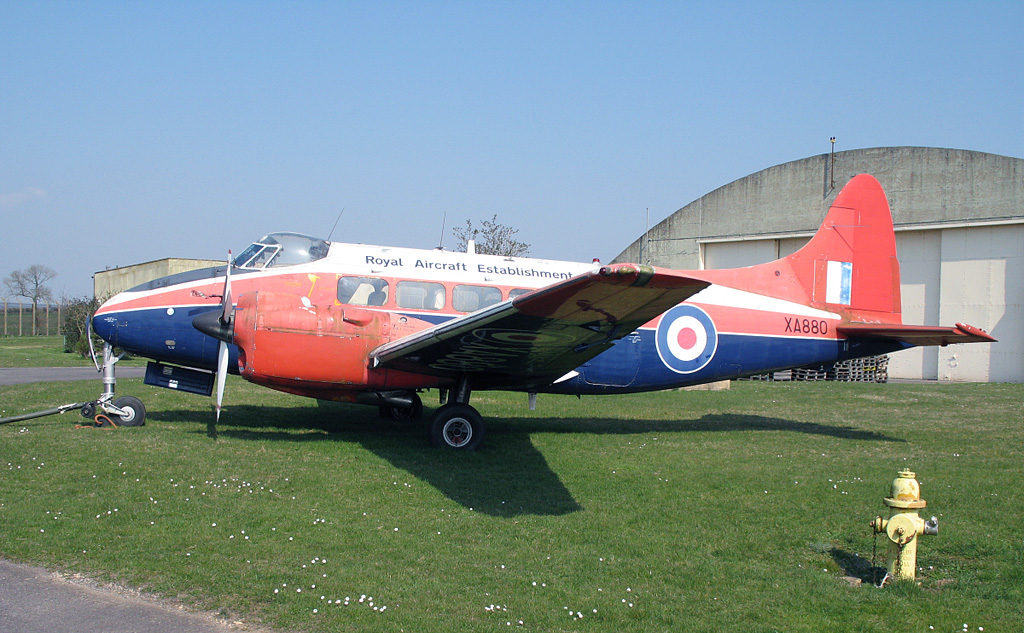
de Havilland Devon

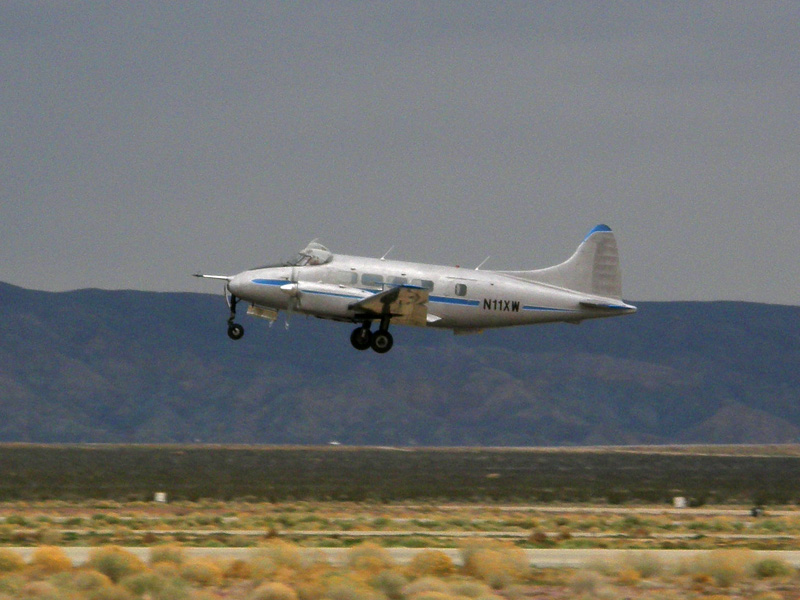
Dove 6A belonging to the National Test Pilot School departs the Mojave Airport, 2009

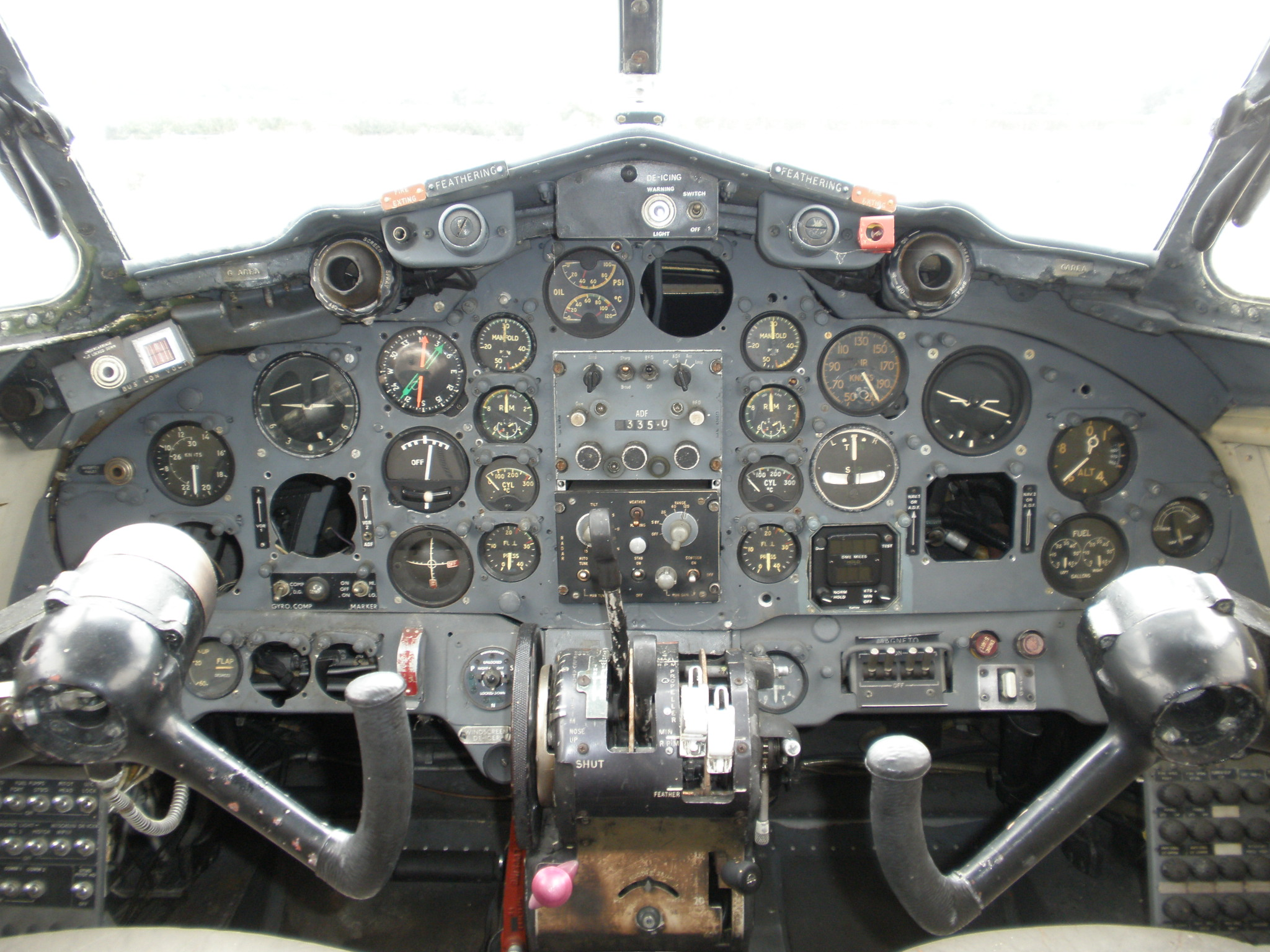
Cockpit

=== Civil operators ===
Australia

- Airlines of Western Australia
- Bay of Plenty Airlines
- MacRobertson Miller Airlines
- Mandated Airlines
- Northern Territory Medical Service
- Royal Flying Doctor Service
- Southern Airlines

Bahrain

- Gulf Aviation

Belgium

- BIAS
- SABENA

Burma

- Union of Burma Airways

Chile

- LAN-Chile

Denmark

- Cimber Air
- Falcks Flyvetjeneste

Gambia

- West African Airways Corporation

Germany

- LTU

Ghana

- West African Airways Corporation

India

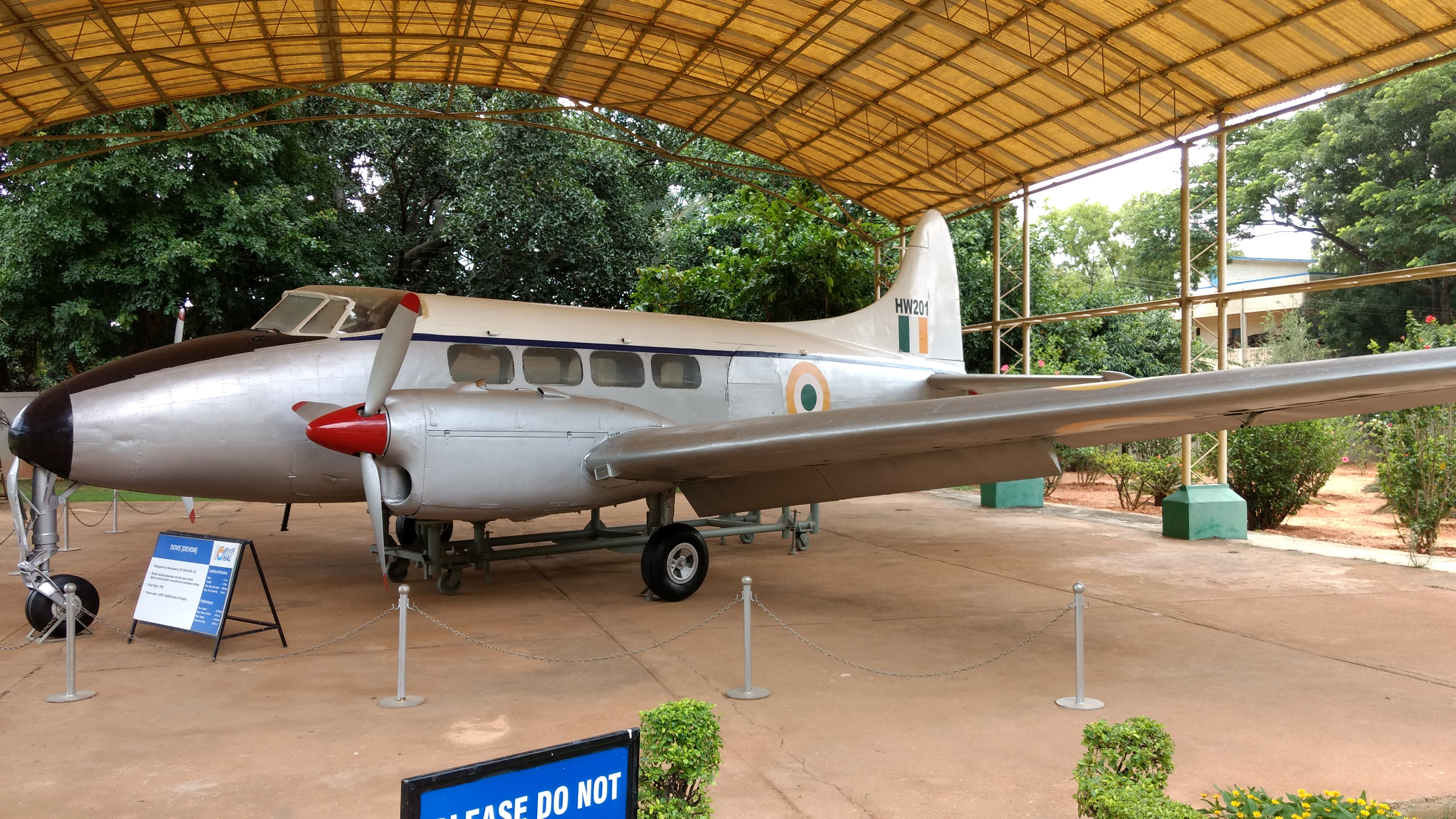
Dove with tail marking HW201 on display at HAL Aerospace Museum at Bengaluru, India

- Airways (India) Limited
- Indian National Airways
- Government of Madras

Indonesia

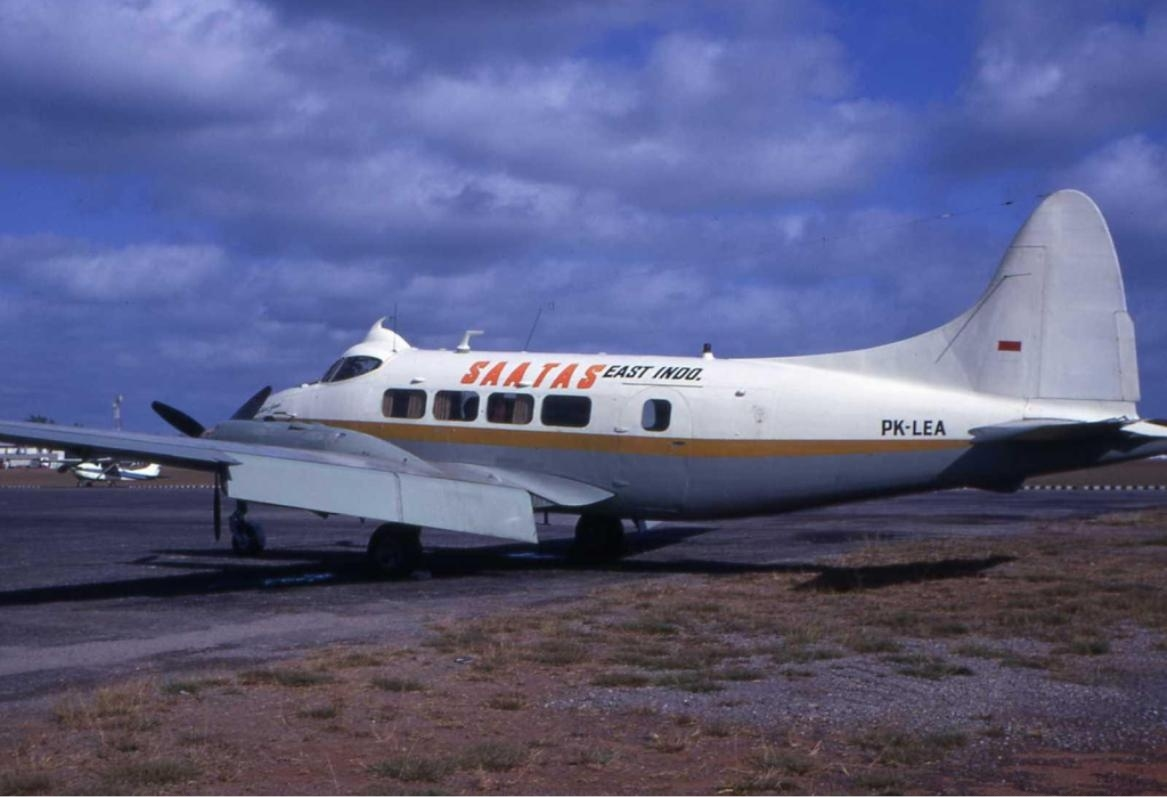
De Havilland Dove of the SAATAS East Indonesia at Darwin Airport, 1980s

- SAATAS East Indonesia

Iraq

- Iraq Petroleum Company

Japan

- Nippon Helicopter and Aeroplane
- Far East Airlines

Kenya, Uganda, Tanganyika and Zanzibar

- East African Airways

Netherlands

- Martinair (then called Martin's Air Charter)

Nigeria

- West African Airways Corporation

Southern Rhodesia

- Central African Airways

Portugal

- SATA – Sociedade Açoreana de Transportes Aéreos

Portuguese Angola

- AERANGOL - Aeronaves de Angola
- ETASA - Empresa de Transportes Aéreos do Sul de Angola
- SATAL - Sociedade Anónima de Transportes Aéreos

Portuguese Cape Verde

- ACCV - Aero Clube de Cabo Verde
- TACV - Transportes Aéreos de Cabo Verde

Portuguese Mozambique

- DETA - Divisão e Exploração de Transportes Aéreos

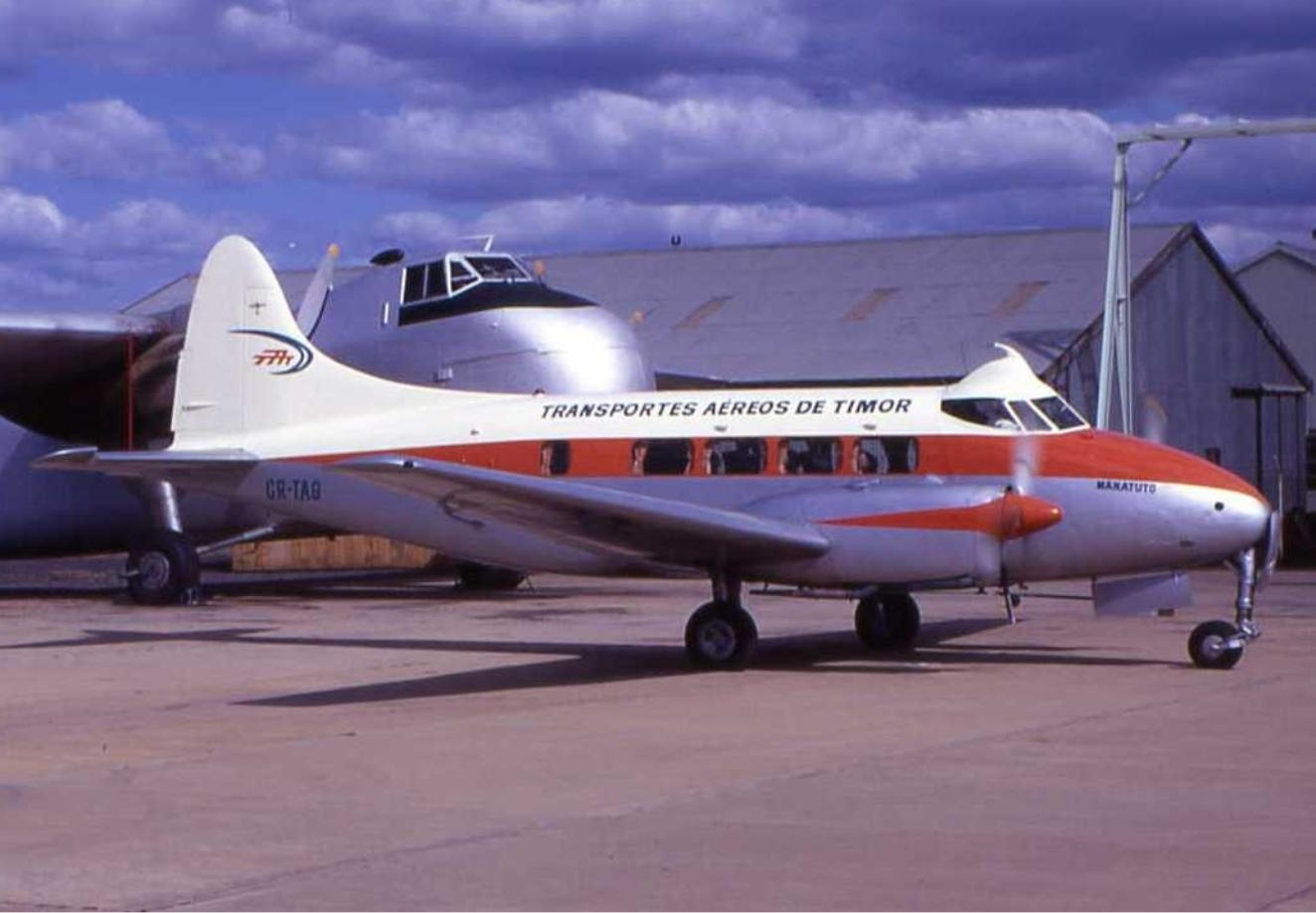
Transportes Aéreos de Timor CR-TAG Dove at Bankstown Airport in the early 1970s. This aircraft is now in the Darwin Aviation Museum. A Bristol Freighter is also present

Portuguese Timor

- TAT - Transportes Aéreos de Timor

Sierra Leone

- West African Airways Corporation

South Africa

- Comair (South Africa) operated 2 aircraft.
- South African Airways

Sudan

- Sudan Airways

United Kingdom

- Airviews Ltd
- BBC Air
- BOAC (for training and communications)
- Bristow Helicopters
- British Midland
- British Westpoint Airlines
- Cambrian Airways
- Channel Airways (scheduled services)
- Dan-Air (scheduled services)
- Hunting Aerosurveys Ltd
- Hunting-Clan Air Transport
- Melba Airways
- Morton Air Services
- Olley Air Services
- Skyways
- Silver City Airways
- CAA Flying Unit

United States

- Air Wisconsin
- Apache Airlines
- Catalina Airlines
- Golden Isles Airlines
- Gulf Coast Airways
- Illini Airlines
- Midwest Air Charter
- National Test Pilot School
- Statewide Airlines
- Superior Airlines
- TAG Airlines

Yugoslavia

- Jugoslovenski Aero-Transport (JAT).

=== Military operators ===
Argentina

- Argentine Air Force
- Argentine Coast Guard
- Argentine Federal Police

Belgian Congo

- Force Publique

Biafra

- Biafran Air Force – One Riley-converted Riley 400 was abandoned at Port Harcourt by Bristow Helicopters at the outbreak of civil war in 1967 and seized by Biafran mercenaries.

Brazil
Ceylon

- Royal Ceylon Air Force – Six series 5 delivered between 1955 and 1958.

Egypt

- Egyptian Air Force – Six series 1 delivered between 1947 and 1948.

Ethiopia

- Imperial Ethiopian Air Force – 3, two former Ethiopian government series 1 transferred to air force in 1952 and one new series 7 in 1965.

India

- Indian Air Force – 20
- Indian Naval Air Arm

Iraq

- Royal Iraqi Air Force – 7 – One Series 1 for the Royal Flight delivered in 1947 followed by six Series 1 in 1948.
  - Royal Flight
  - No. 3 Transport Squadron

Ireland

- Irish Air Corps – 4, one series 1B in 1953, one series 5 in 1959, one series 7 in 1962, and series 8 modified for radio and radar calibration in 1970.

Jordan

- Royal Jordanian Air Force – 6 – Two Series 1 transferred from Jordan National Airlines, two aircraft intended for Jordan National Airlines converted to Series 5 and transferred to air force, two new Series 7s delivered in 1965
- Royal Flight

Katanga

- Force Aérienne Katangaise – 6

Kuwait

- Kuwait Air Force – Two series 5 transferred to the air force in 1962.

Kingdom of Laos

- Royal Lao Air Force

Lebanon

- Lebanese Air Force – One series 1 delivered in 1951, a further aircraft on order was not delivered.

Malaysia

- Royal Malaysian Air Force- 5 – Three series 8 delivered in 1061 followed by two former RNZAF Devon C.1s delivered in 1968

New Zealand

- Royal New Zealand Air Force – 30
  - No. 42 Squadron RNZAF

Pakistan

- Pakistan Air Force – Two, one former Government of Sind series 1 used until 1962, a new VIP series 2 delivered in 1949.
  - No. 12 Squadron

Paraguay

- Paraguayan Air Force- One former Argentine Air Force series 1 delivered in 1963.

South Africa

- South African Air Force – Nine series 1 delivered in 1949.
  - No. 28 Squadron

Sweden

- Swedish Air Force – One Series 1 delivered in 1947 and sold in 1967.

United Kingdom

- Aeroplane and Armament Experimental Establishment
- Empire Test Pilots' School
- Royal Aircraft Establishment
- Royal Air Force- 30 series 4 aircraft as the Devon C.1 from 1948.
  - No. 21 Squadron RAF
  - No. 26 Squadron RAF
  - No. 31 Squadron RAF
  - No. 32 Squadron RAF
  - No. 60 Squadron RAF
  - No. 207 Squadron RAF
  - Bomber Command Communications Squadron
  - Coastal Command Communication Squadron
  - Maintenance Command Communications Squadron
  - Metropolitan Communications Squadron
  - Northern Communications Squadron
  - Queen's Flight
  - Southern Communications Squadron
  - Technical Training Command Communications Flight
  - Western Communications Squadron
- Royal Radar Establishment at Pershore
- Fleet Air Arm – Ten former civil aircraft delivered in 1955 as the Sea Devon C.20, later another three were bought.
  - 728 Naval Air Squadron
  - 750 Naval Air Squadron
  - 765 Naval Air Squadron
  - 771 Naval Air Squadron
  - 781 Naval Air Squadron

Venezuela

- Venezuelan Air Force – One former civil series 2A transferred to air force in 1968.

Yugoslavia

- SFR Yugoslav Air Force – Two former Jugoslav Air Transport series 2B transferred to air force.

== Accidents and incidents ==
- On 13 May 1948, a Dove 1 G-AJOU of Skyways Limited crashed near Privas, France. All four on board killed, including the Earl Fitzwilliam and Kathleen Cavendish, the second daughter of Joseph P. Kennedy.
- On 14 March 1949, a De Havilland DH.104 Dove 1 of Union of Burma Airways, registration XY-ABO, crashed in the Gulf of Mottama (Martaban) en route from Mingaladon Airport to Moulmein (Mawlamyine) Airport . Lost 9 passengers and 2 crew (Capt P H Sparrow, pilot and L.A. Stephens, radio officer).
- On 15 October 1951, Dove VH-AQO operated by Airlines (WA) Ltd crashed near its destination, Kalgoorlie, Western Australia, on a flight from Perth. All seven occupants were killed. The accident was eventually attributed to fatigue cracking of the wing spar.
- On 12 November 1953, Argentine Air Force Dove T-82 crashed mid-air with Junkers Ju 52 T-159 near Villa Mugueta, Santa Fe, Argentina; with no survivors. Among the 20 dead was Vice-commodore Gustavo Argentino Marambio, pioneer of Argentine flights to Antarctica.
- On 1 December 1954, a Dove 2B VH-DHD of De Havilland Australia crashed at Narellan, near Camden, Australia. Reginald Adsett, a chief examiner of airmen for the Australian Civil Aviation Department was killed and two others seriously injured.
- On 15 January 1958, Dove G-AOCE of Channel Airways crashed on approach to Ferryfield Airfield, Lydd, Kent, United Kingdom, both engines having stopped due to fuel starvation due to fuel mismanagement. All seven on board survived.
- On 13 April 1966, Abdul Salam Arif, the President of Iraq, was killed when the Iraqi Air Force de Havilland DH.104 Dove 1, RF392, he was onboard crashed in southern Iraq. The loss of the aircraft was suspected to be due to sabotage by Ba'athist elements within the Iraqi military.
- On 11 April 1968, Dove 1 Z-900 of the Egyptian Air Force was lost over the Sahara desert following instrument failure. The aircraft was not found until 1 June 1971, all nine occupants having died of starvation.
- On 28 January 1970, TAG Airlines Flight 730 crashed over Lake Erie after having suffered an inflight structural failure, killing all nine people aboard.
- On 9 April 1970, Dove G-AVHV of McAlpine Aviation crashed into a residential property on approach into Pendeford Airfield, Wolverhampton, West Midlands due to pilot error. The crash caused the deaths of both onboard and one on the ground.
- On 6 May 1971, Apache Airlines Flight 33 from Tucson, AZ to Phoenix, AZ crashed near Coolidge, AZ after suffering an inflight structural failure, killing all twelve people aboard.
- On 9 July 1983 a privately owned Dove, G-AMYP, suffered engine failure on takeoff at Shoreham Airport, crashing into the banks of the River Adur. The pilot and sole occupant, Keith Wickenden, died on impact.
- On 3 December 1993, a Dove VH-DHD chartered dinner flight lost engine power during takeoff, resulting in the aircraft crashing into five houses in Essendon, a suburb containing the original airport for Melbourne Australia. There were no fatalities amongst either the ten occupants of the Dove nor anyone on the ground, but all aboard the aircraft and one pedestrian were taken to hospital.
- On 3 February 2006, New Zealand based Devon, ZK-UDO (ex-RNZAF Devon 21) suffered a hard landing at RNZAF Base Ohakea due to an asymmetrical flap deployment on approach. All passengers and crew survived with only minor injuries; the aircraft was damaged beyond economical repair.

== Aircraft on display ==
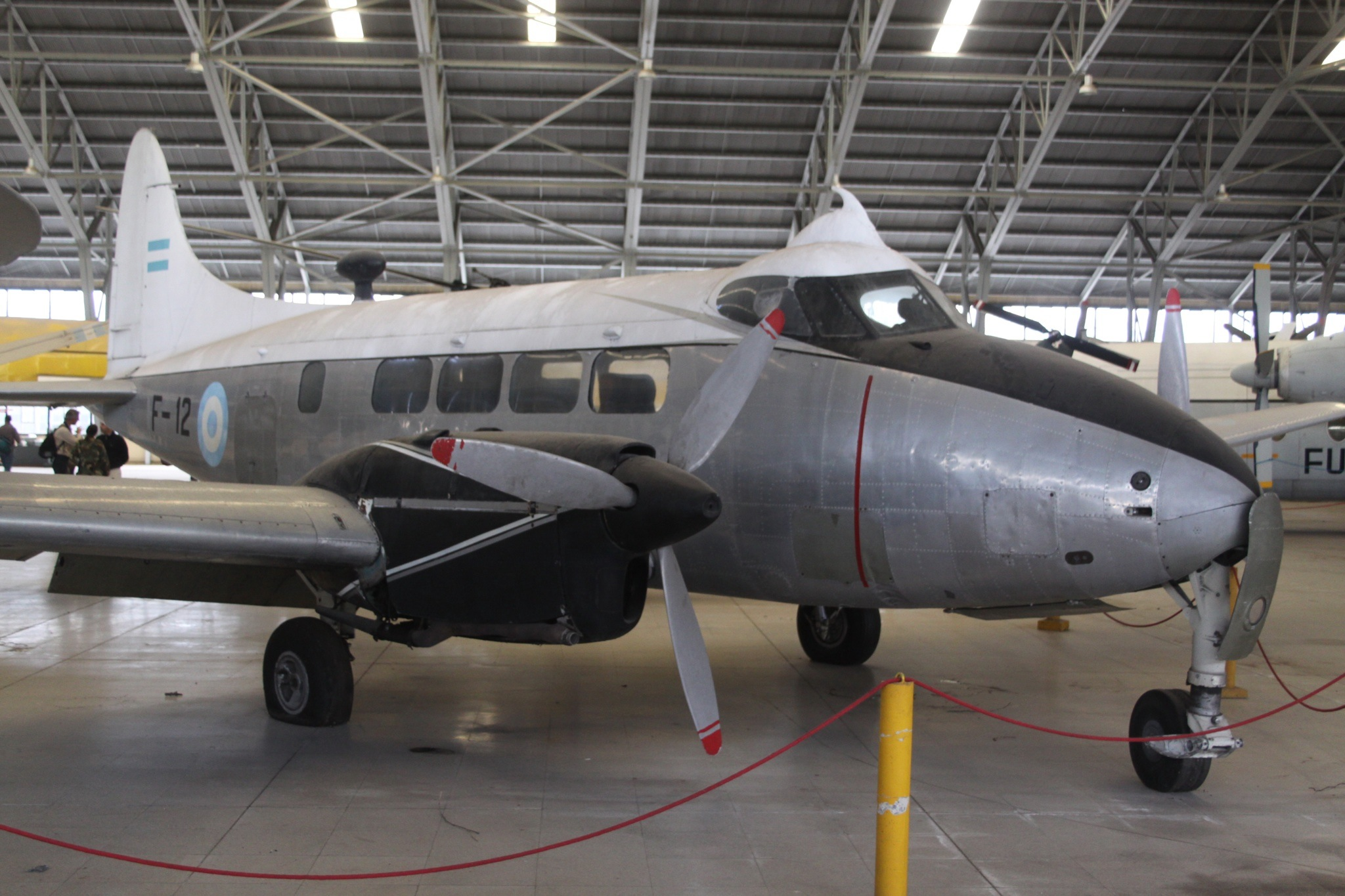
Dove 1 on display at the Museo Nacional de Aeronautica de Argentina

Argentina

- F-12 – Dove 1 on static display at the Museo Nacional de Aeronautica de Argentina in Morón, Buenos Aires.
- LV-XZX – Dove 1 on static display at the Neuquén Aeroclub in Neuquén.

Australia

- VH-MAL – Dove 1 on static display at the Queensland Air Museum in Caloundra, Queensland.
- CR-TAG – Dove 1B on static display at the Darwin Aviation Museum in Darwin, Northern Territory.
- VH-ABM – Dove ? on static display at the rear of Ballarat Aviation Museum in Ballarat, Victoria sporting very faded Penguin Express livery, minus rear stabilisers and tail with much needing fixing.
- VH-DHH – Dove 6 on static display at the Central Australian Aviation Museum in Gillen, Northern Territory.

Austria

- A partial airframe (fuselage and part of the left wing) is in the Technisches Museum Wien, Vienna.

Denmark

- OY-DHZ – Dove 6 on display at the Danmarks Flymuseum in Skjern, Ringkøbing-Skjern.

Germany

- G-ARUE – Dove 7 on static display at the Technik Museum Sinsheim in Sinsheim, Baden-Württemberg.

India

- HW201 – Devon C.1 on static display at the HAL Aerospace Museum in Bangalore, Karnataka.
- IN124 – Devon C.1 on static display at the Naval Aviation Museum in Vasco da Gama, Goa.

Netherlands

- XJ350 – Sea Devon C.20 on static display at the Aviodrome in Lelystad, Flevoland.

New Zealand

- NZ1802 – Devon C.1 on static display at the Classic Flyers Museum in Mount Maunganui, Bay of Plenty.
- NZ1803 – Devon C.1 on static display at the Air Force Museum of New Zealand in Wigram, Canterbury.
- NZ1829 – Devon C.1 on display at the Ashburton Aviation Museum in Ashburton, Canterbury.
- ZK-RNG – Dove 1B on static display at the National Transport and Toy Museum in Wānaka, Otago.

South Africa

- ZS-BCC – Dove 6 on display at the South African Airways Museum in Germiston, Gauteng.

Sri Lanka

- CS401 – Dove 5 on static display at the Sri Lanka Air Force Museum in Ratmalana, Colombo.
- CS402 – Dove 5 on static display at the Sri Lanka Air Force Museum in Ratmalana, Colombo
- CS404 – Dove 5 on static display at the Sri Lanka Air Force Museum in Ratmalana, Colombo

Sweden

- SE-EUR – Dove 6 on display at the Arlanda Flygsamlingar in Sigtuna, Stockholm.
- 46001 – Tp 46 under restoration at the Österlens Flygmuseum in Östra Vemmerlöv, Skåne.

United Arab Emirates

- G-ARDE - Dove 6 on display at the Al Mahatta Museum in Sharjah and painted as G-AJPR.

United Kingdom

- D-IFSB – Dove 2B on static display at the Fishburn Historic Aviation Centre in Fishburn, County Durham.
- G-AHRI – Dove 1 on static display at the Newark Air Museum in Newark-on-Trent, Nottinghamshire.
- G-ALCU – Dove 2 on static display at the Midland Air Museum in Baginton, Warwickshire.
- G-ALFU – Dove 6 on static display at the Imperial War Museum Duxford in Duxford, Cambridgeshire.
- G-ANOV – Dove 6 on static display at the National Museum of Flight in East Fortune, East Lothian.
- G-ANUW – Dove 6 on static display at the East Midlands Aeropark in Castle Donington, Leicestershire.
- G-AREA – Dove 8 on static display at the de Havilland Aircraft Museum in London Colney, Hertfordshire.
- VP952 – Devon C.1 on static display at the Royal Air Force Museum Cosford in Cosford, Shropshire.
- VP967 – Devon C.2 on display at the Yorkshire Air Museum in Elvington, York.

United States

- N234D – Dove 6A in storage at the Mid-Atlantic Air Museum in Reading, Pennsylvania.
- N557JC – Dove 5A in storage at the Mid-Atlantic Air Museum in Reading, Pennsylvania.

Venezuela

- 2531 – Dove 2A on static display at the Aeronautics Museum of Maracay in Maracay, Aragua.

== Appearances in fiction ==
A de Havilland Dove featured prominently in the Gavin Lyall adventure novel Shooting Script. G-ARBH features in the 1962 film The Wrong Arm of the Law as the personal aeroplane of Peter Sellers' character Pearly Gates.

Near the beginning of the 1980 film Flash Gordon, travel agent Dale Arden and New York Jets quarterback Flash Gordon board a de Havilland Dove which subsequently crashes into a greenhouse adjacent to the secret laboratory of Dr. Hans Zarkov. The atmospheric disturbances that caused the crash were instigated by planet Mongo's ruler Ming the Merciless. The crash sequence was filmed using a 30-inch-long model Dove diving into a miniature landscape.

In season 2, episode 9 of the British TV series The Crown, Prince Philip is portrayed as flying a de Havilland Dove.

In Simon Templar's Saint episode Queen's Ransom, Lycoming engined Riley Dove 2, G-ASUW appears in executive layout.

== Specifications (Dove 7) ==
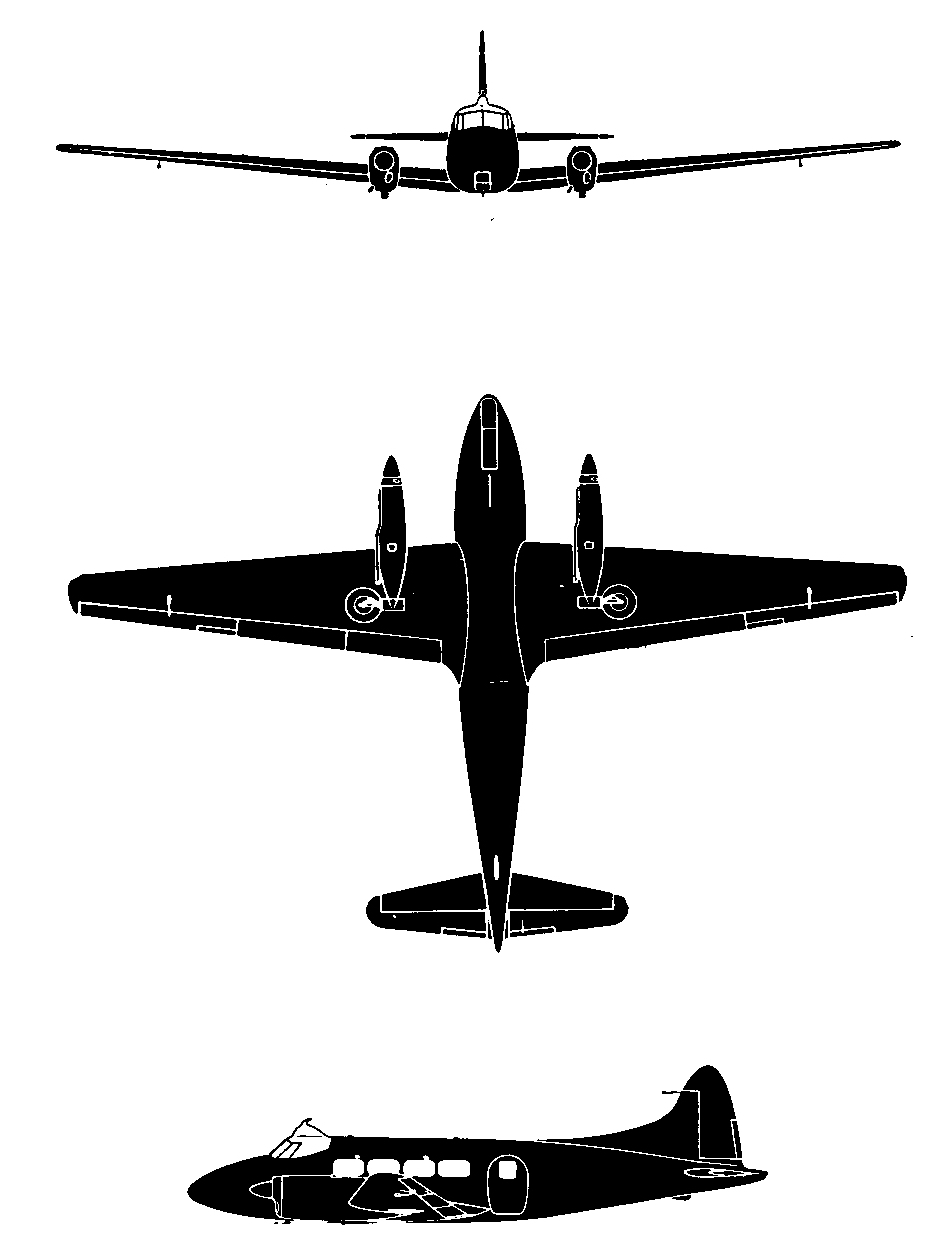
de Havilland Dove Srs 5

Data from Flight International, Jane's All The World's Aircraft 1966–67, Jane's All the World's Aircraft 1967–68

General characteristics

- Crew: 2
- Capacity: 8 passengers / 1,477 lb (670 kg) max payload
- Length: 39 ft 3 in (11.96 m)
- Wingspan: 57 ft 0 in (17.37 m)
- Height: 13 ft 4 in (4.06 m)
- Wing area: 335 sq ft (31.1 m^{2})
- Airfoil: root:RAF 34 mod (18.3%); tip: RAF 34 mod (14.5%)
- Empty weight: 6,325 lb (2,869 kg)
- Max takeoff weight: 8,950 lb (4,060 kg)
- Maximum landing weight: 8,500 lb (3,856 kg)
- Fuel capacity: 168 imp gal (202 US gal; 764 L) in four wing tanks, with provision for a 52 imp gal (62 US gal; 236 L) in the rear luggage compartment
- Powerplant: 2 × de Havilland Gipsy Queen 70 Mk.3 6-cylinder air-cooled inverted in-line piston engines, 400 hp (300 kW) each
- Propellers: 3-bladed Hawker Siddeley Hydromatic, 7 ft 6 in (2.29 m) diameter constant-speed feathering propellers

Performance

- Maximum speed: 230 mph (370 km/h, 200 kn)
- Cruise speed: 187 mph (301 km/h, 162 kn) maximum at 8,000 ft (2,438 m) and 8,500 lb (3,856 kg) AUW

138 mph (120 kn; 222 km/h) economical, 60% power, 8,000 ft (2,438 m) and 8,500 lb (3,856 kg) AUW

- Stall speed: 74 mph (119 km/h, 64 kn) flaps and gear down

94 mph (82 kn; 151 km/h) flaps up

- Range: 880 mi (1,420 km, 760 nmi) full fuel, 1,398 lb (634 kg) payload, 45 minutes hold and 5% reserve

385 mi (335 nmi; 620 km) full fuel, 2,000 lb (907 kg) payload, 45 minutes hold and 5% reserve

- Service ceiling: 21,700 ft (6,600 m)
- Rate of climb: 1,135 ft/min (5.77 m/s) at sea level

295 ft/min (1.5 m/s) with one engine inoperative

- Wing loading: 26.7 lb/sq ft (130 kg/m^{2})
- Power/mass: 0.0893 hp/lb (0.1468 kW/kg)
- Take-off distance to 50 ft (15 m): 2,320 ft (707 m)
- Landing distance from 50 ft (15 m): 1,910 ft (582 m)

== See also ==
Related development

- de Havilland Heron
- de Havilland Australia DHA-3 Drover

Aircraft of comparable role, configuration, and era

- CSS-12
