= Midnight Plus One =

1965 novel by Gavin Lyall

- First edition (UK)
- Author: Gavin Lyall
- Language: English
- Genre: Thriller novel
- Publisher: Hodder & Stoughton (UK); Scribner (US)
- Publication date: 1965
- Publication place: United Kingdom
- Media type: Print
- Pages: 256
- Preceded by: The Most Dangerous Game
- Followed by: Shooting Script

Midnight Plus One is a first-person narrative novel by English author Gavin Lyall, first published in 1965.

== Plot introduction ==
Lewis Cane is an ex-SOE operative who worked with the French Resistance against Nazi Germany. He stayed in Paris after the end of World War II, making a somewhat precarious living as a business expediter. One day he is approached by a lawyer, Henri Merlin, a former resistance comrade, with a job: a wealthy international financier, Maganhard, needs to be driven from Brittany to Liechtenstein in secrecy and within three days. The fact that the French Sûreté have an open arrest warrant out on Maganhard seems like a simple problem. However, when half the hit-men in Europe start gunning for them, things get complicated quickly. As Cane races the clock, the police, and the assassins across France and Switzerland, whom can he trust? Maganhard's alcoholic and troubled bodyguard? Maganhard's mysterious private secretary who seemingly goes out of her way to create problems? Or his former Resistance contacts, who might or might not sell him out for the highest price?

== Literary significance and criticism ==
Midnight Plus One won the British Crime Writers' Association's Silver Dagger Award for thrillers in 1965.

== Film, TV or theatrical adaptations ==
The film rights to Midnight Plus One were purchased by American actor Steve McQueen, who had planned to adapt it to the cinema before his untimely death. Columbia Pictures assigned the project to Bob Rafelson, but he and Bert Schneider ended up making the hit musical comedy "The Monkees".
