= The Wrong Side of the Sky =

1961 novel by Gavin Lyall

- First edition
- Author: Gavin Lyall
- Cover artist: Gavin Lyall
- Language: English
- Genre: Thriller novel
- Publisher: Hodder & Stoughton
- Publication date: 1961
- Publication place: United Kingdom
- Media type: Print
- Pages: 252
- OCLC: 59149331
- Followed by: The Most Dangerous Game

The Wrong Side of the Sky is the debut novel by English author Gavin Lyall, first published in 1961. It is written in the first person narrative.

== Plot introduction ==
Jack Clay, an ex-Royal Air Force military transport makes a threadbare living flying charter cargo flights of dubious legitimacy around the Mediterranean and other parts of Europe in an old Douglas DC-3. His dreams of having his own aeroplane and own charter company are rapidly fading due to age and lack of money, but at least he is flying. While in Athens, Greece he has a chance encounter with an old wartime friend and rival pilot, Ken Kitson, when the latter lands in a luxurious private Piaggio P.166.

Kitson is personal pilot to the immensely wealthy former-Nawab of Tungabhadra in Pakistan, who is searching the world for his family's heirloom jewels that had been stolen by a British charter pilot during the Partition of India. However, the Nawab is not the only one looking for the missing jewels, and is not the only one who would cheat, steal or murder to find them first.

== Literary significance & criticism ==
Although Lyall's debut novel, it was an immediate success; P.G. Wodehouse singled it out for special praise:“Terrific: when better novels of suspense are written, lead me to them.”
