= The Crocus List =

1985 novel by Gavin Lyall

Crocus List
- First edition
- Author: Gavin Lyall
- Language: English
- Series: Harry Maxim
- Genre: Thriller novel, Spy Novel
- Publisher: Hodder & Stoughton
- Publication date: 1985
- Publication place: United Kingdom
- Media type: Print (Hardback & Paperback)
- Pages: 288
- ISBN: 0-340-37260-5
- OCLC: 59149335
- Preceded by: The Conduct of Major Maxim
- Followed by: Uncle Target

Crocus List is a third person narrative novel by English author Gavin Lyall, first published in 1985, and the third of his series of novels with the character Harry Maxim as the protagonist.

== Plot introduction ==
Former SAS Major Harry Maxim, reassigned from Number 10 Downing Street back to the Ministry of Defence after the demotion of his boss George Harbinger from the post of private secretary to the prime minister, is part of a security detail at Westminster Abbey for a state funeral. The guest list includes the Queen of the United Kingdom and the President of the United States, as well as numerous other heads of state of various NATO member nations.

Political tensions with the Soviet Union are at an all-time high over Berlin, and Maxim is worried that the gathering would be an all-too-tempting target. He is right. Shots are fired, and a low-ranking British government minister sitting near the President is killed. The assassin kills himself with a grenade before he can be apprehended and is found to be carrying an old Soviet AK-47. All fingers point to the KGB. However, Maxim is far from convinced, and his investigation into the shooting takes him from London to Washington DC, (where he is reunited with MI-5 liaison officer Agnes Algar), and from there to New York City, the American Midwest and finally to East Berlin, as he unravels a conspiracy of massive proportions, which threatens to overthrow not only the British government, but all hopes for peace in Europe.

== The ongoing romance ==
Algar is relaxed and confident when she trades sex for secret information ("gave her little all for her Service" is Agnes's humorously self-mocking phrase), but her first time with Maxim is a disappointment.
