= Shooting Script =

1966 novel by Gavin Lyall

- First edition
- Author: Gavin Lyall
- Language: English
- Genre: Thriller novel
- Publisher: Hodder & Stoughton
- Publication date: 1966
- Publication place: United Kingdom
- Media type: Print
- Pages: 254pp
- OCLC: 17764534
- Preceded by: Midnight Plus One
- Followed by: Venus With Pistol

Shooting Script is a first person narrative novel by English author Gavin Lyall, first published in 1966. The book was selected as number 99 in the Top 100 Crime Novels of All Time, a list published by the Crime Writers' Association in 1990.

== Plot introduction ==
Keith Carr, an ex-Royal Air Force fighter pilot with combat experience in the Korean War, is now living in Jamaica, where he makes a threadbare living flying charter cargo flights around the Caribbean in his mortgaged second-hand de Havilland Dove. After he discovers that a pilot he knows from his Korean War days now commands a squadron of de Havilland Vampire jet fighters for the hard-line military dictators on the Central-American nation of “Republica Libra”, Carr suddenly finds life more difficult. And for some reason he can't understand, the United States FBI is keeping him under surveillance. Republica Libra at first offers him a job, and then impounds his plane when he refuses.

Carr is hired by the flamboyant movie director Walt Whitmore, who is filming an action movie on the north coast of Jamaica to fly an old World War II vintage B-25 Mitchell medium bomber as a camera plane. However, after the student pilot he's training ends up murdered, it becomes apparent that Whitmore has more in mind for Carr and the elderly bomber than just making a film.

== Trivia ==
(The character of Whitmore was inspired by John Wayne, with whom Lyall spent four days at a studio while Wayne was filming.)
