= Stanley Adams (whistleblower) =

Swiss whistleblower (c. 1927 – 2016)

Stanley George Adams (c. 1927 – 2016) was a former pharmaceutical company executive and corporate whistleblower, whose case was a cause célèbre in the 1970s.

== Biography ==
Born in Malta as Stanislao Formosa, he changed his name to Stanley George Adams by deed poll on 12 May 1950. Adams was a senior executive with the Swiss pharmaceutical company Hoffmann-LaRoche when in 1973 he discovered documents which indicated that the company was involved in price-fixing to artificially inflate the price of vitamins. He passed on the documents to the competition commission of the European Economic Community, aware that Switzerland, while not part of the EEC, had a free trade agreement with it.

The EEC failed to keep his name confidential during its investigation, passing documents containing Adams' name to Hoffman La Roche. Adams was arrested and charged with industrial espionage and theft. Adams' wife was told that he faced a 20-year jail term for industrial espionage. She committed suicide. In the end, Adams served six months in a Swiss prison. When released, he fled to the United Kingdom and, with the assistance of a number of Labour Party MPs, notably John Prescott, later deputy party leader, he attempted to recover compensation from both the Swiss government and the EEC. In 1985 the EEC agreed to pay Adams £200,000, about 40% of his total costs. He documented the saga in Roche vs Adams.

In 1985, he was elected rector of St Andrews University (a student-elected post). In 1994, Adams was convicted of soliciting Tony Cox, a former member of a secret British Army unit in Northern Ireland, to murder his second wife, so that he could claim £500,000 in life insurance. Commenting on his actions after being released from prison, Adams expressed regret that his efforts to have his wife killed had ruined his chances of a seat in the House of Lords. He served five years of a ten-year prison sentence.

In 1985 Director/Producer John Goldschmidt made the TV-Movie A Song for Europe (also known as A Crime of Honour), which was inspired by Adams' story. The film was shown on Channel 4 in the UK, on ZDF in Germany, on SRG in Switzerland and on ORF in Austria. The British actor David Suchet and Goldschmidt won Royal Television Society Awards for the film.

Academic offices
Preceded by Katharine Whitehorn	Rector of the University of St Andrews; 1985–1988	Succeeded by Nicholas Parsons
