= The Conduct of Major Maxim =

1982 novel by Gavin Lyall

- First edition
- Author: Gavin Lyall
- Language: English
- Series: Harry Maxim
- Genre: Thriller novel, Spy Novel
- Publisher: Hodder & Stoughton
- Publication date: 1982
- Publication place: United Kingdom
- Media type: Print (hardcover and paperback)
- Pages: 255 pp
- ISBN: 0-340-58865-9
- OCLC: 60079825
- Preceded by: The Secret Servant
- Followed by: The Crocus List

The Conduct of Major Maxim is an espionage thriller novel by English author Gavin Lyall, first published in 1982, and the second of his series of four novels with the character “Harry Maxim” as the protagonist. The character was originally developed for a projected BBC television series..

== Plot introduction ==
Former SAS Major Harry Maxim is assigned to Number 10 Downing Street, where he works under George Harbinger, private secretary to the Prime Minister. Maxim is asked by now-retired Sergeant Caswell (who appeared with Maxim in the first scene of The Secret Servant) to assist Corporal Ron Blagg, who has gone AWOL from the British Army after assisting MI6 in a botched undercover operation.

Maxim soon discovers that both MI6 and a shadowy Soviet service are searching for Blagg, with deadly consequences. Maxim's efforts to help Blagg are hindered by a web of deceit and suspicion among various British government offices and agencies. The situation escalates when he uncovers a secret so dangerous to one of the new leaders of the German Democratic Republic that they will kill to protect it. The story's settings, including housing projects in South London, a small rural town in Germany, and a declining port town in Humberside, are vividly depicted.

== The growing romance ==
MI5 liaison Agnes Algar warms to Harry in this book, and provides invaluable professional assistance as an experienced MI-5 agent, but still tries to keep her distance from his domestic life.
