= Gavin Lyall =

English author (1932–2003)

- Born: Gavin Tudor Lyall; 9 May 1932; Birmingham, Warwickshire, England
- Died: 18 January 2003 (aged 70); London
- Occupations: journalist and novelist
- Spouse: Katharine Whitehorn (m. 1958)
- Writing career
- Genre: Thriller

Gavin Tudor Lyall (9 May 1932 – 18 January 2003) was an English author of espionage thrillers.

== Biography ==
Lyall was born in Birmingham, then in Warwickshire (now West Midlands), England, as the son of a local accountant, and educated at King Edward's School, Birmingham. After completing his two years of National Service, 1951 to 1953, as a Pilot Officer in the Royal Air Force flying Gloster Meteors, he went to Pembroke College, Cambridge, graduating in 1956 with honours in English.

While at Cambridge he wrote regularly for the undergraduate newspaper Varsity and also created a strip cartoon whose hero, "Olly", reflected student life and became a cult figure. He became editor of Varsity in 1956.

After graduating he worked briefly as a reporter for the Birmingham Gazette, Picture Post and Sunday Graphic newspapers and then as a film director for the BBC's Tonight programme. In 1958, he married the author Katharine Whitehorn, with whom he was to have two sons.

Lyall lived at 14 Provost Rd, London NW3 and enjoyed sailing on the Thames in his motor cruiser. From 1959 to 1962 he was a newspaper reporter and the aviation correspondent for the Sunday Times. His first novel, The Wrong Side of the Sky, was published in 1961, drawing from his personal experiences in the Libyan Desert and in Greece. It was an immediate success; P.G. Wodehouse said of it, "Terrific: when better novels of suspense are written, lead me to them." Lyall then left journalism in 1963 to become a full-time author.

Lyall's first seven novels in the 1960s and early 1970s were action thrillers with different settings around the world. The Most Dangerous Game (1963) was set in Finnish Lapland. The film rights to Midnight Plus One (1965), in which an ex-spy is hired to drive a millionaire to Liechtenstein were purchased by actor Steve McQueen, who had planned to adapt it to the cinema before he died. Shooting Script (1966), about a former RAF pilot hired to fly his de Havilland Dove for a filming company, later in the story a B-25 Mitchell, is set around the Caribbean. Whitmore, a central character in the story was inspired by John Wayne whom Lyall had met while reporting on the making of the 1957 film Legend of the Lost in Libya. The protagonists of Judas Country (1975) are again former RAF pilots, and the setting is now in Cyprus and the Middle East.

Lyall is credited as co-writer (together with Frank Hardman and Martin Davison) of the original story on which the screenplay of the 1969 science-fiction film Moon Zero Two is based.

Gavin Lyall was also a wargamer and appeared in "Battleground", a Tyne Tees television series on miniature war gaming in 1978.

Lyall won the British Crime Writers' Association's Silver Dagger award in both 1964 and 1965. In 1966-67 he was Chairman of the British Crime Writers Association. He was not a prolific author, attributing his slow pace to obsession with technical accuracy. According to a British newspaper, "he spent many nights in his kitchen at Primrose Hill, north London, experimenting to see if one could, in fact, cast bullets from lead melted in a saucepan, or whether the muzzle flash of a revolver fired across a saucer of petrol really would ignite a fire". He eventually published the results of his research in a series of pamphlets for the Crime Writers' Association in the 1970s. Lyall signed a contract in 1964 by the investments group Booker similar to one they had signed with Ian Fleming. In return for a lump payment of £25,000 and an annual salary, they and Lyall subsequently split his royalties, 51–49.

Up to the publication in 1975 of Judas Country, Lyall's work falls into two groups. The aviation thrillers (The Wrong Side of the Sky, The Most Dangerous Game, Shooting Script, and Judas Country), and what might be called "Euro-thrillers" revolving around international crime in Europe (Midnight Plus One, Venus With Pistol, and Blame The Dead). All these books were written in the first person, with a sardonic style reminiscent of the "hard-boiled private-eye" genre. Despite the commercial success of his work, Lyall began to feel that he was falling into a predictable pattern, and abandoned both his earlier genres, and the first-person narrative, for his "Harry Maxim" series of espionage thrillers beginning with The Secret Servant published in 1980. This book, originally developed for a proposed BBC TV Series, featured Major Harry Maxim, an SAS officer assigned as a security adviser to 10 Downing Street, and was followed by three sequels with the same central cast of characters. In the 1990s Lyall changed literary direction once again, and wrote four semi-historical thrillers about the fledgling British secret service in the years leading up to World War I.

Lyall died of cancer in 2003.

== Works ==
- The Wrong Side of the Sky (1961)
- The Most Dangerous Game (1963)
- Midnight Plus One (1965)
- Shooting Script (1966)
- Venus With Pistol (1969)
- Freedom's Battle: The War in the Air 1939-1945 (1971)
- Blame the Dead (1973)
- Judas Country (1975)
- Operation Warboard: How to Fight World War II Battles in Miniature (1976) non-fiction, in collaboration with his son Bernard Lyall
- The Secret Servant (1980)
- The Conduct of Major Maxim (1982)
- The Crocus List (1985)
- Uncle Target (1988)
- Spy's Honour (1993)
- Flight from Honour (1996)
- All Honourable Men (1997)
- Honourable Intentions (1999)

== Obituaries ==
- The Guardian
- The Times
- Lewis, Paul (22 January 2003). "Gavin Lyall, 70, Popular Author Of Spy and Suspense Novels, Dies". The New York Times.
