= Katharine Whitehorn =

British journalist, columnist, author, and radio presenter (1928–2021)

Katharine Whitehorn CBE
- Born: Katharine Elizabeth Whitehorn; 2 March 1928; Hendon, Middlesex, England
- Died: 8 January 2021 (aged 92); London, England
- Education: Roedean School; Glasgow High School for Girls; Newnham College, Cambridge
- Occupations: Columnist; author
- Years active: 1956–2017
- Known for: First female rector of a Scottish university
- Spouse: Gavin Lyall (m. 1958; died 2003)
- Children: 2

Katharine Elizabeth Whitehorn CBE (2 March 1928 – 8 January 2021) was a British journalist, columnist, author and radio presenter. She was the first woman to have a column in The Observer, which ran from 1963 to 1996 and from 2011 to 2017. She was the first female rector of a university in Scotland. Her books include Cooking in a Bedsitter (1961).

== Early life ==
Whitehorn was born in Hendon on 2 March 1928. Her family was on the left of the political spectrum and nonconformist, with her father being a conscientious objector and her mother having secured a place to study at the University of Cambridge. Her maternal great-grandfather was the final person to be charged with heresy by the Church of Scotland; he was ultimately acquitted. Whitehorn was educated at the private Roedean School near Brighton, and Glasgow High School for Girls. She went on to read English at Newnham College, Cambridge. After graduation, she worked as a freelancer in London, before moving to Finland to teach English and undertaking postgraduate studies at Cornell University.

== Career ==
=== Journalism, writing and broadcasting ===
Whitehorn started her career in journalism covering fashion, and was a sub-editor for the Woman's Own women's magazine in 1956, when the Picture Post photographer Bert Hardy asked her to model for him. He photographed her for a story on loneliness in London, and one photograph of her sitting by a fire with a cigarette, as if thinking to write an article instead of being lonely, became an advertisement for the energy drink Lucozade. On Hardy's recommendation, she got a job writing for the Picture Post, where her future husband, Gavin Lyall, also worked. After it closed in 1957, she briefly worked for various publications, including The Spectator, before joining The Observer in 1960, initially as fashion editor, although her article about "Widow's Might" was a valuable contribution to the emerging help for widows. She was promoted to an Observer columnist in 1963, becoming the first woman to write a column in that newspaper. Her column proved popular with readers, and she continued to write it until 1996, working partly from home, which was unusual at the time. From 1997 to 2016, she wrote a monthly agony aunt column for Saga Magazine. Whitehorn's column was reinstated in The Observer magazine by John Mulholland in 2011 and continued to appear until 2017.

Her initial book, Cooking in a Bedsitter (originally Kitchen in the Corner: A Complete Guide to Bedsitter Cookery) – first published in 1961 and a classic of its kind – remained in print for thirty-five years and was republished in 2008. She later published a series of books, How to Survive..., including Social Survival (1968). In 2007 she published her autobiography, Selective Memory.

Her writing is characterised by the Observer columnist Barbara Ellen as "defiantly human, female liberal, sane, amused, authentic and often revolutionary in its candid audacity." Ellen considers Whitehorn a "feminist voice", and describes her as skilled at "evoking the pathos and humour of chaotic female life". Her 1963 article on sluts, in the sense of 'slovenly women', in which Whitehorn identified herself with the term, created a minor sensation:

Have you ever taken anything out of the dirty-clothes basket because it had become, relatively, the cleaner thing? Changed stockings in a taxi? Could you try on clothes in any shop, any time, without worrying about your underclothes? How many things are in the wrong room-cups in the study, boots in the kitchen?

In 2009, Whitehorn began presenting some editions of the short philosophical Friday evening programme on Radio 4 entitled A Point of View. She was interviewed by National Life Stories (C467/19) in 2009 for the 'Oral History of the British Press' collection held by the British Library.

=== Administrative roles ===
In addition to her career in journalism, Whitehorn was involved in several committees. In 1965–1967, she sat on a committee chaired by the judge John Latey, which reviewed reducing the UK's age of majority from 21 to 18, and contributed to making its report easy to read. The committee's recommendation was accepted in the Family Law Reform Act of 1969. She was also a member of an advisory panel to the BBC, which reviewed television's effects on society (1971–1972).

From 1982 to 1985, Whitehorn served as the Rector of the University of St Andrews: the first woman rector of a Scottish university. In recognition of her pioneering role, Whitehorn Hall, St Andrews, was named after her. She also served as vice-president of the Patients Association (1983–1996), a charity advocating for patients' rights, and advised the Institute for Global Ethics (1993–2011).

== Personal life and honours ==
Whitehorn married spy fiction novelist Gavin Lyall in 1958. They had two sons. She found it difficult to cope with her husband's death in 2003, writing: "You don't 'get over' the man, though you do after a year or two get over the death. But you have to learn to live in another country in which you're an unwilling refugee."

In 2004, the National Portrait Gallery, London acquired three portraits of Whitehorn by the photographer J.S. Lewinski. Whitehorn was appointed Commander of the Order of the British Empire (CBE) in the 2014 New Year Honours for services to journalism. This came about 50 years after she initially declined an honour.

It was reported in 2018 that she was living in a care home with Alzheimer's disease. Her home in Hampstead was sold, and her sons auctioned her writing-desk, with the proceeds going to Dementia UK. Whitehorn died on 8 January 2021, at a care home in north London. She was 92, and had been diagnosed with COVID-19 during the COVID-19 pandemic in England in the time leading up to her death.

== Selected bibliography ==
- Cooking in a Bedsitter (originally entitled Kitchen in the Corner: A Complete Guide to Bedsitter Cookery; 1961)
- Roundabout (articles reprinted from The Spectator) [London : Methuen & Co., 1962] ASIN B0000CLI50
- Only on Sundays [London : Methuen, 1966] OCLC 2423116
- Observations [London : Methuen, 1970] ISBN 9780416082104
- Sunday Best [London : Eyre Methuen, 1976] ISBN 9780413368102
- View from a Column [London : Eyre Methuen, 1981] ISBN 9780413486202
- Selective Memory by Katharine Whitehorn, 2007, published by Little Brown ISBN 9780748127559

Academic offices
| Preceded by Tim Brooke-Taylor | Rector of the University of St Andrews; 1982-1985 | Succeeded by Stanley Adams |
