= Uncle Target =

1988 novel by Gavin Lyall

- First edition
- Author: Gavin Lyall
- Language: English
- Series: Harry Maxim
- Genre: Military Thriller Novel
- Publisher: Hodder & Stoughton
- Publication date: 1988
- Publication place: United Kingdom
- Media type: Print (Hardback & Paperback)
- Pages: 288
- ISBN: 0-340-41701-3
- OCLC: 18520939
- Preceded by: The Crocus List
- Followed by: Spy's Honour

Uncle Target is a third person narrative novel by English author Gavin Lyall, first published in 1988, and the fourth and last in his series of novels with the character “Harry Maxim” as the protagonist. The title is explained as a piece of army slang - Uncle Target meaning the person everyone is shooting at. This comes from WW2 Royal Artillery procedures, where "Uncle target" was a concentration of all a division's artillery.

== Plot introduction ==
The Palestinian-dominated Royal Jordanian Army's 17th Armoured Brigade has revolted with Syrian assistance, and has seized the southern part of Jordan, including the port city of Aqaba. However, the major concern for the British Army is that a prototype main battle tank on trials in the Jordanian desert has gone missing. After a terrorist attack in London fails, British military intelligence discovers that the tank is hidden in the ruins of an ancient Crusader fort near Wadi Rum. SAS-trained Major Harry Maxim, who formerly trained the Jordanian Army, is the ideal candidate to send in a commando raid to destroy the tank before it can fall into rebel (and thus Soviet) hands. However, the mission is botched when Maxim's helicopter crashes, and Maxim, an infantryman with no Armoured experience, decides that the best chance for the survival of his small team is to attempt to drive the tank across a hundred miles of rebel held desert to the presumed safety of Saudi Arabia.

== The continuing romance ==
Agnes Algar finds the emotional pressures of being Maxim's "significant other" more draining than the pressures of her work at MI5.

== Review ==
The tank itself, and the culture of the soldiers who operate it, are the focus of this book, which has been compared to Tom Clancy's The Hunt for Red October in terms of the amount of detailed information conveyed to the reader.
