= British Westpoint Airlines =

British Westpoint Airlines was a British charter and scheduled airline from 1962 to 1967.

== History ==
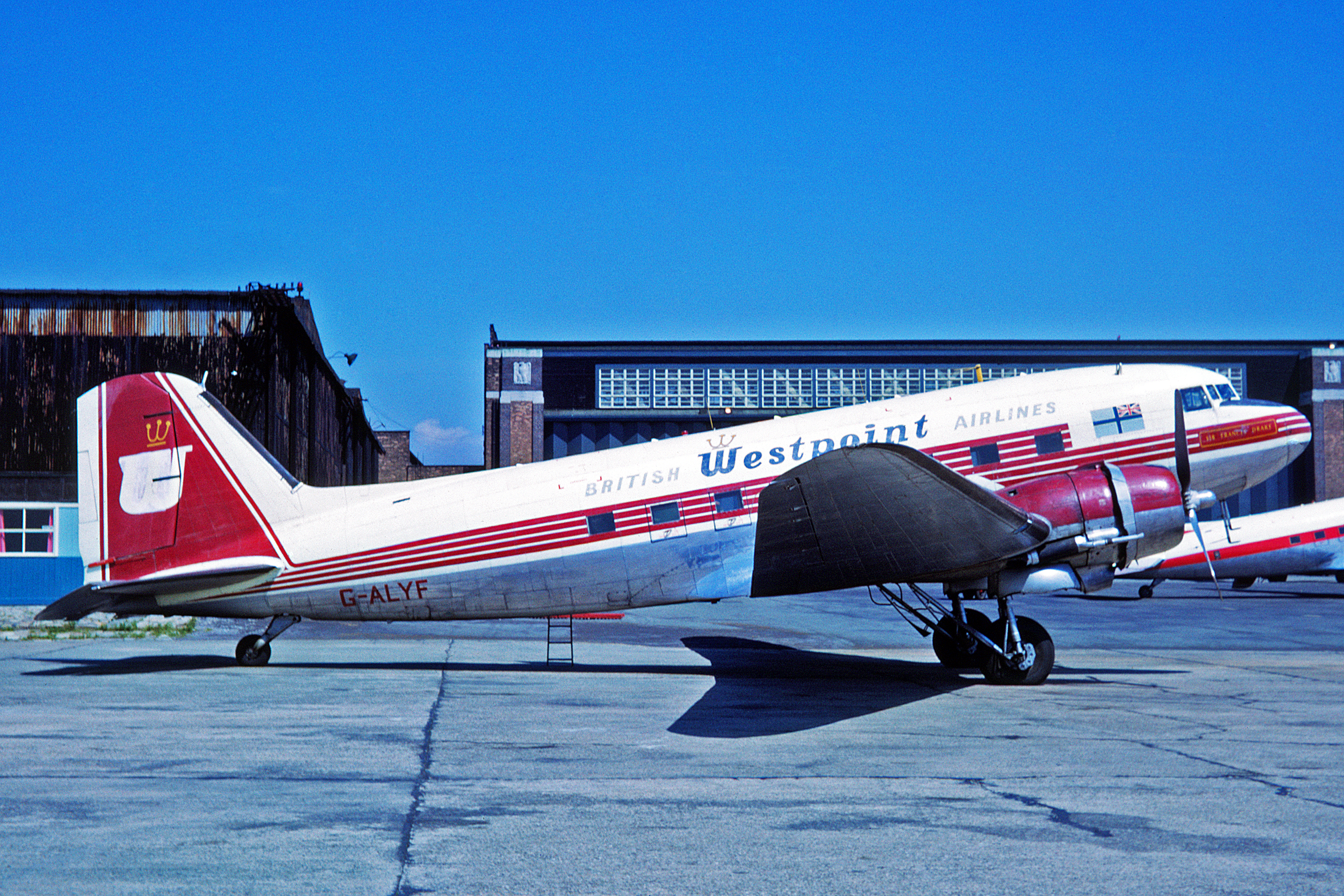
Douglas DC-3

The airline was established on December 2, 1960, as F & J Mann Airways. based at Exeter, created by brothers Frank and Jack Mann of Torquay whose ambition was to establish viable air services in the West Country. By the time of the first commercial operation, a charter flown by Douglas DC-3 between Bournemouth and Ostend on 30 March 1961, the company had adopted the name of Westpoint Aviation Ltd.. Although a scheduled licence was obtained for Exeter-Newcastle route in 1961 the company directed its efforts towards the inclusive tour market. Early activity comprised frequent flights to the Continent, especially day-trips carrying visitors to the Dutch bulbfields. Soon the air carrier moved further afield with flights to the cities of Barcelona and Gibraltar. Westpoint soon built up a reputation for reliability together with services for other carriers.

A second DC 3 entered service in September 1961 in time to round off a busy season, mainly with IT flights from Gatwick. The third aircraft was obtained in March 1962. British Westpoint Airlines Ltd., as it had become in late 1962, kept going with a series of skiing charters from both Gatwick and Luton airports to Alps resorts. With three DC 3s at hand, on April 1, 1963, a scheduled service between Newquay and London-Heathrow via Exeter was launched. During the year, Westpoint undertook over 2,000 passenger and freight flights, while scheduled services uplifted some 8,800 passengers at an average 40% load factor.

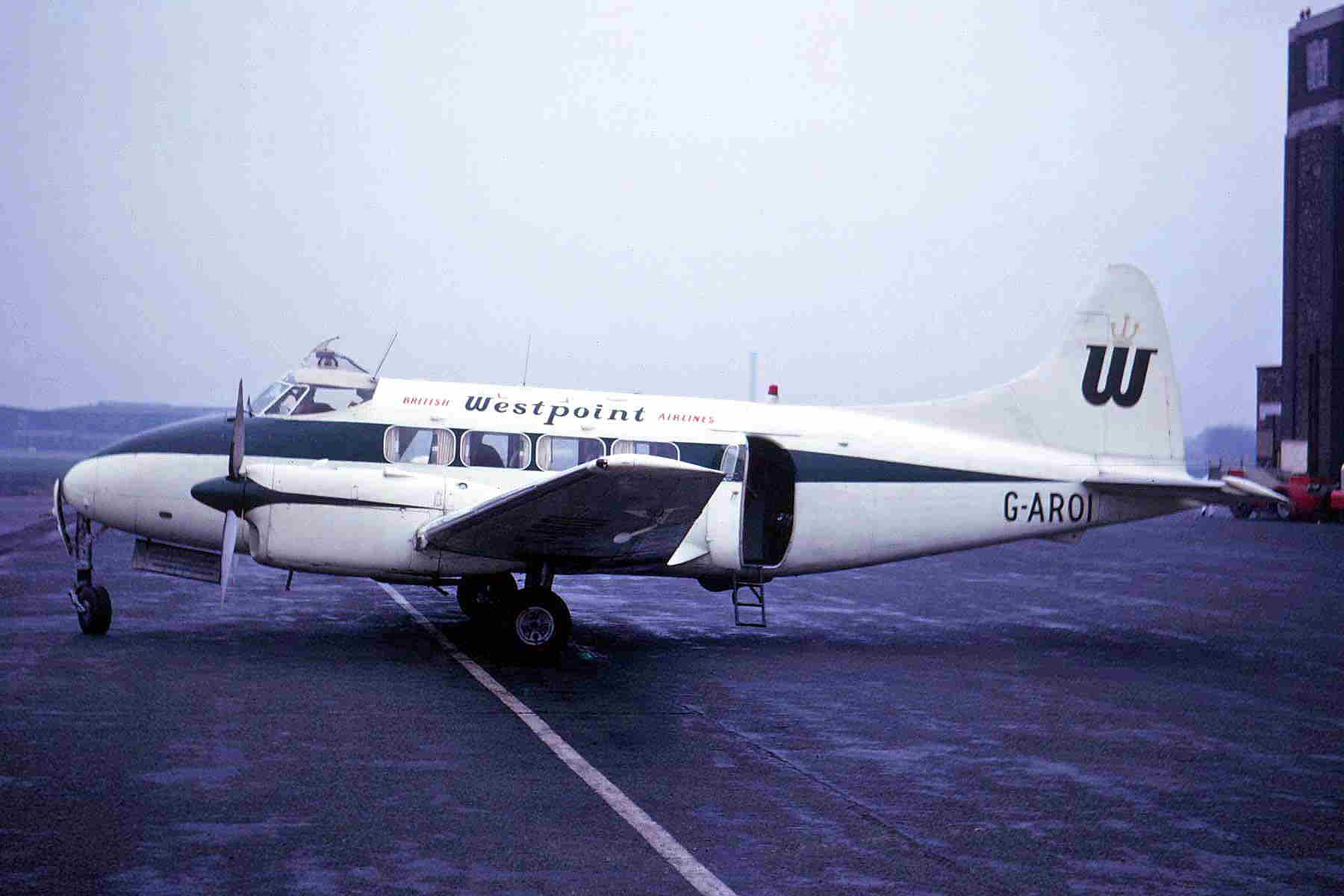
DH.104 de Havilland Dove

After 1963, the company focused less on holiday tours and concentrated on local services and occasional subcontracting work. Following an earlier unsuccessful attempt, Mayflower Air Services was taken over in May 1964 and with it, two de Havilland Dragon Rapides together with routes linking the Isles of Scilly with Bristol, Cardiff, Exeter, Newquay and Plymouth; it became possible to fly from Heathrow to St. Mary's. When, in May 1964, British European Airways relinquished its DH.89 Rapides for S-61N helicopters on the Scilly Isles run British Westpoint picked up the three redundant examples. The drying-up of IT business saw a switch to numerous ad-hoc charters. Things began looking better in the spring of 1965, with the addition of a DH.114 de Havilland Heron. Further de Havilland airliners arrived in the shape of two DH.104 de Havilland Doves under a co-operative arrangement with Metropolitan Air Movements. On April 10, 1965, one of these aircraft opened a weekly Exeter-Gatwick scheduled service, while another began flying from early June another schedule between Heathrow, Gatwick and Sandown (IoW).

After a season of close co-operation, British Westpoint was officially taken over by Metropolitan Air Movements on September 13, 1965, although Frank Mann retained ownership of several of the original aircraft for the next couple of years. After this event the airline was in decline. A few ad-hoc charters were flown and a once-daily Exeter-Gatwick service was maintained, but with the return of DH.104 on April 29, 1966, all flying came to an end.

== Fleet ==
- 3 x de Havilland Dove
- 5 x de Havilland Dragon Rapide
- 1 x de Havilland Heron
- 5 x Douglas DC-3 2 leased

== See also ==
- List of defunct airlines of the United Kingdom
