= The Secret Servant (Lyall novel) =

1980 novel by Gavin Lyall

- First edition
- Author: Gavin Lyall
- Language: English
- Series: Harry Maxim
- Genre: Thriller novel, Spy Novel
- Publisher: Hodder & Stoughton
- Publication date: 1980
- Publication place: United Kingdom
- Media type: Print (hardcover and paperback)
- Pages: 224 pp
- ISBN: 0-340-25385-1
- OCLC: 59149335
- Followed by: The Conduct of Major Maxim

The Secret Servant is a third person narrative novel by English author Gavin Lyall, first published in 1980, and the first of his series of novels with the character “Harry Maxim” as the protagonist.

== Plot introduction ==
Former SAS Major Harry Maxim is assigned to Number 10 Downing Street as a special assistant to George Harbinger, private secretary to the Prime Minister, following the suicide of an official with the Ministry of Defence. Maxim is assigned to protect Professor John White Tyler, Britain's premier military strategist on nuclear weapons policy and famed war hero (as well as an insatiable lecher). Tyler's many enemies, including local pacifists, leftists, and radical students, as well as the KGB will do anything, perhaps even murder, to keep Tyler from addressing a NATO summit in Luxembourg. However, are various events surrounding Tyler related? Such as a hand grenade thrown through the door to the Prime Minister's residence, or the death of a Czech defector? Assisted by MI5 liaison officer Agnes Algar, Maxim must uncover a horrific secret from Tyler's wartime past in order to prevent a massive foreign relations disaster, as well as keeping Tyler alive.

== Film, TV or theatrical adaptations ==
Lyall originally wrote The Secret Servant as the pilot episode of a proposed BBC TV series. The series was directed by Alistair Reid, with screenplay by Brian Clemens. The role of Harry Maxim was played by Charles Dance, with Jill Meager as Agnes Algar, Harvey Ashby as George Harbinger and Dan O'Herlihy as Prof. John White Tyler.
