= HAL Aerospace Museum =

Aerospace museum in Bangalore, India

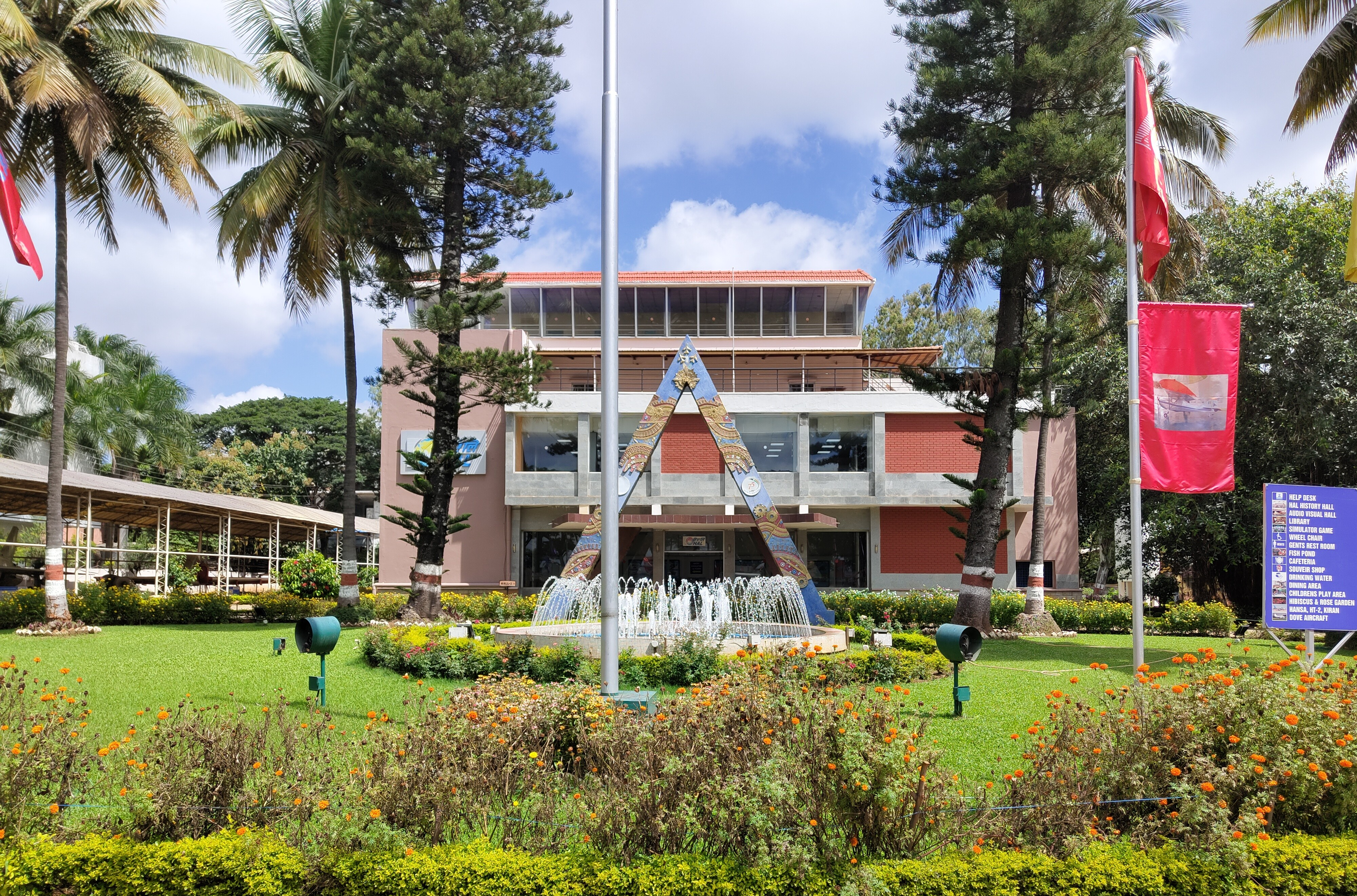

- Location in the Map of Bangalore
- Established: 30 August 2001
- Location: Airport-Varthur road, Bangalore
- Coordinates: 12.955431°N 77.681386°E
- Type: Aviation museum

HAL Aerospace Museum is India's first aerospace museum located at Hindustan Aeronautics Limited premises, in Bangalore. Established in 2001, the Museum is part of the HAL Heritage Centre and Aero Space Museum, and showcases the growth of the Indian aviation industry and HAL for six decades. The museum houses displays of various aircraft and helicopters, Aircraft engine models, Flight simulators, a mock Air Traffic Control Tower and exhibit of Indian aviation history. The Museum is maintained by HAL (one of Asia's largest Aerospace companies).

== Gallery ==
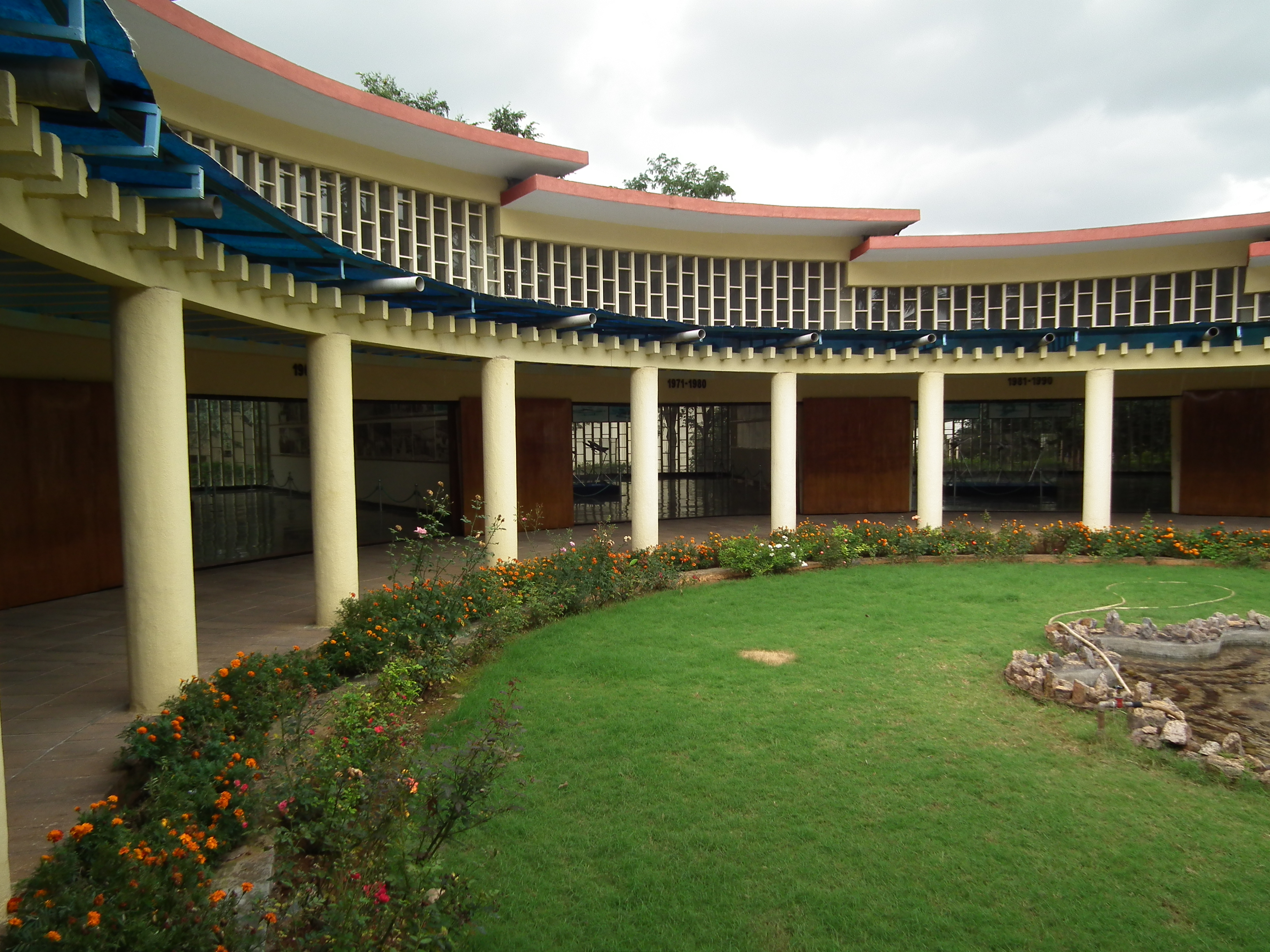
HAL heritage center.

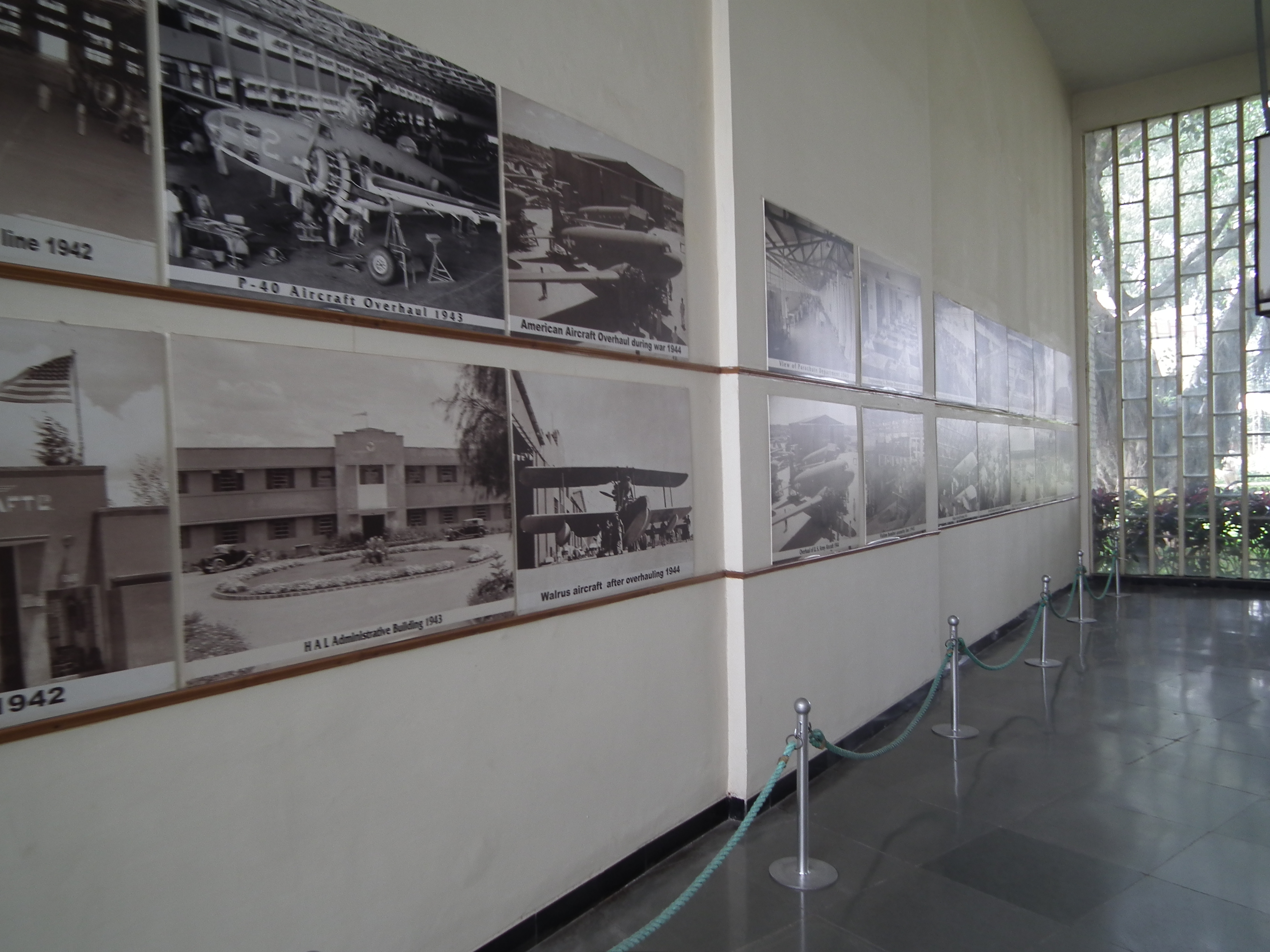
HAL Museum Wall of fame 1940, 1950, 1960.

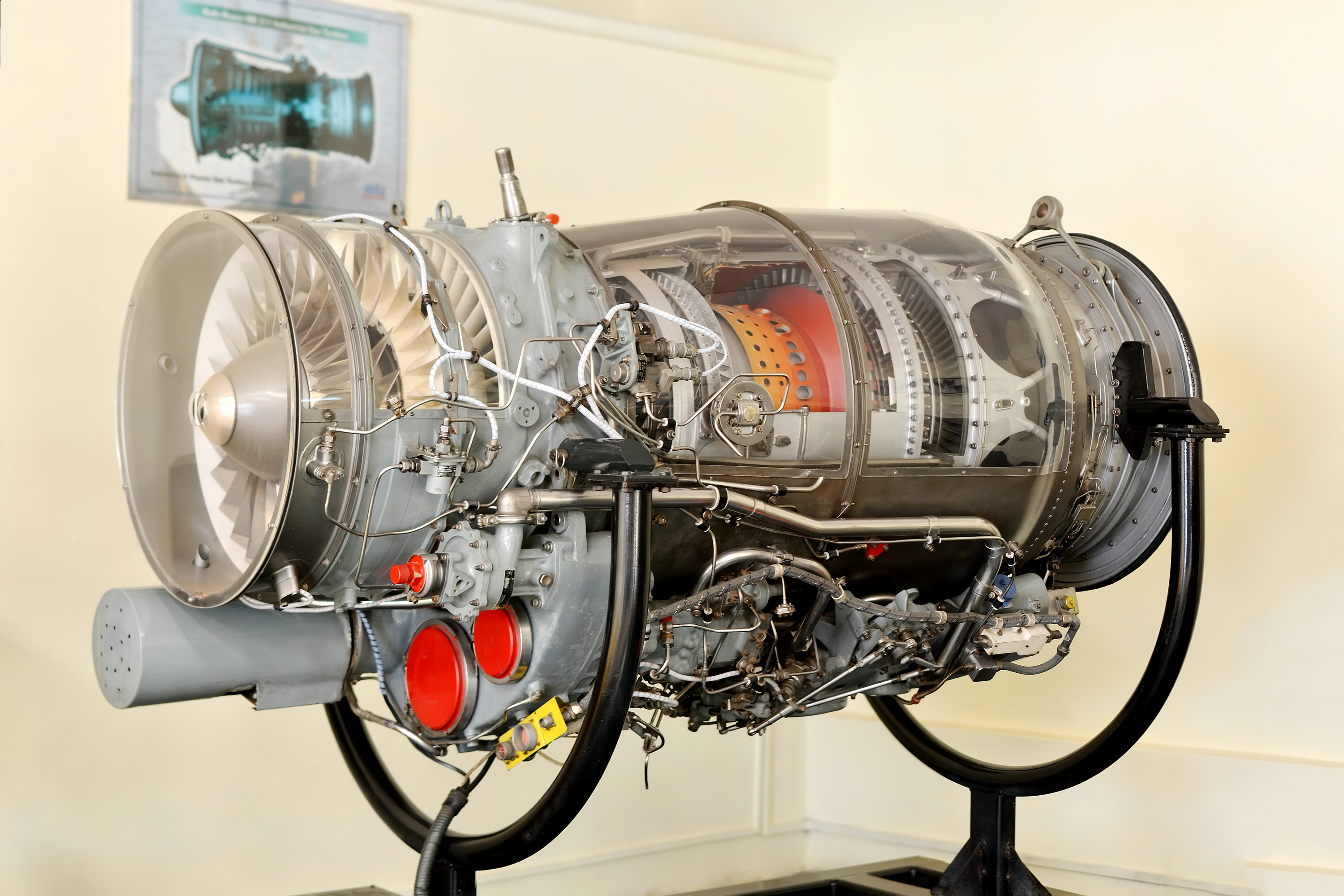
Adour Mk 811.

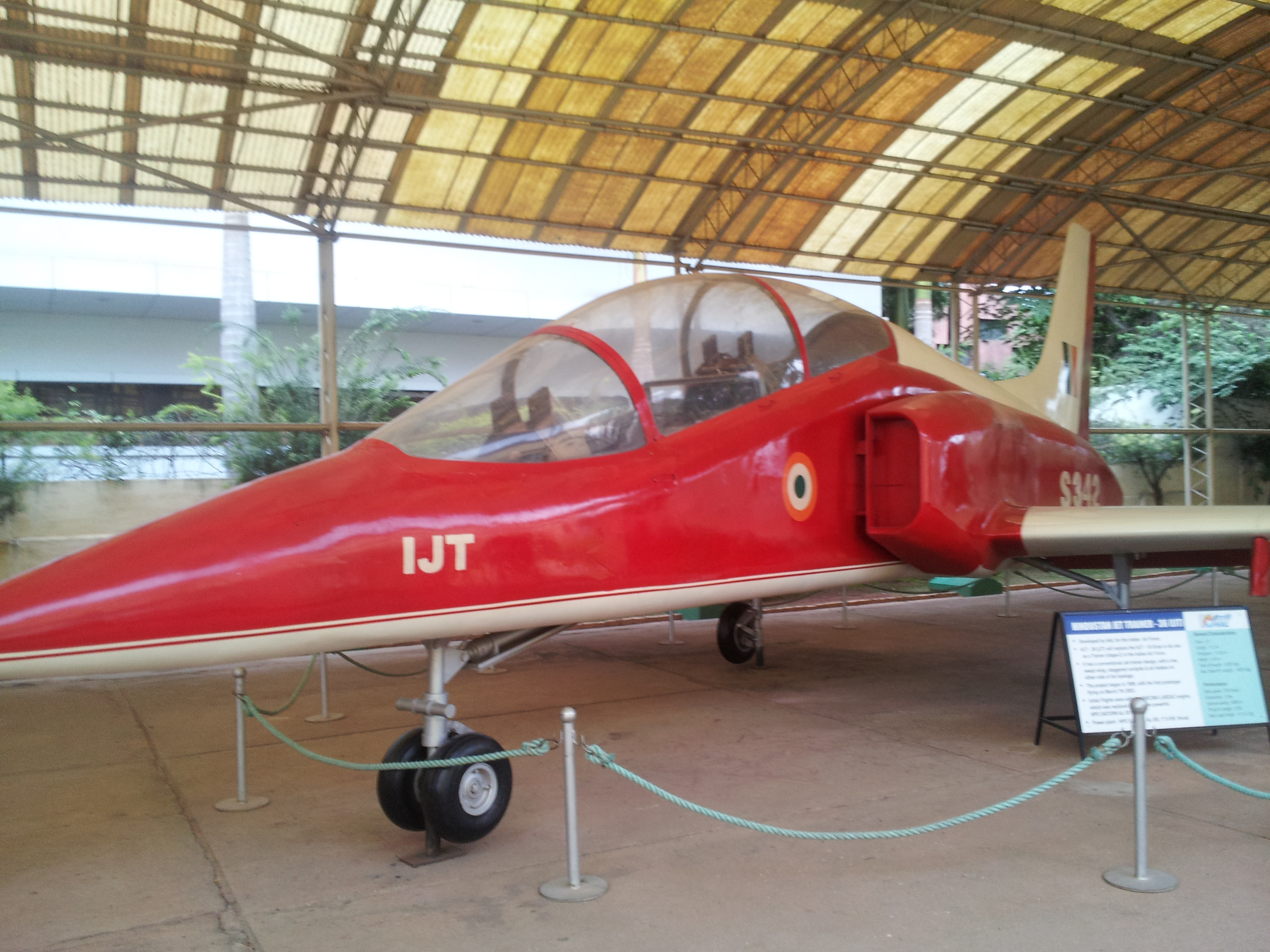
HAL HJT-36 Sitara (IJT), intermediate jet trainer prototype.

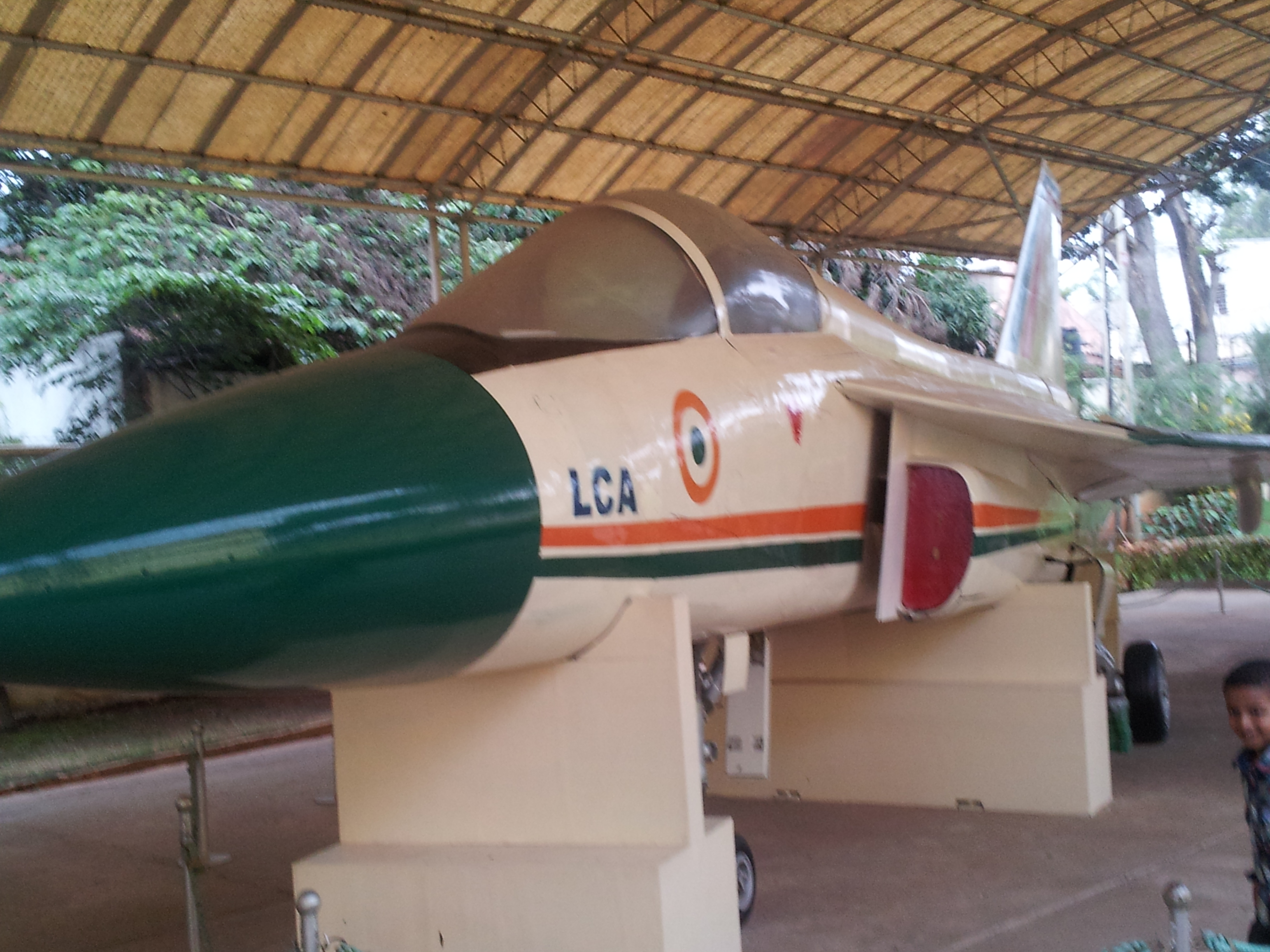
HAL Tejas mock-up (LCA) light weight multi-role fighter.

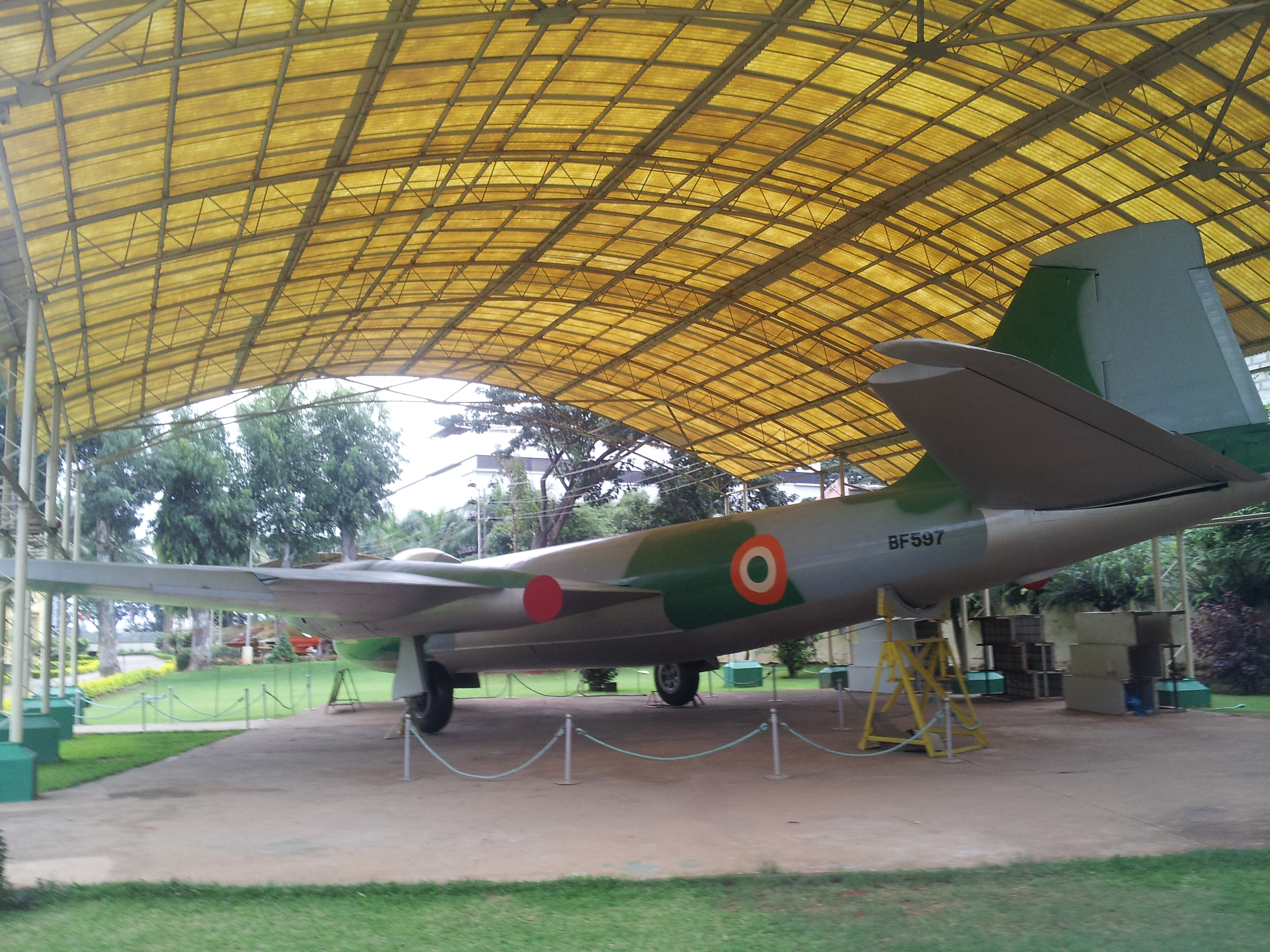
English Electric Canberra jet-powered bomber.

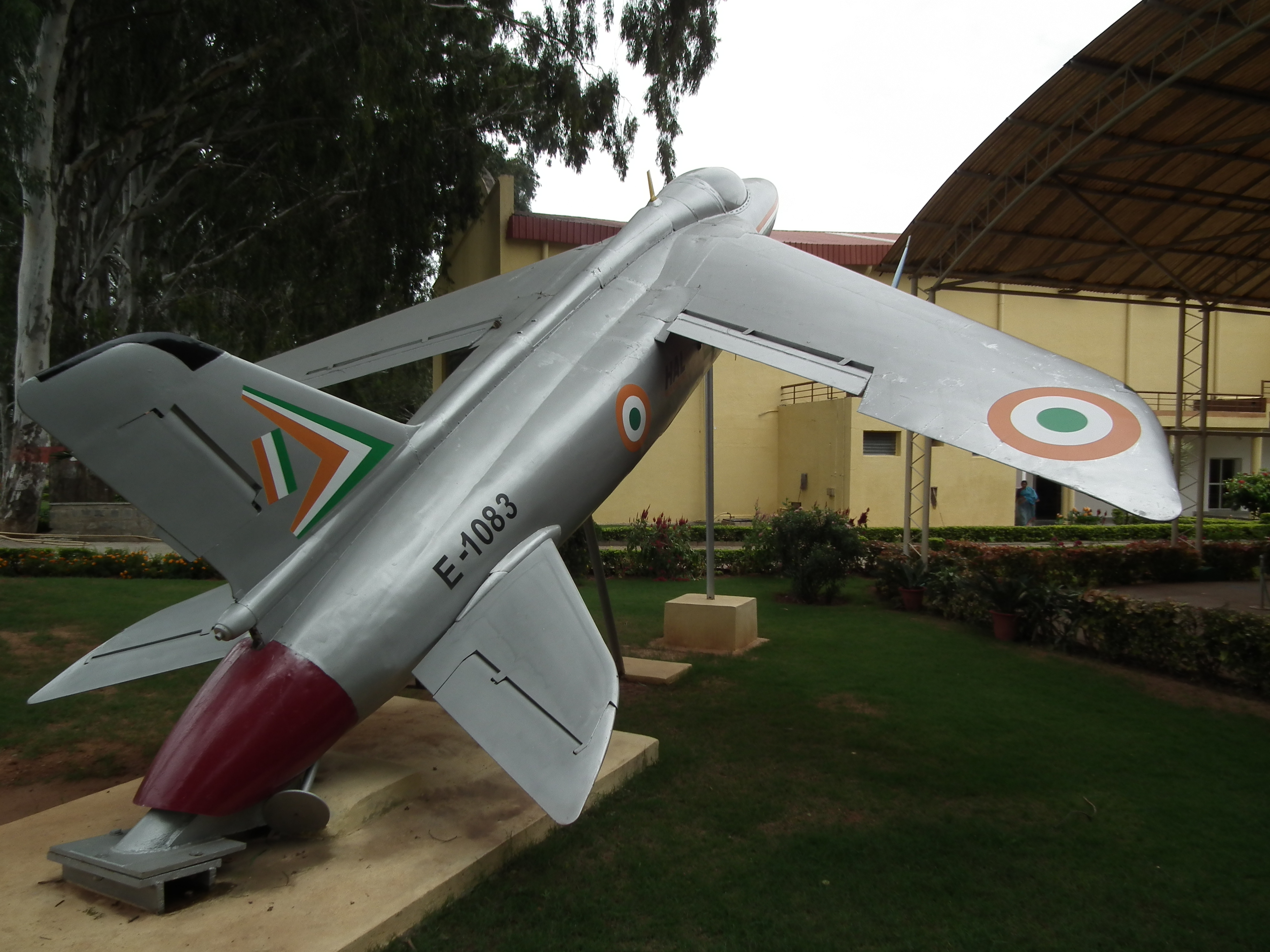
HAL Ajeet subsonic jet trainer & light fighter aircraft.

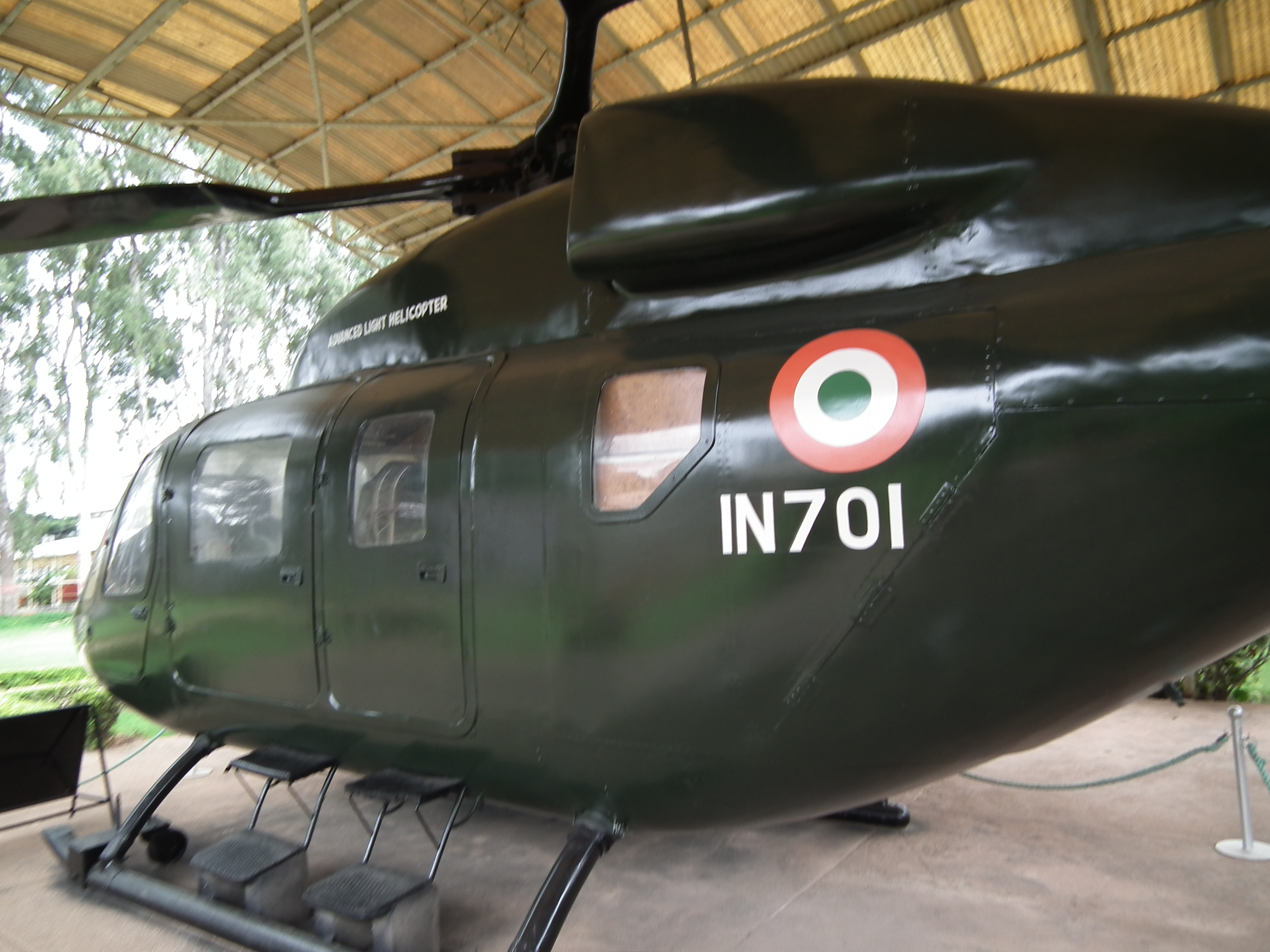
A prototype HAL Dhruv ALH (Advanced Light Helicopter)

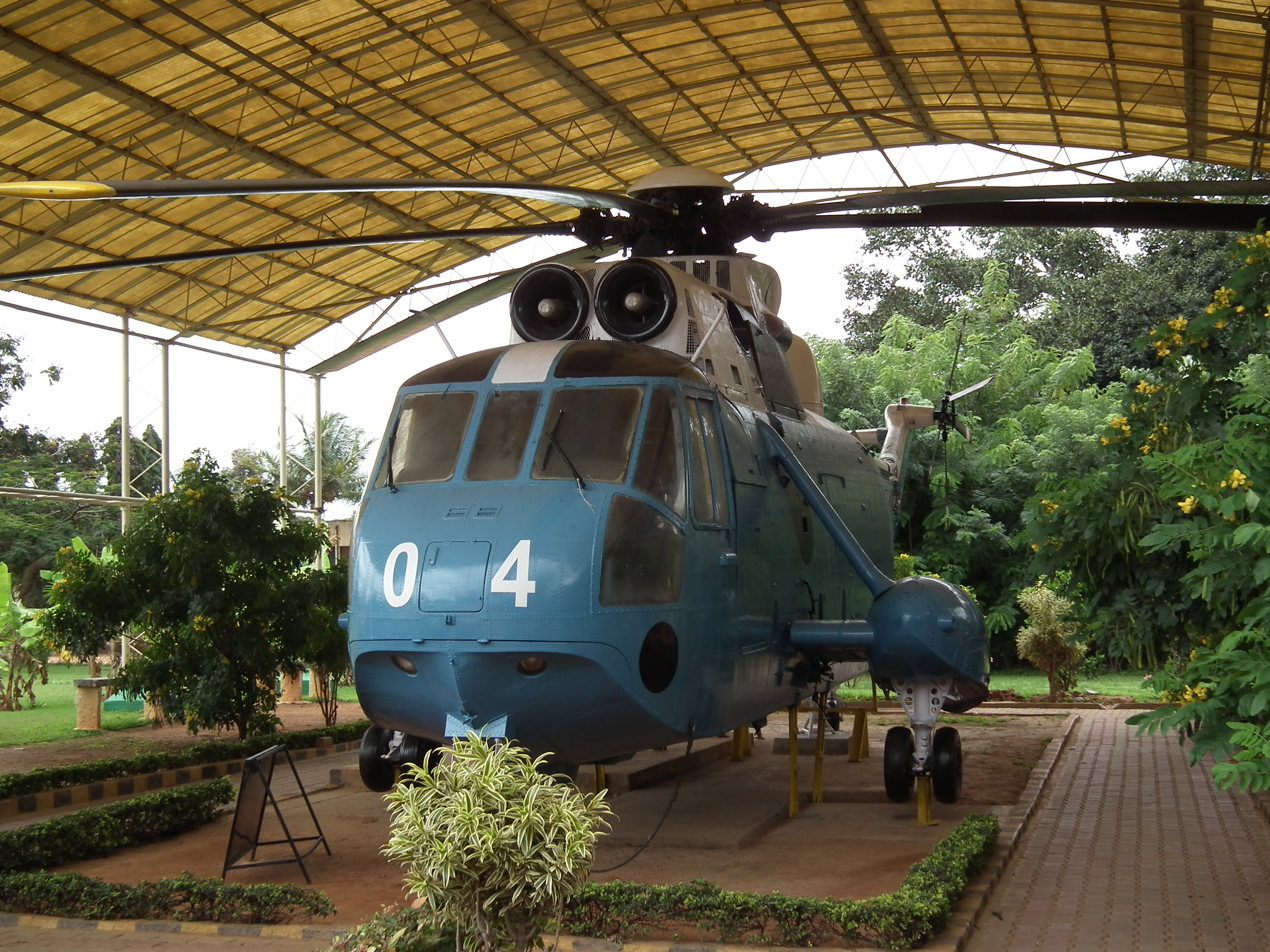
Westland Sea King Mk.42 medium-lift transport/utility helicopter.

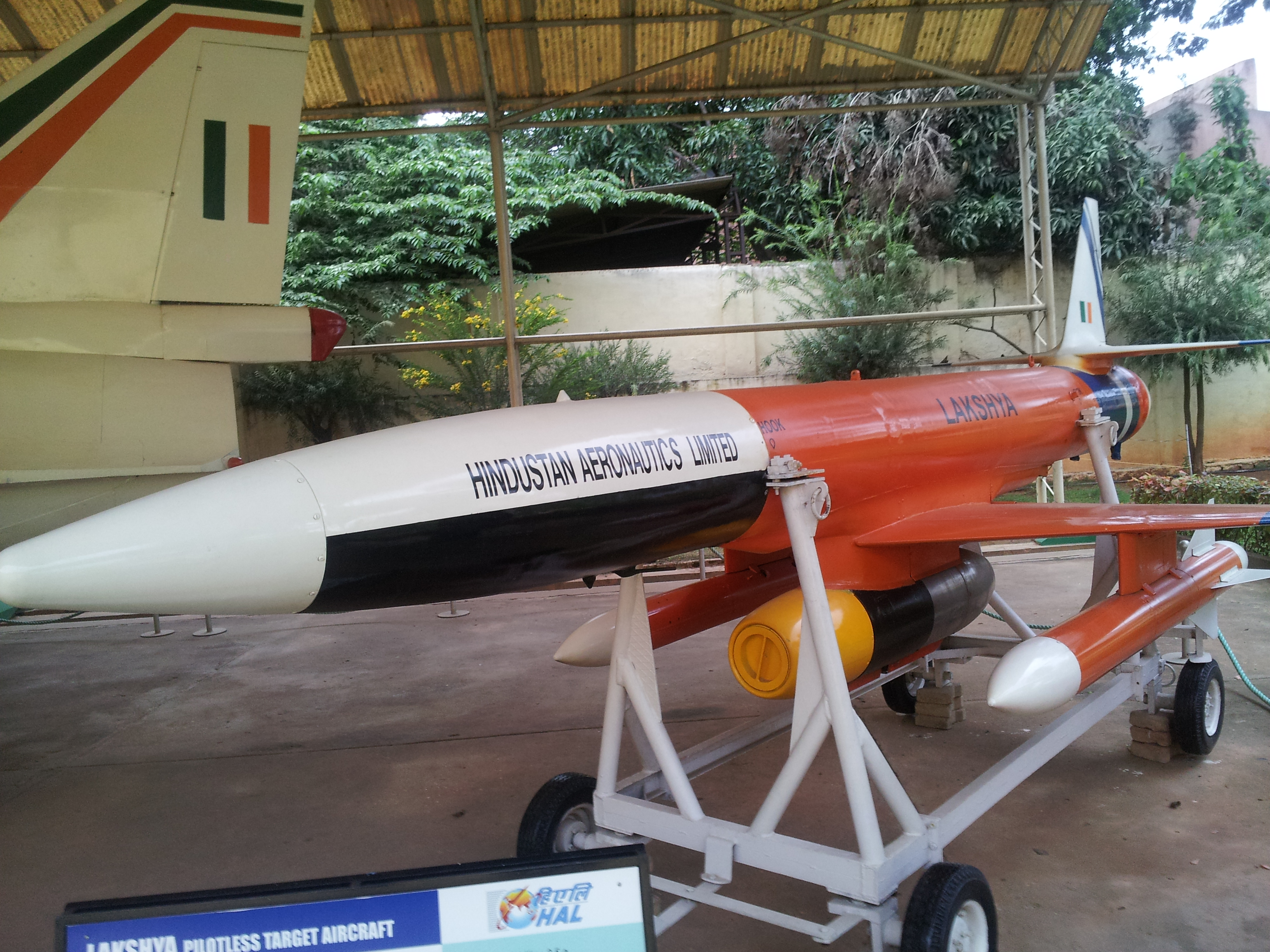
DRDO Lakshya high performance reusable aerial target system.

== See also ==
- List of aerospace museums
