= Blame the Dead =

1972 novel by Gavin Lyall

- First edition
- Author: Gavin Lyall
- Cover artist: Colin Andrews
- Language: English
- Genre: Thriller novel
- Publisher: Hodder & Stoughton
- Publication date: 1972
- Publication place: United Kingdom
- Media type: Print
- Pages: 376
- ISBN: 9781448200856
- Preceded by: Freedom's Battle: The War in the Air 1939-1945
- Followed by: Judas Country

Blame the Dead is the sixth novel by English author Gavin Lyall, first published in December 1972. It was followed by Judas Country, which was the last of his aviation novels.

Blame the Dead is an adventure thriller, a genre popular throughout the sixties. Lyall wrote a number of successful books in this genre before switching to espionage novels in the eighties. The novel concerns a private eye's effort to track down the murderer of an insurance underwriter. The murder takes place in France and the climax is set in Norway.

== Plot introduction ==
James Card, security consultant and ex-British Army intelligence officer takes on a job as bodyguard to Lloyd's of London underwriter Martin Fenwick for a trip to France. When his client is murdered, he sets out to track down the killer. His only clue is a children's colouring book in a plain brown paper wrapper. Fenwick’s widow is strangely without any sorrow at her husband’s death, but their son David, is grimly determined that he will find his father’s murderer regardless of the risk.

== Literary significance & criticism ==
The novel was praised the Chicago Tribune as "Lyall at his fleet and fearful best".

The New York Times noted that Lyall writes in an American style, verging on parody, but concluded that "he works surely and easily, sometimes even with self‐mockery" and that "Blame the Dead is well‐constructed — and, in its way, well‐written. It will give you full value for your money."
