= The Most Dangerous Game (novel) =

1964 novel by Gavin Lyall

- First edition cover
- Author: Gavin Lyall
- Language: English
- Genre: Spy; thriller
- Publisher: Hodder & Stoughton
- Publication date: 1964
- Publication place: United Kingdom
- Media type: Print (Hardcover & Paperback)
- Pages: 255 (hardcover edition); 224 (paperback edition)
- ISBN: 0-340-53023-5 (paperback edition)
- OCLC: 59148759

The Most Dangerous Game is a spy thriller by English author Gavin Lyall, first published in 1964. The plot of the novel is unrelated to that of Richard Connell's short story of the same name.

== Plot ==
Cover to a recent paperback edition

Bill Cary is a bush pilot living in Lapland in northern Finland, making a precarious living flying aerial survey flights looking for nickel deposits, and occasional charter cargo flights of dubious legitimacy in his beat-up old de Havilland Beaver. Towards the end of the flying season, a wealthy American hunter hires him to fly into a prohibited part of Finland near the Soviet border in order to hunt bear. Subsequently, he is assaulted by thugs when he refuses a charter contract to search for a lost Tsarist treasure, comes under suspicion from the Finnish police for smuggling when Tsarist-era gold sovereigns start turning up, and from the Finnish secret police for espionage. However, things get more serious when the wealthy American hunter's beautiful sister turns up to search for her brother, and his fellow bush pilots start getting killed off in a series of suspicious accidents. Cary suspects that the events he is increasingly involved in may stem from an incident in his wartime past.

== Awards ==
The Most Dangerous Game was a runner-up for the British Crime Writers' Association Gold Dagger Award in 1964.
