= Gold Dagger =

British crime fiction award

- Awarded for: Best crime novel of the year
- Country: United Kingdom
- Presented by: Crime Writers' Association (CWA)
- First award: 1955
- Most recent winner: Una Mannion; Tell Me What I Am (2024)

Highlights
- Most awards: Ruth Rendell (4)
- Most nominations: Mick Herron (6)
- Website: thecwa.co.uk

The CWA Gold Dagger is an award given annually by the Crime Writers' Association of the United Kingdom since 1960 for the best crime novel of the year.

From 1955 to 1959, the organization named their top honor as the Crossed Red Herring Award. From 1995 to 2002 the award acquired sponsorship from Macallan and was known as the Macallan Gold Dagger.

In 2006, because of new sponsorship from the Duncan Lawrie Bank, the award was officially renamed as the Duncan Lawrie Dagger, and gained a prize fund of £20,000. It was the biggest crime-fiction award in the world in monetary terms. In 2008, Duncan Lawrie Bank withdrew its sponsorship of the awards. As a result, the top prize is again called the Gold Dagger without a monetary award.

From 1969 to 2005, a Silver Dagger was awarded to the runner-up. When Duncan Lawrie acquired sponsorship, this award was dropped. After the sponsorship was withdrawn, this award was not reinstated.

Since its inception, the award has been given to 57 writers. Ruth Rendell has won the award a record four times, including two awards for the novels A Fatal Inversion and King Solomon's Carpet, published under the pseudonym Barbara Vine; this makes her the only writer who has won the award under different names. Rendell and James Lee Burke were nominated a record five times, and they were surpassed only by Mick Herron with six. Abir Mukherjee is the most nominated author in this category without a single win (4 nominations).

The Crime Writers' Association also awards the CWA Gold Dagger for Non-Fiction and several other "Dagger" awards.

== Winners ==
Winners and, where known, shortlisted titles for each year:

=== 1950s ===
Year	Author	Work
Crossed Red Herring Award
1955	Winston Graham ‡	The Little Walls
1955	Lee Howard	Blind Date
1955	Ngaio Marsh	Scales of Justice
1955	Margot Bennett	The Man Who Didn't Fly
1956	Edward Grierson ‡	The Second Man
1956	Sarah Gainham	Time Right Deadly
1956	Arthur Upfield	Man of Two Tribes
1956	J. J. Marric	Gideon's Week
1957	Julian Symons ‡	The Colour of Murder
1957	Ngaio Marsh	Off with His Head
1957	George Milner	Your Money or Your Life
1957	Douglas Rutherford	The Long Echo
1958	Margot Bennett ‡	Someone from the Past
1958	Margery Allingham	Hide My Eyes
1958	James Byrom	Or Be He Dead
1958	John Sherwood	Undiplomatic Exit
1959	Eric Ambler ‡	Passage of Arms
1959	James Mitchell	A Way Back
1959	Menna Gallie	Strike for a Kingdom

=== 1960s ===
Year	Author	Work
Gold Dagger
1960	Lionel Davidson ‡	The Night of Wenceslas
1960	Mary Stewart	My Brother Michael
1960	Julian Symons	The Progress of a Crime
1961	Mary Kelly ‡	The Spoilt Kill
1961	John le Carré	Call for the Dead
1961	Allan Prior	One Way
1962	Joan Fleming ‡	When I Grow Rich
1962	Eric Ambler	The Light of Day
1962	Colin Watson	Hopjoy Was Here
1963	John le Carré ‡	The Spy Who Came in from the Cold
1963	Nicolas Freeling	Gun Before Butter
1963	William Haggard	The High Wire
1964	H. R. F. Keating ‡	The Perfect Murder
1964	Gavin Lyall	The Most Dangerous Game
1964	Ross Macdonald	The Chill
1964	Patricia Highsmith	The Two Faces of January
1965	Ross Macdonald ‡	The Far Side of the Dollar
1965	Dick Francis	For Kicks
1965	Emma Lathen	Accounting for Murder
1965	Gavin Lyall	Midnight Plus One
1966	Lionel Davidson ‡	A Long Way to Shiloh
1966	John Bingham	The Double Agent
1966	John Ball	In the Heat of the Night
1967	Emma Lathen ‡	Murder Against the Grain
1967	Colin Watson	Lonely Heart 4122
1967	Eric Ambler	Dirty Story
1968	Peter Dickinson ‡	Skin Deep
1968	Nicholas Blake	The Private Wound
1968	Sébastien Japrisot	The Lady in the Car with Glasses and a Gun
1969	Peter Dickinson ‡	A Pride of Heroes
1969	Francis Clifford	Another Way of Dying
1969	Rex Stout	The Father Hunt

=== 1970s ===
Year	Author	Work
1970	Joan Fleming ‡	Young Man I Think You're Dying
1970	Anthony Price	The Labyrinth Makers
1971	James H. McClure ‡	The Steam Pig
1971	P. D. James	Shroud for a Nightingale
1972	Eric Ambler ‡	The Levanter
1972	Victor Canning	The Rainbird Pattern
1973	Robert Littell ‡	The Defection of A.J. Lewinter
1973	Gwendoline Butler	A Coffin for Pandora
1974	Anthony Price ‡	Other Paths to Glory
1974	Francis Clifford	The Grosvenor Square Goodbye
1975	Nicholas Meyer ‡	The Seven-Per-Cent Solution
1975	P. D. James	The Black Tower
1976	Ruth Rendell ‡	A Demon in My View
1976	James H. McClure	Rogue Eagle
1977	John le Carré ‡	The Honourable Schoolboy
1977	William McIlvanney	Laidlaw
1978	Lionel Davidson ‡	The Chelsea Murders
1978	Peter Lovesey	Waxwork
1979	Dick Francis ‡	Whip Hand
1979	Colin Dexter	Service of All the Dead

=== 1980s ===
Year	Author	Work
1980	H. R. F. Keating ‡	The Murder of the Maharaja
1980	Ellis Peters	Monk's Hood
1981	Martin Cruz Smith ‡	Gorky Park
1981	Colin Dexter	The Dead of Jericho
1982	Peter Lovesey ‡	The False Inspector Dew
1982	S. T. Haymon	Ritual Murder
1983	John Hutton ‡	Accidental Crimes
1983	William McIlvanney	The Papers of Tony Vietch
1984	B. M. Gill ‡	The Twelfth Juror
1984	Ruth Rendell	The Tree of Hands
1985	Paula Gosling ‡	Monkey Puzzle
1985	Dorothy Simpson	Last Seen Alive
1985	Andrew Taylor	Our Father's Lies
1985	Jill Paton Walsh	A Piece of Justice
1986	Ruth Rendell ‡	Live Flesh
1986	P. D. James	A Taste for Death
1987	Barbara Vine ‡	A Fatal Inversion
1987	Scott Turow	Presumed Innocent
1987	Liza Cody	Under Contract
1988	Michael Dibdin ‡	Ratking
1988	Sara Paretsky	Toxic Shock
1989	Colin Dexter ‡	The Wench Is Dead
1989	Desmond Lowden	The Shadow Run

=== 1990s ===
Year	Author	Work
1990	Reginald Hill ‡	Bones and Silence
1990	Mike Phillips	The Late Candidate
1990	John Harvey	Rough Treatment
1991	Barbara Vine ‡	King Solomon's Carpet
1991	Frances Fyfield	Deep Sleep
1991	Janet Neel	Death of a Partner
1991	Michael Dibdin	Dirty Tricks
1992	Colin Dexter ‡	The Way Through the Woods
1992	Liza Cody	Bucket Nut
1993	Patricia Cornwell ‡	Cruel and Unusual
1993	Sarah Dunant	Fatlands
1993	Robert Richardson	The Hand of Strange Children
1993	Janet Neel	Death Among the Dons
1994	Minette Walters ‡	The Scold's Bridle
1994	Peter Høeg	Miss Smilla's Feeling for Snow
1994	Val McDermid	Crack Down
1994	Sara Paretsky	Tunnel Vision
1995	Val McDermid ‡	The Mermaids Singing
1995	Peter Lovesey	The Summons
1995	Elizabeth Ironside	Death in the Garden
1995	Minette Walters	The Dark Room
1996	Ben Elton ‡	Popcorn
1996	Peter Lovesey	Bloodhounds
1996	Jessica Mann	A Private Enquiry
1997	Ian Rankin ‡	Black and Blue
1997	Janet Evanovich	Three to Get Deadly
1997	Frank Lean	The Reluctant Investigator
1998	James Lee Burke ‡	Sunset Limited
1998	Nicholas Blincoe	Manchester Slingback
1998	Michael Dibdin	A Long Finish
1998	Geoffrey Archer	Fire Hawk
1998	Reginald Hill	On Beulah Height
1998	George Pelecanos	King Suckerman
1999	Robert Wilson ‡	A Small Death in Lisbon
1999	Adrian Mathews	Vienna Blood
1999	Val McDermid	A Place of Execution
1999	Ian Rankin	Dead Souls
1999	Michael Connelly	Angels Flight
1999	Denise Danks	Phreak
1999	Frances Fyfield	Staring at the Light

=== 2000s ===
Year	Author	Work
2000	Jonathan Lethem ‡	Motherless Brooklyn
2000	Donna Leon	Friends in High Places
2000	James Lee Burke	Purple Cane Road
2000	Eliot Pattison	The Skull Mantra
2000	Lucy Wadham	Lost
2000	Martin Cruz Smith	Havana Bay
2001	Henning Mankell ‡	Sidetracked
2001	Giles Blunt	Forty Words for Sorrow
2001	Stephen Booth	Dancing with the Virgins
2001	Denise Danks	Baby Love
2001	George Pelecanos	Right as Rain
2001	Scott Phillips	The Ice Harvest
2002	José Carlos Somoza ‡	The Athenian Murders
2002	James Crumley	The Final Country
2002	Mark Billingham	Scaredy Cat
2002	James Lee Burke	Jolie Blon's Bounce
2002	Michael Connelly	City of Bones
2002	Minette Walters	Acid Row
2003	Minette Walters ‡	Fox Evil
2003	Morag Joss	Half-Broken Things
2003	Boris Akunin	The Winter Queen
2003	Robert Littell	The Company
2003	Carlo Lucarelli	Almost Blue
2003	Robert Wilson	The Blind Man of Seville
2004	Sara Paretsky ‡	Blacklist
2004	John Harvey	Flesh and Blood
2004	Mo Hayder	Tokyo
2004	Val McDermid	The Torment of Others
2004	James W. Nichol	Midnight Cab
2004	Laura Wilson	The Lover
2005	Arnaldur Indriðason ‡	Silence of the Grave
2005	Barbara Nadel	Deadly Web
2005	Karin Fossum	Calling Out for You
2005	Friedrich Glauser	In Matto's Realm
2005	Carl Hiaasen	Skinny Dip
2005	Fred Vargas	Seeking Whom He May Devour
Duncan Lawrie Dagger
2006	Ann Cleeves ‡	Raven Black
2006	Simon Beckett	The Chemistry of Death
2006	Thomas H. Cook	Red Leaves
2006	Frances Fyfield	Safer Than Houses
2006	Bill James	Wolves of Memory
2006	Laura Wilson	A Thousand Lies
2007	Peter Temple ‡	The Broken Shore
2007	Giles Blunt	The Fields of Grief
2007	James Lee Burke	Pegasus Descending
2007	Gillian Flynn	Sharp Objects
2007	Craig Russell	Brother Grimm
2007	C. J. Sansom	Sovereign
2008	Frances Fyfield ‡	Blood from Stone
2008	James Lee Burke	The Tin Roof Blowdown
2008	Colin Cotterill	The Coroner's Lunch
2008	Steve Hamilton	Night Work
2008	Laura Lippman	What the Dead Know
2008	R. N. Morris	A Vengeful Longing
Gold Dagger
2009	William Brodrick ‡	A Whispered Name
2009	Kate Atkinson	When Will There Be Good News?
2009	Mark Billingham	In the Dark
2009	Lawrence Block	Hit and Run
2009	M. R. Hall	The Coroner
2009	Gene Kerrigan	Dark Times in the City

=== 2010s ===
Year	Author	Work	Ref.
2010	Belinda Bauer ‡	Blacklands	
2010	S. J. Bolton	Blood Harvest	
2010	George Pelecanos	The Way Home	
2010	Karen Campbell	Shadowplay	
2011	Tom Franklin ‡	Crooked Letter, Crooked Letter	
2011	Steve Hamilton	The Lock Artist	
2011	A. D. Miller	Snowdrops	
2011	Denise Mina	The End of the Wasp Season	
2012	Gene Kerrigan ‡	The Rage	
2012	N. J. Cooper	Vengeance in Mind	
2012	M. R. Hall	The Flight	
2012	Chris Womersley	Bereft	
2013	Mick Herron ‡	Dead Lions	
2013	Belinda Bauer	Rubbernecker	
2013	Lauren Beukes	The Shining Girls	
2013	Becky Masterman	Rage Against the Dying	
2014	Wiley Cash ‡	This Dark Road to Mercy	
2014	Paula Daly	Keep Your Friends Close	
2014	Paul Mendelson	The First Rule of Survival	
2014	Louise Penny	How the Light Gets In	
2015	Michael Robotham ‡	Life or Death	
2015	Belinda Bauer	The Shut Eye	
2015	James Carlos Blake	The Rules of Wolfe	
2015	Robert Galbraith	The Silkworm	
2015	Sam Hawken	Missing	
2015	Stephen King	Mr. Mercedes	
2015	Attica Locke	Pleasantville	
2016	Bill Beverly ‡	Dodgers	
2016	Chris Brookmyre	Black Widow	
2016	Denise Mina	Blood Salt Water	
2016	Mick Herron	Real Tigers	
2017	Jane Harper ‡	The Dry	
2017	Belinda Bauer	The Beautiful Dead	
2017	Ray Celestin	Dead Man's Blues	
2017	Mick Herron	Spook Street	
2017	Derek B. Miller	The Girl in Green	
2017	Abir Mukherjee	A Rising Man	
2018	Steve Cavanagh ‡	The Liar	
2018	Mick Herron	London Rules	
2018	Dennis Lehane	Since We Fell	
2018	Attica Locke	Bluebird, Bluebird	
2018	Abir Mukherjee	A Necessary Evil	
2018	Emma Viskic	Resurrection Bay	
2019	M. W. Craven ‡	The Puppet Show	
2019	Claire Askew	All the Hidden Truths	
2019	Christobel Kent	What We Did	
2019	Donna Leon	Unto Us a Son Is Given	
2019	Derek B. Miller	American by Day	
2019	Benjamin Wood	A Station on the Path to Somewhere Better	

=== 2020s ===
Year	Author	Work	Ref.
2020	Michael Robotham ‡	Good Girl, Bad Girl	
2020	Claire Askew	What You Pay For	
2020	Lou Berney	November Road	
2020	John Fairfax	Forced Confessions	
2020	Mick Herron	Joe Country	
2020	Abir Mukherjee	Death in the East	
2021	Chris Whitaker ‡	We Begin at the End	
2021	S. A. Cosby	Blacktop Wasteland	
2021	Ben Creed	City of Ghosts	
2021	Nicci French	House of Correction	
2021	Robert Galbraith	Troubled Blood	
2021	Elly Griffiths	The Postscript Murders	
2021	Thomas Mullen	Midnight Atlanta	
2022	Ray Celestin ‡	Sunset Swing	
2022	Jacqueline Bublitz	Before You Knew My Name	
2022	S. A. Cosby	Razorblade Tears	
2022	John Hart	The Unwilling	
2022	Abir Mukherjee	The Shadows of Men	
2022	William Shaw	The Trawlerman	
2023	George Dawes Green ‡	The Kingdoms of Savannah	
2023	Vaseem Khan	The Lost Man of Bombay	
2023	Simon Mason	A Killing in November	
2023	Anna Mazzola	The Clockwork Girl	
2023	WC Ryan	The Winter Guest	
2023	Simon Van der Velde	The Silent Brother	
2024	Una Mannion ‡	Tell Me What I Am	
2024	Nilanjana Roy	Black River	
2024	Jesse Sutanto	Vera Wong's Unsolicited Advice for Murderers	
2024	Maz Evans	Over My Dead Body	
2024	Mick Herron	The Secret Hours	
2024	Dennis Lehane	Small Mercies	
2025	Anna Mazzola ‡	The Book of Secrets	
2025	D. V. Bishop	A Divine Fury	
2025	Bonnie Burke-Patel	I Died at Fallow Hall	
2025	R J Ellory	The Bell Tower	
2025	Tana French	The Hunter	
2025	Attica Locke	Guide Me Home	
2026	Abigail Dean ‡	The Death of Us	
2026	SA Cosby	King of Ashes	
2026	Holly Jackson	Not Quite Dead Yet	
2026	Vaseem Khan	The Girl In Cell A	
2026	Ariel Lawhon	The Frozen River	
2026	Laura Shepherd-Robinson	The Art of a Lie	

== Multiple awards and nominations ==
=== Gold Dagger ===
The following individuals received two or more Gold Dagger awards:

Wins	Author	Nominations
4	Ruth Rendell	5
2	Eric Ambler	4
2	Colin Dexter	4
2	Minette Walters	4
2	John le Carré	3
2	Lionel Davidson	2
2	Peter Dickinson	2
2	Joan Fleming	2
2	H. R. F. Keating	2
2	Michael Robotham	2

The following individuals received two or more Gold Dagger nominations:

Nominations	Author
6	Mick Herron
5	James Lee Burke
5	Ruth Rendell
4	Eric Ambler
4	Belinda Bauer
4	Colin Dexter
4	Frances Fyfield
4	Peter Lovesey
4	Val McDermid
4	Abir Mukherjee
4	Minette Walters
3	John le Carré
3	Michael Dibdin
3	P. D. James
3	Sara Paretsky
3	George Pelecanos
2	Claire Askew
2	Margot Bennett
2	Mark Billingham
2	Francis Clifford
2	Liza Cody
2	Michael Connelly
2	S. A. Cosby
2	Denise Danks
2	Lionel Davidson
2	Peter Dickinson
2	Joan Fleming
2	Dick Francis
2	Robert Galbraith
2	M. R. Hall
2	Steve Hamilton
2	Reginald Hill
2	H. R. F. Keating
2	Emma Lathen
2	Donna Leon
2	Gavin Lyall
2	Ross Macdonald
2	Ngaio Marsh
2	James H. McClure
2	William McIlvanney
2	Derek B. Miller
2	Denise Mina
2	Janet Neel
2	Anthony Price
2	Ian Rankin
2	Michael Robotham
2	Martin Cruz Smith
2	Julian Symons
2	Colin Watson
2	Laura Wilson
2	Robert Wilson

=== Silver Dagger ===
The following individuals received two or more Silver Dagger awards:

Wins	Author	Nominations
3	Peter Lovesey	4
3	P. D. James	3
2	Colin Dexter	4
2	Francis Clifford	2
2	William McIlvanney	2

=== Gold and Silver Daggers wins ===
The following individuals received both Gold and Silver Dagger awards:

- Colin Dexter
- James H. McClure
- Sara Paretsky
- Anthony Price
- Peter Lovesey
- Ruth Rendell

== Records ==
- Ngaio Marsh was the first writer to receive more than one nomination.
- Ross Macdonald was the first writer to receive two consecutive nominations
- Peter Dickinson is the first writer to receive two Gold Daggers. He and Ruth Rendell are the only ones to win in this category two years in a row.
- Joan Fleming is the first female to win two awards.
- Anthony Price is the first writer to win both the Gold and Silver Daggers.
- P.D. James and Peter Lovesey win a record three Silver Daggers. James also won the most Silver Daggers as the author who never won a Gold Dagger.
- Colin Dexter is the only writer to win both two Silver and two Gold Daggers.
- Ruth Rendell has won the Gold Dagger a record four times. She is also the only one to win the award under different names.
- Mick Herron have the most nominations with 6.
- Mick Herron has the most consecutive nominations (3).
- Abir Mukherjee has the most nominations without a win (4).
