= The Naked Runner =

1967 British film by Sidney J. Furie

- Original film poster
- Directed by: Sidney J. Furie
- Written by: Stanley Mann; Francis Clifford (novel)
- Produced by: Brad Dexter
- Starring: Frank Sinatra; Peter Vaughan; Derren Nesbitt; Edward Fox
- Cinematography: Otto Heller
- Edited by: Barrie Vince
- Music by: Harry Sukman
- Distributed by: Warner-Pathé Distributors; Warner Bros.-Seven Arts
- Release date: 19 July 1967
- Running time: 101 minutes
- Language: English
- Budget: $2.5 million
- Box office: $1,400,000 (US/ Canada)

The Naked Runner is a 1967 British espionage film directed by Sidney J. Furie and starring Frank Sinatra, Peter Vaughan and Edward Fox. It was written by Stanley Mann based on the 1966 novel of the same title by Francis Clifford.

It was the last film Sinatra made with Warner Bros. Pictures.

== Plot ==
Slattery, a British civil servant, is summoned to meet a minister. The British authorities had arrested a spy, Frenzel, who has now escaped from prison and is being transported overland to Moscow. It is imperative that Frenzel is prevented from passing on what he knows to the Soviet authorities, and Slattery is tasked with locating an assassin.

Unable to use any of his usual contacts, Slattery thinks of Sam Laker, who he worked with during the war. Laker is American, a former spy who now designs office furniture, and a widower who lives in London with his young son. Slattery knows that Laker has the necessary skills for the job, but must find a way to persuade him to kill Frenzel.

Laker has planned to visit a trade fair in Leipzig with his son, and Slattery persuades him to contact Karen while he is there. Laker knows her from the war, and there is history between them. After meeting Karen, Laker returns to the trade fair but is taken away at gunpoint to meet Colonel Hartmann of the East German security service. Hartmann tells Laker that he must travel to Copenhagen to carry out an assassination, or that his son will be killed. The target turns out to be Frenzel, and it is clear that Slattery and Hartmann are in cahoots.

Laker flies to Copenhagen and meets Anna, a British agent, who has booked a hotel room overlooking Frenzel's suite. He picks up a sniper's rifle that is to be used in the assassination but, when he returns to the hotel, Anna calls the police and Laker is arrested. Jackson, another British agent, eventually arranges his release and Laker, still carrying a case with the gun inside, goes in search Frenzel. However, Frenzel's plans have been changed and he does not arrive in Copenhagen.

It becomes apparent that the whole Copenhagen episode has been a ruse designed to increase Laker's stress levels, and to make him increasingly desperate. As a final measure he is sent a telegram saying that his son, who in reality is having a nice holiday with Hartmann, has been killed. As Slattery had anticipated, Laker now returns to Leipzig determined to kill the man responsible – Hartmann. He is able to take his rifle on the plane as hand luggage.

Laker contacts Ruth, another British agent, who agrees to help him to kill Hartmann. Slattery gives Ruth details of Frenzel's anticipated movements, pretending they are Hartmann's. The Russians, for reasons best known to themselves, transport Frenzel to the airport along a disused motorway where he is extremely vulnerable to an ambush. The distraught Laker kills Frenzel as Slattery had planned, and is then driven away by Slattery and Hartmann, who reveal that his son is alive after all.

== Cast ==
- Frank Sinatra as Sam Laker
- Peter Vaughan as Martin Slattery
- Derren Nesbitt as Colonel Hartmann
- Nadia Gray as Karen Gisevius
- Toby Robins as Ruth
- Inger Stratton as Anna
- Cyril Luckham as Cabinet minister
- Edward Fox as Ritchie Jackson
- J.A.B. Dubin-Behrmann as Joseph

== Production ==
=== Development ===
Sinatra was in need of a hit—Marriage on the Rocks and Assault on a Queen having flopped in the two previous years—so he put actor and trusted aide Brad Dexter in charge of finding a suitable vehicle. After negotiations for him to star in Harper fell through, The Naked Runner was chosen instead. Sinatra had been impressed with 1965's The Ipcress File and recruited its director Sidney J. Furie.

=== Casting ===
Sinatra was paid $1 million.

=== Filming ===
The film was shot on location in Europe. However, while in Copenhagen, Sinatra left the production to perform at a rally for California's Democratic governor Pat Brown who was running in the 1966 California gubernatorial election against Republican Ronald Reagan. After doing the campaign event, Sinatra decided he was not going to return to Europe. Instead, he informed the crew he wanted to finish all his outstanding scenes on a sound stage in Los Angeles.

Dexter and Furie decided to take the maverick action of finishing the film with a stand-in (James Payne) for Sinatra's remaining scenes, editing in close-ups from earlier shots in post-production and overdubbing the dialogue.

== Reception ==
The Monthly Film Bulletin wrote: "Something has gone sadly awry with this incredibly silly thriller, in which a hangdog Sinatra is shunted monotonously around as a pawn in an international spy game while everybody else reports his movements to everybody else several times over until one feels as if one were listening to the train announcements in a main line station. The adaptation from Francis Clifford's ingenious novel not only jettisons all suspense by revealing its mechanism from the outset (in the original, the reader is as much in the dark as the hero), but makes nonsense of all the fuss about coercing a freelance killer by placing three members of British Intelligence (any one of whom could have done the job as discreetly) within hailing distance at the moment of assassination. Not surprisingly, the film never even begins to get off the ground, but matters are not helped by Sidney Furie's direction, which is in the ponderously mannered style (all huge close-ups and self-consciously arty groupings) which marred The Ipcress File and swamped Southwest to Sonora."

Variety wrote that "Sinatra, whose personal magnetism and acting ability are unquestioned, is shot down by script. Peter Vaughan overacts part as the British agent."

Leslie Halliwell wrote: "Silly espionage thriller further marred by its director's penchant for making a zany composition of every frame."

In The Radio Times Guide to Films Robert Sellers gave the film 2/5 stars, writing: "This Stanley Mann-scripted slice of Cold War shenanigans is bland, thanks to the unappealing characters and the far-fetched narrative. … Sidney J Furie's gimmicky direction is jarring, while Sinatra can do nothing with a monotonous role that merely requires him to be shunted around like a pawn on a chessboard."
