= Jack Sherwood =

Jack Sherwood may refer to:

- Jack Sherwood (Gaelic footballer)
- Jack Sherwood (racing driver)

== See also ==
- John Sherwood (disambiguation)
