= Prix du Polar Européen =

French literary award

The Prix du Polar Européen (English: European Crime Fiction Prize) is a French literary prize awarded each year for the best crime or thriller novel by a European author in French or a French translation. The award was launched by the weekly magazine Le Point in 2003.

The jury is composed of police officers, publishing professionals and journalists. The prize was originally delivered to the winning author at the opening of the Nice Book Festival but, since 2007, it has been awarded at the Quais du Polar in Lyon.

== Juries ==
The President of the first jury was Charles Diaz, the former Inspector-General of the IGPN ("Inspection Générale de la Police Nationale" or General Inspectorate of the National Police). The President of the tenth jury, in 2012, was the French politician Jean-Louis Debré.

== Winners ==
Year	Author	Translator(s)	Author's nationality	Title (original publication year)	Ref
2003	Laura Grimaldi	Geneviève Leibrich	Italy	La Colpa (1990)	
2004	Bill James	Danièle & Pierre Bondil	United Kingdom	Protection (1988)	
2005	Laura Wilson	Marie-Lise Marlière	United Kingdom	The Lover (2004)	
2006	Giancarlo De Cataldo	Catherine Siné & Serge Quadruppani	Italy	Romanzo Criminale (2002)	
2007	John Harvey	Jean-Paul Gratias	United Kingdom	Ash and Bone (2005)	
2008	Arnaldur Indriðason	Éric Boury	Iceland	Kleifarvatn (2004)	
2009	Philip Kerr	Johan-Frédérik Hel-Guedj	United Kingdom	The One From the Other (2006)	
2010	Pierre Lemaitre		France	Cadres Noirs	
2011	Declan Hughes	Aurélie Tronchet	Ireland	The Wrong Kind of Blood (2006)	
2012	Víctor del Árbol	Claude Bleton	Spain	The Sadness of the Samurai (2011)	
2013	Petros Markaris	Michel Volkovitch	Greece	Liquidations à la grecque (2012)	
2014	Hervé Le Corre		France	Après la guerre (2014)	
2015	Sascha Arango	Dominique Autrand	Germany	Die Wahrheit und andere Lügen (2014)	
2016	Olivier Norek		France	Surtensions	
2017	Hannelore Cayre		France	La Daronne	
2018	Malin Persson Giolito	Laurence Mennerich	Sweden	Quicksand (2016)	
2019	Tim Willocks	Benjamin Legrand	United Kingdom	La Mort selon Turner	
2020	Abir Mukherjee	Fanchita Gonzalez-Batlle	United KingdomIndia	L'attaque du Calcutta-Darjeeling	
2021	Jurica Pavicic	Olivier Lannuzel	Croatia	L'eau rouge	
2022	Victor Guilbert		France	Terra Nullius	
2023	Jacky Schwartzmann		France	Shit!	
2024	Davide Longo	Marianne Faurobert	Italy	L'Affaire Bramard	
2025	Vera Buck	Brice Germain	Germany	Les Enfants loups	
