= The Coroner's Lunch =

2004 novel by Colin Cotterill

- First edition cover
- Author: Colin Cotterill
- Language: English
- Series: Dr. Siri Paiboun
- Genre: Crime novel
- Publisher: Soho Press
- Publication date: 15 December 2004
- Publication place: United States
- Media type: Print (Hardback)
- Pages: 272
- ISBN: 1-56947-376-5
- OCLC: 54960595
- Dewey Decimal: 823/.92 22
- LC Class: PR6053.O778 C67 2004
- Followed by: Thirty-Three Teeth

The Coroner's Lunch is a crime novel by British author Colin Cotterill first published in 2004. It is the first installment in the Dr. Siri Paiboun series, set in the Lao People's Democratic Republic during the 1970s.

The Coroner's Lunch was a finalist for the 2005 Barry Award for Best First Novel and the 2008 Gold Dagger.

== Plot summary ==
Despite a total lack of training, an utter dearth of experience, and a complete absence of inclination, Dr. Siri Paiboun has just been appointed state coroner for the Lao People's Democratic Republic. It's 1976; the royal family has been deposed, the professional classes have fled, and the communists have taken over. And 72-year-old Siri—a communist for convenience and a wry old reprobate by nature—has got the coroner's job because he's the only doctor left in Laos.

But when the wife of a Party leader is wheeled into the morgue and the bodies of tortured Vietnamese soldiers start bobbing to the surface of a Laotian lake, all eyes turn to the new coroner. Faced with official cover-ups and an emerging international crisis, Siri will be forced to enlist old friends, tribal shamans, forensic deduction, spiritual acumen, and some good old-fashioned sleuthing before he can discover quite what's going on...

== Reception ==
The Coroner's Lunch received starred reviews from Booklist and Kirkus Reviews, who wrote, "This series kickoff is an embarrassment of riches: Holmesian sleuthing, political satire, and droll comic study of a prickly late bloomer."

Publishers Weekly noted that the book included a "minor detour into the implausible and a later, jarring change in viewpoint" but otherwise stated that "this debut mystery, with its convincing and highly interesting portrayal of an exotic locale, marks the author as someone to watch".
