= Geoffrey Archer (writer) =

British writer (born 1944)

Geoffrey Archer (born 21 May 1944) is a British writer of fiction from London. He specialises in military adventures and spy thrillers and created the character Sam Packer.

== Career ==
Geoffrey Archer was born and grew up in north London and had an interest in fiction and drama from an early age. He attended Highgate School.

After several false starts in his choice of career, Geoffrey Archer moved into journalism. He started with a local television station in Southampton as a trainee researcher, then moved first to Anglia TV in Norwich and then to Tyne-Tees TV in Newcastle as an on-screen journalist. He started as a reporter with ITN in 1969. He covered the troubles in Northern Ireland in the 1970s and the civil war in Beirut in 1976, was allowed to travel with a Polaris nuclear submarine, and eventually became Defence Correspondent for ITN. These experiences prompted him to begin writing stories with military and spy themes.

In 1995 Archer left ITN to concentrate on writing full-time. In 1998 his novel Fire Hawk was short-listed for the Crime Writers' Gold Dagger Award.

== Personal life ==
Geoffrey Archer lives on Kew Green in Kew, London. He and his wife Eva have two children.

== Books ==
- 1988 – Sky Dancer
- 1989 – Shadow Hunter
- 1993 – Eagle Trap
- 1995 – Scorpion Trail
- 1997 – Java Spider
- 1998 – Fire Hawk
- 2001 – The Lucifer Network
- 2002 – The Burma Legacy
- 2004 – Dark Angel
