= Life or Death (novel) =

Book by Michael Robotham

- First UK edition (publ. Sphere Books)
- Author: Michael Robotham
- Language: English
- Genre: Crime novel
- Publisher: Hachette, Australia
- Publication date: 2014
- Publication place: Australia
- Media type: Print (Paperback)
- Pages: 434
- ISBN: 9780751552904
- Preceded by: Watching You
- Followed by: Close Your Eyes

Life or Death (2014) is a crime novel by Australian author Michael Robotham. It won the 2015 Crime Writers' Association Gold Dagger Award. This is his first book to not involve either of his two main characters; Joe O'Loughlin and Vincent Ruiz.

== Plot summary ==
Audie Palmer escapes from a Texas jail the day before the end of his ten-year sentence for armed robbery and second-degree murder. His friend Moss Webster is mysteriously released from the same prison and told to find Palmer and, if possible, the money missing from the robbery of the armoured van; money that has never been recovered.

== Notes ==
- Dedication: For Isabella
- Epigraphs:

"Life can be magnificent and overwhelming – That is its whole tragedy. Without beauty, love, or danger it would almost be easy to live." Albert Camus

"To be, or not to be: that is the question." William Shakespeare

== Reviews ==
Jeff Popple in The Sydney Morning Herald found the novel, at its core, "a gripping thriller". Marilyn Stasio in The New York Times noted that the author "isn't entirely at ease with the Texas vernacular, but he's responsive enough to the idiosyncrasies of the culture".

== Awards and nominations ==
- 2015 winner Crime Writers' Association Gold Dagger Award
- 2015 shortlisted Australian Book Industry Awards (ABIA) — Australian General Fiction Book of the Year
- 2016 finalist Barry Award
- 2016 shortlisted Edgar Allan Poe Award for Best Novel
