= Lucy Wadham =

British writer (born 1964)

Lucy Wadham (born 1964) is a British novelist, poet, screenwriter and writer of crime fiction. She has also written an autobiographical account of her life in France, The Secret Life of France (2009).

Wadham was born in London and educated at Magdalen College, Oxford. In 1989, she worked as a news assistant at the BBC Paris bureau and has been a freelance print journalist since 1994. She has contributed regularly to The Guardian, The Spectator, and the New Statesman. She lives in France with her four children.

Her first novel, Lost (2000), a thriller set in Corsica, was shortlisted for the Macallan Gold Dagger Award. The second novel, Castro's Dream (2003), about the Basque separatist movement ETA, is set in the Basque Country. Greater Love (2007), set in Portugal, Paris and Morocco in 2001, tells the story of Aisha and her quest to understand her twin brother's conversion to Islam. Wadham's 2009 book, The Secret Life of France, is part memoir and part essay focussing on the cultural differences between Britain and France. She writes a blog on the same theme under the same name. Her 2013 book, Heads and Straights, part of Penguin's series celebrating the 150th anniversary of the London Underground, traces her family's recent history through the lens of social class provided by growing up in Chelsea during the rise of punk rock.

In 2020 Wadham's first collection of poetry, 'Fold' published by Pindrop Press, was shortlisted for the Seamus Heaney First Poetry Collection Prize.

== Bibliography ==
- Lost, Faber and Faber, 2000, ISBN 0-571-20551-8
- Castro's Dream, Faber and Faber, 2003, ISBN 0-571-21638-2
- Greater Love, Faber and Faber, 2007, ISBN 0-571-23489-5
- The Secret Life of France, Faber and Faber, 2009, ISBN 0-571-23611-1
- Heads and Straights, Penguin, 2013, ISBN 1846146399
- Parfaite, L'Avant Scène Théâtre - Collection des Quatre-Vents, 2014, ISBN 978-2-7498-1303-5
- Fold, Pindrop Press, 2020, ISBN 1999355946
