= Thirty-Three Teeth =

2005 crime novel by Colin Cotterill

- First edition book cover
- Author: Colin Cotterill
- Publisher: Soho Crime
- Publication date: January 1, 2005
- Award: Dilys Award (2006)
- ISBN: 9781569473887
- Preceded by: The Coroner's Lunch
- Followed by: Disco For The Departed

Thirty-Three Teeth is a crime novel by British author Colin Cotterill and published in 2005 by Soho Press. It won the 2006 Dilys Award.

== Plot summary ==
When the Malay Black bear left its cage in the zoo garden of Vientiane's Lan Xang Hotel few people were saw mauled bodies turning up in the morgue. Very few that is, apart from Dr. Siri Paiboun the only coroner in the Lao People's Republic. Seventy-two-year-old Siri and his team felt something just doesn't add up.

In Luang Prabang, meanwhile, plans are afoot to finally rid the country of its royal heritage. The new socialist government is about to send the royal family to a re-education camp and exorcise the spirits of the old kings. Siri is sent to the historic capital to solve two mysteries: what killed a man found on a crumpled bicycle, and what caused the deaths of two bodies charred beyond recognition and missing their feet? What is so important that a military helicopter should be provided to whisk him north at a moment's notice?

Once there, Siri calls on his spiritual connections to help solve these cases. But he reawakens the souls of the phibob, the malevolent ghosts still seeking revenge on the doctor for past misdeeds. He enlists the help of the royal shaman and finally learns the true intentions of the phibob and of his own distinguished dynasty. Before he can return to his work he has to survive the phibob attempt on his life, unmask the betrayer of the king and argue his own defense against charges of treachery.

With Siri out of town, it is left to Dtui his nursing assistant to investigate the killings in Vientiane. She has her first unpleasant encounter with a Russian circus trainer, gets access to secret Party files, and soon becomes the only person in Laos arguing against the death warrant on the old Malay bear. But whilst searching for who or whatever it is murdering women and draining them of their blood, Dtui disappears.

With the moon full, and three victims already on the morgue slab, Dr. Siri has four hours to find his assistant before she becomes the fourth.

== Reception ==
In a starred review, Kirkus Reviews called this second novel in the series "as entertaining as" the first and noted that "clever chapter titles [...] put tongue even further in cheek".

Publishers Weekly wrote, "Paiboun's droll wit and Cotterill's engaging plot twists keep things energetic; the rather grisly murders are offset by comedy [...] The elegant, elderly Paiboun seems an unlikely vehicle to carry a series [...], but he does so with charm and aplomb.

Booklist also reviewed the novel.

== Awards ==
Thirty-Three Teeth won the 2006 Dilys Award presented by the Independent Mystery Booksellers Association.
