= Anthony Price =

British author (1928–2019)

- Born: John Allan Anthony Price; 16 August 1928; Rickmansworth Hertfordshire, England
- Died: 30 May 2019 (aged 90); Blackheath London, England
- Education: The King's School, Canterbury
- Alma mater: Merton College, Oxford
- Occupation: Novelist
- Spouse: Ann Stone
- Children: James, Simon, and Kate
- Writing career
- Period: 1970–1990
- Genre: Thriller
- Notable awards: Silver Dagger 1971; Gold Dagger 1974

Alan Anthony Price (16 August 1928 – 30 May 2019) was an English author of espionage thrillers.

== Early life ==
Price was born in Rickmansworth, Hertfordshire, England. He attended The King's School, Canterbury and served in the British Army from 1947 to 1949, reaching the rank of captain. He read history at Merton College, Oxford, from 1949 to 1952, and was awarded an MA in 1956.

== Career ==
Price was a journalist with the Westminster Press from 1952 to 1988, as well as the editor of the Oxford Times from 1972 to 1988. He was the author of nineteen novels in the Dr David Audley/Colonel Jack Butler series. These books focus on a group of counter-intelligence agents who work for an organization loosely based on the real MI5.

== Death ==
Price died in Blackheath, London, from chronic obstructive pulmonary disease on 30 May 2019, at the age of 90.

== Bibliography ==
=== Novels ===
- The Labyrinth Makers (1970) UK; (1971) US; winner of Silver Dagger Award.
- The Alamut Ambush (1971) UK; (1972) US
- Colonel Butler's Wolf (1972) UK; (1973) US
- October Men (1973) UK; (1974) US
- Other Paths to Glory (1974) UK; (1975) US; winner of Gold Dagger Award, and shortlisted for the Dagger of Daggers, a special award given in 2005 by the Crime Writers' Association(CWA) to celebrate its 50th anniversary.
- Our Man in Camelot (1975) UK; (1976) US
- War Game (1976) UK; (1977) US
- The '44 Vintage (1978) UK & US
- Tomorrow's Ghost (1979) UK & US
- The Hour of the Donkey (1980) UK & US
- Soldier No More (1981) UK; (1981) US
- The Old Vengeful (1982) UK; (1983) US
- Gunner Kelly (1983) UK; (1984) US
- Sion Crossing (1984) UK & US
- Here Be Monsters (1985) UK & US
- For the Good of the State (1986) UK; (1987) US
- A New Kind of War (1987) UK; (1988) US
- A Prospect of Vengeance (1988) UK; (1990) US
- The Memory Trap (1989)

=== Short stories ===
- A Green Boy – first published in Winter's Crimes 5 (1973)
- The Boudicca Killing – first published in Winter's Crimes 11 (1979)
- The Berzin Lecture – first published in Winter's Crimes 15 (1983)
- The Chinaman's Garden – first published in John Creasey's Crime Collection 1984 (1984)
- The Road to Suez – first published in The Rigby File (1989), ed. Tim Heald

=== Non-fiction ===
- The Eyes of the Fleet: A Popular History of Frigates and Frigate Captains 1793–1815 (1990)
