= Michael Robotham =

Australian writer (born 1960)

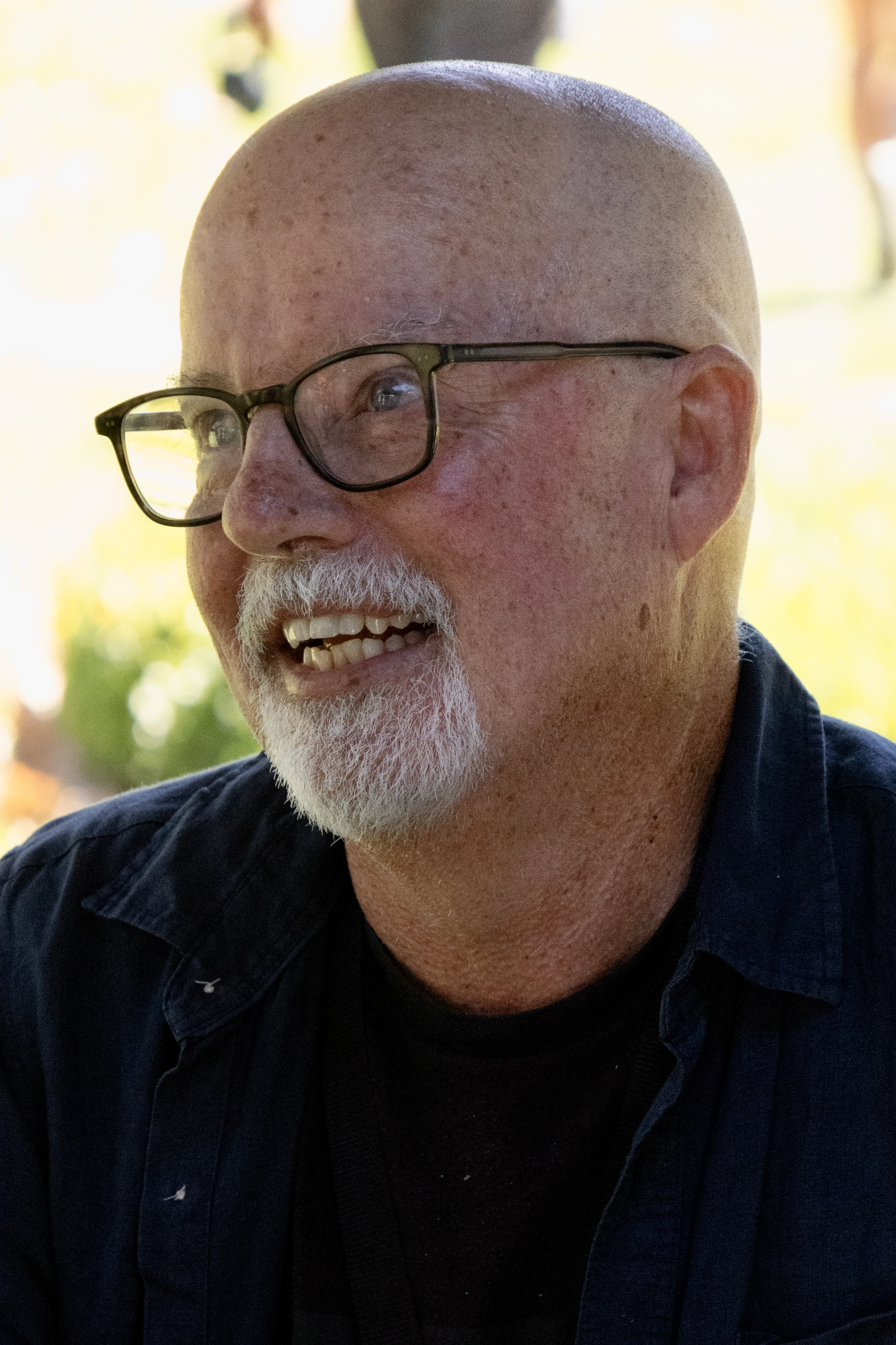
- Robotham at the 2025 Adelaide Writers' Week
- Born: 9 November 1960 (age 65); Casino, New South Wales, Australia
- Writing career
- Language: English
- Years active: 1975–
- Notable work: Life or Death
- Notable awards: The CWA Gold Dagger, 2015, 2020

Michael Robotham (born 9 November 1960) is an Australian crime fiction writer who has twice won the CWA Gold Dagger award for best novel and twice been shortlisted for the Edgar Award for best novel. His eldest child is Alexandra Hope Robotham, professionally known as Alex Hope, an Australian producer, songwriter, and multi-instrumentalist.

== Career ==
Robotham was born in Casino, New South Wales, and went to school in Gundagai and Coffs Harbour. In February 1979 he began a journalism cadetship on the Sydney afternoon newspaper The Sun and later worked for The Sydney Morning Herald as a court reporter and police roundsman.

In 1986, he went to London, where he worked as a reporter and sub-editor for various UK national newspapers before becoming a staff feature writer on The Mail on Sunday in 1989. As a feature writer, Robotham was among the first people to view the letters and diaries of Tsar Nicholas II and his wife Empress Alexandra, unearthed in the Moscow State Archives in 1991. He also gained access to Stalin's Hitler files, which had been missing for nearly fifty years until a cleaner stumbled upon a cardboard box that had been misplaced and misfiled. The archives also revealed secrets about Rasputin and the nuclear accident at Chernobyl.

Robotham rose to become deputy features editor of The Mail on Sunday before resigning in May 1993 and accepting freelancing contracts with a number of British newspapers and magazines. In November 1993 he accepted his first ghostwriting commission, helping Nottingham social worker Margaret Humphreys to pen her autobiography, Empty Cradles. Published in 1994, it told the story of how she uncovered the truth behind Britain's Child Migrant Program, which saw more than 100,000 children sent abroad between 1850 and 1967, and established the Child Migrant Trust to reunite children with their families. In 2011 Empty Cradles became the basis of the film Oranges and Sunshine directed by Jim Loach and starring Emily Watson as Margaret Humphreys and Hugo Weaving and David Wenham as two of the child migrants.

Robotham went on to collaborate on fifteen "autobiographies" for people in the arts, politics, the military and sport. Twelve of these titles became Sunday Times bestsellers and sold more than 2 million copies. These books included the autobiographies of Spice Girl Geri Halliwell, British comedy actor Ricky Tomlinson and sixties musical legend Lulu.

In 1996, Robotham returned to Australia with his family and continued writing full-time. In 2002, a partial manuscript of his first novel, The Suspect, became the subject of a bidding war at the London Book Fair. It was later translated into 24 languages and sold over a million copies around the world. His books have since won, or been shortlisted for numerous awards including the UK and US.

Eight of his 'Joe O'Loughlin novels' have been turned into TV movies in Germany (situated in Hamburg), and an English-language TV series based on the first Joe O'Loughlin novel, The Suspect, began filming in October 2021 in London and Liverpool with Aidan Turner in the lead role, produced by World Production. His stand-alone novel The Secrets She Keeps was turned into a six-part TV series by Network 10 in Australia and became one of the most watched TV shows on BBC1 in 2020. A second series of The Secrets She Keeps began filming in Sydney in December 2021. Another standalone, Life or Death has been optioned for film in the US.

== Awards and nominations ==
- Ned Kelly Awards for Crime Writing, Best Novel, 2005: winner for Lost
- Ned Kelly Awards for Crime Writing, Best Novel, 2007: shortlisted for The Night Ferry
- Crime Writers' Association (UK), Ian Fleming Steel Dagger, 2007: shortlisted for The Night Ferry
- Ned Kelly Awards for Crime Writing, Best Novel, 2008: winner for Shatter
- Crime Writers' Association (UK), The CWA Ian Fleming Steel Dagger, Best Thriller, 2008: shortlisted for Shatter
- ITV Thriller Awards (UK), Breakthrough Novelist 2008: shortlisted for Shatter
- Crime Writers' Association (UK), The CWA Gold Dagger, Best Crime Novel, 2013: shortlisted for Say You're Sorry
- Crime Writers' Association (UK), The CWA Gold Dagger, Best Crime Novel, 2015: winner for Life or Death
- Edgar Award for Best Novel, 2020: finalist for Good Girl, Bad Girl
- Crime Writers' Association (UK), The CWA Gold Dagger, Best Crime Novel, 2020: winner for Good Girl Bad Girl
- Crime Writers Association (UK), Ian Fleming Steel Dagger, 2021: winner for When She Was Good

== Personal ==
His eldest child is the ARIA- and APRA Award-winning songwriter, producer and musician Alex Hope.

== Bibliography ==
=== Joseph O'Loughlin series ===
- The Suspect (2004) ISBN 978-0-7515-4417-6
- Lost (2005) (aka The Drowning Man) ISBN 978-0-316-25227-0
- Shatter (2008)
- Bleed For Me (2010) ISBN 978-0-7515-4109-0
- The Wreckage (2011) ISBN 978-1-84744-220-8
- Say You're Sorry (2012) ISBN 978-0-3162-2124-5
- Watching You (2013) ISBN 978-1-8474-4527-8
- Close Your Eyes (2015) ISBN 978-0-7515-5288-1
- The Other Wife (2018) ISBN 978-0-7515-6282-8

=== Cyrus Haven series ===
- Good Girl, Bad Girl (2019) ISBN 978-0751573459
- When She Was Good (2020) ISBN 978-1982103637
- Lying Beside You (2022) ISBN 978-0751581577
- Storm Child (2024) ISBN 978-1668030998

=== Philomena McCarthy series ===
- When You are Mine (2021) ISBN 978-0751581560
- The White Crow (2025) ISBN 978-0-7336-5134-2

=== Stand-alone novels ===
- The Night Ferry (2007)
- Bombproof (2008) ISBN 978-0-7515-4204-2
- Life or Death (2014) ISBN 978-0-7515-5290-4
- The Secrets She Keeps (2017) ISBN 978-0-7515-6276-7
- Tell Me Something True (2026) ISBN 978-1-4087-2263-3

== Neben der Spur - Television film series Germany, ZDF ==
- Adrenalin (The Suspect) 2014
- Amnesie (Lost) 2016
- Todeswunsch (Bleed for Me) 2016
- Dein Wille geschehe (Shatter) 2017
- Sag, es tut dir leid (Say You’re Sorry) 2018
- Erlöse mich (Watching You) 2020
- Schließe deine Augen (Close your Eyes) 2021
- Die andere Frau (The Other Wife) 2022
