= Denise Danks =

British writer

- Born: 1953 (age 72–73)
- Education: University of Exeter
- Occupations: Novelist; journalist
- Writing career
- Genre: Crime fiction
- Notable awards: Raymond Chandler Award (1994)

Denise Danks (born 1953) is a British novelist and journalist. She has twice been shortlisted for the Gold Dagger by the Crime Writers' Association. In 1994 she became the first woman to receive the Chandler award. Before becoming a novelist, she was a computer journalist based in Wanstead, East London.

== Early life ==
Danks was born in 1953. Her mother was Greek and her father was an English RAF pilot. She is a graduate of St Luke's Campus, University of Exeter. After graduation, she joined The West Briton newspaper as a technology reporter. She left journalism to concentrate on fiction in 1987.

== Novels ==
Danks has written a series of novels featuring Georgina Powers, the character originally created by Enid Blyton for the children's series, The Famous Five. In Danks's novels, George is an adult and has become a computer journalist and amateur detective.

In 1994, the Fulbright Program selected Danks as the winner of a Raymond Chandler Award, following a recommendation by Ian Rankin. The prize paid for her to travel to California, where she spent six months working on a proposal for a television crime drama.

== Selected works ==
=== Georgina Powers ===
- Pizza House Crash (1989, Futura; also published as User Deadly in the United States)
- Better Off Dead (1991, Macdonald & Co)
- Frame Grabber (1992, Constable & Co)
- Wink a Hopeful Eye (1993, Macmillan)
- Phreak (1998, Victor Gollancz)
- Baby Love (2001, Orion)

=== Standalone ===
- Torso (1999, Victor Gollancz)

=== Short stories ===
- "Right Arm Man" collected in London Noir (1994, Serpent's Tail, edited by Maxim Jakubowski)
