= Joan Fleming =

British writer

Joan Margaret Fleming (27 March 1908 – 15 November 1980) was a British writer of crime and thriller novels. Her novel The Deeds of Dr Deadcert was made into the film Rx Murder (1958), and she won the Gold Dagger award twice, for When I Grow Rich (1962) and Young Man I Think You're Dying (1970).

== Family background and early life ==
She was born at Horwich, Lancashire to Elizabeth and David Gibson, her father being then managing director of the Horwich Locomotive Works. She attended the Brighthelmstone School for Girls, but left without qualifications and moved to London at the age of 18 when her father was promoted as a marine engineer, although he died a year later. She was later educated at the City Literary Institute and the University of Lausanne.

She married Norman Bell Beattie Fleming, a Harley Street ophthalmic surgeon, in 1932, and had four children. One of them died as a child, but Penelope, Rowan and David Fleming survived her. Her death in 1980 was registered in the Barnet district of North London.

== Writing career ==
Her writing originally grew out of telling bed-time stories to her children, and she wrote five children's books before her first adult crime novel, Two Lovers Too Many (1949). She went on to write over thirty crime novels, earning a significant readership and winning the Gold Dagger award twice, as well as penning a guide book, Shakespeare's Country (1962) and her later Gothic novels, such as Dirty Butter for Servants (1972).

Perhaps her best-loved character, the Turkish philosopher detective Nuri Bey Izkirlak, features in two of her books, When I Grow Rich (1962) and Nothing is the Number When You Die (1965).

== Bibliography ==
- Two Lovers Too Many (1949)
- A Daisy Chain for Satan (1950)
- The Gallows in My Garden (1951)
- The Man Who Looked Back (1951); also published as A Cup of Cold Poison
- Polly Put the Kettle On (1952)
- The Good and the Bad (1953)
- He Ought To Be Shot (1955)
- The Deeds of Dr Deadcert (1955); also published as The Merry Widower
- You Can't Believe Your Eyes (1957)
- Maiden's Prayer (1957)
- Malice Matrimonial (1959)
- Miss Bones (1959)
- The Man from Nowhere (1960)
- In the Red (1961)
- Shakespeare's Country (1962)
- When I Grow Rich (1962); Gold Dagger Award
- Death of a Sardine (1963)
- The Chill and the Kill (1964)
- Nothing is the Number When You Die (1965)
- Midnight Hag (1966)
- No Bones About It (1967)
- Kill or Cure (1968)
- Hell's Belle (1968)
- Young Man I Think You're Dying (1970); Gold Dagger Award
- Screams From a Penny Dreadful (1971)
- Grim Death and the Barrow Boys (1971)
- Dirty Butter for Servants (1972)
- Alas, Poor Father (1973)
- You Won't Let Me Finish (1973)
- How to Live Dangerously (1974)
- Too Late! Too Late! the Maiden Cried (1975)
- ...To Make an Underworld (1976)
- Every Inch a Lady (1977)
- The Day of the Donkey Derby (1978)
