= Paul Mendelson (novelist) =

British novelist

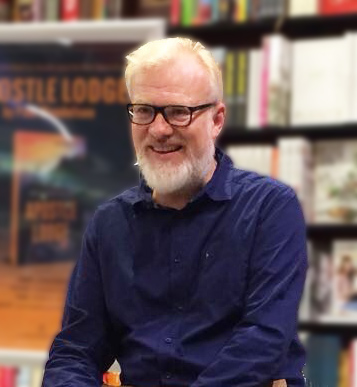
- Mendelson in 2017
- Born: 14 January 1965 (age 61); London, England, UK
- Occupations: Novelist, writer, lecturer
- Writing career
- Period: 1989–present
- Genres: Crime thriller, psychological thriller, thriller, non-fiction, mind sport
- Notable work: The First Rule of Survival
- Website: www.paulmendelson.co.uk

Paul Mendelson (born 14 January 1965) is a British Crime fiction novelist and contract bridge and poker author.

His first novel The First Rule of Survival was shortlisted for CWA Goldsboro Gold Dagger 2014. The follow-up, The Serpentine Road, published in 2015 was long listed for CWA Goldsboro Gold Dagger 2015. His third novel, The History of Blood was published in 2016. His fourth novel was Apostle Lodge, published in 2018. He has written extensively on bridge, on which he is considered a leading author, and is the columnist for the Financial Times and many other publications.

== Written works ==
=== Published novels ===
- The First Rule of Survival, Constable & Robinson, 2014
- The Serpentine Road, Constable Crime, 2015
- The History of Blood, Constable Crime, 2016
- Apostle Lodge, Constable Crime, 2018

=== Other published works ===
- Mendelson's Guide to the Bidding Battle. Cambridge, UK: Colt Books, 1998. ISBN 0-905899-86-5.
- Bridge for Beginners: A Step-By-Step Guide To One Of The Most Challenging Card Games, Lyons Press, 2004
- Texas Hold 'Em Poker: Begin and Win, Elliot Right Way Books, 2005
- Texas Hold'em Poker: Win Online, Elliot Right Way Books, 2007
- Bridge: Winning Ways to Play Your Cards, Right Way, 2008
- The Mammoth Book of Poker (Mammoth Books), Running Press, 2008
- Control the Bidding: The Right Way to Secure the Battleground in Bridge, Elliot Right Way Books, 2008
- The Right Way to Play Bridge, Right Way, 2008
- The Mammoth Book of Casino Games, Running Press, 2010
- Mendelson's Guide to Duplicate Bridge, Dolman Scott Ltd, 2011
- 121 Tips for Better Bridge, Ebury Press, 2011
- The Golden Rules Of Bridge, How To Books Ltd, 2014
