= William Brodrick (writer) =

British novelist

William Brodrick (born 31 January 1960) is a British novelist, famous in particular for his first novel The Sixth Lamentation, which was selected for the Richard and Judy Book Club. He also won the Crime Writers' Association Gold Dagger award in 2009 for his novel A Whispered Name.

== Life and career ==
Brodrick joined the order of the Augustinians after obtaining his A-levels and then, following the Order's advice, attended Heythrop College, University of London where he read philosophy and theology. He subsequently left the Order and completed the Common Professional Examination (Law) course in Manchester. After passing his Bar Finals, Brodrick moved to Newcastle upon Tyne where he practised as a barrister for ten years.

In his tenth year of practice, Brodrick had a change of vocation and wrote his first novel, The Sixth Lamentation, in his spare time. The international success of this first stride into the world of writing allowed Brodrick to leave his chambers and move to Normandy, France where he became a novelist full-time. He wrote six novels in the Father Anselm series and, subsequently, four under the pen name John Fairfax (Summary Justice, Blind Defence, Forced Confessions and Fatal Proof). He still lives in the Normandy village he originally moved to with his wife and three children.

== Works ==
=== Father Anselm series ===
1. The Sixth Lamentation (1999)
2. The Gardens of the Dead (2006)
3. A Whispered Name (2008)
4. The Day of the Lie (2012)
5. The Discourtesy of Death (2013)
6. The Silent Ones (2015)

=== Benson and de Vere series (as John Fairfax) ===
1. Summary Justice (2017)
2. Blind Defence (2018)
3. Forced Confessions (2020)
4. Fatal Proof (2023)

== Interviews ==
- Book Browse Interview
