= Half Broken Things =

2003 novel by Morag Joss

- First edition
- Author: Morag Joss
- Language: English
- Genre: Crime/Mystery novel
- Publisher: Hodder & Stoughton
- Publication date: 2003
- Publication place: United Kingdom
- Media type: Print (hardback and paperback)
- Pages: 320 pp
- ISBN: 0-340-82049-7 (UK)
- OCLC: 53821729

Half Broken Things is a 2003 psychological thriller novel by Scottish writer Morag Joss. It won the CWA Silver Dagger in 2003.

== Plot ==
The lives of three very lonely people—pregnant Steph, on the run from her violent boyfriend; Michael, a petty thief who becomes her knight in shining armour; and Jean, a sixty-year-old spinster nearing the end of her career as a house sitter—collide dramatically within the grounds of the illustrious Walden Manor, where together they seal themselves away from the outside world and build a new life together. The fantasy cannot last forever though, and events take a murderous turn when the first unexpected guest arrives.

== Reception ==
Half Broken Things received starred reviews from Booklist and Publishers Weekly, who said it is a " brilliantly conceived, finely executed novel".

Kirkus Reviews called the novel "a grim, courageous work that crosses into dark, interior regions American readers rarely dare to tread".

== Film adaptation ==
Half Broken Things was adapted for television in 2007, starring Penelope Wilton, Daniel Mays, Nicholas Le Prevost and Sinead Matthews. The two-hour drama, directed by Tim Fywell and produced by Festival Film & TV, aired on ITV on 28 October 2007.

=== Filming locations ===
The entire 2007 television production was filmed in Kent, with Boughton Monchelsea Place being the main location, which doubled as Walden Manor. Herne Bay featured briefly at the start of the film as the location where Jean (Wilton) is staying before being handed her final house sitting job. Teston Bridge Country Park also featured briefly in the film as the rural location where Michael (Mays) changes out of disguise and back into his clothes, and the village of Teston was the setting of the local village, where the post office doubled as Haleton Village Shop.
