= Good Girl, Bad Girl =

2019 novel by Australian author Michael Robotham

- Author: Michael Robotham
- Language: English
- Genre: Thriller
- Publisher: Hachette Australia
- Publication date: 23 July 2019
- Publication place: Australia
- Media type: Print
- Pages: 416 pp.
- Awards: 2020 Crime Writers' Association Gold Dagger award, winner
- ISBN: 9780733638053

Good Girl, Bad Girl is a 2019 novel by the Australian author Michael Robotham.

It is the first novel in the author's series featuring lead character Cyrus Haven.

It was the winner of the 2020 Crime Writers' Association Gold Dagger award.

== Synopsis ==
A young girl is found in an abandoned house. She won't tell anyone her name, age or anything about herself. Six years later she meets forensic psychologist Cyrus Haven who discovers that the young girl, now called Evie Cormac, has the ability to determine if someone is lying.

== Critical reception ==
A Kirkus Review writer noted that "Robotham is a master plotter at the top of his form, and readers will surely hope to see more of his complicated new characters."

The judges of the CWA Gold Dagger Award concurred: "Robotham is an absolute master of the impactful opening and draws you effortlessly in before seamlessly ratcheting up the tension and jeopardy."

== Awards ==
- 2020 Crime Writers' Association Gold Dagger award, winner
- 2020 Australian Book Industry Awards General Fiction, shortlisted
- 2020 Edgar Allan Poe Award for Best Novel, shortlisted

== Publication history ==
After the novel's initial publication in 2019 in Australia by Hachette, it was reprinted as follows:

- Scribner, USA, 2019
- Sphere Books, UK 2019

It was also translated into German in 2019, Croatian in 2022, Korean in 2023, Ukrainian and Polish in 2024.

== See also ==
- 2019 in Australian literature
