= Laura Wilson (writer) =

English crime writer

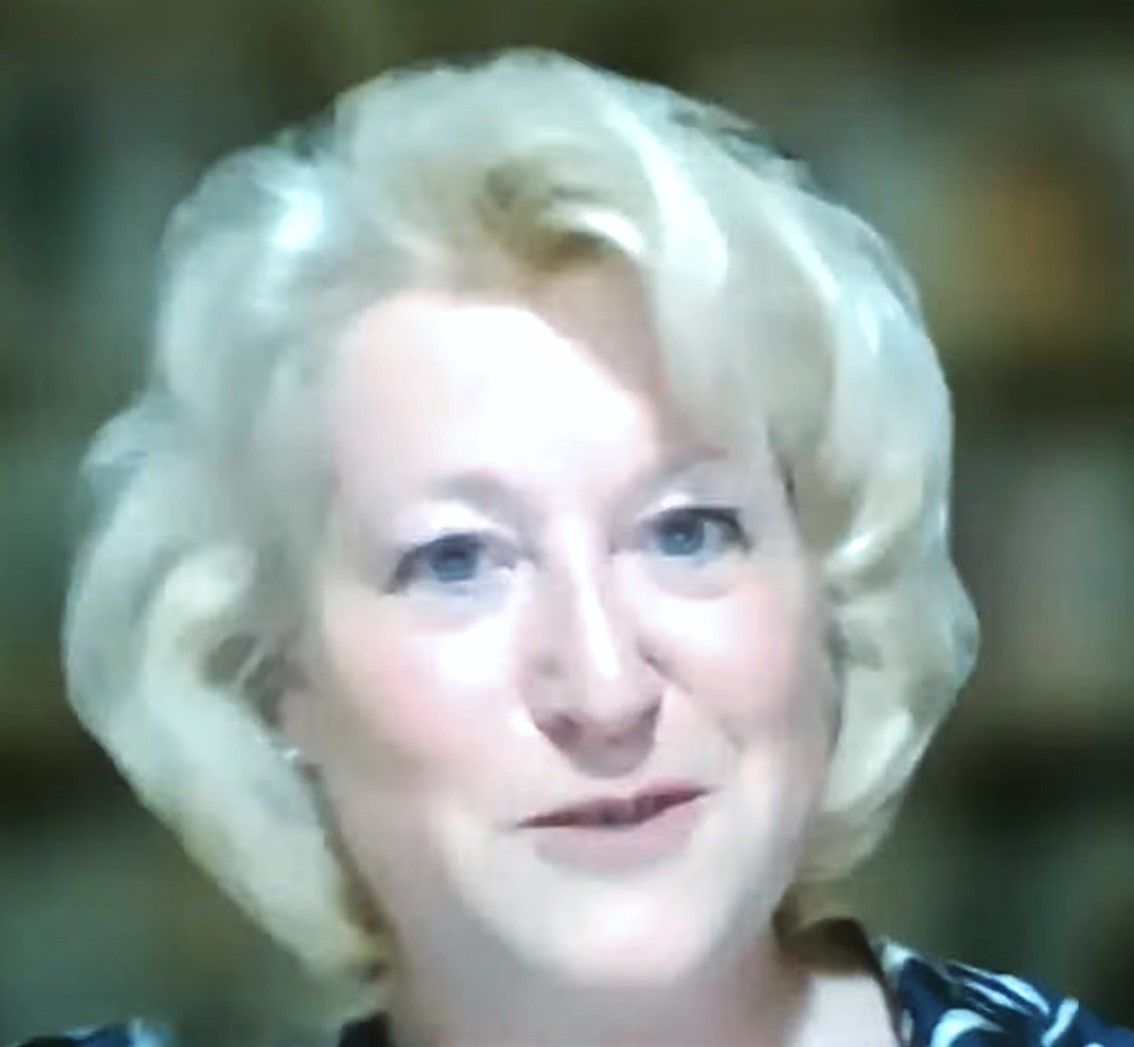
- Wilson speaks to the British Library in 2022
- Born: 1964 (age 61–62)
- Education: Somerville College, Oxford
- Occupation: Novelist
- Writing career
- Language: English
- Genre: Crime fiction
- Notable works: The Lover; Stratton’s War
- Notable awards: Prix du Polar Européen; Ellis Peters Award
- Website: www.laura-wilson.co.uk

Laura Wilson (born 1964) is an English crime writer based in London, where she was born and raised. She has degrees in English Literature from Somerville College, Oxford, and University College London, and has worked as a teacher and editor of non-fiction. Many of her novels have either a historical setting or a distinct historical connection, and often have split or dual narratives.

Her fifth novel, The Lover, won the Prix du Polar Européen in 2005, and her eighth, Stratton’s War, won the Crime Writers' Association's 2008 Ellis Peters Award for Best Historical Mystery. Both The Lover and A Thousand Lies were shortlisted for the Crime Writers' Association's Gold Dagger, and A Little Death, The Lover and An Empty Death were shortlisted for the Ellis Peters Award. She is The Guardian's crime fiction reviewer and was the 2009 programming chair of the Harrogate Crime Writing Festival. She also writes novels for young adults as Jamie Costello.

== Bibliography ==
- A Little Death (Orion, 1999)
- Dying Voices (Orion, 2000)
- My Best Friend (Orion, 2001)
- Hello Bunny Alice (Orion, 2003) US title: Telling Lies to Alice
- The Lover (Orion, 2004)
- A Thousand Lies (Orion, 2006)
- Stratton’s War (Orion, 2007) US title: The Innocent Spy
- An Empty Death (Orion, 2009)
- A Capital Crime (Quercus, 2010)
- A Willing Victim (Quercus, 2012)
- The Riot (Quercus, 2013)
- The Wrong Girl (Quercus, 2015)
- The Other Woman (Quercus, 2017)

As Jamie Costello

- Monochrome (Atom, 2022)
- The Midnight Clock (Atom, 2024)
