= Shatter (novel) =

2008 psychological thriller novel by Michael Robotham

- First edition
- Author: Michael Robotham
- Language: English
- Genre: Novel
- Publisher: Sphere Books, London
- Publication date: 2008
- Publication place: Australia
- Media type: Print Hardback & Paperback
- Pages: 466 pp
- ISBN: 978-1-84744-177-5 (first edition, hardback)
- OCLC: 176833215
- Preceded by: The Night Ferry
- Followed by: Bombproof

Shatter is a 2008 psychological thriller novel written by the Australian author Michael Robotham.

== Plot outline ==
Professor Joseph O'Loughlin (referred to as Joe throughout the novel) is tasked by the police with stopping a woman, Christine Wheeler, from committing suicide, only to fail. When Wheeler's teenage daughter appears onto his doorstep, she insists that her mother would not have jumped off a bridge as she did, for she was not suicidal and had a fear of heights. Haunted by his failure to save her and driven by a need to understand what caused her death, Joe searches for the truth, only to be caught up in a string of murders all while dealing with his own problems with Parkinson's disease and his marriage.

== Awards ==
- Ned Kelly Awards for Crime Writing, Best Novel, 2008: winner
- Crime Writers' Association (UK), The CWA Ian Fleming Steel Dagger, Best Thriller, 2008: shortlisted

== Reviews ==
Sue Turnbull, in The Age, was impressed with the novel: "Thematically complex, artfully structured, beautifully written and observed, Shatter confirms Robotham's place in the front row of crime."

Reviewing the book in Dark Scribe magazine, Rick R. Reed compared the villain to Thomas Harris's Hannibal Lecter and went on: "Shatter really has it all when it comes to the thriller genre: it’s fast-paced, has uniquely and wonderfully-drawn characters, contains a great mystery at its center, and makes you want to read more from Michael Robotham."
