= Rx Murder =

1958 American film directed by Derek Twist

- Theatrical release poster
- Directed by: Derek Twist
- Screenplay by: John W. Gossage; Derek Twist
- Based on: The Deeds of Dr. Deadcert by Joan Fleming
- Produced by: John W. Gossage
- Starring: Rick Jason; Lisa Gastoni; Marius Goring; Sandu Scott; Mary Merrall; Vida Hope
- Cinematography: Arthur Grant
- Edited by: Desmond Saunders
- Music by: John Wooldridge
- Production company: Templar Film Studios
- Distributed by: 20th Century Fox
- Release dates: February 18, 1958 (United Kingdom); July 23, 1958 (United States)
- Running time: 85 minutes
- Countries: United States; United Kingdom
- Language: English

Rx Murder (also marketed as Rx for Murder and Prescription for Murder) is a 1958 American crime film directed by Derek Twist and written by John W. Gossage and Derek Twist. It is based on the 1955 novel The Deeds of Dr. Deadcert by Joan Fleming. The film stars Rick Jason, Lisa Gastoni, Marius Goring, Sandu Scott, Mary Merrall and Vida Hope. It was released on February 18, 1958, by 20th Century Fox.

== Cast ==
- Rick Jason as Jethro Jones
- Lisa Gastoni as Kitty Mortlock
- Marius Goring as Doctor Henry Dysert
- Sandu Scott as Stella Dysert
- Mary Merrall as Miss Bettyhill
- Vida Hope as Louise
- Helen Shingler as Charlotte
- Phyllis Neilson-Terry as Lady Lacy
- Nicholas Hannen as Colonel
- Kynaston Reeves as Mr. Sparrow
- Avice Landone as Mrs. Motlock
- Frederick Leister as Dr. Alexander
- Patrick Waddington as Sir George Watson
- Totti Truman Taylor as Mrs. Davies
- Noel Hood as Lady Watson
