= Derek B. Miller =

American novelist and international affairs specialist

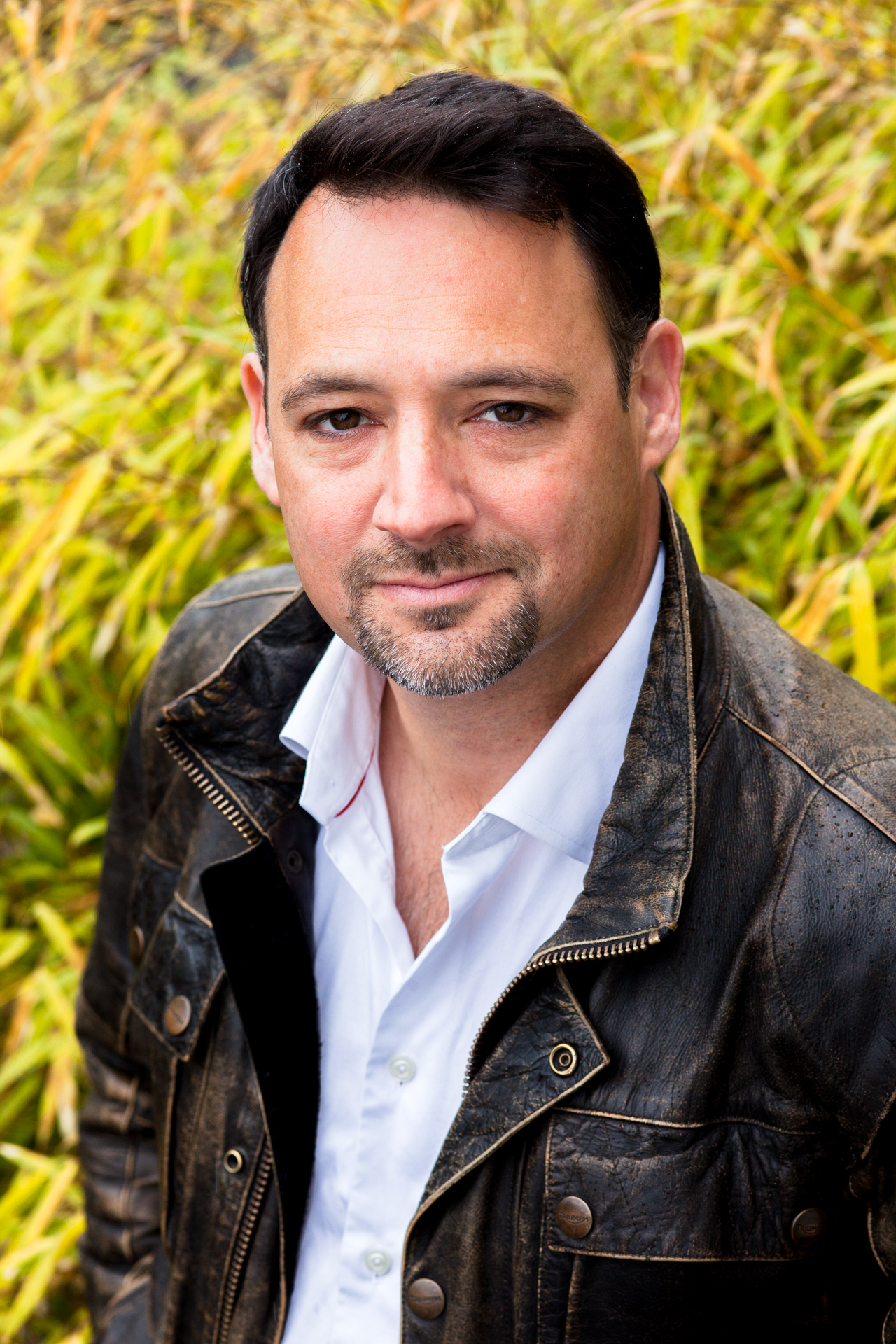

Derek B. Miller is an American novelist and international affairs specialist.

== Early life and education ==
Miller was born in Boston, Massachusetts, and grew up in Wellesley. Miller's family emigrated from Eastern Europe to Massachusetts in the late 1800s and early 1900s from the Jewish Pale of Settlement. He has two children.

Miller is a graduate of Wellesley High School (1988), Sarah Lawrence College (B.A. in Liberal Arts, 1992), Georgetown University (M.A. in national security studies from the Edmund A. Walsh School of Foreign Service, 1996), The Graduate Institute of International and Development Studies of Geneva, Switzerland (D.E.S in international relations, 1998, and Ph.D. 2004) where he graduated with the highest distinction of summa cum laude. He attended St. Catherine's College at the University of Oxford (1995-1996) and later Linacre College (1999-2000) on scholarship from the Europaeum Consortium, also at Oxford.

He later published Media Pressure on Foreign Policy: The Evolving Theoretical Framework with Palgrave based on his dissertation "Bad Press." The study offered a theory of media pressure - what it is, how it works, how it can be measured - based in part on 'positioning theory' in discursive psychology. Professor Rom Harré (former head of Philosophy at Oxford) wrote: 'This fascinating book opens up quite new directions in the study of key political processes. Focusing on the alleged influence that the media are supposed to exercise on the political process, Derek Miller brings two novel sets of considerations to bear. Turning to the history of discussions of media influence he brings to light the profundity of discussions of this very issue in the period during which the Western democratic tradition was being forged. Perhaps more importantly he asks the fundamental question: how could the media influence the political process? To answer this question he makes use of one of the most recent developments in social psychology, positioning theory. This is an original and powerful study, and deserves to be very widely read.'

== International affairs ==
Miller has worked in international affairs since 1994, starting his career as an intern on Capitol Hill for then-Senator William S. Cohen (R - Maine). He was the founding editor of Georgetown's National Security Studies Quarterly and has held positions with, or consulted for, many think tanks and organizations including The Mission of the Republic of Korea to the United Nations at Geneva; The Small Arms Survey; International Alert; the United Nations Development Programme; and The United Nations Institute for Disarmament Research among others. Miller founded The Policy Lab® in 2011 where he is Director. Additionally, he is (since 2015) Adjunct Senior Fellow at the Pell Center for International Relations and Public Policy, Salve Regina University, and Research Associate at the Centre on Conflict, Development, and Peacebuilding at the Graduate Institute Geneva. In 2018, Miller helped found and launch Voices Between: Stories Against Extremism, an initiative by storytellers to innovate learning about war and peace.

== Novels ==
In January 2013 The Times newspaper said Miller's debut novel Norwegian by Night was one to look out for in the forthcoming year, and The Economist also praised the book.

Norwegian by Night — written in English — was first published in Norway in translation by Cappelen Damm (2010) as Et merkelig sted å dø. The novel's first English-language publisher was Scribe in Australia (2013), followed by Faber & Faber in the UK, and Houghton Mifflin Harcourt in the U.S. It was later published in many other countries.

Norwegian by Night received many favorable reviews. It was shortlisted for seven literary awards winning the Crime Writers' Association's John Creasy Dagger Award for a debut crime novel. It was also awarded the eDunnit Award and the Goldsboro Last Laugh Award and was nominated for the Strand Magazine Critic's Award for Best First Novel, the American Bookseller's Association's 2014 Indie Choice Award, Barry Award for Best First Novel, and the Macavity Award for Best First Mystery. Pulitzer Prize winner Richard Russo wrote that it was "one of those books that completely transcends its genre and offers us one of the most memorable characters — Sheldon Horowitz — that I’ve encountered in years."

Miller's second novel, The Girl in Green (2016), was also published by Faber & Faber. In the UK it was short-listed for the 2017 Crime Writers' Association's Gold Dagger for the "best crime novel of the year" with the judges writing that "after his award-winning debut, Norwegian by Night, Derek B. Miller has delivered a blistering and powerful successor in The Girl in Green, set against the backdrop of war-torn Iraq. This is a thought-provoking tour de force with unforgettable characters – one not to be missed." It was a Shelf Awareness Best Book of 2017. In 2019, Karl Marlantes (winner of the Navy Cross and author of Matterhorn: A Novel of the Vietnam War), wrote for The Wall Street Journal that The Girl in Green "is page-turning adventure and humor overlaid on bungling bureaucracy and the sorrows of war. It’s up there with Catch-22 … [and] In Arwood Hobbes, Mr. Miller beautifully captures the sardonic language of the American grunt. The novel is a superb example of Wavy Gravy’s comment in the aftermath of a disaster, that, 'Without a sense of humor, it just isn’t funny.'"

Miller's third novel, American by Day (2018), was published by Transworld at Penguin Random House. Like The Girl in Green, it was also short-listed for the Crime Writers' Association's Gold Dagger (2019). Richard Russo, on reading American by Day, wrote, "Sure Derek Miller's novels are smart and full of heart and savvy and hilarious, but even more than all of this, he's fun. He's as dedicated as any writer I know to the proposition that readers should enjoy themselves, should delight in the experience of life and language. If our hearts get broken along the way, so much the better." Val McDermid picked American by Day for her Best Crime Fiction of 2019 for Five Books, writing, "American by Day is engagingly written. Miller isn’t afraid to write characters who are opinionated. They don’t hold their tongue about what they believe in, they let rip. People are angry, people are passionate. I love the unorthodoxy of it, I suppose. It’s not what you expect it to be."

Miller's fourth novel, Radio Life (2021), is his debut into science fiction, published by Jo Fletcher Books (UK). "In this riveting political thriller, The Commonwealth, a post-apocalyptic civilisation on the rise, is locked in a clash of ideas with the Keepers, a fight which threatens to destroy the world . . . again." Novelist Chris Brookmyre wrote, "It’s one of the most captivating epics I’ve read in ages, evoking a convincing sense of fragile social structure reminiscent of China Miéville at his best, in combination with a philosophical underpinning that lends real weight to the stakes. It reads like Mad Max as imagined by Neal Stephenson. It’s luxuriantly immersive, truly transporting in a way that is invaluable during these trying times." It was picked for best new science fiction by the Financial Times and The Guardian, and Best New Thriller by The Sunday Times.

Miller's fifth novel, How to Find Your Way in the Dark (2021) is the long-anticipated prequel to Norwegian by Night. Again by Houghton Mifflin Harcourt, it is described as, "A coming-of-age story set during the rising tide of World War II, How to Find Your Way in the Dark follows Sheldon Horowitz from his humble start in a cabin in the Berkshires of Massachusetts, through the trauma of his father’s murder and the murky experience of assimilation in Hartford, Connecticut, to the birth of stand-up comedy in the Catskills — all while he and his friends are beset by anti-Semitic neighbors, employers, and criminals." The New York Times gave it a glowing review, writing: ″I am convinced that Derek B. Miller’s How to Find Your Way in the Dark ... was expressly tailored to my tastes and that I am its ideal reader. I suspect others will feel the same way; it’s that kind of book … In less confident hands the many moving parts would collapse into a jumble. Miller, however, juggles each element effortlessly. His character portraits are indelible, often heartbreaking. At times this novel moved me to tears, the highest possible compliment.". The novel was selected by The New York Times as a Best Mystery Novel of the Year for 2021.

His sixth novel, Quiet Time (2021), was released as an Audible Original novel and narrated by the award-winning Bahni Turpin. Audible writes, "At its heart, Quiet Time is a story about growing pains - in adolescence and mid-life - and what it means to be a family in a world that feels both hyper-connected and relentlessly alienating. At turns comedic, suspenseful, and poignant, Derek B. Miller pairs his immersive, signature storytelling gifts with Bahni Turpin’s singular voice to bring this astounding Audible Original to life."

His seventh novel, The Curse of Pietro Houdini, (2024) was published by Avid Reader Press at Simon & Schuster in the U.S., by Transworld at Penguin Random House in the UK. It was also published by Koridor Yayıncılık in Turkey, translated by Şafak Tahmaz. It was short-listed for the Wilber Smith Award for Best Novel, and Tom Nolon of The Wall Street Journal called it "[An] urgent work that slyly honors authors both ancient and modern. . . Mr. Miller’s book has the ring of truth and the echo of myth, and it deserves all the lucky readers who discover it.”

== Bibliography ==
- Norwegian by Night (2010)
- The Girl in Green
- American by Day (2018)
- Radio Life (2021)
- How to Find Your Way in the Dark (2021)
- Quiet Time (2021)
- The Curse of Pietro Houdini (2024)
