= Laura Grimaldi =

Italian writer, journalist and translator

- Born: Laura Tanini; 1928 Rufina
- Died: 3 July 2012 (aged 83–84) Milan
- Occupation: writer; journalist; translator
- Children: Carlo Grimaldi, Gabriele Grimaldi
- Relatives: Oliver Grimaldi

Laura Grimaldi (1928 – 3 July 2012) was an Italian writer, journalist and translator from English.

== Life ==
Grimaldi was born in Rufina near Florence in 1928. Her family soon moved to Milan where she resided for most of her life. She has two sons, Carlo and Gabriele, and is also the grandmother of Oliver Grimaldi.

She became known for her translations of notable authors writing in English. The hundreds of books she translated included works by Ray Bradbury, Raymond Chandler, Agatha Christie, Philip K. Dick, Ernest Hemingway and Ellery Queen.

Grimaldi wrote crime novels and her publisher called her the "Queen of Crime" citing her work in the 1950s. Her novels include Suspicion. Her stories are set in Milan. She received the Prix du Polar Européen in 2003 by her work La Colpa. She was a director of the company Interno Giallo. In the year 2000, she was interviewed about her life and her work in the show 'La Signora in Nero (The Lady in Black)'

Grimaldi died in Milan in 2012.
