= Olivier Norek =

French writer

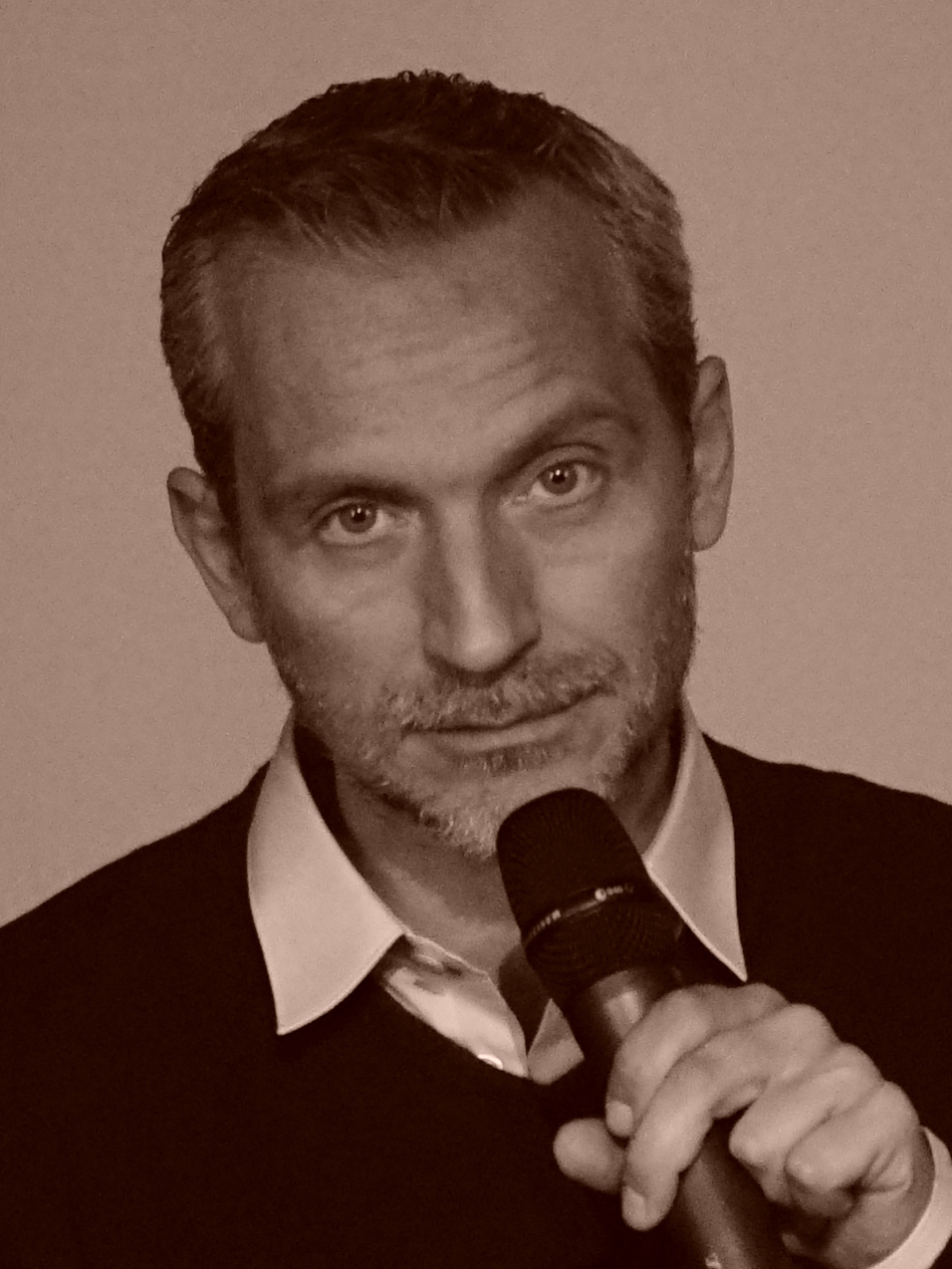
- Born: 2 August 1975 (age 51); Castelnau-Pégayrols
- Occupations: Writer, police officer, criminal investigator
- Writing career
- Language: French language
- Notable awards: Prix du Polar Européen, Prix Maison de la Presse, prix Le Mans-Antoine de Saint-Exupéry, Grand prix Jean Giono, Prix Renaudot des lycéens, Embouchure Prize, Grand prix des lectrices de Elle, catégorie policier, prix Sang d'encre des lycéens, prix Sang d'encre des lycéens, prix Gouttes de Sang d'encre, Michel-Lebrun prize, Knight of the Order of the Lion of Finland, Chevalier des Arts et des Lettres,,

Olivier Norek is a French writer of crime fiction.

== Biography ==
He was born in Toulouse in 1975. He served as an aide worker in Guyana and the former Yugoslavia. He became a policeman, serving for 18 years and eventually rising to the rank of captain in the Seine-Saint-Denis district.

His crime novels have been bestsellers in France, and the first of his Banlieue trilogy, titled Code 93, has been translated into English by Nick Caistor and published by Maclehose Press under the title The Lost and the Damned. The series features the fictional police detective Captain Coste.
