= Guns of Darkness =

1962 British film by Anthony Asquith

- Directed by: Anthony Asquith
- Written by: John Mortimer (film)
- Based on: Act of Mercy (1960 novel) by Francis Clifford
- Produced by: Thomas Clyde
- Starring: David Niven; Leslie Caron; James Robertson Justice; David Opatoshu
- Cinematography: Robert Krasker
- Edited by: Frederick Wilson
- Music by: Benjamin Frankel
- Production companies: Associated British Pictures Corporation; Cavalcade Films
- Distributed by: Warner-Pathé Distributors
- Release dates: 19 July 1962; 17 August 1962 (US)
- Running time: 102 minutes
- Country: United Kingdom
- Language: English

Guns of Darkness is a 1962 British drama film directed by Anthony Asquith and starring David Niven, Leslie Caron and James Robertson Justice. It was written by John Mortimer based on the 1960 novel Act of Mercy by Francis Clifford, which was retitled Guns of Darkness for the American market.

== Plot summary ==
Caught in a South American country during a coup, a British couple, Tom and Claire, try to help the ousted Latin American president of Tribulacion, named Rivera, escape to the border.

== Cast ==
- Leslie Caron as Claire Jordan
- David Niven as Tom Jordan
- James Robertson Justice as Hugo Bryant
- David Opatoshu as President Rivera
- Derek Godfrey as Hernandez
- Ian Hunter as Dr. Swann
- Richard Pearson as Bastian
- Eleanor Summerfield as Mrs. Bastian
- Sandor Elès as Lieutenant Gomez

== Reception ==
The Monthly Film Bulletin wrote: "Submerged among the intrigues, chases and shootings of a typical Latin American adventure yarn, are fragments of a serious comment on the degrading effects of violence on those who use it, and on the moral duty to aid anyone in danger. But neither John Mortimer's script nor Anthony Asquith's direction gives the moral the significance it demands. David Niven fails to put himself across as the immature idealist he is supposed to be playing; Leslie Caron, as his wife, overacts painfully in their intimate scenes; and Derek Godfrey's revolutionary is a stock sinister type with a Castro beard. Only a suspenseful struggle for life in a swamp comes over as a worthwhile moment of cinema."

Kine Weekly wrote: The picture, basically a profile of an Englishman who has education and moral courage, but very fixed horizons, gets to the heart of its matter through touching and gripping channels. David Niven acts convincingly as Tom, who rushes in where angels fear to road, Leslie Caron, piquant and appealing, easily rises above one incongruous romantic interlude as Claire, David Opatashu registers as the idealist Rivera, Barry Shawzin scores in contrast as the stop-at-nothing Zoreno, and James Robertson Justice is very true to type as the shallow, face-saving Bryant."
