= Janet Cohen, Baroness Cohen of Pimlico =

British lawyer (born 1940)

The Right Honourable The Baroness Cohen of Pimlico
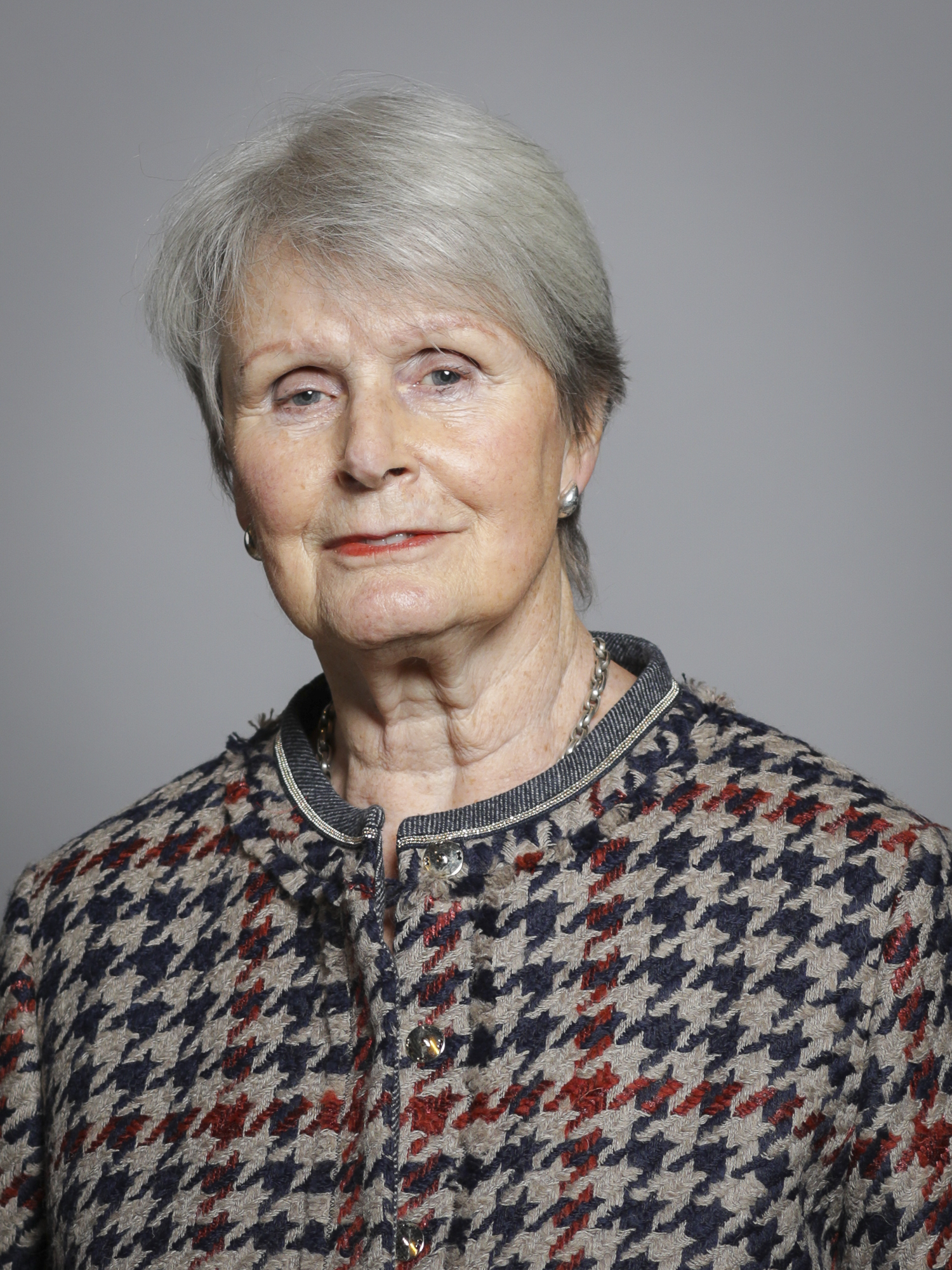
- Official portrait of Baroness Cohen of Pimlico

Member of the House of Lords
- Lord Temporal
- Life peerage 3 May 2000 – 19 December 2024

Personal details
- Born: Janet Neel; 4 July 1940 (age 86)
- Party: Labour
- Spouse: James Lionel Cohen (m. 1971)
- Children: 3
- Education: Newnham College, Cambridge (BA)

Janet Cohen, Baroness Cohen of Pimlico (née Neel; born 4 July 1940), also known as Janet Neel, is a British lawyer and crime fiction writer. She is the daughter of George Edric Neel and Mary Isabel Budge. She was educated at South Hampstead High School, Hampstead, London, England and graduated from Newnham College, Cambridge, in 1962 with a Bachelor of Arts (BA) degree in law.

She started to work as a practising solicitor in 1965. She married James Lionel Cohen on 18 December 1971. She was a governor of the BBC between 1994 and 1999. She was created a life peer as Baroness Cohen of Pimlico', of Pimlico in the City of Westminster, on 3 May 2000 and sits as a Labour peer in the House of Lords. She is an Honorary Fellow of St Edmund's College, Cambridge. Cohen retired from the House of Lords on 19 December 2024.

As "Janet Neel" and "Janet Cohen" she is the author of crime fiction novels.

== Early life and education ==
Cohen was born Janet Neel on 4 July 1940 to George Edric Neel and Mary Isabel Neel (née Budge). She was educated at South Hampstead High School in London, graduating in 1958, and attended Newnham College, Cambridge, gaining a Bachelor of Arts (BA) degree in law in 1962.

== Career ==
After working as an articled clerk from 1963, Cohen qualified as a solicitor in 1965. She worked as a consultant from 1965 until 1969, when she joined the Department of Trade and Industry as a civil servant. Cohen was a director of Charterhouse Bank from 1982 to 2000, and a director and subsequently vice chairman of Yorkshire Building Society from 1991 to 1999.

== Personal life ==
Janet Neel married James Lionel Cohen in 1971. They have two sons and a daughter.

== Bibliography ==
=== Francesca Wilson and John McLeish series ===
- Death's Bright Angel (1988)
- Death on Site (1989)
- Death of a Partner (1991), shortlisted for Gold Dagger Award
- Death Among the Dons (1993), shortlisted for Gold Dagger Award
- A Timely Death (1996)
- To Die For (1998)
- O Gentle Death (2000)

=== Other novels ===
- The Highest Bidder (1992); writing as Janet Cohen
- Children of a Harsh Winter (1995); writing as Janet Cohen
- Ticket to Ride (2005)
