= Quais du Polar =

Annual book fair

Coordinates: 45.7640°N 4.8363°E

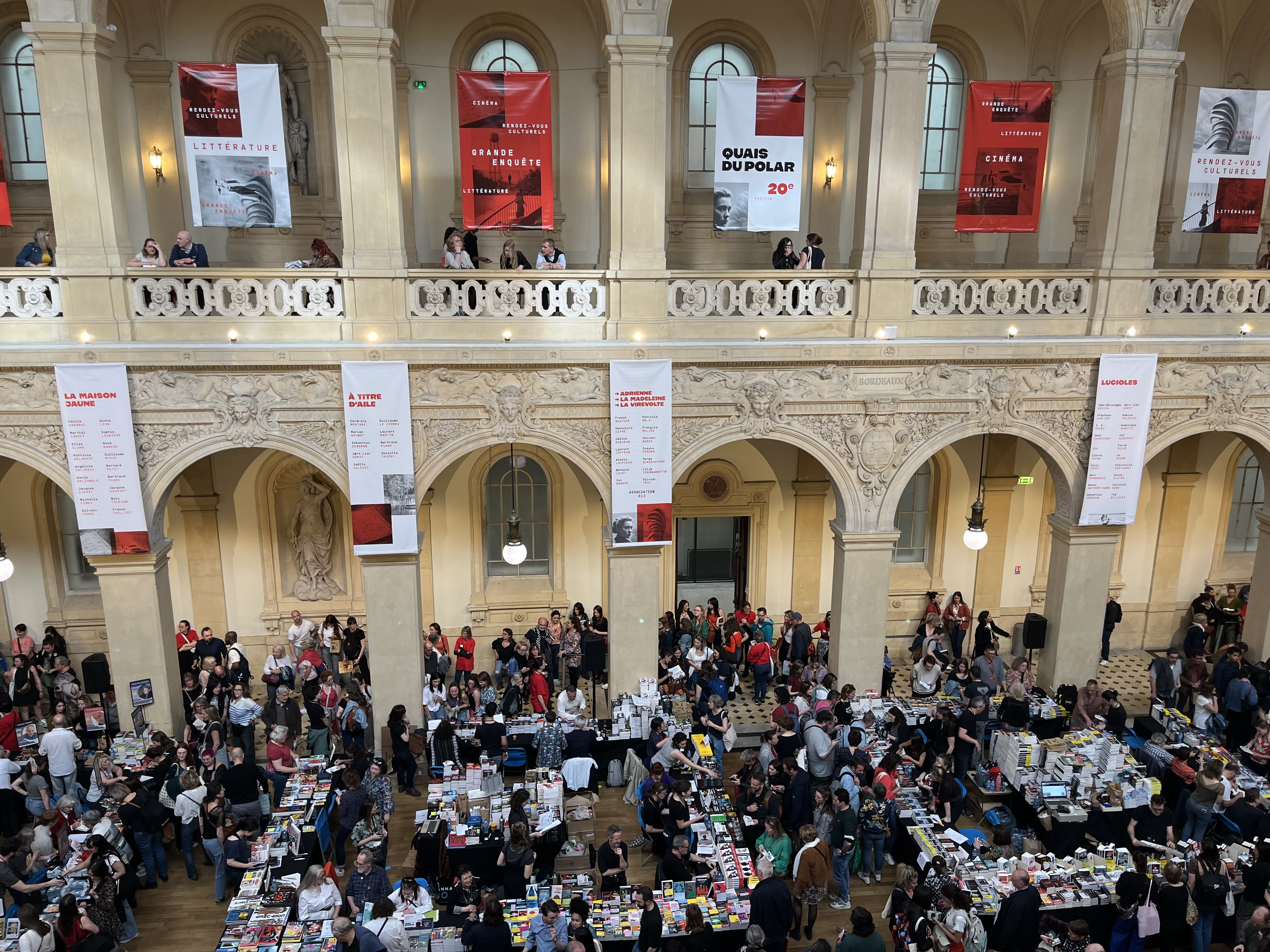
- Quais du Polar 2024 festival
- Status: Active
- Genre: Crime fiction
- Date: Early April
- Frequency: Annual
- Locations: Lyon, France
- Years active: 2005–present
- Website: www.quaisdupolar.com

The Festival international du polar de Lyon, or Quais du polar is a festival of crime fiction in print and film. It has been held annually in Lyon since 2005.

== History ==
The festival was launched in April 2005, when the newly created Association Quais du Polar invited Lyonnais to rediscover crime fiction in all its forms - novels, comics, cinema, theatre and a city‑wide investigation game - at venues "between Rhône and Saône".

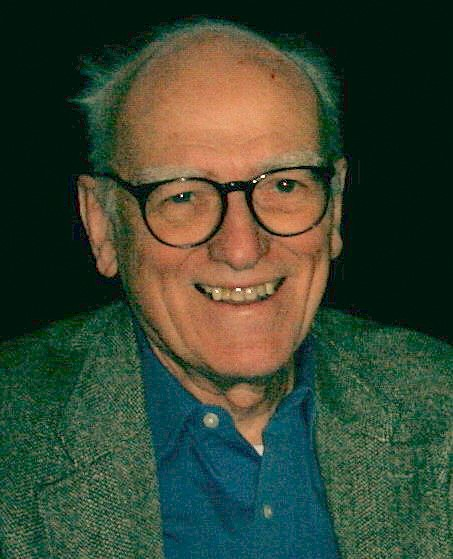
Donald Westlake, guest at the 2006 Quais du polar festival

Audience figures rose quickly: 45,000 visitors in 2012 prompted organisers to close the book fair temporarily for safety, nearly 80,000 in 2016 filled the Palais de la Bourse and neighbouring halls, and more than 100,000 by 2019, when 140 authors occupied fifty sites across the metropolitan area.

The COVID-19 pandemic forced a digital pivot: the entire 2020 programme (3–5 April) was streamed live, with virtual round‑tables and master‑classes. In 2021 the festival returned to the public realm but shifted to 2 - 4 July; re‑badged as an open‑air edition, its "Grande Librairie" moved to the Rhône quays, while debates, readings and river‑cruises took place on péniches and in outdoor theatres.

Marking its twentieth anniversary in 2024, Quais du Polar once again broke its attendance record with over 100,000 festival‑goers and 20,000 players in the signature city investigation.

== Prizes ==
The festival awards several prizes; the readers' prize, the comic thriller prize, the Prix du Polar Européen, a prize for the best new story and one for the best European short film.

== Programm ==
- A free book fair in the Palais de la Bourse, with parallel talks in the Hôtel de Ville, Opéra de Lyon, Théâtre des Célestins and other venues.
- The Grande Enquête, a large‑scale treasure hunt written each year by a crime author and played in the streets of Lyon.
- Film screenings, concerts, exhibitions, readings and a professional day branded "Polar Connection".
- A youth strand offering writing workshops, storytelling hours and a schools short‑story contest.

== See also ==
- Crime fiction
- List of literary festivals
