= Lost (Robotham novel) =

2005 novel by Michael Robotham

- First edition
- Author: Michael Robotham
- Language: English
- Genre: Novel
- Publisher: Time Warner Book Group, London
- Publication date: 2005
- Publication place: Australia
- Media type: Print Paperback
- Pages: 390
- ISBN: 0-316-72553-6
- OCLC: 57639518
- Preceded by: The Suspect
- Followed by: The Night Ferry

Lost, also known as The Drowning Man, is a 2005 Ned Kelly Award-winning novel by the Australian author Michael Robotham, and is the second of his novels to feature the protagonists Dr Joseph O'Loughlin and DI Vincent Ruiz.

== Plot summary ==
Detective Inspector Vincent Ruiz is fished out of the Thames with a bullet in his leg and, post-surgery, no memory of how he got there or what he was working on. With help from clinical psychologist Dr Joseph O'Loughlin Ruiz comes to realise he was investigating the disappearance of 8 year old Mickey Carlyle, a case closed 3 years previously.

== Awards ==
- Ned Kelly Awards for Crime Writing, Best Novel, 2005: winner

== Reviews ==
ABC Radio National's "Bookshow" put Robotham's fiction in perspective: "His books Lost, The Night Ferry and most recently Shatter, have reinforced his reputation as one of the best architects of the psychological thriller."

The Australian Crime Fiction Database stated that the author "delivers an outstanding thriller with complex characters, pressure coming from both within the police force and from a dangerous unknown assailant and a strong unexpected ending."
