= Eagle Trap =

1993 novel by Geoffrey Archer

- Author: Geoffrey Archer
- Language: English
- Genre: Thriller
- Publisher: Arrow
- Publication date: January 1, 1993
- Publication place: United Kingdom
- Media type: Print (hardback and paperback)
- Pages: 404

Eagle Trap is a novel by British writer Geoffrey Archer, published in 1993 by Bantam Press. The story concerns a Royal Marines officer tasked to stop a nuclear Terror attack.

== Plot ==
The plot of the book opens during a failed rescue raid by the British SBS unit in Beirut in 1992. A force from the unit, led by Captain Peter Brodrick of the Royal Marines, failed when they tried to rescue Richard Bicknell from the captivity of a Lebanese criminal organization, led by Abdul Habib. During an air strike that was carried out as a diversion for the operation, Bicknell and Habib's brother are killed. Seeking revenge, Habib obtains a nuclear weapons with the aim of blowing up the British Aircraft carrier "Eagle" because the Harrier Fighter planes that attacked Beirut took off from it. Captain Brodrick, an experienced officer who fought with the Marines in the Falklands War, is assigned to the aircraft carrier, as the new commander of the Royal Marine security unit in the task force against drug trafficking. He must stop Habib at all cost.
