= The Night Ferry =

Book by Michael Robotham

- Author: Michael Robotham
- Language: English
- Genre: Crime novel
- Publisher: Hachette, Australia
- Publication date: 2007
- Publication place: Australia
- Media type: Print (Paperback)
- Pages: 408
- ISBN: 978-1-847-44016-7
- Preceded by: Lost (AKA The Drowning Man)
- Followed by: Shatter

The Night Ferry is Michael Robotham's third novel. Like the previous two, it features ex-Detective Inspector Vincent Ruiz, only this time in a supporting role to the main character.

The book was shortlisted for the Ned Kelly and the UK Crime Writers Association Steel Dagger awards, both in 2007.

== Plot summary ==
DC Alisha Barba is recovering after breaking her back during a kidnap rescue operation with the Metropolitan Police in London 12 months earlier. One day, Alisha receives a message from an old school friend with whom she has lost touch after they fell out. On the night of their school reunion, Alisha meets Cate for the first time in years and Cate is showing off her baby bump. When a crazed driver mows Cate and her husband down an ambulance is called. The paramedics can do nothing for Cate's husband and emergency first aid on Cate reveals her baby bump to be false.

With Cate dead, Alisha must confront a deadly trafficking operation that stretches across Europe and into Asia. With former Detective Inspector Ruiz (her old boss) she embarks on the quest for truth and a promise she made to Cate to not let her baby be taken by someone else.
