= John Sherwood =

John Sherwood may refer to:

- John Sherwood (athlete) (1945–2025), British hurdler
- John Sherwood (author) (1913–2002), author of fiction
- John Sherwood (bishop) (died 1494), Bishop of Durham, diplomat
- John Sherwood (chemist) (1933–2020), British physical chemist
- John Sherwood, original artist on Les Pretend
- John Sherwood (1903–1959), American director of The Monolith Monsters
- John Sherwood-Kelly (1880–1931), South African recipient of the Victoria Cross
- John D. Sherwood (1818–1891), American author
- John Darrell Sherwood (born 1966), American author
- John Sherwood (1947–2025), co-founder of the SABSA Institute
