= Claire Askew =

Scottish poet and novelist

Claire Askew (born 10 March 1986) is a Scottish novelist and poet.

== Biography ==
Claire Askew was born on 10 March 1986. She attended the University of Edinburgh, completing her undergraduate degree, postgraduate degree, and her PhD, before taking on the role as Writer in Residence at the same institution. In 2017 her first two novels were bought by Hodder & Stoughton, with the first, All the Hidden Truths, being released in 2018. Her latest book, How to Burn a Woman, is a collection of poems featuring outcast women through history, including witches, a group with which Askew herself identifies.

In December 2025, Askew was a guest on the Off the Shelf podcast to discuss her winning the Lucy Cavendish Fiction Prize in 2016.

== Writing ==
The first book in her crime fiction series, which follows the work of DI Helen Birch, All the Hidden Truths, won the inaugural Bloody Scotland Scottish Crime Debut of the Year in 2019. In addition, the book was the winner of the 2016 Lucy Cavendish Fiction Prize, shortlisted for the Crime Writers' Association Gold Dagger and Debut Dagger awards, and longlisted for the 2014 Peggy Chapman-Andrews (Bridport) Novel Award. She has subsequently published What You Pay For and Cover Your Tracks with Hodder & Stoughton.

Askew has also published three collections of poetry, The Mermaid and the Sailors (Red Squirrel Press, 2011), which won the 2010 Virginia Warbey Poetry Prize, This Changes Things (Bloodaxe, 2016) and How to burn a Woman (Bloodaxe, 2021). This Changes Things was shortlisted for the Saltire First Book Award, the Seamus Heaney Centre Poetry Prize, and the Michael Murphy Memorial Award.

== Publications ==
=== Fiction ===
- All the Hidden Truths (2018), Hodder & Stoughton
- What You Pay For (2019), Hodder & Stoughton
- Cover Your Tracks (2020), Hodder & Stoughton

=== Poetry ===
- The Mermaid and the Sailors, Red Squirrel Press - 2011
- This Changes Things (2016), Bloodaxe
- How to Burn a Woman (2021), Bloodaxe

=== Non-fiction ===
- Novelista (2020), John Murray Press

== Awards ==
=== Fiction ===
Year	Nominee	Award	Category	Result	Ref
2014	All the Hidden Truths	Bridport Prize	Peggy Chapman-Andrews First Novel Award	Longlisted	
2016	All the Hidden Truths	Lucy Cavendish Fiction Prize	—	Winner	
2019	All the Hidden Truths	Bloody Scotland	Scottish Crime Debut of the Year	Winner	
2019	All the Hidden Truths	Crime Writers' Association	Gold Dagger	Shortlisted	
2019	All the Hidden Truths	Crime Writers' Association	John Creasy Debut Dagger	Shortlisted	
2020	What You Pay For	Crime Writers' Association	Gold Dagger	Shortlisted	

=== Poetry ===
Winner

- Virginia Warbey Poetry Prize - 2010.
- International Salt Prize for Poetry - 2012.

Shortlisted

- Edwin Morgan Poetry Award - 2014 and 2016.

This Changes Things

Shortlisted

- Saltire First Book Award -
- The Seamus Heaney Centre Poetry Prize.
- The Michael Murphy Memorial Award.
