= The Long Echo =

1957 novel

- 1959 paperback edition
- Author: Douglas Rutherford
- Language: English
- Genre: Crime
- Publisher: Collins Crime Club
- Publication date: 1957
- Publication place: United Kingdom
- Media type: Print

The Long Echo is a 1957 crime novel by the Irish-British writer Douglas Rutherford. It was published in London by the Collins Crime Club. The book was nominated for the Crime Writers' Association's Gold Dagger for best crime novel of the year, losing out to The Colour of Murder by Julian Symons.

== Bibliography ==
- Reilly, John M. Twentieth Century Crime & Mystery Writers. Springer, 2015.
