= Emma Lathen =

American novelist

Emma Lathen is the pen name of two American businesswomen: economic analyst Mary Jane Latsis (July 12, 1927 – October 29, 1997) and attorney Martha Henissart (1929 - August 1, 2024). The pseudonym is constructed from two authors' names: "M" of Mary and "Ma" of Martha, plus "Lat" of Latsis and "Hen" of Henissart.

Henissart and Latsis met as graduate students at Harvard, where Henissart studied law and Latsis studied economics and public administration. Latsis grew up in Chicago and graduated from Wellesley College. Henissart received her B.A. in physics from Mount Holyoke College in 1950. Latsis worked for the CIA and the United Nations Food and Agricultural Organization and taught economics at her alma mater, Wellesley College. Henissart practiced law in New York and then returned to the Boston area to become the chief legal counsel for Raytheon. When they began writing mysteries in the early 1960s they decided to use a pseudonym and maintain the secret of their identities to avoid any conflict with employers and clients. Their identities as co-authors of the popular Lathen books remained a secret until 1977.

As Lathen, they wrote 24 mystery novels starring John Putnam Thatcher, a Wall Street banker. According to Latsis, "We decided on a banker because there is nothing on God's earth a banker can't get into." They also wrote under the pseudonym R. B. Dominic; the 7 Dominic stories feature Congressman Benton Safford as the sleuth. Each book features events in a specific industry or activity with which Thatcher or Safford become involved in the course of their work. The books often refer to specific public events in their plotting; for example, When in Greece is mostly set in that country during the Colonels' Revolution, and Going for the Gold involves the 1980 Winter Olympics at Lake Placid. Others relate to more general social and other trends, such as Death Shall Overcome which links with the Civil Rights Movement.

For each book they determined the basic structure and major characters, then wrote alternate chapters, with Latsis writing the first chapter, and Henissart the last. They would then do a joint rewrite to eliminate inconsistencies or conflicts.

At the time of Latsis' death in 1997, the duo were eighty percent through a new book using the setting of the 1991 Persian Gulf War, but Henissart elected not to finish it.

== Characterization ==
Their recurring characters are especially engaging. The books' supporting casts were written with "humor and authenticity."

John Putnam Thatcher is senior vice president of the Sloan Guaranty Trust, the "third largest bank in the world" (at least until East is East), a "youthful sixty" in Accounting for Murder and unaging in subsequent novels. His unsentimental view of the world allows him to apply his banker's knowledge to the crimes that pop up. His nominal superior is the bank's president, Bradford Withers (married to Carrie), a socialite and dunderhead; the Chairman of the Board George Lancer has more depth, but fewer amusing scenes, serving more as a foil for his wife Lucy. Thatcher's secretary is the redoubtable Rose Theresa Corsa, who fends off interruptions from the bank officers who report to Thatcher and generally runs his working hours (and much of the rest of his life) while regarding his involvement in detective work with disapproval. His subordinates include Charlie Trinkham (raffish), Everett Gabler (severe), and Walter Bowman (corpulent and curious). The very junior trust officer Kenneth Nicolls often appears, perhaps because the first Emma Lathen novel detailed how he met his wife Jane, while subsequent books mention details of his life such as purchase of his first home, birth of a son and a daughter, and first international business trip.

== Critical reception ==
Lathen's books were consistently well received. "The authors have a distinctive talent for writing clearly and entertainingly about complicated financial intrigues, for combining these business matters with current events, and for creating tightly plotted mysteries that produce fascinating and civilized novels." Author and critic Anthony Boucher praised Lathen's "extraordinary ability to clarify the most intricate financial shenanigans so that even I can understand them". The London Times described Lathen as "a sort of Jane Austen of the detective novel, crisp, detached, mocking, economical".

== Awards ==
- 1967: Gold Dagger Award for Murder Against the Grain
- 1983: Edgar Award, Ellery Queen Award
- 1997: Agatha Award, Malice Domestic Award for Lifetime Achievement

== Bibliography ==
=== as Emma Lathen ===
- Banking on Death (1961)
- A Place for Murder (1963)
- Accounting for Murder (1964); Silver Dagger Award
- Murder Makes the Wheels Go Round (1966)
- Death Shall Overcome (1966)
- Murder Against the Grain (1967); Gold Dagger Award
- A Stitch in Time (1968)
- Come to Dust (1968)
- When in Greece (1969); shortlisted for Edgar Award
- Murder to Go (1969)
- Pick Up Sticks (1970)
- Ashes to Ashes (1971)
- The Longer the Thread (1971)
- Murder Without Icing (1972)
- Sweet and Low (1974)
- By Hook or by Crook (1975)
- Double, Double, Oil and Trouble (1978)
- Going for Gold (1981)
- Green Grow the Dollars (1982)
- Something in the Air (1988)
- East is East (1991)
- Right on the Money (1993)
- Brewing Up a Storm (1996)
- A Shark Out of Water (1997)

=== as R. B. Dominic ===
- Murder, Sunny Side Up (1968)
- Murder in High Place (1969)
- There Is No Justice (aka Murder out of Court) (1971)
- Epitaph for a Lobbyist (1974)
- Murder Out of Commission (1976)
- The Attending Physician (1980)
- Unexpected Developments (aka A Flaw in the System) (1983)
