= A Thousand Lies =

2006 novel by Laura Wilson

- First edition
- Author: Laura Wilson
- Language: English
- Genre: Crime novel
- Publisher: Orion
- Publication date: 16 February 2006
- Publication place: United Kingdom
- Media type: Print (Hardcover, Paperback)
- Pages: 304 pp
- ISBN: 0-7528-5982-X
- OCLC: 62344125
- Dewey Decimal: 823/.914 22
- LC Class: PR6073.I4716 T48 2006

A Thousand Lies is a 2006 novel by British crime writer Laura Wilson. It was shortlisted for the Duncan Lawrie Dagger award.
