= Morag Joss =

British author

Morag Joss is a British writer. She became an author in 1996 after an early career in arts and museum management.

== Life and career ==
Joss was born in England in 1955 and from the age of four, grew up in Ayrshire, Scotland.

She is the author of eight novels, including the Sara Selkirk series, and Half Broken Things, which won the Crime Writers' Association's (CWA) Silver Dagger. She began writing in 1996 after a short story of hers was runner-up in a national competition sponsored by Good Housekeeping magazine. A visit to the Roman Baths with crime writer P. D. James germinated the plot of her first novel, Funeral Music (1998), the first in the Sara Selkirk series. It was nominated for a Dilys Award for the year's best mystery published in the USA.

Her later novels have moved increasingly towards literary fiction. In 2008 she was a Heinrich Böll writer-in-residence on Achill Island, County Mayo, Ireland.

Half Broken Things was adapted as a television film in 2007, starring Penelope Wilton.

In 2009 her sixth novel, The Night Following (2008), was nominated for the Edgar Allan Poe Award for Best Novel.

== Bibliography ==
=== Sara Selkirk novels ===
1. Funeral Music (1998)
2. Fearful Symmetry (1999)
3. Fruitful Bodies (2001)

=== Other novels ===
1. Half Broken Things (2003)
2. Puccini's Ghosts (2005)
3. The Night Following (2008)
4. Across the Bridge (2011) (U.S. title, Among the Missing)
5. Our Picnics in the Sun (2013)
6. Good to Go (announced as being written)
