= Kramer and Zondi =

Tromp Kramer & Mickey Zondi
- First appearance: The Steam Pig
- Last appearance: The Song Dog
- Created by: James H. McClure

In-universe information
- Gender: Male
- Occupation: Police officers
- Nationality: South African

The Kramer and Zondi novels are a series of Police procedurals by James H. McClure set in apartheid era South Africa.

== Overview ==
The action largely takes place in the fictional city of Trekkersberg. As a whole they form a subtle but damning critique of apartheid and everyday life in Natal during the years of National Party rule, with mention of pass laws, resettlement, the brutal treatment of Bantu prisoners and domestic help, the Security Branch, capital punishment, everyday and institutional racism, Afrikaner nationalism, racial classification (especially in The Steam Pig), the Immorality Act, banned books, mission schooling, conditions in the townships, necklacing, and the arrest of Nelson Mandela.

Tromp Kramer is an outwardly conventional Afrikaner from the "one-horse dorp" of Bethlehem, Free State. When in conversation with a conservative colleague like Dr Strydom, the pathologist, he adopts the racial prejudices expected of him. In the field, however, he relies heavily on the incisive deductions and translations of his Zulu assistant, Mickey Zondi, who is also able to pick up valuable information from both house staff (often maids) and the streets. The last novel in the series, The Song Dog, published in 1991 but set in 1962, retroactively tells the story of their first case together.

The books contrast the domestic and cultural differences between the two men (Zondi a dedicated family man, Kramer a lodger with his meager possessions stored in cardboard boxes and in an occasionally fraught relationship with the Widow Fourie, whom he first meets in The Song Dog) while at the same time foregrounding their mutual sympathy and respect for each other's abilities. In private they joke, chain smoke, and finish each other's thoughts, while maintaining the public front of Zondi as "kaffir" or "boy." In The Artful Egg Kramer calculates the number of times each has saved the life of the other to be 15.

== Kramer and Zondi novels ==
- The Steam Pig (1971)
- The Caterpillar Cop (1972)
- The Gooseberry Fool (1974)
- Snake (1975)
- The Sunday Hangman (1977)
- The Blood of an Englishman (1980)
- The Artful Egg (1984)
- The Song Dog (1991)
