= John Hutton (author) =

British writer (1928–2022)

John Harwood Hutton (21 November 1928 – 29 June 2022) was a British writer of crime and thriller novels.

Hutton was born in Manchester on 21 November 1928, and educated at Burnage Grammar School and the University of Wales. Based in Llanfairpwllgwyngyll on Anglesey, he was a teacher and a senior lecturer in English. He died in Tŷ Mawr, Anglesey on 29 June 2022, at the age of 93.

== Bibliography ==
- 29, Herriott Street (1979)
- Accidental Crimes (1983); Gold Dagger Award
