= James H. McClure =

British writer

- Born: James Howe McClure; 9 October 1939; Johannesburg, South Africa
- Died: 17 June 2006 (aged 66); Oxford, England
- Occupations: Author, journalist
- Writing career
- Genre: Mystery fiction
- Notable work: Kramer and Zondi series

James Howe McClure (9 October 1939, Johannesburg, South Africa – 17 June 2006, Oxford, England) was a British author and journalist best known for his Kramer and Zondi mysteries set in South Africa.

== Early life and career ==
James McClure was born and raised in South Africa and educated in Pietermaritzburg, Natal, at Scottsville School (1947–51), Cowan House (1952–54), and Maritzburg College (1955–58). He worked first as a commercial photographer with Tom Sharpe, who later wrote a series of celebrated comic novels, and then as a teacher of English and art at Cowan House in 1959–63, before becoming a crime reporter and photographer for the Natal Witness in his home town of Pietermaritzburg.

His journalistic career saw him headhunted first by the Natal Mercury and then by the Natal Daily News. After the birth of his first son, he moved to Britain with his family in 1965, where he joined the Scottish Daily Mail as a sub-editor. From there, he moved to the Oxford Mail and then to the Oxford Times.

== Writing career ==
His first crime novel, The Steam Pig, won the CWA Gold Dagger in 1971. He resigned as deputy editor in 1974 to write full-time. He added to his series of police procedurals based on his experiences in South Africa, featuring the detective partnership of Afrikaner Lieutenant Tromp Kramer and Bantu Detective Sergeant Mickey Zondi.

McClure also wrote a spy novel set in Southern Africa – Rogue Eagle – which won the 1976 CWA Silver Dagger, a number of short stories, and two large non-fiction works that won wide acclaim: Spike Island: Portrait of a Police Division (Liverpool) and Copworld: Inside an American Police Force (San Diego).

After publishing 14 books, he returned to the bottom rung of "The Oxford Times" in 1986, as his police books had made him aware of how much he had missed working with others – his intention being to write in his spare time. What proved his most popular Kramer and Zondi novel then followed, The Song Dog, but journalism soon became all consuming. He became editor in 1994 and three years later The Oxford Times won the Weekly Newspaper of the Year award, beating all comers from across the United Kingdom.

He was promoted to editor of the Oxford Mail in 2000, and spent the next three years on a variety of objectives to enhance the quality and revenue of the county's daily paper. That done, he decided it was time to again step down, and retired to return to writing. He was working on a novel set in Oxford and had just started his own blog when he came down with a respiratory illness and died on 17 June 2006. He lived in Wallingford, Oxfordshire.

== Bibliography ==
=== Kramer and Zondi novels ===
- The Steam Pig (1971)
- The Caterpillar Cop (1972)
- The Gooseberry Fool (1974)
- Snake (1975)
- The Sunday Hangman (1977)
- The Blood of an Englishman (1980)
- The Artful Egg (1984)
- The Song Dog (1991)

=== Other novels ===
- Four and Twenty Virgins (1973)
- Rogue Eagle (1976)
- Imago: A Modern Comedy of Manners (1988)

=== Short story and script collection (including The Steam Pig film adaptation) ===
- God It Was Fun (2014)

=== Non-fiction books ===
- Killers: A Companion to the Thames Television Series By Clive Exton (1976)
- Spike Island: Portrait of a British Police Division (1980)
- Cop World: Inside an American Police Force (1984)
