= Black River (novel) =

2022 novel

- Author: Nilanjana Roy
- Genre: Mystery
- Published: 2022 (Westland)
- ISBN: 9789395767118

Black River is a book written by Nilanjana Roy and published by Westland Books.

== Plot ==
The book is about a crime saga and murder mystery which explores love, grief and friendship. Black River is set in a fictional village called Teetarpur near Delhi and centers around the murder of an 8-year old girl named Munia. The book explores themes of vigilante justice, religious discrimination, migrant struggles, political manipulation, corruption, misogyny, class barriers, and ecological destruction.

== Critical reception and reviews ==
Sheila Kumar of Deccan Herald listed it in "the best of 2022". It was on the hotlist for 2022 London Book Fair.

Amrita Dutta of The Wire (India) wrote "The writing of Black River is vivid and lyrical", Mukund Padmanabhan of Frontline (magazine) wrote "Roy's decision to frame the plot against the politics of the times is unexceptionable", Bindu Menon of The Tribune India wrote "Franz Kafka once said, "A book must be the axe for the frozen sea inside us." Roy's 'Black River' makes the cut." Saloni Sharma of Scroll.in wrote "With all its literary merit, Black River is also a book that is likely to appeal to most readers of crime fiction."

The book has been also reviewed by Sheila Kumar of The New Indian Express and Sucheta Dasgupta of The Asian Age.
