= Francis Clifford (author) =

British author (1917–1975)

Arthur Leonard Bell Thompson DSO (1 December 1917 – 24 August 1975), known by the pen name of Francis Clifford, was a British writer of crime and thriller novels.

== Biography ==
Thompson was born on 1 December 1917 in Bristol, England. Prior to the Second World War, he worked as a Commercial Assistant in the rice trade, starting in London in 1935 and later in Burma from 1938–9. During the war he was commissioned into the Burma Rifles and served with the Special Operations Executive, serving first in India and then in London. After returning to civilian life he worked as a journalist in the steel industry, and took up writing in his spare time. In 1959 he left his position and started writing full-time. Thompson was married twice, first to Marjorie Bennett in 1944 and then, in 1955, following the dissolution of his first marriage, to Josephine Devereux. He had two sons.

From the late 1950s until his death in Weybridge in 1975, Thompson wrote 18 novels under the name Francis Clifford. His earlier novels were set in Southeast Asia and drew heavily on his experiences there during the Second World War.

== Bibliography ==
=== Novels ===
- Honour the Shrine (1953)
- The Trembling Earth (1955)
- Overdue (1957)
- Something to Love (1958)
- Act of Mercy (1960); US title: Guns of Darkness
- A Battle is Fought to Be Won (1960)
- Time is an Ambush (1962)
- The Green Fields of Eden (1963)
- The Hunting-Ground (1964)
- The Third Side of the Coin (1965)
- The Naked Runner (1966)
- All Men Are Lonely Now (1967)
- Another Way of Dying (1968); Silver Dagger Award
- The Blind Side (1971)
- A Wild Justice (1972)
- Amigo, Amigo (1973); shortlisted for Edgar Award
- The Grosvenor Square Goodbye (1974); US title: Good-Bye and Amen; Silver Dagger Award, shortlisted for Edgar Award
- Drummer in the Dark (1976)
- Desperate Journey (1979)

=== Short story collections ===
- Ten Minutes on a June Morning (1977)
