= John Sherwood (author) =

British fiction writer (1913–2002)

John Sherwood (1913 – 2002) was an author of fiction. He wrote the cozy Celia Grant Horticultural mystery series, amongst others. Two of his novels, Undiplomatic Exit (1958) and Death at the BBC (1983) were finalists for the Gold Dagger award.

== Publications ==
=== Charles Blessington series ===
- Disappearance of Dr. Bruderstein (1949)
- Mr. Blessington's Imperialist Plot (1951)
- Ambush for Anatol (1952) (US title: Murder of a Mistress)
- Two Died in Singapore (1954)
- Vote Against Poison (1956)

=== Celia Grant series ===
- Green Trigger Fingers (1984)
- A Botanist at Bay (1985)
- The Mantrap Garden (1986)
- Flowers of Evil (1987)
- Menacing Groves (1988)
- A Bouquet of Thorns (1989)
- The Sunflower Plot (1990)
- The Hanging Garden (1992)
- Creeping Jenny (1993)
- Bones Gather No Moss (1994)
- Shady Borders (1996)

=== Other novels ===
- Undiplomatic Exit (1958)
- Half Hunter (1961) (US title: The Sleuth and the Liar)
- Honesty Will Get You Nowhere (1977)
- The Limericks of Lachasse (1978)
- Hour of the Hyenas (1979)
- A Shot in the Arm (1982) (US title: Death at the BBC)
