= Vaseem Khan =

British writer

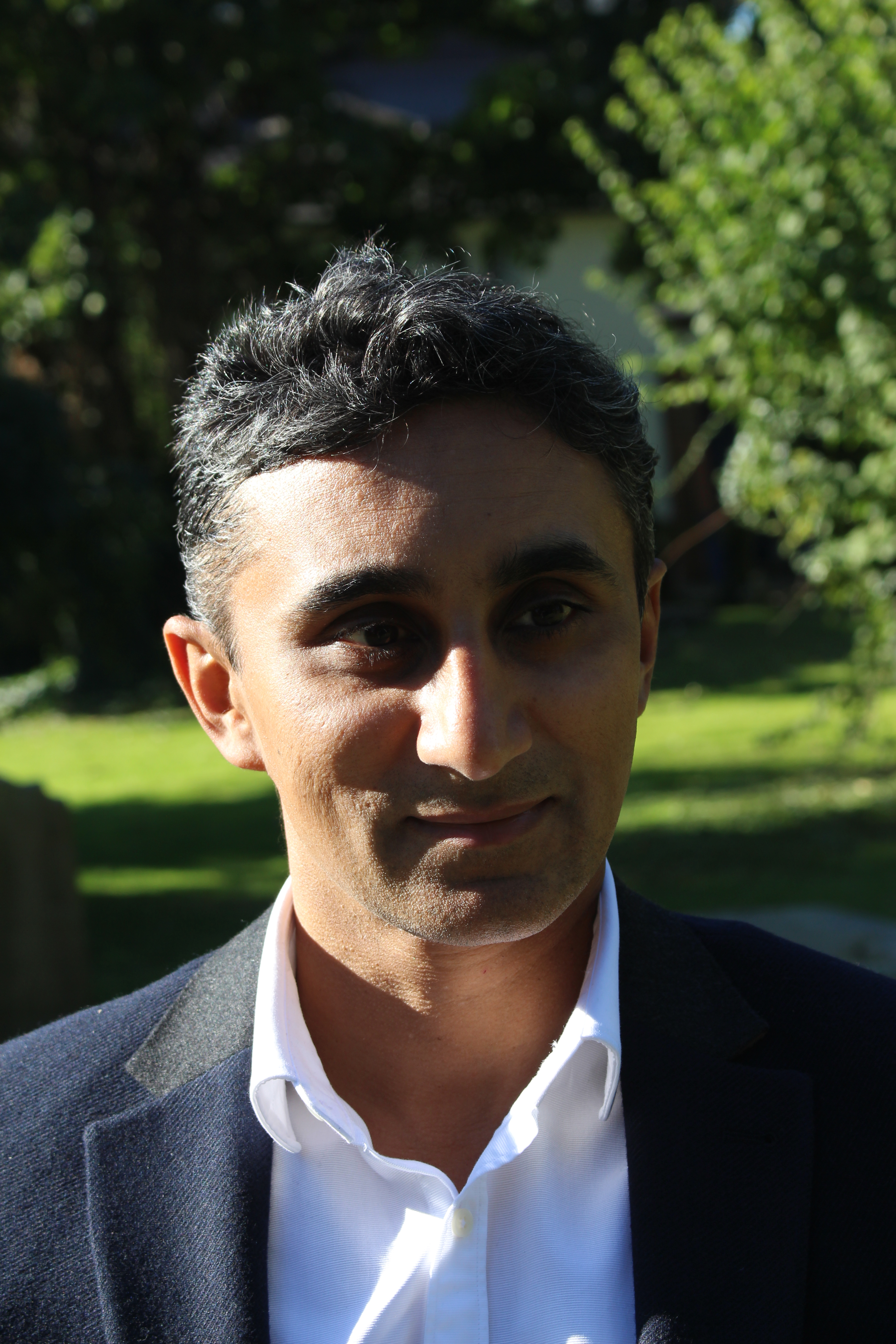
- Author Vaseem Khan
- Born: Vaseem Khan; 1973 (age 52–53); London, England
- Education: London School of Economics
- Occupations: Author, Business Development Director
- Writing career
- Notable works: Baby Ganesh Detective Agency series

Vaseem Khan (born 1973) is a British writer, author of the Baby Ganesh Detective Agency novels – a series of crime novels set in India–featuring retired Mumbai police Inspector Ashwin Chopra and his sidekick, a baby elephant named Ganesha. Previously Khan won a Shamus Award and the Eastern Eye's Arts Culture & Theatre Awards for Literature. Khan is also the author of the Malabar House crime novels, beginning with Midnight at Malabar House (2020), set in 1950s India and introducing India's first female police detective working with an English forensic scientist. In Oct 2025, Quantum of Menace by Khan was published. This is the first in a series of small town mysteries featuring Q from the James Bond franchise, authorised by the Ian Fleming estate.

== Biography ==
Khan worked for ten years as a management consultant to an Indian hotel group building environmentally-friendly hotels around the country, called ECOTELS. He returned to the United Kingdom in 2006 and has since worked at University College London for the Department of Security and Crime Science.

Khan's time in India led to him writing The Unexpected Inheritance of Inspector Chopra. Khan was offered a four-book contract by Mullholland Books, an imprint of publishers Hodder & Stoughton, for the first books in this series, referred to as the Baby Ganesh Detective Agency series.

In January 2016, The Unexpected Inheritance of Inspector Chopra was selected for the Waterstones Book Club, and later named a Waterstones Paperback of the Year.

In 2021, Khan was awarded the Sapere Books Historical Dagger Award by the Crime Writers' Association. In May 2023, Khan was elected the chair of the Crime Writers' Association.

== Works ==
The Unexpected Inheritance of Inspector Chopra is the first novel in the Baby Ganesh Detective Agency series, in which newly-retired Inspector Chopra investigates the suspicious drowning of a poor local boy. At the same time he comes to grips with being sent a baby elephant by his long-lost uncle. Published in August 2015, it went on to become a Times best-seller. Khan has said that his aim was to give readers an idea of what India "looks like, feels like, sounds like, smells like, even tastes like".

The Baby Ganesh Detective Agency series continues with:

- 2016: The Perplexing Theft of the Jewel in the Crown
- 2017: The Strange Disappearance of a Bollywood Star
- 2018: Murder at the Grand Raj Palace
- 2019: Bad Day at the Vulture Club

Khan has also written two novellas in this series:

- 2018: Inspector Chopra & the Million Dollar Motor Car
- 2019: Last Victim of the Monsoon Express

The Malabar House series started with Midnight at Malabar House (2020).Khan won the Crime Writers Association Historical Crime Dagger award for 2021 for this novel. The series continues with:

- 2021: The Dying Day
- 2022: The Lost Man of Bombay
- 2023: Death of a Lesser God
- 2024: City of Destruction
- 2026: The Edge of Darkness
- 2027: The Last Shot

In 2025, Khan released Quantum of Menace, featuring Q from the James Bond franchise as the central protagonist. After his MI6 career comes to a sudden end, Q (a.k.a. Major Boothroyd) returns to his hometown and sets about solving the murder of a childhood friend. A sequel, The Man with the Golden Compass, will be released in 2026.
