= Colin Cotterill =

English and Australian author

- Born: 2 October 1952 (age 73); London, United Kingdom
- Occupation: Author
- Writing career
- Years active: 2000–present
- Genre: Mystery fiction
- Notable work: Dr. Siri Paiboun series

Colin Cotterill (born 2 October 1952) is a London-born teacher, author, comic book writer and cartoonist. Cotterill has dual British and Australian citizenship. He lives in Thailand, where he has written the award-winning Dr Siri Paiboun mystery series set in the Lao People's Democratic Republic, and the Jimm Juree crime novels set in southern Thailand.

== Biography ==
Colin Cotterill was born in London and trained as a teacher. He worked as a physical education instructor in Israel, a primary school teacher in Australia, a counsellor for educationally handicapped adults in the United States, and a university lecturer in Japan. More recently he has taught and trained teachers in Thailand and on the Burmese border. He spent several years in Laos, initially with UNESCO, and wrote and produced a forty-programme language teaching series, English By Accident, for Thai national television.

Cotterill also became involved in child protection in the region and set up an NGO in Phuket, which he ran for the first two years. After two more years studying child abuse and one more stint in Phuket, he moved on to ECPAT, an international organisation combating child prostitution and pornography, and established their training programme for caregivers. During this time Cotterill contributed regular columns to the Bangkok Post.

Cotterill set up the Books for Laos project to send books to Lao children and sponsor trainee teachers. Books for Laos receives support from fans of the books and is administered on a voluntary basis. He has also been involved in Big Brother Mouse, a not-for-profit publishing project in Laos founded by Sasha Alyson.

Cotterill's first novel, The Night Bastard, was published by Suk's Editions in 2000. The positive reaction prompted him to become a full-time writer. His subsequent books include Evil in the Land Without (2003), Pool and Its Role in Asian Communism (2005), The Coroner's Lunch (2004), Thirty-Three Teeth (2005), Disco for the Departed (2006), Anarchy and Old Dogs (2007), Curse of the Pogo Stick (2008), The Merry Misogynist (2009), Love Songs from a Shallow Grave (2010), and Slash and Burn (2011).

In 2009 Cotterill received the Crime Writers' Association "Dagger in the Library" award as "the author of crime fiction whose work is currently giving the greatest enjoyment to library users".

Since 1990 Cotterill has been a regular cartoonist for national publications in Thailand. A Thai-language translation of his cartoon scrapbook Ethel and Joan Go to Phuket was published by Matichon in 2004. On 4 April 2004 he launched an illustrated bilingual column, Cycle Logical, in the news magazine Matichon Weekly. Some of these columns have since been collected in a book.

== Awards ==
- 2010 Finalist, Dilys Award for "Love Songs from a Shallow Grave"
- 2009 CWA "Dagger in The Library" award for The Dr. Siri Series
- 2009 Short-listed for Crimefest "Last Laugh Award" for Anarchy and Old Dogs
- 2008 Short-listed for "CWA Dagger" for The Coroner's Lunch
- 2007 Prix SNCF Du Polar for Le Dejeuner du Coroner (The Coroner's Lunch)
- 2006 Dilys Award for Thirty Three Teeth
- 2005 Nominee for Barry Award "Best First Novel" for The Coroner's Lunch

== Bibliography ==
=== Dr Siri Paiboun series ===
- The Coroner's Lunch (2004) - Soho Press, New York. ISBN 1-56947-376-5
- Thirty-Three Teeth (August 2005) - Soho Press, New York. ISBN 1-56947-388-9
- Disco for the Departed (August 2006) - Soho Press, New York. ISBN 1-56947-464-8
- Anarchy and Old Dogs (August 2007) - Soho Press, New York. ISBN 1-56947-463-X
- Curse of the Pogo Stick (August 2008) - Soho Press, New York, ISBN 1-56947-485-0
- The Merry Misogynist (August 2009) -
  - Soho Press, New York. ISBN 1-56947-556-3,
  - Quercus, UK. ISBN 1-84916-008-2
- Love Songs from a Shallow Grave (August 2010) - Soho Press, New York. ISBN 978-1-56947-627-7
- Slash and Burn (October 2011) - Quercus Publishing Plc, London. ISBN 978-0-85738-198-9
- The Woman Who Wouldn't Die (January 2013) - Quercus Publishing Plc, London. ISBN 978-1-78087-832-4
- Six and a Half Deadly Sins (June 2015) - Soho Crime, New York. ISBN 978-1-61695-5588
- I Shot the Buddha (August 2016) - Soho Crime, New York. ISBN 978-1-61695-722-3
- The Rat Catchers' Olympics (August 2017) - Soho Crime, New York. ISBN 978-1-61695-825-1
- Don't Eat Me (August 2018) - Soho Crime, New York. ISBN 978-1-61695-940-1
- The Second Biggest Nothing (2019)
- The Delightful Life of a Suicide Pilot (2020)

=== Jimm Juree series ===
- Killed at the Whim of a Hat (July 2011) - Minotaur Books, New York ISBN 978-0-312-56453-7
- Grandad, There's a Head on the Beach (June 2012) - Minotaur Books, New York ISBN 978-0-312-56454-4
- The Axe Factor (April 2014) - Minotaur Books, New York ISBN 9781250043368
- The Amok Runners (June 2016) - CreateSpace Independent Publishing Platform ISBN 978-1533265289

=== Other publications ===
- The Motion Picture Teller (January 2023) - Soho Crime ISBN 978-1641294355
- Bleeding in Black and White (April 2015) - CreateSpace Independent Publishing Platform ISBN 978-1511671293
- Ageing Disgracefully (October 2009) - iUniverse, USA
- Cyclelogical
  - Weekly column - Matichon Suth Supdah Magazine. Thailand.
  - Cyclelogical collection in book form (2006) (ขับช้าชิดซ้าย) - Matichon, Bangkok, ISBN 974-323-709-7
- Pool and its Role in Asian Communism (2005) - CreateSpace Independent Publishing Platform, ISBN 978-1500750404
- Ethel and Joan Go to Phuket (2004) (ภูเก็ตพังแน่ แม่แม่กำลังมา) - Matichon Publishing House (Thai language), Thailand ISBN 974-323-236-2
- Evil in the Land Without (2003) - CreateSpace Independent Publishing Platform ISBN 978-1500994914
- The Night Bastard (2000) - Suk's Editions, Thailand ISBN 974-7457-24-5
