= Douglas Rutherford =

Irish-born British crime writer (1915-1988)

- Born: James Douglas Rutherford McConnell; 14 October 1915; Kilkenny, Ireland
- Died: 29 April 1988 (aged 72); Monxton near Andover, Hampshire
- Writing career
- Pen name: Douglas Rutherford
- Language: English
- Years active: 1950–1987
- Genre: Detective novels

James Douglas Rutherford McConnell (14 October 1915 – 29 April 1988) who used the pen-name Douglas Rutherford was a language teacher and an author.

== Biography ==
Born in Kilkenny, Ireland 14 October 1915. He went to school in Yorkshire, studied at Clare College, Cambridge, graduating in 1937, and received his MA from the University of Reading. During the Second World War, he served in the British Army Intelligence Corps in North Africa and Italy. After demobilisation, he became a modern languages teacher at Eton College from 1946 until his retirement in 1973.

Writing on weekends and holidays, he published his first novel, Comes the Blind Fury, in 1950. Many of his works centered on race-tracks or sports cars. With Francis Durbridge, he co-authored two novels in the Paul Temple series: The Tyler Mystery in 1957 and East of Algiers in 1959. Under the name James McConnell, he published books on learning foreign languages and on Eton.

He joined the Detection Club in 1970.

He married, in 1939, Margaret Worsley 'Peggy' Gandy (1910–1952) - daughter of Surg.-Cdr. Eric Worsley Gandy OBE; and secondly in 1953, Laura Margaret Goodwin (1922–2001).

He died on 29 April 1988 in Monxton, Hampshire.

== Works ==
=== Novels ===
==== Series: Paddy Regan ====
- Comes the Blind Fury, 1950
- Meet a Body, 1951
- Telling of Murder, 1952 (alternative title Flight into Peril)

==== Series: Paul Temple (with Francis Durbridge) ====
- The Tyler Mystery, 1957
- East of Algiers, 1959

==== Other novels ====
- The Chequered Flag, 1956
- Grand Prix Murder, 1955
- The Perilous Sky, 1956
- The Long Echo, 1957
- A Shriek of Tyres, 1958 (US title On the Track of Death, 1959)
- Murder Is Incidental, 1961
- The Creeping Flesh, 1963
- Best Motor Racing Stories, 1965 (ed.)
- The Black Leather Murders, 1966
- Skin for Skin, 1968
- The Gilt-edged Cockpit, 1969
- Clear the Fast Lane, 1971
- Kick Start, 1973
- Killer on the Track, 1973
- The Gunshot Grand Prix, 1972
- Rally to the Death, 1974
- Race Against the Sun, 1975
- Mystery Tour, 1975
- Return Load, 1977
- Collision Course, 1978
- Turbo, 1980
- The Benedictine Commando, 1980
- Porcupine Basin, 1981
- Stop at Nothing, 1983
- Battlefield Madonna, 1985
- A Game of Sudden Death, 1987

=== Short story ===
- The Last Bullet, 1951
- Assignment in San Sebastian, (Pocket Book Weekly 23 Apr 1955)
- End of an Epoch in 'Omnibus of Speed' (Putnam 1958)
- Best Underworld Stories (ed) (Faber & Faber 1969)

=== Non-fiction Books ===
Written as James McConnell or J. D. R. McConnell

- Learn Italian Quickly, 1960
- Learn Spanish Quickly, 1961
- Learn French Quickly, 1966
- Eton: How It Works, 1967
- Eton Repointed: The New Structures of an Ancient Foundation, 1970 with photographs by Ray Williams
- Treasures of Eton, 1976 (ed.)
- Early Learning Foundation, 1979
- English Public Schools, 1985

== Sources ==
- Mesplède, Claude (1994), Les années "Série noire" : bibliographie critique d'une collection policière (in French), vol. 3 1966-1972, Amiens: Editions Encrage, ISBN 978-2-906-38953-3.
- Mesplède, Claude (1995), Les années "Série noire" : bibliographie critique d'une collection policière (in French), vol. 4 1972-1982, Amiens: Editions Encrage, ISBN 978-2-906-38963-2.
- Mesplède, Claude; Schleret, Jean-Jacques (1982), SN, voyage au bout de la Noire : inventaire de 732 auteurs et de leurs œuvres publiés en séries Noire et Blème : suivi d'une filmographie complète (in French), Paris: Futuropoli.
