= The Lover (Wilson novel) =

2004 novel by Laura Wilson

- First edition cover
- Author: Laura Wilson
- Language: English
- Genre: crime fiction
- Publisher: Orion Publishing Group
- Publication date: 17 June 2004
- Publication place: United Kingdom
- Media type: Print (Hardcover)
- Pages: 282 pp (first edition)
- ISBN: 0-7528-5980-3
- OCLC: 59271349

The Lover is a 2004 crime fiction novel written by Laura Wilson and first published in the United Kingdom by Orion Publishing Group on 17 June 2004. A fictionalized account of the activities of a serial killer known as Blackout Ripper who began killing prostitutes in London during World War II, the novel follows the viewpoints of three different people, including the killer, as their individual lives begin to intersect.

It was released in the United States by Orion's American branch. The novel was nominated for two 2004 Crime Writers' Association awards. The French translation, released in 2005 by Albin Michel, won the Prix Littéraires 2004 Prix du Polar Europeen. Critics heavily praised the work, with British papers The Independent and the Telegraph's reviewers both selecting it as one of the best novels of 2004.

== Synopsis ==
Set in World War II England, The Lover is a novel based on the real-life case of serial killer Gordon Cummins, also known as the Blackout Ripper. A 28-year-old British airman, Cummins began strangling and mutilating female prostitutes in London during the bombing and subsequent blackout in the city. The novel looks at the events from three view points: a female prostitute with a young son who is a potential victim, a woman who met Cummings and became infatuated with him, and Cummins himself.

== Publication history ==
Orion Publishing Group first published the novel in the United Kingdom in hardback from on 17 June 2004. It was published in the United States the following week. The paperback version was published in the United Kingdom on 21 April 2005, and in the United States on 28 June 2005.

It was translated to French and released as L'Amant Anglais on 1 April 2005 by Albin Michel.

== Reception ==
The Lover was nominated for the Crime Writers' Association's Gold Dagger and Ellis Peters Historical Dagger awards, but did not win either. The French translation won the Prix Littéraires 2004 Prix du Polar Europeen award for the "Best Crime Novel of the Year In Translation" in 2004.

The Independent listed The Lover as one of its choices for best crime fiction novel of 2004. Reviewer Jane Jakeman praised Wilson for her "meticulous" research on historical elements of the novel and considered the novel to be a "terrific read" that "continues the Dickensian tradition of the London crime novel." The Telegraph's Susanna Yager also chose the novel as one of the top thrillers of 2004, noting that Wilson is "very good at creating an authentic period atmosphere".

New Books's David James felt the novel was "compulsive reading" and praised Wilson's ability to portray the "uneasy atmosphere" and provide the "perfect setting" for story. The Birmingham Post's Mike Ripley effusively praised the novel as being "quite simply superb: not only the best thing she has written to date, but certainly one of the best crime novels of the year." In particular, he noted that Wilson provided a convincing view of 1940s London and her lifelike characters.
