= The Survivors (Raven novel) =

1976 novel in the Alms for Oblivion sequence by Simon Raven

- First edition (publ. Blond & Briggs)
- Author: Simon Raven
- Language: English
- Series: Alms for Oblivion
- Genre: Fiction
- Publisher: Blond & Briggs
- Publication date: 1976
- Publication place: United Kingdom
- Media type: Print (Hardcover)
- Preceded by: Come Like Shadows
- Followed by: None

The Survivors is Volume X of the novel sequence Alms for Oblivion by Simon Raven, published in 1976. It is the tenth and last novel to be published of the sequence and is also the tenth novel chronologically. The story takes place in Venice in 1973.

== Plot summary ==
In Venice during the autumn of 1973, the characters of Captain Detterling, Fielding Gray, and Mr. and Mrs. Stern take part in a meeting of the International PEN Club. A man named Tom Llewyllyn and his daughter "Baby" are also attending. After the conference, the attendees are told of the death of Lord Canteloupe, Minister of Commerce. Since the lord has lost his son (in Volume VII, Sound The Retreat) and his male siblings are dead, Detterling will inherit his title, being the closest male relative. Peter Morrison succeeds Canteloupe as Minister of Commerce.

Tom Llewyllyn mentions that he is waiting for Daniel Mond, but does not reveal that Mond is dying and wants to spend his last days in Venice. The group meets Max de Freville and Stratis "Lyki" Lykiadopolous, who are about to open a casino in the city. With them is a young Sicilian named Piero. Max and Lyki live in Palazzo Albani, which they are renting from the absentee owners. Detterling arranges for Tom and Daniel to live in the tower of the palazzo. During a dinner, the company discusses the family portraits of the house, including one of an unknown young man. Detterling brings Baby back to England and they become friends. Together with her aunt Isobel, Detterling helps Baby go to a different school. Isobel and Gregory tell Detterling how Baby's mother, Patricia, ended up in a psychiatric hospital.

Piero, who has become friends with Daniel, makes a trip with him to a monastery on the island of San Francesco del Deserto. While there, Daniel recognises one of the Franciscan friars as former undergraduate Hugh Balliston (from Places Where They Sing). Balliston deeply regrets his actions of 1967 and has become a monk. Meanwhile, Lyki and Max have troubles with rich Arabs who play with high stakes in their casino, which means the partners need more money at hand. Piero finds an old manuscript from the late 18th century containing part of the story about the Albani family. Fielding Gray discovers that the young man in the painting is an Englishman named Humbert FitzAvon. After having found another manuscript, Fielding realises that FitzAvon, who in 1797 was hanged by a mob of peasants, was the son of the first Lord Canteloupe. He had corrupted the Albani family and married a peasant girl he had gotten pregnant before being killed. Fielding realizes that if any male descendants of FitzAvon are alive, one of them is really the rightful Lord Canteloupe. With Tom and Piero, Fielding heads to the place where FitzAvon is buried and meets Jude Holbrook, who lives in the area with his mother. With the help of Holbrook, the company finds a living male descendant, a little boy named Paolo Filavoni. No one wants to reveal the secret, since this would mean trouble for Detterling, but Piero eventually tells Lyki. Fielding uses the story for a novel, but changes the facts radically.

Daniel, who has been investigating a tool being used in the casino, dies. Piero talks to Hugh, who agrees to let them bury Daniel on his island. The major characters all participate in a funeral procession by boat for Daniel, except for Fielding and Leonard Percival, who watch the procession from a bridge. Many people from Daniel's life (and characters from the novel sequence in general) attend: Robert Constable, Jacquiz Helmut, Balbo Blakeney, soldiers Chead and Bunce, journalist Alfie Schroeder, and Mond's old nemesis Earl Restarick. During the procession, Lyki tries to blackmail Detterling about his title since he needs money. Detterling reveals that Daniel had found out that the instrument he was studying is used for cheating in the casino. Detterling promises to keep quiet about this if Lyki does the same. The funeral ends and the participants strike up conversations in their boats on the way back. Only Piero, who is now going to become a friar, notices a black stain spreading across the water of the lagoon.
