= Albany (London) =

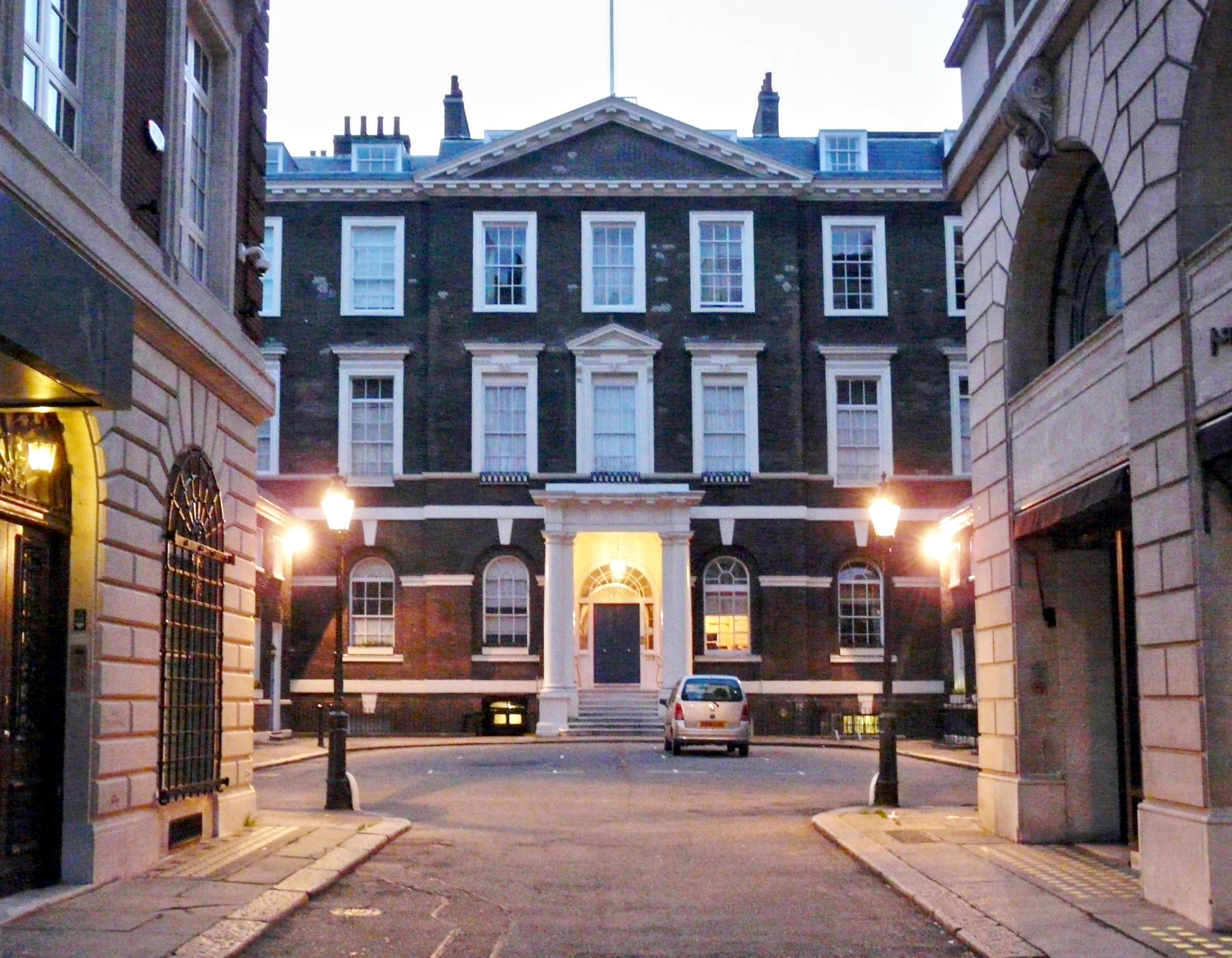
- Albany at dusk (May 2014)
- Former names: Melbourne House
- Etymology: Prince Frederick, Duke of York and Albany

General information
- Type: Residential apartment block
- Location: Albany Court Yard, Piccadilly, London, United Kingdom
- Coordinates: 51°30′32″N 0°8′19″W
- Current tenants: Various
- Construction started: 1771
- Completed: 1776
- Owner: Peterhouse, Cambridge, various

Design and construction
- Architects: William Chambers; Henry Holland
- Listed Building – Grade I

Albany, sometimes referred to as the Albany, is an English apartment complex in Piccadilly, London. The three-storey mansion was built in the 1770s and divided into apartments in 1802.

== Building ==
Albany was built in 1771–1776 by Sir William Chambers for the newly created Viscount Melbourne, who had bought the land and residence (Piccadilly House) it was to replace from Henry Fox, 1st Baron Holland, for £16,500. It was called Melbourne House and cost at least £50,000 to build. It is a three-storey mansion, seven bays (windows) wide, with a pair of service wings flanking a front courtyard.

In 1791, Lord Melbourne, who by then had built up considerable debts to fund his and his wife's extravagant lifestyle, downsized by exchanging Melbourne House for Dover House in Whitehall (now a government office) with the recently married Prince Frederick, Duke of York and Albany, who required a larger property in order to "entertain in style". The sale price was £23,571. The Duke in turn gave up the house in 1802, and it was converted by Henry Holland into 69 bachelor apartments (known as "sets"). This was achieved by subdividing the main block and its two service wings, and by adding two new parallel long buildings covering most of the garden, running as far as a new rear gate building on Burlington Gardens. Named The Ropewalk, Holland's new buildings of 1802–1803 flank a covered walkway supported on thin iron columns and with an upswept roof. The blocks are white-painted render, in a simpler Regency style than Chambers' work. Most sets are accessed from common staircases without doors, in a fashion similar to that of Oxbridge colleges and the Inns of Court.

== History ==
From the time of its conversion, Albany was a prestigious set of bachelor apartments. Residents have included the poet Lord Byron, the future prime minister William Ewart Gladstone and numerous members of the aristocracy.

During the Second World War, one of the buildings received significant damage from a German bomb, but was reconstructed after the war to appear as an exact replica.

The Albany Trust is named after the building, for it held its inaugural meetings there in the late 1950s, at the home of its founding trustees Jacquetta Hawkes and J. B. Priestley.

Residents no longer have to be bachelors, although children under the age of 14 are not permitted to live there.

== Ownership and governance ==
The apartments or "sets" are individually owned as flying freeholds, the owners being known as "proprietors"; a set that came up for sale in 2007 had an advertised guide price of £2 million.

Around half the sets were owned by Peterhouse, a college of the University of Cambridge. These had been acquired by William Stone (1857–1958) during the Second World War. Stone, nicknamed the "Squire of Piccadilly", was a former scholar of Peterhouse, a bachelor and a lifelong resident of Albany. He bequeathed 37 sets to the college, along with other endowments.

Albany is governed by a board of trustees on behalf of the proprietors. The annual rent of a set can be as much as £50,000 and prospective tenants are vetted by a committee before being allowed to take up residence. Only recently have women been allowed to apply. G. B. Stern states that she and Gwen Ffrangeon-Davies were residents in 1942 and describes the bomb damage to her chambers.

== Name ==
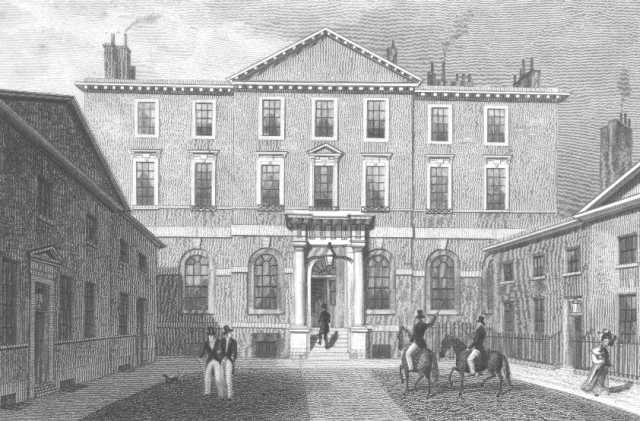
Drawing by Thomas H. Shepherd, c. 1830

The names "Albany" and "the Albany" have both been used. The rules adopted in 1804 laid down that "the Premises mentioned in the foregoing Articles shall be called Albany". Both names have been used in the 19th and 20th centuries. In a 1958 review of a book about the building, Peace in Piccadilly, The Times wrote, "Albany or the Albany? It has long been a snobbish test of intimate knowledge of the West End. If one was in use, a man could feel superior by using the other. When G. S. Street wrote The Ghosts of Piccadilly in 1907, he said that 'the Albany' was then 'universal', but that to the earliest tenants it was 'Albany'."

== In fiction ==
An early use of the building in fiction was the novel, The Bachelor of the Albany (1847) by Marmion Wilard Savage. Still earlier is the hero of Benjamin Disraeli’s novel Sybil (1845), Charles Egremont, who lives there; he has a portrait by Cristofano Allori hung over his fireplace halfway through the book.

In Dorothy Sayers' novel Clouds of Witness (1926), Dennis Cathcart, whose death is central to the story, is said to "have a room in Albany."

Mr Fascination Fledgeby, a moneylender in Charles Dickens' novel Our Mutual Friend (1865), is described as living there. Several scenes from the book take place in his apartment. In the novel The Picture of Dorian Gray (1890) by Oscar Wilde, Lord Fermor, the uncle of the character Lord Henry Wotton, resides in Albany. In Oscar Wilde's play The Importance of Being Earnest (1895), the character John (Jack) Worthing has a set at Albany (number B.4), where he lives while staying in London under the assumed name of Ernest.

A. J. Raffles, the gentleman burglar created by E. W. Hornung who first appeared in "The Ides of March" (1898), lived at Albany, as did the adventurer Lord John Roxton of Arthur Conan Doyle's novel The Lost World (1912), and Roger Sheringham, the amateur detective in the works of Anthony Berkeley Cox who first appeared in The Layton Court Mystery (1925). In G. K. Chesterton's Father Brown Stories, in "The Queer Feet" (1910), the character Mr Audrey "[looks] like a mild, self-indulgent bachelor, with rooms in the Albany -- which he was".

In the comic short story "Uncle Fred Flits By" (1935) by P. G. Wodehouse, the young gentleman Pongo Twistleton resides in Albany. In The Foundling (1948), a novel by Georgette Heyer, Captain Gideon Ware of the Life Guards rents a set of chambers at Albany. In the film Kind Hearts and Coronets (1949), Louis Mazzini takes a small set at Albany as he moves up the social ladder.

In the James Bond novel Moonraker by Ian Fleming (1955), Max Meyer, the bridge partner of Sir Hugo Drax, was said to live in Albany. Simon Raven's Alms for Oblivion novels (including 1974's Bring Forth the Body) feature Somerset Lloyd-James, a politician and resident of Albany.

In Graham Greene's The Human Factor (1978), Dr Percival resides at D.6. In The Sorcerer (1978), an occult thriller by Eric Ericson, a pivotal protagonist called Robert is referred to as living at Albany. In the Major Harry Maxim novels by Gavin Lyall, George Harbinger, Harry's boss, who first appears in The Secret Servant (1980), has an apartment at Albany where he lives with his spouse, Annette. In Susan Howatch's Starbridge series, Perry Palmer lives in Albany. In Julian Fellowes' novel Belgravia (2016), Mr John Bellasis resides in an apartment at Albany.

== Tenants ==
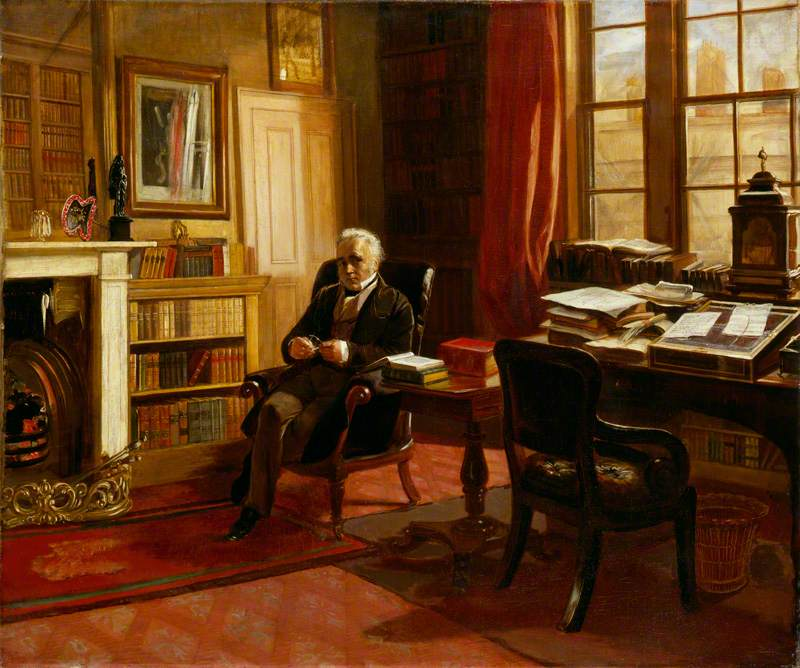
Portrait of Thomas Babington Macaulay by Edward Matthew Ward, 1853. Macaulay is shown in his study at the Albany.

The list below is based mainly on the much longer list in the Survey of London. Many tenants were in residence for only a short time when they were young.

- Antony Armstrong-Jones, later created Earl of Snowdon, photographer
- Sir Squire Bancroft, actor
- George Basevi, architect
- Clifford Bax, poet and playwright
- Sybille Bedford, writer, lived in Aldous Huxley's servant's room
- Sir Thomas Beecham, conductor
- Isaiah Berlin, philosopher
- Sir Philip Bobbitt, scholar
- Henry Brougham, later Lord Chancellor
- Edward Bulwer-Lytton, writer and politician
- Lord Byron, poet
- George Canning, politician
- George Cattermole, artist
- Bruce Chatwin, writer
- Alan Clark, historian and politician
- Sir Kenneth Clark, art historian
- Keith Coventry, artist
- Fleur Cowles, writer and editor
- Maurice Cowling, historian
- Edward de Bono, thinker
- Dame Edith Evans, actress
- William Ewart Gladstone, later Prime Minister of the United Kingdom
- Norman Foster, architect
- Andrew Grima, jewellery designer
- Bryan Guinness, poet
- Jacquetta Hawkes, archaeologist
- Edward Heath, later Prime Minister of the United Kingdom
- Sir Frederick Henniker, traveller
- Georgette Heyer, writer
- Ashley Hicks, interior designer and architect
- David Hicks, interior decorator and designer
- Bill Nighy, actor
- Henry Holland, architect
- Aldous Huxley, writer
- Sir Simon Jenkins, newspaper editor and author
- Edward Knoblock, playwright and author
- John Lane, publisher
- Lord Lee of Fareham, politician
- Thomas Babington Macaulay, historian and politician
- Lord John Manners, politician
- John Morgan, writer on etiquette
- Malcolm Muggeridge, journalist and broadcaster
- Sir Harold Nicolson, writer and politician
- John Hare Powel, agriculturalist and politician
- J. B. Priestley, writer
- Terence Rattigan, playwright
- Jacob Rees-Mogg, MP for North East Somerset
- John Richardson, art critic
- Baroness Pauline de Rothschild, socialite, writer, fashion designer
- Sir Roger Scruton, philosopher
- Sebastian Shaw, actor
- Michael Sherard, fashion designer
- Anthony Smith, broadcaster
- Sir Robert Smirke, architect
- Terence Stamp, actor
- Lord Stanley, politician, later 15th Earl of Derby
- Martin Stevens, politician, MP for Fulham
- William Henry Fox Talbot, pioneer photographer
- Sir David Tang, businessman
- Sir Peter Tapsell, politician
- Sir Bryan Thwaites, mathematician, educationalist, administrator
- Herbert Beerbohm Tree, actor-manager
