= John Rety =

Hungarian-British anarchist publisher (1930–2010)

- Born: Janos Réty; 8 December 1930; Budapest, Kingdom of Hungary
- Died: 3 February 2010 (aged 79); London, England
- Occupations: Poet, writer, publisher

John Rety (born Janos Réty; 8 December 1930 – 3 February 2010) was a Hungarian-British anarchist, poet, publisher and chessplayer.

== Life ==
Born in Budapest, Hungary, Rety attended an English nursery school in Budapest. A child when World War II broke out, he was separated from his Jewish parents in 1944, and carried messages for the Resistance. His grandmother was shot on the last day of the war. In 1947, after performing an anti-war play on the steps of the Budapest parliament, he left for a holiday with his aunt in Britain, and was forced to stay after the aunt burnt his passport.

After a job translating for a Czech publisher who spoke no English, he started a Soho underground paper, Intimate Review, with contributions from young writers including Doris Lessing, Bill Hopkins, Laura Del-Rivo, Frank Norman, Alun Owen, and Cressida Lindsay, while Bernard Kops. Feliks Topolski and Ralph Steadman produced artwork. In 1953 he published a comic epistolary novel, Supersozzled Nights. After the threat of libel action forced Intimate Review to close, he co-edited other short-lived publications, Cheshire Cat and Fortnightly. Rety was the first to publish Colin Wilson. He contributed the essay "So Much Work to Do" in Colin Wilson, a Celebration (Cecil Woolf,1988). This was reprinted in The Sage of Tetherdown: personal recollections of Colin Wilson by his friends, published by Paupers' Press in 2020. After meeting his partner Susan Johns in 1958, they opened a second-hand furniture shop in Camden High Street, and Rety also trained as a painter at City and Guilds Art School.

Politically involved in the anti-nuclear Committee of 100, from 1964 to 1969 he edited the anarchist weekly Freedom, increasing its circulation and smoothing over sectarianism in British anarchism with his cheerfully inclusive editorial approach. (At the time, he later confessed, he'd never read any of the anarchist classics - and though he later found Kropotkin readable, he could never really understand Proudhon or Bakunin.) He was active against the Vietnam War, participating in the Grosvenor Square demonstration as well as a 13-day fast at Speaker's Corner. Initially convinced of the innocence of Stuart Christie, accused of carrying explosives to assassinate Francisco Franco, Rety helped coordinate an international solidarity campaign, despite a personal feeling of betrayal on learning the truth.

In 1982 he co-founded the Torriano Meeting House in Kentish Town, hosting weekly poetry readings. Stephen Spender and Adrian Mitchell were among the hundreds of poets who performed at Torriano. A 2003 anthology included the work of Dannie Abse, John Arden, Oliver Bernard, John Heath-Stubbs and Dilys Wood. The anthology appeared with his Hearing Eye Press, founded in 1987, which ultimately published over 150 books. He also became poetry editor of the Morning Star: an anthology of work that appeared there, Well Versed, went into two editions.

As a chess player, reaching a FIDE rating of 2034, he played for Middlesex and London University as well as represented England in the European Senior Chess Championship. For most of his life he travelled on a stateless person's document, but finally obtained a British passport in his late seventies, after Hungary joined the EU.

Rety died in London, survived by his partner and two children: his daughter Emily Johns is editor of Peace News.
