= John Morgan (etiquette expert) =

Etiquette expert and writer from England

Anthony John Morgan (28 May 1959–9 July 2000) was an English writer and expert on etiquette.

== Early life ==
Born in Sunderland, Tyne and Wear, the son of a Scottish Shell employee, he grew up near Perth, going on to study at Cheltenham Art College, where he supplemented his maintenance grant by playing piano in a local restaurant.

== Career ==
On graduation he moved to London, and began working as assistant to the Australian fashion consultant Percy Savage. When the Gentlemen's Quarterly (GQ) was founded in 1988, Morgan was signed up as a style writer, eventually rising to become style editor.

He is perhaps best remembered for his column in The Times, "Morgan's Manners." Morgan defined good manners as the path of least offence. His Saturday column ran for three years.

Readers would write in with problems pertaining to social nuances. A typical column would see someone concerned that they were being sent generic circulars by a friend, another expressing vexation with a friend who has decided to act in an eccentric manner upon retirement and ceased replying to dinner invitations. Letters would relate to which piece of cutlery to use, and how to hold it, and proper guest-host interaction. Morgan also addressed thornier subjects such as the handing back of engagement rings and wedding presents if things did not go to plan.

Morgan was noted for informative and witty responses. The column proved very popular throughout its run.

== Other work ==
Morgan was also the author of Debrett's Etiquette and Modern Manners, published by etiquette specialists Debrett's in 1996 and republished in 1999.

== Personal life ==
Morgan dedicated himself to living the life of a Mayfair boulevardier, and lived in a flat in The Albany just off Piccadilly, which contained: 60 made-to-measure Savile Row suits; 300 monogrammed shirts; and 90 pairs of shoes. He cashed his cheques at Claridge's and was passionate about opera. Morgan was "almost certainly homosexual".

On the evening of 9 July 2000, Morgan was found dead near his home by a neighbour, having apparently fallen to his death. The coroner's verdict was open, but with a suspicion of suicide.

== Wardrobe ==
The wardrobe of The Late John Morgan, arbiter of taste and modern manners was put up for auction on 14 November 2000 at Christie's London, South Kensington, "with the hope that money will be raised to name a seat in his memory at the Royal Opera House."

This sale collected around £37,000. During this auction his full collection of George Cleverley Bespoke shoes and some others, many braces by Thurston, hats by Lock & co, slippers, a collection of ties by Turnbull & Asser and Timothy Everest, Budd shirts, silk pochettes, cashmere scarves, chamois gloves, eyewear, flannel trousers, velvet jackets, dinner suits, morning suits, top coats, a full collection of Timothy Everest bespoke suits, cases and suitcases, cufflinks, pearls, watches, a set of Montblanc fountain pens, opera glasses ...

== Publications ==
- Debrett's New Guide to Etiquette and Modern Manners (1999)
- The "Times" Book of Modern Manners: A Guide Through the Minefield of Contemporary Etiquette (2000)
