= Melbourne House =

Melbourne House may refer to:

- Melbourne House, a building on Piccadilly, London, which is now the Albany
- Melbourne House (company), a software publisher now known as Krome Studios Melbourne
- Melbourne House, an Electronic dance music genre, also known as Melbourne Bounce
