= Philip Lindsay =

Australian writer (1906–1958)

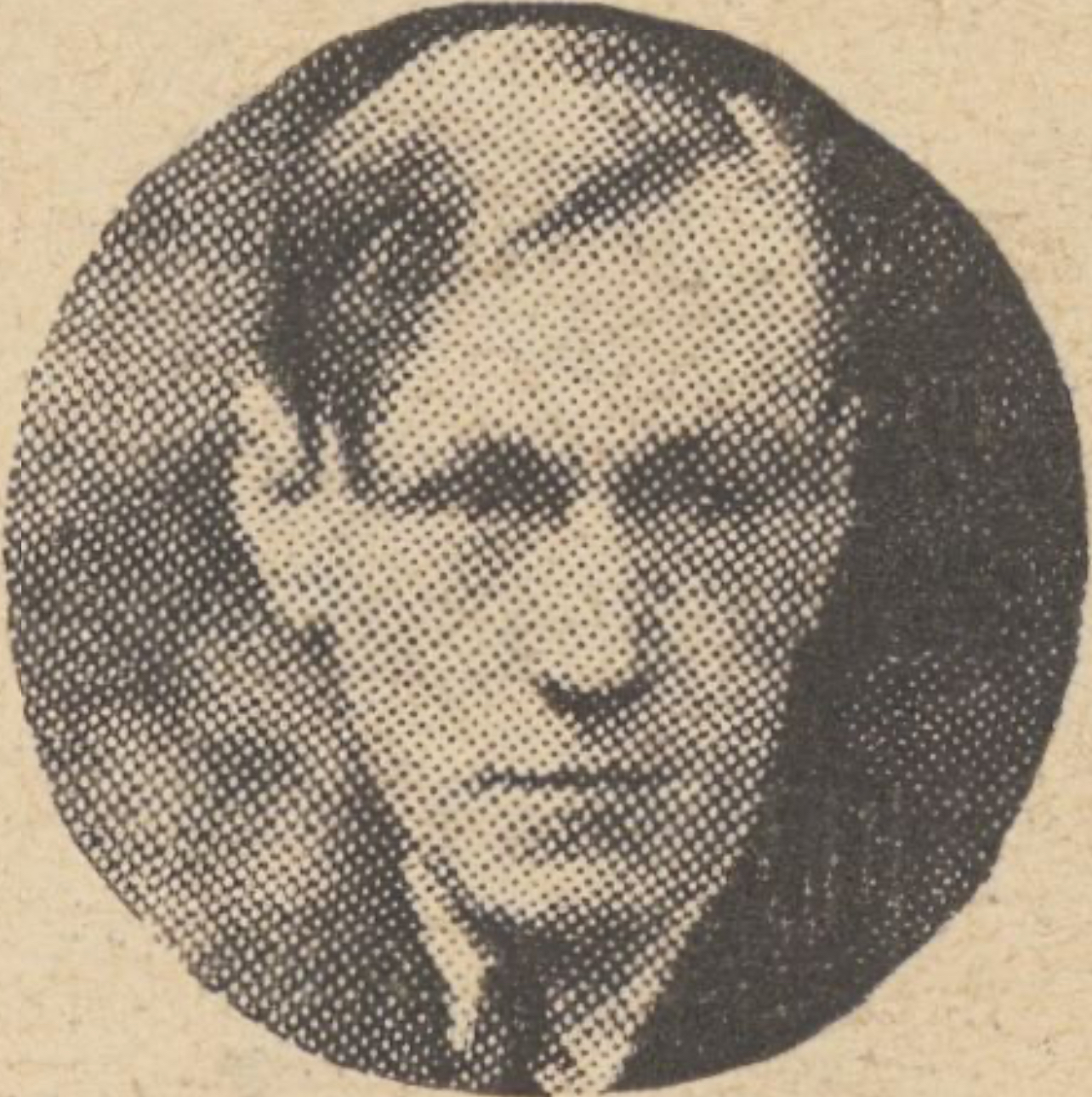
Daily Mirror, 1938

Philip Lindsay (30 April 1906 – 4 January 1958) was an Australian writer, who mostly wrote historical novels.

== Life and writing ==
He was the son of Norman Lindsay, an Australian artist and a younger brother of writer Jack Lindsay. He was educated at the Anglican Church Grammar School in Brisbane, and emigrated to England in 1929. Most of his novels were written whilst he lived in England. His daughter Cressida also became a novelist.

His novels often treated his subject matter in a dark fashion, with his central characters depicted as brooding, depressed, or disturbed characters. They include:

- The Devil and King John, influenced by Margaret Murray's The Divine King in England, claims that lying behind John's clashes with the Church was that he had leanings towards the "Old Religion" of witchcraft (see witch-cult hypothesis). His first wife Hadwisa was an actual witch, who urged him to copy William Rufus and be sacrificed at the tree. However its treatment of the better-established facts of John's reign, although ambiguous, was more sympathetic to John than most accounts e.g. it considers that there were two sides to the argument over Magna Carta. John's nephew Arthur is killed by John in a fit of temper, but he is shown as a rebellious adolescent who did provoke John to some extent rather than the innocent child in some versions. Archbishop Stephen Langton is an important character who is treated relatively sympathetically. In his introduction Lindsay acknowledged that he had no evidence that Hadwisa was a witch or that this is what happened to Arthur, but for the purposes of his plot he needed to provide a link between John and witchcraft, and this was a good a guess as any about Arthur's fate.
- One Dagger for Two, about Christopher Marlowe. In this account Marlowe is an atheist, but heterosexual. He was stabbed in a tavern quarrel, but there was a dispute over a woman behind it, it was not just a petty dispute over the bill. (The woman involved was the subject of Marlowe's poem The Passionate Shepherd to His Love.)
- They Have Their Dreams, about Perkin Warbeck. It covers only the last period of his life, starting on the eve of his landing in Cornwall, and including his time seeking sanctuary in Beaulieu Abbey. Near the end Warbeck is told that he is really the illegitimate son of Margaret of York and a clergyman.
- The Little Wench, about Sir Lancelot and Queen Guinevere and their affair.
- Here Comes the King, about Catherine Howard, Henry VIII's fifth wife.
- The Merry Mistress, about Jane Shore, mistress of Edward IV.
- London Bridge is Falling, about Jack Cade's rebellion.

He also wrote highly sympathetic biographies of Richard III of England (The Tragic King) and of Henry V of England.

In addition, he did some work for the film industry. He was one of a team of writers on Song of Freedom and Under the Red Robe, and was a technical advisor on The Private Life of Henry VIII.
