= John Kenneally =

World War II Victoria Cross winner (1921–2000)

John Patrick Kenneally
- Born: Leslie Jackson; Balsall Heath, Birmingham, England
- Military career
- Allegiance: United Kingdom
- Branch: British Army
- Service years: 1939–1948
- Rank: Sergeant
- Service number: 2722925
- Units: Honourable Artillery Company; Irish Guards; 1st Guards Parachute Battalion
- Conflicts: World War II; Palestine Emergency
- Awards: Victoria Cross

Sergeant John Patrick Kenneally (né Leslie Jackson) VC (15 March 1921 – 27 September 2000) was an English recipient of the Victoria Cross, the highest and most prestigious award for gallantry in the face of the enemy that can be awarded to British and Commonwealth forces.

== Early life ==
John Patrick Kenneally was born as Leslie Jackson at 104 Alexandra Road, Balsall Heath, Birmingham. His mother was Gertrude Nowell Robinson, the 18-year-old daughter of a Blackpool pharmacist who had been sent to live with relatives to conceal her son's illegitimate birth. She changed her surname to Jackson, and had her son christened Leslie. Kenneally subsequently understood that his mother, who became a dance hostess, and the female friend with whom she lived in Birmingham were "fairly high-class whores". Kenneally claimed that his father was a wealthy Mancunian Jewish textile manufacturer, Neville Blond, who would later become chairman of the English Stage Company and marry Elaine Marks, the Marks & Spencer heiress. Blond, despite paying maintenance, denied paternity, observing himself to have been "only one of his mother's many friends", and that he "happened to have a bob or two, which meant 'go for that fellow'".

Maintenance from Blond enabled Jackson to be initially educated at the privately run Calthorpe College. He later attended Tindal Street Junior Council School and then King Edward VI Five Ways.

== Military career ==
Jackson joined the Honourable Artillery Company on his 18th birthday. He was assigned to an anti-aircraft battery and overstayed a period of leave. He was sentenced to a period of detention at Wellington Barracks, run by the Irish Guards. He was impressed by their high standards and applied for a transfer but was rejected. Jackson deserted and joined a group of itinerant Irish labourers, eventually making his way to Glasgow. When one of them, named John Patrick Kenneally, returned to Ireland, Jackson obtained his identity card and, adopting the man's name, used it to enlist in the Irish Guards.

=== VC Details ===
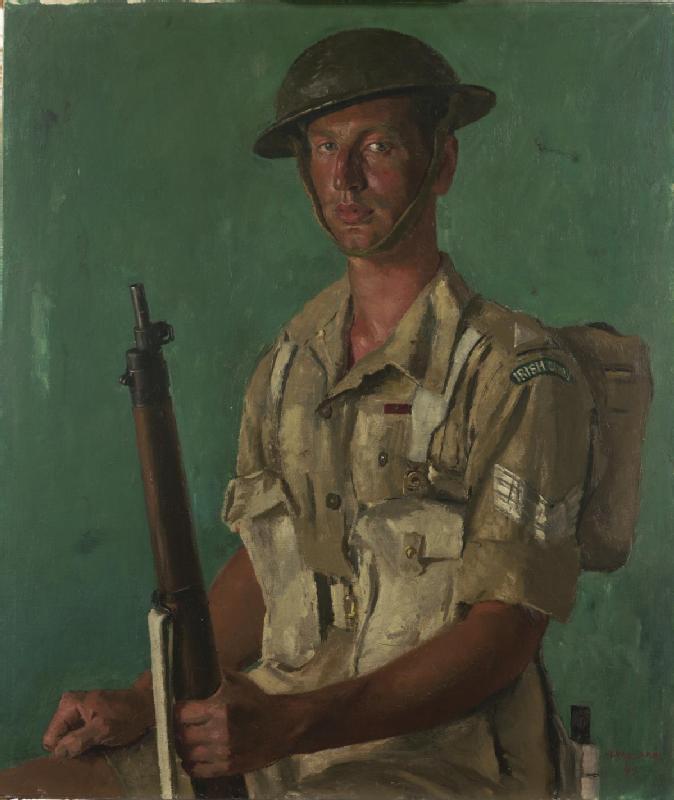
J P Kenneally, VC – 1 Battalion, Irish Guards by Henry Carr (Art.IWM ARTLD 3395)

Kenneally was a 22-year-old lance-corporal in the Irish Guards when the following deed took place for which he was awarded the VC.

On 28 April 1943 at Djebel Bou Azoukaz, Tunisia, Lance-Corporal Kenneally charged alone down the bare forward slope straight into the main body of the enemy about to make an attack, firing his Bren gun from the hip; the enemy were so surprised that they broke up in disorder. The lance-corporal repeated his exploit on 30 April when, accompanied by a sergeant, he charged the enemy forming up for assault, inflicting many casualties. Even when wounded he refused to give up, but hopped from one fire position to another, carrying his gun in one hand and supporting himself on a comrade with the other.

He was remembered in Winston Churchill's famous broadcast speech on 13 May 1945 "Five years of War", as having defended Ireland's honour:

"When I think of these days I think also of other episodes and personalities. I do not forget Lieutenant-Commander Esmonde V.C., D.S.O., Lance-Corporal Kenneally, V.C., Captain Fegen V.C., and other Irish heroes that I could easily recite, and all bitterness by Britain for the Irish race dies in my heart. I can only pray that in years which I shall not see, the shame will be forgotten and the glories will endure, and that the peoples of the British Isles and of the British Commonwealth of Nations will walk together in mutual comprehension and forgiveness."

In 1943, Kenneally had married Elsie Francis; they had two sons and a daughter. He finished his military career in the newly formed 1st Guards Parachute Battalion and later bought himself out of the army in July 1948 to be with his wife and children.

== Later life ==
Kenneally went into the motor trade after the army and remained in it for the rest of his working life, eventually operating his own garage. Reflecting on his heroic actions in Tunisia during an interview some years after the war's end, Kenneally said that he charged the Germans only because of "a strange don't-give-a-damn feeling" which had suddenly possessed him. He briefly appeared in the news again in 2000 when he published his autobiography and wrote to the Daily Telegraph rebuking Peter Mandelson for calling the Irish Guards "chinless wonders".

== The medal ==
His Victoria Cross is displayed at The Guards Regimental Headquarters (Irish Guards RHQ) in Wellington Barracks, London, England.

== Bibliography ==
- Allport, Alan (2015). Browned off and bloody-minded: the British soldier goes to war, 1939-1945. Yale University Press. pp. 243–274. doi:10.12987/9780300213126. ISBN 978-0-300-21312-6. OCLC 904281404. S2CID 246152618.
- Harvey, David (1999). "Monuments to courage". RUSI Journal. 144 (6): 91–92. doi:10.1080/03071849908446474. ISSN 0307-1847. OCLC 937293042.
- Kenneally, John Patrick (1991). Kenneally VC. Huddersfield: Kenwood. ISBN 978-0-9518237-0-5. OCLC 26722596.
- Sutton, Chris (June 2008). "The Forgotten Hero of Balsall Heath". The Balsall Heathan (276). St. Paul's Community Trust.
- The Register of the Victoria Cross. This England. 1997. ISBN 9780906324271. OCLC 609105945.
