= Morning Star (Raven novel) =

1984 novel by Simon Raven

- First edition Morning Star book cover
- Author: Simon Raven
- Language: English
- Series: First Born of Egypt
- Genre: Novel
- Publisher: Frederick Muller Ltd
- Publication date: 21 June 1984
- Publication place: United Kingdom
- Media type: Hardback and paperback
- Pages: 188 pp (hardback edition)
- ISBN: 0-85634-138-X (hardback edition)
- OCLC: 16277397
- Dewey Decimal: 823/.914 20
- LC Class: PR6068.A9 M67 1984

Morning Star is Volume I of the novel sequence First Born of Egypt by Simon Raven, published in 1984.

Set in 1977, the novel features a large cast of upper-class characters and continues the story from Raven's Alms for Oblivion novel sequence.

== Plot ==
=== Part 1: The Order of Baptism ===
1977. Lord and Lady Canteloupe celebrate the christening of their first son, Sarum, at Lancaster College.

Wealthy scholar Ptolemaeos Tunne intends to research the link between the physical brain, and the immaterial mind and soul. He attends the christening party to scout a list of youths to be test subjects in his experiments, obtaining permission from the children's parents via coercion and blackmail. At the same party, twelve-year-old Marius Stern insults his ten-year-old sister Rosie's school friend Tessa Malcolm, and Rosie retaliates by wishing bad luck on Marius at cricket in the coming year.

Old friends Fielding Gray and Maisie Malcolm own and operate Buttock's Hotel, where they live with Maisie's daughter Tessa. The hotel has recently done poor business. Maisie believes that Tessa is producing a strange “aura”, associated with adolescence, which is driving away regulars.

Publisher Gregory Stern has misgivings about allowing his children (Rosie and Marius) to participate in Tunne's experiments, but Tunne secures his consent by threatening to reveal sensitive information about Stern's ancestry. Stern's wife Isobel as well as Lord Canteloupe, both assure him that Tunne's work is reputable, and that he is to be trusted.

Undergraduates Carmilla Salinger and Jeremy Morrison discuss their invitations to participate in Tunne's experiments. The couple engage in foreplay, but not sex. Carmilla's twin sister Thea is also revealed to be in love with Jeremy. Donald Salinger, adoptive father to the twins, mulls over the recent accidental death of his wife.

=== Part 2: Gifts for the Guests ===
Rosie stays at Buttock's Hotel with Tessa while the Sterns are on vacation. Marius writes to Rosie to reveal that his cricket game has been terrible, just as Rosie had wished. Rosie writes back to assure him that her comment was made in anger, and was not to be taken seriously.

Marius begins stealing and bullying at school, and is later suspended for the term after severely attacking another boy. Gray and Canteloupe decide that, while Marius' parents are on vacation, the boy can stay with Tunne to participate in his experiments. Before leaving, Marius discloses that Tessa had coached him on how to hit someone, and had attempted to practice kissing on him, which he refused. He believes that the insulted Tessa psychically willed Rosie to put her curse on him. He asserts that a disturbing power of some kind is in possession of Tessa.

Soon Marius, Jeremy, Carmilla, and Thea are all staying with Tunne as subjects for his experiments. These involve sedating a subject, laying them in a comforting bath of water, and probing them with questions. Thea accidentally runs into Jeremy and Carmilla together and, upset at realizing that the two are involved, she decides to travel home to care for her father. Marius reveals to Tunne under sedation that he fears the power occupying Tessa intends to soon occupy him instead. Tunne attributes the story to hallucinations of the soul.

=== Part 3: The Pastime of Leviathan ===
The Sterns are abducted and held captive, while on vacation in Cyprus. Their captors blackmail Gregory into writing and publishing a damning memoir against the Israeli occupation, in exchange for their freedom.

Marius, afraid that the force occupying Tessa will shortly be coming for him, asks Jeremy, whom he trusts, to sleep in his bed as protection. That night, Marius discloses to Jeremy that he recently saw a terrifying apparition of Tessa wearing a distorted, evil expression, outside his window. Gray tells Jeremy that he believes in Tessa's innocence, and that Marius's claims must be fantasy. He returns to Buttock's Hotel, to find that the hotel's curse appears suddenly to have lifted, and business is booming. While there, Gray questions Rosie and Tessa about Marius’ supernatural claims, which the girls assure him are nonsense.

Carmilla and Thea reconcile over Jeremy, when they compare notes and agree that he has been manipulative. They determine to take their father on a vacation, as they've noticed his paranoia worsening. While they wheel him from a museum however, he is killed when a worker accidentally drops a roof tile on his head.

Tunne's efforts have led him to conclude that the human soul is left adrift after death, which disturbs him. Rosie reveals to him that the reason for Tessa's recent actions has been that Tessa (an only child), yearned for Rosie and Marius to be like siblings to her, and that when Marius refused to kiss her, she felt slighted. Rosie maliciously played along with Tessa's charade, out of jealousy of her mother's preferential treatment of Marius. She is adamant that the two girls were only toying with Marius and that nothing supernatural has happened.

Tunne summons many of the novel's characters to his home to reveal the final piece of the puzzle: Marius invented the supernatural claims about Tessa out of shame and fear of his own obsessive masturbation, itself attributed to the boy's physical discomfort due to being uncircumcised. Marius’ parents agree to a circumcision, and Lady Canteloupe laments the countless other young boys suffering the same fate in silence. Gray muses to himself that this explanation still does not address the dramatic shift in prosperity experienced by Buttock's Hotel.
