= Laura Bailey (model) =

English model and photographer

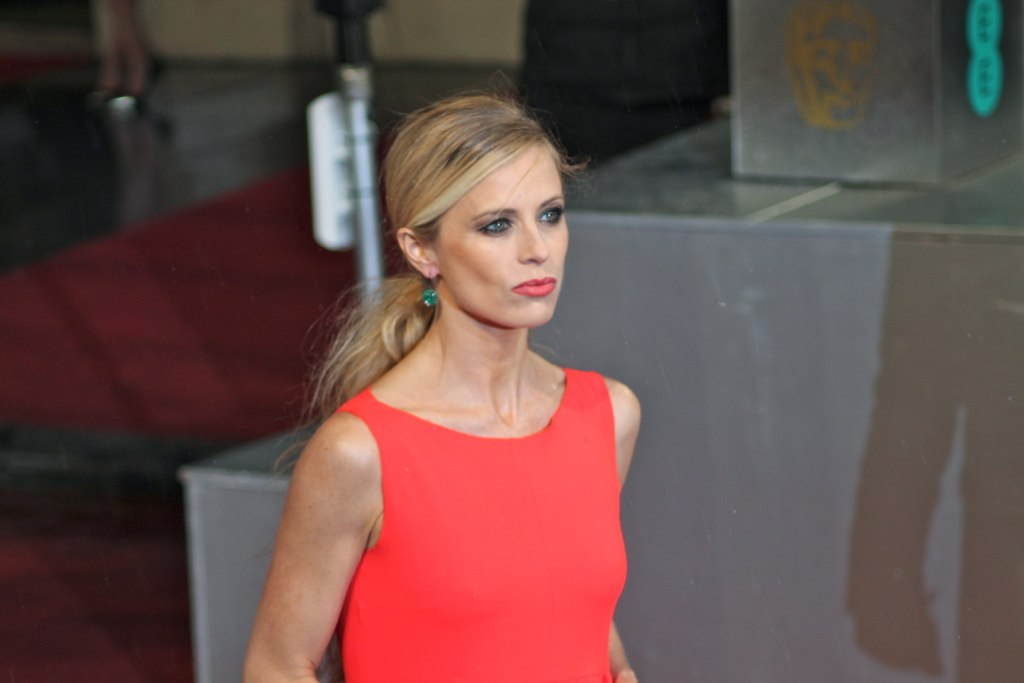
- Bailey in 2013
- Born: Laura Emily Bailey; 6 August 1972 (age 54); Oxford, Oxfordshire, England
- Education: University of Southampton
- Occupations: Model; photographer
- Partner: Eric Fellner
- Children: 2

Laura Emily Bailey (born 6 August 1972) is an English model and photographer. She has modelled for brands such as Guess, L'Oreal, Jaguar, Jaeger, and Marks and Spencer, among others.

== Early life and education ==
Bailey was born in Oxford on 6 August 1972.

She went to Wheatley Park School, and was called Laura Birks then attended the University of Southampton.

== Career ==
Bailey's most notable campaigns include Guess jeans, L'Oreal, Jaguar, Jaeger, Marks and Spencer, Bella Freud, Ray-Ban, Oetker Collection hotel, Bodas, Temperley London and Solange Azagury-Partridge. Bailey is the brand ambassador for the House of Chanel.

As a photographer her work has been published in Vogue, Violet Book, FT How To Spend It and more, alongside personal portrait and documentary projects.

Bailey has also produced and starred in a number of short films for fashion labels including Bella Freud, Solange Azagury-Partridge, Trager Delaney, and Shrimps.

In 2020 Bailey, in partnership with stylist Cathy Kasterine, collaborated with British menswear brand, Budd (shirtmakers) to create a collection of shirts and nightwear for women under the Bailey x Budd label.

== Other activities ==
Bailey also works as a writer and has written on travel and style for Vogue, Harper's Bazaar, Vanity Fair, The Independent, the FT, The Daily Telegraph and The Sunday Times. She has been a contributing editor at British Vogue. In 2010, along with a host of other celebrities, she was photographed by celebrity photographer Cambridge Jones for an exhibition opened by then Mayor of London Boris Johnson, intended to encourage people to participate in his climate change project.

She is a cultural ambassador for the British Fashion Council and an ambassador for Save The Children.
