= Cambridge Jones =

British photographer

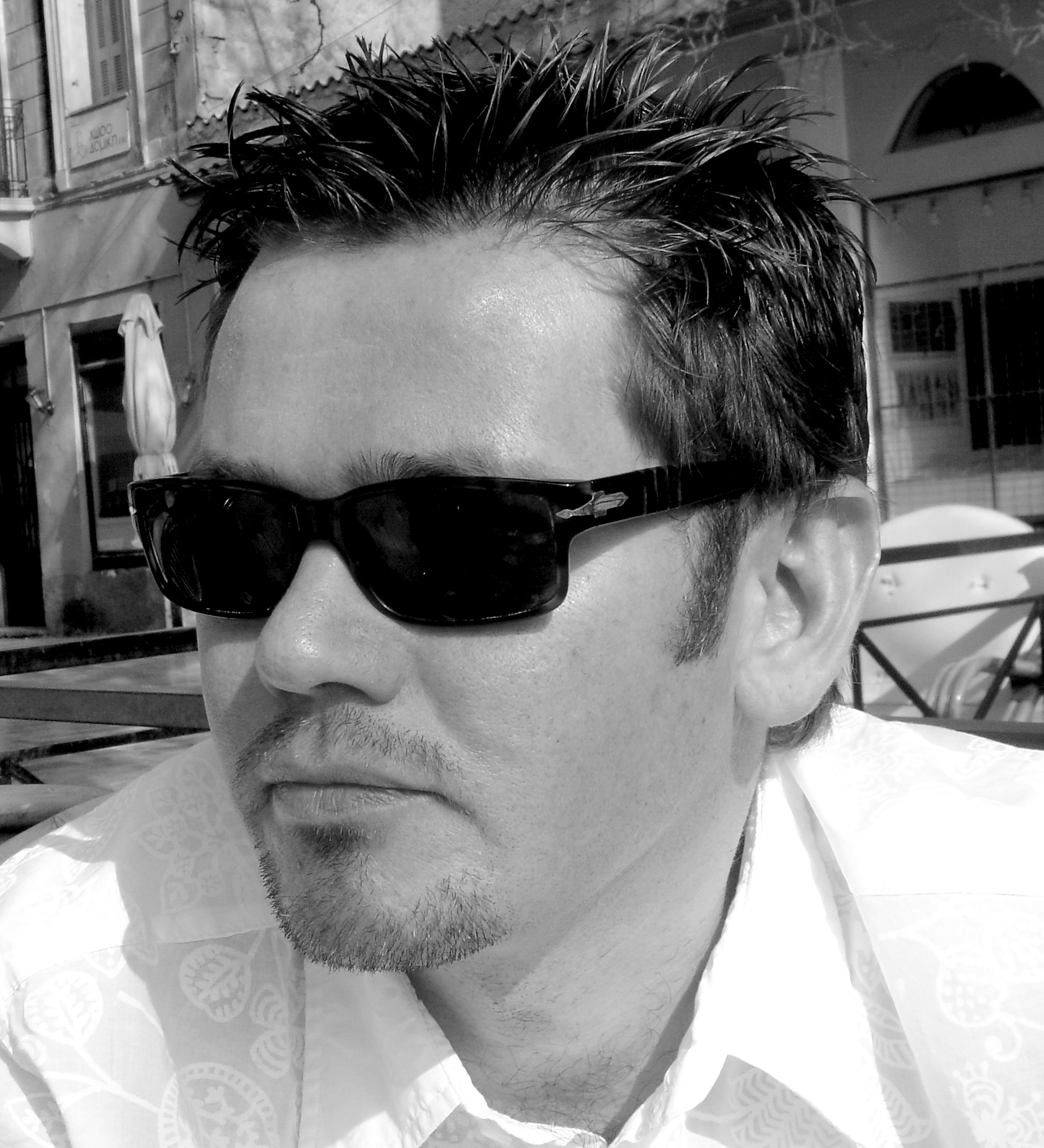
- Born: Oxford, U.K.
- Education: Christ Church, Oxford University
- Occupation: Photographer
- Website: cambridgejones.com

Cambridge Jones is a British celebrity portrait photographer from Wales. His subjects, in a series of books and exhibitions, include hundreds of well-known actors and musicians.

== Early life and education ==
Jones was adopted at the age of two. He was obsessed with photography from the age of 14, trying to convince famous people to pose for him.

He attended Christ Church at Oxford University, from 1985 to 1988, where he earned a degree in politics, philosophy and economics (PPE).

== Early jobs ==
Cambridge moved to London, starting work in market research. He established his own company whose speciality was TV focus groups. After this he set up two bars in Soho. After 10 years in London he sold up and moved to a Greek village with his family for a while.

== Career ==
His first exhibition Face The Music was held in 2004 at The Proud Galleries in London, featured pictures of 100 celebrities who chose and commented on a favourite piece of music which visitors could listen to on a pair of headphones.

In 2004 he was commissioned to create a body of work published as a book, Off Stage: 100 Portraits Celebrating the RADA Centenary, to celebrate 100 years of RADA (Royal Academy of Dramatic Art). The photographs include John Hurt, Alan Rickman, Sheila Hancock, Edward Woodward, Sir Ian Holm, Robert Lindsay, Joan Collins, Tom Courtenay, Warren Mitchell, Imelda Staunton, June Whitfield, Richard Briers, Jane Horrocks, Glenda Jackson, Juliet Stevenson, Jonathan Pryce, Kenneth Branagh, Ioan Gruffud, Susannah York, Timothy Spall, Liza Tarbuck, and Michael Kitchen.

In 2014, for the exhibition 26 Characters at The Story Museum (at the Story Museum in Oxford), Cambridge photographed 26 authors (one for each letter of the alphabet), including Philip Pullman, dressed as their favourite book characters. He also interviewed them.

In 2007 The Prince's Trust commissioned a work which was published as Inspired By Music in 2009, which was sponsored by Starbucks and on sale in every Starbucks coffee store. It features personal reflections by 36 celebrities as well as four ordinary people helped by The Prince's Trust, about musical lyrics that inspired them. Ozzy Osbourne, Take That members, Benedict Cumberbatch, and Damian Lewis are among those featured in the book. There is a foreword was written by Prince Charles and an introduction by Phil Collins, and it contains over 80 photos by Jones.

In 2008 he photographed a number of children for Barnardo's child adoption agency, in an exhibition called "Home Time", aimed at helping to find homes for hundreds of children waiting for adoption. The exhibition was held at the Getty Images Gallery in London.

In 2010 he was commissioned by then Mayor of London Boris Johnson to create an exhibition of celebrity photographs which were intended to motivate Londoners to participate in a new climate change initiative led by him. Featured in the exhibition were Vivienne Westwood, Richard E Grant, Bear Grylls, Rory Bremner, Laura Bailey, Michael Sheen, Adrian Lester, Mariella Frostrup, Jane Horrocks, Emma Thompson, Rowan Williams, and Alan Titchmarsh.

Other notable commissions include those from Nelson Mandela, and his alma mater Christ Church, Oxford. Other people photographed by Jones include South African anti-apartheid campaigners Bishop Tutu and Helen Suzman.

== Recognition ==
His work has been likened to that of famous American portrait photographer Annie Leibovitz.

In 2014 he was selected as the BBC's artist in residence and was invited by the BBC to talk on several shows.

== Exhibitions ==
=== Talking Pictures ===
Talking Pictures toured the world from 2010. It featured famous people of Welsh descent, including Anthony Hopkins, Matthew Rhys, Michael Sheen, Sian Phillips, Eddie Izzard, Rhys Ifans, Jonathan Pryce, Terry Jones, Damian Lewis, Helen McCrory, Robert Plant, Owen Sheers, Bonnie Tyler, Shirley Bassey, Emma Griffiths, David Gray, and Bryn Terfel. The exhibition locations included the Wales Millennium Centre in Cardiff; Canary Wharf lobby, London (16 September-1 October 2010); New York Public Library for the Performing Arts in the Lincoln Center (23 September – 27 November 2010); Chateau Marmont (early 2011); and the Los Angeles Municipal Art Gallery (March 2011). It was also organised by the Welsh Assembly Government to show at the British Embassy in Washington, DC; in Doha, Qatar; the British Consulate in New York; and at the Contemporary Art Gallery in Chicago. The exhibition was mounted at Canolfan Y Celfyddydau in Aberystwyth from 2 February 2013 to 13 March 2013 by the Welsh Assembly.

=== Other exhibitions ===
His work has been exhibited in galleries around the world, including:

- London - The Proud Galleries (Face The Music, 2004)
- Bologna, Italy – Portraits of Jack White and The White Stripes
- London – The Mall Galleries ‘Face Time’ with The Art Room 2014 (Bill Nighy)
- London – Mayor of London Buildings (Environmental Portraits for Boris Johnson)
- Oxford – 26 Characters at The Story Museum (2014)
- London – BAFTA portraits (Portraits from the RADA Centenary Collection used in BAFTA Awards)
- Moscow – Red Square State Museum (House of Photography) (Royal Power, Politics & Hollywood by Cambridge Jones)
- London – Saatchi Gallery (Katherine Jenkins Portrait for Great Ormond Street) (Organised by GOSH)
- London – Getty Images Gallery (The RADA Centenary Portraits)
- Brighton – Persona at the Theatre Royal (Persona Portraits)
- Nashville – Country Music Hall of Fame (Country Couture Exhibition from The Manuel Series)
- Nashville – Tinney Contemporary Gallery (The Image Makers : Manuel & Cambridge)

== Books ==
- Off Stage: 100 Portraits Celebrating the RADA Centenary, 2005 (ISBN 095468432X) with a foreword by Sir Richard Attenborough
- Christ Church – A Portrait of The House, 2007 (ISBN 1903942462)
- Inspired By Music (for the Prince's Trust), 2009 (ISBN 1907149015)
- Face The Music Printed by The Proud Gallery as a one-off catalogue
- 26 Characters (ISBN 978-0-9569918-1-2)
- Super Power Agency (ISBN 9 781838 256807)
- Fashion & Style in Photography Moscow House of Photography 2011 (ISBN 978-5-93977-062-0)

== DVD ==
- Cambridge Jones Showreel
- A Wider Sky (2005): Collaboration with composer Adrian Munsey & Cambridge Jones using photography & music
