= Neville Blond =

British industrialist (1896–1970)

Neville Blond CMG OBE (11 February 1896 - 4 August 1970) was born in Hull, Yorkshire to Bernard and Rachel Blond. He was educated at Manchester Grammar School and in Switzerland.

His career began in his family’s textile business but at the start of WW1 he joined the army. He received two decorations from the French government and reached the rank of major in the Royal Horse Guards. In 1921 he resumed his work within the family business.

In 1927, Blond married Eileen Rebecca Nahum; they had two sons; Anthony (1928–2008) and Peter (1929–2021). In 1944, he married secondly Elaine Marks, daughter of Michael Marks. John Kenneally VC (1921–2000) claimed in writing that he was an illegitimate son of Blond by Gertrude Nowell Robinson. Blond paid child support, but also doubted his paternity.

During WW2, Blond served in the RAF as a Wing commander and later was involved with activities on behalf of the Ministry of Production and the Board of Trade. Between 1948 and 1949, he was a trade adviser in the US. He returned to the family textile business in 1951.

Later, as residents of East Grinstead, he and Elaine become interested in the welfare of airmen at the local Queen Victoria Hospital and opened their home to those undergoing rehabilitation. In 1959, they donated a block of research laboratories. Further philanthropy in 1964 led to a unit for the severely burned being opened.

Blond was a patron of Royal Court Theatre and an honorary fellow of the Royal College of Surgeons. He was the first chairman of the English Stage Company, and was succeeded in that role on his death by Robin Fox and Oscar Lewenstein jointly.

Blond was appointed an MBE in 1945 and a Companion of the Order of St Michael and St George in 1950.
