= Come Like Shadows =

1972 novel by Simon Raven

- First edition (publ. Blond & Briggs)
- Author: Simon Raven
- Publication date: 1972

Come Like Shadows is Volume VIII of the novel sequence Alms for Oblivion by Simon Raven, published in 1972. It was the eighth novel to be published in The Alms for Oblivion sequence and is also the eighth novel chronologically. The story takes place in Corfu.

== Plot summary ==
Tom Llewyllyn and Somerset Lloyd-James (the latter by mistake) have been engaged to write the script of a movie version of the Odyssey, to be shot on Corfu. After some wrangling, they asked Fielding Gray to help since he is a man with knowledge of Greek and the classics in general. The shooting has many comic turns, for the movie team wanted to do a sexy story, while the foundation supplying the money demands something more radical that will substantially alter the story. Left-wing actress Sasha Grimes, who is to be the foundation's "watcher" during the shoot, suggests, for example, that Odysseus give away his land to the poor.

Gray works hard to keep the original story and even starts a sexual relationship with Grimes to be able to control her better. Max de Freville and his friend Lyki are also engaged in the movie and make visits during the shooting. They also bring Angela Tuck, suffering from terrible obesity in later years. When Angela, in a deal with Fielding, watches him having sex with Sasha, she has a heart attack and dies. Fielding, thinking about old age, is trying to blackmail producer Foxy Galahead for £50,000 to continue to keep Sasha Grimes under control. Galahead, Max, Lyki and director Jules frame Fielding, and he is arrested by Earle Restarick during a trip to Zurich. Restarick and his thugs keep Fielding prisoner in Athens and, since the film team told them another story, Restarick believes that Gray once again is digging into the things told in The Judas Boy. Restarick threatens to turn Fielding into a junkie to make him confess.

Galahead throws a Christmas party for some guests, among them Lord Canteloupe, Somerset Lloyd-James and Captain Detterling. When Galahead brags to actress Elena about how he framed Fielding, she tells the three Englishmen at the party, and they decide to rescue Fielding. Canteloupe, infuriated by the thought that an Englishman should be kept prisoner in a country of no importance (like Greece), bursts into the villa where Fielding is (officially) being nursed after a "mental breakdown" and takes him home to England. When Fielding arrives home, Harriet is not there. At peace, he begins on a number of new commissions given him by Gregory Stern.

== Characters ==
Characters are listed in the order of appearance

- Fielding Gray – A Rather successful writer and former major who has lived with Harriet Ongley in a small town on the English coast for eight years. A major character in Fielding Gray, The Sabre Squadron, Friends In Low Places, The Judas Boy and Places Where They Sing.
- Tom Llewyllyn – Writer and historian. Fellow of Lancaster College for seven years. Major character in The Rich Pay Late, Friends In Low Places, The Judas Boy and Places Where They Sing.
- Harriet Ongley – Rich widow who is the caretaker of Fielding Gray. Appeared in The Judas Boy and Places Where They Sing.
- Tessie Buttock – Hotel owner. Friend of Llewyllyn and Gray. Appeared in The Rich Pay Late, Friends In Low Places and The Judas Boy.
- Gregory Stern – Publisher. Happily married to Isobel. Appeared in Fielding Gray, The Rich Pay Late, Friends In Low Places, The Judas Boy and Places Where They Sing.
- Foxy J Galahead – Producer.
- Max de Freville – Gambler and movie financier. Appeared in The Sabre Squadron, The Rich Pay Late, Friends In Low Placesand The Judas Boy.
- Stratis Lykiadopolous – Companion of de Freville. Appeared in Friends In Low Placesand The Judas Boy.
- Jules Jacobson – Director.
- Dr LaSoeur – Doctor. Appeared in The Rich Pay Late.
- Elena – Actress.
- Gretel – Actress.
- Margaret Lichfield – Actress. Plays Penelope in The Odyssey.
- Sasha Grimes – Actress.
- Angus Carnavon – Actor. Plays Odysseus.
- Angela Tuck – Friend of de Freville. Appeared in Fielding Gray, Friends In Low Places and The Judas Boy.
- Burke Lawrence – Director. Appeared in The Rich Pay Late and Friends In Low Places.
- Earle Restarick – In the CIA. Appeared in The Sabre Squadron and The Judas Boy.
- Savidis – Co-worker of Restarick. Appeared in The Judas Boy.
- Aloysious Sheath – Co-worker of Restarick.
- Captain Detterling – MP and former soldier. Partner of Gregory Stern in the literary world. Appeared in Fielding Gray, Sound The Retreat, The Sabre Squadron, The Rich Pay Late, Friends In Low Places and The Judas Boy.
- Lord Canteloupe – Minister of Commerce. Appeared in Sound The Retreat, The Sabre Squadron, Friends In Low Places, The Judas Boy and Places Where They Sing.
- Somerset Lloyd-James – MP and associate of Lord Canteloupe. Major character in Fielding Gray, The Rich Pay Late, Friends In Low Places, The Judas Boy and Places Where They Sing.
