= Cressida Lindsay =

English poet and novelist

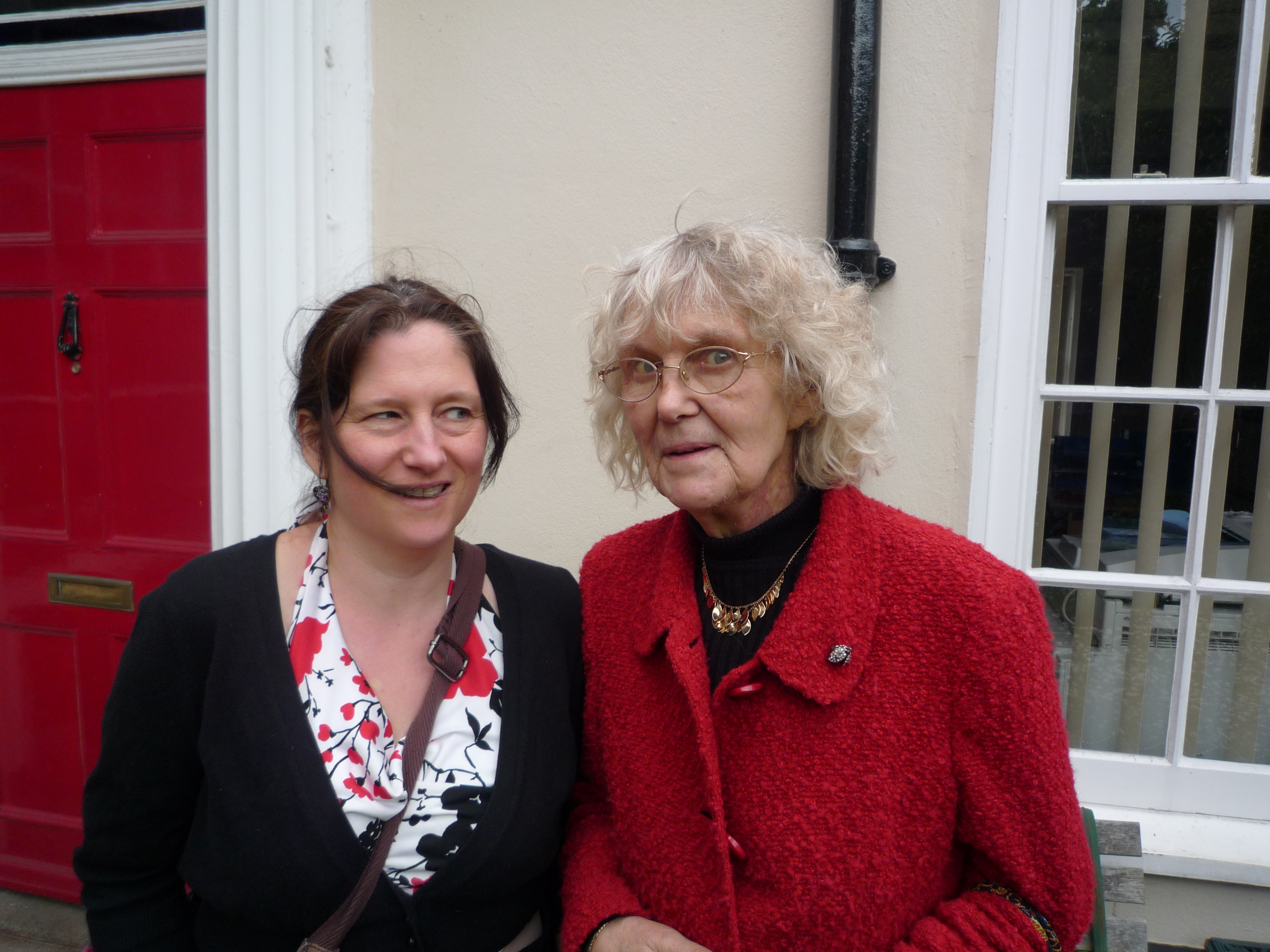
Cressida Lindsay with her youngest child, Sophie

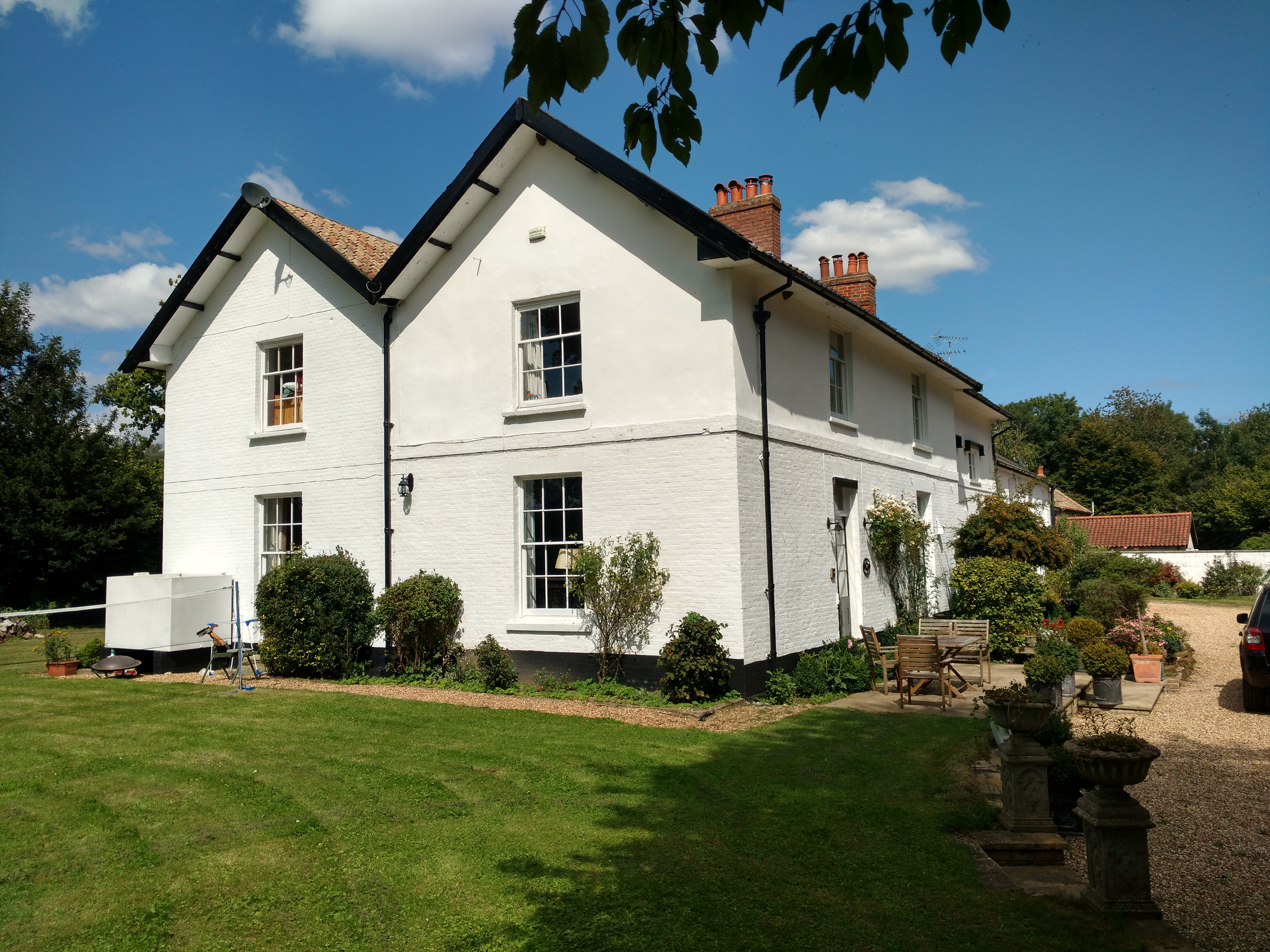
The Old Rectory

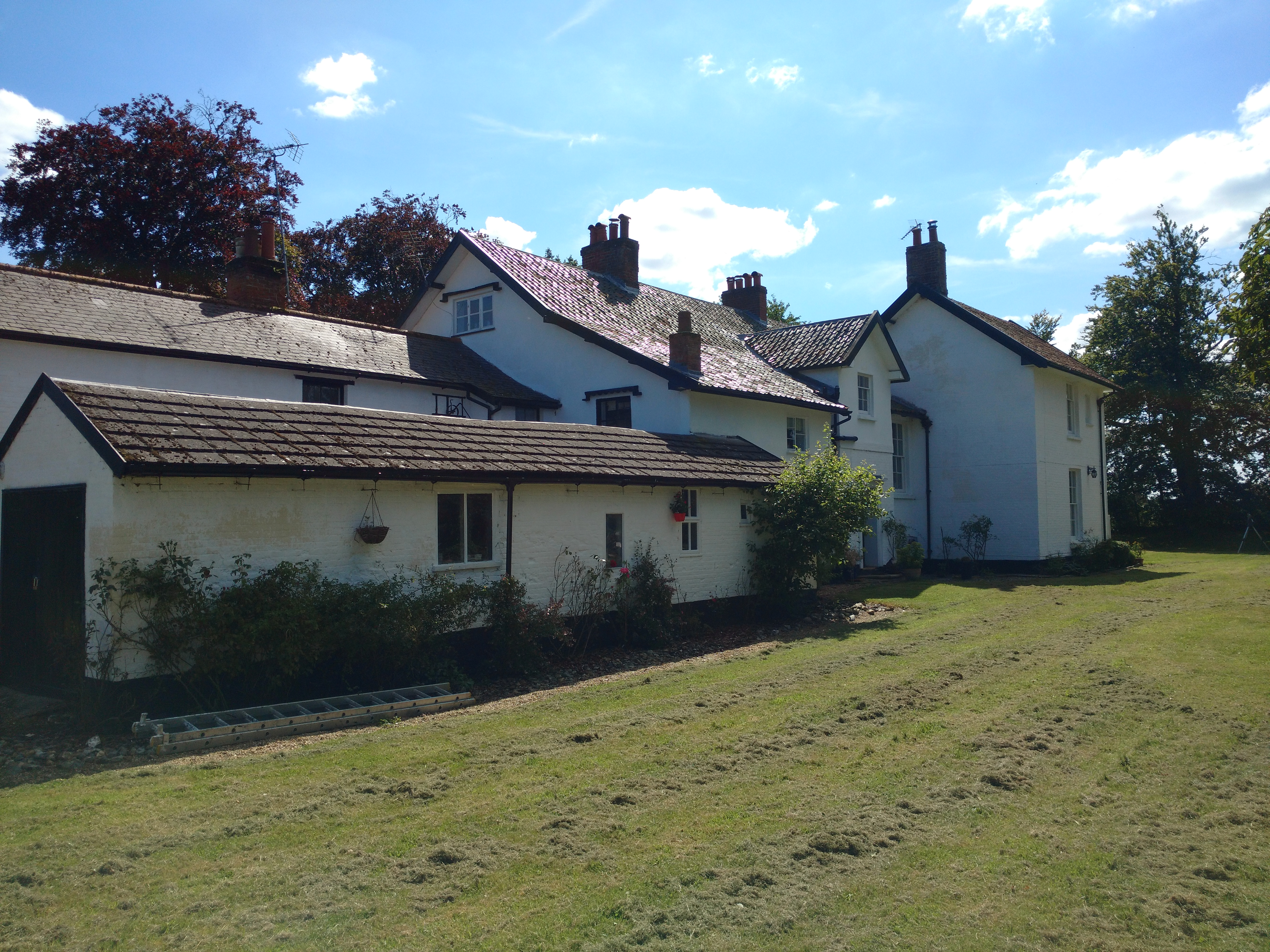
The Old Rectory

Cressida Anne Lindsay (1930 – 13 November 2010) was an English poet and novelist.

== Early life ==
Cressida Lindsay was born in London in 1930, the daughter of the writer Philip Lindsay (and a granddaughter of the Australian artist and writer Norman Lindsay) and the artist's model Jeanne Ellis. She was educated in London convents.

== Works ==
Lindsay had poems published in Michael Horovitz's New Departures.

She wrote four novels, all published in the 1960s.

- Father's Gone to War and Mother's Gone to Pieces (Anthony Blond: 1963)
- No Wonderland (New English Library: 1965)
- No, John, No (Anthony Blond: 1966)
- Lovers and Fathers (Anthony Blond: 1969)

After her death, her son Dylan Hyatt published a further novel, The Mole in the Mountain, as an e-book on Amazon (2016).

== Personal life ==
In the mid-1960s, Lindsay moved to the Old Rectory in Scoulton in Norfolk, to establish a commune for artists, one of whom was Joanna Carrington. The commune was a haven for painters, writers, sculptors, and even pop groups. This alternative lifestyle setup was documented in 1970 by John Swinfield for Anglia Television.

She married twice, to Michael Millett in 1955 and Peter Hammerton in 1988. She had a son with the poet and novelist Mark Hyatt, whom she had taught to read and write. She had another son with her publisher Anthony Blond, who bought the Old Rectory in Scoulton for her. She also had three other children.

She died in 2010, aged 80.
