= Sound the Retreat =

1971 novel by Simon Raven

- First edition cover
- Author: Simon Raven
- Language: English
- Series: Alms for Oblivion
- Genre: Fiction
- Set in: India
- Published: 1971 by Anthony Blond
- Publication place: United Kingdom
- Media type: Print
- Pages: 224 pp
- ISBN: 978-0-2185-1140-6
- OCLC: 488673
- Dewey Decimal: 823.914
- LC Class: PR6068.A9
- Preceded by: Fielding Gray
- Followed by: The Sabre Squadron

Sound The Retreat is Volume VII of the novel sequence Alms for Oblivion by Simon Raven, published in 1971. It was the seventh novel to be published in the Alms for Oblivion sequence though it is the second novel chronologically. The story takes place in India from November 1945 to June 1946.

== Plot summary ==
The story takes place between November 1945 and June 1946 in British India. Peter Morrison and his cadet comrades arrive in Bangalore for military service and are informed that they will have an Indian commander. The cadet Alister Mortleman disapproves strongly. During a visit with Captain Detterling to Ley Wong's restaurant, the Earl of Muscateer, the son of Detterling’s cousin Lord Canteloupe, gets food poisoning and later dies of Jaundice.

The cadets meet their Indian commander, Gilzai Khan, and (except for Mortleman) take a liking to him. Khan starts a sexual relationship with the cadet Barry Strange. Khan shows strong feelings during Muscateer's funeral, and later during some heavy drinking at Ley Wong’s is rebuked by Mortleman. Khan arranges an unusual duel in which Mortleman will have the advantage of youth and Khan that of experience: the men will demonstrate their sexual endurance with Ley Wong's waitresses, and the one who displays the highest number of ejaculations will win. Mortleman beats Khan by 3 – 2. Shortly after, Peter Morrison starts a relation with a prostitute, Margaret Rose Engineer.

Riots and unrest are breaking out all over India and Khan, a non-religious Muslim, predicts bloodbaths between the Hindus and Muslims when the British leave. Morrison is blackmailed by Margaret Rose who says that he promised her marriage and would have to resign his commission. Khan saves him by planting false evidence that she’s been forging ID cards at her home, and the charge against Morrison is dropped. Shortly after that Khan is removed from his command because of his positive attitude to British rule. An emotional farewell dinner for Khan is held at Ley Wong’s.

Murphy, a cadet held back in hospital for a while, is rapidly promoted to captain by chance. Morrison, Mortleman and Strange are posted to Berhampore. When they arrive, they are informed of Khan's resignation from the army without any explanation. Morrison is visited by Murphy, now working for the viceroy, who explains that Khan left the army to become a political agitator. Khan wants the British to remain in India to prevent the Hindus and Muslims from slaughtering each other. Murphy orders Morrison to “fix” the affair, i.e., kill Khan. Shortly thereafter, Khan also visits Morrison, reveals that his group will block the local railway and asks Morrison and his friends to stay away if they can. Morrison tells Khan about his own orders, and they part on friendly terms.

Very soon, Morrison, Strange and Mortleman face Khan during the action against the railway. Morrison is trying to arrest Khan but Strange and Khan have a quarrel, Strange stabs Khan with a sabre who dies congratulating Morrison on contriving his death. The men are devastated but are hailed as heroes and cleared of any charges. As they return to England, they are given news that Murphy has been killed by a car bomb.

== Characters, in the order of appearance ==
- Peter Morrison – Cadet. Major character in Fielding Gray.
- Alister Mortleman – Cadet.
- Barry Strange – Cadet.
- Miles Glastonbury – Lieutenant Colonel.
- Earl of Muscateer – Cadet, who dies after food poisoning at Ley Wong’s.
- Percy de Glanville Manwood – Officer.
- Baxter – Major.
- Betteredge – Captain.
- Lafone – Captain.
- Cruxtable – Sergeant Major.
- The Maharaja of Dharaparam – Indian prince.
- Captain Detterling – Military Instructor in Bangalore. Cousin of Lord Canteloupe. Appeared in Fielding Gray.
- Ley Wong – Chinese restaurant owner. Can provide almost anything.
- Gilzai Khan – Captain of royal descent. Secularized Muslim. Commander of the cadets in Bangalore but eventually leaves the army to agitate for continued British rule in India, to prevent Muslims and Hindus from killing each other.
- Zaccharias – Cadet.
- Murphy – Cadet who through circumstances gets repeatedly promoted.
- Lord Canteloupe – Father of the Earl of Muscateer, who dies in India.
- Lady Canteloupe – Mother of the Earl of Muscateer.
- Edwin Turbot – Politician. Makes an inspection in Bangalore.
- Margaret Rose Engineer – Prostitute who tries to blackmail Peter Morrison.
- Thomas Oakes – Adjutant.
