= Fielding Gray =

First edition (publ. Anthony Blond)

Fielding Gray is Volume IV of the novel sequence Alms for Oblivion by Simon Raven, published in 1967. It was the fourth novel to be published in The Alms for Oblivion sequence though it is the first novel chronologically. The story takes place during the period right after World War II, from May to September 1945 Fielding Gray is also the name of a character who features in this and six of the other nine volumes of the Alms for Oblivion series.

== Characters, in the order of appearance ==
Gregory Stern – Publisher who also publishes the journals of Fielding Gray.

Fielding Gray – Student and later officer in the army. The protagonist of the novel. Destroys his chances in the academic world by the seduction of Christopher Roland. Ends up in the army.

Somerset Lloyd-James – Student and social climber. A friend of Gray and Morrison. Is a candidate for the post as Head of School and succeeds when Gray has destroyed his own chances.

Christopher Roland – Student to whom Gray is attracted, though he considers him a little stupid. The seduction that follows has grave consequences when the unhappy Roland commits suicide by shooting himself.

Robert Constable – Tutor of Lancaster College. A man of high moral standing who tries to help Gray but prohibits him from entering Lancaster after he has found out about his lying to his mother and even hitting her.

Usher – Senior of the school. Gives Gray some sound advice.

Captain Detterling – Army man and former student of the school. Later MP.

Ivan Blessington – Student.

Paget – Student.

"Glinter" Parkes – Student.

Mr and Mrs Jack Gray – Jack Gray, the father of Fielding, is a bully who has inherited his money. He and his companion, Mr Tuck, are trying to shuffle away Fielding to a tea plantation of India. The father ends up in bed with young Angela Tuck but dies of heart failure when the spying Fielding slams the door. Mrs Gray seems like a rather weak woman initially but later shows a rather strong will. Just like her husband she tries to prevent the academic career of her son and have him go to India.

Mr Tuck – A huckster who drinks too much. Wants Fielding to join him in India. Married to the much younger Angela.

Angela Tuck – The young and resourceful wife of Mr Tuck. Married him for money when her father lost his. Very promiscuous.

== Plot summary ==
The story starts after the end of World War II in Europe, in May 1945, at the school that is attended by Fielding Gray and his friends. A service in memory of the dead is held and among the names mentioned is Andrew Morrison, older brother of Peter Morrison. Gray, who seems bored during the whole service, mentions early in his story that he has an affection for Christopher Roland, another boy of the school. After some flirting they meet for a tryst in a barn, after a game of cricket. Roland is disgusted with himself for climaxing too soon, and believes himself to be patronised by Gray.

People are starting to talk about their relationship and Gray doesn't really dare to see Roland again, at least not in school. He is criticised by Peter Morrison, who thinks the relationship may hurt the rather fragile Roland. Gray goes home to his parents, his bullying father and weak mother, for the school holidays. A Mr. and Mrs. Tuck are introduced to the household and we soon learn that Mr. Gray and Mr. Tuck want to send Fielding to a tea plantation in India. Fielding will, of course, hear none of this, and plans to go to Cambridge to study Latin and Greek.

He flirts with the young Mrs. Tuck, Angela, who even promises him a sexual relationship on a longer basis if he joins them in India. Fielding is also corresponding with Roland, who sends him a photograph with a dedication, which Fielding puts away in a drawer. On VJ-day in September 1945, Fielding is out in the streets and meets two sisters, Dixie and Phyllis. He fondles Dixie a bit and then runs away. When he makes a visit to Angela he hears her in the bedroom with his father, and slams the front door in fury when he leaves. On his arrival home, his mother tells him that Angela has called to tell her that his father has died of what seems to be a heart attack during a visit. Fielding suspects that it was because of the slamming of the door but he reveals nothing about the affair.

His mother inherits the modest fortune of her husband and goes away for a while. On her return she is often visited by the Tucks, who seems to become good friends. During the period she's away Fielding visits his friends and has a drunken party that ends with Lloyd-James vomiting. Later, he and Lloyd-James visit a drunk Angela Tuck, who is celebrating her 21st birthday. The party ends up with Angela and Lloyd-James having sex while Fielding leaves. The social climber Lloyd-James demands later that he should be taken more seriously by his comrades, since he is a man with ambitions. He even has plans of becoming head of school, a post that the headmaster wants to give to Gray.

Together with Peter Morrison and his father they watch horse racing, where Morrison Senior's horse Tiberius dies during the race. Peter does his National Service and is shipped away to India (described more closely in Sound The Retreat). Letters to Fielding from Christopher suggest that he is very depressed. Gray has dinner with the Tucks and things turn ugly when India comes up. Fielding visits a prostitute to find out what its like to be with a woman. During a meeting with the Headmaster Fielding is told that Christopher has been arrested for strange behaviour outside an army base. He is later informed that Christopher has shot himself with his father's gun. The friends are attending his funeral and on the way back to town the Headmaster and Gray give a lift to a soldier who also attended the service. The soldier (whose name is never revealed) was on the base where Christopher was arrested and had seen him standing outside every day for two weeks. Fielding receives a letter from Christopher, written before he killed himself, where he reveals that his tutor (whose name is not given) has told him that Fielding doesn't really love him and that this is the reason for his suicide. After this, Fielding's mother finds the photo of Christopher in the drawer and blackmails Fielding into turning down his scholarship at Cambridge. When he refuses to obey (and he even hits her) she tells the board at Cambridge and Fielding's chances are spoiled.

Senior Usher (a master at Fielding's school) is, however, prepared to pay for Fielding's education at Lancaster College, where Robert Constable will accept him. The plan is that Fielding will do his National Service and then go straight to Lancaster College. One evening, during his service, he meets Peter Morrison who tells a disturbing story. Morrison has met with Fielding's mother and told her about his plan, since he didn't think he could lie to her. The mother, furious, has done what she could to prevent the plan and has told Constable about Fielding's lies and how he hit her. Constable, who said nothing about Gray's homosexual leanings, thinks this is outrageous and refuses to accept Gray as a pupil. With all roads blocked, Gray settles for a career in the army, something that Captain Detterling, an old boy of the school, had urged on him earlier. Towards the end of the book Fielding is describing a short but bitter meeting he has had with Peter on the island of Santa Kytherea (where he is stationed) in 1955. Peter admits that Fielding Gray had become alien to him already by the end of the summer 1945.
