= Simon Raven =

British writer (1927–2001)

- Born: 28 December 1927; London, England
- Died: 12 May 2001 (aged 73); London, England
- Citizenship: British
- Occupations: Author; playwright; essayist; television writer; screenwriter
- Writing career
- Language: English

Simon Arthur Noël Raven (28 December 1927 – 12 May 2001) was an English author, playwright, essayist, television writer, and screenwriter. He is known for his louche lifestyle as much as for his literary output.

Expelled from Charterhouse School, he was commissioned in the infantry in National service, before studying at King's College, Cambridge. Unable to earn a living as a writer, he rejoined the Army, but soon resigned, rather than be court-martialled for 'conduct unbecoming', on account of his gambling debts.

Declaring that he wrote only for people who shared his own standards, he never attracted the mass market, and had to be rescued by publisher Anthony Blond, who paid him a regular wage on condition that he stayed out of London and concentrated on his writings, many of which Blond published. The arrangement lasted for over 30 years.

Raven is remembered for his ten-novel sequence Alms for Oblivion and its baroque, supernatural sequels The Roses of Picardie and September Castle; as well as The Feathers of Death, an exploratory early army novel dealing with homosexuality between officers and "other ranks". He also wrote scripts for the television drama series The Pallisers (1974) and Edward & Mrs. Simpson (1978).

== Biography ==
=== Birth, family and education ===
Born on 28 December 1927 in London, he was the eldest of three children. His father, Arthur Raven, had inherited a fortune from the family's hosiery business, and lived a life of leisure. His mother Esther, née Christmas, a baker's daughter, was a distance and cross-country athlete who represented England against France in March 1932. He was educated first at Cordwalles preparatory school near Camberley, Surrey, then as a scholarship pupil at Charterhouse, whence he was expelled in 1945 for homosexual activities. Amongst his school contemporaries were James Prior, William Rees-Mogg, Oliver Popplewell and Peter May. After completing national service he entered King's College, Cambridge, in 1948, to read classics.

Although he possessed a first-class intelligence, this was not matched by his application, and his university career was punctuated by regular crises over money, misbehaviour and an apparent inability – or, more likely, unwillingness – to connect actions with their consequences. His intelligence garnered him only an upper second, a degree which would not normally have gained him a studentship to read for a doctorate. That it did so may be attributed, essentially, to his personal charm, which gained him credit with the Fellows responsible for awarding scholarships. He was awarded a studentship (graduate fellowship) to study the influence of the classics in Victorian schooling, but this soon gave way to pleasure-seeking and his thesis was never seriously addressed. In 1951, he married Susan Kilner, a graduate from Newnham who was expecting his child; the marriage was from duty, as he made clear, and afterwards, he studiously avoided her. A son, Adam, was born in 1952. (The couple divorced in 1957.) Raven, his scholarship funds exhausted, withdrew from King's, and attempted to earn a living as a writer, gaining a small income as book reviewer for The Listener. He also wrote a novel, which proved unpublishable because of its libellous nature, and only emerged almost 30 years later as An Inch of Fortune. Seeking a firmer livelihood, Raven decided to rejoin the British Army.

=== Army ===
During his earlier National Service, Raven had briefly served as an officer cadet in the Parachute Regiment, and in 1947 was on a posting in India, during the final months of British rule there. He was subsequently commissioned into the Oxfordshire and Buckinghamshire Light Infantry, before being seconded to the 77th Heavy Anti-Aircraft Regiment, Royal Artillery at Rollestone Balloon Camp in Wiltshire, where he saw out his service. In 1953, after university, he secured a regular commission with the King's Shropshire Light Infantry (KSLI), serving in West Germany and Kenya, before receiving a home posting to Shrewsbury. It was during this period, when he was still married to Susan, that he sent his notorious telegram to her in response to her telegraphic plea for money: "Sorry no money, suggest eat baby". Such a callous response suggests that he cared nothing for his wife and child, although in fact he diligently provided for Adam's education and welfare. During his Shrewsbury posting he gambled heavily at local race meetings, and he was soon in severe financial straits following a "disastrous sequence of slow horses". Faced with the prospect of a court-martial for "conduct unbecoming" he was allowed to resign quietly, to avoid scandal in the regiment. This episode he later described with candour in Shadows on the Grass.

=== Writing career ===
At almost 30 years of age he had no career or prospects, but from his studies of the classics he had developed a lucid writing style, derived, as he said, from the Army's admirable instruction to be "brief, neat and plain". This, allied to his ready and disrespectful wit, was allowing him to survive precariously in journalism when, in 1958, he was employed by publisher Anthony Blond: "I had picked him up through Hugh Thomas who was editing a symposium for me, called The Establishment. Simon was billed to do the piece on the Army". Blond financed him while he wrote his first published novel, The Feathers of Death (1959). Blond was impressed enough to offer him a contract to continue writing for him, on condition he lived away from London, and paid off Raven's debts. "This is the last hand-out you get", he was told. "Leave London, or leave my employ". He moved to lodgings in Deal, Kent, and was paid (reportedly) a £15 wage by Blond. As a consequence of this arrangement, during the remainder of his working life, Raven became one of Britain's most prolific writers in a range of genres including fiction, essays, personal reminiscences, polemics, theatre, screenplays and magazine journalism. He was at various times compared with Evelyn Waugh, Graham Greene, Anthony Powell and Lawrence Durrell, but his voice was his own: "Raven came nearer than other novelists to exposing, in the grandeur of its squalor and the dubiety of its standards, the times he lived in and saw through". His own view of his craft was less exalted; in the words of his writer-character Fielding Gray in the novel Places Where They Sing (1970): "I arrange words in pleasing patterns in order to make money".

He had a fascination for the supernatural, first manifested in his early novel Doctors Wear Scarlet, which features Balkan vampires (though they are practitioners of vampirism as a sexual deviation rather than an actual supernatural manifestation) and was cited by Karl Edward Wagner as one of the thirteen best supernatural novels. The Gothic themes became stronger in later works such as The Roses of Picardie, September Castle, parts of the First-Born of Egypt sequence, and the 1994 novella The Islands of Sorrow.

Although he acquired an enthusiastic and loyal following, he was never a top-seller in terms of the mass market. Quoted by Brooke Allen: "I've always written for a small audience of people like myself, who are well-educated, worldly, sceptical and snobbish (meaning that they rank good taste over bad)".

His ten-novel sequence Alms for Oblivion is usually regarded as his best achievement – A. N. Wilson thought it "the jolliest roman-fleuve" – though it is likely that he gained wider public recognition for his TV work, especially the adaptation of The Pallisers (1974) and Edward & Mrs. Simpson (1978). As he grew older his rate of output lessened, and there was deterioration in its quality, but he was still being published in the late 1990s, his last book being Remember Your Grammar and Other Haunted Stories (1997), a collection of ghost and supernatural short stories.

Raven's book of anecdotes and reminiscences, Is there anybody there? said the Traveller (Frederick Muller 1990) was withdrawn after a series of libel action threats, including a writ from Anthony Blond. Thereafter he planned, or at least threatened, to write a new work All Safely Dead, in which, safe from the laws of libel, he could "expose" various deceased luminaries from the British social, academic, political and literary scenes, but the book was never written.

=== Later life ===
Throughout his life, Raven pursued a hedonistic lifestyle which included eating, drinking, travel, cricket, gambling and socialising. He spent what he earned, and after 34 years in Kent at Blond's behest he finally moved to London on securing lodgings in the London Charterhouse, the almshouse historically associated with Charterhouse School. Here he led a quieter version of his former life. In 1993, he was elected a Fellow of the Royal Society of Literature. A biography of Raven, The Captain, written by Michael Barber, was published in 1996. In 1997, he appeared with Melvyn Bragg in a South Bank Show devoted to his career, in good spirits and without regrets. His health continued to fail, however, and after a series of strokes he died in London on 12 May 2001, aged 73.

== Legacy ==
Raven's obituary in The Guardian observed that, "he combined elements of Flashman, Waugh's Captain Grimes and the Earl of Rochester", and that he reminded Noel Annan, his Cambridge tutor, of the young Guy Burgess.

Among the many things said about him, perhaps the most quoted was that he had "the mind of a cad and the pen of an angel". E. W. Swanton called Raven's cricket memoir Shadows on the Grass "the filthiest cricket book ever written". Typically, Raven's response to this was to ask Swanton's permission to quote this opinion on the book's jacket. He has also been called "cynical" and "cold-blooded", his characters "guaranteed to behave badly under pressure; most of them are vile without any pressure at all". His unashamed credo was "a robust eighteenth-century paganism ... allied to a deep contempt for the egalitarian code of post-war England".

== List of works ==
=== Novels ===
==== Early novels ====
Title	Publisher	Year
An Inch of Fortune	Anthony Blond	1980*
The Feathers of Death	Anthony Blond	1959
Brother Cain	Anthony Blond	1959
Doctors Wear Scarlet	Anthony Blond	1960
Close of Play	Anthony Blond	1962

- Note: His first novel, An Inch of Fortune, written circa 1951, was not published until 1980

==== Alms for Oblivion series ====
The 10 novels cover the period 1945 to 1973 and centre on a group of upper and upper middle class characters, forming a novel sequence, if a somewhat loosely structured one. The early novels are robust satires of the English upper set of the mid-1950s, but the later tend to a more detached and philosophical tone, becoming concerned with the occult and supernatural, and including strange happenings.

Title	Internal chronology	Publisher	Year
The Rich Pay Late	1955–56	Anthony Blond	1964
Friends in Low Places	1959	Anthony Blond	1965
The Sabre Squadron	1952	Anthony Blond	1966
Fielding Gray	1945	Anthony Blond	1967
The Judas Boy	1962	Anthony Blond	1968
Places Where They Sing	1967	Anthony Blond	1970
Sound The Retreat	1945–46	Anthony Blond	1971
Come Like Shadows	1970	Blond & Briggs	1972
Bring Forth The Body	1972	Blond & Briggs	1974
The Survivors	1973	Blond & Briggs	1976

==== The First-Born of Egypt series ====
This sequence is a continuation of Alms for Oblivion, with many of the same characters, but with storylines tending to centre on the "next generation" and the introduction of darker, mystic themes. These books were written strictly for money, and received little critical acclaim, but Raven had fun killing off many of the survivors from the earlier sequence, usually in absurd and/or humiliating circumstances.

Title	Publisher	Year
Morning Star	Blond & Briggs	1984
The Face of the Waters	Anthony Blond	1985
Before the Cock Crow	Muller, Blond & White	1986
New Seed for Old	Frederick Muller	1988
Blood of My Bone	Frederick Muller	1989
In the Image of God	Frederick Muller	1990
The Troubadour	Hutchinson	1992

==== Other novels ====
Title	Publisher	Year
The Roses of Picardie	Blond & Briggs	1980
September Castle	Blond & Briggs	1984

=== Essays, reminiscences and polemics ===
Title	Publisher	Year
The English Gentleman (see note)	Anthony Blond	1961
Boys Will Be Boys	Anthony Blond	1963
The Fortunes of Fingel	Anthony Blond	1976
Shadows on the Grass	Blond & Briggs	1982
The Old School	Hamish Hamilton	1986
The Old Gang	Hamish Hamilton	1988
Bird of Ill Omen	Hamish Hamilton	1989
Is there anybody there? said the Traveller	Frederick Muller	1990 (withdrawn)

Note: The English Gentleman was also published as The Decline of the Gentleman

=== Other writings ===
(this table is not necessarily complete)

Title	Publisher	Year
Introduction to The Best of Gerald Kersh	Heinemann	1960
Chriseis (Short Story)	No details	1960
Contribution to The Vampire (Anthology ed. Riva & Volta)	Macmillan	1963
Introductions to Trollope's "Palliser" novels	Panther Books	1973
The Islands of Sorrow (short stories)	The Winged Lion	1994
Contribution to The Vampire Omnibus ed. Peter Haining	Orion Paperbacks	1995
Remember Your Grammar and Other Haunted Stories (short stories)	The Winged Lion	1997
The World of Simon Raven (collected journalism)	Prion Humour Classics	2002

He also wrote features and articles for: The Listener; Encounter; London Magazine; Spectator; New Statesman and other magazines and journals

=== Plays, screenplays, TV and film adaptations ===
==== Selected plays ====
Title	Performance History	Publication History
Royal Foundation	No performance details	Anthony Blond, 1966*
The Move Up-Country	No performance details	Anthony Blond, 1966*
The Doomsday School	No performance details	Anthony Blond, 1966*
The Scapegoat	TV "First Night" series 1964	Anthony Blond, 1966*
Panther Larkin	No performance details	Anthony Blond. 1966*
The High King's Tomb	No performance details	Anthony Blond, 1966*
The Gaming Book	TV Armchair Theatre series, 1965	Anthony Blond, 1966*
Sir Jocelyn, The Minister Would Like a Word	TV Wednesday Play series, 1965	Anthony Blond, 1966*
The Case of Father Brendan	1968, London (no other details)	No publication details

- Royal Foundation and Other Plays, Anthony Blond 1966

==== Selected screenplays, TV and film adaptations ====
Title	Type	Year	Notes
The Scapegoat	"First Night" TV play series	1962	Adapted from own stage play
The Gaming Book	TV Armchair Theatre	1965	Adapted from own stage play
Sir Jocelyn, The Minister Would Like A Word	TV Wednesday Play	1965	Adapted from own stage play
A Soiree at Blossom's Hotel	TV Wednesday Play	1966	
A Pyre For Private James	TV Wednesday Play	1966	
Point Counter Point	TV mini series	1968	Adapted from Aldous Huxley
The Outstation	Episode of TV series	1968	Episode 11 of The Jazz Age
The Way We Live Now	TV mini series	1969	Adapted from Anthony Trollope
The Creative Impulse	TV dramatisation	1969	From W Somerset Maugham story
On Her Majesty's Secret Service	James Bond film	1969	Credited with "additional dialogue"
The Human Element	TV dramatisation	1970	From W Somerset Maugham story
Incense for the Damned (see below)	Screenplay from own novel	1970	Adapted from Doctors Wear Scarlet
Unman, Wittering and Zigo	Screenplay	1971	From Giles Cooper play
The Pallisers	TV series (26 episodes UK)	1974	Adaptation from Anthony Trollope
An Unofficial Rose	TV mini series	1974	Adaptation from Iris Murdoch
Sexton Blake and the Demon God	TV series	1976	
Edward and Mrs Simpson	TV series	1978	From book by Frances Donaldson
Love in a Cold Climate	TV mini series	1980	Adapted from Nancy Mitford
The Blackheath Poisonings	TV play	1992	Co-writer with Julian Symons

Note: The US title for Incense for the Damned was: "Bloodsuckers"

== Sources ==
- Brooke Allen: "Who Was Simon Raven?": The New Criterion, April 2003 (on https://newcriterion.com/article/who-was-simon-raven/)
- Michael Barber: "The Captain: The Life and Times of Simon Raven", Gerald Duckworth, 1996 ISBN 0-7156-2786-4
- Obituary, The Guardian, 16 May 2001 by Michael Barber
- Obituary, The Telegraph, 15 May 2001
- Obituary, The New York Times 17 May 2001 by Douglas Martin
- Obituary, The Independent 1 August 2006 obit of Adam Raven by Thomas Thirkell
- "The Gothic World of Simon Raven" at Infinity Plus
