= Budd (shirtmakers) =

- Industry: Fashion
- Founded: 1910
- Founder: Harold Budd
- Headquarters: Piccadilly Arcade, London
- Products: Luxury shirts
- Services: Bespoke tailoring
- Website: www.buddshirts.co.uk

Budd is a high-end tailor for shirts based in London's Piccadilly Arcade. Budd was founded in 1910, and is known to cater to many notable figures of British high society.

== History ==
Budd was founded in 1910 by Harold Budd as an exclusively bespoke shirtmaker. Its original premises were located in Piccadilly Arcade, adjacent to Jermyn Street. After bombing during the Blitz, Budd bought premises opposite the original store, which were the only premises in the Arcade still standing. It is now the only original member of the Arcade still operating.

In 1983, Budd was acquired by the Webster Brothers, another British shirtmaker founded in 1847.

In 2013, Budd was acquired by a group led by Stephen Murphy, former owner of Savile Row tailor H. Huntsman & Sons and board member of the Brown Thomas Group.

In 2020 Budd collaborated with model and photographer, Laura Bailey and stylist Cathy Kasterine, to create a collection of shirts and nightwear for women under the Bailey x Budd label.

== Methods and products ==
Budd is known for its highly traditional British style of shirtmaking, and is described by Spear's as demonstrating "heroic resistance to change". It is said to be the only remaining shirtmaker in England with a cutting room still above the shop. The primary Budd workshop is located in Andover.

Budd's best known pattern is the Budd Stripe, also called the Edwardian Stripe, which dates to the 1930s. It is also known for the Mess Shirt, originally made for army officers.

Today, Budd sells ready-to-wear shirts as well as providing a bespoke service. It also sells accessories including scarves, gloves, ties and collars.

== Known patrons ==
- Zac Goldsmith, politician
- Ben Goldsmith, environmentalist
- Lord Mountbatten, naval officer
- Nicky Oppenheimer, diamond tycoon
- Sir Evelyn de Rothschild, financier
- John Hurt, actor
- Edward Fox, actor

Budd's shirts have also been worn by characters in film and TV, including Matt Smith in Doctor Who and Hugh Bonneville in Downton Abbey.

Budd was referenced in the lyrics of the song the "Best of Everything" in the 1919 musical La La Lucille by George Gershwin "I go to Budd for my cravats, Stetson makes my hats. A Rolls-Royce, the best thing on wheels was my choice of automobiles".
