= Anthony Blond =

British publisher and author (1928–2008)

- Born: Anthony Bernard Blond; 20 March 1928; Sale, Cheshire, England
- Died: 27 February 2008 (aged 79)
- Education: Eton; New College, Oxford
- Spouses: Charlotte Strachey (m. 1955; div. 1960) Laura Hesketh (m. 1981)
- Children: 1
- Father: Neville Blond
- Relatives: John Strachey (father-in-law)

Anthony Bernard Blond (20 March 1928 – 27 February 2008) was a British publisher and author, who was involved with several publishing companies over his career, including several he established himself, or in partnerships, from 1952.

== Biography ==
Born in Sale, Cheshire, Blond was the elder son of Major Neville Blond CMG, OBE, who was a cousin of Harold Laski. His mother was from a Manchester Sephardic Jewish family. His parents divorced when Blond was a child and Blond was educated at Eton, where he was bullied. He briefly served national service in the Army, but growing pacifism soon led to him registering as a conscientious objector. Having gained a History exhibition (minor scholarship) to New College, Oxford, he lost it by indulging too much in the distractions of an undergraduate life: "the joys of drink, people, parties, fancy waistcoats, foreign travel and falling in love – mostly with young men."

After Oxford University, he briefly worked for a literary agent Raymond Savage, but set up his own firm in 1952, Anthony Blond (London) Ltd, in partnership with the future novelist Isabel Colegate He briefly joined Allan Wingate, but that publishing company folded in 1958, and with his own £5,000 set up a new firm.

Reported to have given the first chance to some 70 writers, Blond was particularly close to the novelist Simon Raven. Blond set up various publishing firms over the years, including Blond Educational in 1962, which he sold in 1969 to CBS, and he went into partnership with Desmond Briggs as Blond & Briggs in 1960, an informal arrangement that lasted until 1979 when Briggs retired and Harlech Television bought the company in 1979, retaining Blond as an advisor. In a management buyout Blond regained control after two years. In 1982, Blond and his new business partner, Anthony White, merged with Frederick Muller Ltd—recently acquired by Harlech Television—to form Muller, Blond & White Ltd. The publishing house Century Hutchinson absorbed this firm in 1987.

Blond was an early director and publisher of satirical magazine Private Eye. His friendship with James Goldsmith (and other members of the Clermont Club circle) survived Goldsmith's numerous writs to the magazine in the mid-1970s.

In 1955, Blond married Charlotte, the daughter of John Strachey; the marriage lasted until 1960, and Charlotte eventually married the political journalist Peter Jenkins. After a long relationship with Andrew McCall, Blond, who was bisexual, married Laura Hesketh in 1981. Blond also had a son, Aaron, by the author Cressida Lindsay.

Blond was a Labour Party candidate in Chester at the 1964 general election and was also on the executive of the National Council for Civil Liberties. His autobiography, Jew Made in England, was published in 2004.

Anthony Blond died aged 79 in hospital in Limoges, France, near the home he had shared with his wife for 25 years. Blond was described in Michael Barber's Guardian obituary as "the last of the eponymous Jewish publishers whose chutzpah made publishing hum in the days before the conglomerates".

== Book series established ==
- The Doughty Library
- The Great Society
- Handbooks to the Modern World

== Books written ==
- The Publishing Game, London: Jonathan Cape, 1971.
- Family Business, London: Andre Deutsch. 1978.
- The Book Book, London: Jonathan Cape, 1985.
- A Scandalous History of the Roman Emperors, London: Quartet Books Limited, 1994.
- Jew Made in England, London, Timewell Press, 2004.
- A Brief History of the Private Lives of the Roman Emperors, London: Robinson Publishing, 2008.
