= Sweet Adelaide =

1980 novel

- First edition
- Author: Julian Symons
- Language: English
- Genre: Historical mystery
- Publisher: Collins Crime Club
- Publication date: 1980
- Publication place: United Kingdom
- Media type: Print

Sweet Adelaide is a 1980 historical crime novel by the British writer Julian Symons. It is based on the real-life 1886 Pimlico Mystery concerning the possible murder of Thomas Bartlett by his wife Adelaide. Symons had already enjoyed success with another Victorian-set mystery The Blackheath Poisonings.

== Bibliography ==
- Bargainnier, Earl F. Twelve Englishmen of Mystery. Popular Press, 1984.
- Haste, Steve. Criminal Sentences: True Crime in Fiction and Drama. Cygnus Arts, 1997.
- Walsdorf, John J. & Allen, Bonnie J. Julian Symons: A Bibliography. Oak Knoll Press, 1996.
