= Pimlico Mystery =

1886 death of Thomas Edwin Bartlett

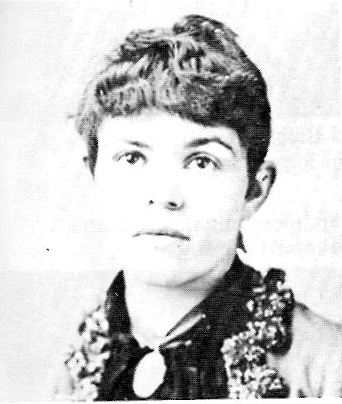
Adélaïde Bartlett

The Pimlico Mystery or the Pimlico Poisoning Mystery is the name given to the circumstances surrounding the 1886 death of Thomas Edwin Bartlett, possibly at the hands of his wife, Adélaïde Blanche Bartlett, in the Pimlico district of London.

A fatal quantity of chloroform was found in Mr Bartlett's stomach, despite having not caused any damage to his throat or windpipe, and no evidence of how it got there. Adelaide Bartlett was tried for her husband's murder and was acquitted. By the jury's own statement in court, Mrs Bartlett's acquittal was partly secured because the prosecution could not prove how Mrs Bartlett could have committed the crime.

== Background ==
At the heart of the Pimlico Mystery is the odd relationship between a wealthy grocer, Mr Thomas Edwin Bartlett (1845–1886), his younger French-born wife Adélaïde Blanche de la Tremoille (born 1855), and the Reverend George Dyson, Adelaide's tutor and the couple's spiritual counsellor and friend. Dyson was a Wesleyan minister, and (if the story Adelaide and Dyson told is true) was encouraged to openly romance Adelaide Bartlett by Edwin's permission. Edwin himself was suffering several unpleasant illnesses (including rotting teeth and possibly tapeworms). Edwin was supposedly something of a faddist, believing in animal magnetism as a key to health, but his reported eccentricities are partly based on what was learnt from Adelaide and Dyson. Adelaide's father was rumoured to be a wealthy and possibly even titled member of Queen Victoria's entourage, who had indeed visited France in 1855, possibly Adolphe Collot de la Tremouille, Comte de Thouars d'Escury.

Edwin and Adelaide were married in 1875. According to Adelaide, it was intended to be a platonic marriage, but in 1881 she had a stillborn baby by Edwin; Edwin had refused her (female) nurse's advice to call a (male) doctor during a difficult labour because he did not want another man "to interfere with her". Early in 1885, they met Dyson as the local Wesleyan minister and he became a frequent visitor. Edwin made Dyson executor of his will, in which he left his entire estate to Adelaide, on condition that she did not remarry (a common stipulation in those days). Later Edwin redrew the will, four months before he died, removing the bar on Adelaide remarrying.

Towards the end of 1885, Adelaide asked Dyson to get some chloroform that had been prescribed by the doctor treating Edwin, Dr. Alfred Leach. Leach would later admit that he prescribed it reluctantly, but at the insistence of his patient. Under the laws of the day, one had to sign a book at the chemist's pharmacy as a record of buying medical poisons, but only for large amounts; Dyson bought four small bottles of chloroform instead of one large bottle, and bought them in several shops, claiming that he needed it to remove grease stains. Only after Edwin's death did Dyson claim to suddenly realise how suspicious his actions were.

On New Year's Eve, 31 December 1885, Edwin Bartlett returned from a visit to the dentist and went to sleep alongside Adelaide in their Pimlico flat. Just before 4 am the next morning, Adelaide asked their maid to fetch Dr Leach, fearing Edwin was dead, before rousing the landlady. An autopsy was conducted on January 2 and established that Edwin's stomach was filled with liquid chloroform. Subsequent examination by a Home Office pathologist confirmed that the cause of death was chloroform poisoning. When informed of this development, Adelaide Bartlett admitted acquiring chloroform as a method of avoiding sexual intercourse with Edwin, stating that she intended to use drops of it on a handkerchief held before his face to render him unconscious. She said that she had never had cause to use the chloroform in this way, but had informed Edwin of its location the night he died. It is just possible that the stories of Edwin's alleged suicide might have been believed and his death considered free of foul play, except that his father, who had always detested Adelaide and had earlier accused her of having an affair with Edwin's younger brother, became extremely suspicious and persuaded authorities to look into the death.

An inquest under Mr A. Braxton Hicks returned a verdict of wilful murder by Adelaide Bartlett, with George Dyson being an accessory before the fact, and they were both arrested. The coroner tried to have Mrs Bartlett give evidence at the inquest because she was not permitted at that time to give sworn evidence on her own behalf at her trial, which only changed with the Criminal Evidence Act 1898.

== Trial ==
The trial opened on 12 April 1886, attracting great press coverage both in the United Kingdom and abroad. At the opening of the trial, charges were read out against both George Dyson and Adelaide, but the prosecution immediately asked for the charges against Dyson to be dropped and he was formally acquitted. This enabled the prosecution to call him as a prosecution witness, but also made it possible for the defence to take advantage of his testimony. The prosecution theorised that Adelaide had drugged her husband into unconsciousness with a small quantity of chloroform on a handkerchief before pouring a larger quantity down his throat.

Adelaide Bartlett was defended by Sir Edward Clarke, who suggested Thomas Bartlett had committed suicide. Clarke's taking on the case was rumoured to be due to Adelaide's mysterious father's intervention. The prosecution was in the hands (as was traditional in England and Wales until 1957) of the Attorney General at the time, Sir Charles Russell.

Adelaide was not able to testify in her own defence (something not possible for defendants until the Criminal Evidence Act 1898) and the defence called no witnesses, although it did give a six-hour closing statement to the court.

The main forensic aid to Mrs Bartlett is that the liquid chloroform reached the stomach without burning the sides of the throat and the larynx. Edwin did not have such burns on his body. This bolstered the suicide theory, for such rapid drinking suggested that the drinker rushed the poisoned drink down. Additionally, the prosecution's case was undermined by two of its own witnesses, Dr. Leach and George Dyson, whose testimonies both favoured the defence. When the jury returned to court after considering its verdict, the foreman said: "Although we think grave suspicion is attached to the prisoner, we do not think there is sufficient evidence to show how or by whom the chloroform was administered." The foreman then confirmed that the verdict was not guilty, which was greeted with "rapturous applause", public opinion having moved in Adelaide's favour during the course of the trial.

The issue of how the poison got into Edwin's stomach without burning him internally in the throat led the famous surgeon Sir James Paget to make his famous quip:

"Now that she has been acquitted for murder and cannot be tried again, she should tell us in the interest of science how she did it!"

== Adelaide's family ==
Adelaide was the daughter of Clara née Chamberlain (1834–1866) and her husband, known as, among other names, Adolphus Collot de Thouars d'Escury (c. 1817–1860). Clara was the daughter of Susannah née Aynsley (1805–?) and William Robinson Chamberlain (1799–1860), a Stock Exchange clerk. In 1851, she, her parents, a brother and a sister were living in Hackney, Middlesex. On 19 January 1853 at St Leonard, Hackney, she married Adolph Collot De Thouars d'Escury, widower of 85 Holywell Street. He is described as a "Pensioned Naval Officer in the French Service" and son of "Adolphe de Thouars d'Escury, Duke of Thouars".

Her husband had been married twice before:

- First on 2 December 1844 at St Luke, Finsbury, to Helena Caroline Hampton (?–1852), the daughter of Hannah née Muspratt (1785–1856) and Robert Hampton, Engineer (1777–1833). His profession was given as "Professor of Languages". Adolphus and Helena had three children:

- Walter Henry Prout d'Escury (1847–?). Emigrated to Australia where he married Sarah Ann Riley (1862–1888). Sarah left him for Edmund Duhamel, who subsequently killed her. After their separation, he appears to have gone to New Zealand, where he was imprisoned in 1891 for "larceny and uttering", and in 1893 for "larceny";
- Modestus Felix de Thouars d'Escury (1851–1851);
- Marie Helen d'Escury (1853–?), who married Louis Marie Verguet and appears to have moved to France.

- Second on 25 January 1848 at St Peter, Islington to Margaret Bearcock (1824–1886), the daughter of Margaret née Curtis (1799–1844) and John Bearcock, Brass and Iron Founder (1794–?). The marriage certificate gives his name as Henry Desbury (a variant of d'Escury) and his profession as "Lieutenant RN".

- After the wedding, "Henry" and Margaret moved to Cheltenham and "Henry Desbury a man of colour, aged 41, was charged with having, on 25 January 1848, feloniously intermarried and taken to wife Maria Margaret Bearcock, his former wife, Helena Caroline Desbury, being then alive". The court report says that "The most singular feature in the case was that the prisoner had at one time (after his alleged second marriage) been living with his second wife, the first wife also living in the same house, and being represented by the prisoner as the wife of his cousin". "Henry" and Margaret later had a son Henry William Desbury (1853–?) baptised on 12 October 1853 at St Jude, Chelsea as an "infant";
- Margaret married a second time in 1869 to Colonel David John Falconer Newall, late of the Bengal Artillery.

Clara and Adolphus had several children – brothers and sisters of Adelaide:

- Henry Edward de Thouars, born 16 March 1853 in France, baptised 14 September 1855 at St Mark, Regent's Park. The family name was De Thouars D'Escury, the address was 2 Chaleot Terrace, Regent's Park and Adolph's occupation was "Teacher of Languages". Henry later emigrated to Australia and married there;
- Adelaide herself, born 1855 in France, baptised 9 September 1856 at St Mary, Haggerston. The family name was de La Trouville De Thouars D'Escury, the address was 8 Mayfield Street, Dalston, and Adolph's occupation was "Professor of Mathematics";
- Frederick "Freddy" D'Escury, born about 1858 in France. In 1861, he was living in Havelock Terrace, Hackney, with his mother, then a "Teacher of French" and her sister;
- Clara Amelia, born 23 June 1859 in Kentish Town, in 1871 she was living in Hackney with Clara's brother William Chamberlain and his family. She died in 1873.

== Later life ==
After the trial, both Adelaide Bartlett and Reverend George Dyson vanished from public notice. The authors of The Life of Sir Edward Clarke (1939) report that they had an "impression" that Adelaide Bartlett later married George Dyson, but that they had also heard a theory that the two never met again.

The novelist Julian Symons, in his novelisation of the story Sweet Adelaide, suggested that Mrs Bartlett emigrated to the United States, settled in Connecticut, and died there some time after 1933, although others regard her post-trial life as mysterious.

== George Dyson ==
As for Dyson, Richard Whittington-Egan's study of William Roughead's life reported that a woman in Maryland claimed in 1939 that Dyson had come to New York City, United States, changed his name, and as a fortune hunter married and murdered a young bride, her sister, for her estate in 1916. Alternatively, Kate Clarke reports that Methodist church records state that Dyson emigrated to Australia.

According to John A. Vickers, researching Methodist History (2002), George Dyson emigrated to America, changed his name to John Bernard Walker and became a naturalised citizen. Initially, as a journalist, he eventually became the editor of Scientific American and wrote several books.

== Media ==
- The movie My Letter to George, or Mesmerised, with Jodie Foster was "[...] loosely based on that of Adelaide Bartlett, who, in 1886, went on trial for the chloroform poisoning of her husband".
- In the book Hitchcock/Truffaut, Alfred Hitchcock tells French New Wave filmmaker François Truffaut that he once intended to make a film about this case, but later on he dropped the idea because Truffaut's film Jules and Jim also dealt with — according to his vision — a ménage à trois. He says that one of the scenes of the picture would feature Adelaide and Dyson making violent love while Edwin Bartlett just puffs smoke out of his mouth and stares at a pipe while sitting in a rocking chair.
- The CBS radio program Crime Classics produced and aired an episode entitled "The Shockingly Peaceful Passing of Thomas Edwin Bartlett, Greengrocer" on 22 June 1953 that dramatised the story of this case for its audience with some changes to the facts.
- The case was dramatised on the radio series The Black Museum in 1952 under the title of "Four Small Bottles".
- The BBC broadcast an eight-part drama about the case as part of the TV series A Question of Guilt in 1980.

== Bibliography ==
- Bridges, Yseult, Poison and Adelaide Bartlett, ISBN 0-333-11335-7.
- Lustgarten, Ernest, Defender's Triumph (New York: Charles Scribner's Sons, 1951), Victorian Trumpets: Edward Clarke defends Adelaide Bartlett, pp. 8–80; the same essay appears in Lustgarten's The Murder and the Trial (New York: Charles Scribner's Sons, 1958), pp. 191–249.
- Sir John Hall (ed), Notable British Trials Series, The Trial of Adelaide Bartlett (Edinburgh, 1927).
- Beal, Edward, and Clarke, Edward, The Trial of Adelaide Bartlett for Murder, Held at the Central Criminal Court (1886), ISBN 978-1-4373-4233-8.
- Roughead, William, The Rebel Earl and Other Studies, (Edinburgh: W. Green & So, Limited, 1926), The Luck of Adelaide Bartlett: A Fireside Tale, pp. 215–252.
- Stratmann, Linda, Chloroform: The Quest for Oblivion, ISBN 0-7509-3098-5.
- Kate Clarke, The Pimlico Murder: Strange Case of Adelaide Bartlett (Classic crime series), ISBN 0-285-62975-1 (1990), revised 2011, ISBN 978-0-9553205-1-4.
- Storkey, Rose, "Oh Damn The Chloroform!" Adelaide Bartlett's Family of Secrets and The Pimlico Mystery" ISBN 978-1-83952-476-9 (2022).
