= The Man Who Killed Himself =

1967 novel

- First edition (UK)
- Author: Julian Symons
- Language: English
- Genre: Crime
- Publisher: Collins Crime Club (UK); Harper & Row (US)
- Publication date: 1967
- Publication place: United Kingdom
- Media type: Print

The Man Who Killed Himself is a 1967 comedy crime novel by the British writer Julian Symons.

== Synopsis ==
Sick of his life with his wealthy but domineering wife, Arthur Brownjohn creates a flamboyant alter ego for himself and enjoys life with his second identity. Pushed too far one day he decides to murder his wife in the disguise of his other persona.

== Film adaptation ==
In 1969 it was adapted into the film Arthur? Arthur! directed by Samuel Gallu and starring Shelley Winters, Donald Pleasence and Terry-Thomas.

== Bibliography ==
- Hilfer, Tony. The Crime Novel: A Deviant Genre. University of Texas Press, 2014.
- Reymond, Henry & Keating, Fitzwalter. Crime & Mystery: The 100 Best Books. Xanadu, 1987.
- Walsdorf, John J. & Allen, Bonnie J. Julian Symons: A Bibliography. Oak Knoll Press, 1996.
