= Border Patrol (American TV series) =

American adventure/drama TV series

- Starring: Richard Webb
- Country of origin: United States
- No. of seasons: 1
- No. of episodes: 39

Production
- Running time: 30 min.
- Production companies: Chris-Jane Gallu Productions, Inc.

Original release
- Network: Syndicated
- Release: March 10 – December 21, 1959

Border Patrol a/k/a U. S. Border Patrol is a 39-episode syndicated half-hour adventure/drama television series which aired in the United States during 1959, with Richard Webb cast as Don Jagger, the fictitious deputy chief of the Border Patrol. Guest actors in supporting roles include Ben Johnson, Lon Chaney Jr., Don Gordon, and Herbert Rudley

Jagger worked in various locations along the Canadian and Mexican borders, as well as by the United States coastlines, in search of illegal aliens, drug dealers, gun runners, and other law breakers. Stories were based on actual events recorded in United States Department of Justice files.

Border Patrol was sponsored by the American Oil Company / Amoco, and was seen in 60 markets. Webb made personal appearances at Amoco gas stations to help promote the television program.

== Episodes ==
No.	Title	Directed by	Written by	Original release date
1	"An Everglades Story"	Samuel Gallu	Allan Sloane	10 March 1959
A Seminole alligator wrestler helps Jagger capture illegal aliens involved in gun smuggling. Ben Johnson guest stars.
2	"The Party Line"	Unknown	Unknown	17 March 1959
Enemy agents threaten to harm the family of a foreign-born inventor unless he returns to his homeland with his inventions.
3	"A Killer Aboard"	Unknown	Unknown	24 March 1959
A dog assists Jagger in locating an escaped murderer.
4	"Passport to the Deep 6"	Alvin Rakoff	Cynthia Barratt	31 March 1959
Racketeers convince two foreigners they can enter the U. S. legally, and offer to them in for a fee.
5	"A Bundle of Dope"	D. Ross Lederman	Leonard Lee	7 April 1959
Jagger uncovers a drug peddling racket operating out of a San Diego bowling alley.
6	"Political Killer"	Unknown	Unknown	14 April 1959
Jagger goes after an international criminal who slips into the U. S. to assassinate a politician.
7	"Tide of Death"	Unknown	Unknown	21 April 1959
A refuge from a Latin American revolution is on Cape Cod writing his autobiography. Two killers kidnap his son and demand the manuscript.
8	"My Life"	Unknown	Unknown	28 April 1959
9	"Cargo Unknown"	Jean Yarbough	George Bellak	12 May 1959
Jagger heads for the Canadian border to investigate the smuggling of guns stolen from military armories.
10	"Appointment With Catastrophe"	Unknown	Unknown	19 May 1959
11	"Illicit Lottery"	Unknown	Unknown	26 May 1959
While in the Bahamas Jagger discovers a racket involving the sale of stolen lottery tickets.
12	"The Plague Trail"	Unknown	Unknown	2 June 1959
An illegal alien is not aware that he’s a typhoid carrier.
13	"The Logmen"	Richard Whorf	George Lefferts	9 June 1959
Jagger works undercover at a lumber camp on the American side of the Canadian border while investigating the transportation of illegal aliens.
14	"Rattigan and the Cat"	Richard Whorf	Peter Barry	16 June 1959
Vacationing Jagger helps Los Angeles office Bob Rattigan capture a French murderer who is afraid of cats.
15	"The Blackmail Case"	Unknown	Unknown	23 June 1959
16	"Love, Death and Diamonds"	Richard Whorf	Peter Barry	30 June 1959
A woman’s plea for help puts Jagger on the trail of a West Coast smuggling operation.
17	"Rocky Mountain Story"	Unknown	Unknown	8 July 1959
Illegal aliens set up a mining operation in an abandoned ghost town.
18	"The Pious Patsy"	Unknown	Unknown	15 July 1959
Criminals use unsuspecting people as pawns in a narcotics-smuggling operation.
19	"Rendezous in Los Angeles"	Unknown	Unknown	22 July 1959
Jagger pretends to be near death to trap a gang of smugglers.
20	"Black Sand - White Coral"	Unknown	Unknown	29 July 1959
21	"The Kwan-Yin Case"	Unknown	Unknown	11 August 1959
A stolen jade statue cases a man’s death, and is the undoing of a smuggler.
22	"The Quota Case"	Unknown	Unknown	18 August 1959
23	"Time Out"	Unknown	Unknown	25 August 1959
24	"The Homecoming"	Unknown	Unknown	1 September 1959
An exiled dying racketeer Lon Chaney Jr. sneaks back in the U. S. to visit the son he’s never seen.
25	"In a Deadly Fashion"	Samuel Gallu	Jack Paritz	8 September 1959
Jagger helps a boxer being forced to throw a fight by an illegal alien.
26	"Death in the Desert"	Samuel Gallu	Leonard Lee	15 September 1959
While in Yuma, Arizona Jagger investigates the smuggling of illegal aliens across the border.
27	"Test of Strength"	Unknown	‘	22 September 1959
28	"Night Target"	Samuel Gallu	Emmett Murphy	29 September 1959
Jagger goes to New Orleans in investigate a fishing boat charter service connected with the smuggling illegal aliens from Latin America.
29	"Case of the Cockeyed Parakeet"	Unknown	Unknown	6 October 1959
Jagger searches for the source of diseased parakeets and finds a Mexican village filled with drunk birds.
30	"Hare and Hounds"	Unknown	Unknown	22 October 1959
31	"The Vegetable Man"	Unknown	Unknown	27 October 1959
A man who smuggles Mexicans into the U.S. is involved in blackmail.
32	"The Deadman’s Float"	Unknown	Unknown	3 November 1959
Jagger poses as a criminal to infiltrate the headquarters of a smuggling ring.
33	"Terror on the Gold Coast"	Unknown	Unknown	9 November 1959
A foreigner running a crime syndicate turns to kidnapping.
34	"Lost Star"	Unknown	Unknown	17 November 1959
An enemy agent kidnaps a movie star to gain power over her husband, who is a foreign diplomat.
35	"Crime Wave at Coral Gables"	Unknown	Unknown	23 November 1959
Jagger investigates robberies in a resort colony that employs temporary servants from Canada.
36	"A Lapse of Time"	Unknown	Unknown	30 November 1959
Julio Nicklass hunts for the smuggler who let Nicklas’s brother drown.
37	"The Deadly Fool"	Unknown	Unknown	7 December 1959
Jagger tries to break up a romance between a millionaire’s daughter and a gangster.
38	"Learn to Fly"	Unknown	Unknown	14 December 1959
A student pilot is suspected of smuggling narcotics across the Mexican border.
39	"Bracero"	Unknown	Unknown	21 December 1959
