= The Plot Against Roger Rider =

1973 novel

- First edition (UK)
- Author: Julian Symons
- Language: English
- Genre: Mystery Thriller
- Publisher: Collins Crime Club (UK); Harper & Row (US)
- Publication date: 1973
- Publication place: United Kingdom
- Media type: Print

The Plot Against Roger Rider is a 1973 mystery thriller novel by the British writer Julian Symons. The novel takes place both in England and Francoist Spain. It was published in the United States by Harper.

== Synopsis ==
Geoffrey Paradine has always lived in the shadow of Roger Rider since they were at school together. Rider is now a successful business tycoon, but suspects that his attractive wife is having an affair. To his surprise it turn out that Paradine is her lover, seeking his revenge. When Rider subsequently disappears and is presume murdered, the finger of suspicion points very heavily towards Paradine.

== Bibliography ==
- Bargainnier, Earl F. Twelve Englishmen of Mystery. Popular Press, 1984.
- Miskimmin, Esme. 100 British Crime Writers. Springer Nature, 2020.
- Murphy, Bruce F. The Encyclopedia of Murder and Mystery. Springer, 1999.
- Walsdorf, John J. & Allen, Bonnie J. Julian Symons: A Bibliography. Oak Knoll Press, 1996.
