= The Broken Penny =

1953 novel

- First edition
- Author: Julian Symons
- Language: English
- Genre: Thriller
- Publisher: Gollancz
- Publication date: 1953
- Publication place: United Kingdom
- Media type: Print

The Broken Penny is a 1953 thriller novel by the British writer Julian Symons set during the early Cold War.

== Synopsis ==
After the Second World War, Professor Jacob Arbitzer rose to be president of an Eastern European country whose shape resembles a broken penny. Since overthrown by the Communists, the British government encourages him to return behind the Iron Curtain to lead an insurgency against the dictatorship. In turn, he demands he be accompanied by British former revolutionary Charles Garden.

== Bibliography ==
- Miskimmin, Esme. 100 British Crime Writers. Springer Nature, 2020.
- Reilly, John M. Twentieth Century Crime & Mystery Writers. Springer, 2015.
- Walsdorf, John J. & Allen, Bonnie J. Julian Symons: A Bibliography. Oak Knoll Press, 1996.
