= The Progress of a Crime =

1960 novel

- First edition
- Author: Julian Symons
- Language: English
- Genre: Mystery Thriller
- Publisher: Collins Crime Club
- Publication date: 1960
- Publication place: United Kingdom
- Media type: Print
- ISBN: 9781842329214

The Progress of a Crime is a 1960 mystery crime novel by the British writer Julian Symons. It was awarded the 1961 Edgar Award for Best Novel.

== Synopsis ==
Hugh Bennett, a local reporter, sees what looks like a horrible crime taking place on a village green on Guy Fawkes Night. Right in front of the bonfire, a publican is stabbed to death by a gang of young males. However, once the case comes to court, Bennett begins to have doubts about exactly what he did witness.

== Bibliography ==
- Bargainnier, Earl F. Twelve Englishmen of Mystery. Popular Press, 1984.
- Walsdorf, John J. & Allen, Bonnie J. Julian Symons: A Bibliography. Oak Knoll Press, 1996.
- White, Terry. Justice Denoted: The Legal Thriller in American, British, and Continental Courtroom Literature. Praeger, 2003.
