= The Paper Chase (Symons novel) =

1956 novel

- First edition (UK)
- Author: Julian Symons
- Language: English
- Genre: Mystery
- Publisher: Collins Crime Club (UK); Harper & Brothers (US)
- Publication date: 1956
- Publication place: United Kingdom
- Media type: Print

The Paper Chase is a 1956 mystery crime novel by the British writer Julian Symons. It was published in America the following year by Harper & Brothers under the alternative title of Bogue's Fortune. It was reviewed by fellow writers Milward Kennedy in The Guardian and Philip John Stead in the Times Literary Supplement.

== Synopsis ==
A crime writer looking for new material for his second novel, decides to set it in a progressive school and gets a job in one to help his research. Before long a murder takes place and he is drawn into an investigation about an alleged stash of treasure hidden by the school's previous headmaster, the mysterious Johnny Bogue who died in a plane crash more than a decade earlier.

== Bibliography ==
- Bargainnier, Earl F. Twelve Englishmen of Mystery. Popular Press, 1984.
- Walsdorf, John J. & Allen, Bonnie J. Julian Symons: A Bibliography. Oak Knoll Press, 1996.
- Watson, George & Willison, Ian R. The New Cambridge Bibliography of English Literature, Volume 4. CUP, 1972.
