= The Blackheath Poisonings (TV series) =

British television series

- Genre: Historical mystery
- Created by: Kenny McBain
- Based on: The Blackheath Poisonings by Julian Symons
- Written by: Simon Raven
- Directed by: Stuart Orme
- Starring: Zoë Wanamaker; Patrick Malahide; Christien Anholt
- Composer: Colin Towns
- Country of origin: United Kingdom
- Original language: English
- No. of series: 1
- No. of episodes: 3

Production
- Executive producer: Ted Childs
- Producers: Stephen Smallwood; Grace Hartley
- Running time: 60 minutes
- Production company: Central Independent Television

Original release
- Network: ITV
- Release: 7 December – 9 December 1992

The Blackheath Poisonings is a British period crime television series that originally aired on ITV in three episodes for three consecutive nights between 7 and 9 December 1992. It is an adaptation of the 1978 novel of the same title by Julian Symons.

== Cast ==
- Christine Kavanagh as Isabel Collard
- Ian McNeice as George Collard
- Zoë Wanamaker as Charlotte Collard
- Judy Parfitt as Harriet Collard
- Patrick Malahide as Robert Dangerfield
- James Faulkner as Roger Vandervent
- Christien Anholt as Paul Vandervent
- Julia St John as Beatrice Vandervent
- Nicholas Woodeson as Bertie Williams
- Ronald Fraser as Doctor Porter
- George Anton as Doctor Hassall
- Danny Schiller as Morley
- Andrew Robertson as Landlord
- Donald Sumpter as Inspector Titmarsh
- Ian Bartholomew as Jenkins
- Dafydd Hywel as Sergeant Davis
- Gabrielle Cowburn as Hilda
- Ralph Nossek as Family Solicitor
- Basil Hoskins as Napier
- Rosalind Knight as Lady Reading Poetry
- Bob Goody as Thompkins
- Douglas McFerran as Bookie's Clerk
- Lucy Briers as Maid
- Kenneth Haigh as Sir Charles Russell
- Colin Jeavons as Makepeace
- James Coyle as Chaplain
- Richard Strange as Oscar Wilde
- Robert Flemyng as Judge
- Robert Longden as Flossie
- Neville Phillips as Clerk of Court

== Bibliography ==
- Baskin, Ellen . Serials on British Television, 1950-1994. Scolar Press, 1996.
- Forshaw, Barry. British Crime Film: Subverting the Social Order. Springer, 2012.
- Tanitch, Robert. Oscar Wilde on Stage and Screen. Methuen, 1999.
