= The Immaterial Murder Case =

1945 novel Julian Symons

- First edition
- Author: Julian Symons
- Language: English
- Series: Chief Inspector Bland
- Genre: Detective mystery
- Publisher: Gollancz
- Publication date: 1945
- Publication place: United Kingdom
- Media type: Print
- Followed by: A Man Called Jones

The Immaterial Murder Case is a 1945 mystery detective novel by British writer Julian Symons. His debut novel, it was the first in a trilogy featuring the Scotland Yard detective Chief Inspector Bland. The story gently makes fun of the "Great Detective" archetype popular during the Golden Age of Detective Fiction Symons wrote the book in 1939 but didn't submit it for publication for several years during the Second World War.

== Synopsis ==
In pre-war London wealthy American John Wilson associates with a group of avant-garde artists dedicated to a new movement dubbed "Immaterialism". When a body turns up in one of the artworks, Wilson calls in his cousin the amateur detective Teak Woode who proves to be rather incompetent when compared to the more measured Chief Inspector Bland.

== Bibliography ==
- Knight, Stephen. Crime Fiction Since 1800: Detection, Death, Diversity. Macmillan, 2010.
- Walsdorf, John J. & Allen, Bonnie J. Julian Symons: A Bibliography. Oak Knoll Press, 1996.
- Woods, Tim. Who's Who of Twentieth Century Novelists. Routledge, 2008.
