= Terence Soall =

- Born: 22 March 1920; Tottenham, London, England
- Died: 10 August 2006 (aged 86)
- Occupation: Actor

Terence Soall (22 March 1920 – 10 August 2006) was an English actor who appeared in numerous television productions over a 50-year period and in over 100 films.

== Early life ==
He was born into a working-class family in Tottenham, North London. After he left school at 16 he first became a journalist with an American News Agency on Fleet Street. He then served in the Royal Air Force during World War II and was stationed in Gibraltar where he joined a theatre group. Upon his return to the UK he found work as an actor with the West Riding Theatre Company. He then made his West End debut and as an actor on stage he appeared in the original London production of Fiddler on the Roof playing the Rabbi.

== Television appearances ==
His television appearances include; Coronation Street, Anna Karenina (1977), Dixon of Dock Green (1959), The Avengers (1963), Stand Up Nigel Barton (1965) and Porridge (1975) as the prison medical officer.

== Film appearances ==
His film appearances include; Darling (1963), Georgy Girl (1966), Venom (1971), and Orlando (1992).

Soall was also the director of a drama school in Birmingham and he directed tourists in St. James's Park in his later years.

== Filmography ==
Year	Title	Role	Notes
1961	Payroll		Uncredited
1961	The Day the Earth Caught Fire	Man in Crowd	Uncredited
1964	Becket	Minor Role	Uncredited
1966	Georgy Girl	Salesman	
1967	Theatre of Death	Ferdi	
1971	Venom	Lutgermann	
1981	Lady Killers	Dr. John Morton	Episode: "The Darlingest Boy"
1992	Orlando	Third Butler	
1994	Beg!	Dr. Ruden	
