= A Three-Pipe Problem =

1975 novel

- First edition
- Author: Julian Symons
- Language: English
- Genre: Detective
- Publisher: Collins Crime Club
- Publication date: 1975
- Publication place: United Kingdom
- Media type: Print
- Pages: 223
- Followed by: The Kentish Manor Murders

A Three-Pipe Problem is a 1975 mystery detective novel by the British writer Julian Symons. A pastiche of the original Sherlock Holmes stories by Arthur Conan Doyle, it takes place in the present day. The title refers to a line spoken in The Red-Headed League, referring to a particularly tricky problem that will take Holmes the time it takes to smoke three pipes to solve. It was followed by a sequel The Kentish Manor Murders.

== Synopsis ==
Overbearing and reactionary actor Sheridan Haynes has a fascination with Sherlock Holmes, and is cast to play him in a new television series. Overidentifying with the role he sets out to investigate three murders that Scotland Yard have failed to solve.

== Bibliography ==
- Bargainnier, Earl F. Twelve Englishmen of Mystery. Popular Press, 1984.
- Caserio, Robert L. The Cambridge Companion to the Twentieth-Century English Novel. Cambridge University Press, 2009.
- Reilly, John M. Twentieth Century Crime & Mystery Writers. Springer, 2015.
