= The 31st of February (novel) =

1950 novel

- First edition
- Author: Julian Symons
- Language: English
- Genre: Mystery crime
- Publisher: Gollancz
- Publication date: 1950
- Publication place: United Kingdom
- Media type: Print

The 31st of February is a 1950 mystery crime novel by British writer Julian Symons. It was his fourth published novel following a trilogy featuring Chief Inspector Bland. It further continued the author's toying with the Great Detective type of the classic model during the Golden Age of Detective Fiction. The investigating officer in a potential murder case, Inspector Cresse, is far from flattering portrayed.

== Synopsis ==
When the wife of advertising agency executive Anderson is found dead, police suspect murder begin to hound Anderson into admitting his guilt.

== Bibliography ==
- Bargainnier, Earl F. Twelve Englishmen of Mystery. Popular Press, 1984.
- Walsdorf, John J. & Allen, Bonnie J. Julian Symons: A Bibliography. Oak Knoll Press, 1996.
