= The Belting Inheritance =

1965 novel

- First edition
- Author: Julian Symons
- Language: English
- Genre: Mystery
- Publisher: Collins Crime Club
- Publication date: 1965
- Publication place: United Kingdom
- Media type: Print
- Pages: 192
- ISBN: 0333484371

The Belting Inheritance is a 1965 mystery detective novel by the British writer Julian Symons. It is a traditional country house mystery harking back towards the Golden Age of Detective Fiction. It was republished by British Library Publishing in 2018 along with another Symons novel The Colour of Murder.

== Plot ==
At her country estate of Belting, Lady Wainwright mourns the loss of two of her sons in the Second World War many years before. One day a stranger turns up at the house claiming to be her missing son David, who rather than being killed has spent years in a Soviet prisoner-of-war camp. He now claims his rightful inheritance, the manor of Belting. Her remaining children are concerned that this apparent "impostor" is going to receive the entire inheritance.

== Bibliography ==
- Walsdorf, John J. & Allen, Bonnie J. Julian Symons: A Bibliography. Oak Knoll Press, 1996.
- Watson, George & Willison, Ian R. The New Cambridge Bibliography of English Literature, Volume 4. CUP, 1972. ISBN 0521085357.
