= Venom (1971 film) =

1974 British horror film by Peter Sykes

- American theatrical release poster
- Directed by: Peter Sykes
- Screenplay by: Donald Ford; Derek Ford additional dialogue Christopher Wicking
- Based on: an original story by Stephen Collins
- Produced by: Michael Pearson; Kenneth F. Rowles
- Starring: Simon Brent; Neda Arnerić; Sheila Allen
- Cinematography: Peter Jessop
- Edited by: Stephen Collins
- Music by: John Simco Harrison
- Production companies: Cupid Productions; Action Plus Productions
- Distributed by: Cupid Productions
- Release date: 2 May 1974 (UK)
- Running time: 90 minutes
- Country: United Kingdom
- Language: English

Venom (also known as The Legend of Spider Forest, and Spider's Venom) is a 1974 British horror film directed by Peter Sykes and starring Simon Brent and Neda Arnerić .

== Plot ==
On holiday in Bavaria, Paul Greville meets a girl in a forest. He later finds out she is Anna, and she has a spider-shaped mark on her shoulder. The locals believe she is the "spider goddess" responsible for several violent deaths. It later emerges that Anna's father, Dr. Lutgermann, is a Nazi war criminal who has developed a deadly nerve drug based on spiders' venom. He created the legend of the spider goddess as a cover for his killing of intruders. Paul and Anna escape while Lutgermann, attacked by deadly spiders released by Anna, accidentally sets fire to his house. Anna rushes back to try to save him.

== Cast ==
- Simon Brent as Paul Greville
- Neda Arnerić as Anna
- Sheila Allen as Ellen
- Derek Newark as Johann
- Terence Soall as Lutgermann
- Gerard Heinz as Huber
- Gertan Klauber as Kurt
- Sean Gerrad as Rudi
- Bette Vivian as Frau Kessler
- Ray Barron as young man
- Billy Reid as gang member
- George Fisher as gang member
- Nosher Powell as gang member

== Production ==
Peter Sykes said when he was asked to make the film a script already existed. Sykes rewrote the script and the producers told him he had changed it too much from the original, which had received financial backing. So it changed it back while keeping some changes.

It was his directorial debut. "The film looked beautiful," said Sykes, saying he was influenced by Sunrise. The film led to Hammer Films offering him Demons of the Mind (1972).

Filming took place in October 1970 at Twickenham Studios and on location. Peter Sykes called it "more of a romantic fantasy with horror overtones. It touches on the genre I’m most interested in, which is the psychological horror story – Cat People [1942] and films like that. It’s a kind of comic strip myth."

== Home media ==
The film was released on DVD by Cav Distributing Corporation on 31 January 2006, as a part of a double-feature alongside God Told Me To (1976). It was later released by W Video on 2 May 2017 under its alternate name Spider's Venom.

== Critical reception ==
The Monthly Film Bulletin wrote:

For a film which spends so much time, effort and style on mystification, Venom gives rather too much of the game away in an ill-advised and arty pre-credits sequence (all dancing sunlight and reflections on the water) which does sterling service later for minatory flashbacks ... Simon Brent and Neda Arneric are quite personable and perform very adequately, and Peter Sykes brings off several sequences of nicely sustained menace (though he does tend to destroy the carefully built-up atmosphere by obtrusive zooms at climactic moments), but it all seems like much ado about very little. Too many mysterious flutterings, feral cries and nocturnal threats, not to mention buzzing electrical saws, brandished axes and murderous villagers, tend to steal too much venom from the spiders who are supposed to be the villains.

Time Out London gave the film a mixed review, criticizing the film's script as being "full of holes", but commended the film's "tautly visual" action, and imaginative direction.

Dave Sindelar of Fantastic Movie Musings and Ramblings gave the film a negative review, criticizing the film's confusing plot, "jagged" direction, and poor camerawork.
