= Bland Beginning =

1949 novel

- First US edition
- Author: Julian Symons
- Language: English
- Series: Chief Inspector Bland
- Genre: Detective mystery
- Publisher: Gollancz (UK); Harper & Brothers (US)
- Publication date: 1949
- Publication place: United Kingdom
- Media type: Print
- Preceded by: A Man Called Jones

Bland Beginning is a 1949 mystery detective novel by British writer Julian Symons. It is the third and final novel in his trilogy featuring the Scotland Yard detective Chief Inspector Bland. It features Bland before he became a policeman, becoming involved in his first ever case.

== Synopsis ==
When he buys his fiancée an engagement present of a first edition set of poems, a young man finds himself mixed up in a case of forgery and blackmail. To aid him he calls in the assistance of his friend Bland.

== Bibliography ==
- Bargainnier, Earl F. Twelve Englishmen of Mystery. Popular Press, 1984.
- Stevenson, W. B. Detective Fiction. Cambridge University Press, 2013.
- Walsdorf, John J. & Allen, Bonnie J. Julian Symons: A Bibliography. Oak Knoll Press, 1996.
