= Georgy Girl =

1966 film directed by Silvio Narizzano

- Promotional film poster
- Directed by: Silvio Narizzano
- Written by: Margaret Forster; Peter Nichols
- Based on: Georgy Girl by Margaret Forster
- Produced by: Robert A. Goldston; Otto Plaschkes
- Starring: James Mason; Alan Bates; Lynn Redgrave; Charlotte Rampling
- Cinematography: Kenneth Higgins
- Edited by: John Bloom
- Music by: Alexander Faris
- Color process: Black and white
- Production company: Everglades Productions
- Distributed by: Columbia Pictures
- Release dates: 17 October 1966 (USA); 21 October 1966 (UK)
- Running time: 99 minutes
- Country: United Kingdom
- Language: English
- Budget: $400,000
- Box office: $16.8 million

Georgy Girl is a 1966 British romantic comedy film directed by Silvio Narizzano and starring Lynn Redgrave, Alan Bates, Charlotte Rampling, James Mason, and Rachel Kempson (Redgrave's mother). The screenplay was written by Margaret Forster and Peter Nichols, based on the Forster's 1965 novel of the same name. The film tells the story of a virginal young woman (Redgrave) in 1960s Swinging London, who is faced with a dilemma when she is pursued by her father's older employer (Mason) and the young lover of her promiscuous, pregnant flatmate (Rampling).

The film premiered at the 16th Berlin International Film Festival, where it was nominated for the Golden Bear. It was released in the UK by Columbia Pictures on October 21, 1966. Grossing $16.8 million, Georgy Girl was a box-office success, and it also spawned a hit theme song. It was nominated for four Oscars at the 29th Academy Awards, including Best Actress for Redgrave and Best Supporting Actor for Mason. It was also nominated for four BAFTA Awards, including Best British Film. Redgrave also won the Golden Globe Award for Best Actress in a Motion Picture – Musical or Comedy.

== Plot ==
Georgina "Georgy" Parkin is a 22-year-old Londoner who has musical talent, is well-educated, and has an engaging, unpretentious character. She has an inventive imagination and loves children. Overweight, Georgy believes herself to be plain, dresses haphazardly, and is incredibly naïve about love and flirtation, having never had a boyfriend. Her parents are live-in servants of businessman James Leamington, who is in a loveless, childless marriage with the sickly Ellen.

Leamington watched Georgy grow up, treating her like a second father, but as she has become a young woman, his feelings for her have become more than fatherly. He urges Georgy's father to make her appreciate all he has done for her over the years, including paying for her expensive education. For his 49th birthday, Leamington sends Georgy a stylish but understated cocktail dress to wear to his party, which her father encourages her to attend. Aware of Leamington's inappropriate interest in her and her father’s complacency, Georgy sarcastically asks her father whether the dress came from "my other daddy, the rich one." Instead of the dress Leamington has sent, Georgy shows up at the party in a garish sequin gown and long scarf, with an extravagantly teased coiffure topped with a feather, and with heavy stage makeup; she performs a bawdy burlesque number ("Whole Lotta Woman") in front of his guests. Serving as butler, her father is embarrassed, but Leamington is delighted by the performance, taking Georgy into the privacy of his office. There Leamington offers Georgy a legal contract, proposing to provide her the luxuries of life in return for her becoming his mistress. Georgy sidesteps his proposal.

Georgy's flatmate, the beautiful Meredith, is a violinist in an orchestra. While Meredith is out on dates with other men, Georgy entertains Meredith's boyfriend, Jos Jones, on whom Georgy has developed a crush. When Meredith discovers that she is pregnant by Jos, they decide to get married, even though she tells him that she has previously aborted two of his children and only wants to marry because she is "bored". After the wedding, Jos moves in with Meredith and Georgy, becomes disillusioned with Meredith, and finds himself attracted to the good-natured Georgy. Meanwhile, although Georgy uses Leamington's interest in her to convince him to buy several expensive items for the baby, and Ellen dies suddenly, Georgy does not sign Leamington's contract.

In the midst of an argument with Meredith over her cavalier attitude to her pregnancy, Jos kisses Georgy and declares that he loves her. Georgy flees the apartment, and Jos follows her into the streets of London, shouting his love for her. The two return to the flat, where they have sex, after which Peggy, a neighbour, tells Jos that Meredith has gone into labour, and he and Georgy go to the hospital. Although Georgy feels guilty, she continues her affair with Jos while Meredith is in the hospital. Having no interest in her daughter, Sara, and tired of Jos, Meredith announces that she plans to put the baby up for adoption. When Georgy sees Sara, she is smitten, and Meredith says that Georgy can keep the baby "gratis" before taking off with a boyfriend.

Georgy and Jos bring Sara back to the flat. It quickly becomes clear that Georgy cares more for the baby than for Jos; their relationship ends when Jos tires of a father's responsibilities, abandoning Georgy and his baby. Now that Georgy is the sole caregiver of a child to whom she has no blood ties, Social Services wish to remove Sara from her care.

Leamington has been following the developments in Georgy's life. When he suggests modifying his contract to accommodate recent changes, Georgy seizes the opportunity to keep Sara and get him to propose marriage. As the newlyweds are chauffeured from the church on their wedding day, Georgy ignores Leamington, devoting all her attention to Sara.

== Cast ==
- Lynn Redgrave as Georgina "Georgy" Parkin
- James Mason as James Leamington
- Alan Bates as Jos Jones
- Charlotte Rampling as Meredith Montgomery
- Bill Owen as Ted Parkin
- Clare Kelly as Doris Parkin
- Rachel Kempson as Ellen Leamington
- Denise Coffey as Peg
- Penny Spencer as Kate
- Dorothy Alison as Health Visitor
- Peggy Thorpe-Bates as Hospital Sister
- Dandy Nichols as Hospital Nurse
- Terence Soall as Salesman
- Jolyon Booth as Registry Office Clerk
- Alison Glennie as Bridesmaid

== Production ==
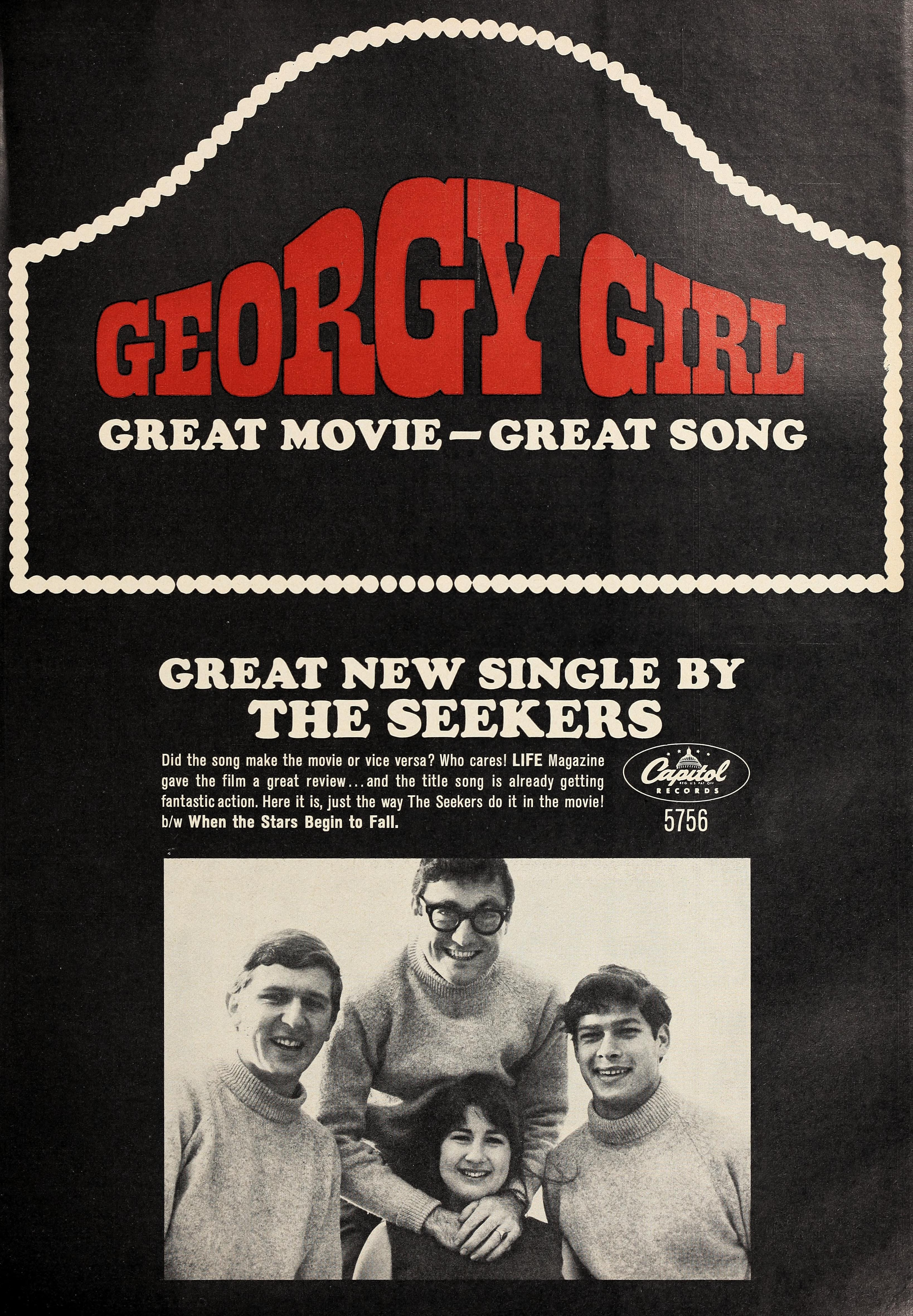
Cashbox advertisement for the title song (November 26, 1966)

=== Locations ===
Several of the film's scenes were filmed in north London, in Belsize Park and Little Venice, notably outside a canalside house on Maida Avenue.

=== Title song ===
The title song, written by Tom Springfield and Jim Dale, was recorded by Australian band The Seekers. A single release of the song (with different lyrics) topped the singles chart in Australia, and was a top 10 hit in both the UK (No. 3) and the U.S. (No. 2 for two weeks). It was the 56th biggest British hit of 1967, and the 57th biggest American hit of 1967. The song became a gold record, and it was nominated for the 1966 Academy Award for Best Music, Original Song.

== Reception ==
=== Box office ===
The film was successful at the box office. By 1967, it had earned an estimated $7 million in the United States and $6 million in other countries. By the end of 1967, it had earned $7,330,000 in North America in rentals accruing to the distributors.

=== Critical reception ===
Bosley Crowther wrote in The New York Times: "Georgy Girl is a striking example of what could only be achieved with a uniquely right performer in the crucial rule. ... The screenplay is generously spangled with truly wonderful throwaway lines, delicious plot surprises and lovely quirks of character."

Variety wrote: "Miss Redgrave has a pushover of a part, and never misses a trick to get that extra yock, whether it's her first passionate encounter with Alan Bates or her fielding of Mason's amorous overtures. She's consistently on target, and hits the bullseye all along the line. Mason adeptly displays that wealth is an important factor in getting one's girl. Bates makes a breezy lover and husband, though the scene in which he pursues his quarry through London, stripping on the way, is rather way out, Charlotte Rampling is fine as the attractive, bitchy flat mate, Bill Owen and Rachel Kempson [sic] add effective contributions as the parents. A lively score, brisk editing and excellent lensing, contribute to a well-made commercial picture."

British film critic Leslie Halliwell said: "Frantic black farce which seemed determined to shock, but has a few good scenes once you get attuned to the mood. A censorship milestone."

The Monthly Film Bulletin wrote of the film: "Another swinging London story filled with people running through London late at night, dancing madly in the rain, and visiting deserted children's playgrounds to ride on the roundabouts. In style a poor imitation of various 'new wave' exercises, it has a slick line in repartee which amuses at first until its shallowness becomes apparent. The continual jokes about Georgy's size, for example, tend to pall after numerous repetitions. Nor does the film have much continuity. It proceeds in triangular jerks from scene to scene, linked tenuously and loudly by continuous snatches of music to keep the action going. The potentially excellent cast and the promising comedienne talent of Lynn Redgrave can do little in the face of such opposition from both script and direction."

The Radio Times Guide to Films gave the film four stars out of five, writing: "At the time a sexual showstopper, this can now be seen as an unconscious parody of Swinging Sixties chic. It is saved from mere shock novelty by Lynn Redgrave's performance as the dowdy girl pursued by older employer James Mason, who finds her own identity looking after the illegitimate baby of flatmate Charlotte Rampling. Former TV director Silvio Narizzano piles on the tricks of cinematic trendiness, but it's the acting that stabilises the story into something memorable from a boringly self-conscious era."

On the review aggregator website Rotten Tomatoes, 82% of 11 critics' reviews are positive.

=== Awards and nominations ===
Award	Category	Nominee(s)	Result	Ref.
Academy Awards	Best Actress	Lynn Redgrave	Nominated	
Academy Awards	Best Supporting Actor	James Mason	Nominated	
Academy Awards	Best Cinematography – Black-and-White	Kenneth Higgins	Nominated	
Academy Awards	Best Song	"Georgy Girl"; Music by Tom Springfield; Lyrics by Jim Dale	Nominated	
Berlin International Film Festival	Golden Bear	Silvio Narizzano	Nominated	
Berlin International Film Festival	OCIC Award	Silvio Narizzano	Won	
British Academy Film Awards	Best British Film	Silvio Narizzano	Nominated	
British Academy Film Awards	Best British Actress	Lynn Redgrave	Nominated	
British Academy Film Awards	Best Art Direction – Black-and-White	Tony Woollard	Nominated	
British Academy Film Awards	Best Cinematography – Black-and-White	Kenneth Higgins	Nominated	
Directors Guild of America Awards	Outstanding Directorial Achievement in Motion Pictures	Silvio Narizzano	Nominated	
Golden Globe Awards	Best English-Language Foreign Film		Nominated	
Golden Globe Awards	Best Actor in a Motion Picture – Musical or Comedy	Alan Bates	Nominated	
Golden Globe Awards	Best Actress in a Motion Picture – Musical or Comedy	Lynn Redgrave	Won	
Golden Globe Awards	Best Original Song – Motion Picture	"Georgy Girl"; Music by Tom Springfield; Lyrics by Jim Dale	Nominated	
Golden Globe Awards	Most Promising Newcomer – Male	Alan Bates	Nominated	
Golden Globe Awards	Most Promising Newcomer – Female	Lynn Redgrave	Nominated	
Kansas City Film Critics Circle Awards	Best Actress	Lynn Redgrave	Won (Note: Tied with Vanessa Redgrave for Camelot.)	
Laurel Awards	Top Drama		Nominated	
Laurel Awards	Top Song	"Georgy Girl"; Music by Tom Springfield; Lyrics by Jim Dale	Nominated	
National Board of Review Awards	Top Ten Films		6th Place	
New York Film Critics Circle Awards	Best Actress	Lynn Redgrave	Won (Note: Tied with Elizabeth Taylor for Who's Afraid of Virginia Woolf?.)	

== Adaptations in other media ==
The film was the basis for a 1970 Broadway musical titled Georgy.

In 1992, it was dramatised in 6 parts for BBC Radio 4 by Joe Dunlop.

In 2013, it was adapted for BBC Radio 4 by Rhiannon Tise.
