= Arthur? Arthur! =

1969 British film by Samuel Gallu

- Opening titles
- Directed by: Samuel Gallu
- Written by: John Esmonde; Simeon George; Bob Larbey
- Based on: The Man Who Killed Himself by Julian Symons
- Produced by: E.M. Smedley-Aston; Ted Weiner
- Starring: Shelley Winters; Donald Pleasence; Terry-Thomas; Tammy Grimes
- Cinematography: Brian Probyn
- Edited by: Peter R. Hunt
- Music by: Harry Robertson
- Release date: October 1969
- Running time: 94 minutes
- Country: United Kingdom
- Language: English

Arthur? Arthur! is a 1969 British comedy film directed by Samuel Gallu and starring Shelley Winters, Donald Pleasence and Terry-Thomas. It was written by John Esmonde, Simeon George and Bob Larbey based on the 1967 novel The Man Who Killed Himself by Julian Symons. According to the British Film Institute (BFI), the film was not theatrically released in the UK, but obtained a US release in 1975.

== Plot ==
A dull and unsuccessful inventor begins to develop a second identity as a man about town with a completely different life.

== Cast ==
- Shelley Winters as Hester Green
- Donald Pleasence as Arthur Brownjohn / Sir Easonby 'E' Mellon
- Terry-Thomas as Clennery Tubbs
- Tammy Grimes as Lady Joan Mellon
- Rafiq Anwar as majordomo
- Judith Arthy as Patricia Parker
- Michael Bates as Mr Harrington
- Peter Bayliss as Doctor Hubble
- Joan Benham as Mrs Payne
- Mike Carnell as postman
- Erik Chitty as Uncle Ratty
- Margaret Courtenay as Clare Brownjohn
- Frank Crawshaw as dustman
- Mark Eden as Jack Parker
- Robin Ellis as Ames
- Angela Grant as Cynthia
- Basil Henson as Coverdale
- Raymond Huntley as George Payne
- Stanley Lebor as analyst
- Garry Marsh as golfer
- Keith Marsh as Lillywhite
- Harry Shacklock as attendant
- Jeffrey Sirr as water boy
- Patsy Smart as Miss Bonnamie
- Oliver Tobias as Peter 'Bobo' Jackson
- Margery Withers as Susan
- Victor Brooks as minor part

== Reception ==
The British Film Institute wrote: "Donald Pleasance [sic] is excellent as a nervous, bald, hen-pecked – and murderous – inventor leading a strange double life as a hirsute playboy running an introductions agency in this strange and often bewildering late 1960s comedy. Terry-Thomas also excels as a charming con-man, enlivening this piquant forgotten 1969 period piece – never released in UK cinemas."
