= The End of Solomon Grundy =

1964 novel

- First edition (UK)
- Author: Julian Symons
- Language: English
- Genre: Crime
- Publisher: Collins Crime Club (UK); Harper & Row (US)
- Publication date: 1964
- Publication place: United Kingdom
- Media type: Print

The End of Solomon Grundy is a 1964 crime novel by the British writer Julian Symons. The title refers to a line in the nursery rhyme Solomon Grundy.

== Synopsis ==
The body of a young woman is found in a mews in Mayfair, police at first believe she is a prostitute. Superintendent Manners comes to believe she was actually murdered in a new suburban housing estate known as The Dell where advertising man Solomon Grundy lives.

== Bibliography ==
- Bargainnier, Earl F. Twelve Englishmen of Mystery. Popular Press, 1984.
- Stade, George & Karbiener, Karen. Encyclopedia of British Writers, 1800 to the Present, Volume 2. 2010.
- Walsdorf, John J. & Allen, Bonnie J. Julian Symons: A Bibliography. Oak Knoll Press, 1996.
- Winks, Robin W. & Corrigan, Maureen. Mystery and Suspense Writers: The Literature of Crime, Detection, and Espionage, Volume 2. Charles Scribner's, 1998.
