= Theatre of Death =

1967 British film by Samuel Gallu

- Theatrical release poster
- Directed by: Samuel Gallu
- Written by: Ellis Kadison; Roger Marshall
- Produced by: E. M. Smedley-Aston (producer); William J. Gell (executive producer)
- Starring: Christopher Lee; Julian Glover; Lelia Goldoni
- Cinematography: Gilbert Taylor
- Edited by: Barrie Vince
- Music by: Elisabeth Lutyens
- Production company: Pennea Productions Ltd.
- Distributed by: London Independent Producers (UK); Hemisphere Films (US)
- Release date: 1967
- Running time: 91 minutes
- Country: United Kingdom
- Language: English

Theatre of Death (also known as Blood Fiend) is a 1967 British horror movie directed by Samuel Gallu and starring Christopher Lee, Lelia Goldoni and Julian Glover. It was written by Ellis Kadison and Roger Marshall.

== Plot ==
Philippe Darvas is a theatre director whose Grand Guignol theatre is thought to be linked to a series of murders.

== Cast ==
- Christopher Lee as Philippe Darvas
- Lelia Goldoni as Dani Gireaux
- Julian Glover as Charles Marquis
- Ivor Dean as Inspector George Micheaud
- Joseph Furst as Karl Schiller
- Steve Plytas as Andre, patron of cafe
- Betty Woolfe as Colette
- Leslie Handford as Joseph
- Miki Iveria as patron's wife
- Fraser Kerr as Pierre
- Dilys Watling as Heidi
- Lita Scott as voodoo dancer
- Evelyn Laye as Madame Angelique
- Jenny Till as Nicole Chapelle
- Terence Soall as Ferdi
- Esther Anderson as La Poule
- Peter Cleall as Jean, stage manager
- Suzanne Owens as girl on scooter
- Julie Mendez as belly dancer
- Evrol Puckerin as voodoo dancer
- The Tony Scott Drummers as voodoo drummers

== Critical reception ==
The Monthly Film Bulletin wrote: "A secret panel in the fireplace, a stone chamber with cobwebs, and a darkly cloaked figure are among the time-honoured stratagems employed in this concoction which flirts coyly with the occult, hypnotic control and vampirism. None of these trappings disguise the fact that the material is routine, and the story loses momentum after its colourfully unconvincing Théatre de Mort opening. Still, there is some recompense in the stylish pictorial effects."
