= The Kentish Manor Murders =

1988 novel

- First edition
- Author: Julian Symons
- Language: English
- Genre: Detective
- Publisher: Macmillan
- Publication date: 1988
- Publication place: United Kingdom
- Media type: Print
- Pages: 191
- ISBN: 0140108726
- Preceded by: A Three-Pipe Problem

The Kentish Manor Murders is a 1988 mystery detective novel by the British writer Julian Symons. A pastiche of the traditional Sherlock Holmes stories by Arthur Conan Doyle, it is a sequel to the 1975 novel A Three-Pipe Problem.

== Plot ==
Sheridan Haynes, now famous for playing Holmes in a series of television adaptations, is invited to Castle Baskerville by Warren Waymark to perform some scenes in character. The eccentric millionaire Waymark, a fanatical Sherlockian, is a collector of anything related to the detective. Before his visit, Haynes is approached by a man claiming to have a genuine copy of previously unknown original Doyle story which he wants to sell to Waymark.

== Bibliography ==
- Reilly, John M. Twentieth Century Crime & Mystery Writers. Springer, 2015. p. 300. ISBN 0312824181. OL 4437992M.
- Watt, Peter Ridgway; Green, Joseph (2017) [2003]. The Alternative Sherlock Holmes: Pastiches, Parodies and Copies. Routledge. ISBN 978-0754608820.
- Walsdorf, John J. & Allen, Bonnie J. Julian Symons: A Bibliography. Oak Knoll Press, 1996.
