= The Colour of Murder =

1957 novel by Julian Symons

- First edition
- Author: Julian Symons
- Language: English
- Genre: Crime
- Publisher: Collins Crime Club
- Publication date: 1957
- Publication place: United Kingdom
- Media type: Print
- Pages: 224
- ISBN: 1464210896

The Colour of Murder is a 1957 crime novel by the British writer Julian Symons. It was awarded the Gold Dagger of the Crime Writers' Association for that year. It was republished by British Library Publishing in 2018 along with another Symons novel The Belting Inheritance.

== Plot ==
Unhappily married John Wilkins meets Sheila, an attractive young librarian. He fantasises about killing his wife, so he can leave her and start a new life with Sheila.

== Bibliography ==
- Walsdorf, John J. & Allen, Bonnie J. Julian Symons: A Bibliography. Oak Knoll Press, 1996.
