= Give 'em Hell, Harry! =

1975 film by Steve Binder, Peter H. Hunt

- Theatrical release poster
- Directed by: Steve Binder; Peter H. Hunt (stage production)
- Written by: Samuel Gallu
- Produced by: Bill Sargent; Joseph E. Bluth
- Starring: James Whitmore
- Cinematography: Ken Palius
- Edited by: Steve Binder
- Music by: Pearl Kaufman
- Production companies: Permut Presentations; Theatrovision
- Distributed by: Theater Television
- Release date: September 18, 1975
- Running time: 104 minutes
- Country: United States
- Language: English
- Budget: $230,000
- Box office: $11,000,000 or $4 million

Give 'em Hell, Harry! is a biographical play and 1975 film, written by playwright Samuel Gallu. Both the play and film are a one-man show about former President of the United States Harry S. Truman. Give 'em Hell, Harry! stars James Whitmore, and was directed by Steve Binder and Peter H. Hunt.

== Title origin ==
The title comes from an incident that took place during the 1948 presidential election campaign. In Bremerton, Washington, Truman delivered a speech attacking the Republicans. During the speech, a supporter yelled out, "Give 'em Hell, Harry!" Truman replied, "I don't give them Hell. I just tell the truth about them, and they think it's Hell." Subsequently, "Give 'em Hell, Harry!" became a lifetime slogan for Truman supporters.

== History ==
The play previewed in Hershey, Pennsylvania, followed by its official opening at Ford's Theatre in Washington, D. C. Its April 17, 1975, premiere was hosted by Truman's daughter Margaret, and attended by President Gerald Ford. The play then went on to a six-city tour, during which it was videotaped for film on the stage of the Moore Theatre in Seattle, using a live editing process called Theatrovision. It was also recorded and released by United Artists Records.

Although the play has been regularly revived, it did not make its New York debut until July 2008 at St. Luke's Theatre. Clifton Truman Daniel portrayed his grandfather in the title role in several performances in 2023.

== Accolades ==
Award	Category	Nominee	Result	Ref.
Academy Awards	Best Actor	James Whitmore	Nominated	
Golden Globe Awards	Best Actor in a Motion Picture – Drama	James Whitmore	Nominated	
Grammy Awards	Best Spoken Word Recording	James Whitmore	Won	

Give 'em Hell, Harry! is only the third film to have its entire credited cast (Whitmore) nominated for an Oscar, the first two being Who's Afraid of Virginia Woolf? in 1966, for which almost all members excluding the extras were nominated, and Sleuth in 1972.
