= A Man Called Jones =

1947 novel

- First edition
- Author: Julian Symons
- Language: English
- Series: Chief Inspector Bland
- Genre: Detective mystery
- Publisher: Gollancz
- Publication date: 1947
- Publication place: United Kingdom
- Media type: Print
- Preceded by: The Immaterial Murder Case
- Followed by: Bland Beginning

A Man Called Jones is a 1947 mystery detective novel by British writer Julian Symons. It is the second novel in his trilogy featuring the Scotland Yard detective Chief Inspector Bland. Symons was critical of the "Great Detective" that features in so many novels during the Golden Age of Detective Fiction and demonstrates this in the climatic scene where Bland assembles all the suspects to explain his theory, only to first send them to sleep and then be confronted by the late arrival of a previously unknown character on which the whole puzzle hinges.

== Synopsis ==
Lionel Hargreaves, son of the founder of Hargreaves Advertising Agency, is shot dead during a noisy office party.

== Bibliography ==
- Bargainnier, Earl F. Twelve Englishmen of Mystery. Popular Press, 1984.
- Priestman, Martin. The Cambridge Companion to Crime Fiction. Cambridge University Press, 2003.
- Walsdorf, John J. & Allen, Bonnie J. Julian Symons: A Bibliography. Oak Knoll Press, 1996.
