= Julian Symons =

English author (1912–1994)

- Born: Gustave Julian Symons; 30 May 1912; Clapham, London, England
- Died: 19 November 1994 (aged 82); Walmer, Kent, England
- Occupation: Writer
- Writing career
- Genres: crime fiction; mystery fiction; poetry; biography; literary criticism

Julian Gustave Symons (originally Gustave Julian Symons, pronounced SIMM-ons; 30 May 1912 – 19 November 1994) was a British crime writer and poet. He also wrote social and military history, biography and studies of literature. He was born in Clapham, London, and died in Walmer, Kent.

== Life and work ==
Julian Symons was born in London to auctioneer Morris Albert Symons (died 1929), of Russian-Polish Jewish immigrant parentage, and Minnie Louise (died 1964), née Bull. He was a younger brother, and later the biographer, of writer A. J. A. Symons. Like his brother, due to the family's straitened financial circumstances, he left school at 14, having attended a "school for backward children" owing to his severe stutter. He was subsequently mainly self-educated, whilst working as a typist and clerk for an engineering firm. He founded the poetry magazine Twentieth Century Verse in 1937, editing it for two years. His crime writing in the 1930s was incidental; later he became a major crime writer; by using irony, he pointed out the violence hidden in everyday life. His writing advanced beyond the mystery genre.

He was a Trotskyist and sought status as a conscientious objector in World War II, but was refused by his tribunal. He served in the Royal Armoured Corps 1942 to 1944, when he was invalided out with a non-battle-related arm injury. After a period as an advertising copywriter, he became a full-time writer in 1947. During his career, he won two Edgar Awards from the Mystery Writers of America and, in 1982, received the MWA's Grand Master Award. Symons served as the president of the Detection Club from 1976 till 1985.

Symons's 1972 book Bloody Murder: From the Detective Story to the Crime Novel (published as Mortal Consequences in the US) is one of the best-known critical works in the field of crime fiction. Revised editions were published in 1985, 1992 and finally in 1994. Symons highlighted the distinction between the classic puzzler mystery, associated with such writers as Agatha Christie and John Dickson Carr, and the more modern "crime novel," which puts emphasis on psychology and motivation.

Symons published over thirty crime novels and story collections between 1945 and 1994. His works combined elements of both the detective story and the crime novel, but leaned clearly toward the latter, with an emphasis on character and psychology which anticipated later crime fiction writers such as Ruth Rendell and P.D. James. His novels tend to focus on ordinary people drawn into a murderous chain of events; the intricate plots are often spiced with black humour. Novels typical of his style include The Colour of Murder (1957), the Edgar-winning The Progress of a Crime (1960), The Man Whose Dreams Came True (1968) The Man Who Lost His Wife (1970) and The Plot Against Roger Ryder (1973).

Symons wrote two modern-day Sherlock Holmes pastiches, as well as a pastiche set in the 1920s. In A Three-Pipe Problem (1975), the detective was "...a television actor, Sheridan Haynes, who wears the mask of Sherlock Holmes and assumes his character. The book neatly reversed the usual theme of the criminal behind the mask by having a rather commonplace man wearing the mask of the great detective." A sequel The Kentish Manor Murders was written in 1988. For his 1981 book The Great Detectives, he wrote a Sherlock Holmes pastiche instead of a biographical sketch. Entitled "How a Hermit was Disturbed in His Retirement," the events of the tale take place in the 1920s as Sherlock Holmes is drawn out of retirement to solve an unusual missing persons case. The story was included in the collection The Further Adventures of Sherlock Holmes, in which it was given the more Doylean title of "The Adventure of Hillerman Hall." He also made occasional forays into historical mystery, such as The Blackheath Poisonings (1978), which was filmed for television in 1992, and with Sweet Adelaide (1980).

In 1941, Symons married Kathleen Clark; they had a daughter Sarah and a son, Mark. Symons died at his home at Walmer, in Kent, and was survived by his widow and son.

== Works ==
=== Crime fiction ===
==== Inspector Bland ====
- The Immaterial Murder Case (1945)
- A Man Called Jones (1947)
- Bland Beginning (1949)

==== Inspector Crambo ====
- The Narrowing Circle (1954) (filmed in 1956 as The Narrowing Circle)
- The Gigantic Shadow (1958), as The Pipe Dream (US)

==== Sheridan Haynes ====
- A Three-Pipe Problem (1975)
- The Kentish Manor Murders (1988)

==== Joan Khan-Harper ====
- The Man Who Killed Himself (1967) (filmed in 1969 as Arthur! Arthur!)
- The Man Whose Dreams Came True (1968)
- The Man Who Lost His Wife (1970)
- The Players and the Game (1972)
- The Plot Against Roger Rider (1973)
- The Detling Murders (1982), as The Detling Secret (US)

==== Other novels ====
- The Thirty-First of February (1950)
- The Broken Penny (1953)
- The Paper Chase (1956), as Bogue's Fortune (US)
- The Colour of Murder (1957) (Winner, 1957 Gold Dagger Award)
- The Progress of a Crime (1960) (Winner, 1961 Edgar Award, Best Novel)
- The Killing of Francie Lake (1962), as The Plain Man (US)
- The End of Solomon Grundy (1964)
- The Belting Inheritance (1965)
- The Blackheath Poisonings (1978)
- Sweet Adelaide (1980)
- The Name of Annabel Lee (1983)
- The Criminal Comedy of the Contented Couple (1985), as A Criminal Comedy (US)
- Death's Darkest Face (1990)
- Something Like a Love Affair (1992)
- Playing Happy Families (1994)
- A Sort of Virtue: A Political Crime Novel (1996)

=== Collected short crime fiction ===
==== Francis Quarles ====
- Murder! Murder! (1961)
  - Centre Court Mystery; Test Match Murder; The Grand National Case; The Case of SW2; The Unhappy Piano Tuner; A Pearl among Women; Credit to William Shakespeare; Meeting in the Snow; The Wrong Hat; The Absent-Minded Professor; Each Man Kills; Time for Murder; The Case of the Frightened Promoter; Picture Show; Sailors' Hornpipe; The Hiding Place; Airport Incident; The Plaster Pekingese; Comedy in Venice; The Invisible Poison; Little Man Lost
- Francis Quarles Investigates (1965)
  - Strolling in the Square One Day; The Archer; Out of the Mouths; Thirty Days Hath September; The Woman Afraid of October; Blue Paint; One Little Letter; The Santa Claus Club; Hot Summer Night; Coffee for Three; Four Letters; Kidnap Plot; A Matter of Dentistry; By the Sea; Ace of Spades
- The Detections of Francis Quarles (Crippen & Landru, 2006)
  - Red Rum Means Murder; Death in the Scillies; Poison Pen; An Exercise in Logic; Summer Show; The Desk; Mrs Rolleston's Diamonds; Murder - But How Was it Done?; Ancestor Worship; Iced Champagne; No Use Turning a Deaf Ear to Murder; The Duke of York; Double Double Cross; Tattoo; Jack and Jill; The Conjuring Trick; Happy Hexing; No Deception; The Second Bullet; Preserving the Evidence; Death for Mr Golightly; A Man with Blue hair; The Two Suitors; Airborne with a Borgia; Art Loving Mr Lister Lands a Fake; The Collector; Ghost from the Past; The Swedish Nightingale; The Barton Hall Dwarf; The Pepoli Case; Nothing up His Sleeve; A Present from Santa Claus; The Link; Little Boy Blue; Affection Unlimited; The Whistling Man; Party Line; Who Killed Harrington?; Murder in Reverse; The Vanishing Trick; The impossible Theft; Final Night Extra

==== Other collections ====
- How to Trap a Crook (1977)
  - Experiment in Personality; A Theme for Hyacinth; Eight Minutes to Kill; 'Twixt the Cup and the Lip; How to Trap a Crook; Strolling in the Square One Day; The Tiger's Stripe; Love Affair; Credit to Shakespeare; The Main Chance; The Santa Claus Club; The Sensitive Ears of Mr. Small; Pickup on the Dover Road
- The Great Detectives: Seven Original Investigations (1981)
  - How a Hermit Was Disturbed in His Retirement; About Miss Marple and St. Mary Mead; In Which Archie Goodwin Remembers; Which Expounds the Ellery Queens Mystery; About Maigret and the Stolen Papers; Life of Hercule Poirot Based on the Notes of Captain Arthur Hastings; About the birth of Philip Marlowe
- The Tigers of Subtopia (1982)
  - The Tigers of Subtopia; The Dupe; Somebody Else; The Flowers That Bloom in the Spring; The Boiler; The Murderer; A Theme For Hyacinth; The Last Time; The Flaw; Love Affair; The Best Chess Player in the World
- The Man Who Hated Television (1995)
  - The Man Who Hated Television; In the Bluebell Wood; Et in Arcadia Ego; Has anybody here seen me?; The birthmark; Waiting for Mr. McGregor; The Conjuring Trick; The dream is better; The Borgia Heirloom ; Did Sherlock Holmes meet Hercule?; Holocaust at Mayhem Parva
- A Julian Symons Sherlockian Duet (2000)
  - Did Sherlock Holmes Meet Hercule...?; The Affair of the Vanishing Diamonds

=== Biography, history and literary criticism ===
- A. J. A. Symons: His Life & Speculations (1950) biography
- Charles Dickens (1951)
- Thomas Carlyle. The Life and Ideas of a Prophet (1952) biography
- Criminal Acts (1955)
- Horatio Bottomley (1955) biography
- The General Strike. A Historical Portrait (1957) history
- A Reasonable Doubt (1960) non-fiction
- The Thirties: a Dream Revolved (1960) revised 1975
- Buller's Campaign (1963) military history
- England's Pride: The Story of the Gordon Relief Expedition (1965) military history
- Crime and Detection: An Illustrated History from 1840 (1966)
- Critical Occasions (1966) essays
- Between the Wars: Britain in Photographs (1972) history
- Notes From Another Country (1972) autobiographical
- Bloody Murder: From the Detective Story to the Crime Novel: A History (1972) (US title: Mortal Consequences) Special Edgar Award, 1973; revised in 1985, third revised edition 1992, fourth revised edition 1994.
- A Reflection on Auden (1973) broadsheet poem
- The Angry 30s (1976) history
- The Tell-Tale Heart: The Life and Works of Edgar Allan Poe (1978)
- Conan Doyle: Portrait of an Artist (1979)
- Tom Adams' Agatha Christie Cover Story (1981) (US title: Agatha Christie: The Art of Her Crimes. The Paintings of Tom Adams) (1981) introduction by John Fowles
- Critical Observations: Diverse Essays (1981)
- Crime and Detection Quiz (1983)
- 1948 and 1984. The Second Orwell Memorial Lecture (1984)
- Dashiel Hammett (1985)
- Two Brothers. Fragments of a Correspondence (1985)
- Makers of the New: The Revolution in Literature, 1912–1939 (1987)
- Oscar Wilde: A Problem in Biography (1988) Lurcy Lecture, Amherst College
- Somebody Else (1990) stories
- The Thirties and The Nineties (1990)
- Portraits of The Missing: Imaginary Biographies (1991)
- Does Literature Exist? (1992) Lurcy Lecture, Amherst College
- Criminal Practices: Symons on Crime Writing 60s to 90s (1994)

=== Edited collections ===
- An Anthology of War Poetry (1942) editor
- Selected Writings of Samuel Johnson (1949) editor
- Carlyle: Selected Works (1957) editor
- Essays & Biographies by A.J.A. Symons (1969) editor
- Verdict of Thirteen: a Detection Club Anthology (1978)
- Edgar Allan Poe Selected Tales (1980) editor
- New Poetry 9, an Arts Council Anthology (1983) editor
- Classic Crime Omnibus (1984) editor, stories

=== Short stories and novellas ===
- Strolling in the Square One Day. Collected in Francis Quarles Investigates and How to Trap a Crook (Francis Quarles)
- The Archer. Collected in Francis Quarles Investigates (Francis Quarles)
- Out of the Mouths. Collected in Francis Quarles Investigates (Francis Quarles)
- Thirty Days Hath September. Collected in Francis Quarles Investigates (Francis Quarles)
- The Woman Afraid of October. Collected in Francis Quarles Investigates (Francis Quarles)
- Blue Paint. Collected in Francis Quarles Investigates (Francis Quarles)
- One Little Letter. Collected in Francis Quarles Investigates (Francis Quarles)
- The Santa Claus Club. Collected in Francis Quarles Investigates and How to Trap a Crook (Francis Quarles)
- Hot Summer Night. Collected in Francis Quarles Investigates (Francis Quarles)
- Coffee for Three. Collected in Francis Quarles Investigates (Francis Quarles)
- Four letters. Collected in Francis Quarles Investigates (Francis Quarles)
- Kidnap Plot. Collected in Francis Quarles Investigates (Francis Quarles)
- By the Sea. Collected in Francis Quarles Investigates (Francis Quarles)
- The Hiding Place. Collected in Murder! Murder! (Francis Quarles)
- Comedy in Venice. Collected in Murder! Murder! (Francis Quarles)
- Little Man Lost. Collected in Murder! Murder! (Francis Quarles)
- The Tigers of Subtopia. Collected in The Tigers of Subtopia
- The Dupe. Collected in The Tigers of Subtopia
- Somebody Else. Collected in The Tigers of Subtopia
- The Flowers that Bloom in the Spring. Collected in The Tigers of Subtopia
- The Boiler. Collected in The Tigers of Subtopia
- The Murderer. Collected in The Tigers of Subtopia
- The Last Time. Collected in The Tigers of Subtopia
- The Flaw. Collected in The Tigers of Subtopia
- The Best Chess Player in the World. Collected in The Tigers of Subtopia
- Experiment in Personality. Collected in How to Trap a Crook
- A Theme for Hyacinth. Collected in How to Trap a Crook and The Tigers of Subtopia
- 'Twixt the Cup and the Lip. Collected in How to Trap a Crook
- How to Trap a Crook. Collected in How to Trap a Crook (Francis Quarles)
- The Tiger's Stripe. Collected in How to Trap a Crook
- Love Affair. Collected in How to Trap a Crook and The Tigers of Subtopia
- The Main Chance. Collected in How to Trap a Crook
- The Sensitive Ears of Mr Small. Collected in How to Trap a Crook
- Pickup on the Dover Road. Collected in How to Trap a Crook
- The Case of the Frightened Promoter. (London) Evening Standard, 9 May 1950. Collected in Murder! Murder! (Francis Quarles)
- Affection Unlimited. (London) Evening Standard, 10 July 1950. Collected in The Detections of Francis Quarles (Francis Quarles)
- The Unhappy Piano Tuner. (London) Evening Standard, 20 July 1950. Collected in Murder! Murder! (Francis Quarles)
- The Case of SW2. (London) Evening Standard, 3 August 1950. Collected in Murder! Murder! (Francis Quarles)
- Mrs Rolleston's Diamonds. (London) Evening Standard, 10 August 1950. Collected in The Detections of Francis Quarles (Francis Quarles)
- Happy Hexing. (London) Evening Standard, 19 September 1950. Collected in The Detections of Francis Quarles (Francis Quarles)
- The Desk. (London) Evening Standard, 29 September 1950. Collected in The Detections of Francis Quarles (Francis Quarles)
- Murder - But How Was it Done?. (London) Evening Standard, 29 October 1950. Collected in The Detections of Francis Quarles (Francis Quarles)
- Who Killed Harrington?. (London) Evening Standard, 28 November 1950. Collected in The Detections of Francis Quarles (Francis Quarles)
- Credit to William Shakespeare. (London) Evening Standard, 12 December 1950. Collected in Murder! Murder! and How to Trap a Crook (Francis Quarles)
- Death in the Scillies. (London) Evening Standard, 13 March 1951. Collected in The Detections of Francis Quarles (Francis Quarles)
- Ghost from the Past. (London) Evening Standard, 1 October 1951. Collected in The Detections of Francis Quarles (Francis Quarles)
- The Pepoli Case. (London) Evening Standard, 2 February 1952. Collected in The Detections of Francis Quarles (Francis Quarles)
- Each Man Kills. (London) Evening Standard, 26 March 1952. Collected in Murder! Murder! (Francis Quarles)
- Red Rum Means Murder. (London) Evening Standard, 15 May 1952. Collected in The Detections of Francis Quarles (Francis Quarles)
- A Matter of Dentistry. (London) Evening Standard, 25 June 1952. Collected in Francis Quarles Investigates (Francis Quarles)
- The Whistling Man. (London) Evening Standard, 9 July 1952. Collected in The Detections of Francis Quarles (Francis Quarles)
- The Vanishing Trick. (London) Evening Standard, 28 July 1952. Collected in The Detections of Francis Quarles (Francis Quarles)
- An Exercise in Logic. (London) Evening Standard, 8 September 1952. Collected in The Detections of Francis Quarles (Francis Quarles)
- Poison Pen. (London) Evening Standard, 15 September 1952. Collected in The Detections of Francis Quarles (Francis Quarles)
- Preserving the Evidence. (London) Evening Standard, 18 September 1952. Collected in The Detections of Francis Quarles (Francis Quarles)
- Nothing up His Sleeve. (London) Evening Standard, 23 September 1952. Collected in The Detections of Francis Quarles (Francis Quarles)
- Double Double Cross. (London) Evening Standard, 25 September 1952. Collected in The Detections of Francis Quarles (Francis Quarles)
- Death for Mr Golightly. (London) Evening Standard, 22 December 1952. Collected in The Detections of Francis Quarles (Francis Quarles)
- A Pearl among Women. (London) Evening Standard, 26 January 1953. Collected in Murder! Murder! (Francis Quarles)
- The Duke of York. (London) Evening Standard, 27 January 1953. Collected in The Detections of Francis Quarles (Francis Quarles)
- The Conjuring Trick. (London) Evening Standard, 28 January 1953. Collected in The Man Who Hated Television and The Detections of Francis Quarles (Francis Quarles)
- No Deception. (London) Evening Standard, 29 January 1953. Collected in The Detections of Francis Quarles (Francis Quarles)
- The Link. (London) Evening Standard, 30 January 1953. Collected in The Detections of Francis Quarles (Francis Quarles)
- A Man with Blue Hair. (London) Evening Standard, 31 January 1953. Collected in The Detections of Francis Quarles (Francis Quarles)
- The Swedish Nightingale. (London) Evening Standard, 14 September 1953. Collected in The Detections of Francis Quarles (Francis Quarles)
- The Two Suitors. (London) Evening Standard, 15 September 1953. Collected in The Detections of Francis Quarles (Francis Quarles)
- Tattoo. (London) Evening Standard, 16 September 1953. Collected in The Detections of Francis Quarles (Francis Quarles)
- The Collector. (London) Evening Standard, 18 September 1953. Collected in The Detections of Francis Quarles (Francis Quarles)
- Jack and Jill. (London) Evening Standard, 19 September 1953; also published as Death by Drowning. Aberdeen Evening Express, 22 October 1953. Collected in The Detections of Francis Quarles (Francis Quarles)
- Iced Champagne. (London) Evening Standard, 19 October 1953. Collected in The Detections of Francis Quarles (Francis Quarles)
- Sailors' Hornpipe. Aberdeen Evening Express, 22 October 1953. Collected in Murder! Murder! (Francis Quarles)
- Picture Show. (London) Evening Standard, 1 January 1954. Collected in Murder! Murder! (Francis Quarles)
- Ace of Spades. (London) Evening Standard, 2 January 1954. Collected in Francis Quarles Investigates (Francis Quarles)
- Time for Murder. Aberdeen Evening Express, 2 February 1954. Collected in Murder! Murder! (Francis Quarles)
- The Plaster Pekingese. Aberdeen Evening Express, 3 February 1954. Collected in Murder! Murder! (Francis Quarles)
- Airport Incident. Aberdeen Evening Express, 4 February 1954. Collected in Murder! Murder! (Francis Quarles)
- Absent-Minded Professor. (London) Evening Standard, 4 May 1954. Collected in Murder! Murder! as "The Absent-Minded Professor" (Francis Quarles)
- The Barton Hall Dwarf ("Deckchair Detective No. 1"). (London) Evening Standard, 16 August 1954. Collected in The Detections of Francis Quarles (Francis Quarles)
- The Invisible Poison ("Deckchair Detective No. 2"). (London) Evening Standard, 17 August 1954. Collected in Murder! Murder! (Francis Quarles)
- Meeting in the Snow ("Deckchair Detective No. 3"). (London) Evening Standard, 18 August 1954. Collected in Murder! Murder! (Francis Quarles)
- The Wrong Hat. ("Deckchair Detective No. 5"). (London) Evening Standard, 19 August 1954. Collected in Murder! Murder! (Francis Quarles)
- Little Boy Blue ("Deckchair Detective No. 4"). (London) Evening Standard, 20 August 1954. Collected in The Detections of Francis Quarles (Francis Quarles)
- Summer Show (Deckchair Detective No. 6). (London) Evening Standard, 21 August 1954. Collected in The Detections of Francis Quarles (Francis Quarles)
- A Present from Santa Claus. (London) Evening Standard, 24 December 1954. Collected in The Detections of Francis Quarles (Francis Quarles)
- Final Night Extra (London Alibi No. 6). (London) Evening Standard, 3 September 1955; solution published on 5 September 1955. Collected in The Detections of Francis Quarles (Francis Quarles)
- Airborne with a Borgia. (London) Evening Standard, 28 September 1955. Collected in The Detections of Francis Quarles (Francis Quarles)
- Murder at the Grand National. (London) Evening Standard, 11 March to 1 April 1956. Collected in Murder! Murder! as "The Grand National Case" (Francis Quarles)
- The Centre Court Mystery. (London) Evening Standard, 25 June to 7 July 1956. Collected in Murder! Murder! as "Centre Court Mystery"(Francis Quarles)
- The Oval Test Murder. (London) Evening Standard, 20 August to 1 October 1956. Collected in Murder! Murder! as "Test Match Murder" (Francis Quarles)
- Party Line. (London) Evening Standard, 30 October 1956. Collected in The Detections of Francis Quarles (Francis Quarles)
- The Second Bullet. (London) Evening Standard, 31 October 1956. Collected in The Detections of Francis Quarles (Francis Quarles)
- Murder in Reverse. (London) Evening Standard, 2 November 1956. Collected in The Detections of Francis Quarles (Francis Quarles)
- Ancestor Worship. (London) Evening Standard, 3 November 1956. Collected in The Detections of Francis Quarles (Francis Quarles)
- Eight Minutes to Kill. (London) Evening Standard, 30 May to 8 June 1957. Collected in How to Trap a Crook
- Art Loving Mr Lister Lands a Fake. (London) Evening Standard, 13 March 1963. Collected in The Detections of Francis Quarles (Francis Quarles)
- No Use Turning a Deaf Ear to Murder. (London) Evening Standard, 1 June 1964. Collected in The Detections of Francis Quarles (Francis Quarles)
- The Impossible Theft. Ellery Queen's Mystery Magazine, January 1966. Collected in The Detections of Francis Quarles (Francis Quarles)
- How a Hermit Was Disturbed in His Retirement. The Great Detectives: Seven Original Investigations (Sherlock Holmes)
- About Miss Marple and St Mary Mead. The Great Detectives: Seven Original Investigations (Miss Marple)
- In Which Archie Goodwin Remembers. The Great Detectives: Seven Original Investigations (Nero Wolfe)
- Which Expounds the Ellery Queens Mystery. The Great Detectives: Seven Original Investigations (Ellery Queen)
- About Maigret and the Stolen Papers. The Great Detectives: Seven Original Investigations (Inspector Maigret)
- The Life of Hercule Poirot: based on the notes of Captain Arthur Hastings. The Great Detectives: Seven Original Investigations (Hercule Poirot). Published in a limited edition of 200 copies (1988); and reprinted in The Man Who Hated Television as Did Sherlock Holmes Meet Hercule?
- About the Birth of Philip Marlowe. The Great Detectives: Seven Original Investigations (Philip Marlowe)
- The Man Who Hated Television. Collected in The Man Who Hated Television
- In The Bluebell Wood. Collected in The Man Who Hated Television
- Et In Arcadia Ego. Collected in The Man Who Hated Television
- Has Anybody Here Seen Me?. Collected in The Man Who Hated Television
- The Birthmark. Collected in The Man Who Hated Television
- Waiting For Mr. McGregor. Collected in The Man Who Hated Television
- The Dream Is Better. Collected in The Man Who Hated Television
- The Borgia Heirloom. Collected in The Man Who Hated Television
- Holocaust At Mayhem Parva. Collected in The Man Who Hated Television

=== Poetry ===
Volumes

- Confusions About X (Fortune Press 1939)
- The Second Man (1943)

Individual poems

- Poem. Poetry, Vol. 52 No. 6, September 1938
- The Other Cheek. Poetry, Vol. 54 No. 1, April 1939
- Poem. Poetry, Vol. 56 No. 6, September 1940
- Pub. Poetry, Vol. 56 No. 6, September 1940
- End of a Year. Poetry, Vol. 56 No. 6, September 1940
- Spring Poem. Poetry, Vol. 59 No. 5, February 1942
- Hart Crane. Poetry, Vol. 59 No. 5, February 1942
- Eleven Meetings. Poetry, Vol. 59 No. 5, February 1942
- The Clock. Poetry, Vol. 59 No. 5, February 1942

=== Uncollected fiction ===
- A Cup of Tea. (London) Evening Standard, 12 September 1950 (Francis Quarles)
- The Clue in the Book. (London) Evening Standard, 5 May 1952 (Francis Quarles)
- Stealing the Picture. Aberdeen Evening Express, 5 February 1954
- The Cupboard Was Bare. (London) Evening Standard, 6 July 1955 (Francis Quarles)
- Murder Too Perfect. (London) Evening Standard, 19 July 1955 (Francis Quarles)
- Death of an MP (London Alibi No. 1). (London) Evening Standard, 29 August 1955; solution published on 30 August 1955 (Francis Quarles)
- Dial 999 (London Alibi No. 2). (London) Evening Standard, 30 August 1955; solution published on 31 August 1955 (Francis Quarles)
- The Claimant (London Alibi No. 3). (London) Evening Standard, 31 August 1955; solution published on 1 September 1955 (Francis Quarles)
- Mr Longden Had a Diary (London Alibi No. 4). (London) Evening Standard, 1 September 1955; solution published on 2 September 1955 (Francis Quarles)
- The Briefcase (London Alibi No. 5). (London) Evening Standard, 2 September 1955; solution published on 3 September 1955 (Francis Quarles)
- The What's-My-Line? Murder. (London) Evening Standard, 27 February to 8 March 1956; solution published on 3 September 1955 (Francis Quarles)
- James Mason Investigates. (London) Evening Standard, 18 to 27 March 1957
- A Point of Ethics. (London) Evening Standard, 5 October 1957
- A Mystery in Spain. Aberdeen Evening Express, 25 February 1961
- The Post-Mortem Letters. Ellery Queen's Mystery Magazine, May 1979
- Value for Money. Ellery Queen's Mystery Magazine, December 1980

=== Uncollected non-fiction ===
- Obscurity and Dylan Thomas. Kenyon Review, Vol. 2 No. 1, Winter 1940
- A London Letter: the Wartime Literary Situation. Kenyon Review, Vol. 2 No. 2, Spring 1940
- Louis MacNeice: The Artists as Everyman. Poetry, Vol. 56 No. 2, May 1940
- Restoration Comedy (Reconsiderations II). Kenyon Review, Vol. 7 No. 2, Spring 1945
- The Lawyer takes a Wife (Life, People & Books), Manchester Evening News, 28 November 1946
- Shades of Dr Johnson (Life, People & Books), Manchester Evening News, 5 December 1946
- Old John Small (Life, People & Books), Manchester Evening News, 17 January 1947
- Strategy in War - and Peace (Life, People & Books), Manchester Evening News, 6 March 1947
- Getting Away with Murder (Life, People & Books), Manchester Evening News, 13 March 1947
- Low-Down on the Left (Life, People & Books), Manchester Evening News, 10 April 1947
- The Queen of Diamonds (Life, People & Books), Manchester Evening News, 2 May 1947
- How to Sell a Cake of Soap (Life, People & Books), Manchester Evening News, 22 May 1947
- Mr Temple Takes a Stroll (Life, People & Books), Manchester Evening News, 29 May 1947
- Famine Came to Throstlestone (Life, People & Books), Manchester Evening News, 12 June 1947
- Last Bends and Final Straights (Life, People & Books), Manchester Evening News, 26 June 1947
- There's a Slump in Books (Life, People & Books), Manchester Evening News, 22 July 1947
- The Big Five (Life, People & Books), Manchester Evening News, 14 August 1947
- The March of Time (Life, People & Books), Manchester Evening News, 21 August 1947
- A Pack of Cards (Life, People & Books), Manchester Evening News, 28 August 1947
- Live Words among the Dead (Life, People & Books), Manchester Evening News, 9 October 1947
- The Traveller on the Dusty Road (Life, People & Books), Manchester Evening News, 23 October 1947
- Between Two Beards (Life, People & Books), Manchester Evening News, 17 December 1947
- Pick Your Poet (Life, People & Books), Manchester Evening News, 2 January 1948
- What Makes a Criminal? (Life, People & Books), Manchester Evening News, 24 March 1948
- Antidote, Tonic - or Escape? (Life, People & Books), Manchester Evening News, 30 June 1948
- A Bird in the Bush (Life, People & Books), Manchester Evening News, 17 November 1948
- The Biggest Problem in the World (Life, People & Books), Manchester Evening News, 15 December 1948
- Who Is Our Best Read Novelist? (Life, People & Books), Manchester Evening News, 16 February 1949
- They Took the Long Jump to Freedom (Life, People & Books), Manchester Evening News, 23 February 1949
- Which Is the True Russia? (Life, People & Books), Manchester Evening News, 27 April 1949
- These Make Good Holiday Reading (Life, People & Books), Manchester Evening News, 30 June 1949
- I Call It Detective Fever (Life, People & Books), Manchester Evening News, 17 August 1949
- The Poet and the Theatre (Life, People & Books), Manchester Evening News, 23 March 1950
- Genius, Crank or Dabbler? (Life, People & Books), Manchester Evening News, 30 March 1950
- The Man Who Went to Moscow (Life, People & Books), Manchester Evening News, 20 April 1950
- Nation Looking for a Cure-All (Life, People & Books), Manchester Evening News, 27 April 1950
- The Man Who Hated the Poor ... (Life, People & Books), Manchester Evening News, 4 May 1950
- Three Ways to See a Country (Life, People & Books), Manchester Evening News, 11 May 1950
- Snail Tea for Breakfast? (Life, People & Books), Manchester Evening News, 29 June 1950
- Shavians Without Knowing it (Life, People & Books), Manchester Evening News, 6 July 1950
- Cat Naps and a High Jump (Life, People & Books), Manchester Evening News, 13 July 1950
- How to Get Away from It All (Life, People & Books), Manchester Evening News, 10 August 1950
- Sophocles in Three Scenes (Life, People & Books), Manchester Evening News, 19 October 1950
- Poets' Plight (Life, People & Books), Manchester Evening News, 25 October 1950
- When the Balloons Went Up (Life, People & Children's Books), Manchester Evening News, 9 November 1950
- Novels of Four Nations (Life, People & Books), Manchester Evening News, 1 March 1951
- The Last of the Edwardian Giants ... (Life, People & Books), Manchester Evening News, 15 March 1951
- Bloomsburyites - They Started It All (Life, People & Books), Manchester Evening News, 3 June 1954
- Dodgers, Scroungers & a Captain at Sea (Life, People & Books), Manchester Evening News, 28 October 1954
- Arthur James Cook (Gamblers with Fate). Birmingham Evening Despatch, 15 November 1954
- Whitaker Wright (Gamblers with Fate). Birmingham Evening Despatch, 16 November 1954
- Murder - Plus Good Writing (Life, People & Books), Manchester Evening News, 12 May 1955
- Kruschev Said 'Come and See What We're Like' (Life, People & Books), Manchester Evening News, 31 May 1955
- What It's Like to Be 'On the Run' (Life, People & Books), Manchester Evening News, 20 August 1955
- They Worked So Hard to Be Gay (Life, People & Books), Manchester Evening News, 29 September 1955
- Did Spiritual Exercises Really Cure Eva Barton?. (London) Daily Mail, 3 December 1957
- One Thing They All Said: SUBUD Makes You into a Different Person. (London) Daily Mail, 4 December 1957
- Frank Cousins under the Microscope. (London) Daily Mail, 11 January 1958
- The Enigma of Frank Cousins. (London) Daily Mail, 13 January 1958
- Cousins Can't Make Them Cry. (London) Daily Mail, 14 January 1958
- Artists in Fraud. Sydney Morning Herald, 27 June 1959
- A Touch of Fowles' Play. (London) Daily Mail, 6 October 1977
