= The Blackheath Poisonings =

1978 novel

- First edition (UK)
- Author: Julian Symons
- Language: English
- Genre: Historical mystery
- Publisher: Collins Crime Club (UK); Harper & Row (US)
- Publication date: 1978
- Publication place: United Kingdom
- Media type: Print
- Pages: 302
- ISBN: 0060142111

The Blackheath Poisonings is a 1978 historical mystery novel by the British writer Julian Symons. It is a murder mystery set in the late Victorian era.

== Plot ==
Two families, the Collards and Vandervents have lived together for many years in the same elegant house in the wealthy London suburb of Blackheath. The two have grown intermingled over the years, with numerous secrets. When they begin falling dead to mysterious stomach complaints, Paul Vandervent begins investigating.

== Television adaptation ==
In 1992 it was adapted into a British television series of the same title featuring Zoë Wanamaker, Patrick Malahide, Christien Anholt and Ronald Fraser.

== Bibliography ==
- Forshaw, Barry. British Crime Film: Subverting the Social Order. Springer, 2012. ASIN B00A208MPI. ISBN 0230303706.
- Walsdorf, John J. & Allen, Bonnie J. Julian Symons: A Bibliography. Oak Knoll Press, 1996.
