= Samuel Gallu =

American writer (1918–1991)

- Born: March 21, 1918; Woodbine, New Jersey, U.S.
- Died: March 27, 1991 (aged 73); Doylestown, Pennsylvania, U.S.
- Other name: Sam Gallu
- Occupations: Producer, director, writer
- Years active: 1955–1982

Samuel Gallu (March 21, 1918 – March 27, 1991) was an American writer, producer and director of film, theatre and television. He is also sometimes credited as Sam Gallu.

== Selected filmography ==
- Navy Log (1955–58, TV)
- The Man Outside (1967)
- Theatre of Death (1967)
- The Limbo Line (1968)
- Arthur? Arthur! (1969)
- Give 'em Hell, Harry! (1975)

== Theatrical works ==
- Give 'em Hell, Harry! (1974) (author)
- Churchill: A Man Alone (1982) (author and producer)

== Bibliography ==
- Huckvale, David. A Green and Pagan Land: Myth, Magic and Landscape in British Film and Television. McFarland, 2018.
- Hyatt, Wesley. Short-Lived Television Series, 1948–1978: Thirty Years of More Than 1,000 Flops. McFarland, 2015.
