= Zen (TV series) =

- Genre: Police drama
- Based on: Aurelio Zen by Michael Dibdin
- Written by: Simon Burke; Peter Berry
- Directed by: John Alexander (Vendetta); Christopher Menaul (Cabal); Jon Jones (Ratking)
- Starring: Rufus Sewell; Caterina Murino; Ben Miles; Catherine Spaak; Stanley Townsend; Ed Stoppard; Francesco Quinn; Anthony Higgins
- Opening theme: Adrian Johnston
- Composer: Adrian Johnston
- Countries of origin: United Kingdom; Italy; Germany
- Original language: English
- No. of series: 1
- No. of episodes: 3

Production
- Executive producers: Andy Harries; Francis Hopkinson; Raffaella Bonivento; Rebecca Eaton; Anne Mensah
- Producer: Michael Casey
- Production location: Rome
- Cinematography: Tony Miller
- Running time: 90 minutes
- Production companies: Left Bank Pictures; Mediaset; Masterpiece; ZDF

Original release
- Network: BBC One
- Release: 2 January – 16 January 2011

Zen is a British television series produced by Left Bank Pictures for the BBC, co-produced with WGBH Boston for its Masterpiece anthology series, Mediaset and ZDF. It stars Rufus Sewell and Caterina Murino and is based on the Aurelio Zen detective novels by Michael Dibdin. The series was filmed on location in Italy, but the dialogue is in English. The series, which comprises three 90-minute films, was broadcast in the United Kingdom on Sunday evenings from 2 January 2011 on BBC One. The three films were based on the books Vendetta (1990), Cabal (1992) and Ratking (1988). The series was cancelled by BBC One in February 2011; BBC One controller Danny Cohen later said there were already enough male crime-fighters on TV. Left Bank, the show's producer, tried to find other broadcasters to fund another series but were unsuccessful.

== Regular cast ==
- Rufus Sewell as Aurelio Zen
  A smart and honest police detective in Rome who struggles to maintain his integrity amongst the bureaucracy and political interference in the department. He is in love with Tania Moretti, but long odds in the betting for who will sleep with her first.
- Caterina Murino as Tania Moretti
  Office support worker for the squad. She is beautiful, smart and compassionate. She likes Zen and is trying to divorce her husband.
- Ben Miles as Amedeo Colonna
  The Minister's fixer. He is a powerful, connected and amoral man who believes that Zen is working for him, something that Zen encourages.
- Stanley Townsend as Moscati
  Zen's boss. He is a gruff, no nonsense man who does not suffer fools gladly. He is fond of Zen and Tania.
- Francesco Quinn as Gilberto Nieddu
  Zen's ex-partner who now runs a private security business. The two have remained friends and Zen asks Gilberto for help when he needs advice or to go outside the department.
- Catherine Spaak as Donata
  Zen's mother who was widowed when her husband was shot on the job. Zen moved in with her after he separated from his wife. She is wise, caring and concerned for her son.
- Vincent Riotta as Giorgio de Angelis
  A colleague whom Zen trusts.
- Ed Stoppard as Vincenzo Fabri
  A detective with a powerful and wealthy uncle who is more interested in playing politics to advance his career than solving cases.
- Anthony Higgins as Eduardo Guerchini
  The Minister, who leaves all the dirty work to Colonna.
- Cosima Shaw as Nadia Pirlo
  Powerful Prosecutor in the case against the cabal, who also tries to get romantically involved with Zen.

== Complete main cast ==
Character	Vendetta	Cabal	Ratking
Pepe Spadola	Gregg Chillin		
Fausto Arcuti	Adrian Hood		
Francesco Pirotta			Franco Maria Salamon
Ana Bini	Katrine De Candole		
Alessandro Antonioni			Rocky Marshall
Giulia			Selene Rosiello
Rossella Nieddu	Yasemin Samino		
Mario	Joseph Long		
Giuseppe Bini		Adrian Schiller	Adrian Schiller
Gilberto Nieddu	Francesco Quinn	Francesco Quinn	Francesco Quinn
Eduardo Guerchini	Anthony Higgins	Anthony Higgins	Anthony Higgins
Ernesto Heuber			Michael McElhatton
Sister Anna			Katy Murphy
Tomassini		Massimiliano Ulaldi	
Silvia		Cariddi Nardulli	Cariddi Nardulli
Angeto	Garry Cooper	Garry Cooper	Garry Cooper
Arianna von Falkenhayn	Valentina Cervi	Valentina Cervi	
Donata	Catherine Spaak	Catherine Spaak	Catherine Spaak
Avel Vasko	Francis Magee		
Branco	Daniele Monterosi	Daniele Monterosi	
Jdg. Corrado Bertolini	Roberto Nobile		
Maria			Nathalie Rapti Gomez
Aurelio Zen	Rufus Sewell	Rufus Sewell	Rufus Sewell
Paolo	Roberto Laureli		
Mara		Julie Cox	
Evie			Susan Duerden
Lucia	Chiara Nicola		
Mazzotta		Emil Marwa	
Tania Moretti	Caterina Murino	Caterina Murino	Caterina Murino
Nadia Pirlo		Cosima Shaw	Cosima Shaw
Amedeo Colonna	Ben Miles	Ben Miles	Ben Miles
Luca La Guardia			Paolo Mazzarelli
Donatella Pirotta			Zoe Tapper
Moscati	Stanley Townsend	Stanley Townsend	Stanley Townsend
Carlo Fagioli			Callum Blue
Ramizi	Sargon Yelda	Sargon Yelda	Sargon Yelda
Tito Spadola	Peter Guinness		
Fellini		Enzo Squillino, Jr.	
Giorgio de Angelis	Vincent Riotta	Vincent Riotta	Vincent Riotta
Cinzia Miletti			Sarah-Jane Potts
Michelangelo Gattuso		Allan Corduner	
Renato Favelloni	Greg Wise		
Vincenzo Fabri	Ed Stoppard	Ed Stoppard	Ed Stoppard
Massimo Colanna		Hilton McRae	
Oscar Faso	Alessandro Cica		
Silvio Miletti			Sebastian Armesto

== Episodes ==
No.	Title	Directed by	Written by	Original release date	UK viewers (millions)
1	"Vendetta"	John Alexander	Simon Burke	2 January 2011	6.24
Detective Zen is sent to a remote village to re-investigate a murder, which may spark a political scandal. Zen is under pressure from the politicians and the Chief of Police, but he would rather be spending time with Tania, the Chief's beautiful assistant. Meanwhile, a gangster is after Zen, seeking revenge.
2	"Cabal"	Christopher Menaul	Simon Burke	9 January 2011	5.64
The death of a famous aristocrat, Umberto Ruspanti, leads Detective Zen into the shadowy world of the Cabal—an organisation more powerful and secret than the Mafia. The Ministry want a quick verdict of suicide, but Zen's not so sure. Meanwhile, things are looking up with Tania.
3	"Ratking"	Jon Jones	Peter Berry & Simon Burke	16 January 2011	5.21
Detective Zen works against the clock to recover the kidnapped Ruggerio Miletti, a wealthy industrialist with political ties. The involvement of the manipulative family and a beautiful grieving widow complicate matters. Meanwhile Tania's husband does everything he can to get rid of Zen.

== United States release ==
Series 1 was first shown in the USA on the PBS network: Vendetta, Cabal, and Ratking on 17, 24 and 31 July 2011, respectively.
