= And Then You Die =

And Then You Die may refer to:

- And Then You Die (film), a 1987 Canadian television crime drama film directed by Francis Mankiewicz
- And Then You Die (novel), a 2002 novel by Michael Dibdin
- And Then You Die (TV series), a British comedy panel show
