= Mary Cawse =

British opera singer (1808–1850)

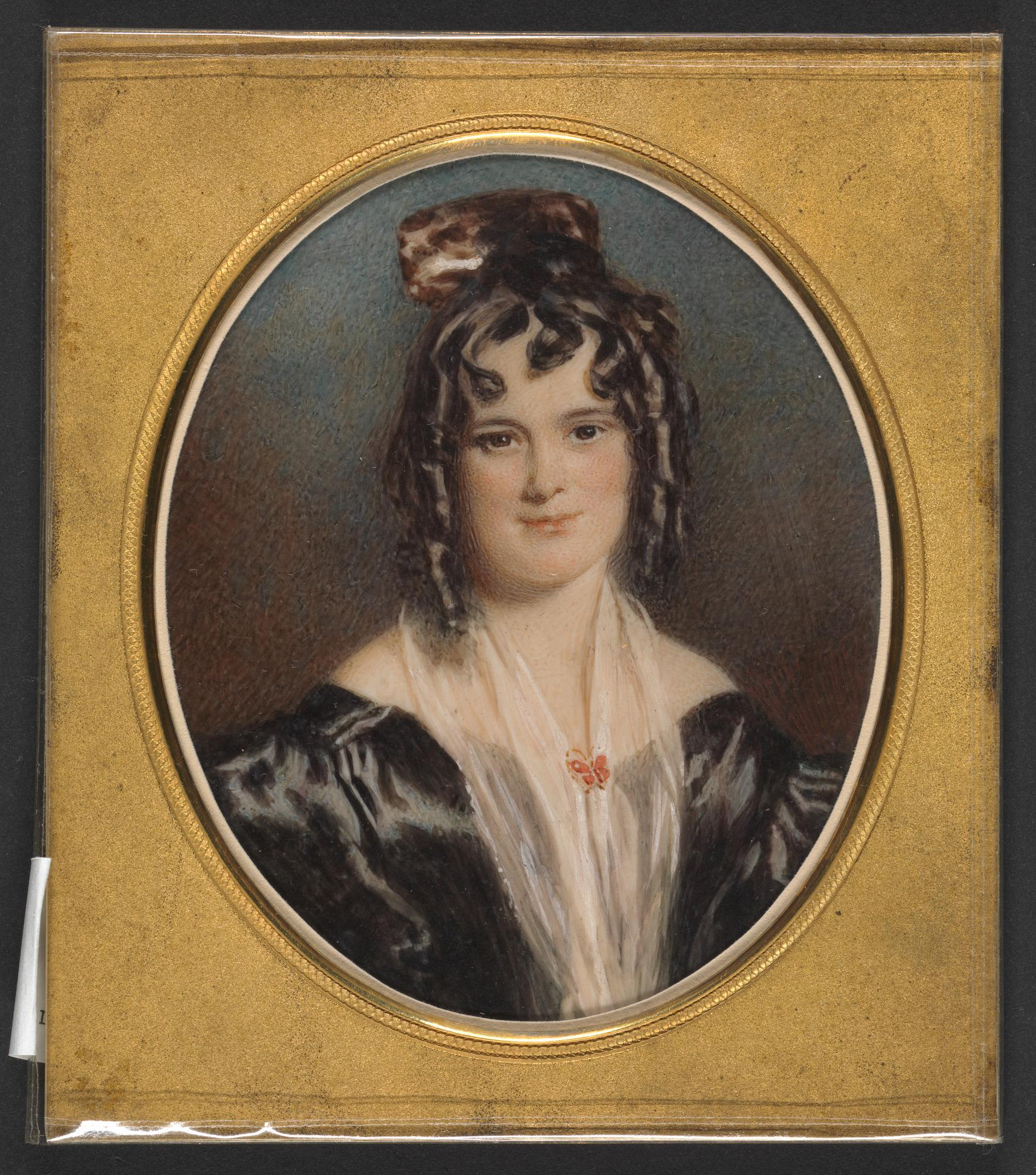
- Born: 14 December 1808; Bloomsbury
- Died: 14 April 1850 (aged 41); Edinburgh
- Occupation: Opera singer
- Parent(s): John Cawse
- Relatives: Harriet Cawse

Mary Giovanna Cawse Edmunds (14 December 1808 – 14 April 1850) was a British opera singer.

== Life ==
Mary Giovanna Cawse was born on 14 December 1808 at No. 13 King Street, Bloomsbury, London, the daughter of painter John Cawse. Her younger sister Harriet Catherine Fiddes was also an opera singer.

Mary and Harriet studied voice under Sir George Smart. Through Smart they came to the attention of Carl Maria von Weber, and the Cawse sisters sang in the second London performance of his cantata The Offering of Devotion at the Shrine of Nature in the Argyll Rooms in 1825.

A soprano, Mary Cawse made her opera debut at Covent Garden in 1826 in The Castle of Sorrento. Her significant appearances at Covent Garden include roles in Fra Diavolo, Weber's Der Freischütz, Robert the Devil, John of Paris, and Cinderella. Elsewhere, she appeared in The Swiss Family, Der Vampyr, and Cosi Fan Tutti.

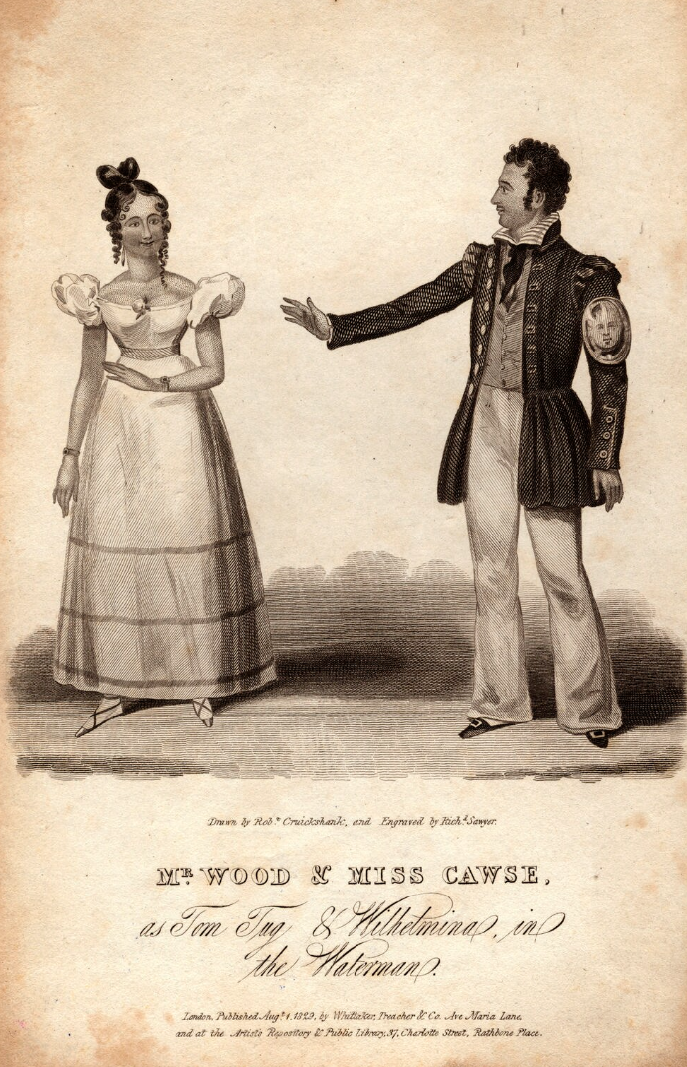
Mr Wood and Miss Mary Cawse in 1829 in Tom Tug

In about 1828 Alfred Edward Chalon created a watercolour of her and the singer Abigail Betts. That watercolour is in the National Portrait Gallery in London. In 1829 an engraving was published showing her in The Waterman. She was playing the role of Wilhemina and Tom Tug was played by actor Joseph Wood.

Cawse married the Scottish tenor Edmund Edmunds. They had six children, including pianist Arthur Cawse Edmunds. She died of bronchitis on 14 April 1850 in Edinburgh.
