= The Last Sherlock Holmes Story =

Novel by Michael Dibdin

- First UK edition
- Author: Michael Dibdin
- Language: English
- Genre: Mystery novels
- Publisher: Jonathan Cape (UK)
- Publication date: 1978
- Media type: Print (Hardback & Paperback)
- Pages: 192
- ISBN: 0-224-01578-8

The Last Sherlock Holmes Story is a Sherlock Holmes pastiche novel by Michael Dibdin. The novel is an account of Holmes's attempt to solve the Jack the Ripper murders.

== Plot ==
In Victorian-era London, noted detective Sherlock Holmes attempts to solve the murder of prostitutes by the serial killer Jack the Ripper. He suspects the Ripper to be his nemesis, James Moriarty. In a twist ending, it is revealed that Holmes himself invented the character of Moriarty due to insanity and was himself committing the crimes. There is also an ambiguity to the revelation as a despairing Holmes tries to explain to his companion John Watson that Moriarty has fooled Watson and framed Holmes.

== See also ==
- A Study in Terror
- Dust and Shadow: An Account of the Ripper Killings by Dr. John H. Watson
- Murder by Decree
