= Harriet Cawse =

Harriet Catherine Fiddes
- Born: Harriet Catherine Cawse; 6 October 1811; Bloomsbury
- Died: 18 February 1889 (aged 77); Halifax, England
- Occupations: opera singer and teacher
- Spouse: John Fiddes
- Parent(s): Mary and John Cawse
- Relatives: Mary Cawse (sister)

Harriet Catherine Fiddes born Harriet Catherine Cawse (6 October 1811 – 18 February 1889) was an English singer, actress and singing tutor. She also worked in Australia during her life.

== Life ==
Fiddes was born in 1811 in the London area of Bloomsbury. She was the daughter of an actor Mary (born Fraser) and a painter John Cawse. Her elder sister Mary Cawse was also an opera singer.

Harriet and her elder sister Mary studied voice under Sir George Smart. Through Smart they came to the attention of Carl Maria von Weber, and the Cawse sisters sang in the second London performance of his cantata The Offering of Devotion at the Shrine of Nature in the Argyll Rooms in 1825.

She was in a melodrama about Queen Anne Boleyn, and in 1825 she sang Fly Away, Dove in The Hebrew Family at the Covent Garden theatre that became her own. She returned the following year to appear in Von Weber's romantic opera Oberon in a lead role of Puck on 12 April 1826. In 1534, still in the Covent Garden, she performed the travesti role of Smeton in Donizetti's Anna Bolena opposite star Giulia Grisi, who was making her British debut in the title role.

She married John Fiddes in 1835. Josephine Fiddes was born in 1839 and there was another child, Frederica, but the marriage failed and Fiddes emigrated to Australia in November 1852 during the years of the Gold Rush. She went on tours that took in California after one to Honolulu. She returned to Britain. In 1861 she published an account of her arrival in Australia (in 1852) for the British magazine Once a Week. In the same year her daughter Josephine was appearing in Rob Roy in Sydney as "Mrs McGregor".

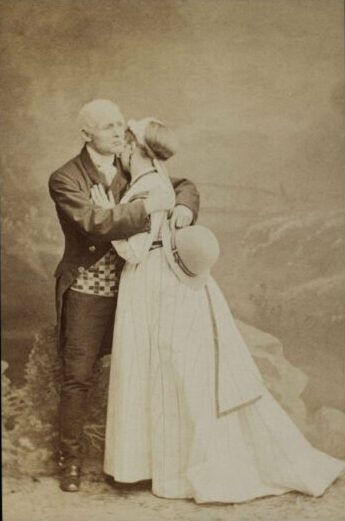
George Belmore and Josephine Fiddes in The Flying Scud in 1886

In 1886 her daughter was in England starring at the New Holborn Theatre with George Belmore in The Flying Scud.

Fiddes died at Frederica's home in Halifax in 1889.
