= A Long Finish =

1998 novel by Michael Dibdin

- First edition
- Author: Michael Dibdin
- Language: English
- Series: Aurelio Zen series, #6
- Genre: Crime, Mystery novel
- Publisher: Faber and Faber
- Publication date: December 1, 1998
- Publication place: United Kingdom
- Media type: Print (Hardback, Paperback)
- Pages: 256pp (hardback) 256pp (paperback)
- ISBN: 0-571-19341-2
- OCLC: 40234264
- Preceded by: Cosi Fan Tutti
- Followed by: Blood Rain

A Long Finish is a 1998 novel by Michael Dibdin, and is the sixth entry in the Aurelio Zen series.

== Synopsis ==
After his adventures under sun-drenched Neapolitan skies in Cosi Fan Tutti, Italian police detective Aurelio Zen finds himself reluctantly back in Rome, sneezing in the damp wine cellar of a retired but still powerful and connected mover and shaker. Strings are pulled and he is given another unorthodox assignment: find evidence that clears the jailed scion of an important wine-growing family, who is accused of brutal murder, in time to harvest what is anticipated to be a great vintage.

Zen is confronted with the closed ranks and closed mouths of a small, remote rural town, where everyone knows the secrets of everyone else. Grappling with tangled relationships, bitter resentments and grudges reaching back to the immediate post-war years, his investigations are further distracted by meeting the young woman who thinks she is his daughter.
