= Dead Lagoon =

1994 novel by Michael Dibdin

- First edition cover
- Author: Michael Dibdin
- Language: English
- Series: Aurelio Zen series, #4
- Genre: Crime, Mystery novel
- Publisher: Faber and Faber
- Publication date: April 18, 1994
- Publication place: United Kingdom
- Media type: Print (Hardback, Paperback)
- Pages: 256pp (hardback) 354pp (paperback)
- ISBN: 0-571-17050-1
- OCLC: 30159112
- Preceded by: Cabal
- Followed by: Cosi Fan Tutti

Dead Lagoon is a 1994 novel by Michael Dibdin and is the fourth in his Aurelio Zen series. It was published by Faber & Faber in the UK and by Pantheon Books the following year in the US.

== Plot ==
Moonlighting, Italian police detective Zen had arranged a winter posting to his run-down home city of Venice. This is in order to investigate the disappearance of American millionaire Ivan Durridge (born in Yugoslavia as Durič) on behalf of his American ex-girlfriend. He needs the extra money to set up home with his new girlfriend Tania in Rome with room for his ageing mother.

At a time when people in authority all over Italy are being prosecuted for corruption, there is a justified suspicion that Enzo Gavagnin, the head of the local Drugs Squad, is implicated. Zen therefore looks for a different case to explain his presence in Venice. He finds it in the complaints of the half crazy countess Ada Zulian that intruders are breaking into her mouldering palazzo, where his mother used to do the cleaning when he was a child. The culprits are her two nephews, anxious to develop a piece of advantageous property that the countess owns. Zen outwits them and is then outwitted by Ada Zulian. She had only wanted their attendance on her needs in old age and now refuses to prosecute them.

Zen is staying at his family's old flat in the Cannaregio district, which has been cleaned up for him by his mother's friend Rosalba. At a family dinner he meets Rosalba's daughter Cristiana Morosini and soon starts an affair with her. Cristiana is the estranged wife of Dal Maschio, leader of the secessionist party Nuova Repubblica Veneta, which has risen in the wake of the Liga Nord and now looks close to success in the coming elections. For reasons of expediency, Cristiana must still appear with her husband on political occasions, however.

The discovery of Gavagnin's body in a cesspit, where he has been drowned after torture, allows Zen to stay on in the city after the successful conclusion of the Zulian case. Following up clues, he finds the skeleton of the missing Durridge on the cemetery island of Sant' Ariano, where it had been dropped from a helicopter. Flushed with success, Zen is planning to move to Venice permanently and set up house with Cristiana when a series of revelations following one after the other destroys his complacency.

He is visited by Maschio, who confesses to having helped carry out the kidnapping of Durridge as a political favour to colleagues in newly independent Croatia. The likelihood of Maschio becoming the new mayor of Venice makes him untouchable and, besides, he has engineered Zen's expulsion in disgrace from Venice. In the meantime he had been using Cristiana to keep an eye on Zen. In revenge Zen tries to turn Maschio's lieutenant Tomasso Saoner against him on the strength of their childhood friendship but only succeeds in driving his former schoolfellow to suicide.

In the final hours, older mysteries dating from World War II are solved. Ada's sanity had first been unhinged by the disappearance of her daughter Rosetta at that period. It now appears that Rosetta had committed suicide and that a Fascist neighbour had buried the body and arranged for the escape of the Jewish Rosa Coin under Rosetta's identity in order to save himself. Then, just as Zen is leaving, an old friend of his father Angelo – who had been reported as killed while fighting in Russia – tells Zen that he had met Angelo in Poland two years before. His father had deserted, stayed behind there and married again.

Thoroughly disillusioned, Zen continues to the train station and, when asked for directions, replies, “I'm sorry, I’m a stranger here myself”.
