= Blood Rain (novel) =

Novel by Michael Dibdin

- First edition
- Author: Michael Dibdin
- Language: English
- Series: Aurelio Zen series, #7
- Genre: Crime, Mystery novel
- Publisher: Faber and Faber
- Publication date: 20 September 1999
- Publication place: United Kingdom
- Media type: Print (Hardback, Paperback)
- Pages: 284pp (hardback)
- ISBN: 0-571-20089-3
- OCLC: 41504750
- Preceded by: A Long Finish
- Followed by: And Then You Die

Blood Rain is a novel by Michael Dibdin, and is the seventh in the Aurelio Zen series. It was published in 1999 by Faber & Faber. In it Zen, an Italian police detective, is pitted against the Sicilian Mafia and at the end is the subject of a bombing attack for political reasons.

== Plot ==
Aurelio Zen gets a posting to Sicily, where he is asked to report to Rome on the work of the Direzione Investagitiva AntiMafia (DIA). Carla, his adopted daughter is there too, setting up police computers, and discovers that someone has a backdoor into the data there. She is also enjoying a flirtation with Corinna Nunziatella, an elaborately guarded woman magistrate who is also investigating the Mafia. Before this can proceed far, they are ambushed on a mountain road and their car is bombed.

Zen has meanwhile been called back to Rome by the news of his mother's approaching death. This, coupled to news of Carla's death, temporarily puts him out of action, and when he returns to his headquarters in Catania he is given a clue that not everything is as it seems by a file that Corinna had sent him, supposedly as a birthday gift for Carla. This points to irregularities in the investigation of the murder of a Mafia chieftain's son and a possible Roman "third level" aiming to destabilise the powers of the old clans.

Zen is more than usually at sea in the Sicilian atmosphere of double-cross and ambiguous messages in which it looks as if his own side is out to kill him. Finally he risks being taken for cross-examination by the Don of a declining clan who suspects Zen of murdering one of his henchmen. He convinces Don Gaspare that the actual murderer was a police agent who Zen had later shot. On his way back to Catania the police take revenge by blowing up the car in which he is riding.

== Critical reception ==
Kirkus Reviews described the book as "Cunning, bloody, and irresistible".
