= Thanksgiving (novel) =

Novel by Michael Dibdin

- Author: Michael Dibdin
- Language: English
- Published: 2000, Faber & Faber
- Publication place: United Kingdom
- Media type: Print
- Pages: 179 pages
- ISBN: 0571204848

Thanksgiving is a 2000 fiction novel by British author Michael Dibdin. The book was first published in the United Kingdom on 2 October 2000 through Faber & Faber. The book follows a man who decides to visit his dead wife's first husband.

== Synopsis ==
During their marriage Lucy never said much about her past, so when Lucy dies during a horrific plane crash Tom decides to try to find out exactly what happened in her first marriage. He knows that she had two children by him, but Lucy was very close-mouthed about anything else that pertained to Darryl Bob Allen. However the more Anthony looks into Lucy's past, the more obsessed he grows.

== Reception ==
Critical reception for Thanksgiving was mostly positive. The Guardian gave Thanksgiving a positive review, commenting that while the book did not fully answer all of the questions it posed, that this was purposely done since the book was predominantly about "one man's voyage into darkness, into both the impossibility and the ecstasy of love". Publishers Weekly also praised the book, but noted that "Fans may go along for the ride, but they will surely clamor for the speedy return of Aurelio Zen." In contrast, the Post-Gazette criticized Thanksgiving as being unbelievable and questioned the point of the novel.
