= Back to Bologna =

2005 novel by Michael Dibdin

- First edition
- Author: Michael Dibdin
- Language: English
- Series: Aurelio Zen series, #10
- Genre: Crime, Mystery novel
- Publisher: Faber and Faber
- Publication date: August 4, 2005
- Publication place: United Kingdom
- Media type: Print (Hardback, Paperback)
- Pages: 176pp (hardback) 240pp (paperback)
- ISBN: 0-571-22775-9
- OCLC: 59877901
- Dewey Decimal: 823.914 22
- LC Class: PR6054.I26 B33 2005
- Preceded by: Medusa
- Followed by: End Games

Back to Bologna is a 2005 novel by Michael Dibdin, and is the tenth entry in the popular Aurelio Zen series.

== Plot ==
Zen, an Italian police detective, is on sick leave after a stomach operation and is feeling a shadow of himself. His relationship with his partner, Gemma, is also not going well. She is about to leave for Bologna to meet her son who has something important to tell her.

Meanwhile, Zen is recalled to duty and is sent to be the liaison officer for a high-profile murder investigation - in Bologna – where the local football team owner has been shot, as well as stabbed with a Parmesan knife.

Whilst in Bologna, Gemma manages to get tickets to watch a live cook-off between local academic celebrity Edgardo Ugo and singing TV chef Romano Rinaldi, 'Lo Chef Che Canta e Incanta', provoked by Ugo suggesting, in a newspaper article, that Lo Chef can't cook. A series of coincidences leads to Zen being arrested when Ugo is found shot in the wake of the hilariously disastrous event.

The other main characters include a couple of flatmates – a student of Ugo's and a rich kid who fancies himself an 'Ultra' football fan – and the student's illegal immigrant girlfriend, who calls herself Princess Flavia of Ruritania, as well as the world's worst private detective, who fancies himself a Chandleresque Private Eye.

This is Zen at the centre of a black comedy.
