= A Soldier Relating His Exploits in a Tavern =

Painting by John Cawse

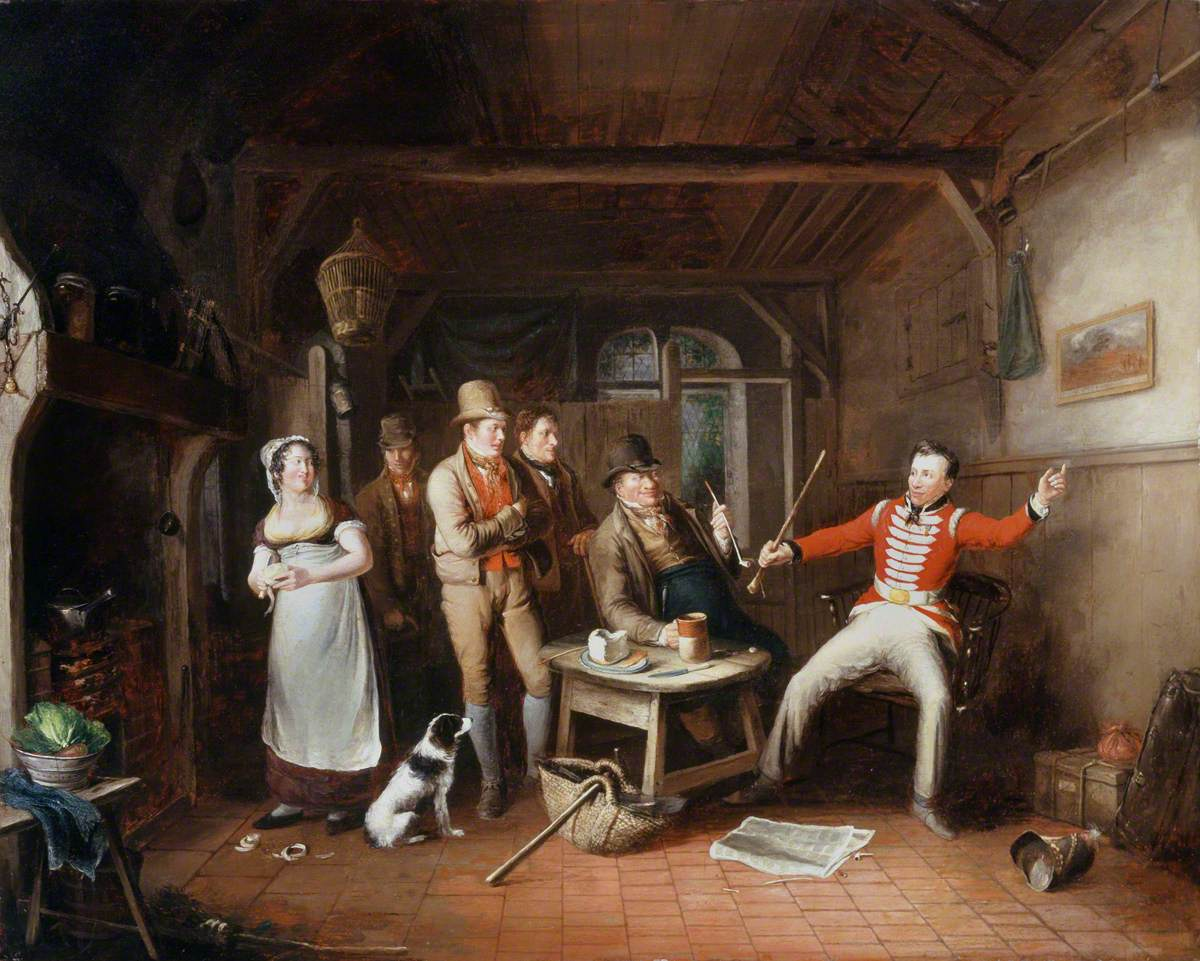
- Artist: John Cawse
- Year: 1821
- Type: Oil on panel, genre painting
- Dimensions: 32.4 cm × 50.2 cm (12.8 in × 19.8 in)
- Location: National Army Museum; Chelsea

A Soldier Relating His Exploits in a Tavern is an 1821 genre painting by the British artist John Cawse. It depicts a scene in a inn where an infantrymen of the British Army is regaling the others present with his stories of military service. As he is wearing a Waterloo Medal and gestures towards an print on the wall he is clearly speaking of his participation of the Hundred Days campaign of 1815.

It conformed to a popular perception that soldiers and veterans were naturally at home in public houses. The painting is today in the collection of the National Army Museum in Chelsea, having been acquired in 1992.

== Bibliography ==
- Forrest, Alan I. Waterloo. Oxford University Press, 2015.
- Lalumia, Matthew Paul. Realism and Politics in Victorian Art of the Crimean War. UMI Research Press, 1984.
- McLoughlin, Catherine Mary. Veteran Poetics: British Literature in the Age of Mass Warfare, 1790-2015.Cambridge University Press, 2018.
