= Vendetta (Dibdin novel) =

1990 Aurelio Zen crime novel by Michael Dibdin

- First edition
- Author: Michael Dibdin
- Language: English
- Series: Aurelio Zen series, #2
- Genre: Crime, Mystery novel
- Publisher: Faber and Faber
- Publication date: 4 June 1990
- Publication place: United Kingdom
- Media type: Print (Hardback, Paperback)
- Pages: 336pp (hardback) 288pp (paperback)
- ISBN: 0-571-14332-6
- OCLC: 21600618
- Preceded by: Ratking
- Followed by: Cabal

Vendetta is a 1990 novel by Michael Dibdin, and is the second book in the popular Aurelio Zen series.

Zen has earned a return to the fold of actual police work, but now officials in a high government ministry are desperate to finger someone—anyone—for the murder of an eccentric billionaire, whose corrupt dealings have enriched some of the most exalted figures in Italian politics. However, Oscar Burolo's murder would seem to be not just unsolvable but impossible. The magnate was killed on a heavily fortified Sardinian estate, where every room was monitored by video cameras. Those cameras captured Burolo's grisly death, but not the face of his killer.

Zen grapples, in his idiosyncratic fashion, with this apparent "locked door" mystery by launching an ill-advised solo undercover investigation, among the fallout from which he is confronted by an almost forgotten face from the past, who now stalks him with vengeful intent.

== TV adaptation ==
The novel was adapted as the first episode of the BBC television series Zen, starring Rufus Sewell in the title role. It was aired in January 2011.
