= End Games =

2007 novel by Michael Dibdin

- First edition cover
- Author: Michael Dibdin
- Language: English
- Series: Aurelio Zen series, #11
- Genre: Crime, Mystery novel
- Publisher: Faber and Faber
- Publication date: July 5, 2007
- Publication place: United Kingdom
- Media type: Print (Hardback, Paperback)
- Pages: 356pp (hardback)
- ISBN: 0-571-23615-4
- OCLC: 85829301
- Preceded by: Back to Bologna

End Games is a 2007 novel by Michael Dibdin. It is the 11th and last entry in the Aurelio Zen series.

== Plot ==
Police detective Aurelio Zen is posted to remote Calabria, at the toe of the Italian boot. Beneath the surface of a tight-knit, traditional community, he discovers that violent forces are at work. There has been a brutal murder and Zen is determined to find a way to penetrate the code of silence, to uncover the truth, but his assignment is complicated by another secret which has drawn strangers from the other side of the world - a hunt for ancient buried treasure, launched by a single-minded player with millions to spend pursuing his bizarre and deadly obsession.
