= Medusa (Dibdin novel) =

Novel by Michael Dibdin

- First edition
- Author: Michael Dibdin
- Language: English
- Series: Aurelio Zen series, #9
- Genre: Crime, Mystery novel
- Publisher: Faber and Faber
- Publication date: August 7, 2003
- Publication place: United Kingdom
- Media type: Print (Hardback, Paperback)
- Pages: 292pp (hardback) 288pp (paperback)
- ISBN: 0-571-21658-7
- OCLC: 52327448
- Preceded by: And Then You Die
- Followed by: Back to Bologna

Medusa is a 2003 novel by Michael Dibdin, and is the ninth entry in the popular Aurelio Zen series about an Italian police detective.

== Plot ==
When a group of Austrian cavers exploring in the Italian Alps comes across human remains at the bottom of a deep shaft, everyone assumes the death was accidental. But then the body is removed from the morgue and the Defence Ministry puts a news blackout on the case. Smelling a rat, and seeing an opportunity to embarrass their political rivals in the run-up to a cabinet change, the Ministry of the Interior puts Aurelio Zen onto the case.

The search for the truth leads him into the turbulent political history of Italy during the seventies and also into obscure corners of modern-day affluent society, exposing the sordid details of a crime that everyone else had forgotten.

The story is told from the view points of several of those involved and the action moves between Rome, the extreme northern province of Alto Adige, an Italian enclave and tax haven in Switzerland, and several provincial Italian cities.

The focus is on movement, rather than the methodical application of the police process; Zen takes short cuts with the latter and arrives at the solution in a rush.
