= K. K. Beck =

American novelist

- Born: 1950 (age 75–76)
- Occupation: Novelist
- Spouse: Michael Dibdin (died 2007)
- Writing career
- Pen name: Marie Oliver; K. K. Beck

Kathrine Kristine Beck (born 1950), known mainly by her pen name of K. K. Beck, is an American novelist. She has written over a dozen books, some of which were part of the Iris Cooper novel series and the Jane da Silva novel series. Her novels were published between 1984 and 1999.

An early novel of hers, Death of a Prom Queen (1984) was written under the pen name of Marie Oliver. She wrote a series of other novels, under the name K. K. Beck, such as The Revenge of Kali-Ra in 1999. One of her most recent works, The Tell-Tale Tattoo and Other Stories (2002), is a collection of short stories.

She appeared on the quiz show Jeopardy! on September 3, 1991 (under the name Katherine Marris), finishing in third place in her game.

She lives in Seattle, Washington, and was married to the crime-writer Michael Dibdin, who died in 2007.
