= Abigail Betts =

British singer (1800–1867)

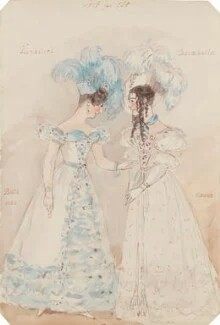
- with Mary Cawse in 1828 (by Alfred Edward Chalon)
- Born: 1800; London
- Died: 4 May 1866 (aged 65–66); Kennington
- Known for: Singing

Abigail Betts known as Miss Betts (1800 – 4 May 1866) was a British singer who took leading roles at London theatres.

== Life ==
Betts was probably born in London as she was baptised at St Giles-in-the-Fields in Holborn. Her family were violin makers and her uncles business was left to her father and her brothers continued the business.

In about 1828 Alfred Edward Chalon created a watercolour of her and the singer Mary Cawse taken from their English Opera House performance of "Tit For Tat" in 1828. Tit for Tat was based on Mozart's Cosi Fan Tulle. Chalon's watercolour is in the National Portrait Gallery in London.

Her best role was said to have been as the Gypsy Queen in Michael William Balfe's very successful opera The Bohemian Girl. She first took the role in 1843 when it was first presented at the Theatre Royal, Drury Lane. This was not the main role in the opera but she was known for this creation.

== Death and private life ==
Betts died at her home in 1866 in Kennington Green. She had never married. There is a supposition that she was the mistress of the Marquess of Anglesey.
