= John Cawse =

British painter (1778-1862)

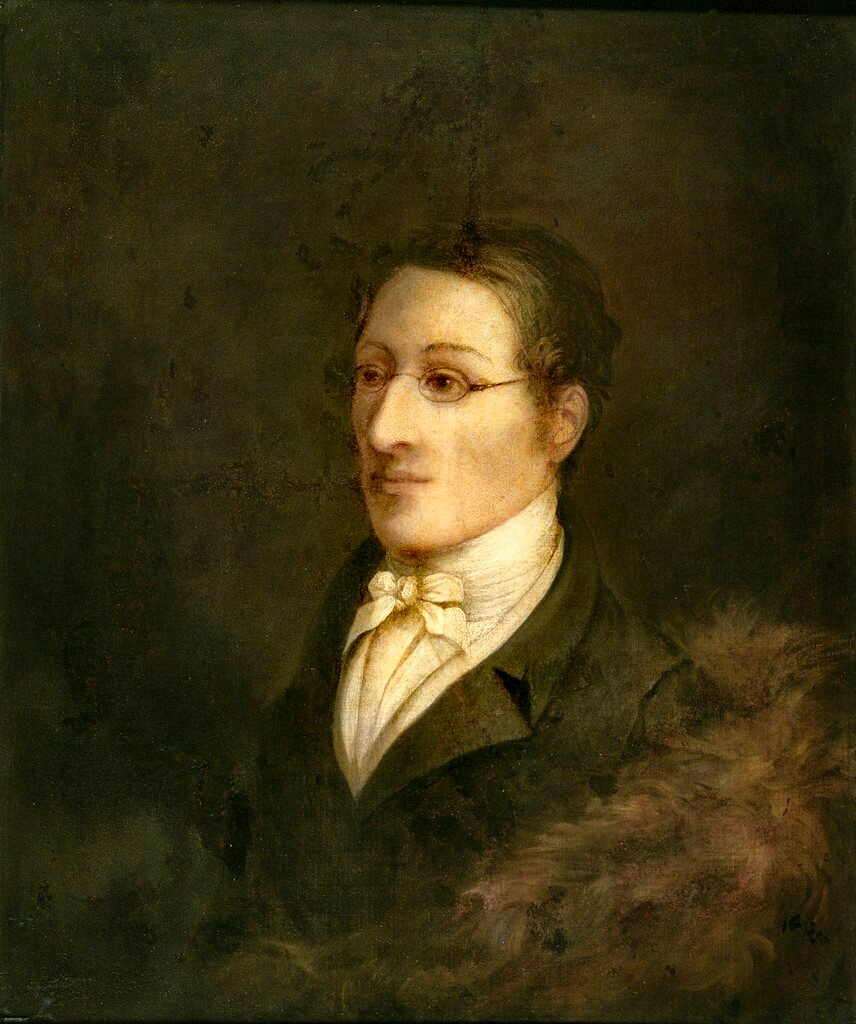
Portrait of Carl Maria von Weber by Cawse in 1826.

John Cawse (25 December 1778 – 19 January 1862) was a British painter and caricaturist.

== Life ==
Cawse was born on 25 December 1778, the son of Charles Woodruffe Cawse and his wife Mary, of Little Prescott Street, Whitechapel. His father described himself in his will as a "Staymaker and Dealer in Whale Fins".

Early in his career he was employed to draw caricatures by the print publisher SW Fores. He exhibited at the Royal Academy from 1802, showing mostly portraits, but also some paintings of horses and, from the early 1830s, a few historical pictures. Between 1807 and 1845 he exhibited at the British Institution, predominantly showing literary and historical subjects, including scenes from the works of Shakespeare and Walter Scott. His portrait of the clown Joseph Grimaldi is in the collection of the National Portrait Gallery and his 1826 painting of Carl Maria von Weber is in that of the Royal College of Music.

He is best remembered for his book The Art of Painting Portraits, Landscapes, Animals, Draperies, &c., in oil colours, published in 1840. He was an amateur musician who, unusually for the time, played the antiquated viola da gamba (i.e. the bass viol); an instrument he once owned is in the Victoria and Albert Museum.

== Family ==
He married Mary Fraser; two of their daughters, Mary and Harriet Cawse, became opera singers; another, Clarissa Sabina, was a miniature painter

== Gallery ==
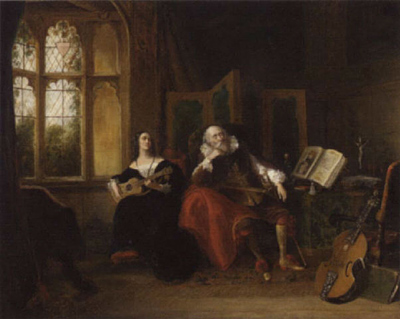
On her Spanish guitar, she played a ditty which lulled her old guardian to sleep, 19th century

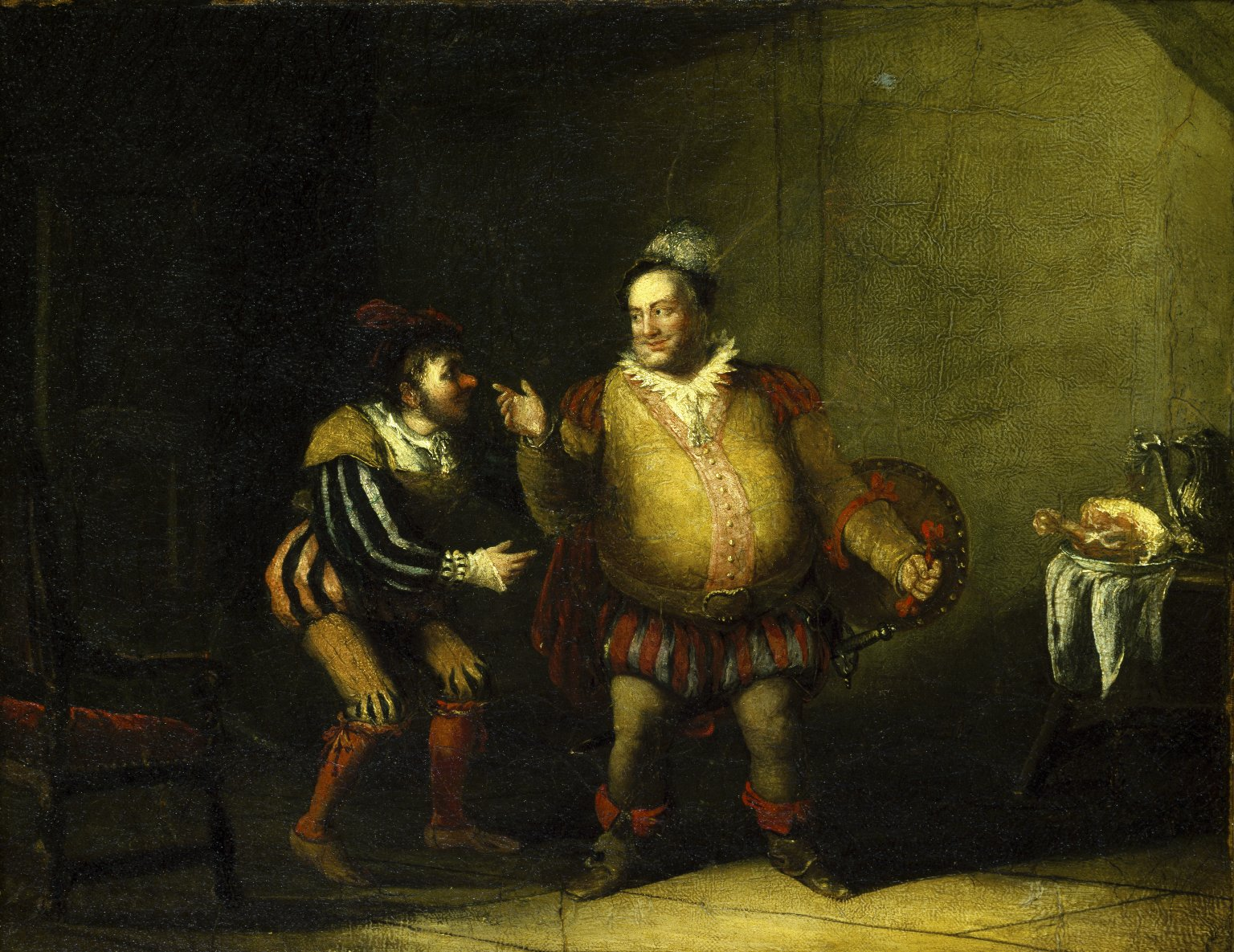
Falstaff ridiculing Bardolph's nose, c. 1820

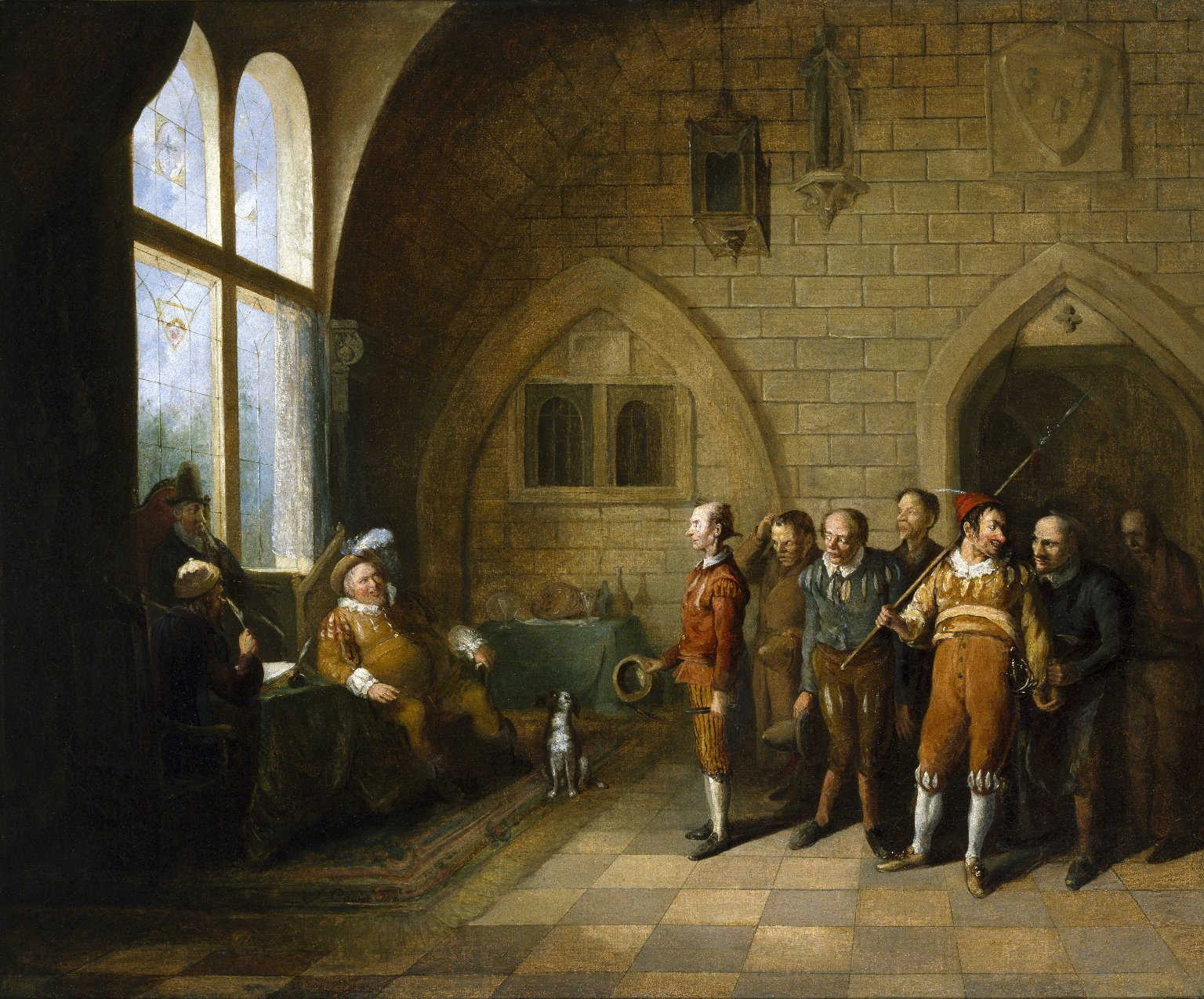
Falstaff choosing his recruits, 1818

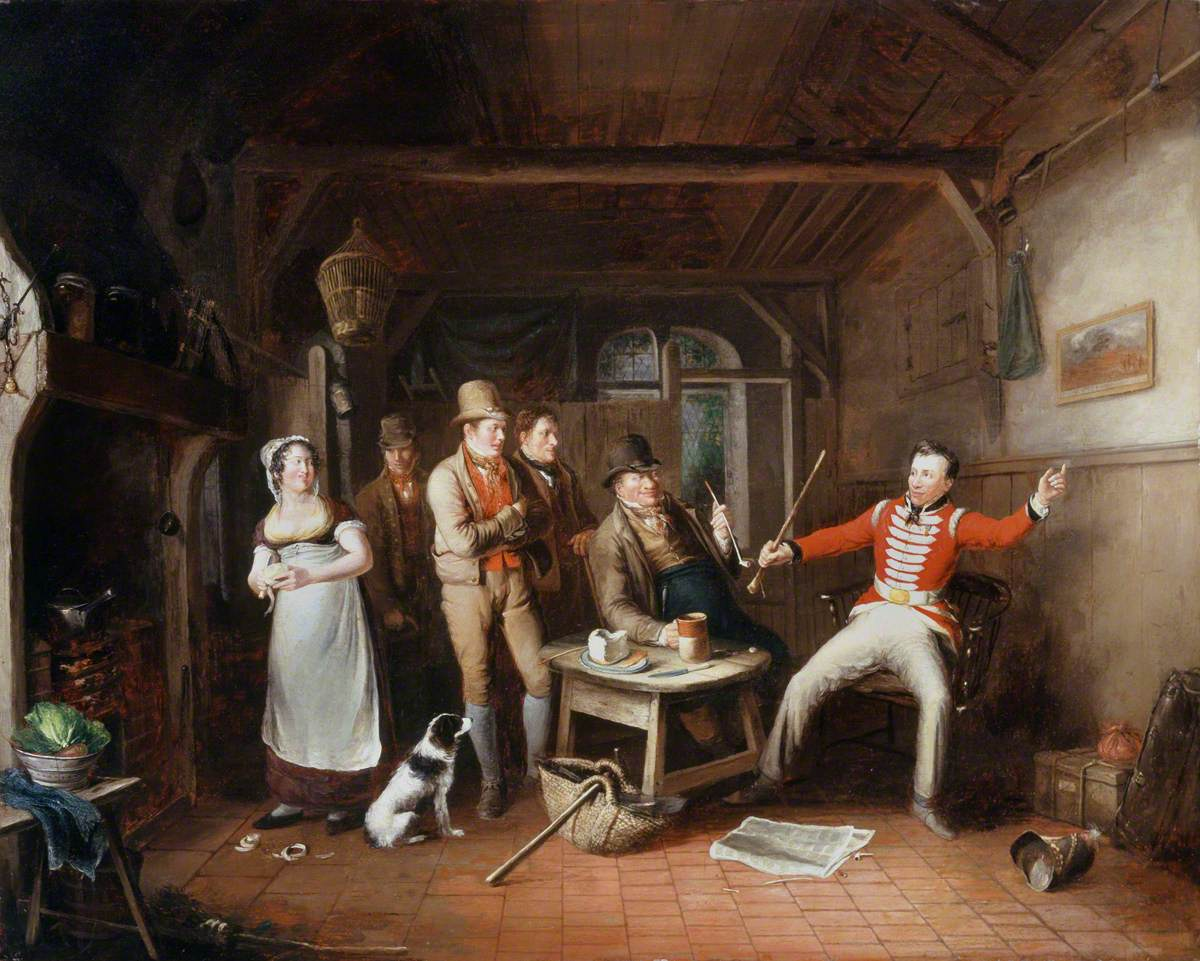
A Soldier Relating His Exploits in a Tavern, 1821

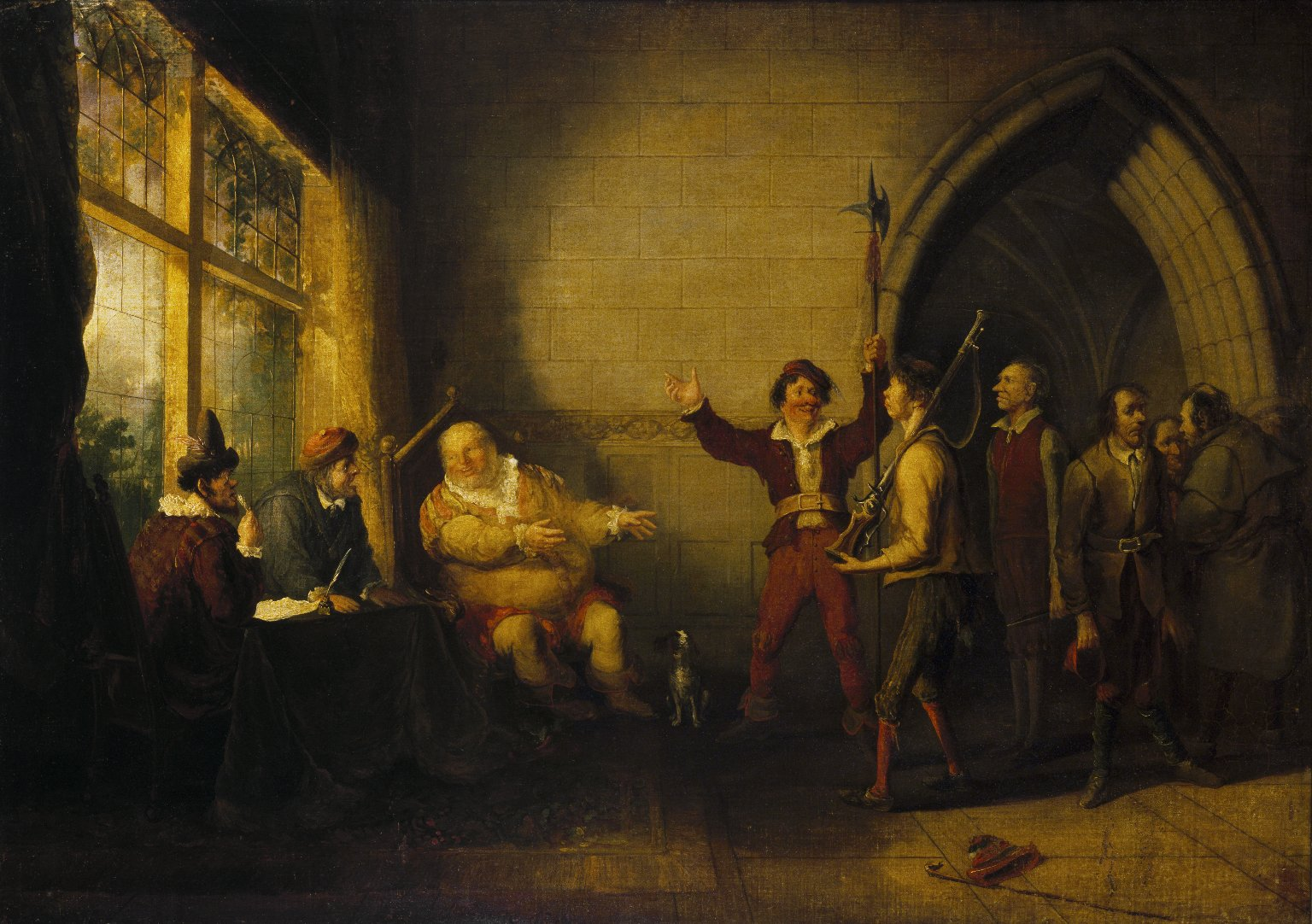
Bardolph and Falstaff putting Wart through the drill, 1827?

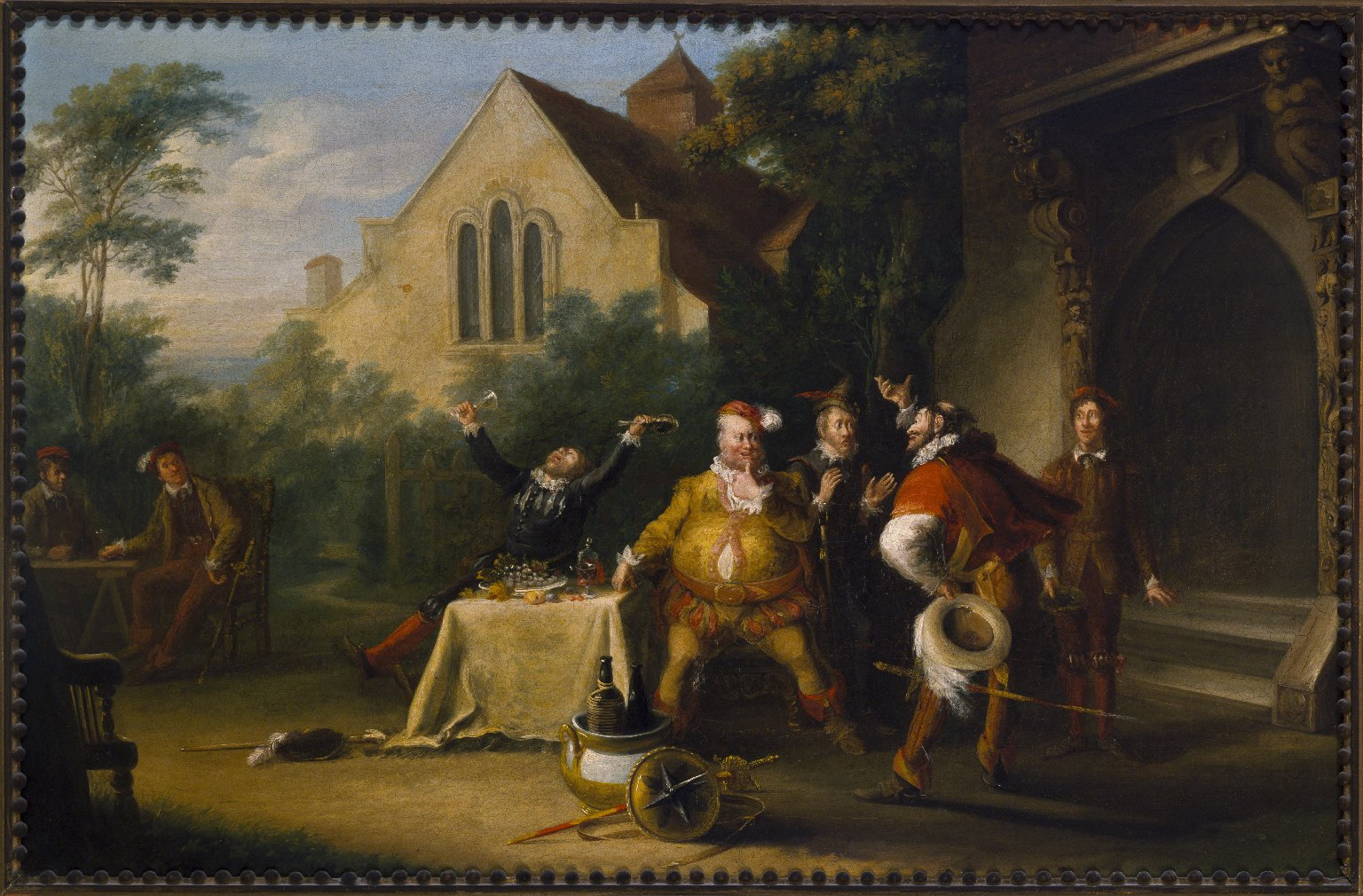
Pistol announcing to Falstaff the death of the King, c. 1820

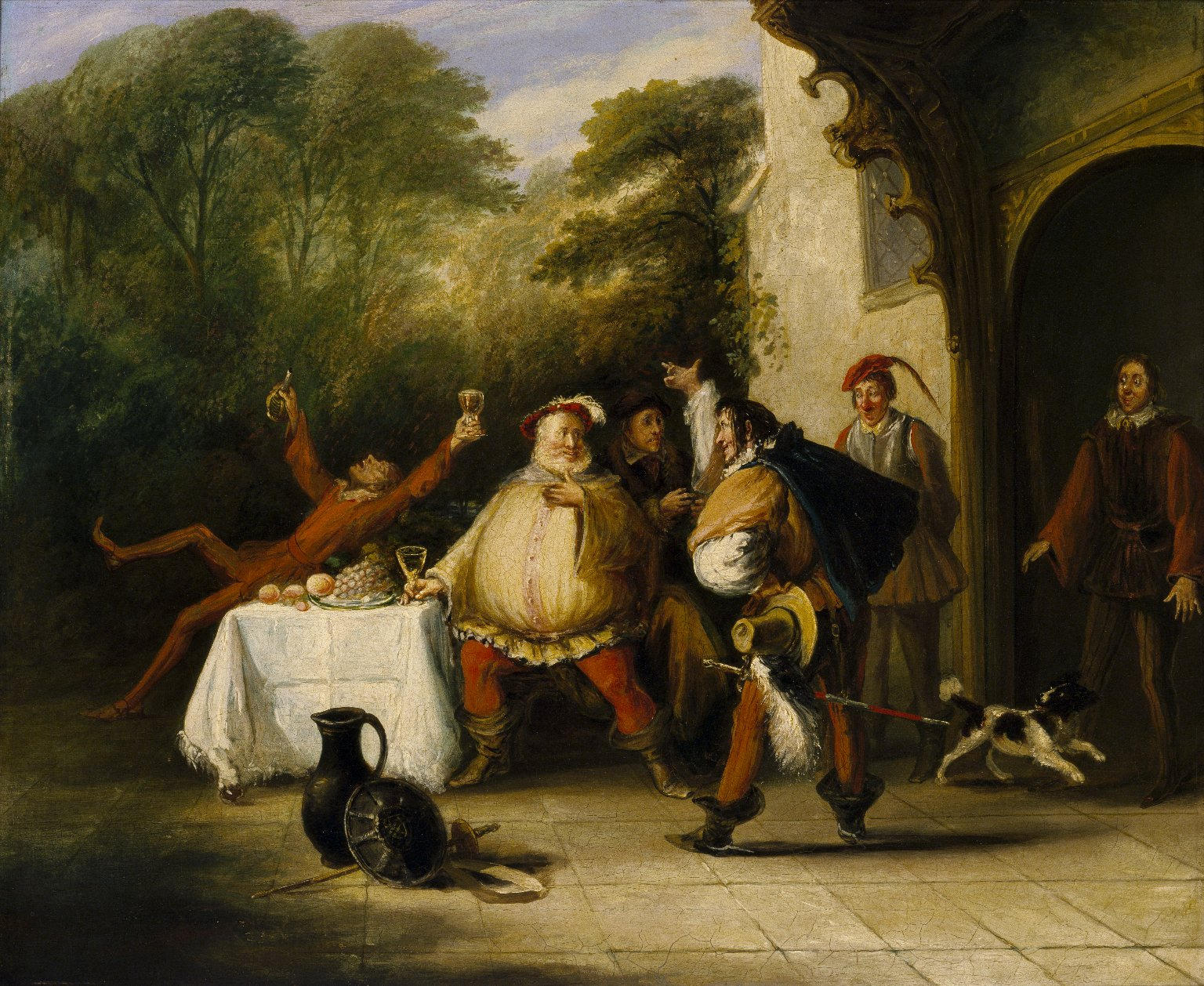
Pistol announcing to Falstaff the death of the King, c. 1820s

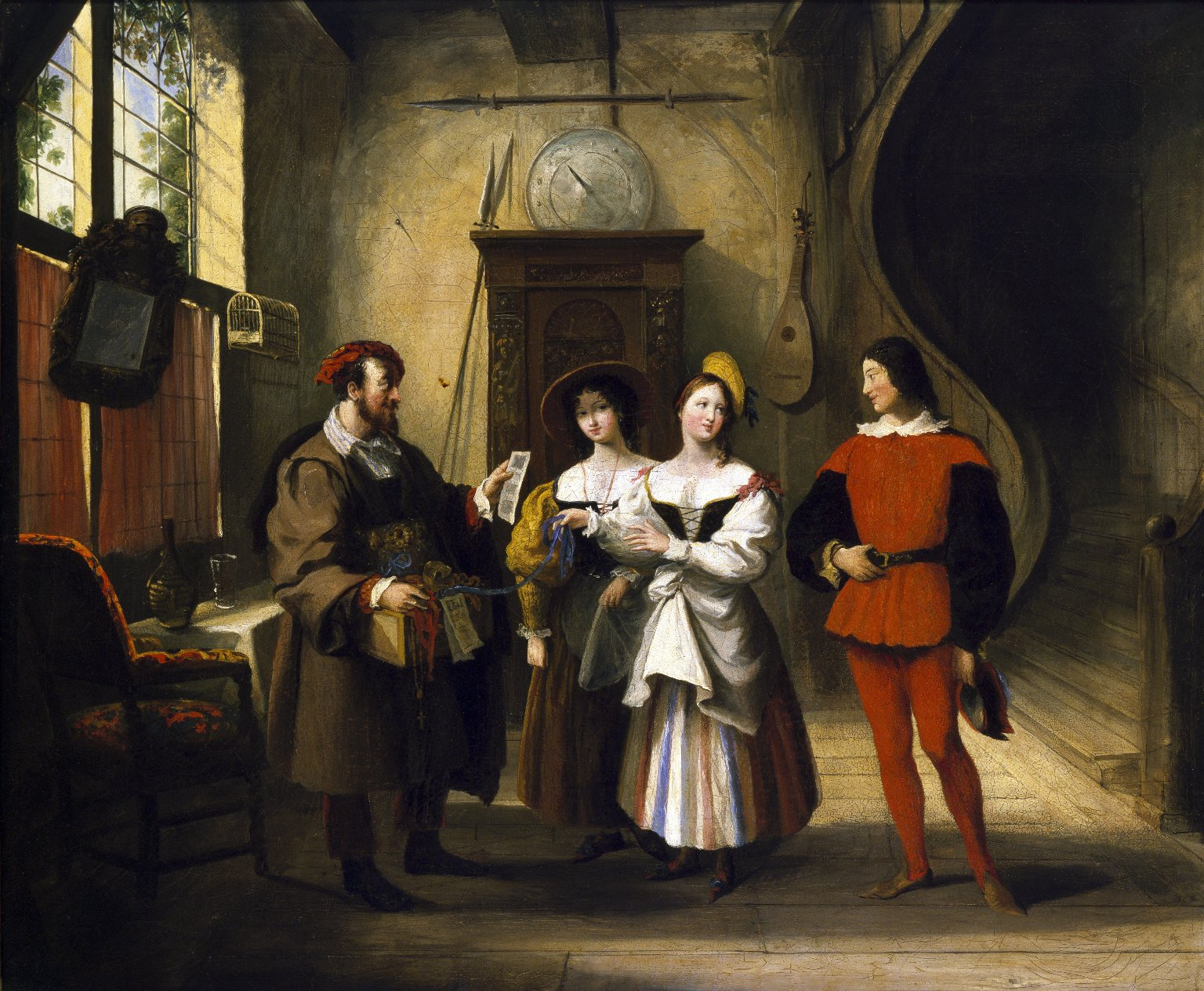
Autolycus selling his wares, c. 1830
