= Ratking (novel) =

1988 novel by Michael Dibdin

- First edition
- Author: Michael Dibdin
- Language: English
- Series: Aurelio Zen series, #1
- Genre: Crime, Mystery novel
- Publisher: Faber and Faber
- Publication date: April 5, 1988
- Publication place: United Kingdom
- Media type: Print (Hardback, Paperback)
- Pages: 288 pp (hardback) 292 (paperback)
- ISBN: 0-571-15147-7
- OCLC: 17262947
- Followed by: Vendetta

Ratking is a 1988 novel by Michael Dibdin, and is the first book in the popular Aurelio Zen series, introducing readers to the Italian police commissario's morally shady world. On publication it won the Crime Writers' Association Gold Dagger for fiction.

== Plot ==
Police Commissioner Aurelio Zen has crossed swords with the establishment before - and lost. From the depths of a mundane desk job in Rome counting paperclips, to which he has been exiled through political fallout from the Aldo Moro kidnapping and murder, he is unexpectedly transferred to Perugia. Unbeknownst to him, favours have been called in and words have been whispered into ears. He is to take over a kidnapping case involving one of Italy's most powerful families, with control of a business empire at stake. The missing head of the family is a big benefactor of one of Italy's main political parties and pressure is being applied. Zen contends with local power politics and troubled relationships with his mother and girlfriend, while employing some distinctly unorthodox methods and skirting the borderline of the permissible in a race to get results before he is removed from the case through political pressure.

== TV adaptation ==
The novel was adapted for television by the BBC, starring Rufus Sewell in the title role. It was aired in January 2011.
