= Michael Dibdin =

British writer (1947–2007)

Michael Dibdin (21 March 1947 – 30 March 2007) was a British crime fiction writer, best known for inventing Aurelio Zen, the principal character in 11 crime novels set in Italy.

== Early life ==
Dibdin was born in Wolverhampton, Staffordshire (now West Midlands), England. The son of a physicist, he was brought up from the age of seven in Lisburn, Northern Ireland, where he attended the Friends' School and was taught by James Simmons. He graduated with a degree in English from Sussex University, and then went to study for a Master's degree at the University of Alberta in Edmonton, Alberta, Canada.

== Career ==
After publishing his first novel, a Sherlock Holmes pastiche, he lived for four years in Italy, teaching at the university in Perugia.

Dibdin is best known for his Aurelio Zen mysteries, set in Italy. The first of these, Ratking, won the Crime Writer's Association Gold Dagger Award for the Best Crime Novel of 1988. This series of detective novels provide a penetrating insight into the less visible aspects of Italian society over the last two decades of the 20th century and the start of the 21st. The earlier books have a lightness of touch that gradually becomes much darker. The character of Zen himself is anti-heroic, which adds much to the books' irony and black humour. A final Zen book, End Games, appeared posthumously in July 2007.

He also wrote other detective works set in America and in the UK and published reviews and other essays in The Independent and The Observer.

== Personal life ==
Dibdin eventually settled in Seattle, Washington, United States.

Dibdin was married three times, most recently to the novelist K. K. Beck. He died in Seattle on 30 March 2007, aged 60, following a short illness.

== Published works ==
=== Aurelio Zen series ===
1. Ratking (1988)
2. Vendetta (1990)
3. Cabal (1992)
4. Dead Lagoon (1994)
5. Cosi Fan Tutti (1996)
6. A Long Finish (1998)
7. Blood Rain (1999)
8. And Then You Die (2002)
9. Medusa (2003)
10. Back to Bologna (2005)
11. End Games (2007)

=== Other books ===
- The Last Sherlock Holmes Story (1978)
- A Rich Full Death (1986)
- The Tryst (1989)
- Dirty Tricks (1991)
- The Dying of the Light (1993)
- Dark Spectre (1995) ISBN 0-571-17523-6
- Thanksgiving (2000)
