= And Then You Die (novel) =

2002 novel by Michael Dibdin

- First edition
- Author: Michael Dibdin
- Language: English
- Series: Aurelio Zen series, #8
- Genre: Crime, Mystery novel
- Publisher: Faber and Faber
- Publication date: April 1, 2002
- Publication place: United Kingdom
- Media type: Print (Hardback, Paperback)
- Pages: 256pp (hardback) 192pp (paperback)
- ISBN: 0-571-21032-5
- OCLC: 48194229
- Preceded by: Blood Rain
- Followed by: Medusa

And Then You Die is a 2002 novel by Michael Dibdin, and is the eighth entry in the popular Aurelio Zen series.

== Plot ==
Aurelio Zen is back, but nobody's supposed to know it...After months in hospital recovering from a bomb attack on his car, Zen is lying low under a false name at a beach resort on the Tuscan coast, waiting to testify in an imminent high-profile Mafia trial. He has clear instructions: to sit back and enjoy the classic Italian beach holiday. But Zen is getting restless, despite a developing romance with a mysterious and alluring occupant of a nearby sunbed, as an alarming number of people seem to be dropping dead around him. Abruptly, the pleasant monotony of beach life is cut short as the word comes and he finds himself transported to a remote and strange world far from home...where he belatedly comes to appreciate both the reach of those who want him dead and that the corpses were all supposed to be his.

As ever in the Zen chronicles, the real story turns out to be much more complex. Confronted by an unexpected and unconsidered adversary, he resolves the immediate situation at the cost of involving his new girlfriend in a plot to dispose of an inconvenient corpse.

== Review ==
It appears, Michael Dibdin's few years' sojourn in Italy reflects in his book as he writes about Italian culture, regions, food, and people. The country, in fact, becomes a part of the story. The shortness of the book compared to his other Zen thrillers makes it look like a novella. The eighth book in Dibdin's Aurelio Zen series, the short novel promises to be a carefully crafted and witty chronicle of the Venice-born detective's latest adventures, an equally rewarding sequel to the last Zen thriller, the Blood Rain.
