= Cabal (Dibdin novel) =

1992 novel by Michael Dibdin

- First edition
- Author: Michael Dibdin
- Language: English
- Series: Aurelio Zen series, #3
- Genre: Crime, Mystery novel
- Publisher: Faber and Faber
- Publication date: May 26, 1992
- Publication place: United Kingdom
- Media type: Print (Hardback, Paperback)
- Pages: 288pp (hardback) 288pp (paperback)
- ISBN: 0-571-16616-4
- OCLC: 26547811
- Preceded by: Vendetta
- Followed by: Dead Lagoon

Cabal is a 1992 novel by Michael Dibdin and the third entry in the Aurelio Zen series.

When, one dark night in November, Prince Ludovico Ruspanti fell a hundred and fifty feet to his death in the chapel at St. Peter's Basilica, Rome, there were a number of questions to be answered. The answer the Vatican housekeepers want is rubber-stamped suicide. Zen, whose bad luck it is to be on call that night, is keen to oblige and return to his girlfriend Tania's bed. Unfortunately for him, things turn out to be not that simple and he finds that getting the real answers is by no means easy, as witness after witness is mysteriously silenced - by death. To crack the secret of the Vatican, Zen must penetrate the most secret place of all, the fabled Cabal. How much of a threat does it represent? How far could it reach? Does it even exist?

== TV adaptation ==
The novel was adapted for television by the BBC, starring Rufus Sewell in the title role. It was aired in January 2011.
