= Cosi Fan Tutti =

1996 novel by Michael Dibdin

- First edition
- Author: Michael Dibdin
- Language: English
- Series: Aurelio Zen series, #5
- Genre: Crime, Mystery novel
- Publisher: Faber and Faber
- Publication date: 1996
- Publication place: United Kingdom
- Media type: Print (Hardback, Paperback)
- Pages: 332pp (hardback)
- ISBN: 0-571-17920-7
- OCLC: 36046751
- Dewey Decimal: 823/.914 21
- LC Class: PR6054.I26 C67 1996
- Preceded by: Dead Lagoon
- Followed by: A Long Finish

Cosi Fan Tutti is a novel by Michael Dibdin published by Faber and Faber in 1996. The fifth in his Aurelio Zen series, it is set in Naples. One strand of the plot plays on the storyline of the Mozart comic opera Così fan tutte; in addition, the chapter titles are all taken from the Lorenzo Da Ponte's libretto for that opera.

== Plot ==
At odds with his superiors again, Italian police detective Zen has asked for a transfer and thinks he has found himself a backwater sinecure in Naples. In return for a quiet life with pastries and a cappuccino on his desk every morning, he is prepared to tolerate all manner of scams, not the least of which is a brothel on the top floor of the harbour police station of which he is nominally in command. Though the recent “Clean Hands” agitation has brought down institutionalized political corruption elsewhere in Italy, it appears to be making little difference in Naples - until, that is, the slogan Strade Pullite (clean streets) begins appearing on walls. Then, in its wake, sanitation department personnel begin a campaign of sweeping away suspect politicians, shady businessmen and eminent mafiosi in their trucks.

Zen, instead of bringing those responsible to justice, has taken on the pseudonym of Alfonso Zembla and is devoting his time to sorting out the affairs of his landlady's daughters, Filomena and Orestina Squillace. They are in love with the hoodlums Gesualdo and Sabatino, who are passionately devoted to them in return. Zen's solution is to send the girls on a package trip to London and in their absence to test the constancy of their boyfriends. To this end he recruits the prostitutes Iolanda and Libera, who are posing as illegal immigrants from Albania, and introduces them to the deserted lovers.

But Zen has not been able to avoid all his professional duties. He has had to arrest a mysterious American seaman for stabbing a Greek sailor, but his prisoner has escaped. In the course of his pursuit, Zen is mistakenly attacked by the Strade Pullite operatives, thrown into their truck and almost crushed among the rubbish. It is Gesualdo and Sabatino (who are actually investigating a war between local crime factions) who come to his rescue. Zen is then presented fictitiously at a press conference by the Naples Questore (police chief) as specially recruited to work undercover in his own operation against organized crime.

Explanations tying together all the subplots are made during the course of a final party, at which the romantic business is settled satisfactorily, although Zen is confronted with the reproaches of his mother, his ex-wife Luisella and his former partner Tania. A chance remark, however, compels Signora Zen to collapse and confess to one of the party-goers disguised as a priest that in reality Aurelio was her son by a clothes manufacturer who supplied uniforms to the Blackshirts.

== Reception ==
Rather than an excuse for mere local colour, the Italian settings of the Zen novels have been noted as crucial to both their plots and themes. Though the setting is Neapolitan in the case of Cosi Fan Tutti, the author's descriptions of the city's "winding streets, courtyards, piazzas, staircases and narrow archways and alleys mirror Dibdin's representation of the labyrinthine social and political world of Italy".

Here, however, the plot is taken further into fantasy by making the affairs of the daughters of Zen's landlady parody the theme of Mozart's similarly named Cosi fan tutte (That's the way the world goes), which was also set in Naples. "As in the best farces," one reviewer commented, "practically everybody, including Zen, turns out to be in disguise - though the outrageous variety of masquerades ranges far beyond anything Mozart ever thought of." Marcel Berlins of The Times concluded "Perhaps the book is a touch self-indulgently clever; but all is forgiven when the resultant virtuosity provides such great pleasure."

On the other hand, Mark Chu rather deprecates Dibdin's humour, claiming it was based on "banal stereotypes of Italian, and especially southern Italian, character" which is ultimately dependent on the long-established British perception of Italy as the setting for "opera buffa, laziness, irrationality, superstition, violence, resignation and political life viewed cynically as a question of the survival of the strongest and fittest".
