= List of female detective characters =

This is a list of fictional female investigators from novels, short stories, radio, television, films and video games.

== A ==
- Laura Ackroyd is an investigative reporter who solves crimes in West Yorkshire with her boyfriend DCI Michael Thackery in a book series begun by Patricia Hall (Maureen O’Connor) in 1994.
- Abigail Adams, future first lady, detects in 1770s Massachusetts in a series by Barbara Hambly (as Barbara Hamilton) began in 2009.
- Hilda Adams is a nurse who takes jobs to investigate, in series by Mary Roberts Rinehart, begun in 1914 with The Buckled Bag; played by Joan Blondell in a Warner Bros. film, Miss Pinkerton (1932). Rinehart then adopted this movie nickname for use in her Adams stories.
- Portia Constance Adams is a Canadian amateur detective who mysteriously inherits the 221B Baker Street townhouse in 1930 in a book series by Canadian Angela Misri launched 2014.
- Riley Adams CSI: Crime Scene Investigation
- Irene Adler is an opera singer in the short story "A Scandal in Bohemia" by Arthur Conan Doyle begun in 1891; later appeared as a Pinkerton detective in a series of books by Carole Nelson Douglas begun in 1990, played by Charlotte Rampling in Sherlock Holmes in New York (1976 film); by Anne Baxter in The Masks of Death (1984 TV movie); by Gayle Hunnicutt in Sherlock Holmes (1984 TV series pilot); by Morgan Fairchild in Sherlock Holmes and the Leading Lady (1992 TV movie); by Rachel McAdams in Sherlock Holmes (2009 film); by Lara Pulver in Sherlock (TV series, 2010–); by Natalie Dormer in Elementary
- Adelia Aguilar is a medieval forensic specialist in a series by Diana Norman (writing as Ariana Franklin) (2006–2010).
- Bilqees "Bobby" Ahmed is a fictional Indian female detective from Hyderabad, as portrayed by Vidya Balan in the 2014 Indian comedy film Bobby Jasoos.
- Flavia Albia spin-off book series of Lindsey Davis' successful series featuring private investigator Marcus Didius Falco. Flavia Albia, his adopted daughter, has grown from a troubled teenager to a feisty widow and who is an investigator in her own right. The series begins in 89AD, shifting the background from the reign of jovial Vespasian to the darker time of his paranoid son Domitian.
- Louisa May Alcott, not yet a famous writer, takes to sleuthing in a series by Jeanne Mackin (writing as 'Anna Maclean') begun in 2004.
- Claire Aldington is an Episcopalian priest and psychologist in New York City in a five-book series by Isabelle Holland (1984–1990).
- Finny Aletter is a stockbroker in two books by Yvonne Montgomery (1987–1990).
- Nikki Alexander is a forensic anthropologist/ pathologist played by Emilia Fox (2004–) in the BBC thriller series Silent Witness by Nigel McCrery (1996–).
- Jaime Allen is a patrolwoman/undercover cop in Dark Blue (2009–10).
- Becky Altringer is a private investigator in California and New Mexico who exposed the Motion Picture Association of America in This Film Is Not Yet Rated, and technical consultant for Stumptown.
- Angela Amalfi is a food critic in a culinary mystery series by Joanne Pence begun in 1993.
- Cherry Ames is a nurse in 27 mysteries (1943–1968), some by Helen Wells and others by Julie Campbell Tatham. The nurse theme was inspired by World War II.
- Anaya is an Asari detective in Nos Astra on the planet Illium in the video game Mass Effect 2.
- Leanne "Pepper" Anderson (played by Angie Dickinson) is a police detective on the NBC Police Woman (1974–1978).
- Angela Anderson (played by Abigail Spencer) is an FBI agent on Lifetime TV series Angela's Eyes (2006).
- Karen Andersen is a London PI who goes undercover to investigate Jihadi brides in a series by Louise Burfitt-Dons starting with The Missing Activist in 2018
- Mici Anhalt is an investigator for the NYC Crime Victims Compensation Board in three novels by Lillian O'Donnell beginning with Aftershock in 1977.
- Anne is the youngest and most likely to be frightened member of the group of kids in Enid Blyton's Famous Five series.
- Callie Anson is an Anglican cleric in novels by US-born and UK-based Kate Charles begun in 2005, after having debuted in a 2002 short story.
- Susanna, Lady Appleton is a 16th-century gentlewoman and herbalist in a series by Kathy Lynn Emerson begun in 1997.
- Katherine Ardleigh is a sleuth in Victorian England in a series by Susan Wittig Albert and Bill Albert (writing as 'Robin Paige') begun in 1994.
- Sarah Armstrong is a criminal profiler and Texas Ranger in a series by Kathryn Casey begun in 2008.
- Jessie Arnold is a champion Alaskan dog sled racer who solves crimes with boyfriend Alex Jensen, a state trooper, in a series by Sue Henry begun in 1991.
- Carol Ashton is an Australian Detective Inspector in a series by Claire McNab begun in 1988.
- Lady Emily Ashton (later Lady Emily Hargreaves) is a Victorian aristocrat in a series by Tasha Alexander begun in 2005.
- Kate "Ash" Ashurst (played by Caroline Catz) is a Detective Inspector on ITV series Murder in Suburbia (2004–05).
- Beth Austen is an Illinois English professor appearing in Mark Twain, George Eliot and Charles Dickens novels by Edith Skom (1989–1998).
- Jane Austen, the novelist, is a sleuth in a series by Stephanie Barron (a.k.a. Francine Mathews), begun in 1996.
- 'Cat' Fortunati Austen is a Sicilian-American Jersey Shore entertainment reporter, a cop's widow and baby sister to six brothers – five cops and one priest – in a series by Jane Rubino begun in 1995.

== B ==
- Molly Morganthau Babbits is an amateur detective who picks up clues in her job as switchboard operator (The Girl at Central, 1915) and subsequently occasionally works as an undercover private eye for a team of lawyers in books by Geraldine Bonner.
- Kate Baeier is a journalist and private investigator in London in a series by Gillian Slovo begun in 1984.
- Renée Ballard is an LAPD detective who works "the late show" out of the Hollywood Station in a series by novelist Michael Connelly. The series includes The Late Show (2017), Dark Sacred Night (2018), and The Night Fire (2019).
- Lily Bard is a cleaning woman and karate expert in Shakespeare, Arkansas, in a series by Charlaine Harris begun in 1996.
- Natalie Barnes is the owner manager of a Bed and Breakfast on an island off the coast of Maine in a cozy series by Karen MacInerney begun in 2006.
- Carolyn Barek portrayed by (Annabella Sciorra) is a New York City detective in the Major Case Squad on the NBC series Law & Order: Criminal Intent, 2005–06.
- Temple Barr is a public-relations consultant and amateur detective in the Midnight Louie series by Carole Nelson Douglas begun in 1992.
- Vicki Barr, flight stewardess, is the heroine in a series of 16 mystery books for girls, published 1947–1964, by Helen Wells and Julie Campbell Tatham.
- Hercule Barton (エルキュール・バートン Erukyūru Bāton?), named after Hercule Poirot, is one of four girl detectives at the Milky Holmes Detective Agency. Her special gift ("Toy") is superhuman strength. They work to combat people who use their gifts for evil in various products by the Tantei Opera Milky Holmes media franchise.
- Friday Barnes.
- Alma Bashears is an attorney called home to Appalachia after her brother is arrested for murder, at the outset of the Appalachian Trilogy (published 1997–2003) by Tess Collins.
- Bast is a graphic artist by day, and an active urban Witch in her private life, who solves murders within the Pagan community in a series of three books by Rosemary Edghill, beginning in 1994.
- Lucille "Lucy" Bates is an Eastern city police officer (later sergeant) played by Betty Thomas on the NBC series Hill Street Blues from 1981 to 1987.
- China Bayles is an herbalist and ex-lawyer in a series by Susan Wittig Albert begun in 1992.
- Madeline Bean is a Hollywood caterer who solves murders in a series by Jerrilyn Farmer begun in 1998.
- Amanda and Lutie Beagle are spinster sisters who inherit a detective agency in two books (1940 and 1941) by Torrey Chansler (writing as Marjorie Torrey) better known as a children's author and illustrator.
- Olivia Beaumann is an amateur sleuth in an Australian culinary series by Goldie Alexander begun in 2002.
- Danielle "Dani" Beck portrayed by (Connie Nielsen) is a New York City detective in the Manhattan Special Victims unit on the NBC series Law & Order: Special Victims Unit, 2006.
- Jo Beckett is a ‘deadshrinker’ or forensic psychiatrist brought in to examine the lives of murder victims to look for reasons for their deaths, in a series of books by Meg Gardiner begun in 2008.
- Kate Beckett portrayed by (Stana Katic) is a New York City homicide detective on the ABC series Castle, 2009–2016.
- Jane Bee is a housemaid in the Royal Household in three books by Douglas Whiteway (writing as C.C. Benison) begun in 1996.
- Trixie Belden is a girl-detective starring in a multi-author series created by Julie Campbell Tatham (debuted 1948; last book 1986).
- Fran Belding is a detective (played by Elizabeth Baur) on Ironside (1971–75).
- Annika Bengtzon is a crime reporter in a series by Swedish writer Liza Marklund begun in 1998.
- Mary Bennet from Jane Austen's Pride and Prejudice acts as a spy for the British government in The Secret Life of Mary Bennet series by Katherine Cowley.
- Olivia Benson portrayed by (Mariska Hargitay) is a New York City police detective & later promoted to Sergeant, Lieutenant & Captain for the Manhattan Special Victims Unit of the NYPD on the NBC series Law & Order: Special Victims Unit 1999–.
- Tuppence Beresford solves crimes with husband Tommy in a series of novels and short-stories by Agatha Christie debuting in 1922. The Secret Adversary, the book which introduced the detectives, became a silent film in 1929, filmed in German and with character names changed – Tuppence became Lucienne Fereoni, played by Eve Gray. Tuppence was subsequently played by Francesca Annis in Agatha Christie's Partners in Crime (1983–1984); by Greta Scacchi in a 2006 episode of Agatha Christie's Marple where the detectives join forces; and by Catherine Frot in French film adaptations 2005 and 2008.
- Fredrika Bergman is a civilian working with a police unit in Sweden in this series by Kristina Ohlsson. Books in the series are: Unwanted, Silenced, The Disappeared and Hostage.
- Siri Bergman is a psychologist with problems of her own in this series by sisters Camilla Grebe and Asa Traff. Set in Sweden, books in the series are: Some Kind of Peace and More Bitter Than Death.
- Myka Ophelia Bering is a Secret Service agent (played by Joanne Kelly) on the Syfy series Warehouse 13 (2009–).
- Jill Bernhardt is a Deputy DA and one of the four women crime solvers in 'The Women's Murder Club' books by James Patterson; played by Laura Harris on the 2007–2008 ABC series Women's Murder Club.
- Mirabelle Bevan is an ex-Secret Service agent turned debt collector who solves mysteries in a series set in 1950s Brighton by Scottish author Sara Sheridan begun in 2012.
- Verity Birdwood is a TV researcher who solves murders in six books by Australian Jennifer Rowe (1987–1995).
- Eleanor Raye "Ellie" Bishop a former analyst for the NSA and who is now a Probationary Agent with NCIS played by Emily Wickersham on NCIS (2013–21)
- Modesty Blaise retires from the underworld and puts her unusual skills to work assisting British Intelligence and others in a comic series (1963–2001), three films (1966, 1982, 2003), and a series of novels and short stories beginning in 1965.
- Anita Blake is a vampire hunter in a fantasy series by Laurell K. Hamilton begun in 1993.
- Clare Blake is the Commander of a detective murder squad (played by Amanda Burton) in the British TV series The Commander on ITV (2003–2008).
- Daphne Blake is an amateur paranormal detective and member of Mystery Incorporated in the Scooby-Doo franchise.
- Eliza Blake is a TV anchor and sleuth is a series by Mary Jane Clark begun in 1998.
- Naomi Blake is a blind ex-policewoman who solves crimes with her policeman husband, Alex, in a British series by Jane Adams begun in 2005.
- Ursula Blanchard is a young widow and lady-in-waiting at the court of Queen Elizabeth I in a book series by Valerie Anand (writing as Fiona Buckley) begun in 1998.
- Torchy Blane is a spunky girl detective, played by Glenda Farrell, in a series of 1930s movies.
- Vicky Bliss is an art historian in a book series by Barbara Mertz beginning in 1973 with Borrower of the Night.
- Molly Blume is an Orthodox Jewish true-crime reporter and author who appears in a series of books by Rochelle Majer Krich (2002–2005).
- Kensi Blye is an NCIS Special Agent (played by Daniela Ruah) on NCIS: Los Angeles (2009–).
- Judy Bolton is a "girl-detective" in a series created by Margaret Sutton in 1932. She has been called a "more complex and believable role model for girls." While never quite as popular as Nancy Drew, the series lasted through 1968 with 38 sequential titles/adventures.
- Stella Bonasera is a crime scene investigator (played by Melina Kanakaredes) on the CBS series CSI: NY (2004–2010).
- Lacy Bond is a detective played by Sondra Currie in the 1974 film Policewomen.
- Theolinda "Dol" Bonner was a private detective in The Hand in the Glove and several Nero Wolfe mysteries created by Rex Stout (debuted in 1937). Her first name is really Theodolinda, from which the Dol comes. See "Nero Wolfe of West Thirty-Fifth Street" by William S. Baring-Gould, Viking 1969.
- Laura Bow is a Tulane University student and daughter of a detective in the 1920s, and the player character in Sierra On-Line's 1989 computer game "The Colonel's Bequest" and its 1992 sequel "The Dagger of Amon Ra."
- Lindsay Boxer is a San Francisco police Inspector in the Women's Murder Club series by James Patterson (debuted 2001). Later portrayed by Angie Harmon on the ABC series Women's Murder Club, 2007–2008.
- Rosemary Boxer is a gardener and amateur sleuth with her business partner Laura Thyme in the UK television series Rosemary and Thyme (2003–2006).
- Joanna Brady is a sheriff in Cochise County, Arizona in a series by J. A. Jance begun in 1993.
- Beatrice Adela Lestrange Bradley is an elderly private detective and polymath psychoanalyst in a series of 65 novels by Gladys Mitchell begun in 1929. Diana Rigg starred in a 1998–1999 BBC television series based on the books.
- Bo Bradley is a bipolar child abuse investigator in San Diego, California in a series by Abigail Padgett (1993–1997).
- Nell Bray is a suffragette in a series by Gillian Linscott begun in 1991.
- Aya Brea is a New York City police detective in the 1998 video game Parasite Eve and its 2000 sequel Parasite Eve II.
- Temperance Daesee Brennan is a forensic anthropologist in a series of novels by Kathy Reichs begun in 1997; Later portrayed by Emily Deschanel on the Fox series Bones, 2005–2017.
- Amy Brewster is an upper class, overweight lawyer and financier who solves crimes for her friends in three books by Sam Merwin Jr. (1945–46).
- Lily Brewster runs a guest house in New York with her brother Robert in a series by Jill Churchill begun in 1999.
- Sydney Bristow portrayed by (Jennifer Garner) is a clandestine CIA officer on the ABC series Alias, 2001–2006.
- Charlotte Brontë, the author, sleuths in a series by Laura Joh Rowland begun in 2008.
- Loveday Brooke is an early "lady detective" created by Catherine Louisa Pirkis (debuted 1894). In the BBC Radio 4 adaptation of the story "The Redhill Sisterhood", she was played by Gayanne Potter and in "The Mystery of Redstone Manor" (an original story by Chris Harrald) on the BBC Radio 4 series The Rivals she was played by Honeysuckle Weeks.
- Verity Browne is a left-wing journalist who sleuths with Lord Edward Corinth in a 10-book cosy series set in the period between WWI and WW2 by David Roberts (2001–2009).
- Anita Burgess is an operative with the Douglass Detective Agency in the novella Sign Of The Dragon by C. M. Eddy, Jr. published by Mystery Magazine in 1919.
- Sarah Burke is a Tucson homicide detective in a police procedural series by Elizabeth Gunn begun in 2008.
- Aiden Burn portrayed by (Vanessa Ferlito) was a New York City police detective and forensic scientist on the CBS series CSI: NY, 2004–05.
- Mary Louise Burrows is a 15-year-old who sets out to prove her grandfather not guilty of treason, in Mary Louise (1916) by L. Frank Baum (author of The Wizard of Oz) under the pseudonym Edith Van Dyne. This was the first in a series of ten stories for adolescents known as The Bluebird Books in which Mary Louise and her friend Josie O'Gormon take on tough challenges.
- Amelia Butterworth is a nosy society spinster who assists Ebenezer Gryce of the New York Metropolitan Police Force in "That Affair Next Door" (1897) and three other novels by detective fiction pioneer Anna Katharine Green.

== C ==
- Chamki Detective is Chamki's alter ego from Galli Galli Sim Sim, India's version of Sesame Street. As Chamki Detective, she loves to find and solve interesting mysteries on the Galli.
- Christine Cagney portrayed by (Sharon Gless) is a New York City police detective later promoted to Detective Sergeant and lieutenant on the CBS series Cagney & Lacey 1982–1988. Reprised for 4 Cagney & Lacey made-for-TV movies in 1994, 1995 & 1996.
- Jenny Cain is the director of a philanthropic foundation in a series by Nancy Pickard begun 1984–1995.
- Charlie Cale portrayed by (Natasha Lyonne) is a drifter traveling the United States while on the run from crime bosses and various other authorities in Poker Face. She possesses the uncanny ability to tell if someone is lying and ends up using it to uncover murders in every location she visits.
- Miranda Callendar is a detective on the BBC One Jekyll 2007.
- Anna Cameron is a Glasgow police sergeant in a series by Scottish Karen Campbell begun 2008.
- Letitia 'Tish' Carberry was embroiled in comic adventures in short stories in the Saturday Evening Post, and from 1911 in books, by Mary Roberts Rinehart.
- Carlotta Carlyle is a 6'1" former Boston city cop turned private detective in a series by Linda Barnes (writer) begun 1987.
- Caroline Carmichael is a CIA intelligence analyst in a series of books by Francine Mathews who held such a job herself for some years.
- Mary Carner is a store detective in five books by Zelda Popkin 1938–1942.
- Sandra Carpenter (Lucille Ball) is an American dancer in London who helps police investigate the death of a friend in film Lured 1947.
- CeCe Caruso is an LA based biographer of crime writers and film makers who becomes involved in mysteries in the course of her work, in a series by Susan Kandel.
- Emily Castles is an amateur sleuth in a British mystery series by Helen Smith.
- Jordan Cavanaugh portrayed by (Jill Hennessy) is a forensic pathologist working for the Boston Medical Examiner in the NBC series Crossing Jordan 2001–2007.
- Lady Grace Cavendish is a 13-year-old girl at Queen Elizabeth I's court, in a series for children by Patricia Finney, but with author credit given to 'Lady Grace'.
- Laura Caxton is a Pennsylvania State Trooper turned vampire hunter in a fantasy series by David Wellington (debuted 2006).
- Lois Cayley is an adventurous young woman in an early mystery novel by Grant Allen (1899).
- Catherine Chandler is a NYPD detective played by Kristin Kreuk in Beauty & the Beast.
- Corinna Chapman runs a bakery in Melbourne and solves neighbourhood puzzles in a series commenced 2004 by Australian Kerry Greenwood.
- Nora Charles is a Nob Hill heiress married to Nick Charles, a retired Pinkerton detective. The pair solves a crime in The Thin Man by Dashiell Hammett and in the successful movie of the book, starring William Powell and Myrna Loy. Five movie sequels to "The Thin Man" were made, followed by radio and television series. Witty banter between husband and wife was a hallmark of the book and films.
- Annabeth Chase is a criminal prosecutor, played by Jennifer Finnigan, in the television series Close to Home, broadcast on CBS 2005–2007.
- Lydia Chin is a private detective in New York City with partner Bill Smith in a series of books by American novelist S. J. Rozan (debuted 1994).
- Denise Cleever is an undercover agent in a series of books by Australian crime novelist Claire McNab (debuted 2000).
- Nancy Clue is an amateur detective and lesbian parody of Nancy Drew in a series of books by American crime novelist Mabel Maney (debuted 1992).
- Phyl Coe was a 'beautiful lady detective' in Philco's Mysteries of the Air, a radio program sponsored by Philco Radio Tubes in 1936. The next season the detective was changed to a man, Phil Coe.
- Nikki Collins is a debutante and detective story enthusiast, played by Deanna Durbin, who sees a murder from a train in the comedic mystery film Lady on a Train (1945).
- Kat Colorado is a private investigator in Sacramento, California in a series of books by American crime novelist Karen Kijewski (debuted 1989).
- Harper Connelly is an investigator in a series of books by American crime novelist Charlaine Harris (debuted 2005).
- Gail Connor is an attorney based in Miami, Florida who works cases with her lover Anthony Quintana. The series was written by Barbara Parker and first appeared in 1994.
- Natalie Cook (Cameron Diaz) is a private detective in the 2000 film Charlie's Angels and sequel Charlie's Angels: Full Throttle 2003.
- Bertha Cool is a private investigator in the Cool and Lam series by American A. A. Fair 1939–1970; Jane Darwell in a lost 1955 TV show based on 1939 debut The Bigger They Come; Benay Venuta in pilot based loosely on Turn On The Heat 1958, perhaps never aired.
- Alexandra Cooper is a Manhattan prosecutor in a series by American Linda Fairstein begun 1996.
- Beka (Rebekah) Cooper is a King's Provost Guard who can talk to spirits, polices the fantasy kingdom Tortall in the Provost's Dog trilogy by Tamora Pierce 2006–2011.
- Iris Cooper is a flapper-era college student in Oregon who solves crimes with journalist Jack Clancy in three books 1984–1989 by K. K. Beck (also writes Jane Da Silva series).
- Miranda Corbie is a private investigator in San Francisco, California in the 1940s in a series by American Kelli Stanley begun 2010.
- Meg Corey is an amateur sleuth whose adventures start after she inherits a colonial house and apple orchard in a series by Sheila Connolly begun 2008.
- Maureen Coughlin is a former Staten Island native who becomes a police officer in New Orleans in a series by Bill Loehfelm begun 2006.
- Miranda "Randy" Craig is an amateur sleuth who solves mysteries related to academe in Edmonton in a series by Janice MacDonald begun 1994.
- Bess Crawford is the daughter of military man and a battlefield nurse in World War I in a series by Charles Todd begun 2009.
- Lady Lara Croft is an English archaeologist explorer who finds missing artifacts and fights danger in Tomb Raider games begun 1996 and Lara Croft: Tomb Raider films begun 2001.
- Alexa Crowe is a New Zealand native with dual NZ/Australian citizenship, who is played by Lucy Lawless in the TVNZ show My Life Is Murder. Alexa is a former detective, now retired, who still consults on very difficult cases of murder. The first season is set in Melbourne, but the pandemic caused subsequent seasons to be moved to Auckland.
- Stella Crown a biker and dairy farmer in Pennsylvania solves mysteries in a series by Judy Clemens.
- Cordelia Cupp portrayed by (Uzo Aduba) is a consulting detective and avid birder who is assigned to investigate a murder at the White House during a state dinner in the Netflix limited series The Residence.
- Florence Cusack is a young lady detective in stories by L. T. Meade and Robert Eustace 1899–1900; played by Elizabeth Conboy in the BBC Radio 4 adaptation of the story "Mr. Bovey's Unexpected Will".

== D ==
- Daisy Dalrymple is a journalist, married to a Detective Chief Inspector of Scotland Yard, in a historical mystery series commenced 1994 by Carola Dunn.
- Jean and Louise Dana, The Dana Girls, are adventurous orphaned sisters living in a boarding school, in a series 1934–1979 by the Stratemeyer Syndicate most famous for creating the Nancy Drew mysteries.
- Kathryn Dance is an agent with the California Bureau of Investigation and an expert in body language, in Monterey, California, in two novels 2006 and 2007 by Jeffery Deaver.
- Jo Danville (portrayed by Sela Ward) is a New York City police detective and former FBI agent on the CBS series CSI: NY 2010–2013.
- Ziva David (portrayed by Cote de Pablo) is a former Israeli Intelligence officer (Mossad) and a current agent of the Naval Criminal Investigative Service on the CBS series NCIS 2005–2013. Reprised for a 4 episode guest arc, 2020.
- Charmian Daniels is a detective in a series of books by English crime novelist Jennie Melville (debuted 1962).
- Eve Dallas is a New York City police lieutenant in the 21st century in the …In Death series of books by American novelist J. D. Robb (debuted 1995).
- Mrs Elizabeth Darcy (née Bennet) from Jane Austen's Pride and Prejudice sleuths with her husband is a series by Carrie A. Bebris debuted 2004 with "Pride and Prescience".
- Elizabeth Darcy is a sleuth in the 2011 novel Death Comes to Pemberley by P. D. James.
- Phoebe Daring is a 16-year-old who sets out to prove her twin brother Phil is innocent of bank fraud in The Daring Twins: A Story for Young Folk (1911) by L. Frank Baum and likewise defends another innocent man in Phoebe Daring (1912).
- Jane Da Silva is an expatriate lounge singer and widow who returns to Seattle after her uncle leaves her money on the condition that she solves hopeless cases, in a book series started 1993 by K. K. Beck who also wrote the Iris Cooper and Jack Clancy series.
- Dorcas Dene is a young lady detective who works with a private investigator to support her mother and husband in two series of short stories by George R. Sims, 1897 and 1898.
- Chloe Decker/Jack Monroe (portrayed by Lauren German) is a Los Angeles Police Detective in the Fox series, Lucifer, 2016–2021.
- Hailey Dean is a prosecutor in the novel The Eleventh Victim by American television commentator Nancy Grace (debuted 2009).
- Kate Delafield is a lesbian LAPD homicide detective in an occasionally romantic eight-book series by Katherine V. Forrest (debuted 1984).
- Evan Delaney is a lawyer turned freelance journalist in a series by Meg Gardiner commenced 2002 with "China Lake".
- Sarah Booth Delaney is a modern, impoverished, southern belle in a series by Carolyn Haines, commenced 1999 with Them Bones.
- Jade del Cameron, an American rancher's daughter who has served as an ambulance driver in WWI, is the protagonist of Suzanne Arruda's historical mystery series set in 1920s Africa.
- Elena Delgado is an FBI agent played by Roselyn Sanchez on the CBS series Without a Trace from 2005 to 2009.
- Candace ‘C.D.’ DeLorenzo (portrayed by Tracey Needham) is a San Francisco Police Inspector in the Lifetime series, The Division, 2001–2003.
- Flavia de Luce is the curious, brilliantly scientific, morbid youngest daughter of motherless three girls in Buckshaw manor, who gets caught up in murders near the 1950s English village of Bishop's Lacey, aged 11 when Alan Bradley began a proposed six-book series with The Sweetness at the Bottom of the Pie in 2009.
- Sister Mary Teresa (Emtee) Dempsey detects in a series by Ralph McInerney, author of the Father Dowling mysteries, writing as 'Monica Quill', begun 1981.
- Bo Dennis (portrayed by Anna Silk), a bisexual succubus that helps fight crime between the light and dark on the Canadian Sci-Fi/Fantasy television series Lost Girl, 2010–2016.
- Velma Dinkley is an amateur paranormal detective and member of Mystery Incorporated in the Scooby-Doo franchise.
- Denver Doll called the "Detective Queen" is a dime novel hero by Edward Lytton Wheeler beginning in 1882 in Beadle's Dime Novels.
- Anna Detroyer a Native American detective based in Miami, Florida, who investigates urban fantasy cases, created by Lela E. Buis.
- Claire De Witt is a pot smoking PI who uses dreams and omens to find the truth in New Orleans, by Sara Gran, the start of a new series begun 2011.
- Eve Diamond is an LA Times reporter in a book series by Denise Hamilton begun 2001.
- Rosa Diaz (portrayed by Stephanie Beatriz) is a bad-ass, openly bisexual New York City police detective in Brooklyn's 99th precinct on the Fox Broadcasting Network comedy show Brooklyn Nine-Nine, 2013–2021.
- Christina Dichiera (real name: Felicity Mathews; usually called "Chris", "Bloodnut" or "Flick") is a young, spunky, and openly bisexual Probationary Constable (later Constable) in the Undercover unit of Victoria Police's Melbourne-based Special Investigations squad; who used to be a street kid/juvenile criminal under her real name before reforming to become a police officer (portrayed by (Jacinta Stapleton) in the Australian crime drama TV series Stingers from season six to season eight, 2002–2004.
- Mary DiNunzio is a Philadelphia area attorney in the all female Rosato law firm headed by her mentor Bennie Rosato.
- Trixie Dixon, girl detective, is the fearless, hot and sassy partner—in banter and in business—of Black Jack Justice, created by Decoder Ring Theatre writer Gregg Taylor. "When it comes to detective work, Jack and Trixie agree on the facts. Clients cry, clients lie, clients dicker over the bill. But if they can cut to the happy ending without cutting each other's throats, it'll be a miracle!"
- Maisie Dobbs takes over a London private investigation agency after her mentor retires, familiar with psychology from his training and her nursing in WWI 1910–1929 for the Maisie Dobbs series by Jacqueline Winspear begun in 2003.
- Brighid Doran is an EMS captain and consultant who becomes a detective when she investigates a fraud involving a ski resort in a fictional Vermont town in Stolen Mountain, the second novel in the Trowbridge Vermont book series by Vermont author IM Aiken.
- Piper Donovan is a wedding caterer is a series by Mary Jane Clark.
- Maggie Doyle is the idealistic, strong-opinioned and brave Victoria Police Constable (later Senior Constable) stationed in Mount Thomas (portrayed by Lisa McCune) in the Australian TV series Blue Heelers, 1994–2000.
- Alex Drake (portrayed by Keeley Hawes) is a police Detective Inspector (DI) and psychologist in the BBC series Ashes to Ashes 2008–2010.
- Frankie Drake (portrayed by Lauren Lee Smith) is the head of a private detective agency in prohibition-era Toronto from the CBC series Frankie Drake Mysteries 2017–.
- Jessie Drake is a divorced homicide detective in a series of novels by Rochelle Majer Krich begun 1993.
- Nancy Drew is one of the best-known "female detectives", starring in a multi-authored series of books created by Edward Stratemeyer in 1930. Portrayed in film by Bonita Granville in Nancy Drew – Detective (1938), Nancy Drew... Reporter (1939), Nancy Drew: Trouble Shooter (1939), and Nancy Drew and the Hidden Staircase (1939); by Pamela Sue Martin and Janet Louise Johnson on the ABC series The Hardy Boys/Nancy Drew Mysteries from 1977 to 1978; by Tracy Ryan in the 1995 syndicated series; by Maggie Lawson in the 2002 television movie Nancy Drew;by Emma Roberts in the 2007 film Nancy Drew and by Kennedy McMann in the CW Television Network series, 2019–2023.
- Margaret "Meg" Duncan is a girl mystery solving series under publisher pseudonym Holly Beth Walker, illustrated by Cliff Shule 1967–1972.
- Sabrina "Bree" Duncan (portrayed by Kate Jackson) is a private detective on the ABC series Charlie's Angels 1976–1979.
- Olivia Dunham (portrayed by Anna Torv) is an FBI agent on the Fox series Fringe (TV series) 2008–2013.
- Constance Dunlap is a reformed thief and detective in a series of short stories by American crime novelist Arthur B. Reeve begun 1913.
- Calleigh Duquesne Emily Procter is a crime scene investigator in the CBS series CSI: Miami 2002–2012.

== E ==
- Alexandra Eames portrayed by (Kathryn Erbe) is a New York City police detective, later promoted to Lieutenant on the NBC/USA series Law & Order: Criminal Intent 2001–2010. She reprised her role for a 2 episode arc on the NBC series, Law & Order: Special Victims Unit, 2014.
- Puck Ekstedt is a literature student from Stockholm in several novels by Dagmar Lange and the TV-series Crimes of Passion (TV series).
- Robin Ellacott is a London-based temp-turned-investigator in the Cormoran Strike series by J.K. Rowling writing as Robert Galbraith.
- Jinny Exstead portrayed by (Nancy McKeon) is a San Francisco Police Inspector on the Lifetime series ‘’The Division’’ 2001–2004.

== F ==
- Doran Fairweather is an antique dealer and amateur detective in a series of books by English novelist Mollie Hardwick (debuted 1986).
- Nola Falacci portrayed by (Alicia Witt) is a New York City police detective in the Major Crimes Bureau on the USA series Law & Order: Criminal Intent, 2007.
- Erica Falck is a biographer who teams up with her police detective husband in this Swedish series by Camilla Lackberg. Books in the series are: The Ice Princess, The Preacher, The Stonecutter, The Gallows Bird, The Hidden Child, The Drowning, The Lost Boy and Buried Angels.
- Kate Fansler is a literature professor and amateur sleuth in a series of books 1964–2002 by Amanda Cross.
- Brodie Farrell is a "finder" of lost objects in a series of books by British crime novelist Jo Bannister (debuted 2001).
- Clare Fergusson is an ex-army helicopter pilot and Episcopalian minister who solves crimes in a series by Julia Spencer-Fleming, commenced 2002.
- Sister Fidelma is a lawyer and religieuse in 7th-century Ireland in a series of books by "Peter Tremayne" (debuted 1994).
- Phryne Fisher is a wealthy aristocratic jazz age detective in a series of books by Australian crime novelist Kerry Greenwood (debuted 1991).
- Josephine Flanagan is an ex-junkie hired to track down a college girl in Hell's Kitchen in the 1950s, in Sara Gran's Dope (2006).
- Flavia Gemina portrayed by (Francesca Isherwood) is a rich girl/amateur sleuth in ancient Rome in the BBC TV series Roman Mysteries, 2007–2008 based on The Roman Mysteries book series debuted 2001 by British author, Caroline Lawrence.
- Flavia Nubia is an African girl, and former slave, in ancient Rome in The Roman Mysteries book series debuted 2001 by Caroline Lawrence and the BBC television series first broadcast 2007.
- Jessica Fletcher portrayed by (Angela Lansbury) is an author and amateur detective on the CBS series Murder, She Wrote, 1984–1996.
- Meredith "Merry" Folger is a Nantucket police officer appearing from 1994 in a series of novels by Francine Mathews.
- Marianne Folkesson is a civil servant whose job it is to take care of the belongings of people who die without any next of kin. She appears in the standalone novel Shadow by author Karin Alvtegen. Set in Sweden.
- Solange Fontaine is a private investigator in short stories by F. Tennyson Jesse (1888–1958), also the author of A Pin to See the Peepshow and Murder and its Motives.
- Maggie Forbes is a police Inspector in London, played by Jill Gascoine in The Gentle Touch, a British TV series 1980–1984, as well as its follow-up C.A.T.S. Eyes, 1985–1987.
- Ellie Foreman is a documentary filmmaker in Chicago in a series debuted 2002 by Libby Fischer Hellmann.
- Malin Fors is a 30-something divorced mother of a teenage daughter, and an ambitious detective inspector, in Linköping, Sweden in a series commenced 2007 by Mons Kallentoft.
- Sarah Fortune is a solicitor and freelance unpaid sex therapist who unravels mysteries that she finds around her in a series commenced 1989 by Frances Fyfield.
- Diana Fowley portrayed by (Mimi Rogers) is an FBI agent on the Fox series The X-Files, 1998–1999.
- Charlie Fox is a personal protection agent and de facto detective in the book series written by British novelist Zoe Sharp.
- Nea Fox is a private investigator in a series of books by British-German crime novelist Amelia Ellis (debuted 2005).
- Dame Frevisse is a Benedictine nun in 15th-century Oxfordshire in a series of books by "Margaret Frazer" (debuted 1992).
- Joe Frye is a female detective first appearing in 2005 and now playing a leading role in P.J. Parrish's Louis Kincaid series.
- Erika Furudo is an amateur detective in the Umineko no Naku Koro ni series of visual novels (debuted 2009).

== G ==
- Kelly Garrett portrayed by Jaclyn Smith is a private detective on the ABC series Charlie’s Angels, 1976–1981 & reprised in the 2003 film Charlie's Angels: Full Throttle.
- Angela Gennaro is a private detective with partner Patrick Kenzie in Boston, MA in a series of books by American novelist Dennis Lehane (debuted 1994).
- Georgina (usually called "George") is a tomboyish, courageous and hot-tempered member of the group of kids in Enid Blyton's Famous Five series.
- Carol Ann Gibson is an attorney in Washington D.C. who becomes involved in investigations in a series of four books by Penny Mickelbury, commenced 1998.
- Stella Gibson portrayed by (Gillian Anderson) is a Detective Superintendent (DS) in the British-Irish crime drama series The Fall.
- Mrs Gladden is the protagonist in Andrew Forrester Jr's The Female Detective (1864).
- Cordelia Glauca (コーデリア・グラウカ Kōderia Gurauka?) is a girl detective who can see and her things others cannot, working with the Milky Holmes Detective Agency to combat evil doers in various products of the Tantei Opera Milky Holmes media franchise.
- Gabriele "Gaby" Glockner (called "Pfote" by her friends) is the only female member of the detective group in the series TKKG. She is animal-loving, smart and the owner of the group's mascot, the cocker spaniel Oskar.
- Gladys 'Gladdy' Gold is an ex-librarian and murder mystery fan, retired to Florida, who takes up sleuthing in a book series by Rita Lakin commenced 2005.
- Rachel Gold is a St. Louis-turned-Chicago defense attorney, series begins 1993.
- Rachel 'Goldie' Goldstein is a tough-as-nails Detective Senior Constable in the NSW Police Force's Sydney Water Police, portrayed by (Catherine McClements) in the Australian TV series Water Rats, 1996–1999.
- Ginny Gordon is a teenaged girl in a series of books 1948–1956 by Julie Campbell Tatham.
- Beverly Gray is the protagonist of the Beverly Gray Mystery Stories by Clair Blank.
- Cordelia Gray is private investigator in the 1972 novel An Unsuitable Job for a Woman and its 1982 sequel The Skull Beneath the Skin, both by English crime novelist P. D. James. Gray was first played by Pippa Guard in the 1982 British film adaptation, and later by Helen Baxendale in the jointly-produced ITV/PBS television adaptation, the first series broadcast 1997 and the second in 1999.
- Hazel Green is a resourceful girl in four books for children 1999–2003, by Odo Hirsch.
- Sophie Greenway is the detective in a culinary mystery series of books by American crime novelist Ellen Hart (debuted 1994).
- Lady Julia Grey is a sleuth in Victorian Britain in historical mysteries by Deanna Raybourn commenced 2007.
- Tammy Gregorio portrayed by (Vanessa Ferlito) is an FBI Special Agent in the CBS series NCIS: New Orleans, 2016–2021.
- Thóra Gudmundsdóttir is an Icelandic lawyer and detective in a series of books by Icelandic crime novelist Yrsa Sigurðardóttir (debuted 2005).

== H ==
- Jane Halifax Rebecca Gibney is a forensic psychiatrist on the Nine Network series Halifax f.p. 1994–2002.
- Grace Hanadarko Holly Hunter is an Oklahoma City police detective in TNT series Saving Grace 2007–2010.
- Emily Hanson is a geologist and amateur investigator in a series of books by American geologist and crime novelist Sarah Andrews begun 1994.
- Sigrid Harald is a police lieutenant in New York City in a series of books by American crime writer Margaret Maron begun 1981.
- Myrtle Hardcastle is a 12-year-old amateur sleuth and aspiring detective in 1890s Victorian England in the series of novels by Elizabeth C. Bunce, first appearing in Premeditated Myrtle in 2020. She solves murder mysteries partnering with her governess Ada Judson and cat Peony.
- Stella Hardesty is a middle-aged woman in rural Missouri who runs a sewing shop and helps women with abusive husbands and boyfriends, having killed her own husband a few years before by Sophie Littlefield begun 2009.
- Benni Harper is a folk art museum curator and amateur detective in San Celina, California in a book series by American writer Earlene Fowler begun 1994.
- Nikki Harper is a realtor in Hollywood who becomes an amateur sleuth to help a friend in trouble, in The Bad Always Die Twice by Cheryl Crane.
- Nyla Harper is a Training Officer-turned-Detective from the series "The Rookie", played by Mekia Cox. Her first appearance is in Season 2 as an undercover agent turning TO for the protagonist John Nolan and later Aaron Thorsen before she gets pregnant and moves up for a "cushy desk job with the detectives" after the birth of her second child.
- Grace Hart Sandra Bullock is an FBI agent in film Miss Congeniality 2000, and sequel Miss Congeniality 2: Armed and Fabulous 2005.
- Ellie Haskell is an amateur detective in a series of books by English crime novelist Dorothy Cannell begun 1984.
- Barbara Havers is a policewoman in a series of books by American crime novelist Elizabeth George begun 1988; played by Sharon Small on the BBC series The Inspector Lynley Mysteries 2001–2007.
- Julie Hayes is a young woman mixed up in dramas on the seedy side of Manhattan, in a series of four books by Dorothy Salisbury Davis 1976–1987.
- Madelyn "Maddie" Hayes (Cybill Shepherd), private investigator, owns Blue Moon Detective Agency with detective David Addison Jr (Bruce Willis) ABC Moonlighting (TV series) 1985–1989.
- Tamara Hayle is an ex-policewoman and private investigator in Newark, N.J. in a series by Valerie Wilson Wesley begun 1994.
- Judy Hill is a policewoman in a series of books by British crime novelist Jill McGown (1947–2007) begun 1983.
- Nikki Hill is a prosecutor in Los Angeles in a series by Christopher Darden and Dick Lochte begun 1999.
- Nikki Heat is a fictional homicide detective in New York City for the series of books inspired by NYPD homicide detective Kate Beckett, partner to fictional murder mystery author Richard Castle, a character on the Castle (TV series), begun 2009.
- Abbess Helewise of Hawkenlye is a 12th-century abbess who solves crimes with the help of knight Josse d'Acquin in a series by Alys Clare begun 1999.
- Dixie Hemingway is an ex-policewoman and pet sitter in Sarasota Florida in a series by Blaize Clement (1932–2011) begun 2005.
- Dido Hoare is an antique bookseller and amateur detective in a series of books by Canadian crime novelist Marianne Macdonald begun 1996.
- Vicky Holden is an Arapaho lawyer in the Wind River Reservation book series by Margaret Coel begun 1995.
- Emma Hollis is an FBI Special Agent played by Klea Scott on the Fox series Millennium 1998–1999.
- Barbara Holloway is an attorney in Eugene, Oregon, in a mystery series by Kate Wilhelm begun 1991.
- Patricia Anne Hollowell is a retired school teacher in Alabama in the 'southern sisters' series by Anne George (died 2001) 1996–2001.
- Charlotte Holmes attributes her detective activities to a mythical brother "Sherlock" in a historical mystery romance series by Sherry Thomas beginning with A Study in Scarlet Women, 2016.
- Enola Holmes is the 14-year-old sister of Sherlock and Mycroft Holmes and has run away from boarding school to make a living as a finder of missing persons in as book series for children grades 6–9 by Nancy Springer begun 2007. She is also the protagonist of the 2020 Netflix film, Enola Holmes
- Shirley Holmes is the great-grandniece of Sherlock Holmes and a 12-year-old amateur sleuth in the Canadian mystery television series The Adventures of Shirley Holmes.
- Laura Holt is the head of the Remington Steele Agency, played by Stephanie Zimbalist in the TV series Remington Steele 1982–1987.
- Elfie Hopkins played by Jaime Winstone is an aspiring teen detective who isn't afraid to fight violence with violence in the 2012 film of the same name.
- Lili Hoshizawa is an energetic 13 year old who uses horoscopes and astrology to solve crimes, and sometimes transforms into 'Detective Spica', in the manga Zodiac P.I. 2001–2003.
- Jeri Howard is a private investigator in Oakland, California in a series by Janet Dawson begun 1990.
- Robin Hudson is a "third-string correspondent" and amateur investigator in a series of books by Canadian journalist and crime novelist Sparkle Hayter 1994–2002.
- Irene Huss is a police detective in novels by Swedish writer Helene Tursten 1998–2007. Books in the series are: Detective Inspector Huss, The Torso, The Glass Devil, Night Rounds, The Golden Calf, The Fire Dance and The Beige Man

== I ==
- Sonya Iverson is a NYC news producer in a series of books by Australian fashion journalist Elsa Klensch begun 2004.
- Bonnie Indermill is a NYC office temp series by Carole Berry begun 1987.
- Dr. Maura Isles is the Commonwealth of Massachusetts' Chief Medical Examiner and a forensic expert working at the Boston Police Department in books by Tess Gerritsen begun The Apprentice 2002; played by Sasha Alexander on TV Rizzoli & Isles 2010–2016.
- Hannah Ives is a Chesapeake Bay area breast-cancer survivor in series by Marcia Talley begun 1999.
- Kate Ivory is an Oxford romance writer in series by Veronica Stallwood begun 1994.

== J ==
- Jill Jackson is a Sydney police officer in a series by Leah Giarratano begun in 2007.
- Gemma James is a Scotland Yard detective in a series by American Deborah Crombie begun 1993.
- Smilla Qaaviqaaq Jaspersen is an isolated woman, who doesn't accept the police conclusion that a neighbour boy's death is accidental and investigates it herself, in Danish author Peter Hoeg's Miss Smilla's Feeling for Snow (1992).
- Mrs Jeffries is a housekeeper to Scotland Yard Inspector Witherspoon in Victorian England who leads the staff to solve his cases in a series by Emily Brightwell begun 1993.
- Jane Jeffry is a Chicago widow with three children who solves murders in a series by Jill Churchill begun 1989.
- Brenda Leigh Johnson portrayed by (Kyra Sedgwick) is a Deputy Chief in the Major Crimes Division of the Los Angeles Police Department on the TNT series The Closer 2005–2012.
- Vivian Johnson portrayed by(Marianne Jean-Baptiste) is an FBI agent on the CBS series Without a Trace, 2002–2009.
- Casey Jones is an unlicensed PI and ex-con, tough and brash, in a series by Katy Munger (co-creator of sexual Tart Noir) begun 1997.
- Jessica Jones portrayed by (Krystten Ritter) in the self-titled Netflix series & the Netflix series/Marvel Comic, The Defenders is a New York City private detective, journalist and former somewhat hesitant superhero & the main protagonist of the Marvel series Alias (2001–04) and The Pulse (2004–06). She has also appeared in The Avengers and other titles.
- Lena Jones is a private investigator and former policewoman in western U.S. in a series by Betty Webb begun 2001.
- Jimm Juree is a Thai crime reporter forced to return to a rural area to look after her mother and the rest of her family, in a series by Colin Cotterill begun 2011.
- Charlotte Justice is an African-American Los Angeles Police Department Detective in a series by African-American Paula L. Woods begun 1999.
- Jennifer Jareau, portrayed by (A.J. Cook) on the CBS & Paramount+ series, Criminal Minds, 2005–2020 rebooted 2022–.

== K ==
- Julia Kalas is a poorly reformed criminal sent to central Texas by Federal Witness Protection in Nine Days and South of Nowhere by Minerva Koenig. The series debuted in 2013.
- Sarah Keate, a nurse by profession, is the only recurring sleuth created by longtime, prolific mystery novelist Mignon G. Eberhart. (Susan Dare, a fictional mystery author who appears in a collection of Eberhart short stories, is generally not considered a "recurring" character.) Keate is featured in Eberhart's first five novels, beginning in 1929, and also appears in some 1930s Hollywood films. In the mid-1930s, Eberhart shifted her focus to standalone mysteries, and she brought back Keate only twice in the remaining 55 years of her career.
- Sarah Kelling is a Beacon Hill, Boston amateur in The Family Vault (Sarah Kelling and Max Bittersohn Mystery #1) by Charlotte MacLeod begun 1979.
- Irene Kelly is a reporter in Goodnight Irene by Jan Burke, begun 1992.
- Kitty Keene is a former chorus girl in Kitty Keene, Inc. a radio show first broadcast 1937 in Chicago. Played successively by: Beverly Younger, Gail Henshaw and Fran Carlon.
- Kylie Kendall lesbian, former Australian bartender, inherits a private LA detective agency in The Wombat Strategy 2004 by Claire McNab, also known for Claire Ashton and Denise Cleever series.
- Maeve Kerrigan is an Irish police detective on the London Metropolitan Police force in a series by Jane Casey. The series debuted in 2010.
- Joanne Kilbourn is a Saskatchewan political advisor, later political science prof and commentator by Gail Bowen begun 1990. Six of the books were made into movies for television, by Shaftesbury Films and CTV.
- Sally Kimball was bodyguard and assistant to Encyclopedia Brown in the children's book series by Donald J. Sobol, which began in 1963.
- Sammy Keyes is the protagonist of the mystery series Sammy Keyes, by Wendelin Van Draanen.
- Samantha Kinsey is young owner of a mystery bookshop, and amateur sleuth, played by Kellie Martin, in Mystery Woman, a US series of made for TV movies debuted 2003.
- Jacqueline Kirby is a librarian, then romance novelist, in four books by Barbara Mertz published 1971, 1974, 1984 and 1989.
- Kyoko Kirigiri is the Ultimate, or Super Highschool Level Detective in the visual novel series Danganronpa, started in 2010 with Danganronpa: Trigger Happy Havoc.
- Jill Kirkendall is a New York City detective played by Andrea Thompson on the ABC series NYPD Blue from 1996 to 2000.
- Abby Knight runs a flower shop in Indiana in a cozy series by Kate Collins, commenced 2004.
- Micky Knight is a New Orleans lesbian private investigator in a series by Jean M. Redmann, commenced 1990 with Death by The Riverside.
- Wendy Knight is a female detective in the Knight & Culverhouse series of books by Adam Croft, commenced 2011 with Too Close For Comfort.
- Deborah Knott is a judge and daughter of a North Carolina bootlegger in a series of books by American crime novelist Margaret Maron (debuted 1992).

== L ==
- Magdalene La Batarde is a whoremistress in 12th century London in books by Roberta Gellis also writer of historical romances.
- Mary Beth Lacey (Tyne Daly) is a New York City police detective on CBS series Cagney & Lacey 1982–1988.
- Raquel Laing is an Inspector with the SFPD Cold Case Unit In Laurie R. King's Back to the Garden (2022). The presence of Al Hawkin provides a link to King's Kate Martinelli series.
- Skip Langdon is a former debutante turned New Orleans police officer in a series by Julie Smith (novelist), begun New Orleans Mourning 1990.
- Meg Langslow is a Yorktown Virginia blacksmith in a comic murder series of books by Donna Andrews (author) begun 1999.
- Charlotte La Rue 59, is a New Orleans house cleaner in a series by Barbara Colley begun 2002.
- Lauren Laurano is a lesbian New York PI in Everything You Have is Mine #1 by Sandra Scoppettone 1991–1999.
- Jane Lawless is a restaurateur and amateur investigator in a series of books by American crime novelist Ellen Hart begun 1989.
- Loretta Lawson is an amateur investigator in a series of books by English journalist and crime novelist Joan Smith begun 1987.
- Katrielle Layton of Layton's Mystery Journey is a private detective who solves various peculiar cases in modern-day London while investigating the disappearance of her adopted father Professor Hershel Layton.
- Laura Lebrel: Main character from the Spanish TV series Los misterios de Laura.
- Aimee Leduc is a French-American private investigator in contemporary Paris in a series by Cara Black begun 1998.
- Anna Lee is a private investigator in a series of books by English crime novelist Liza Cody (debuted 1980); Imogen Stubbs in LWT Anna Lee (TV series) 1993–94.
- Gypsy Rose Lee, the famous stripper, is also an amateur sleuth, in two books 1941 and 1942 by Craig Rice, nom de plume of Georgianna Ann Randolph.
- Judith Lee was a teacher of the deaf who used lip reading skills and jujitsu to help her investigations by Richard Marsh begun 1916.
- Madison Lee (Demi Moore) is a former private detective in the film Charlie's Angels: Full Throttle 2003.
- Adrienne Lesniak is a New York City detective played by Justine Miceli on the ABC series NYPD Blue 1994–1996.
- Catherine LeVendeur is a novice in a convent in 12th Century France who appears in a series of historical mystery novels by Sharan Newman.
- Ingrid Levin-Hill is 13 year-old who is mixed up in mysteries in her home town of Echo Falls, in a book series for children aged 10+ debuted 2006 by Peter Abrahams.
- Janice Licalsi (Amy Brenneman) is a New York City detective on the ABC series NYPD Blue 1993–94.
- Marie Lightfoot is a Florida true-crime author in three books by Nancy Pickard 2000–2002.
- Gemma Lincoln runs a Sydney Australia security firm in a series by Gabrielle Lord begun 1999.
- Sarah Linden see Sarah Lund.
- Ann Lindell is a Swedish police inspector in series by Kjell Eriksson begun 1993.
- Erin Lindsay is a detective in the Chicago Police Department's Intelligence Unit on Chicago P.D. (2014–present)
- Carol Lipton (Diane Keaton) is a middle-aged Manhattan resident who drags her husband Larry and friends into investigating the supposed death of a neighbour in Woody Allen's Manhattan Murder Mystery 1993.
- Teresa Lisbon (Robin Tunney) is a senior agent detective that works for California Bureau of Investigation in TV series The Mentalist 2008–2015.
- Lolita Lobosco is a Bari Police Commissioner, an attractive woman in her forties who runs an all-male police station, investigating murder cases. Created by Gabriella Genisi, the Italian book series was adapted in a TV series, with the title role played by Luisa Ranieri. 2010–2022.
- Dr Eve Lockhart is a forensic pathologist assigned to a cold case squad in the British TV series Waking the Dead, subsequently the lead character in The Body Farm, a spin-off series.
- Kate Lockley was a Los Angeles police detective played by Elisabeth Röhm on the WB television network series Angel from 2000 to 2001.
- Angela Lopez is another TO promoted to Detective in The Rookie (TV series). She is played by Alyssa Diaz. She trains Jackson West (who came up with the other protagonists John Nolan and Lucy Chen) and is promoted to Detective just when she is pregnant with her first child.
- Sarah Lund is a police Detective Inspector, played by Sofie Gråbøl, in a 2007 Danish television series The Killing (Forbrydelsen) in which each episode covers a day in the investigation of a murder. A second Danish series was broadcast in 2009. The series was re-made in English for AMC and broadcast in 2011 with Mireille Enos playing the lead detective, renamed Sarah Linden, with the story transposed to Seattle.
- Josefina "Jo" Lupo is a former US Army Ranger and Eureka town deputy played by Erica Cerra on the 2006–2012 Syfy series Eureka.
- Lucy Lutz is a LAPD detective played by various actors in the WitchCraft Horror Series, She appears in the seventh, ninth, eleventh, fourteenth, fifteenth and sixteenth movies of the series as a supporting character and is the lead in the tenth movie.

== M ==
- Marti MacAllister is an Illinois police detective in a series of books by Eleanor Taylor Bland (debuted 1992).
- Jo Martinez is a NYPD detective in the 2014 ABC television series Forever
- Mitin Masi is a fictional female detective character created by Indian writer Suchitra Bhattacharya
- Charlene Mack is an African-American, lesbian private investigator from Detroit. The Charlie Mack Motown Mystery Series by Cheryl A. Head debuted in 2016.
- Mackenzie is a private detective who becomes part of the "Great Detective Society", in the Touch Detective series of video games, developed by BeeWorks.
- Ellen "Mac" MacKenzie is the smart and witty Detective Sergeant (later Detective Senior Sergeant) and supervisor (later the commanding officer) of Victoria Police's Melbourne-based Undercover unit, portrayed by (Anita Hegh) in the Australian crime drama TV series Stingers, 1998–2002.
- Rory Mackenzie is an attorney who returns to her hometown of Ransom River, California, and finds herself in hostage drama in a thriller by Meg Gardiner, who also writes two series featuring Jo Beckett, and Evan Delaney.
- Catherine Macleod is an investigative reporter in the western United States in a series debuted 2008 by Margaret Coel.
- Rhona MacLeod is a forensic scientist in a series of books by Scottish crime novelist Lin Anderson (debuted 2003).
- Kate McCafferty portrayed by (Bonnie Bedelia) is a San Francisco Police Captain in the Lifetime series The Division. 2001–2004
- D.D. McCall is an L.A. police detective and partner of the title character, played by Stephanie Kramer from 1985 to 1991 on the NBC series Hunter (1984 American TV series).
- Blue McCarron is a reclusive lesbian social psychologist appearing in two novels by Abigail Padgett, who also writes a series featuring Bo Bradley.
- Claire McCarron is a private investigator in New York in the 1987 CBS television series Leg Work.
- Jessica McCay is a detective played by Simone McAullay on the 2008 Nine Network series The Strip.
- Sharon McCone is a California private detective in a series of books by American crime novelist Marcia Muller (debuted 1977).
- Ali McCormick is a detective sergeant, played by Julie Stewart, leading a task force of Canadian homicide detectives investigating unsolved cases in the CTV series Cold Squad (aired 1998–2005).
- Connie McDowell is a New York City detective played by Charlotte Ross on the ABC series NYPD Blue from 1998 to 2004.
- Sally McMillan solved crimes with husband police commissioner 'Stewart McMillan' in the TV series McMillan & Wife which starred Rock Hudson and Susan Saint James and aired 1971–1977.
- Maxine McNab is a widow in her 60s, travelling in her Winnebago with her miniature dachsund, Stretch, in books by Sue Henry.
- Andy McNally is a Police Officer in the 15th Division, played by Missy Peregrym in a Police drama TV series Rookie Blue debuted 2009 airing on NBC Universal Global Networks in Canada.
- Elizabeth McPherson is a detective in a series of books by American crime novelist Sharyn McCrumb (debuted 1984).
- Stoner McTavish is a lesbian travel agent in Boston, Massachusetts in droll humored mystery books with a bit of the macabre, 1985–1997 by Sarah Dreher (1937–2012).
- 'Madame Liu-Tsong is a Chinese art dealer and detective, in The Gallery of Madame Liu-Tsong. The television series ran for one season in 1951 and starred Asian actress Anna May Wong. The show, produced by Dumont, is perhaps the first TV detective show featuring a woman, and it certainly was the first American TV show to star an Asian American in the leading role. Sadly, all copies of the show were destroyed.
- Maddie Magellan is a pushy and impatient reporter and crime writer who starts investigations which magician Jonathan Creek resolves, in the BBC series Jonathan Creek 1997–2009. Maddie is played by Caroline Quentin.
- Gianna Maglione is a lesbian police detective in charge of a Washington D.C. hate crimes unit in a series by Penny Mickelbury commenced 1994.
- Katie Maguire is an Irish police detective who gains a reputation for catching Cork's killers, often at great personal cost in a series by Graham Masterton commenced 2003.
- Lady Harriet Makepeace is policewoman in an elite unit of London's Metropolitan Police, working with a male partner from a very different background in the NYPD, in the British television series Dempsey and Makepeace, aired 1984–86, and played by Glynis Barber.
- Casey Maldonado and her companion the Grim Reaper investigate murders in a series by Judy Clemens.
- Kathleen Mallory is a police sergeant with a dark past in New York City in a series of books by novelist Carol O'Connell (debuted 1994).
- Munch Mancini is an auto mechanic and amateur sleuth with a dark past in Los Angeles, California in a series of books published 1995–2005 by deceased novelist Barbara Seranella (1956–2007).
- Jane Marple is an elderly amateur investigator in a dozen books by English crime novelist Agatha Christie (debuted 1930). Played by Margaret Rutherford in Murder, She Said (1961), Murder at the Gallop (1963), Murder Most Foul (1964), and Murder Ahoy! (1964); by Angela Lansbury in The Mirror Crack'd (1980); by Ita Ever in A Pocket Full of Rye (1983); and by Helen Hayes in A Caribbean Mystery (1983) and Murder with Mirrors (1984). Played by Joan Hickson on the 1984–1992 BBC One series Miss Marple.
- Veronica Mars is a teenage amateur detective played by Kristen Bell on the 2004–2007 UPN/CW series Veronica Mars.
- Cat Marsala is a freelance investigative reporter in Chicago in a series by Barbara D'Amato commenced 1990.
- Lizzy Martin is a doctor's daughter in Victorian England who becomes a lady's companion after her father dies with large debts. She investigates crimes with the help of policeman Ben Ross, in a series commenced 2006 by Ann Granger.
- Rina Martin is a former actress, who played a PI on television, in a series by Jane Adams, debuted 2007.
- Saz Martin is a private investigator who starts her business with government funding for the unemployed, in a series started 1994 by Stella Duffy.
- Kate Martinelli is a police officer in San Francisco, California in a series of books by American crime novelist Laurie R King (debuted 1993).
- Jo Martinez is a NYPD homicide detective on the 2014–2015 US TV show Forever.
- Rebecka Martinsson is a lawyer in Sweden in this series of psychological thrillers by Asa Larsson. Books in the series are: Sun Storm (also published as The Savage Altar), The Blood Spilt, The Black Path, Until Thy Wrath Be Past and The Second Deadly Sin.
- Sister Mary Helen is an elderly crime solving nun in San Francisco, debuted 1984 in a series by Sister Carol Anne O'Marie (1933–2009), a nun in the order of St Joseph of Carondelet.
- Daphne Matthews is a forensic psychologist in a Ridley Pearson#Lou Boldt Series by American suspense novelist Ridley Pearson (debuted 1988).
- Cassie Mayweather is a homicide detective played by Sandra Bullock in 2002 film Murder by Numbers.
- Patricia "Paddy" Meehan is Glaswegian journalist and investigator in a series of books by Scottish crime novelist Denise Mina (debuted 2005).
- Carlotta Milburn is a Long Island socialite who, with her husband Tony, must solve a mystery which happened the night before in a wild party, in a mystery comedy film of 1935, Remember Last Night? featuring Constance Cummings.
- Kinsey Millhone is a private investigator and former policewoman Santa Teresa, California in the "alphabet mystery" series of books by American crime novelist Sue Grafton (debuted 1982).
- Tomoe Minai is a detective inspector in the series Higurashi When They Cry.
- Perveen Mistry is a Parsi lawyer and detective in British India in the book series by Sujata Massey
- Mirette is a 10-year-old girl who travels the world and takes part in investigations in the Mirette Investigates book and animated television series.
- Anna Mironova (Aleksandra Nikiforova) is a young Russian spiritualist sought by locals and the recently deceased to solve crimes, leading her to cross paths with the town's police inspectors, in the late 19th century period television series Detective Anna 2016–2017.
- Tess Monaghan is a private investigator and former journalist in Baltimore in a series of books by American journalist and crime novelist Laura Lippman (debuted 1997).
- Lindsay Monroe is a New York City detective and crime scene investigator played by Anna Belknap in the CBS series CSI: NY 2005–2013.
- Victoria Moretti is deputy sheriff to Walt Longmire, Wyoming sheriff, in a book series commenced 2004 by Craig Johnson, and in the TV series played by Katee Sackhoff.
- Debra Morgan is a police detective in the Dexter series of books by American crime novelist "Jeff Lindsay" (debuted 2004); played by Jennifer Carpenter on the 2006–2013 Showtime series Dexter.
- Alex Morrow is Glaswegian detective in a series of books by Scottish crime novelist Denise Mina (debuted 2009).
- Margaret Moss is an actress turned private detective in this Swedish series by Kjersti Scheen. The only book translated to English so far is Final Curtain.
- Nora Mulcahaney is a NYC police detective appearing in 17 books by Lillian O'Donnell, beginning in 1972.
- Kate Mulcay is a reporter in Atlanta, Georgia in books by reporter Celestine Sibley. Kate first appeared in 1958 in The Malignant Heart, as Katy Kincaid, along with her future husband, policeman Lieutenant Mulcay. Her character returned to solve mysteries in five books published 1991–1997.
- Alex Munday is a private detective played by Lucy Liu in the 2000 film Charlie's Angels and 2003 sequel Charlie's Angels: Full Throttle.
- Jill Munroe is a private detective played by Farrah Fawcett on the ABC series Charlie's Angels 1976–1977.
- Kris Munroe is a private detective played by Cheryl Ladd on the ABC series Charlie's Angels 1977–1981.
- Laura Murphy is a New York City detective played by Bonnie Somerville on the ABC series NYPD Blue 2004–2005.
- Molly Murphy is a private detective in 19th century New York City in a series of books by English crime novelist "Rhys Bowen" (debuted in 2001).
- Ruby Murphy is a museum worker and accidental investigator in a series of books by American poet and crime novelist Maggie Estep (debuted in 2003).

== N ==
- Grace Nakimura is an assistant and eventually investigator for titular protagonist Gabriel Knight in adventure game series created by Jane Jensen from 1993.
- Victoria "Vicki" Nelson is a medically retired police officer turned private investigator in Tanya Huff's Blood Ties series 2007–08.
- Elizabeth "Lizzie" Newton is the title character of the Korean manhwa Lizzie Newton: Victorian Mysteries. In the 1864 London universe of Sherlock Holmes, she is a mystery writer under the male pseudonym of Logica Docens. She solves actual mysteries aided by Edwin White, her steward, fiancé and former barrister.
- Thursday Next is a Literatec, literary detective in an alternate England by Jasper Fforde in series begun 2001.
- Saga Norén
- Pam North is wife of publisher Jerry and solves murders with him, in: newspaper vignettes and short stories written in the 1930s; a Broadway play and a film in the early 1940s; novels 1940–1963; and TV dramas 1946 and 1952–1954. Richard Lockridge created newspaper pieces and short stories, and co-wrote novels with wife Frances. The Mr. and Mrs. North series had solvable puzzles, a humorous domestic environment, New York locale, and socio-political commentary.

== O ==
- Brandy O'Bannon is a reporter in a series set in Florida by Ann Turner Cook, commenced 2001.
- Siobhan O'Brien is a private detective in a series set in Upstate New York by Sung J. Woo, commenced 2020.
- Kate O'Donnell is a photographer working in 1960s London in a series of books by Patricia Hall, the first appearing in 2011.
- Maureen O’Donnell is an engaging survivor in three books set in Glasgow by Denise Mina.
- Shay O'Hanlon is a coffee shop owner drawn into various capers in a series set in Minnesota by Jessie Chandler, commencing in 2011.
- Zoya Okoro is an inspector in the BBC One soap opera Doctors.
- Juliet O'Hara is a police detective in Santa Barbara, California played by Maggie Lawson on the 2006–2014 USA series Psych.
- Ariadne Oliver is a detective novelist who attempts to assist and guide Hercule Poirot in some of Agatha Christie's novels, but who usually gets things thoroughly wrong. A lot of her books are parodies of Agatha's own work.
- Christie Opara is a police detective in New York City in a trilogy of books by American crime novelist and former police detective Dorothy Uhnak (debuted 1968; last book 1970).
- Rita Ortiz is a New York City detective played by Jacqueline Obradors on the ABC series NYPD Blue from 2001 to 2005.

== P ==
- Mrs. Pargeter is a widow with a shadowy past who solves uncanny mysteries in a series of books by English crime novelist Simon Brett begun 1986. Pargeter is the real surname of Cadfael creator Ellis Peters.
- Dex Parios is a private investigator working in Portland, Oregon, from Greg Rucka's comic book Stumptown.
- Audrey Parker is an FBI agent played by Emily Rose on Syfy Haven (TV series) 2010–2015.
- Penny Parker is a high school detective in a series by Mildred A. Wirt Benson (also authored some Nancy Drew) 1939–1947.
- Amelia Peabody is a Victorian spinster in 1884 whose interest in Egyptology leads to marry Emerson and live among pyramids, solving crimes in the Amelia Peabody series by American Elizabeth Peters begun 1975.
- Delia Peabody is a NYC cop under Eve Dallas in the futuristic ...in Death series by American J. D. Robb begun 1995.
- Emma Peel* (Diana Rigg) is Steed's detective assistant on the British Series: The Avengers 1967–1968.
- Sister Pelagia is an Orthodox nun and teacher in 1890s provincial Russia girls' school in three novels by Boris Akunin.
- Professor Karen Pelletier is an amateur sleuth in a college setting in a series by Joanne Dobson begun 1997.
- Lucinda Pierce is a homicide detective in Virginia in a book series of the same name by true-crime writer Diane Fanning begun 2008.
- Anna Pigeon is a park ranger in a series of books by American Nevada Barr begun 1993.
- Melinda Pink is a magistrate and climber in a series of books by British climber and crime novelist Gwen Moffat begun 1973.
- Angie Piper is a kind yet fiesty and effective Constable (later Detective Senior Constable) in Victoria Police's Melbourne-based Undercover unit (later part of the Special Investigations squad), who was also temporarily transferred to the Homicide unit for a brief stint, portrayed by (Kate Kendall) in the Australian crime drama TV series Stingers, 1998–2004.
- Stephanie Plum is a New Jersey bounty hunter in a comic mystery series by American Janet Evanovich begun 1994; acted by Katherine Heigl in comedy murder mystery One for the Money (film) 2012.
- Emily Pollifax is an elderly widow who volunteers for the CIA and has to solve mysteries to get out of trouble in series by Dorothy Gilman begun 1966. Played by Rosalind Russell in Mrs Pollifax - Spy 1971; by Angela Lansbury in The Unexpected Mrs Pollifax 1999.
- Eugenia Potter in recipe-based three books by Nancy Pickard 1992–2001.
- Beatrix Potter, the children's author, is a solver of mysteries in a series by Susan Wittig Albert.
- Eleanor 'Nell' Pratt is an amateur sleuth in a cozy series set in the world of museums by Sheila Connolly begun 2010.
- Amy Prentiss was a young female Chief of Detectives in the San Francisco Police Department, in a short-lived TV series of the same name, screened 1974–75 as part of NBC Mystery Movie.
- Emily Prentiss dark haired and down to earth profiler in Criminal Minds
- Josie Prescott is an antiques appraiser in a series by Jane Cleland begun 2000.
- Sandra Pullman, played by Amanda Redman, is a Detective Superintendent in charge of UCOS (Unsolved Crime and Open Case Squad) in BBC New Tricks begun 2005.
- Lucy Pym is a popular psychologist who puzzles out a crime in a physical training college for girls in Lucy Pym Disposes 1946 by Josephine Tey, more famous for her series on Scotland Yard Inspector Alan Grant.

== Q ==
- Faye Quick is a 1943 Manhattan secretary who takes over a detective agency when her boss is drafted, in This Dame for Hire by Sandra Scoppettone, published 2005.
- Sarah and Meg Quilliam are sisters, owner and chef of an Inn in Hemlock Falls in a cozy series by Claudia Bishop begun 1993.
- Nina Quinn is a landscaper in a series by Heather Webber that begun in 2004.
- Imogen Quy is a nurse at St Agatha's College, Oxford in a series by Jill Paton Walsh.

== R ==
- Agatha Raisin is an impatient and nosy retired London PR agent who starts her own detective agency in Carsley, Cotswald, an English village. The book series begun 1992 by English author MC Beaton (Marion Chesney), also the author of Hamish Macbeth series. Agatha is played by Penelope Keith in some BBC radio adaptations and Ashley Jensen in the television adaptation for Sky1.
- Gwen Ramadge is a private investigator in books by Lillian O'Donnell.
- Magdalena ‘Magda’ Ramirez portrayed by (Lisa Vidal) is a San Francisco Police Inspector in the Lifetime series The Division, 2001–2004.
- Precious Ramotswe is a Batswana private detective in The No. 1 Ladies' Detective Agency series by Alexander McCall Smith begun 1998; Jill Scott BBC One series The No. 1 Ladies' Detective Agency 2008–2009.
- Sonie "Sunny" Randall is a private investigator in a series of books by American crime novelist Robert B. Parker begun 1999.
- Sheila Ray is a private investigator in a series of novels and stories by Indian English novelist Ashok K. Banker begun 1992 and credited as the first Indian PI in fiction.
- Angela Reide portrayed by (Lela Rochon) is a San Francisco Police Inspector in season one of the Lifetime series, The Division, 2001.
- Judy Reeves was an amateur detective belonging to a previous incarnation of Mystery Incorporated, in Scooby-Doo! Mystery Incorporated.
- Monica Reyes is an FBI agent played by Annabeth Gish on the Fox series The X-Files, 2001–2002.
- Ali Reynolds goes home to Arizona after her job and husband are taken by younger women, and finds trouble in a book series by J. A. Jance begun 2006.
- Louise Rick is Detective Inspector in Copenhagen in a series by Sara Blædel begun 2005.
- Jane Rizzoli portrayed by (Angie Harmon) is a Boston Police Detective in the TNT series, Rizzoli & Isles; 2010–2016 and in a series of books from American novelist Tess Gerritsen originally written in the 2001 book, The Surgeon.
- Molly Robertson-Kirk was the head of the "Female Department" of Scotland Yard in a series of short stories by British novelist Emma Orczy (debuted 1910).
- Anne Rodway is a poor needlewoman who investigates the death of her friend from a blow to the head, in a story in diary form by Wilkie Collins first published in Dickens' Household Words in 1856.
- Amanda Rollins is a detective from Law & Order: Special Victims Unit who transferred from Atlanta to SVU. She has been on the show since the 13th season's premiere in 2011.
- Eleanor Roosevelt, the real First Lady, is an amateur sleuth in a string of books starting in 1984 by Eleanor Roosevelt's son Elliott Roosevelt.
- Bennie Rosato is an attorney in an all-female law firm in Lisa Scottoline's series of legal thrillers set in Philadelphia. Benny is the lead character in the first book Legal Tender, and in Think Twice and Dead Ringer; other lawyers in the firm lead in the other books, including Mary DiNunzio and Judy Carrier.
- Lillian Rose is an aspiring actress and mannequin at Sinclair's department store in 1909 London where she and her group of friends solve various mysteries in a series of books by Katherine Woodfine.
- Ruby Rothman is a rabbi's widow in Eternal, Texas, who solves crimes in a series by Sharon Kahn, begun 1998.
- Lilly Rush is a cold case detective in Philadelphia; Kathryn Morris on CBS series Cold Case 2003–2010.
- Diane Russell (Kim Delaney) is a New York City detective in ABC series NYPD Blue 1995–2003.
- Mary Russell is an amateur detective and wife of Sherlock Holmes in a series of books by American crime novelist Laurie R. King, begun 1994.
- Maggie Ryan first appears as a student in P.M. Carlson's Audition for Murder, first in an eight-book series placed in the 1960s and 1970s. 1985–1991.
- Samantha (Sam) Ryan is a forensic pathologist in the BBC TV series Silent Witness, which began in 1996.

== S ==
- Lisbeth Salander is a computer hacker and private investigator in the Millennium Trilogy by Swedish journalist and novelist Stieg Larsson begun 2005; (Noomi Rapace) in The Girl with the Dragon Tattoo, The Girl Who Played with Fire, and The Girl Who Kicked the Hornets' Nest.
- Dylan Sanders portrayed by (Drew Barrymore) is a private detective in the feature films; Charlie's Angels, 2000 and sequel Charlie's Angels: Full Throttle, 2003.
- Amy Santiago portrayed by (Melissa Fumero) is an obsessively meticulous detective and later sergeant of Brooklyn's 99th precinct in Brooklyn Nine-Nine.
- Eliza Scarlet (Kate Phillips) works in the TV series as detective in Victorian London with William Wellington a.k.a. 'The Duke'
- Kay Scarpetta is the Chief Medical Examiner for Virginia in a series of books by American crime novelist Patricia Cornwell begun 1990.
- Goldy Schulz is a caterer and amateur detective in Colorado in a series of books by American Diane Mott Davidson begun 1992.
- Abby Sciuto (Pauley Perrette) is a forensic specialist working for the Naval Criminal Investigation Service in the CBS series NCIS, first broadcast 2003.
- Ann Scotland (Arlene Francis) was a private investigator in The Affairs of Ann Scotland, a radio show produced in Hollywood October 1946 – Jan 1947.
- Emma "Scribbs" Scribbins (Lisa Faulkner) is a detective sergeant ITV series Murder in Suburbia 2004–2005.
- Dana Katherine Scully (Gillian Anderson) is an FBI agent on Fox series The X-Files 1993-2002/2016-2018, and The X-Files: I Want to Believe film 2008.
- Emily D. Seeton, a.k.a. Miss Seeton or MissEss, is a retired art teacher who provides insights to the police in a humorous British cosy series begun 1968 by Heron Carvic and continued by two other authors.
- Mary Shannon (Mary McCormack) is a United States Marshal in Albuquerque, New Mexico on the USA series In Plain Sight 2008-now.
- Wollie Shelley is a small business owner and greeting card designer mixed up in FBI and other cases for a 'Dating' themed series by Harley Jane Kozak, begun 2004.
- Sherlock "Sheryl" Shellingford (シャーロック・シェリンフォード Shārokku Sherinfōdo) is a detective with the gift of telekinesis in the Milky Holmes Detective Agency – staffed by four girls – in the Tantei Opera Milky Holmes media franchise.
- Jun Shibata is a quirky and gifted police detective, played by Miki Nakatani, who deals with unsolved cases in the TV drama and film Keizoku.
- Rei Shimura is an antiques expert and amateur detective in a series of books by English-American novelist Sujata Massey (debuted 1997).
- Naoto Shirogane is a young detective in the 2008 role-playing video game Persona 4
- Jemima Shore is an investigative reporter and amateur detective in a series of books by Irish novelist Antonia Fraser begun 1977; Maria Aitken in ITV miniseries Quiet as a Nun 1978, and Patricia Hodge on ITV series Jemima Shore Investigates 1983.
- Kate Shugak is a former District Attorney in Anchorage, Alaska in a series of books by American Dana Stabenow begun 1992.
- Jo Beth Sidden is a trainer of bloodhounds in a series set in southern USA by Virginia Lanier (1930–2003) 1995–2003.
- Sara Sidle is a crime scene investigator played by Jorja Fox on the 2000–2015 CBS series CSI: Crime Scene Investigation.
- Maud Silver is a retired governess turned amateur detective in a series of books by British crime novelist Patricia Wentworth (debuted 1928).
- Georgia Skeehan is a fire marshall in a series by Suzanne Chazin, commenced 2001.
- Ema Skye is a detective in the 2007 visual novel video game Apollo Justice: Ace Attorney.
- Ruby Skye is the teenage namesake of Ruby Skye P.I.
- Ernesta Snoop and Gwendolyn Snoop Nicholson were two elderly sisters, played by Helen Hayes and Mildred Natwick, who solved mysteries in The Snoop Sisters, a five episode TV series aired 1972–1974 as part of the NBC Mystery Movie.
- Anna Southwood is a detective in a series of books by Australian crime novelist Jean Bedford (debuted 1990).
- Samantha Spade is an FBI agent played by Poppy Montgomery on the 2002–2009 CBS series Without a Trace.
- Diana Spaulding is a late 19th-century journalist in a book series debuted 2004 by Kathy Lynn Emerson.
- Isabel Spellman is a member of a family who run a private investigation agency in San Francisco in novels by Lisa Lutz (debuted 2007).
- Sookie Stackhouse is a telepath with a vampire boyfriend in The Southern Vampire Mysteries by American mystery novelist Charlaine Harris; played by Anna Paquin on the 2008–present HBO series True Blood.
- Vera Stanhope is a police Detective Chief Inspector in a book series commenced 1999 by Ann Cleeves and in the ITV series Vera adapted from the books, first broadcast May 2011.
- Clarice Starling is an FBI agent in the 1988 novel The Silence of the Lambs and its 1999 sequel Hannibal, both by Thomas Harris; played by Jodie Foster in the 1991 film The Silence of the Lambs, and by Julianne Moore in the 2001 sequel Hannibal.
- Serena Stevens is a New York City detective played by Saffron Burrows on the USA series Law & Order: Criminal Intent 2010–present.
- Roberta Steel is a detective inspector in a series of books by Scottish crime novelist Stuart MacBride begun 2005.
- Michaela Stone is a New York City detective in Manifest.
- Rosika Storey is a flapper era private investigator in a series of magazine articles published 1922 to 1935 by Canadian writer Hulbert Footner.
- Violet Strange is a debutante and amateur detective in a series of stories by American poet and novelist Anna Katharine Green begun 1878; Teresa Gallagher in BBC Radio 4 adaptation of "The Golden Slipper".
- Mary Sullivan (Betty Garde) was an NYPD officer in Policewoman, an ABC radio drama 1946–47.
- Lady Rose Summer is an independent-minded Edwardian debutante from a wealthy family in a series by Marion Chesney begun 2003.
- Anita Sundstrom is a Swedish police detective in this series by Torquil MacLeod. Books in the series are: Meet Me in Malmo, Murder in Malmo, Missing in Malmo and Midnight in Malmo.
- Cassie Swann is an expert bridge player and amateur detective in a series of books by "Susan Moody" begun 1993.
- Nell Sweeney is a governess in Boston after the Civil War, in a series by P B Ryan begun 2003.
- Hannah Swensen is the owner of The Cookie Jar with "slay-dar", radar for murder, in Lake Eden, Minnesota for the Joanne Fluke murder-romance-recipe mysteries begun 2003.
- Casey Shraeger is a New York City police played by Amber Tamblyn on the ABC series The Unusuals 2009.

== T ==
- Laetitia Talbot is an archeologist in 1920s Europe in a book series by Barbara Cleverly.
- Sophie Taylor-Cavendish is a shopgirl who works in fictional department store Sinclair's in 1909 London, where with the help with her friends she solves various mysteries in the book series by Katherine Woodfine.
- Caitlin Todd is a Naval Criminal Investigative Service agent played by Sasha Alexander on the CBS series NCIS from 2003 to 2005.
- Aurora Teagarden is a small town librarian and mystery novel fan in the first mystery series by Charlaine Harris, debuted 1990.
- Alison Temple ('Alison Wonderland') is a private detective who joins an all-female detective agency in London in two books by British novelist Helen Smith.
- Jane Tennison is a Detective Chief Inspector at Scotland Yard played by Helen Mirren in the ITV Prime Suspect series, aired between 1991 and 2006. In the 2011 American television remake (broadcast on NBC), she is a New York City police detective played by Maria Bello.
- Sue Thomas is a deaf FBI agent played by Deanne Bray on the 2002–2005 CTV/PAX series Sue Thomas: F.B.Eye.
- Laura Thyme played by Pam Ferris, is Rosemary Boxer's (Felicity Kendal) partner in their landscaping business and their many investigations in the TV show Rosemary & Thyme. The daughter of a farmer and a home gardener; she was a Woman Police Constable (WPC) in North Kensington and a member of "The CADS" (The Coppers' Amateur Dramatic Society) until she had children (Matthew, a policeman and Helena, a sculptor). After twenty-seven years of marriage, her policeman husband abandoned her for a younger woman he met at work.
- Aud Torvingen is a Norwegian ex-cop who lives in the US. This three book (so far) series by Nicola Griffith began in 1998
- Kay Tracey is a Nancy Drew—like 16-year-old girl detective in a series published 1934–1942 under the name Frances K Judd, a house pseudonym of the Stratemeyer Syndicate. The books were revised and re-issued several times after initial publication, most recently in the 1980s.
- Melanie Travis is a school teacher and amateur dog-show detective in a series of books by American crime novelist Laurien Berenson (debuted 1995).
- Anna Travis is a Detective Inspector in a series of books 2004–2009 by English writer Lynda La Plante adapted for television as Above Suspicion which screened from 2009 with Kelly Reilly playing Travis.
- Michael Tree ('Ms. Tree') takes on her husband's investigation business after he is murdered, in a comic book series 1981–1993 by Max Allan Collins and in his 2007 novel, Deadly Beloved.
- Elizabeth Tucker is a baker in contemporary Salem, Massachusetts, in the paranormal-themed "Unmentionables" cosy series begun 2010 by Janet Evanovich.
- Frances "Frankie" Tully is a detective played by Vanessa Gray on the 2008 Nine Network series The Strip.

== V ==
- Claudia Valentine is a Sydney PI in a series by Australian Marele Day begun 1988.
- Mary Vance (Joan Blondell) inherits her uncle's detective agency and works with a police detective (Dick Powell). in Miss Pinkerton, Inc. a radio program from 1941.
- Harriet Vane, later Lady Peter Wimsey, is first a suspect then wife of Lord Peter Wimsey in short stories and four books by Dorothy Sayers 1998–2010 (by Jill Paton Walsh based on an uncompleted manuscript by Sayers); played by Constance Cummings in Busman's Honeymoon 1941 (Haunted Honeymoon in U.S.) and by Harriet Walter in BBC adaptations begun 1997.
- Tessa Vance is a young female homicide detective in two books by Australian Jennifer Rowe; played by Lucy Bell in Australian TV series Murder Call 1997–2000.
- Emma Victor is a lesbian San Francisco PI in series by Mary Wings, begun 1986.
- Johanna Vik is a former FBI profiler returned home to Norway, working with Adam Stubo in a series by Norwegian Anne Holt begun 2006.

== W ==
- Hilda Wade is a nurse who solves crimes with a medical theme in stories by Grant Allen (early 20th century).
- Hetty Wainthropp is a retiree and amateur investigator played by Patricia Routledge on the 1996–1998 BBC One series Hetty Wainthropp Investigates.
- Renee Walker is an FBI agent played by Annie Wersching on the Fox series 24 from 2009 to 2010.
- Linda Wallander, daughter of Henning Mankell's Kurt Wallander, just beginning her own police career, has center stage in Before the Frost (2004), translated from Swedish Innan frosten (2002). Also taking part are Kurt Wallander himself and Stefan Lindman (from Mankell's The Return of the Dancing Master).
- Rachel Walling is an FBI agent in five books – The Poet, The Narrows, Echo Park, The Overlook, and The Scarecrow – by American crime novelist Michael Connelly (debuted 1996).
- Penny Wanawake is a model and amateur investigator in a series of books by British crime novelist "Susan Moody" (debuted 1984).
- D D Warren is a police detective in Boston is a series debuted 2005 by Lisa Gardner.
- Victoria Iphigenia "Vic" Warshawski is a private investigator in Chicago in a series of books by American crime novelist Sara Paretsky; played by Kathleen Turner in the 1991 film V.I.Warshawski.
- Stella Warwick is a young widow who travels to New Guinea to learn more about her husband's death, in the 1952 Edgar Award winning novel Beat Not the Bones by Charlotte Jay.
- Raina Washington (Taraji P. Henson) is a San Francisco Police Inspector in the Lifetime series, The Division, 2002–2004.
- Amelia Watson is the second wife of Dr. Watson, and an amateur sleuth, in two novels and many short stories by Michael Mallory (debuted 1995).
- Joan Watson, a former surgeon turned sober companion appointed to monitor the recovery of former heroin addict Sherlock Holmes and assist him in solving cases in New York City. Played by Lucy Liu in the 2012 CBS series Elementary.
- Bailey Weggins is a true crime writer for magazines in a book series debuted 2004, by magazine editor Kate White.
- Laurène Weiss (Suliane Brahim) is the police chief investigating a spree of mysterious murders and disappearances in the remote wilderness surrounding the fictional French town of Villefranche, from the television series Black Spot (Zone Blanche) 2017–.
- Daisy Wellsis an English boarding school girl during the 1930s in a book series by Robin Stevens is the president of the Wells and Wong detective society she established with her friend Hazel Wong.
- Maria Wern is a police detective in Sweden in this series by Anna Jansson. Books translated to English are: Killer's Island and Strange Bird.
- Helen West is a driven prosecutor with a keen sense of justice in a book series 1988–1996 by Frances Fyfield, twice adapted for television, with Helen played firstly by Juliet Stevenson and then by Amanda Burton.
- Honey West is a private detective in a series of eleven books by "G. G. Fickling" (debuted 1957); played by Anne Francis on the 1965–1966 ABC series Honey West.
- Megan Wheeler is a New York City detective played by Julianne Nicholson on the NBC/USA series Law & Order: Criminal Intent from 2006 to 2009.
- Blanche White is a domestic worker who investigates mysteries in a series commenced 1992 by Barbara Neely.
- Lace White is a sleuth created by Jeannette Covert Nolan, appearing in a handful of mysteries from the 1930s to the 1950s. White is an unusual character, a low-key retired schoolmarm who is also a special criminal investigator with credentials issued by the governor of Indiana.
- Jane Whitefield is a detective in a series of books by American mystery novelist Thomas Perry (debuted 1995).
- Eve Whitfield is a detective (played by Barbara Anderson) on "Ironside" (1967–71)
- Hanne Wilhemsen is a Norwegian police inspector and closeted lesbian in a book series debuted 1993 by Norwegian Anne Holt. Books in the series are: Blind Goddess, Blessed are Those Who Thirst, 1222, Death of the Demon, What is Mine, What Never Happens, Fear Not, and Death in Oslo.
- Lila Wilkins is a former reporter, employed by literary agency, in Buried in a Book (2012), the first book in a proposed series by Lucy Arlington.
- Cassidy Williams (Angel Dynamite was an amateur detective belonging to a previous incarnation of Mystery Incorporated, in Scooby-Doo! Mystery Incorporated.
- Catherine Willows is a crime scene investigator played by Marg Helgenberger on the 2000–2015 CBS series CSI: Crime Scene Investigation.
- Hildegarde Withers is a school teacher and amateur investigator in a series of books by American mystery novelist Stuart Palmer (debuted 1931). Played by Edna May Oliver in the films The Penguin Pool Murder (1932), Murder on the Blackboard (1934), and Murder on a Honeymoon (1935); by Helen Broderick in Murder on a Bridle Path (1936); by ZaSu Pitts in The Plot Thickens (1936) and Forty Naughty Girls (1937); and by Eve Arden in A Very Missing Person (1972).
- Hannah Wolfe is a private investigator in a trilogy of novels – Birth Marks, Fatlands, and Under My Skin – by English novelist Sarah Dunant (debuted 1991).
- Hazel Wong (real name: Wong Fung Ying) is a Chinese schoolgirl who attends an English boarding school in the book series Murder Most Unladylike by Robin Stevens where as vice-president and Secretary of a Detective Society she solves various murder mysteries with the help of her friend the Honourable Daisy Wells.
- April Woo is a Chinese-American New York police detective in a book series by Leslie Glass (author) including Burning Time, Hanging Time, etc.
- Shelby Woo is the title teen detective on The Mystery Files of Shelby Woo which screened 1996–1998 on Nickelodeon.
- Persephone Wright, the protagonist of the Suffrajitsu graphic novel series, moonlights as a detective in The Isle of Dogs, a novella by Michael Lussier.
- Sheil B. Wright created by Ann Morven is a dunce at deduction but well versed in human folly. These whodunits blend chills and chuckles (2012) The Right Royal Bastard, Murder Piping Hot, The Seventh Petal, and The Killing of Hamlet.
- Xie Yaohuan (谢瑶环) is a fictional member of the court of the Empress Wu Zetian who originally appeared in Tian Han's Xie Yaohuan eponymous 1961 Peking opera allegorically condemning the Great Leap Forward, where she was ultimately forced to sacrifice herself as a matter of principle. The character was subsequently rebooted as the heroine of The Shadow of Empress Wu (Riyue Lingkong), broadcast from 2007 to 2008 on CCTV, and of Imperial Tang Female Inspector (Da Tang Nü Xun An), first broadcast on Dragon TV in 2011. In all three, she is tasked with investigating various problems and uncovering provincial malfeasance for the imperial court.

== Y ==
- Bubbles Yablonsky is a high-energy beautician and rookie journalist who supplies beauty product recipes in screwball mysteries by Sarah Strohmeyer begun 2001
- Rachel Young is an FBI Special Agent and Dr. Jacob Hood's handler in The Eleventh Hour (2008–09)
- Nero Yuzurizaki (譲崎 ネロ Yuzurizaki Nero?) is a girl detective with the gift of controlling machines through use of a piece of metal – and is an operative of the Milky Holmes Detective Agency in various products by the Tantei Opera Milky Holmes media franchise.

== Z ==
- Charlie Zailer is a policewoman in psychological crime novels by Sophie Hannah, debuted 2006 with Little Face. Charlie was played by Olivia Williams in a 2011 two part television drama, Case Sensitive, based on Hannah's 2008 novel The Point of Rescue.

== See also ==
- Lists of authors
- List of mystery writers
- List of thriller authors
- List of female detective/mystery writers
- List of fictional detective teams
- List of male detective characters
- Detective fiction
- Crime fiction
- Mystery fiction
- Whodunit
- Sisters in Crime
