= List of women mystery writers =

Mystery fiction is a genre in which the nature of an event, usually a murder or other crime, remains mysterious until the end of the story.

== A–C ==
- Megan Abbott (born 1971)
- Christine Adamo (born 1965)
- Deborah Adams
- Harriet Stratemeyer Adams (pseudonyms: Carolyn Keene, Franklin W. Dixon) (1892–1982)
- Jane Adams (born 1960)
- Carolina Garcia-Aguilera (born 1949)
- Joan Aiken (1924–2004)
- Catherine Aird (1930–2024)
- Susan Wittig Albert (born 1940)
- Goldie Alexander (1936–2020)
- Shana Alexander (1925–2005)
- Tasha Alexander (born 1969)
- Margery Allingham (1904–1966)
- Karin Alvtegen (born 1965)
- Lin Anderson
- Donna Andrews
- Sarah Andrews (1951–2019)
- Charlotte Armstrong (1905–1969)
- Kate Atkinson (born 1951)
- Rosemary Aubert (1946–2024)
- Bunty Avieson (born 1962)
- Marian Babson (pseudonym for Ruth Marian Stenstreem) (1929–2017)
- Deb Baker (born 1953)
- Jo Bannister (born 1951)
- Linda Barnes (born 1949)
- Nevada Barr (born 1952)
- Lynne Barrett (born 20th century)
- Belinda Bauer (born 1962)
- Jean Bedford (1946–2025)
- Josephine Bell (1897–1987)
- Margot Bennett (1912–1980)
- Mildred Benson (1905–2002)
- Laurien Berenson
- Carole Berry
- Lauren Beukes (born 1976)
- Claudia Bishop (pseudonym for Mary Stanton) (born 1947)
- Cara Black (born 1951)
- Suzanne Blanc (1915–1999)
- Eleanor Taylor Bland (1944–2010)
- Enid Blyton (1897–1968)
- Geraldine Bonner (1870–1930)
- Miriam Borgenicht (1915–1992)
- Roxanne Bouchard (born 1972)
- Gail Bowen (born 1942)
- Rhys Bowen (pseudonym for Janet Quin-Harkin) (born 1941)
- Leigh Brackett (1915–1978)
- P. J. Brackston (pseudonym for Paula Brackston)
- Christianna Brand (1907–1988)
- Lilian Jackson Braun (1913–2011)
- Rita Mae Brown (born 1944)
- Sandra Brown (born 1948)
- Edna Buchanan (born 1939)
- Marie Buchanan (1922–2010)
- Fiona Buckley (1937–2024)
- Jan Burke (born 1953)
- Gwendoline Butler (1922–2013)
- Janet Caird (1913–1992)
- Susanna Calkins (born 1971)
- Dana Cameron (born 1965)
- Karen Campbell (born 1967)
- Dorothy Cannell (born 1943)
- Bernice Carey (1911–1990)
- Patricia Carlon (1927–2002)
- Margaret Carr (born 1935) (pseudonyms: Martin Carroll, Carole Kerr, Belle Jackson)
- Felicity Winifred Carter (1906–1995)
- Vera Caspary (1899–1987)
- Sarah Caudwell (1939–2000)
- Jessie Chandler (born 1968)
- Kate Charles (born 1950)
- Marion Chesney (pseudonym: M. C. Beaton) (1936–2019)
- Agatha Christie (1890–1976)
- Jill Churchill (1943–2023)
- Carol Higgins Clark (1956–2023)
- Mary Higgins Clark (1927–2020)
- Anna Clarke (1919–2004)
- Ann Cleeves (born 1954)
- Jane Cleland
- Judy Clemens
- Blaize Clement (1932–2011)
- Barbara Cleverly (born 1940)
- Liza Cody (born 1944)
- Margaret Coel (born 1937)
- Kate Collins
- Sheila Connolly (1950–2020)
- Patricia Cornwell (born 1956)
- Frances Cowen (pseudonym: Eleanor Hyde) (1915–1992)
- Katherine Cowley
- Cleo Coyle
- Frances Crane (1896–1981)
- Deborah Crombie (born 1952)
- Amanda Cross (pseudonym for Carolyn Heilbrun) (1926–2003)
- Ursula Curtiss (1923–1984)

== D–G ==
- Mary Daheim (1937–2022)
- Elizabeth Daly (1878–1967)
- Barbara D'Amato (born 1938)
- Jordan Dane (born 1953)
- Denise Danks
- Diane Mott Davidson (born 1949)
- Carol Anne Davis (born 1961)
- Dorothy Salisbury Davis (1916–2014)
- Lindsey Davis (born 1949)
- Mildred B. Davis
- Janet Dawson (born 1949)
- Marele Day (born 1947)
- Miriam Allen deFord (1888–1975)
- Vicki Delany (born 1951)
- Eileen Dewhurst (1929–2025)
- Doris Miles Disney (1907–1976)
- Joanne Dobson (born 1942)
- Thea Dorn (born 1970)
- Carole Nelson Douglas (1944–2021)
- Eileen Dreyer
- June Drummond (1923–2011)
- Stella Duffy (born 1963)
- Sarah Dunant (born 1950)
- Sandy Frances Duncan (born 1942)
- Susan Dunlap (born 1943)
- Carola Dunn (born 1946)
- Mignon G. Eberhart (1899–1996)
- Kerstin Ekman (born 1933)
- Amelia Ellis (born 1977)
- Kathy Lynn Emerson
- Maggie Estep (1963–2014)
- Janet Evanovich (born 1943)
- Elizabeth Eyre (pseudonym for Jill Staynes and Margaret Storey)
- Linda Fairstein (born 1947)
- Diane Fanning (born 1950)
- Jerrilyn Farmer
- Elizabeth Fenwick and E. P. Fenwick (pseudonyms for Elizabeth Fenwick Way)
- Mary Fitt (pseudonym for Kathleen Freeman) (1897–1959)
- Joanne Fluke (born 1943)
- Gillian Flynn (born 1971)
- Elena Forbes
- Karin Fossum (born 1954)
- Earlene Fowler (born 1954)
- Barbara Fradkin
- Ariana Franklin (pseudonym for Diana Norman) (1933–2011)
- Miles Franklin (1879–1954)
- Anthea Fraser (born 1930)
- Antonia Fraser (born 1932)
- Margaret Frazer (pseudonym for Gail Frazer and Mary Monica Pulver Kuhfeld) (1946–2013)
- Celia Fremlin (1914–2009)
- Tana French (born 1973)
- Inger Frimansson (born 1944)
- Gayleen Froese (born 1972)
- Frances Fyfield (born 1948)
- Gillian Galbraith
- Menna Gallie (1920–1990)
- Carolina Garcia-Aguilera (born 1949)
- Lisa Gardner (born 1972)
- Anne George (1927–2001)
- Elizabeth George (born 1949)
- Tess Gerritsen (born 1953)
- Alison Gordon (1943–2015)
- Dolores Gordon-Smith (born 1958)
- Nancy Grace (born 1959)
- Sue Grafton (1940–2017)
- Caroline Graham (born 1931)
- Sara Gran (born 1971)
- Ann Granger (1939–2025)
- Alex Gray (born 1950)
- Anna Katharine Green (1846–1935)
- Kerry Greenwood (1954–2025)
- Martha Grimes (born 1931)
- Beth Groundwater
- Elizabeth Gunn (1927–2022)

== H–L ==
- Jane Haddam (1951–2019)
- Jean Hager (born 1932)
- Patricia Hall (pseudonym for Maureen O'Connor) (1940–2024)
- Lyn Hamilton (1944–2009)
- Petra Hammesfahr (born 1951)
- Sophie Hannah (born 1971)
- Karen Harper (1945–2020)
- Charlaine Harris (born 1951)
- Cynthia Harrod-Eagles (born 1948)
- Ellen Hart (born 1949)
- Carolyn Hart (born 1936)
- Frances Noyes Hart (1890–1943)
- L. C. Hayden (1949–2025)
- Mo Hayder (1962–2021)
- Sylvia Haymon (1918−1995)
- Sparkle Hayter (born 1958)
- Libby Fischer Hellmann
- Sue Henry (1940–2020)
- Joan Hess (1949–2017)
- Georgette Heyer (1902–1974)
- Patricia Highsmith (1921–1995)
- Susan Hill (born 1942)
- Elisabeth Sanxay Holding (1889–1955)
- Isabelle Holland (1920–2002)
- Liz Holliday
- Hazel Holt (1928–2015)
- Wendy Hornsby (born 1947)
- Linda Howard (born 1950)
- Dorothy B. Hughes (1904–1993)
- Julie Hyzy
- Shirley Jackson (1916–1965)
- P. D. James (1920–2014)
- J. A. Jance (born 1944)
- Charlotte Jay (1919–1996)
- Maureen Jennings (born 1939)
- Linda O. Johnston
- Alison Joseph (born 1958)
- Morag Joss (born 1955)
- Mari Jungstedt (born 1962)
- Susan Kandel
- Faye Kellerman (born 1952)
- Karen Kijewski (born 1943)
- Laurie R. King (born 1952)
- Natsuo Kirino (born 1951)
- Elsa Klensch (1933–2022)
- Harley Jane Kozak (born 1957)
- Rochelle Majer Krich (1947–2025)
- Lynda La Plante (born 1943)
- Camilla Läckberg (born 1974)
- Lori L. Lake (born 1960)
- Maria Lang (1914–1991)
- Virginia Lanier (1930–2003)
- Åsa Larsson (born 1966)
- Emma Lathen (pseudonym for Mary Jane Latsis and Martha Henissart) (1927–1997)
- Donna Leon (born 1942)
- Constance Lindsay Taylor (1907–2000)
- Elizabeth Linington (1921–1988)
- Gillian Linscott (born 1949)
- Laura Lippman (born 1959)
- Frances Lockridge (with husband Richard Lockridge)(1896–1963)
- Gabrielle Lord (born 1946)
- Lisa Lutz (born 1970)

== M–Q ==
- Marianne Macdonald (1934–2019)
- Jeanne Mackin
- Charlotte MacLeod (1922–2005)
- Mary Jane Maffini
- Jessica Mann (1937–2018)
- Alexandra Marinina (born 1957)
- Liza Marklund (born 1962)
- Margaret Maron (1938–2021)
- Ngaio Marsh (1895–1982)
- Bodil Mårtensson (born 1952)
- Sujata Massey (born 1964)
- Francine Mathews (born 1963)
- Helen McCloy (1904–1994)
- Sharyn McCrumb (born 1948)
- Val McDermid (born 1955)
- [

[Patricia McGerr|Patricia (Pat) McGerr]] (1919–1985)

- Jill McGown (1947–2007)
- Fiona McIntosh (pseudonym: Lauren Crow) (born 1960)
- Mary McMullen (1920–1986) (pseudonym for Mary Reilly)
- Claire McNab (1940–2022)
- Penny Mickelbury (born 1948)
- Margaret Millar (1915–1994)
- Denise Mina (born 1966)
- Dreda Say Mitchell (born 1965)
- Gladys Mitchell (1901–1983)
- Miyuki Miyabe (born 1960)
- Gwen Moffat (born 1924)
- Susan Moody (born 1940)
- Tara Moss (born 1973)
- Patricia Moyes (1923–2000)
- Marcia Muller (born 1944)
- Margaret Murphy (born 1959)
- Beverle Graves Myers (born 1951)
- Magdalen Nabb (1947–2007)
- Barbara Nadel
- Janet Neel (born 1940)
- Barbara Neely (1941–2020)
- Katherine Neville (born 1945)
- Sharan Newman (born 1949)
- Helen Nielsen (1918–2002)
- Joan Lowery Nixon (1927–2003)
- Asa Nonami (born 1960)
- Maureen O'Brien (born 1943)
- Carol O'Connell (born 1947)
- Lillian O'Donnell (1926–2005)
- Kelly Oliver (born 1958)
- Baroness Orczy (1865–1947)
- Perri O'Shaughnessy (pseudonym for sisters Pamela and Mary O'Shaughnessy)
- Abigail Padgett (born 1942)
- Sara Paretsky (born 1947)
- P. J. Parrish (pseudonym for sisters Kelly Nichols and Kristy Montee)
- Barbara Paul (1931–2022)
- Phyllis Paul (1903–1973)
- Rebecca Pawel (born 1977)
- Joanne Pence
- Stef Penney (born 1969)
- Louise Penny (born 1958)
- Anne Perry (1938–2023)
- Elizabeth Peters (pseudonym for Barbara Mertz (1927–2013)
- Ellis Peters (pseudonym for Edith Pargeter) (1913–1995)
- Nancy Pickard (born 1945)
- Catherine Louisa Pirkis (1841–1910)
- Genevieve Pou (wrote under pseudonym Genevieve Holden, 1919–2007)
- Janet Quin-Harkin (born 1941)

== R–Z ==
- Caro Ramsay
- Ellen Raskin (1928–1984)
- Robyn Read
- Leigh Redhead (born 1971)
- Jean M. Redmann (born 1955)
- Kathy Reichs (born 1948)
- Helen Reilly (1891–1962)
- Ruth Rendell (1930–2015)
- Craig Rice (pseudonym for Georgiana Ann Randolph Craig) (1908–1957)
- Mary Roberts Rinehart (1876–1958)
- Nora Roberts (pseudonym: J.D. Robb) (born 1950)
- Lynda Suzanne Robinson (born 1951)
- Audrey Roos (1912–1982)
- M. J. Rose
- Kate Ross (1956–1998)
- Jennifer Rowe (born 1948)
- S. J. Rozan (born 1950)
- Jane Rubino
- Dorothy L. Sayers (1893–1957)
- Andrea Maria Schenkel (born 1962)
- Manda Scott (born 1962)
- Lisa Scottoline (born 1955)
- Augusta Huiell Seaman (1879–1950)
- Mabel Seeley (1903–1991)
- Barbara Seranella (1956–2007)
- Doris Shannon (pseudonym: E. X. Giroux) (1924–2012)
- Yrsa Sigurðardóttir (born 1963)
- Jenny Siler (born 1971)
- Dorothy Simpson (1933–2020)
- Maj Sjöwall (1935–2020) (in collaboration – Sjöwall and Wahlöö)
- Karin Slaughter (born 1971)
- April Smith
- Joan Smith (born 1953)
- Julie Smith (born 1944)
- Sarah Smith (born 1947)
- Caro Soles
- Nancy Spain (1917–1964)
- Julia Spencer-Fleming (born 1961)
- Dana Stabenow (born 1952)
- Susannah Stacey (pseudonym for Jill Staynes and Margaret Storey)
- Kelli Stanley (born 1964)
- Viveca Sten (born 1959)
- Robin Stevens (born 1988)
- Mary Stewart (1916–2014)
- Sarah Strohmeyer (born 1962)
- Denise Swanson
- Phoebe Atwood Taylor (1909–1976)
- Josephine Tey (1896–1952)
- Annie O. Tibbits (1871–1957)
- Masako Togawa (1933–2016)
- P. J. Tracy (pseudonym for Patricia Lambrecht and Traci Lambrecht)
- Camilla Trinchieri (born 1942)
- Kathy Hogan Trocheck (born 1954)
- Helene Tursten (born 1954)
- Dorothy Uhnak (1930–2006)
- Fred Vargas (pseudonym for Frédérique Audoin-Rouzeau) (born 1957)
- Elaine Viets (born c. 1950)
- Lucy Wadham (born 1964)
- Mary Willis Walker (1942–2023)
- Minette Walters (born 1949)
- Penny Warner
- Betty Webb
- Martha G. Webb (pseudonym of Anne Wingate) (1943–2021)
- Patricia Wentworth (1878–1961)
- Valerie Wilson Wesley (born 1947)
- Ethel Lina White (1846–1944)
- Phyllis A. Whitney (1903–2008)
- Kate Wilhelm (1928–2018)
- Margaret Wetherby Williams (writing as Margaret Erskine) (1901–1984)
- Laura Wilson (born 1964)
- Anne Wingate (1943–2021)
- Jacqueline Winspear (born 1955)
- Paula L. Woods (born 1953)
- Sara Woods (1922–1985)
- L. R. Wright (1939–2001)
- Margaret Yorke (1924–2012)
- Eve Zaremba (1930–2025)

== See also ==
- Lists of writers
- List of mystery writers
- List of thriller authors
- List of female detective characters
- Detective fiction
- Crime fiction
- Mystery fiction
- Whodunit
