= Tess Collins =

American novelist and theatre manager

- Born: Middlesboro, Kentucky, U.S.
- Education: University of Kentucky (BA); Union Institute & University (PhD)
- Occupations: Novelist; theatre manager
- Website: www.tesscollins.com/books.html

Tess Collins is an American novelist and theatre manager.

== Early life ==
Tess Collins was born in Middlesboro, Kentucky. She received a BA in journalism from the University of Kentucky, where she also studied creative writing with Kentucky Poets Laureate Gurney Norman and James Baker Hall, and with novelist and essayist Ed McClanahan. She received the Oswald Award for Creative Writing, and her first poems appeared in The Wandering Foot, a literary journal published by the University of Kentucky Department of English.

== San Francisco ==
Collins moved to San Francisco in 1979. While working in theater management she participated in the Master Workshops of Bay Area author James N. Frey. Eventually she became manager of San Francisco's Curran Theatre. Best known as an author of novels, Collins has also crafted a nonfiction book and plays. She holds a Ph.D. in theater management from the Union Institute and University.

== Suspense thrillers ==
In 1997, Collins's first novel, The Law of Revenge, was published by Ballantine Books. It concerns a San Francisco attorney returning to her Appalachian hometown, where in her teens she was the victim of a brutal gang rape. Responding to a call from her estranged family, she must defend her brother from a murder charge, but her pursuit of the truth is clouded since the prosecuting attorney was once the boy responsible for her rape. In this novel Collins established what were to become two major themes in her writing: the internal journey of victimized women toward empowerment, and the ambiguous relationships between the natural and supernatural.

The second and third novel of her Appalachian thriller series, The Law of the Dead followed in 1999 and The Law of Betrayal in 2003, the third of these being a ForeWord Magazine Book of the Year finalist.

== Mythic storytelling ==
Having previously written commercial suspense thrillers for a mass market publisher, Collins remarked, "I had to choose between writing to the market and writing the stories I wanted to tell." Her previous fiction contained mythic elements, but then she moved further toward what she has termed "myth-based fiction, as opposed to metafiction." The short story "Scarlet Ribbons," published in the magazine Space and Time, received an honorable mention in The Year's Best Fantasy and Horror (2004), edited by Ellen Datlow, Kelly Link and Gavin J. Grant. Helen of Troy (BearCat Press, 2012) blends realism and mythic themes to achieve psychological observations, often humorous, on marriage and small-town life. Notown (BearCat Press, 2013), the first of the Midnight Valley Quartet, combines graphic realism with magical realism as it traces "a day in the life of a woman who decides to kill her husband." The Hunter of Hertha, the second of the Midnight Valley Quartet, is forthcoming.

== Nonfiction ==
Collins's guide to professional theatre management, How Theater Managers Manage, was published in 2003 by Scarecrow Press. She has also authored articles on writing for Byline Magazine and The Writer, and "Trees at Granny's House," an essay reflecting on her childhood.

== Plays ==
Her first play, Tossing Monte, was produced in San Francisco in 1997. Further works as a playwright include Barbarians and a dramatic version of Helen of Troy.

== See also ==
- List of female detective/mystery writers
- List of female detective characters
