= Jane Rubino =

American novelist

Jane Rubino is an author of mystery novels set in New Jersey, featuring entertainment reporter ‘Cat’ Fortunati Austen as an accidental detective. The books feature Cat's close knit Italian-American family and the diverse people of New Jersey. Cat is a widow and a relationship with homicide detective Victor Cardenas develops in the books.

With her daughter, Caitlen Rubino-Bradway, she has also written Lady Vernon and Her Daughter, inspired by Jane Austen's novella ‘'Lady Susan’' and the short story "What Would Austen Do?" that appeared in the anthology "Jane Austen Made Me Do It." Rubino has also written several short stories for MX Publishing's Sherlockian anthologies, The MX Books of New Sherlock Holmes Stories.

== Books ==
- Death of a DJ, 1995
- Fruitcake, 1997
- Cheat the Devil, 1998
- (Contributor) Homicide for the Holidays, 2000
- Plot Twist: A Cat Austen/ Victor Cardenas Mystery, 2000
- Knight Errant: The Singular Adventures of Sherlock Holmes, 2001
- Deadly Morsels: Cake Job, 2003
- Raise the Dead, 2004
- Lady Vernon and Her Daughter, 2009
- Hidden Fires: A "Holmes Before Baker Street" Adventure, 2022

== See also ==
- List of female detective characters
- List of female detective/mystery writers
- Mystery fiction
- Crime fiction
