= Joanne Pence =

American novelist

- Born: Joanne Lopez; San Francisco, California, U.S.
- Education: University of California, Berkeley
- Occupation: Author
- Spouse: David Pence
- Children: 2

Joanne Pence is the author of a long running and romantic culinary mystery series. Fourteen books were published from 1993 to 2006.

Pence's amateur sleuth, Angie Amalfi, is an underemployed food writer and gourmet chef in San Francisco. Amalfi is romantically involved with homicide inspector Paavo Smith. As well as fitting in the culinary mystery niche, Pence's books are followed by romance genre enthusiasts. The novels have a humorous, screwball adventure flavor.

Joanne Pence was born Joanne Lopez in San Francisco. She attended the University of California, Berkeley and worked from 1970 to 1998 as an operations analysis manager in the Social Security Administration. She is married to David Pence and has two children.

She is a member of Sisters in Crime, Novelists, Inc, and Romance Writers of America.

== Books ==
- Something’s Cooking, 1993.
- Too Many Cooks, 1994.
- Cooking up Trouble, 1995.
- Cooking Most Deadly, 1996.
- Cook’s Night Out, 1998.
- Cooks Overboard, 1998.
- A Cook in Time, 1999.
- To Catch a Cook, 00.
- Bell, Book and Candle, 02.
- If Cooks Could Kill, 03
- Two Cooks a Killing, 03.
- Courting Disaster, 04.
- Red Hot Murder, 06.
- The Da Vinci Cook, 06.
- The Thirteenth Santa ’11. Novella
- Misteltoe and Mayhem (with Judi McCoy, Katherine Hall Page and Christi Ridgeway), 2004. (non series)

== See also ==
- List of female detective/mystery writers
- List of female detective characters
