= Rei Shimura =

- First appearance: The Salaryman's Wife
- Created by: Sujata Massey

In-universe information
- Gender: Female
- Occupation: Antiques expert
- Nationality: American

Rei Shimura is a fictional amateur sleuth and antiques expert who features in a series of mystery novels written by Sujata Massey. Her character is first introduced in the novel The Salaryman's Wife, in which she unravels the murder of a woman on a sight-seeing trip

== Character history ==
Born in San Francisco, California, Rei Shimura was raised in the United States by her Japanese father and (Caucasian) American mother before emigrating to Tokyo. While in Japan, she worked in a succession of jobs, ranging from columnist for the Gaijin Times to antiques dealer.

Rei Shimura is described as appearing more Japanese than Caucasian, and she is often mistaken to be of full Japanese ancestry when in the United States. In Japan, she is regarded as a foreigner despite her fluent Japanese and she still has difficulty with the written language.

Rei Shimura's mother is a member of the influential Howard family, but in The Pearl Diver Massey indicates that only one member of this family, Kendall Howard, reaches out to Rei when she moves to Washington D.C. All of her father's family live in Japan, and Rei has a close relationship with her cousin, Tom Shimura, and her aunt, Norie.

== List of novels ==
- The Salaryman's Wife (1997)
- Zen Attitude (1998)
- The Flower Master (1999)
- The Floating Girl (2000)
- The Bride's Kimono (2001)
- The Samurai's Daughter (2003)
- The Pearl Diver (2004)
- The Typhoon Lover New York: Harper, 2005. ISBN 9780060765125, OCLC 637348032
- Girl in a Box (2006)
- Shimura Trouble London: Severn House, 2008. ISBN 9781847510549, OCLC 809416203
- The Kizuna Coast (December 2014)
