= Helen Smith (writer) =

English novelist and dramatist

- Born: Brixton, London, England
- Occupations: Novelist, dramatist
- Writing career
- Period: 1999-present
- Genres: Fiction, Mystery, Dystopian, Children's
- Website: helensmithbooks.com www.emperorsclothes.co.uk

Helen Smith is an English novelist and dramatist. She is a member of the Mystery Writers of America, English PEN and the Crime Writers' Association. She lives in Brixton, London.

== Biography ==
Helen Smith is a novelist and playwright who lives in London. She has one daughter, Lauren, with the writer Damon Rochefort. When her daughter was small, they travelled extensively in Australia, South East Asia, Hong Kong and South America before returning to the UK where her first novel, Alison Wonderland, was published.

Helen Smith was a winning writer in the IRDP London Playwrights Festival and was the recipient of an Arts Council Award for The Miracle Inspector. Her novels have been optioned for development by the BBC. She volunteers as a writing mentor with the Write to Life group run by the Medical Foundation for the Care of Victims of Torture.

== Bibliography ==
Novels

- 2014 Beyond Belief (Emily Castles Mystery) ISBN 1477849726
- 2013 Invitation to Die (Emily Castles Mystery) ISBN 1477807306
- 2012 The Miracle Inspector ISBN 978-0956517050
- 2011 Showstoppers ISBN 0956517064
- 2010 Three Sisters ISBN 0956517072
- 2000 Being Light ISBN 0-7538-1435-8
- 1999 Alison Wonderland ISBN 978-1-935597-75-9

Short Stories

- 2014 Purple, Silver, Olive, Orange ISBN 978-1505784442
- 2014 The Memory Man ISBN 978-1503177109
- 2014 Real Elves ISBN 978-0956517081

Children's Books

- 2004 Pirates, Swashbucklers & Buccaneers of London ISBN 1-904153-17-8
- 2002 Grave-Robbers, Cut-throats & Poisoners of London ISBN 1-904153-00-3

Anthologies

- 2016 Killer Women Crime Club Anthology 978-1527200715
- 2014 The London Stories ISBN 978-0956517098
- 2014 Six Pack of Sleuths ASIN B00N9HTAPC
- 2013 Naughty or Nice ASIN B00HBZ1KY2
- 2009 Freed Speech: Modern Poetry in Translation Series 3 No. 12 ISBN 978-0-955906-42-8

== Theatre ==
2010 The Memory Man Arcola Theatre, London
2009 Purple, Silver, Olive, Orange Arcola Theatre, London
2007 The Psychic Detective National Theatre Watch This Space and touring

== Radio drama ==
1995 Looking for Baby Jesus
