= Suzanne Arruda =

American writer

- Born: Indiana, U.S.
- Writing career
- Genre: Mystery
- Notable work: Mark of the Lion
- Website: www.suzannearruda.com

Suzanne Arruda is the author of the Jade del Cameron mystery series, which follows the protagonist through her adventures on safari in Africa. She has also written some children's and young adult titles as well as writing for newspapers and magazines including Oasis, Pockets, Cricket, Boys' Life, Christian Science Monitor, and Her Voice. She is a part-time instructor at Pittsburg State University in Pittsburg, Kansas.

== Selected works ==
Jade del Cameron Mystery from Penguin Books

- Mark of the Lion (2006) ISBN 0-451-21748-9. According to WorldCat, the book is in 1137 libraries
- Stalking Ivory (2007) ISBN 0-451-22026-9 According to WorldCat, the book is in 836 libraries
- The Serpent's Daughter (2008) ISBN 0-451-22294-6
- The Leopard's Prey (2009) ISBN 0-451-22586-4
- Treasure of the Golden Cheetah (2009) ISBN 0-451-22789-1
- The Crocodile's Last Embrace (2010) ISBN 0-451-23117-1
- Devil Dance (2015) ISBN 1506011314

Children and young adult titles

- A Stocking for Jesus, Pauline Books and Media, (2005) ISBN 0-8198-7076-5
- The Girl He Left Behind, Avisson Press, (2004) ISBN 1-888105-67-4
- Freedom's Martyr, Avisson Press, (2003) ISBN 1-888105-55-0
- From Kansas to Cannibals, Avisson Press, (2001) ISBN 1-888105-50-X
- A Field Guide to the Metric System [or] How to Survive in the Wilderness of Numbers, PITSCO/Lego-Dacta, (1994)
