= Lillian O'Donnell =

American writer (1926–2005)

Lillian O'Donnell (March 15, 1926 – April 2, 2005) was an American crime novelist notable for being one of the first to introduce a female police officer as the lead character in a book series.

== Biography ==
She was born in Trieste, Italy but spent most of her life in New York City. She studied at the American Academy of Dramatic Arts, New York and her first career was in the theatre - as an actress on stage and television and as first female stage manager on Broadway. Until 1954, she worked as a director and stage manager of summer stock packages for The Shubert Organization. In 1954, she married J. Leonard O'Donnell.

From 1960, she published ten stand-alone novels. They varied from fairly stock murder mysteries to novels of psychological suspense. Only one, The Face of the Crime, was a police procedural. In 1972, her first book with Nora Mulcahaney The Phone Calls was published. It brought back characters from her earlier police novel, but with the addition of the female lead. In total, 17 books were published in this series, the last in 1998. Each book focused on a single major crime and Nora's concerns about her personal life were intertwined with her working life.

In 1977, 1979 and 1980, she tried an interesting idea in a separate series - a protagonist, Mici Anhalt, who is an investigator for a Crime Victims Compensation Board. In 1990, she moved with the times, following other women who had begun series centered on female private detectives. In total, she published four books with lead character Gwen Rammadge, a genteel woman turned private investigator to pay the bills.

One of the Norah Mulcahaney books, No Business Being a Cop was filmed for TV as Prime Target, starring Angie Dickinson, Joseph Bologna and David Soul.

== Books ==
- Death on the Grass, 1959.
- Death Blanks the Screen, 1960.
- Death Schuss, 1963.
- Murder under the Sun, 1964.
- Death of a Player, 1964.
- Babes in the Woods, 1965.
- The Sleeping Beauty Murders, 1967.
- The Tachi Tree, 1968.
- The Face of the Crime, 1968.
- Dive into Darkness, 1971.

Norah Mulcahaney series

- The Phone Calls, 1972.
- Don't Wear Your Wedding Ring, 1973.
- Dial 577-RAPE, 1974.
- The Baby Merchants, 1975.
- Leisure Dying, 1976.
- No Business Being a Cop, 1979.
- The Children's Zoo, 1981.
- Cop without a Shield, 1983.
- Lady Killer, 1984.
- Casual Affairs, 1985.
- The Other Side of the Door, 1987.
- A Good Night to Kill, 1989.
- A Private Crime, 1991.
- Shadow in Red, 1998.
- Pushover, 1992.
- Lockout, 1994.
- Blue Death, 1998.

Mici Anhalt series

- Aftershock, 1977.
- Falling Star, 1979.
- Wicked Designs, 1980.

Gwenn Ramadge series

- A Wreath for the Bride, 1990.
- Used to Kill, 1993.
- The Raggedy Man, 1995.
- The Goddess Affair, 1996.

== See also ==
- Lists of authors
- List of mystery writers
- List of thriller authors
- List of female detective characters
