= Minerva Koenig =

American architect

Minerva Koenig (born 1960) is an American author based in Texas who writes the Julia Kalas mystery series, published by St. Martin's Minotaur. Kalas is a short, rotund mafia widow of mixed ethnicity in her late 30s who is sent to the fictional small town of Azula, Texas, by the United States Federal Witness Protection Program after her husband is killed by the Aryan Brotherhood.

Nine Days, the first book in the series, was released in September 2014. South of Nowhere was released in February 2016, and was included in Texas Monthly's "Checklist" of recommended books for February 2016.

Koenig's work often addresses issues of feminism, racism, and Texas border politics. She has appeared at a number of book festivals including the Texas Book Festival.

Koenig was born in Berkeley, California and grew up in Galveston, Texas. She is an architect.
