= Lizzie Newton: Victorian Mysteries =

South Korean manhwa series

Lizzie Netwon: Victorian Mysteries
- Front cover of the English translation of Lizzie Newton: Victorian Mysteries, Volume 1.
- Genre: Mystery
- Author: Hey-jin Jeon (story); Ki-ha Lee (art)
- Publisher: (South Korea) Daewon C.I.
- English publisher: (United States) Seven Seas Entertainment
- Original run: 2011–2013
- Volumes: 6

Lady Detective, published in English as Lizzie Newton: Victorian Mysteries, is a Korean manhwa series, written by Hey-jin Jeon and drawn by Ki-ha Lee. It began serialization in 2011 in Daiwon C.I. Issue manhwa magazine. The series revolves around the title character, a young woman from Victorian England who works as a mystery author, who also solves real-life mysteries and crimes. The series is set in the same fictional universe as the Sherlock Holmes stories, but in an earlier period, so Holmes is still a boy, and other Holmes characters appear as younger versions of themselves in the story.

== Plot ==
Set in London in 1864, the stories centre on the adventures of Elizabeth "Lizzie" Newton. She works as an author, writing the popular mystery series McMorning, Private Tutor and Sleuth for Gentlemen's Own magazine under the male pseudonym of Logica Docens. Other than writing, her passions are collecting books (extending the library of her late father) and conducting chemical experiments. Her close friends and family however, believe that she would better off settling down and marrying her long-term fiancé Edwin White. White works as steward to Lizzie to be closer to her, but before doing so he was a master barrister, nicknamed "The White Devil of the Courtroom".

The series revolves around Lizzie and Edwin, as they come into contact with various crimes and mysteries during their work, and try to solve the cases. Much of the drama in the series involves other characters, usually male, and their sexist treatment toward Lizzie. Amongst these characters include Inspector Charles B. Gray, reportedly the most competent policeman in the police force, and Andrew R. Kenneth, the president of Gentlemen's Own who gets annoyed by Lizzie's behaviour.

== Setting ==
Lizzie Newton: Victorian Mysteries is set in the same universe as the Sherlock Holmes stories, but in the year 1864, at which point, Jeon writes: "Holmes is still just a boy here because this story takes place seventeen years before Holmes and Watson would live together on Baker Street."

Several Sherlock Holmes characters make appearances in the series as younger versions of themselves. In the first volume of strips, Inspector Lestrade appears an officer working alongside Inspector Gray. In the second volume, Professor Moriarty appears as a student and is mostly referred to by his first name James.

== Reception ==
Reviews of the series have ranged from positive to mixed. Heart of Manga have the series a four out of five rating saying: "Mystery and romance, attractive artwork, and well developed characters make this volume a highly entertaining read", and, "While the mystery in the first volume is a rather simple one, Lizzie and Edwin are able to prove the case using scientific evidence."

Ian Wolf, writing for the British MyM magazine gave a mixed review writing that, "It could be argued that the story is rich in clichés", and, "The dialogue is a bit odd in places", but also that, "The art is rather good though."

Brigid Alverson for MTV Geek gave a mixed review to the first volume writing: "The story is set in 1864 among the British upper crust, and it makes the most of both the period setting and Victorian attitudes toward women. In fact, it leans way too hard on those attitudes, presenting Lizzie as a smart, independent woman who spends so much time fuming at her sexist contemporaries that it takes away from the story at hand. ... It would be nice to see this series evolve into a good mystery series, rather than stay on the shallow level of the spunky girl who rebels at the society she lives in."

A review of the series for the Anime News Network by Rebecca Silverman gave it an "A−" grading, but wrote critically about the use of clothing in the first volume saying: "Ki-ha Lee's artwork fits almost seamlessly into the world that Hey-jin Jeon evokes. Backgrounds and buildings look appropriately Victorian, albeit sans the plethora of knickknacks popular at the time. (But what a pain to draw, yes?) Clothing has a little more trouble. While Lizzie and the other upper class ladies wear the bell-shaped skirt popular at the time, lady's maid Jane's clothing is from the 1890s. With the skirt widths being so drastically different between the two decades, this is distracting. On the plus side, Lizzie moves as if she is wearing a corset, never bending from the waist and even crouching with her knees out to the sides. Another nice touch is that Lee occasionally uses portraits and photos from the Victorian era when discussing people or developments from history, reminding us that this story takes place in the real world rather than a facsimile thereof."
