= Carole Berry =

American mystery fiction writer

Carole Berry is an American mystery fiction writer who is best known for her amateur sleuth series featuring New York City office temp worker Bonnie Indermill. Berry also has one suspense novel to her credit, titled Nightmare Point.

== Works ==
The Bonnie Indermill series:

- The Letter of the Law. New York: St. Martin's Press. 1987. ISBN 0-312-01059-1.
- The Year of the Monkey. New York: St. Martin's Press. 1988. ISBN 0-312-01850-9.
- Goodnight, Sweet Prince. New York: St. Martin's Press. 1990. ISBN 0-312-03840-2.
- Island Girl. New York: St. Martin's Press. 1991. ISBN 0-373-28026-2.
- The Death of a Difficult Woman. New York: Berkley Prime Crime. 1994. ISBN 0-425-14356-2.
- The Death of a Dancing Fool. New York: Berkley Prime Crime. 1996. ISBN 0-425-15143-3.
- Death of Dimpled Darling. New York: Berkley Prime Crime. 1997. ISBN 0-425-16097-1.
- Death of a Downsizer. New York: Berkley Prime Crime. 1999. ISBN 0-425-16614-7.

Suspense:

- Nightmare Point. New York: St. Martin's Press. 1993. ISBN 0-312-08889-2.

== Reception ==
The Chicago Tribune praised her for her debut novel, The Letter of the Law, stating she had "made an immediate impact".

== Reviews ==
- The Death of a Dancing Fool: The Bookwatch March 1996 v17 p4, Library Journal Dec 1995 v120 n20 p162,
- The Death of a Difficult Woman: Kirkus Reviews Oct 15, 1994 v62 p1371, Publishers Weekly Oct 24, 1994 v241 n43 p54
- The Year of the Monkey: Armchair Detective Winter 1989 v22 p78, The Bookwatch March 1996 v17 p4, Kirkus Reviews May 15, 1988 v56 p724, Publishers Weekly April 29, 1988 v233 n17 p68
- The Letter of the Law: The Practical Lawyer July 1988 v34 n5 p89(7), Tribune Books (Chicago) Dec 27, 1987 p4, Booklist Dec 1, 1987 v84 p605 Kirkus Reviews Dec 1, 1987 v55 p1650, Publishers Weekly Oct 30, 1987 v232 n18 p56
- Good Night, Sweet Prince: Publishers Weekly Jan 12, 1990 v237 n2 p49, Kirkus Reviews Feb 1, 1990 v58 p140, Booklist Feb 15, 1990 v86 p1142
- Island Girl: Kirkus Reviews Oct 1, 1991 v59 p1247, Publishers Weekly Sep 27, 1991 v238 n43 p46, Library Journal Sep 1, 1991 v116 n14 p234
- Nightmare Point: Publishers Weekly Feb 8, 1993 v240 n6 p80, Kirkus Reviews Feb 1, 1993 v61 p99, Library Journal Feb 1, 1993 v118 n2 p116(1)
