= Jane Adams (writer) =

English thriller writer

- Born: 1960 (age 65–66); Leicester, England
- Education: Degree in Sociology
- Occupation: Novelist
- Children: 2
- Writing career
- Language: English
- Years active: 1995–present
- Genres: Psychological thriller, crime fiction
- Notable work: The Greenway (1995)
- Notable awards: Authors' Club Best First Novel Award

Jane Adams (born 1960 in Leicester) is a British writer of psychological thrillers, and has published more than thirty novels.

Her first book, The Greenway, was nominated for a John Creasey Award in 1995 and received an Authors' Club Best First Novel Award.

Adams has a degree in sociology, was once lead vocalist in a folk rock band and is married with two children. She lives in Leicester. Adams teaches at De Montfort University. She is a Royal Literary Fund fellow.

== Selected works ==
=== Novels ===
- Bird (1997)
- Dangerous to Know (2004)
- A Kiss Goodbye (2005)

==== Detective Mike Croft series ====
- The Greenway (1995)
- Cast the First Stone (1996)
- Fade to Grey (1998)
- Final Frame (1999)

==== Sergeant Ray Flower series ====
- The Angel Gateway (2000)
- Like Angels Falling (2001)
- Angel Eyes (2002)

==== Naomi Blake series ====
- Mourning the Little Dead (2002)
- Touching the Dark (2003)
- Heatwave (2005)
- Killing a Stranger (2006)
- Legacy of Lies (2007)
- Blood Ties (2010)
- Night Vision (2011)
- Secrets (2013)
- Gregory's Game (2014)
- Paying the Ferryman (2014)
- A Murderous Mind (2016)
- Fakes and Lies (2018)

==== Rina Martin series ====
- A Reason to Kill (2007)
- Fragile Lives (2008)
- The Power of One (2009)
- Resolutions (2010)
- The Dead of Winter (2011)
- Cause of Death (2012)
- Forgotten Voices (2015)
