= Francine Mathews =

American journalist

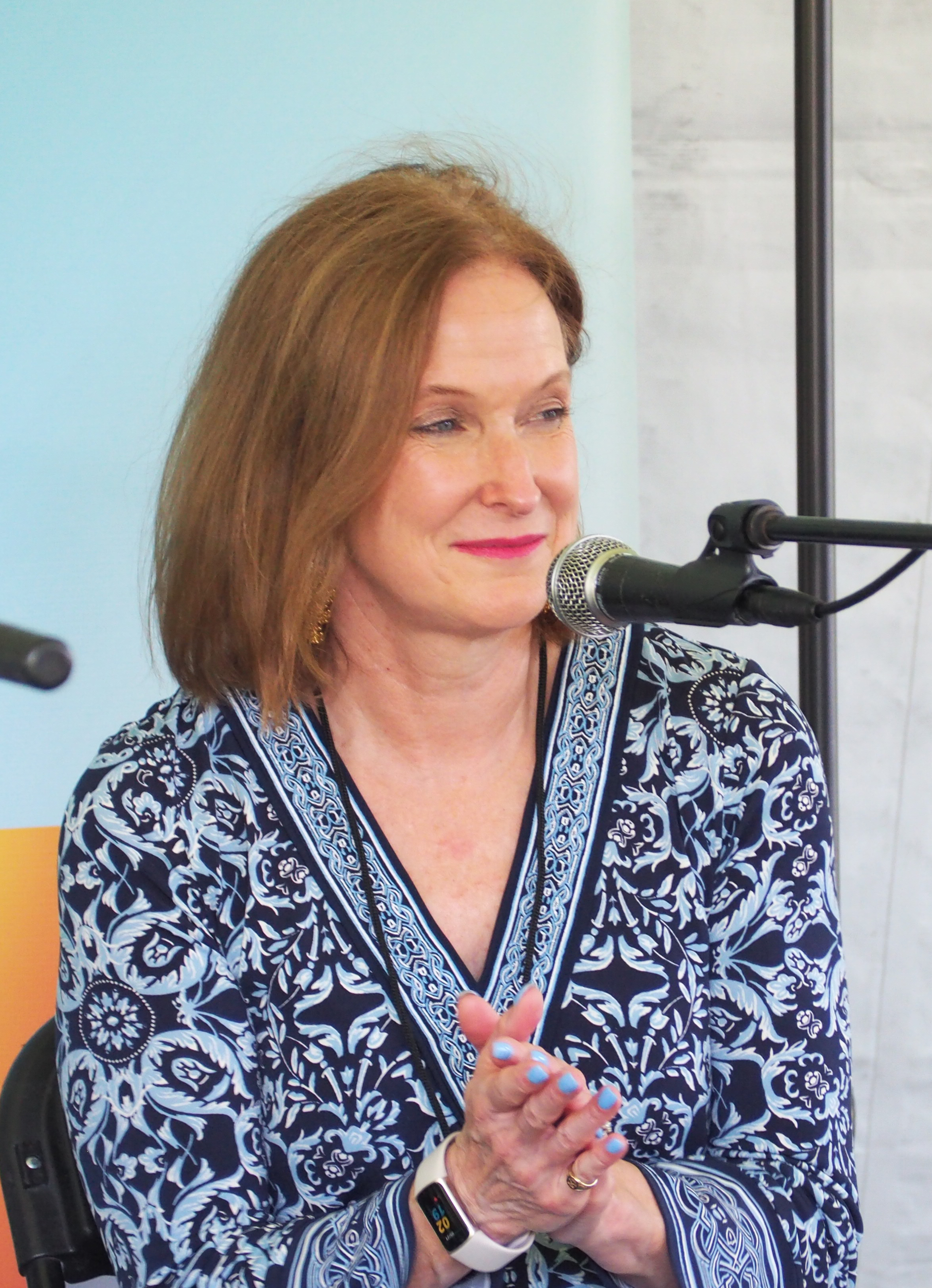
- Born: May 23, 1963 (age 63); Binghamton, New York, U.S.
- Education: Georgetown Visitation Preparatory School; Princeton University; Stanford University
- Writing career
- Genres: Mysteries, spy fiction, historical fiction
- Notable work: Jane Austen series
- Website: www.francinemathews.com

Francine Barron Mathews (born May 23, 1963) is an American writer of mystery and spy fiction who also writes historical mysteries under the name Stephanie Barron. She features in Great Women Mystery Writers (2007).

== Biography ==
Francine Stephanie Barron was born in Binghamton, New York, and grew up in Washington, D.C., the youngest of six sisters. She graduated from Georgetown Visitation Preparatory School, then earned a degree at Princeton University in European History. While there, she wrote for the university newspaper, which led to later jobs with The Miami Herald and The San Jose Mercury News. She pursued an MA at Stanford University in Latin American History, but left to work at the CIA for several years as an intelligence analyst. After the publication of her first book, she started writing full-time, citing John McPhee (who taught her at Princeton) and Elizabeth George as particular influences. She lives in Denver, Colorado, with her children and husband. Her husband, Mark, is a prominent lawyer in the area. Her eldest son, Sam, also went on to study at Princeton. Her youngest son, Stephen, went on to study at Penn State and is on the fencing team.

== Writing ==
As Francine Mathews, she has written two series: one set in Nantucket featuring police officer Meredith "Merry" Folger, the latest in a long line of police officers in her family, including her father who is also her boss. Indeed, family and genealogy play an important part of the series. Mathews has stated that with this series she tried to "capture the difficult life in New England today" and the "bitter and embedded economic issues" facing the fishing industry. Her second series are spy thrillers based on her time working with the CIA.

As Stephanie Barron (her middle and maiden names), Mathews has written historical novels featuring the English novelist Jane Austen as an amateur sleuth. The books are presented as lost diaries merely edited by Barron. Mathews has carried out considerable research into Austen as background to the series, especially using Austen's correspondence as a key source.

== Published books ==
=== As Francine Mathews ===
==== Merry Folger series ====
1. Death in the Off Season (1994)
2. Death in Rough Water (1995)
3. Death in a Mood Indigo (1997)
4. Death in a Cold Hard Light (1998)
5. Death on Nantucket (2017)
6. Death on Tuckernuck (2020)

==== Caroline Carmichael series ====
1. The Cut Out (2001)
2. Blown (2005)

==== Other novels ====
1. The Secret Agent (2002)
2. The Alibi Club (2006)
3. Jack 1939 (2012)
4. Too Bad to Die (2015)

=== As Stephanie Barron ===
==== Jane Austen series ====
1. Jane and the Unpleasantness at Scargrave Manor (1996)
2. Jane and the Man of the Cloth (1997)
3. Jane and the Wandering Eye (1998)
4. Jane and the Genius of the Place (1999)
5. Jane and the Stillroom Maid (2000)
6. Jane and the Prisoner of Wool House (2001)
7. Jane and the Ghosts of Netley (2003)
8. Jane and His Lordship's Legacy (2005)
9. Jane and the Barque of Frailty (2006)
10. Jane and the Madness of Lord Byron (2010)
11. Jane and the Canterbury Tale (2011)
12. Jane and the Twelve Days of Christmas (2014)
13. Jane and the Waterloo Map (2016)
14. Jane and the Year Without a Summer (2022)
15. Jane and the Final Mystery (2023)

==== Other novels ====
- A Flaw in the Blood (2008)
- The White Garden (2009)
- That Churchill Woman (2020)
