= Patricia Hall (novelist) =

Patricia Hall (1940 – 22 March 2024) was the pseudonym used by journalist Maureen O'Connor in writing crime novels featuring reporter Laura Ackroyd and DCI Michael Thackeray.

== Biography ==
Maureen O'Connor was born in Bradford, West Yorkshire in 1940. She graduated from Birmingham University and worked at the BBC, and Evening Standard. She then spent 16 years creating, editing and writing for the education section of The Guardian before switching to freelance journalism and fiction writing. She has a husband and two sons and lived in Oxford.

== Writing ==
The major series produced by Hall features reporter Laura Ackroyd and police detective Michael Thackeray. The series is set in Bradford and confronts issues of 'environmentalism, class and race discrimination'.

She had started writing a new series based around photographer Kate O'Donnell and set in 1960s London.

== Bibliography ==
=== Ackroyd and Thackeray series ===
- Death by Election (1993)
- Dying Fall (1994)
- In the Bleak Midwinter (1995) a.k.a. The Dead of Winter
- Perils Of The Night (1997)
- The Italian Girl (1998)
- Dead on Arrival (1999)
- Skeleton at the Feast (2000)
- Deep Freeze (2001)
- Death in Dark Waters (2002)
- Dead Reckoning (2003)
- False Witness (2004)
- Sins of the Fathers (2005)
- Death in a Far Country (2007)
- By Death Divided (2008)
- Devil's Game (2009)
- Dust to Dust (2011)

=== Kate O'Donnell series ===
- Dead Beat (2011)
- Death Trap (2012)
- Dressed to Kill (2013)
- Blood Brothers (2014)
- Deep Waters (2016)
- Cover Up (2017)
- Playing with Fire (2018)

=== Other novels ===
- The Poison Pool (1991)
- The Coldness of Killers (1992)
- The Masks of Darkness (2004)
