= Abigail Padgett =

American author of mystery novels (born 1942)

- Born: May 13, 1942 (age 84); Vincennes, Indiana, U.S.
- Education: Indiana University Bloomington; University of Missouri
- Occupation: Author
- Writing career
- Genre: Mystery fiction
- Website: abigailpadgett.wordpress.com

Mary Abigail Padgett (born May 13, 1942, in Vincennes, Indiana) is an American author of mystery novels who features in Great Women Mystery Writers (2007).

== Biography ==
Padgett graduated in 1964 from Indiana University Bloomington with a degree in education, then earned a master's in counselling from the University of Missouri in 1969; between the two she taught high school English in St. Louis. She then had several different jobs before becoming a court investigator for Child Protective Services in San Diego, a post she left in 1988 to concentrate on writing and advocacy for children and the mentally ill. She also attended Washington University in St. Louis.

== Writing ==
Padgett's first series concerns Barbara "Bo" Bradley, a child protection advocate investigator in San Diego who has bipolar disorder. Her second series features Blue McCarron, a reclusive lesbian social psychologist.

Padgett maintains a blog.

In 2023 Padgett was awarded the Alice B Readers Award.

== Bibliography ==
=== Bo Bradley series ===
- Child of Silence (1993)
- Strawgirl (1994)
- Turtle Baby (1995)
- Moonbird Boy (1996)
- The Dollmaker's Daughters (1997)
- Stork Boy (2019)

=== Blue McCarron series ===
- Blue (1998)
- The Last Blue Plate Special (2001)
- Ultimate Blue (2022)

=== Taylor Blake Magical Mystery ===
- The Paper Doll Museum (2012)

=== Morgan's Bay ===
- A Kiss at Morgan's Bay (2018)
- A Secret at Morgan's Bay (2018)

=== Other novels ===
- Bone Blind (2011)
- An Unremembered Grave (2014)

=== Collections ===
- Mandy Dru Mysteries (2015)
