= Amelia Ellis =

British-German novelist and photographer

- Born: 23 September 1977 (age 49); Hamburg, Germany
- Occupations: Novelist, photographer
- Writing career
- Genre: Mystery
- Subject: Lesbian fiction
- Movement: LGBT literature

Amelia Ellis (born 23 September 1977) is a British-German novelist and photographer best known for her mystery series featuring London private investigator Nea Fox.

Her themes include guilt and redemption, integrity, courage and sacrifice, but also friendship, love and various aspects of lesbian relationships. Urban loneliness is another major subject of her books.

Ellis' protagonist is a pensive but tough post-feminist woman in her early thirties searching for answers to life's persistent questions, often finding them in the course of her investigations.

Her novels contain elements of hardboiled fiction, cozies and classic detective stories and cannot easily be assigned to a specific genre of mysteries.

As a photographer, Ellis works primarily in the field of street photography. She is best known for her black and white pictures of London. Ellis is taking part in the London-based art project Camden17.

== Work ==
Nea Fox Series

- The Lion's Circle (2005)
- Lilies on Sand (2006)
- The Fourth Aspect (2008)
- The Pearl Dragon (2010)
- The Mirror of Muraro (2018)
  - Lambda Literary Award for Lesbian Mystery finalist
- The Trail of Tears (2026)
