= Laurien Berenson =

American writer

- Occupation: Novelist
- Writing career
- Pen name: Laurien Blair, Laurien Berenson
- Period: 1983–present
- Genres: Murder mystery, Romance novel, Young adult
- Notable work: Melanie Travis Mysteries
- Website: www.laurienberenson.com

Laurien Berenson is an American writer of murder mystery and romance novels since 1983; in her earlier career she used the pen name Laurien Blair. She is most noted for her Melanie Travis Mysteries series, and her novels have been published in several languages.

She is a winner of the Romantic Times Reviewers' Choice Award, and a four-time winner of the Maxwell Award (presented by the Dog Writers Association of America). She has been nominated for both the Agatha and Macavity awards.

She currently lives in Kentucky with her family.

== Bibliography ==
=== As Laurien Blair ===
==== Romance ====
- Sweet Temptation, Silhouette Desire #105. 1983
- Between The Covers, Silhouette Desire #130. 1984
- That Special Magic, Silhouette Desire # 210. 1985
- Taken By Storm, Silhouette Desire #243. 1985

=== As Laurien Berenson ===
==== Romance ====
- Come As You Are, Bantam Loveswept #109. 1985
- Winner Take All, Harlequin American Romance #210. 1987
- Lucky in Love, Harlequin Temptation #255. 1989
- Talisman, Harlequin Temptation #310. 1990
- The Sweetheart Deal, Harlequin Temptation #368. 1991

==== Young adult ====
- Double Dare, First Love/Silhouette #208. 1986

==== Psychological suspense ====
- Night Cries. 1992
- Deep Cover. 1994

==== Melanie Travis Mysteries series ====
In the Melanie Travis series of murder mysteries, the primary protagonist is a school teacher, Melanie Travis, who owns and shows several full size pedigree Standard Poodles. All of her (mis)adventures involve the dog show circuit in varying degrees, providing an entertaining view into the world of raising and showing dogs.

1. A Pedigree To Die For. 1995. ISBN 978-1-5756-6003-5.
2. Underdog. 1996. ISBN 1-5756-6108-X.
3. Dog Eat Dog. 1996. ISBN 1-5756-6103-9.
4. Hair of the Dog. 1997. ISBN 1-5756-6222-1.
5. Watchdog. 1998. ISBN 1-5756-6350-3.
6. Hush Puppy. 1999. ISBN 1-5756-6469-0.
7. Unleashed. 2000. ISBN 1-5756-6596-4.
8. Once Bitten. 2001. ISBN 1-5756-6677-4.
9. Hot Dog. 2002. ISBN 1-5756-6781-9.
10. Best in Show. 2003. ISBN 1-5756-6783-5.
11. Jingle Bell Bark. 2004. ISBN 1-5756-6758-4.
12. Raining Cats & Dogs. 2005. ISBN 0-7582-0813-8.
13. Chow Down. 2006. ISBN 0-7582-0815-4.
14. Hounded To Death. 2007. ISBN 0-7582-1603-3.
15. Doggie Day Care Murder. 2008. ISBN 978-0-7582-1604-5.
16. Gone with the Woof. September 2013. ISBN 978-0-7582-8452-5.
17. Death of a Dog Whisperer. August 2014. ISBN 978-0-7582-8455-6.
18. The Bark Before Christmas. July 28, 2015. ISBN 978-0-7582-8458-7.
19. A Christmas Howl. October 27, 2015, eBook only

Also, books below. Note: Sources contradict on book numbering due to the novella "A Christmas Howl." Some current books are missing below.

-Live and Let Growl. May 30, 2017. ISBN 978-1496703408.

-Wagging Through The Snow. September 25, 2018. ISBN 978-1496712998.

-Ruff Justice . May 28, 2019. ISBN 978-1496703484.

==== Short stories ====
- Sleeping Dogs Lie in CANINE CRIMES ANTHOLOGY, edited by Jeffrey Marks. 1998.

This story was nominated for an Agatha Award and Macavity Award.

== References and sources ==
- http://www.laurienberenson.com
