= Marianne Macdonald =

Canadian writer (1934–2019)

- Born: July 9, 1934 Kenora, Ontario, Canada
- Died: December 18, 2019 (aged 85) London, England
- Occupation: Novelist
- Period: 20th century
- Genre: Mystery

Marianne G. Macdonald (July 9, 1934 – December 18, 2019) was a Canadian children's books author and novelist, best known for her mystery series featuring London antiques bookstore owner and amateur investigator Dido Hoare.

The main themes of the Dido Hoare novels are responsibility and trust, the struggles of a single working mother and a complex and troubled father-daughter relationship.

Macdonald died in London, England on December 18, 2019, at the age of 85.

== Work ==
Dido Hoare Series

- Death's Autograph (1996)
- Ghost Walk (1997)
- Smoke Screen (1999)
- Road Kill (2000)
- Blood Lies (2001)
- Die Once (2002)
- Three Monkeys (2005)
- Faking It (2006)

Children's Books

- Black Bass Rock (1952)
- Smuggler's Cove (1955)
- The Treasure of Ur (1958)
- The Pirate Queen (1991)
- The Eighty-Nine Pennies of Emma Jones (1992)
- The Witch Repair (1995)
- Dragon for Sale (1998)

Literary Criticism

- The State of Literary Theory Today (ed.) (1982)
- Ezra Pound: Purpose/Form/Meaning (1983)
- Ezra Pound and History (ed.) (1985)
