= Anne George (writer) =

American writer

- Born: Anne Carroll Bell; December 4, 1927 Montgomery, Alabama, United States
- Died: March 14, 2001 (aged 73) Birmingham, Alabama, United States
- Occupation: Teacher; author; poet
- Period: 1980–2001
- Genre: Detective fiction, Poetry

Anne Carroll George (1927-2001) was an American author and poet. A collection of her poetry, Some of it is True (1993, Curbow Publications), was nominated for the Pulitzer Prize in 1993, and her Southern Sisters mystery series was honored with the coveted Agatha Award. She graduated from Samford University and was Alabama's 1994 state poet and cofounder of Druid Press. George died in 2001 of complications during heart surgery.

== Bibliography ==
- Dreamer, Dreaming Me (1980)
- Wild Goose Chase (1982)
- Spraying Under the Bed for Wolves (1985, Druid Press)
- Some of it is True (1993, Curbow Publications)
- This One and Magic Life: A Novel of a Southern Family (1999)
- The Map that Lies Between Us (2000, Black Belt Press)

=== Southern Sisters Mysteries ===
1. Murder on A Girls' Night Out (1996)
2. Murder on A Bad Hair Day (1996)
3. Murder Runs in the Family (1997)
4. Murder Makes Waves (1997)
5. Murder Gets A Life (1998)
6. Murder Shoots the Bull (1999)
7. Murder Carries A Torch (2000)
8. Murder Boogies with Elvis (2001)
