= Jo Bannister =

British crime fiction novelist

- Born: 31 July 1951 (age 75); Rochdale, Lancashire
- Occupation: British crime fiction novelist

Jo Bannister (born 31 July 1951 in Rochdale, Lancashire) is a British crime fiction novelist.

== Life and work ==
She began her career as a journalist and rose to become editor of the County Down Spectator before resigning to devote all her time to her writing. She has had over 30 novels published both in English and translated into several other languages. Most of these belong to five series, while nine are standalone novels. Her books are well reviewed, with the New York Times, for example, referring to her "solid series of British police procedurals", and praising the Castlemere novels for their "superb character work" in the context of a "deeply satisfying series".

== Clio Rees and Harry Marsh novels ==
- Striving with Gods (a.k.a. An Uncertain Death) (1984)
- Gilgamesh (1989)
- The Going Down of the Sun (1989)
- The Fifth Cataract (2005)

== Mickey Flynn novels ==
- Shards (a.k.a. Critical Angle) (1990)
- Death and Other Lovers (1991)

== Castlemere novels ==
- A Bleeding of Innocents (1993)
- Charisma (a.k.a. Sins of the Heart) (1994)
- A Taste for Burning (a.k.a. Burning Desires) (1995)
- No Birds Sing (1996)
- Broken Lines (1998)
- The Hireling's Tale (1999)
- Changelings (2000)

== Rosie Holland novels ==
- The Primrose Convention (1997)
- The Primrose Switchback (2000)

== Brodie Farrell novels ==
- Echoes of Lies (2001)
- True Witness (2002)
- Reflections (2003)
- The Depths of Solitude (2004)
- Breaking Faith (2005)
- Requiem for a Dealer (2006)
- Flawed (2007)
- Closer Still (2008)
- Liars All (2009)

== Hazel Best & Gabriel Ash novels ==
- Deadly Virtues (2013)
- Perfect Sins (2014)
- Desperate Measures (2015)
- Other Countries (2017)
- Kindred Spirits (2018)

== Standalone novels ==
- The Matrix (1981)
- The Winter Plain (1982)
- A Cactus Garden (1983)
- Mosaic (1986)
- The Mason Codex (a.k.a. Unlawful Entry) (1988)
- The Lazarus Hotel (1996)
- Tinderbox (2006)
- From Fire and Flood (2007)
- Fathers and Sins (2008)
- Death in High Places (2011)
