= Judy Clemens =

American novelist

- Occupation: Writer
- Writing career
- Period: 2004 – present
- Genre: Novel

Judy Clemens is a successful American novelist. She lives in NE Texas and is married with two children. Clemens is best known for the Stella Crown and Grim Reaper mystery series. Her first novel was nominated for the Agatha and Anthony Awards for Best First Novel. In 2009-10 she served as president of the international literary organization Sisters in Crime. Clemens became a reviewer at New York Journal of Books in 2018.

== Works ==
The Grim Reaper series:

- Embrace the Grim Reaper (2006)
- The Grim Reaper's Dance (2010)
- Flowers for Her Grave (2011)
- Dying Echo (2012)

Stella Crown series:

- Till the Cows Come Home (2004)
- Three Can Keep A Secret (2005)
- To Thine Own Self Be True (2006)
- The Day Will Come (2007)
- Different Paths (2008)
- Leave Tomorrow Behind (2013)

Other:

- Lost Sons (2008)
