= Clarence Cottam =

Entomologist (1899–1974)

Clarence Cottam (January 1, 1899 – March 30, 1974) was an American conservationist, civil service employee in the United States Fish and Wildlife Service, and inaugural director of the Welder Wildlife Foundation. (Note: Although Clarence Cottam had no middle name, editors of his publications sometimes cited his name as "C. M. Cottam".)

== Biography ==
Clarence Cottam was born and grew up in St. George, Utah. During his teen years and early twenties, he worked as a farmhand and ranch hand. He studied at Dixie College from 1919 to 1920 and at the University of Utah in the summer of 1923. In May 1920 he married Margery Brown (1894–1975). For two years from 1920 to 1922 he served in the central United States as a missionary for the LDS Church. From 1922 to 1925 he was a school principal in Alamo, Nevada, where his wife Margarey also taught. In 1925 he matriculated at Brigham Young University (BYU), where he graduated in 1926 with a B.S. degree in zoology and entomology and in 1927 with an M.S. His master's thesis is entitled Distributional list of the birds in Utah. At BYU he was an instructor from 1926 to 1929.

In 1929 Cottam became a junior biologist with the U.S. Division of Biological Survey in Washington, D.C. In 1934 the Division of Biological Survey was reorganized as the Bureau of Biological Survey. Jay Norwood "Ding" Darling, the bureau's director, gave Cottam much of the responsibility for duck hunting regulations. Cottam was from 1931 to 1935 an assistant biologist, from 1935 to 1940 a senior biologist in charge of food habits in the Division of Wildlife Research. During the early years of his federal government career, he was also a part-time student at George Washington University, where he graduated in 1936 with a Ph.D. His Ph.D. thesis Food habits of North American diving ducks was the basis for a 140-page publication in 1939 by the United States Department of Agriculture. In 1939, the Bureau of Biological Survey was removed from the U. S. Department of Agriculture and assigned to the U. S. Department of the Interior. In 1940, the Bureau of Biological Survey and the Bureau of Fisheries were combined to form the U. S. Department of the Interior's Fish and Wildlife Service. In the Fish and Wildlife Service, Cottam was from 1940 to 1942 a senior biologist in charge of food habits and from 1942 to 1944 was in charge of economic wildlife investigations in the Division of Wildlife Research. From 1944 to 1946 he was the chief of the Division of Wildlife Research. For the Fish and Wildlife Service he served as assistant director briefly in 1944 and again as assistant director from 1946 to 1954, when he retired from federal government service. During his career, he was sent on assignments to every state in the US and most of the Canadian provinces, as well as Mexico and New Zealand.

In 1943 Cottam at the U. S. Fish and Wildlife Service was responsible for promoting Rachel Carson from junior aquatic biologist to aquatic biologist. He worked with her until 1952, when she retired from government service to write full time, and remained a close friend until she died in 1964. He provided her with valuable documentation on existing DDT research. In her 1962 book Silent Spring, she cited his investigations of the harmful effects of insecticides.

For the academic year 1954–1955 Cottam returned to BYU as a professor of biology and dean of the College of Biological and Agricultural Sciences and then went on leave of absence from 1955 to 1958, when he resigned from BYU. In 1955 Cottam became the director of the Welder Wildlife Foundation (the institution managing the Welder Wildlife Refuge) with W. Caleb Glazener as assistant director. Cottam served as director until his death in 1974, when Glazener became his successor as director. Cottam was the author or coauthor of about 250 scientific papers. He accumulated a comprehensive library of ornithological journals and textooks on American for the use of students at the Welder Wildlife Refuge.

In March 1974, Clarence Cottam died from cancer in Sinton, Texas. He was buried in Orem, Utah. His widow died in February 1975. At the time of her death, there were 4 daughters, 23 grandchildren, and 4 great-grandchildren.

== Awards and honors ==
Cottam was elected in 1934 a Fellow of the American Association for the Advancement of Science. He received in 1955 the Aldo Leopold Memorial Award of The Wildlife Society (TWS) and in 1961 the Audubon Medal of the National Audubon Society. In 1962 he received both the Frances K. Hutchinson Medal of the Garden Club of America and the Paul Bartsch Award of the Audubon Naturalist Society. He was the president from 1949 to 1950 of The Wildlife Society, from 1957 to 1958 of the Texas Ornithological Society (founded in 1953), and from 1960 to 1963 of the National Parks Association. The Texas Chapter of The Wildlife Society, with the Welder Wildlife Foundation, sponsors the Clarence Cottam Award to "recognize and promote student research excellence in wildlife biology, conservation, and management."

== Selected publications ==
=== Articles ===
- Cottam, Clarence (1936). "Food of the Limpkin" (PDF). Wilson Bulletin. 48 (1): 11–13. (See limpkin.)
- Lind, Joseph P., ed. (1964). "They Also Serve by Clarence Cottam and Ira N. Gabrielson". Waterfowl Tomorrow. Washington, D.C.: produced by the U. S. Bureau of Sport Fisheries and Wildlife, Fish and Wildlife Service, Department of the Interior; published by the U. S. Government Printing Office. pp. 527–535.

=== Books and monographs ===
- Cottam, Clarence; Hanson, Harold C. (1938). Food habits of some Arctic birds and mammals. Vol. 20. Chicago: Field Museum of Natural History. LCCN 41022524.
- Bourn, Warren Scudder; Cottam, Clarence (1950). Some biological effects of ditching tidewater marshes. Washington, DC: U. S. Government Printing Office. LCCN 51060139.
- Zim, Herbert Spencer; Cottam, Clarence (1951). Insects; a guide to familiar American insects. Golden Nature Guide. New York: Simon and Schuster. LCCN 51010558; illustrated by James Gordon Irving; 225 species in full color
  - 1956 edition. Simon and Schuster. LCCN 56058960.
  - 1961 edition. New York: Golden Press. 1961. LCCN 61008325.
  - Insects : a guide to familiar American insects. New York: St. Martin's Press. 2001. ISBN 1582381291. LCCN 2001271734; by Herbert S. Zim and Clarence Cottam; revised by Jonathan P. Latimer and Karen Stray Nolting and David Wagner; illustrated by James Gordon Irving and Susan Simon
- Woodbury, Angus Munn; Clarence Cottam (1962). Ecological studies of birds in Utah. Salt Lake City: University of Utah. LCCN 63063765.
- Cottam, Clarence; Trefethen, James B., eds. (1968). Whitewings; the life history, status, and management of the white-winged dove. Princeton, N.J.: Van Nostrand. LCCN 68019365; with contributions by G.B. Saunders, P.B. Uzzell, S. Gallizioli, W.H. Kiel, J.A. Ness, and J. Stair; paintings and drawings by Robert W. Hines; Whitewings, USGS Publications Warehouse
