= List of people from Danville, Illinois =

The following list includes notable people who were born or have lived in Danville, Illinois. For a similar list organized alphabetically by last name, see the category page People from Danville, Illinois.

== Arts and culture ==
Name	Image	Birth	Death	Known for	Association	Reference
Susan Wittig Albert		Jan 2, 1940		Fiction and non-fiction writer	Lived in Danville and area, 1946–1963; attended Lincoln, Garfield, DHS	
Morris Ankrum		Aug 28, 1896	Sep 2, 1964	Actor	Born in Danville	
Irving Azoff		Dec 13, 1947		Music and movie producer, chairman of Live Nation Entertainment and Ticketmaster	Attended school in Danville	
Todd E. Creason		May 26, 1967		Fiction and non-fiction writer		
Joshua Ferris		Nov 7, 1974		Novelist, author of Then We Came to the End	Born in Danville	
Gene Hackman		Jan 30, 1930	Feb 2025	Academy Award–winning actor	Raised in Danville	
Brett Haley		Aug 17, 1983		Film director	Born in Danville	
Ned Luke		Oct 4, 1958		Film, TV, and video game actor	Born in Danville	
Helen Morgan		Aug 2, 1900	Oct 9, 1941	Stage and screen star, subject of The Helen Morgan Story	Born in Danville	
Donald O'Connor		Aug 28, 1925	Sep 27, 2003	Film star and dancer	Grew up in Danville	
Bobby Short		Sep 15, 1924	Mar 21, 2005	Cabaret singer, TV and film star, and recording artist	Born in Danville	
Matthew Stover		Jan 29, 1962		Author		
Dick Van Dyke		Dec 13, 1925		Film, TV, and stage star	Raised in Danville	
Jerry Van Dyke		Jul 27, 1931	Jan 5, 2018	Film, TV, and stage star	Born and raised in Danville	
Kelly Jean Van Dyke		Jun 5, 1958	Nov 17, 1991	TV and adult film star	Born in Danville	
Helen Wells		1910	1986	Author of Nurse Cherry Ames books, volumes 1-7 and 17-27		

== Military ==
Name	Image	Birth	Death	Known for	Association	Reference
Kenneth D. Bailey		Oct 21, 1910	Sep 26, 1942	Medal of Honor recipient	Lived in Danville	
William T. Wood		June 19, 1854	December 18, 1943	U.S. Army brigadier general	Lived in Danville	

== Politics ==
Name	Image	Birth	Death	Known for	Association	Reference
Joseph Gurney Cannon		May 7, 1836	Nov 12, 1926	Speaker of the US House of Representatives (1903–1911)	Resided and died in Danville	
James A. Meeks		Mar 7, 1864	Nov 10, 1946	Member of the US House of Representatives (1933–1939)	Resided and died in Danville	
John Thomas Scopes		Aug 3, 1900	Oct 21, 1970	Teacher who went to trial for teaching evolution in a public school, in defiance of Tennessee's Butler Act, in the famous 1925 Scopes Monkey Trial	Lived in Danville as a teenager	
Rickey Williams Jr.		1977/1978		First African-American mayor of Danville	Raised in Danville	

== Space ==
Name	Image	Birth	Death	Known for	Association	Reference
Joseph R. Tanner		Jan 21, 1950		Astronaut	Born in Danville	

== Sports ==
Name	Image	Birth	Death	Known for	Association	Reference
Jason Anderson		Jun 9, 1979		Pitcher for the New York Mets, Cleveland Indians, and New York Yankees	Born in Danville	
Zeke Bratkowski		Oct 20, 1931	Nov 11, 2019	Quarterback and coach for seven National Football League teams	Born in Danville	
Keon Clark		Apr 16, 1975		Power forward for the six National Basketball Association teams	Born in Danville	
Bert Daniels		Oct 31, 1882	Jun 6, 1958	Outfielder for the New York Yankees and Cincinnati Reds	Born in Danville	
Jack Doan		Jun 12, 1972		Wrestling referee with the World Wrestling Entertainment	Lives in Danville	
Ben Howard		Jan 15, 1979		Pitcher for the San Diego Padres and Florida Marlins	Born in Danville	
Jim Marshall		May 25, 1931		Second baseman and manager for seven Major League Baseball teams	Born in Danville	
Al Myers		Oct 22, 1863	Dec 24, 1927	Second baseman for the Milwaukee Brewers, Philadelphia Quakers, Kansas City Cowboys and Washington Nationals	Born in Danville	
Curtis Redden		Feb 8, 1881	Jan 16, 1919	All-Western football player and coach; died in World War I	Born in Danville	
Trent Sherfield		Feb 25, 1996		Wide receiver for the Denver Broncos	Born in Danville	
Sterling Slaughter		Nov 18, 1941		Pitcher for the Chicago Cubs	Born in Danville	
Stephanie White		Jun 20, 1977		Purdue and WNBA player, Vanderbilt coach	Born in Danville	
Robin Yount		Sep 16, 1955		Hall of Fame center fielder and shortstop for the Milwaukee Brewers	Born in Danville	
