= Julie Campbell Tatham =

American writer (1908–1999)

- Born: Julie Campbell; June 1, 1908; Flushing, New York, United States
- Died: July 7, 1999 (aged 91); Alexandria, Virginia, United States
- Occupation: Novelist
- Spouse: Charles Tatham Jr.
- Children: 2
- Writing career
- Pen name: Julie Campbell; Julie Tatham; Julie Campbell Tatham; Julie C. Tatham
- Language: English
- Period: 1948-1958
- Genre: Children's literature
- Notable work: Trixie Belden

Julie Campbell Tatham (June 1, 1908 – July 7, 1999) was an American writer of children's novels, who also wrote for adults, especially on Christian Science. As Julie Campbell she was the creator of the Trixie Belden series (she wrote the first six) and the Ginny Gordon series. As Julie Tatham she also took over the Cherry Ames series and Vicki Barr series from Helen Wells.

== Biography ==
Julie Campbell was born on June 1, 1908, in Flushing, New York, United States. She was the seventh of ten children of Julia deFres (Sample) and Archibald Campbell, an Army general. She was also the granddaughter of an Army general.

On March 30, 1933, she married Charles Tatham Jr. and had two sons. In the 1940s, under her maiden name, she created two series for Whitman Publishing Co: the Ginny Gordon series and the popular Trixie Belden series, continued by other writers under the pseudonym Kathryn Kenny. Under her married name, she also wrote some books for Helen Wells's series: Cherry Ames and Vicki Barr. She wrote for more than ten years before retiring.

Julie Tatham died on July 7, 1999, in Alexandria, Virginia at the age of 91.

== Bibliography ==
=== As Julie Campbell ===
==== Ginny Gordon series ====
1. The Disappearing Candlesticks (1948)
2. The Missing Heirloom (1950)
3. The Mystery At the Old Barn (1951)
4. The Lending Library (1954)
5. The Broadcast Mystery (1956)

==== Trixie Belden series ====
1. The Secret of the Mansion (1948)
2. The Red Trailer Mystery (1950)
3. The Gatehouse Mystery (1951)
4. The Mysterious Visitor (1954)
5. The Mystery Off Glen Road (1956)
6. The Mystery in Arizona (1958)

==== Rin Tin Tin's stories ====
- Rinty (1954)

=== As Julie Tatham ===
==== Cherry Ames series ====
1. At Spencer (1949)
2. Night Supervisor (1950)
3. Mountaineer Nurse (1951)
4. Clinic Nurse (1952)
5. Dude Ranch Nurse (1953)
6. Rest Home Nurse (1954)
7. Country Doctor's Nurse (1955)

==== Vicki Barr Flight Stewardess Series ====
1. The Clue of the Broken Blossom (1950)
2. Behind the White Veil (1951)
3. The Mystery at Hartwood House (1952)
4. Peril over the Airport (1953)

=== As Julie C. Tatham ===
==== Single novels ====
- The Mongrel of Merryway Farm (1952)

==== Non-fiction ====
- The Old Testament Made Easy (1985)

=== As Julie Campbell Tatham ===
==== Single novels ====
- World Book of Dogs (1953)
- To Nick from Jan (1957)

== References and sources ==
The Cherry Ames Page. "The Cherry Ames Page: Julie Tatham". Netwrx Consulting Inc. Archived from the original on 2011-05-25.

== See also ==
- The Julie Campbell page on Trixie-Belden.com
