= Lee J. Ames =

American painter (1921–2011)

Lee Judah Ames (January 8, 1921 – June 3, 2011) was an American artist noted for his Draw 50... learn-to-draw books.

He was born in Manhattan, New York. His first job at age eighteen was at Walt Disney Studios. His career spanned working as an advertising artist, fine artist, cartoonist, designer, animation in-betweener, illustrator, and as an artist-in residence at Doubleday. His series of 26 Draw 50... books take a friendly and minimalist approach to teaching drawing while the books often contain no instructional text.

He enlisted in the military and served as a second lieutenant during World War II. He was a recipient of the Inkpot Award.

He was a founding member of the Berndt Toast Gang, the Long Island Chapter of the National Cartoonists Society.

Ames once reminiscenced on how the Berndt Toast Gang got its name: "When Creig Flessel, Bill Lignante, Frank Springer, Al Micale, and I got together to work for Hanna Barbera in the 1960s, we decided to have a lunch at Finnegan's Bar the last Thursday of every month. During that period, Creig brought Walter Berndt to join us. We fell in love with the cigar-smoking old-timer (look who's talking!), as he did with us. After a couple of years he passed away and left us grieving. Thereafter, whenever we convened on Thursdays, we'd raise a toast to Walter's memory. On one such, my big mouth opened and uttered, "Fellas, it's time for the Berndt toast!" I wasn't trying to be cute at the time, but I'm not displeased that it stuck and we became the Berndt Toast Gang, one of the largest branches of the National Cartoonists Society."

He and his wife Jocelyn resided for many years in Mission Viejo, California before returning to Long Island, NY.

== Written by Ames ==
- City Street Games. By Jocelyn and Lee Ames. New York: Holt, Rinehart and Winston, 1963.
- The Dot, Line, and Shape Connection, or, How to Be Driven to Abstraction. 1st ed. Garden City, NY: Doubleday, 1982.
- Draw 50 Airplanes, Aircraft, & Spacecraft. 1st ed. Garden City, NY: Doubleday, 1977.
- Draw 50 Aliens, UFO's Galaxy Ghouls, Milky Way Marauders, and Other Extraterrestrial Creatures By Lee J. Ames with Ric Estrada. 1st ed. New York: Doubleday, 1998.
- Draw 50 Animal Toons. By Lee J. Ames and Bob Singer. 1st ed. New York: Doubleday, 2000.
- Draw 50 Animals. 1st ed. Garden City, NY: Doubleday, 1974.
- Draw 50 Athletes. 1st ed. Garden City, NY: Doubleday, 1985.
- Draw 50 Beasties and Yugglies and Turnover Uglies and Things That Go Bump in the Night. 1st ed. New York: Doubleday, 1988.
- Draw 50 Birds. By Lee J. Ames with Tony D'Adamo. 1st ed. New York: Doubleday, 1996.
- Draw 50 Boats, Ships, Trucks & Trains. Garden City, NY: Doubleday, 1987, c1976.
- Draw 50 Buildings and Other Structures. 1st ed. Garden City, NY: Doubleday, 1980.
- Draw 50 Cars, Trucks, and Motorcycles. 1st ed. Garden City, NY: Doubleday, 1986.
- Draw 50 Cats. 1st ed. Garden City, NY: Doubleday, 1986.
- Draw 50 Dinosaurs and Other Prehistoric Animals. 1st ed. Garden City, NY: Doubleday, 1977.
- Draw 50 Dogs. 1st ed. Garden City, NY: Doubleday, 1981.
- Draw 50 Endangered Animals. By Lee J. Ames with Warren Budd. 1st ed. New York: Doubleday, 1992.
- Draw 50 Famous Caricatures. By Lee J. Ames and Mort Drucker. 1st ed. New York: Doubleday, 1990.
- Draw 50 Famous Cartoons. 1st ed. Garden City, NY: Doubleday, 1979.
- Draw 50 Famous Faces. 1st ed. Garden City, NY: Doubleday, 1978.
- Draw 50 Famous Stars, As Selected by Rona Barrett's Hollywood Magazine. 1st ed. Garden City, NY: Doubleday, 1982.
- Draw 50 Flowers, Trees, and Other Plants. By Lee J. Ames, with P. Lee Ames. 1st ed. New York: Doubleday, 1994.
- Draw 50 Holiday Decorations. By Lee J. Ames with Ray Burns. 1st ed, New York: Doubleday, 1987.
- Draw 50 Horses. 1st ed. Garden City, NY: Doubleday, 1984.
- Draw 50 Monsters, Creeps, Superheroes, Demons, Dragons, Nerds, Dirts, Ghouls, Giants, Vampires, Zombies, and Other Curiosa. 1st ed. Garden City, NY: Doubleday, 1983.
- Draw 50 People. By Lee J. Ames with Creig Flessel. 1st ed. New York: Doubleday, 1993.
- Draw 50 People of the Bible. By Lee J. Ames and Andre Le Blanc. 1st ed. New York: Doubleday, 1995.
- Draw 50 Sharks, Whales, and Other Sea Creatures. By Lee J. Ames with Warren Budd. 1st ed. New York: Doubleday, 1989.
- Draw 50 Vehicles: Selections form Draw 50 Boats, Ships, Trucks, and Trains, and Draw 50 Airplanes, Aircraft, and Spacecraft. Garden City, NY: Doubleday, 1977.
- Draw, Draw, Draw. 1st ed. Garden City, NY: Doubleday, 1962.
- Drawing with Lee Ames: From the Bestselling, Award-Winning Creator of the Draw 50 Series, A Proven Step-by-Step Guide to the Fundamentals of Drawing for All Ages. 1st ed. New York: Doubleday, 1990.
- How to Draw Star Wars Heroes, Creatures, Space-Ships, and Other Fantastic Things. New York: Random House, 1984.
- Make 25 Crayon Drawings of the Circus. 1st ed. Garden City, NY: Doubleday, 1980.
- Make 25 Felt-Tip Drawings Out West. 1st ed. Garden City, NY: Doubleday, 1980.

== Illustrated by Ames ==
- Brown, John Mason. Daniel Boone; The opening of the wilderness. Illustrated by Lee J. James. 1st ed. New York: Random House.
- Asimov, Isaac. Great Ideas of Science. Illustrated by Lee Ames. Boston: Houghton Mifflin, 1969.
- Blocksma, Mary. Amazing Mouths and Menus. Illustrated by Lee J. Ames. Englewood Cliffs, NJ: Prentice-Hall, 1986.
- Fenner, Phyllis R., comp. Circus Parade; Stories of the Big Top. Illustrated by Lee Ames. 1st ed. New York: Knopf, 1954.
- Freeman, Mae Blacker. You Will Go to the Moon. By Mae and Ira Freeman. Illustrated by Lee Ames. Rev. ed. New York: Beginner Books, 1971.
- Garst, Shannon. Big Foot Wallace of the Texas Rangers. Illustrated by Lee Ames. New York: Messner, 1951.
- Garst, Shannon. Three Conquistadors: Cortes, Coronado, Pizarro. Illustrated by Lee J. Ames. New York: J. Messner, 1947.
- Holl, Adelaide. Hide-and-Seek ABC. Pictures by Lee Ames. New York: Platt & Munk, 1971.
- Klimowicz, Barbara. The Great Green Apple War. Drawings by Lee J. Ames. Nashville: Abingdon Press, 1973.
- Klimowicz, Barbara. My Sister the Horse. Drawings by Lee Ames. Nashville: Abingdon Press, 1971.
- Knight, David C. The Battle of the Dinosaurs. Illustrated by Lee J. Ames. Englewood Cliffs, NJ: Prentice-Hall, 1982.
- Dinosaurs That Swam and Flew. Illustrated by Lee J. Ames. New York: Simon & Schuster Books for Young Readers, 1989; Englewood Cliffs, NJ: Prentice-Hall, 1985.
- Lauber, Patricia. All About the Planet Earth. Illustrated with Drawings by Lee J. Ames and with photos. New York: Random House, 1962.
- Leavitt, Jerome Edward. By Land, By Sea, By Air; The Story of Transportation. Illustrated by Lee Ames. New York: Putnam, 1969.
- MacClain, George. Graff-a-Doodle Doo. Conceived by Lee J. Ames; Written and illustrated by George MacClain. New York: Grosset & Dunlap, 1981.
- Manus, Willard. Sea Treasure. Illustrated by Lee J. Ames. 1st ed. Garden City, NY: Doubleday, 1961.
- McNeel, John P. The Brain of Man. Illustrated by Lee Ames. New York: Putnam, 1968.
- Ross, Frank Xavier. Stories of the States; A Reference Guide to the Fifty States and the U.S. Territories. New York: Crowell, 1969.
- Rowley, Anthony. Tool Chest. Syracuse, NY: L. W. Singer, 1967.
- Selsam, Millicent Ellis. Exploring the Animal Kingdom. Garden City, NY: Garden City Books, 1957.
- Silverstein, Alvin. Carl Linnaeus; The Man Who Put the World of Life in Order. By Alvin and Virginia Silverstein. New York: John Day, 1969.
- Silverstein, Alvin. Excretory System; How Living Creatures Get Rid of Wastes. By Alvin and Virginia B. Silverstein. Englewood Cliffs, NJ: Prentice-Hall, 1972.
- Silverstein, Alvin. Harold Urey; The Man Who Explored from Earth to Moon. By Alvin and Virginia Silverstein. New York: John Day, 1970.
- Silverstein, Alvin. Life in the Universe. By Alvin and Virginia B. Silverstein. Princeton, NJ: Van Nostrand, 1967.
- Silverstein, Alvin. Muscular System; How Living Creatures Move. By Alvin and Virginia B. Silverstein. Englewood Cliffs, NJ: Prentice-Hall, 1972.
- Silverstein, Alvin. The Origin of Life. By Alvin and Virginia B. Silverstein. Princeton, NJ: Van Nostrand, 1968.
- Silverstein, Alvin. The Reproductive System; How Living Creatures Multiply. By Alvin and Virginia B. Silverstein. Englewood Cliffs, NJ: Prentice-Hall, 1971.
- Silverstein, Alvin. The Skin: Coverings and Linings of Living Things. By Alvin and Virginia B. Silverstein. Englewood Cliffs, NJ: Prentice-Hall, 1972.
- Thurber, Walter. Exploring Earth Science. By Walter A. Thurber, Robert E. Kilburn, Peter S. Howell; illustrated by Lee Ames ... [et al.] Boston: Allyn and Bacon, 1976.
- Zim, Herbert Spencer. Commercial Fishing. By Herbert S. Zim and Lucretia Krantz. New York: Morrow, 1973.
- Zim, Herbert Spencer. Pipes and Plumbing Systems. By Herbert S. Zim and James R. Skelly. Illustrated with drawings by Lee J. Ames and Mel Erikson. New York: Morrow, 1974.
- Zim, Herbert Spencer. Telephone Systems. By Herbert S. Zim and James R. Skelly. New York: W. Morrow, 1971.
- Zim, Herbert Spencer. Tractors. By Herbert S. Zim and James R. Skelly. New York: Morrow, 1972.
