= Jane Flory =

American children's book author and illustrator

- Born: Jane Trescott; June 29, 1917; Wilkes-Barre, Pennsylvania
- Died: November 25, 2005 (aged 88); Philadelphia, Pennsylvania
- Education: Philadelphia Museum School of Industrial Art
- Writing career
- Genre: Children's literature

Jane Flory (1917–2005) was an American author and illustrator of children's books.

Flory née Trescott was born on June 29, 1917, in Wilkes-Barre, Pennsylvania. She graduated from Philadelphia Museum School of Industrial Art in 1939.

Her first children's book Snooty, the Pig Who Was Proud was published by Whitman Publishing in 1944. she went on to write over 30 books. Her last book was The Great Bamboozlement. It was published by Houghton Mifflin in 1982.

Flory was married twice; first to Arthur L. Flory, with whom she had three children, then to Barnett R. Freedman in 1980.

Flory died on November 25, 2005, in Philadelphia, Pennsylvania.

== Publications ==
=== Amanda Scoville books ===
- Peddler's Summer. Houghton Mifflin Company. 1960.
- Mist on the Mountain. Houghton Mifflin Company. 1966.

=== Standalone books (as author) ===
- Snooty, the Pig Who Was Proud. Whitman Publishing. 1944.
- The Wide Awake Angel. Grosset & Dunlap. 1945.
- The Cow in the Kitchen. Lothrop, Lee & Shepard. 1946.
- Fanny Forgot. Whitman Publishing. 1946.
- The Hide-Away Ducklings. Grosset & Dunlap. 1946.
- Once Upon a Windy Day. Whitman Publishing. 1947.
- Timothy, the Little Brown Bear. Rand McNally. 1949.
- Farmer John. Whitman Publishing. 1950.
- Mr. Snitzel's Cookies. Rand McNally & Company. 1950.
- The Too Little Fire Engine. Wonder Books. 1950.
- The Runaway Train. Avon Kiddie Books. 1951.
- Surprise in the Barn. Whitman Publishing. 1955.
- A Tune for the Towpath. Houghton Mifflin. 1962.
- One Hundred and Eight Bells. Houghton Mifflin. 1963.
- Clancy's Glorious Fourth. Houghton Mifflin. 1964.
- Faraway Dream. Houghton Mifflin. 1968.
- Ramshackle Roost. Illustrated by Carolyn Croll. Houghton Mifflin. 1972. ISBN 9780395137284.
- The Liberation of Clementine Tipton. Houghton Mifflin Harcourt. 1974. ISBN 9780395194935.
- We'll Have a Friend for Lunch. Illustrated by Carolyn Croll. Houghton Mifflin. 1974. ISBN 9780395184486.
- The Golden Venture. Houghton Mifflin Harcourt. 1976. ISBN 9780395243770.
- It Was a Pretty Good Year. Houghton Mifflin Harcourt. 1977. ISBN 9780395258354.
- The Unexpected Grandchildren. Houghton Mifflin Harcourt. 1977. ISBN 9780395257975.
- The Lost and Found Princess. Houghton Mifflin Harcourt. 1979. ISBN 9780395278086.
- The Bear on the Doorstep. Houghton Mifflin Harcourt. 1980. ISBN 9780395292396.
- Miss Plunkett to the Rescue. Illustrated by Blanche Sims. Houghton Mifflin Harcourt. 1983. ISBN 9780395330722.

=== Standalone books (as illustrator) ===
- Harris, Laura (1945). Away We Go. Garden City Publishing.
- Klaperman, Libby M. (1957). Jeremy's ABC Book. Behrman Hous.
