= Golden Guide =

Series of pocket-sized books

- Early Golden Guides, published from 1949 to 1955.
- Edited by: Herbert Zim, Vera Webster
- Original title: Golden Nature Guides
- Illustrator: James Gordon Irving
- Country: United States
- Language: English
- Publisher: Western Publishing; Golden Press; St. Martin's Press (2001–present)
- Published: 1949–2002
- Media type: Pocket book
- No. of books: 84
- Followed by: Golden Field Guide
- Website: Official website

The Golden Guides, originally Golden Nature Guides, were a series of 160-page, pocket-sized books created by Western Publishing and published under their "Golden Press" line (primarily a children's book imprint) from 1949. Edited by Herbert S. Zim and Vera Webster, the books were written by experts in their field and featuring realistic color illustrations.

Intended for primary and secondary school level readers, the first books were field guides illustrated by James Gordon Irving, with such titles as Birds (1949), Insects (1951), and Mammals (1955). The series later expanded beyond identification guides to cover a wider range of subjects, such as Geology (1972), Scuba Diving (1968), and Indian Arts (1970).

In 1966, Zim launched a related series, the Golden Field Guides, aimed at high school or college-age readers.

An updated series was relaunched in 2001 as "Golden Guides by St. Martin's Press", illustrated largely with photographs but retaining some of the original 1950s illustrations.

== List of Golden Guides ==
Title	Author(s)	Date Published
Acadia National Park	Grant Sharpe	1968
American Antique Glass	Elizabeth Oliver	1977
Antiques	Ann Cole	1967
Architecture	Charles Rambert	1969
Bats of the World	Gary Graham	1994
Bicycling	George Fichter & Keith Kingbay	1972
Bird Life	Stephen Kress	1991
Birds	Herbert Zim & Ira Gabrielson	1949
Birds of Europe	Bertel Bruun	1967
Botany	Taylor Alexander, R. Will Burnett, Zim	1970
Butterflies and Moths	Robert Mitchell & Herbert Zim	1962
Cacti	Frank Venning	1974
Camping	Robert Smallman	1965
Casino Games	Bill Friedman	1973
Cats	George Fichter	1973
Dinosaurs	Eugene Gaffney	1990
Ecology	Taylor Alexander & George Fichter	1973
Endangered Animals	George Fichter	1995
Everglades National Park	Herbert Zim	1960
Evolution	Frank T. Rhodes	1974
Exotic Plants	Julia Morton	1971
Exploring Space	Mark Chartrand	1991
Families of Birds	Oliver Austin	1971
Fishes	Herbert Zim & Hurst Shoemaker	1955
Fishing	George Fichter & Phil Francis	1965
Flowers	Herbert Zim & Alexander Martin	1950
Flying	Barry Schiff	1971
Fossils	Frank Rhodes, H. Zim & Paul Shaffer	1962
Gamebirds	Alexander Sprunt & Herbert Zim	1961
Geology	Frank Rhodes	1972
Guns	Larry Koller	1961
Hallucinogenic Plants	Richard Schultes	1976
Heart	Sarah Riedman	1974
Herbs and Spices	Julia Morton	1976
Horses	Moira Duggan	1972
Indian Arts	Andrew Whiteford	1970
Insect Pests	George Fichter	1966
Insects	Herbert Zim & Clarence Cottam	1951
Israel and the Holy Land	Rinna Samuel	1967
Italy	Paul Friedlander & Joseph Brooks	1955
Kites	Wyatt Brummit	1971
Landforms	George Adams & Jerome Wyckoff	1971
Light and Color	Clarence Rainwater	1971
Mammals	Herbert Zim & Donald Hoffmeister	1955
Mexico	Herbert Zim	1969
Modern Painting	Michel Hoog	1970
Non-Flowering Plants	Floyd Shuttleworth & Herbert Zim	1967
Oceanography	Gilbert Voss	1972
Orchids	Shuttleworth, Zim & Gordon Dillon	1970
Pacific Northwest	Herbert Zim & Natt Dodge	1959
Painting - From Its Origins	Genevieve Monnier	1969
Painting, Gasser's Guide to	Henry Gasser	1964
Photography	Herbert Zim & R. Will Burnett	1956
Planets	Mark Chartrand	1990
Pond Life	George Reid	1967
Power Boats	Bill Wallace	1961
Reptiles and Amphibians	Herbert Zim & Hobart Smith	1953
Rocks and Minerals	Herbert Zim & Paul Shaffer	1957
Rocky Mountains	Herbert Zim	1964
Sailing	Bill Wallace	1960
Scuba Diving	Wheeler North	1968
Sculpture, An Introduction to	Guillaume Janneau & Simone Hoog	1970
Seashells of the World	R. Tucker Abbott	1962
Seashores	Herbert Zim & Lester Ingle	1955
Ski	Bill Wallace & Bob Beattie	1966
Sky Observer's Guide	R. Newton, M. Mayall & Jerome Wyckoff	1965
Snakes	Sarah Whittley	2002
Southeast, The American	Herbert Zim	1960
Southwest, The American	Natt Dodge & Herbert Zim	1959
Spiders & Their Kin	Herbert Levi & Lorna Levi	1968
Sports Cars	Mortarini, Leopold & Waterfall	1968
Stars	Herbert Zim & Robert Baker	1951
Trees	Herbert Zim & A. Martin	1952
Tropical Fish	Bruce Halstead & Bonnie Landa	1975
Venomous Animals	Edmund Brodie, Jr.	1989
Washington D.C.	Robert Smallman	1964
Weather	Paul Lehr, R. Will Burnett & Herbert Zim	1957
Weeds	Alexander Martin	1972
Whales and Other Marine Mammals	George Fichter	1990
Wines	Henri Fluchère	1973
Yosemite	Douglass Hubbard	1970
Zoo Animals	Donald Hoffmeister	1967
Zoology	Will Burnett, Herbert Zim, & Harvey Fisher	1958
