= Vicki Barr =

Vicki Barr may refer to:

- Vicki Barr (athlete) (born 1982), British sprinter
- The lead character in the Vicki Barr (books) series
