= Cherry Ames =

Fictional character

- Cover of reprint of Cherry Ames, Student Nurse (1943), the first Cherry Ames book
- Author: Helen Wells (#1–7, 17–27); Julie Campbell Tatham (#8–16)
- Country: United States
- Language: English
- Genre: Mystery
- Publisher: Grosset & Dunlap; Springer Publishing (reprints, 2005–2007)
- Published: 1943–1968
- Media type: Print

Cherry Ames is the central character in a series of 27 mystery novels with hospital settings published by Grosset & Dunlap between 1943 and 1968. Helen Wells (1910-1986) wrote volumes #1–9 and #17–27, and Julie Campbell Tatham (1908–1999), the creator of Trixie Belden, wrote volumes #10–16. Wells also created the Vicki Barr series. During World War II, the series encouraged girls to become nurses as a way to aid the war effort. Cherry Ames original editions are prized by collectors and fans. The series generated a few spin-off items, including a Parker Brothers board game; some titles have been reprinted.

== Character ==
The series stars a job-hopping, mystery-solving nurse in the Nancy Drew mold, named Cherry Ames. Cherry (short for Charity) hails from Hilton, Illinois (based on Wells' hometown of Danville, Illinois), and was steered into nursing by Dr. Joseph Fortune, an old family friend. Cherry's training at the Spencer Hospital School of Nursing is chronicled in the first two books. There, she meets the classmates who become lifelong friends.

With the third book in the series Army Nurse, Cherry joins the Army Nurse Corps, and, after the war, she moves to Greenwich Village. Whenever Cherry isn't working with the Visiting Nurse Service, Dr. Joe sends her on assignments in various parts of the country. Unlike other nurses of girls' fiction, such as Sue Barton, Cherry remains unpartnered throughout her career, although an occasional beau will crop up, such as Dr. "Lex" Upham.

=== Evolution of character ===
Cherry's early adventures are set during World War II. In these early adventures, Cherry solves problems and captures criminals when men in authority have failed to do so, "demonstrating that women can succeed in the public, working world".

== Books ==
The books were written by Helen Wells and Julie Tatham and published in the United States by Grosset & Dunlap between 1943 and 1968. They were extensively printed in the United Kingdom in the 1950s and 1960s. The books are an example of the "girls' series" genre. Girls' series books follow a girl in her late teens or early twenties, usually with an interesting job, who goes on adventures either on her own or with a small group of friends. The genre was occasionally criticized for its formulaic plots and the poor construction of the books themselves. Beginning in 2005, the Cherry Ames series was licensed to the Springer Publishing Company and are currently being reprinted. In addition, a new edition of Cherry Ames, Student Nurse was released by the Palm Healthcare Foundation, Inc., through its Palm Publishing LLC subsidiary. Proceeds from the sale of the books were used to support nursing scholarships.

=== Titles ===
1. Cherry Ames, Student Nurse (1943)
2. Cherry Ames, Senior Nurse (1944)
3. Cherry Ames, Army Nurse (1944)
4. Cherry Ames, Chief Nurse (1944)
5. Cherry Ames, Flight Nurse (1945)
6. Cherry Ames, Veterans' Nurse (1946)
7. Cherry Ames, Private Duty Nurse (1946)
8. Cherry Ames, Visiting Nurse (1947)
9. Cherry Ames, Cruise Nurse (1948)
10. Cherry Ames, at Spencer (1949)
11. Cherry Ames, Night Supervisor (1950)
12. Cherry Ames, Mountaineer Nurse (1951)
13. Cherry Ames, Clinic Nurse (1952)
14. Cherry Ames, Dude Ranch Nurse (1953)
15. Cherry Ames, Rest Home Nurse (1954)
16. Cherry Ames, Country Doctor's Nurse (1955)
17. Cherry Ames, Boarding School Nurse (1955)
18. Cherry Ames, Department Store Nurse (1956)
19. Cherry Ames, Camp Nurse (1957)
20. Cherry Ames, at Hilton Hospital (1959)
21. Cherry Ames, Island Nurse (1960)
22. Cherry Ames, Rural Nurse (1961)
23. Cherry Ames, Staff Nurse (1962)
24. Cherry Ames, Companion Nurse (1964)
25. Cherry Ames, Jungle Nurse (1965)
26. Cherry Ames: The Mystery in the Doctor's Office (1966)
27. Cherry Ames: Ski Nurse Mystery (1968)

== General and cited references ==
- Abate, Michelle Ann (2008). Tomboys: A Literary and Cultural History. Temple University Press. ISBN 978-1-59213-723-7.
- Hallam, Julia (2000). Nursing the Image: Media, Culture, and Professional Identity. Routledge. ISBN 0-415-18455-X.
- Parry, Sally (1997). "'You Are Needed, Desperately Needed!': Cherry Ames in World War II". In Inness, Sherrie (ed.). Nancy Drew and Company: Culture, Gender, and Girls' Series. Bowling Green, OH: Bowling Green State University Popular Press. ISBN 0-87972-736-5.
- Pendergast, Tom and Sara (2000). "Cherry Ames". The St. James Encyclopedia of Popular Culture. Vol. 1. St. James Press. p. 491. ISBN 1558624007.
