= Meg Duncan =

Series of children's novels

Cover of first Meg Duncan mystery

The Meg Duncan books are a series of six juvenile mystery books originally published by Whitman Publishing between 1967 and 1972 and reprinted in 1978. They were written by Holly Beth Walker (a pseudonym) and illustrated by Cliff Schule. The series was developed by editor Dorothy Haas, and first printed under Western Publishing's hardback-imprint formats. They were later reprinted as paperbacks.

Margaret Ashley Duncan, a girl of unspecified age, solves mysteries with the help of her best friend, Kerry Carmody. Four of the books are set near Meg's hometown of Hidden Springs, Virginia, and two take place when Meg and Kerry travel with Meg's Uncle Hal.

== Characters ==
Margaret Ashley Duncan is Meg to most people, though Uncle Hal calls her Maggie-me-love. Her age is never given, but she is described as a girl, not an adolescent. She has brown eyes and long, dark brown hair in braids, but wishes she had short hair. Meg lives in the country, near the village of Hidden Springs, Virginia. She practices ballet and Uncle Hal is teaching her to paint. She is an only child, and her mother has died. Her Siamese cat, Thunder, partially makes up for not having a large family.

Mr. Duncan is Meg's father. He has an important government job in Washington DC and is often away from home. He calls home regularly, and he and Meg have a loving relationship.

Mr. and Mrs. Wilson are an older couple who live with the Duncans. Mrs. Wilson is the housekeeper and Mr. Wilson does the yard work and odd jobs.

Harold Ashley is Meg's Uncle Hal, her late mother's handsome younger brother. Uncle Hal works at a small museum in Washington DC. He drives an antique Duesenberg roadster, and flies his own plane. He has an apartment in Washington DC and a cabin in Maine.

Kerry Carmody is Meg's best friend. She lives on a farm near the Duncan home with her parents, five brothers, and one sister, and has a pony named Chappie. She has short blonde hair and blue eyes. She and her siblings call their parents "Ma'am" and "Sir".

Constable Hosey is the Hidden Springs law officer. Always on duty, he will arrive quickly, even if called in the middle of the night.

== Authors known and unknown ==
The first book, Meg and the Disappearing Diamonds, was written by Gladys Baker Bond, a prolific author of at least 35 books, most published by Western Publishing. Many of her Whitman books were Authorized Editions based on popular television series. Mrs. Baker wrote seven books under the pseudonym of Jo Mendel. She wrote three Trixie Belden books under the pseudonym of Kathryn Kenny. A 1981 volume of Contemporary Authors lists only one Meg book among Gladys Baker Bond's writings. It is not known who wrote the other five books, but several minor discrepancies hint that at least two other authors were involved:

In The Disappearing Diamonds, written by Mrs. Bond, Kerry has red-blonde hair. In four of the volumes she has blond hair, but her red-blonde hair returns in The Ghost of Hidden Springs.

In The Mystery of the Black-Magic Cave, Hidden Springs is a small city instead of a village, and Meg is said to have olive-tinted skin. The Treasure Nobody Saw is the only book where Constable Hosey is sometimes called Mr. Hosey. The Ghost of Hidden Springs is the only book where the Carmody children call their paternal parent Father, and not Sir.

In addition to these discrepancies, William Larson, a former Whitman editor, stated that if more than one book in a series was published in a year, they were almost always written by different people. Since two Meg Duncan books were published in both 1967 and 1970 it is probable that multiple authors, with different slants on details, wrote books two through six.

== Book formats ==
The Meg books were originally published from 1967 to 1972 under two of Western Publishing's hardback imprints.

A Whitman Mystery Meg books have illustrated board covers and no dust-jacket. The volumes measure 7 3/4 × 5 inches with an average length of 138 pages. Single-color illustrations are by Cliff Schule. The spine-numbered A Whitman Mystery books are in this order:

1. Meg and the Disappearing Diamonds (1967)
2. Meg and the Secret of the Witch's Stairway (1967)
3. Meg and the Mystery of the Black-Magic Cave (1971)
4. Meg and the Ghost of the Hidden Springs (1970)
5. Meg and the Treasure Nobody Saw (1970)
6. Meg and the Mystery in Williamsburg (1972)

A Whitman Tween Age Book Meg books have illustrated board covers and no dust jacket. The volumes measure 8 3/8 × 5 1/2 inches, with an average length of 156 pages. There is more space between lines of print. Illustrations by Cliff Schule have more shading and detail; some are a two-page spread in full color. These Tween Age Books are not numbered.

Western Publishing reprinted the series as paperbacks in 1978. The paperbacks went through enough editions for the price printed on the cover to go from 95¢ to $1.25.

Golden Press Meg paperbacks measure 7 3/8 × 4 7/8 inches, with an average length of 138 pages. The covers have a yellow background with new cover illustrations by Olindo Giacomini. Cliff Schule's illustrations are still used through the book. The illustrations are in one color, and are the line drawings used in A Whitman Mystery books. The spine and front cover-numbered Golden Press books are in this order:

1. Meg and the Disappearing Diamonds (1967, 1978)
2. Meg and the Secret of the Witch's Stairway (1967, 1978)
3. Meg and the Treasure Nobody Saw (1970, 1978)
4. Meg and the Ghost of the Hidden Springs (1970, 1978)
5. Meg and the Mystery of the Black-Magic Cave (1971, 1978)
6. Meg and the Mystery in Williamsburg (1972, 1978)

== Foreign editions ==
The books were also translated into Spanish and Portuguese. These foreign editions were hardback books with a white cover and the Olinda Giacomini cover illustrations used on the Golden Press paperbacks. The Cliff Schule illustrations were inside the books. The Spanish and Portuguese translations were published in 1978, the same year as the Golden Press paperbacks.

In 1979 Dutch translations were published in paperback format, using the Cliff Schule illustrations.
