= BITOI =

- Origin: Malmö, Sweden
- Genres: Experimental music, folk, electronic
- Years active: 2022–present
- Label: Supertraditional
- Members: Cassius Lambert – bass guitar; Alexandra Shabo – vocals; Lydia Cronberg – vocals; Ella Cronberg – vocals

BITOI (an acronym for Bass Is The Original Instrument) is an experimental music group formed in Sweden and Denmark in 2022. The ensemble combines electric bass with vocal music, drawing inspiration from birdsong and phonetic vocal techniques.

== Career ==
BITOI was founded by Swedish–Ethiopian electric bassist and composer Cassius Lambert, who composes the group's music and performs with a rotating trio of vocalists.The original vocal lineup consisted of Alexandra Shabo, Lise Kroner, and Anja Tietze Lahrmann. The group is based in Malmö and Copenhagen, and its music blends elements of experimental music, folk traditions, and electronic soundscapes.

The group made its live debut at the Intonal Festival in 2023, and has since performed at festivals including Le Guess Who?, Roskilde Festival, Clandestino Festival, Copenhagen Jazz Festival, and Passaggi Sonori in Italy. In 2024, BITOI toured Japan and collaborated with Okinawan musician Aragaki Mutsumi.

BITOI released its first EP, -O-, as a digital self-release in 2024. The debut album, Sirkulu, was issued in March 2025 on the Swedish label Supertraditional and received positive critical reception.

== Music and style ==
BITOI's music explores the interplay between the human voice and the electric bass. The group's vocal material is partly based on phonetic interpretations of birdsong, inspired by written transcriptions of bird vocalisations in Bertel Bruun’s book Alla Europas fåglar i färg. These transcriptions are used as non-lexical vocal material, with emphasis placed on sound rather than semantic meaning.

Performances incorporate techniques including throat drumming, whistling and wind-like vocal sounds.

Lambert describes the group's approach as “miximalism”: a method of working with a limited number of musical elements while expanding the expressive and sonic possibilities of each one. This concept is central to BITOI's use of bass, layered voices and extended vocal techniques, including throat drumming, whistling and wind-like sounds.

== Reception ==
BITOI has received coverage in Swedish and international music publications.Sydsvenskan wrote that the group “satisfies basic needs you did not know you had,” and described its music in terms of meditation, innovation, emotional engagement, vulnerability and strength. while Ystads Allehanda highlighted its connection to both Nordic and African sound worlds. In its review of Sirkulu, LIRA described BITOI as “a free-thinking and open musical project that impresses with its intimate and atmospheric expressions.”

International coverage has included Dansende Beren Written in Music, and Songlines. Writing in Songlines, Jo Frost described the group's sound as combining intertwining vocals, reverberating basslines and electronic effects, and compared its vocal approach to Yma Sumac and Värttinä. Crack Magazine described the group's performance at the Intonal Festival as “soul-cleansing,” while The Wire characterized their music as “a folkloristic soundscape that is as timeless as it is unfamiliar.”

== Discography ==
- -O- (EP, 2024, self-released)
- Sirkulu (Album, 2025, Supertraditional)

== Awards and nominations ==
- 2025 – Newcomer of the Year at the Folk & World Music Gala (Folk- och världsmusikgalan) – won
- 2025 – Årets Nye Danske Rootsnavn at Danish Music Awards Roots – won
- 2026 – Sirkulu – “Årets folkmusik” at the Grammis – nominated

== Members ==
BITOI performs with Lambert and a rotating lineup of three vocalists.

- Cassius Lambert – electric bass, composition

Rotating vocalists

- Alexandra Shabo – vocals
- Ella Cronberg – vocals
- Lydia Cronberg – vocals
- Anja Tietze Lahrmann – vocals
