= Western Publishing =

Firm responsible for publishing the Little Golden Books

Western Publishing Company
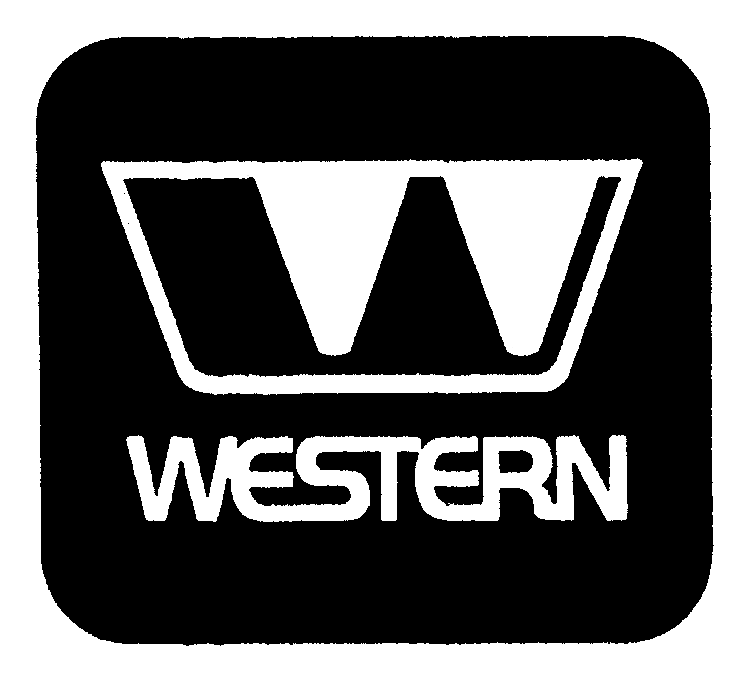
- Type: Public
- Industry: Publishing
- Genre: Children's and family entertainment
- Founded: 1907; 119 years ago in Racine, Wisconsin, U.S.
- Founders: Edward Henry Wadewitz; Albert H. Wadewitz
- Defunct: 2001; 25 years ago
- Fate: Folded into Golden Books Family Entertainment
- Successors: Random House; DreamWorks Classics
- Headquarters: 1220 Mound Avenue, Racine, Wisconsin, U.S.
- Number of locations: 3 (New York City, Los Angeles, Poughkeepsie, New York)
- Area served: United States
- Brands: Little Golden Books, Golden Guide, Golden Field Guide
- Subsidiaries: Whitman Publishing Company; Gold Key Comics; K.K. Publications

Western Publishing, also known as Western Printing and Lithographing Company, was an American company founded in 1907 in Racine, Wisconsin, best known for publishing the Little Golden Books. Its Golden Books Family Entertainment division also produced children's books and family-related entertainment products. The company had editorial offices in New York City and Los Angeles, California. Western Publishing became Golden Books Family Entertainment in 1996.

Golden Books Family Entertainment was eventually acquired jointly by Classic Media, owner of the catalog of United Productions of America (UPA), and book publisher Random House in a bankruptcy auction in 2001. Little Golden Books remains as an imprint of Penguin Random House. Golden Guides and Golden Field Guides are published by St. Martin's Press.

== History ==
=== Early years ===
Edward Henry Wadewitz, the 30-year-old son of German immigrants, worked at the West Side Printing Company in Racine, Wisconsin. When the owner of that company was unable to pay Wadewitz his wages, Wadewitz took the opportunity in 1907 to purchase the company for $2,504, with some of the funds provided by his brother Albert. Knowing that the company needed staff with more knowledge of the business than he had, Wadewitz hired Roy A. Spencer, a printer at the Racine Journal Company.

At the end of its first year sales were $5,000 and the company increased its staff of four to handle a growing number of commercial jobs. It installed a cylinder press, two smaller presses, and an automatic power cutter. In 1910, the company changed its name to Western Printing and Lithographing Company after the purchase of its first lithographic press. By 1914, sales were more than $127,000. The company installed a larger offset press and added electrotyping and engraving departments. Wadewitz was approached by the Hamming-Whitman Publishing Company of Chicago to print its line of children's books. Unable to pay its bills, Hamming-Whitman left Western with thousands of books. As a result, Western acquired Hamming-Whitman on February 9, 1916, and formed a subsidiary corporation, Whitman Publishing Company. It employed two salesmen and, in the first year, grossed more than $43,500 liquidating the remaining Hamming-Whitman books. In 1916, Sam Lowe joined Western. He convinced Western and Whitman to publish a 10-cent children's book in 1918 and convinced retailers that children's books could be sold year-round.

=== 1920s ===
Western introduced boxed games and jigsaw puzzles in 1923 after purchasing a 38-inch by 52-inch Potter offset press. By 1925, sales exceeded $1 million. Western added another subsidiary, the Western Playing Card Company after purchasing the Sheffer Playing Card Company. In 1929, Western purchased a Chicago stationery and greeting card manufacturer, Stationer's Engraving Company. Another subsidiary was K.K. Publications, named after Kay Kamen, manager of character merchandising at Walt Disney Studios from 1933 to 1949. K.K. Publications became defunct during the mid/late 1960s.

=== 1930s ===
During the Great Depression between 1929 and 1933, Western introduced new products: The Whitman jigsaw puzzle became very popular during this period as did a new series of books called Big Little Books. Brought out in 1932, the 10-cent Big Little Books became very popular with people looking for inexpensive entertainment. The first Big Little Book was The Adventures of Dick Tracy. Western won exclusive book rights to all Walt Disney licensed characters in 1933, and in 1934 established an eastern printing plant at the former Fiat factory site in Poughkeepsie, New York.

The printing plant allowed a close relationship to develop with the publishers Dell Publishing Company and Simon & Schuster, Inc. From 1938 to 1962 Dell Publishing and Western produced color comic books featuring many of Western's licensed characters. In 1938, the first joint effort between Western and Simon & Schuster, A Children's History, was published. In the 1930s, Western formed the Artists and Writers Guild Inc., located in New York City, to develop new children's books. Western expanded to the West Coast in the early 1940s, opening an office in Beverly Hills to make it easier to do business with studios that owned the characters the company licensed.

=== 1940s ===
Georges Duplaix replaced Sam Lowe as head of the Artists and Writers Guild in 1940 when Lowe left the company. Dick Simon, then head of Simon & Schuster, mentioned to Duplaix that he was interested in any new ideas for children's books. Duplaix had the idea to produce a colorful, more durable and affordable children's book than those being published at that time which sold for $2 to $3. With the help of Lucile Ogle, also working at the Guild, Duplaix contacted Albert Leventhal, a vice president and sales manager at Simon & Schuster, and Leon Shimkin, also at Simon & Schuster, with his idea. The group decided to publish twelve titles for simultaneous release in what was to be called the Little Golden Books Series. Each book would have forty-two pages, twenty-eight printed in two-color, and fourteen in four-color. The books would be staple-bound. The group originally discussed a 50-cent price for the books, but Western did not want to compete with other 50-cent books already on the market. The group calculated that if the print run for each title was 50,000 copies instead of 25,000, the books could be sold for 25 cents each. In September 1942, the first 12 titles were printed and released to stores in October. Three editions totaling 1.5 million books sold out within five months of publication in 1942.

During World War II, Western had a contract with the U.S. Army Map Service to produce maps for soldiers in the field and it also manufactured books and playing cards which were sent overseas. In 1945, Western acquired another major printing plant, Wolff Printing Company of St. Louis.

=== 1950s ===
Guild Press, Inc., a publisher of Catholic books, religious greeting cards, and gift wrap, was purchased in the early 1950s. In 1955, a new specialty printing plant was built in Hannibal, Missouri. Western achieved sales of $63 million in 1957, the year of its 50th anniversary. In the same year the company acquired Kable Printing Company, a large rotogravure magazine printer.

With partners Dell and Simon & Schuster, the company sponsored the Story Book Shop on Main Street, U.S.A., in Disneyland which opened on July 17, 1955, and closed April 1, 1995. In addition it was one of the initial investors in the park by virtue of being a part-owner of Disneyland, Inc.

Western and Pocket Books, Inc. formed Golden Press, Inc. at the end of 1958 following their joint purchase of all Golden Book properties from Simon and Schuster. The arrangement called for Western to continue to create and manufacture Golden Books which Pocket Books would promote, sell, and distribute. By 1959, over 150 Little Golden Book titles had sold at least a million copies, and more than 400 of the 1,000-plus Golden Book titles were in print in thirteen languages.

=== 1960s ===
The 16-volume Golden Book Encyclopedia, published in 1960, enjoyed sales of 60 million copies in two years, while sales of Golden Press books reached almost $39 million in 1960. In the same year, the name Western Publishing Company was adopted and common stock was issued with some eighty percent owned by management or employees. At this point Western had the distinction of being the largest creator and publisher of children's books, the largest producer/distributor of children's games made from paper or paper products, and the largest creator/producer of comic books. Western had operated at a profit every year since 1907, paid a dividend every year since 1934, and seen net sales increase from $40.5 million in 1950 to $123.8 million in 1960. During the same period, net profit had increased from $3.1 million to $7.4 million. In 1961, Western opened another printing plant, in Cambridge, Maryland, and in 1970 acquired several companies, including Odyssey Press, a high school and college textbook publisher.

By 1963, 65 percent of Western's total revenues derived from juvenile literature (including games), 25 percent from commercial printing, and 10 percent from books produced for other publishers and miscellaneous activities. Whitman accounted for 35 percent of the company's revenue. The company's half-share in Golden Press, Inc. was a problem. It lost money in 1961 and 1962, and, in 1963, its sales sagged from $32.9 million the previous year to $22.5 million. Western bought Pocket Books' half-share in Golden Press in 1964 with 276,750 shares of its common stock valued at nearly $7.4 million. Odyssey took over the sales and distribution of adult Golden Books; Western did the same for children's titles.

Western Printing & Lithographing, the largest company unit, accounted for about 40 percent of sales in 1965. Artists & Writers Press, Inc., one of fourteen active subsidiaries, created books for publishers and commercial customers including Golden Books, Betty Crocker cookbooks, the Arts of Mankind series for Golden Press, and the four-volume Harper Encyclopedia of Science for Harper & Row. Capitol Publishing, purchased in 1961, originated and produced educational materials and games for children, as well as toys and novelty products. The Kable Printing division produced over 125,000 monthly magazines, other periodicals, and catalogs. The Watkins-Strathmore Co., acquired in 1957, produced children's books and games, including Magic Slate. Meanwhile, Whitman published nearly every type of juvenile and adolescent books, numismatic books, coin cards, a wide variety of games, playing cards, crayons, and gift wrap. Western also had a Canadian subsidiary (established in 1959) and a French company (established in 1960).

In 1967, the Justice Department charged Golden Press and seventeen other publishers with illegally fixing prices of library editions of children's books. Each agreed to the terms of a consent judgment forbidding them from submitting rigged bids or conspiring with wholesalers to fix prices of sales to schools, libraries, or government agencies. Western purchased Skil-Craft Playthings, Inc., a leader in craft kits and a manufacturer of laboratory science sets for children based in Chicago, for 100,000 shares of common stock in 1968.

=== 1970s ===
In 1970, Western's sales reached $171.5 million but net profit fell to $3.9 million caused by the acquisition of a computerized typesetting facility and an eleven-week strike. As a result, the Hannibal plant was closed and the number of employees was reduced by 1,500 in mid-1974. Profits rose that year to $10.1 million; sales topped $215 million. In 1971, Western entered into an agreement with the Children's Television Workshop to produce Golden Books featuring the Muppets of Sesame Street. In 1974, Dell Publishing Company signed a ten-year printing contract with Western worth more than $50 million. That same year construction began on a distribution and game-and-puzzle assembly center in Fayetteville, North Carolina.

Direct marketing accounted for twenty-five percent of Western's consumer product sales by 1976. This represented seventy percent of total sales. Driven by products such as the Betty Crocker Recipe Card Program, a monthly mailing of recipe cards to millions of customers, sales grew to $237.3 million in 1976 with net income of $10.8 million. In 1979, Western ceased to be an independent company when Mattel Inc. purchased the company for $120.8 million in a cash/stock deal.

By the late 1970s, Western was one of the largest commercial printers in the United States. It had four manufacturing plants and two distribution centers between Kansas and Maryland. It boasted of installing some of the first heatset web offset printing presses in the US. As well, Western had the largest offset, sheet-fed presses, some exceeding 78 inches wide, printing in five colors, and one of the largest bindery operations in the United States. Among other things, it printed mass-market paperback books under contract, and was the primary manufacturer and distributor of the board game Trivial Pursuit, as well as other tabletop games. It developed and printed specialty cookbooks, premiums, and material for many Fortune 500 clients. At one time, Western printed almost everything from "business cards to billboards", and employed over 2500 full-time employees.

=== 1980s ===
The year 1980 saw the launch of the Sesame Street Book Club and the relocation of the Skil-Craft manufacturing plant from Chicago to Fayetteville. Sales climbed to $278 million in 1981. Mattel's investment in Western soon soured. In fiscal 1983 (ending January 31, 1983) Western had sales of $246 million with an operating loss of $2.4 million after a $7.5 million charge relating to closing the Poughkeepsie printing plant. Mattel had its own financial issues and, strapped for cash, sold Western in December 1983 to Richard A. Bernstein, a New York City real estate investor, for $75 million plus the assumption of certain liabilities later thought to be $40 million. Bernstein reincorporated the firm as the Western Publishing Group; Western Publishing Co., now a subsidiary, continued to be based in Racine.

Bernstein oversaw the introduction of eight videocassettes that featured Golden Books characters in 1985. A total of 2.5 million were shipped. Western developed and produced games under license for Tonka and Hasbro, and developed storybooks containing company logos as promotional items; Bernstein referred to this as "sponsored publishing". In 1986, Penn Corporation, which produced party paper and advertising specialities, was purchased for $108 million.

Bernstein took Western public in April 1986 and made more than $70 million on his original $5 million investment; he retained twenty-one percent of the stock. The company continued to prosper. For the fiscal year ending January 31, 1989, sales were $551 million produced earnings of nearly $30 million.

=== 1990s ===
In 1990, sales dropped to $508 million and earnings fell to $23 million. Analysts attributed some of this decline to falling sales of Pictionary, a popular Western board game introduced in 1985. Sales fell from $118 million to $42 million. In fiscal 1991 (ending January 31, 1991) sales had declined to $491 million with earnings of only $8 million. By late 1991, Western's share price had dropped to $9 from a high of $28.

In 1992, Western celebrated the 50th anniversary of the introduction of Little Golden Books publishing a boxed set of the twelve original titles for $19.95. Special editions of all-time favorites, and new books by popular artists and illustrators of children's books were also published to mark the occasion. The Golden Little Nugget Book line was introduced and sold more than 1.9 million units in six months. Golden management decided to publish trade books for children for the first time in 1993. These titles were published under the imprint Artists and Writers Guild Books and sold in general book and toy stores.

Western's net sales recovered in fiscal 1992 to $552.4 million with net income of $13.7 million, and $649.1 million with $17.5 million net income in 1993. In 1993, Western decided to close the advertising specialty division and took a $21.8 million writedown. A further $10 million was spent setting up and running bookstores in Toys "R" Us stores; the company decided ultimately to run the departments itself. Bernstein wanted to sell Western's products in discount stores and supermarket and drugstore chains and spent $20 million to do so. The school book club, started in 1990, also lost money. The net effect was a $55.8 million loss on sales of $613.5 million for fiscal 1994 (ending January 1994).

Three Golden Books Showcase Store locations were opened, which featured only Western Publishing products. The first was opened in the Woodfield Mall in Schaumburg, Illinois, in November 1992; the second in CityWalk Center outside Universal Studios Hollywood during June 1993; and the third store was opened in Rockefeller Center in New York City during April 1994. They have all since closed. By the mid-1990s, most of its printing plants were closed and its print operations consolidated in Racine.

These losses raised Western's debt to $250 million; its negative cash flow caused its bonds to be downgraded to junk status. Unable to sell the company, Bernstein began a major restructuring of Western. Hasbro Inc. purchased the games and puzzles division for $105 million and the Fayetteville distribution center which handled them was put up for sale. Troll purchased the school book club division for $4.3 million. Ritepoint and Adtrend, parts of Penn Corporation's advertising specialty division, were sold as was its direct-marketing continuity-club business. Staff was reduced by 28 percent. Bernstein continued the concept of developing book sections within stores and introduced 100 Just For Kids sections in Walmart locations which sold video and music along with books.

Western lost $11.6 million on revenues of $303.9 million during the first three quarters of 1994. Its common stock, which had traded as high as $21 a share in 1993, had fallen to below $10 in April 1995. No dividend had been paid since the company had been acquired by Bernstein from Mattel in 1984. At this point he owned or controlled nearly 20 percent of the common stock, the Gabelli Group held about 17 percent, and Prudential Insurance Company of America owned 8.6 percent. Long-term debt was $249.8 million.

By mid-1996, under the supervision of ex-Simon & Schuster executive Richard E. Snyder, it was renamed Golden Books Family Entertainment and focused on publishing children's books. Bernstein resigned all his positions at the company but retained his stock. It sold the adult books (Golden Guide) to St. Martin's Press in 1999.

=== 2000s ===
In June 2001, DIC Entertainment announced they would purchase Golden Books Family Entertainment for $170 million and send them out of bankruptcy. However, DIC would pass off the purchase due to high costs and instead Golden Books Family Entertainment was eventually acquired jointly by Classic Media, owner of the catalog of United Productions of America (UPA), and book publisher Random House in a bankruptcy auction for the $84.4 million on August 16, 2001. In turn, Random House, and Classic Media gained ownership of Golden Books' entertainment catalog (including the family entertainment catalog of Broadway Video which includes the pre-1974 library of Rankin/Bass Productions and the library of Total Television) as well as production, licensing and merchandising rights for Golden Books' characters and the Gold Key Comics and Dell Comics catalogs, while Random House gained Golden Books' book publishing properties.

The H. E. Harris stamp and coin company bought Whitman Coin Products from St. Martin's Press in 2003 and renamed it Whitman Publishing.

On July 23, 2012, Classic Media was acquired by DreamWorks Animation for $155 million and renamed DreamWorks Classics. On July 1, 2013, Random House merged with the Penguin Group, forming a new company called Penguin Random House. In April 2016, the acquisition of DreamWorks Animation (owner of DreamWorks Classics) by NBCUniversal was announced.

Historian Michael Barrier has lamented the apparent loss of Western's business records for future use by researchers.

== Divisions ==
=== Comic books ===
With licenses for characters from Walt Disney Productions, Warner Bros., Metro-Goldwyn-Mayer, Edgar Rice Burroughs and Walter Lantz Studio, Western produced comics based on these characters, as well as original works. The editorial staff at the West Coast office over the years included: Eleanor Packer, Alice Cobb, Chase Craig, Zetta Devoe, Del Connell and Bill Spicer. Bernie Zuber was an editorial artist, a position similar to that of a production artist, from 1957 until 1982. Oskar Lebeck, Matt Murphy and Wally Green are among those who oversaw the East Coast office.

From 1938 to 1962, Western's properties were published under a partnership with Dell Comics, which also handled the distribution and financing of the comic books. In 1962, Western ended this partnership and published comics itself, establishing the imprint Gold Key Comics. As Murphy explained the split:

With regard to a Western-Dell separation, this was by mutual agreement so that each company would be free to explore the potential business in the comics market without the self-imposed restrictions which formerly required Western and Dell to work exclusively with one another. In our previous relationship, Western Publishing Co. secured the rights, created the comics, printed them and shipped them out for Dell. Dell acted as the publisher and distributor and did the billing and paid Western for its creatively manufactured products.

This imprint continued until the late 1970s, after which newsstand distribution was discontinued in favor of distribution to toy stores under the "Whitman Comics" banner. The company stopped publishing comics in 1984, and all of its licenses have since gone to other publishers. Many of these new licensees have included among their offerings reprints of stories originally published by Western.

Prior to 1962, in addition to comics published through Dell, Western published some comics under its own name, particularly giveaways such as March of Comics and the annual kite safety title (which featured an array of licensed characters) published over a span of 32 years for power utility companies. Both series had print runs in the hundreds of thousands.

In the 1990s, the Western/Gold Key characters Magnus, Turok and Dr. Solar were licensed to Valiant Comics, who published modified versions of the characters to great success. However, by the mid-1990s, Valiant's sales had slumped due to the decade's speculative boom collapsing, and the company ceased publishing in 1999.

In 2004, Dark Horse Comics began reprinting some of Western's original comic book properties, which by then were owned by Random House, along with Tarzan from the Jesse Marsh era. In 2009, the company announced plans to launch new versions of various Gold Key characters, with former Valiant editor-in-chief Jim Shooter as head writer.

=== Children's books ===
Uncle Don's Strange Adventures, a 1936 Big Little Book, featured a story about radio host Uncle Don and his adventures with a mystery cruiser.

Beginning in the 1920s and 1930s, Western published a wide range of children's books (puzzle books, coloring books, Tell-a-Tale books, Big Little Books), mostly under the Golden Books and Whitman Publishing brand names. The Little Golden Books was a very popular series. Lucille Ogle helped develop the format for these low-priced books, which told simple stories and were among the first children's books with full-color illustrations. The first was published in 1942. Beginning as the "Whitman Famous Classics", and later renamed the "Golden Press" imprint, Western published a series of (public domain) classics, such as Little Women, Little Men, Black Beauty and Heidi.

In the late 1960s, Golden Books were bound in the Goldencraft reinforced library bindings and sold to schools and libraries in the United States by a group of independent sales representatives. The library bound books were very popular with the schools and libraries. Offices were set up in Wayne, New Jersey, and the reinforced library books were warehoused in Wayne and distributed from that location. There were about 80 sales representatives in the United States under the general manager, Roy Spahr.

=== Older children's literature ===
From the 1940s to the 1980s, Western published several series of books for older children and young teenagers, initially under its Whitman line. Girls' mystery series included Trixie Belden, Ginny Gordon, Donna Parker, Meg Duncan and Trudy Phillips. Boys' series included the Walton Boys, Power Boys, Brains Benton, and Troy Nesbit mysteries. The series, published from the 1950s to the 1970s, also included a number of titles licensed from popular movies and television shows: Lassie, The Adventures of Rin Tin Tin, many television Westerns, and Walt Disney's Spin and Marty and Annette (from the serial featuring Annette Funicello that aired on The Mickey Mouse Club. The company was also the original American publisher of The Adventures of Tintin, issuing six titles in English translation in 1959 and 1960, before discontinuing further releases because of what were considered disappointing sales.

=== Magazines ===
In 1937, Western, at the request of Kay Kamen (who oversaw licensing and marketing at Disney), assumed production of the newsstand version of Mickey Mouse Magazine, which, in October 1940, was succeeded by the comic book Walt Disney's Comics and Stories. 1936-1954 Story Parade, Inc. (a Western subsidiary) published Story Parade: A Magazine for Boys and Girls with a children's literature orientation. Then in late 1955, Western initiated Walt Disney's Mickey Mouse Club Magazine with content produced by Disney Studio staff members. It was intended to promote The Mickey Mouse Club television series. Eventually the name was changed to Walt Disney's Magazine and the focus shifted to contemporary Disney movie and television productions. In a similar vein, they printed Gulf Oil's Wonderful World of Disney premium (1969-1970) which was edited by Disney's George Sherman. During the 1960s, Western published The Golden Magazine for Boys and Girls with Cracky the Parrot as its mascot.

=== Miscellaneous ===
For many years Golden Press was publisher of Betty Crocker cookbooks. Often these were issued in a three-ring binder format so recipe pages could be removed for easy consultation while cooking. Western produced games such as Trivial Pursuit and Pictionary until Hasbro bought that division in 1994. The company published the children's science books The World of Science and The Golden Book of Chemistry Experiments, while the Golden Guide nature guides were published with the Golden Press name.
