= Renée Canavaggia =

French astrophysicist (1902–1996)

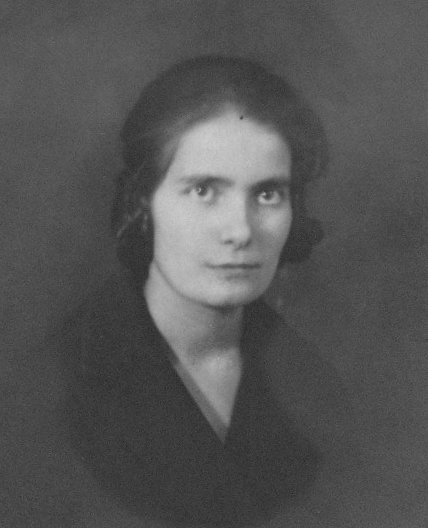
Renée Canavaggia

Renée Canavaggia (9 May 1902 - 1996), was a French astrophysicist and translator.

== Early life and family ==
Canavaggia was born in Castelsarrasin, France, to Louise Patry of Limoges and Jerome Canavaggia, a Corsican magistrate. She was the youngest of three daughters; her older sisters were Marie (who became a professional translator and literary secretary to Louis-Ferdinand Céline) and Jeanne (a noted abstract painter). She studied philosophy at the University of Montpellier and then went to Paris with her sister Marie, staying in a flat at the Square de Port-Royal for a number of years. She then oriented her studies towards mathematics.

== Career ==
In early 1930 she became a trainee at the Observatoire de Paris. Amongst other partnerships, she worked with astronomer and mathematician Henri Mineur on numerical methods and with astronomers Daniel Barbier and Daniel Chalonge on stellar classification. Between 1936 and 1940, she was works director at the office of stellar statistics of fr:l'Institut d'astrophysique de Paris of Paris (later to be part of the Centre national de la recherche scientifique) of which Chalonge was a founder member. From 1943 to 1945, she worked on the project to produce a celestial map of the entire sky.

She was a secretary then an organising committee member of the International Astronomical Union.

== Bibliography of translated and edited works ==
- Guide for creating scenery and machines for the theatre by Nicola Sabbattini. Translation by Marie and Renée Canavaggia and Louis Jouvet. Introduction by Louis Jouvet (1942-1977 Editions Ides et Calendes)
- Astronomy for boys and girls by Rose W. Wyler and G. Ames. Translated from the English by Renée Canavaggia. Preface by André Danjon. Illustrations by J. Polgreen (1956 Editions Cocorico)
- Astronomy for boys and girls by Rose W. Wyler and G. Ames. Translated from the English by Renée Canavaggia. Illustrations by J. Polgreen (1959 1963 1971 Editions des Deux cocks d'or)
- "Céline at work". Proofreading and correction of an extract of "Nord" by the author in 1960. Unpublished sound recording, directed by Renée Canavaggia. Published as a DVD in 'The great interviews of Louis-Ferdinand Céline'
- Stars: from H. S. Zim and R. H. Baker, with the collaboration of R. Renée Canavaggia. Illustrations by J.-G. Irving. Translated from English by Renée Canavaggia (1961 Éditions des Deux cocks d'or)
- Stars: Guide to the constellations, the sun, the moon, the planets and all the other elements of the celestial world Herbert S. Zim and Robert H. Baker. Illustrated by James Gordon Irving. French adaptation by R. Renée Canavaggia and J. Jacques Regnault (1963)
- Stars (The Little Guide) by H. S. Zim and R. H. Baker, Renée Canavaggia, and Jacques Regnault (1973, 1977 Editions Hachette).

== Scientific publications ==
- Ephemerides of Pluto and position of the neighbouring stars from August 15 to November 19, 1930 (1930)
- Theory of the emission of light from nebulae (with Herman Zanstra). Translated from the English by Renée Canavaggia (1936)
- Study of the continuous spectrum of some stars between 3100 and 4600 angstroms. (1936)
- Variation in the distribution of energy in the α Gem spectrum, Balmer discontinuity of α UMi (1947)
- Study of the continuous radiation of a few stars between 3100 and 4600 angstroms -V: new measurements of D and Gamma (with Daniel Barbier) (1947)
- On the variation of the electronic pressure and the gravity of α Cephei with the phase (1948)
- Thesis presented at the Faculty of Sciences of the University of Paris to obtain the degree of Doctor of Physical Sciences: Variation of the Balmer discontinuity at Delta Cephei, Aquilae and Zeta Geminorum (1949)
- On a method of studying the absorbing properties of stellar atmospheres (with Daniel Chalonge and Vladimir Kurganoff) (1949)
- The spectrum of Nova Scuti (with Vladimir Kurganoff and G. Munch) (1949)
- Occultations observed at Renée Canavaggia's Paris Observatory (1949)
- The Balmer Discontinuity of HD 190 073 (with Jacques Bergerand and Daniel Chalonge) (1950)
- Spectrophotometric study of some sub-dwarves (with Jacques Berger, Daniel Chalonge and Anne-Marie Fringant) (1951)
- Study of the continuous radiation of some stars between 3100 and 4600 angstroms. (with Daniel Barbier and Daniel Chalonge) (1951)
- The Balmer Discontinuity of some stars with extended atmospheres (with Jacques Berger, Daniel Chalonge and Anne-Marie Fringant) (1951)
- Research on the continuous spectrum of the Sun II. (with Daniel Chalonge) (1951)
- Variation of the Balmer discontinuity in α Cephei, α Aquilae, α Geminorum (1951)
- Research on the continuous spectrum of the Sun III. Continuous spectrum of the center of the disc between 3200 and 5000 angstroms (with Hélène Oziol-Peltey, Daniel Chalonge and Madeleine Egger-Moreau) (1951)
- Variation of the effective temperature and radius of a Cepheid (with Jean-Claude Pecker) (1952)
- The Yellow Giants: I. Models of atmospheres (with Jean-Claude Pecker) (1953)
- The Yellow Giants: II. Continuous spectra (with Jean-Claude Pecker) (1953)
- Cepheids: relative reddening given by photometry in six colors; verification of light variations (1955)
- Contributions: From the Institute of Astrophysics of Paris. Series B by Renée Canavaggia and Institute of Astrophysics of Paris. (1955)
- On the radiation of Cepheids (with Jean-Claude Pecker) (1955)
- The Cepheids (1957)
- The Cepheids: The time lag between luminosity extremes and the variation of light (with Jean-Claude Pecker) (1957)
- Effect of interstellar absorption on heterochromatic magnitudes: qualitative interpretation (1959)
- Cepheids and RR Lyraes, distance indicators (1964)
- Observations in six colors of stars of classification f, g and k analyzed from the point of view of the effects of interstellar reddening and chemical composition (1966)
- Photometric criteria of stellar population, using photometry from Lick Observatory (1967)
- Cepheids - a discussion (with P. Mianes and J. Rousseau) (1975)
- Cepheids (with P. Mianes and J. Rousseau) (1976)
- Dual aspect of the wavelength-dependent fluctuation of epsilon Aurigae (1980)
