= Marie Canavaggia =

French translator (1896–1976)

Marie Canavaggia (March 1896 – September 30, 1976) was a professional French translator and, for 25 years, the literary secretary of the writer and pamphleteer Louis-Ferdinand Céline.

== Early life and family ==
Canavaggia was born in Limoges, France, to Louise Patry of Limoges and Jerome Canavaggia, a Corsican magistrate. She was the oldest of three daughters; her younger sisters were Jeanne (who became noted abstract painter) and Renée (who worked as a translator – sometimes with Marie – and became an astrophysicist). Her childhood was spent between Limoges and Castelsarrasin, depending on where her father was working, so she attended school intermittently.

In 1911 or 1912, the family settled permanently in Nîmes, where Canavaggia finished her studies at the local girls' high school. Her classmate there, Jeanne Carayon, became Celine's first literary secretary. Inspired to read her favorite authors in their native language, Marie chose to study English and Italian and found a liking for translation. She gained a bachelor's degree and after the war, she visited England and Italy.

== Career ==
Returning to Nîmes, she translated Born in Exile by George Gissing, finishing in late 1929 or early 1930, then seeking an editor for the book. But her first published translation was The Weary Mason, a short story by Arturo Lorja, which appeared in the magazine Europe in April 1931.

In 1932 she joined her sister Renée in Paris. Both single, they took a flat together at the Square de Port-Royal. The translation of Born in Exile appeared that year, published by Les Éditions du Siècle. Marie retained an unusual and lifelong attitude as a translator: instead of working to order, she chose a work that interested her, translated it, then tried to convince publishers of the value of it for the French public. She had a predilection for fantastical works. She went on to publish 14 translations of authors from Italian, and 38 from English. According to Julie Arsenault, her choices reveal a notable taste, for example Nathaniel Hawthorne's The Scarlet Letter and The House of the Seven Gables, and authors such as Mario Soldati, Guido Piovene, Thomas Hardy, George Eliot, Evelyn Waugh, Mary Webb and John Cowper Powys. Arsenault described her as "one of the few prominent translators of major works of American and English literature in the 20th century. Her role and influence in France and in French-speaking countries gave French readers the opportunity to discover key texts of English-language literatures."

== Collaboration with Louis-Ferdinand Céline ==
In 1932, Céline did not want to read again the drafts of his novel Journey to the End of the Night; his secretary, Jeanne Carayon, read them instead. Four years later, she was not able to proof read Death on Credit because she was in the U.S.A. She recommended her high-school friend, Canavaggia.

Canavaggia's first role was finalise the manuscript. She received a first version of the text, addressed remarks to Céline, questioning the twists, audacious grammar and neologisms: "If he decided to change a word," she said, "He did not just replace it with another one. He completely recomposed the sentence, sometimes also the surrounding sentences, according to the requirements of his 'pace'". Céline's corrections were countless: "There are no small details that can weary me!" he wrote to Canavaggia. "I want them all! The least comma fascinates me." Canavaggia entrusted a typist with successive versions of the text, which she controlled. Then she corrected the printing proofs.

Canavaggia became a crucial link between Céline and France during his years of exile in Denmark. She was trusted to negotiate with publishers instead of the author. They exchanged about 400 letters in the period 1945–1951.

In 1945, she met the painter Jean Dubuffet, a great admirer of Céline (who was then in exile in Denmark after his vocal support of the Axis powers). She introduced him to her sister Jeanne, herself a painter. In 1948, Dubuffet asked Marie to translate articles published in the American press during his first exhibition in New York. Thus began a collaboration that lasted until the early 1970s.

Pierre Monnier described Marie Canavaggia as having the "typical character of a provincial aristocrat, a little 'Lady in a green hat', ardent and reserved." For Céline, this rigorous and precise woman was able to understand intimately his literary and stylistic requirements, which a "house" proof reader would not have been able to do. "There is no exegete," said Monnier, "not a critic who, like her, has felt like she has, with so much intelligence and sensitivity, the rhythm and weight of the Célinian sentence." Céline imposed Canavaggia on all his publishers, casual or not. He became furious in 1949 when he learned that the drafts of Journey at the End of the Night were entrusted to a house proof reader: "I've been made aware by Marie of this sabotage of commas and I am revolted, outraged, quivering." In 1952, he warned the publisher, Gallimard: "But I must keep Marie Canavaggia. I absolutely want it! She is part of the work. In 1961, shortly before his death, when he struggled to get his work in the Bibliothèque de la Pléiade, he reminded Gallimard: "A proof reader, it goes without saying, can't be more qualified than Marie Canavaggia."

Canavaggia was "secretary and confidante" to Céline, according to Roger Nimier. She was for Celine his "dear double", and a soul mate rather than a woman. According to Henri Godard, without "going as far as hoping that nothing intimate could intervene between them", Canavaggia would probably have liked to be the only woman in Celine's life. She was jealous of his wife, Lucette. She remained his secretary and close collaborator until his death on July 1, 1961. As of that date, she no longer had access to the manuscripts and played no role in the development of posthumous texts, in particular that of Rigodon, which was transcribed by André Damien, then by François Gibault and Lucette Destouches, and finally by Henri Godard during inclusion in la Pléiade.

She died aged 80 after being knocked down by a car in Paris.

The correspondence of Marie Canavaggia and Céline was published by Lérot, then by Gallimard. The manuscripts were given by her sister Renée to the Bibliothèque nationale de France.

== Translated works ==
From English literature

- Compton Mackenzie, Carnaval, coll. Les Grands Étrangers, Paris, Redier. (1932)
- George Gissing, Né en exil, introd. Émile Henriot, coll. Les Maîtres étrangers, Paris, Siècle. (1932)
- Thomas Hardy, Le Retour au pays natal, introd. Léon Daudet, coll. Les Maîtres étrangers, Siècle. (1932)
- Mary Webb, La Renarde, introd. Jacques de Lacretelle, coll. Les Maîtres étrangers, Siècle. (with Jacques de Lacretelle)(1933)
- Richard Aldington, La Fille du colonel, Paris, Gallimard. (1935)
- Patrick Quentin, Terreur dans la vallée, coll. Le Masque, Paris, Champs-Élysées. (1935)
- Evelyn Waugh, Diablerie, préface Jean Giraudoux, coll. Romans étrangers, Paris, Grasset. (1938)
- Virginia Rath, La Folie sous la neige, Paris, Simon. (1938)
- Tancred Borenius, La Peinture anglaise au XVIIIe siècle, Paris, Hypérion. (1938)
- Patrick Quentin, La Mort fait l'appel, coll. L'Empreinte, no 160, Nouvelle Revue Critique. (1939)
- Mary Webb, Vigilante Armure, coll. Les Maîtres étrangers, Paris, Nouvelles Éditions latines. (1940)
- Nathaniel Hawthorne, La Maison aux sept pignons, coll. Les Maîtres étrangers, Nouvelles Éditions latines. (1945)
- Evelyn Waugh, Une poignée de cendre, coll. Romans étrangers, Grasset.
- Lord Berners, Le Nez de Cléopâtre, coll. Fenêtre sur le monde, Paris, La Jeune Parque. (1945)
- Dorothy Cameron Disney, Le Crime du cygne d'or, coll. Le Sphinx, Paris, Maréchal. (1945)
- Nathaniel Hawthorne, La Catastrophe de Mr. Higginbotham et Le Jeune Maître Brown, in coll. Contes étranges, première série (novels of William Wilkie Collins, Nathaniel Hawthorne, Charles Dickens, R. H. Barham and Walter Scott), Paris, Les Ordres de chevalerie. (1945)
- Max Long, Meurtre entre chien et loup, coll. Le Sphinx Maréchal. (1946)
- Elda Benjamin, Un cadavre bien né, coll. Le Sphinx, Maréchal. (1946)
- Nathaniel Hawthorne, La Lettre écarlate, avant-propos Julien Green, coll. Vieille Amérique, La Nouvelle Édition. (1946)
- Howard Spring, Des faits précis, Paris, Flammarion. (1947)
- Allen Tate, Les Ancêtres, Gallimard. (1948)
- Anne Green, Mes jours évanouis, Paris, Plon. (1951)
- Evelyn Waugh, Hélène, Paris, Stock. (1951)
- Nathaniel Hawthorne, Valjoie préface André Maurois, Gallimard. (1952)
- Henry James, Les Amis des amis, Paris, Arcanes. (1953)
- Rebecca West, Vallauris, mil neuf cent cinquante-quatre : suite de 180 dessins de Picasso, Paris, éd. de la revue Verve. (1954)
- Rebecca West, Carnets intimes de G. Braque, éd. de la revue Verve. (1955)
- Elizabeth Montagu, L'Univers de Miss Sotherby, coll. Climats, Grasset. (1956)
- Henry James, L'Image dans le tapis, coll. Eaux vives, Paris, Horay. (1957)
- James Fitzsimmons, Jean Dubuffet. Brève introduction à son œuvre, Album Jean Dubuffet, Bruxelles, La Connaissance. (1958)
- John Cowper Powys, Les Sables de la mer, Paris, Plon. (1958)
- Theodore Powys, De vie à trépas, Gallimard. (1961)
- James Purdy, Malcom, Gallimard. (1961)
- John Cowper Powys, Autobiographie, Gallimard. (1965)
- John Cowper Powys, Camp retranché, Grasset. (1967)
- George Eliot, Le Voile soulevé, Paris, Revue de Paris, February and March. (1968)
- John Cowper Powys, Thomas Hardy, in Granit, nos. 1–224. (1973)
- John Cowper Powys, Les Sables de la mer, Bourgois. (1982)

From Italian literature

- Arturo Lorja, Le Maçon fatigué, in Europe, no 100. (15 April 1931)
- Bruno Biagi, L'État corporatif, Nouvelles Éditions latines. (1935)
- Gian Dàuli, La Roue, Stock. (1939)
- Raphaël Sabatini, Le Boucanier du roi, Gallimard. (with Pierre Dutray)(1940)
- Nicola Sabbattini, Pratique pour fabriquer scènes et machines de théâtre, introd. Louis Jouvet, Neuchâtel, Ides et Calendes. (with Renée Canavaggia et Louis Jouvet)(1942)
- Giotto Dainelli, Marco Polo, Paris, Denoël. (1946)
- Mario Soldati, Amérique, premier amour : scènes de la vie américaine, Paris, Portes de France. (1947)
- Mario Soldati, L'Affaire Motta, Paris, Pavois. (1947)
- Guido Piovene, Histoire de Marcos, in Revue de Paris. (September 1948)
- Guido Piovene, La Gazette noire, Paris, Laffont. (1949)
- Luigi Santucci, Un soulier, conte de Noël, La Pensée française, no 2. (1956)
- Prudencio de Pereda, Fiesta, coll. Climats, Grasset. (1957)
- Alberto Moravia, Agostino, Flammarion. (1962)
- Gian Dàuli, Magie blanche, coll. Les Chemins de l'Italie, Paris, Desjonquères (reviewed and corrected by Jean-Noël Schifano)(1985)

== Awards ==
- 1946 : Denyse-Clairouin prize for the translation of The Scarlet Letter by Nathaniel Hawthorne. In 1955, the same translation won the prize for best foreign novel.
- 1965 : Gustave-Le Métais-Larivière prize of the Académie française for the translation of the autobiography of John Cowper Powys.
