= Golden Field Guide =

Series of field manual pocket books

Golden Field Guides
- Amphibians of North America; Birds of North America; Eastern Birds; Families of Birds; Minerals of the World; Night Sky; Reptiles of North America; Seashells of North America; Trees of North America; Wildflowers of North America
- Edited by: Herbert Zim, Vera Webster
- Country: United States
- Language: English
- Publisher: Western Publishing; Golden Press; St. Martin's Press (2001–present)
- Published: 1966–present
- Media type: Pocket book
- No. of books: 11

The Golden Field Guides are a series of larger pocket-sized books about the natural world which were created by Western Publishing and published under their "Golden Press" line (mostly used for children's books at the time), as a related series to the Golden Guides. Edited by Herbert Zim and Vera Webster, the books were written by experts in their field and illustrated with a simple straightforward style.

Unlike the Golden Guides, the Field Guides covered their subjects in greater depth, being more aimed at the high school/college level. They also had sturdier covers, obviously intending that they be used in the field. Most note that they are a "Guide to Field Identification" on the cover. To cover their subject matter in greater depth, and intended as both identification and educational, most of the Field Guides limited themselves to North America, while the Golden Guides were usually worldwide.

The series, updated, was relaunched in 2001 as "Golden Field Guides by St. Martin's Press". Certain titles have been discontinued, such as the Amphibians of North America and Families of Birds books.

== Series list ==
- Amphibians of North America, by Hobart Muir Smith (1978) — discontinued by St. Martin's Press
- Birds of North America, by Chandler Robbins and Bertel Bruun (1966)
- Eastern Birds, by James Coe (1994) — limited release in original but continued by St. Martin's Press
- Families of Birds, by Oliver L. Austin (1971) — originally published as a Golden Guide (small format) and later, slightly modified, as Golden Field Guide (large format); later discontinued by St. Martin's Press
- Reptiles of North America, by Hobart Muir Smith, Edmund D. Brodie, David M. Dennis, and Sy Barlowe (1982)
- Minerals of the World, by Charles A. Sorrell, illustrations by George F. Sandström (1973) — expansion of the "Rocks and Minerals" pocket guide, then later renamed Rocks and Minerals
- Seashells of North America, by R. Tucker Abbott (1968)
- Skyguide, by Mark R. Chartrand and Helmut K. Wimmer (1982) — later renamed Night Sky
- Trees of North America, by C. Frank Brockman and Rebecca A. Merrilees (1968)
- Wildflowers of North America, by Frank D. Venning and Manabu C. Saito (1984)

There were some other "Golden Guides" issued but not normally considered part of the regular series.

== Associated Series list ==
- National Parks of the World, by Kai Curry-Lindahl, Jean-Paul Harroy, and the International Union for Conservation of Nature and Natural Resources (1972) — volumes 1 & 2
- A Golden Guide to Environmental Organizations, by Bruce W. Halstead (1972)
- The Golden Guide to Lawns, Trees and Shrubs, by John Strohm (1961)
- The Golden Guide to Flowers A Handbook for Home Gardeners, by John Strohm (1962)
