= Ginny Gordon =

Series of juvenile mystery novels

Cover of first Ginny Gordon mystery

Ginny Gordon is the main character in a series of five mystery books for adolescent girls published by the Whitman Publishing company of Racine, Wisconsin from 1948 to 1956. The books were written by Julie Campbell Tatham, writing as Julie Campbell. Margaret Jervis was the illustrator.

In 1947 the Whitman Publishing company was seeking juvenile mystery and adventure book series, and Tatham sent them an outline and sample chapters of The Swap Shop Mystery, with Ginny Gordon as the heroine. The publisher liked the story, and it became Ginny Gordon and the Mystery of the Disappearing Candlesticks.

Tatham considered Ginny Gordon to be "a little sophisticated for the time", and she had added a sense of romance between Ginny and John. Whitman dropped the series after five books so the author could concentrate on Trixie Belden books, the second series begun by Tatham.

== Characters ==
Ginny Gordon is fourteen years old, has brown eyes and chestnut curly hair, and lives in Harristown, New York. She has an interest in solving mysteries. Her father is the owner and publisher of the Harristown News, the local newspaper.

Lucy Tryon has blonde hair. She is Ginny's best friend, and only recently moved to the area. Lucy is more reluctant than her friend to become involved in solving mysteries, but is willing to help when needed.

John Blaketon is fifteen years old, has thick black hair, and his hobby is carpentry. He is often the voice of reason, trying to keep Ginny out of trouble.

Whiz Reilly is John's thirteen year old twin cousin. He has freckles and red hair, and likes to tease Ginny. Whiz can repair most items that are run by electricity.

Babs Reilly is John's other thirteen year old twin cousin. She has freckles and red-gold pigtails, and often tells people clues that Ginny wishes had remained a secret.

Ginny, Lucy, John, Whiz and Babs belong to a club entitled the Hustlers. Though Ginny is the only club member actively seeking a mystery to solve, all of them help with investigations, and discover clues.

== Books in series ==
1. Ginny Gordon and the Mystery of the Disappearing Candlesticks (1948). The Hustlers start a swap shop as a money-making project, but have to solve the disappearance of two of Ginny's Great-Aunt Betsy's four heirloom silver candlesticks.
2. Ginny Gordon and the Missing Heirloom (1950). The Hustlers still have the swap shop, but now old Mrs. Arnold's pin is missing from a box she consigned to the shop, but now wants back. Ginny suspects someone wants to take over Mrs. Arnold's estate.
3. Ginny Gordon and the Mystery of the Old Barn (1951). The Hustlers sold the swap shop and now have a snack barn as a hangout for young people. Two criminals accidentally leave money at the snack barn.
4. Ginny Gordon and the Lending Library (1954). The Hustlers' latest project is a subscription lending library, and someone keeps trying to steal a popular novel.
5. Ginny Gordon and the Broadcast Mystery (1956). The Hustlers plan a used book sale at their lending library, and a rare and valuable book of Mrs. Arnold's is mistakenly donated. When Mrs. Arnold tries to recover the book, all the Hustlers are certain that it was not sold, but it cannot be found. A radio station asks Ginny to do a program on books.
