= Walter Berndt =

American cartoonist (1899–1979)

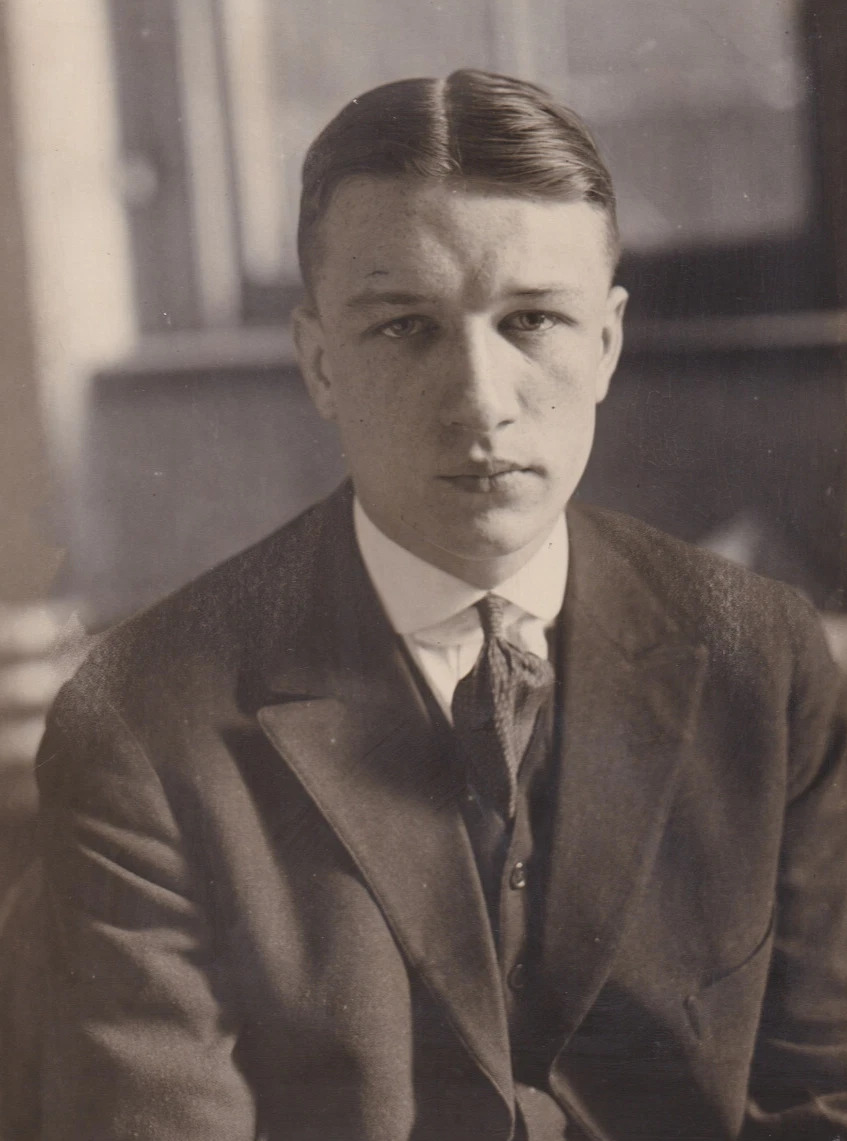
- Berndt, c. 1929
- Born: November 22, 1899 Brooklyn, New York, U.S.
- Died: August 15, 1979 (aged 79) Port Jefferson, New York, U.S.
- Area: Cartoonist
- Notable works: Smitty; Herby
- Awards: Reuben Award (1969)

Walter Berndt (November 22, 1899, – August 15, 1979) was an American cartoonist known for his comic strip Smitty, which he drew for 50 years.

== Biography ==
Bernt's job as an office boy at the New York Journal, which he took on after dropping out of high school in Brooklyn, put him in contact with leading cartoonists, as he recalled,

When I was 16, I worked as office boy for Tad, Herriman, Hershfield, Tom McNamara, also Hoban, McCay, Gross, T. E. Powers, C. D. Batchelor, Sterrett and Segar. Not much money but a million dollars worth of experience! Stayed with the New York Journal for five years, sweeping floors, running errands, drawing strips, sport cartoons and what have you. Then one year with World Telegram. From there to the Daily News in 1922 where Smitty and Herby work for me!

=== Fishing for ideas ===
Ed Black wrote about the method E. C. Segar and Berndt used to generate cartoon ideas:

Segar did another strip in the 1920s, but not on his own volition. One of his friends at the New York Journal was Walter Berndt who would in 1922 create the daily and Sunday Smitty strip for the Chicago Tribune-New York News Syndicate (under the aegis of the legendary Capt. Joseph Patterson), a feature destined to run for years. Both liked fishing. Berndt was doing a two-column strip called Then the Fun Began, inherited from Milt Gross. Both Segar and Berndt would finish their work by noon then steal away to an old pier on the Jersey side and spend the afternoon fishing and thinking up ideas. "We'd finish the day with a bunch of fish and about 15 or 20 ideas each," Berndt once said.

Then the Fun Began was appearing as early as March 3, 1919. When Berndt left that strip on October 13, 1921, it was taken over by Fred Faber, who continued it until 1928.

=== Origins of Smitty ===
Berndt's first strip, That's Different, drawn for the Bell Syndicate, lasted less than a year. In 1922, he created Smitty, which he continued until 1973, working with his assistant Charles Mueller. Yet it did not begin without a struggle, as cartoonist Mike Lynch described in a 2005 lecture:

After a stint drawing sports cartoons under T.A. "Tad" Dorgan (If you look at Walter Berndt's signature, you can see he draws his "T" just like Tad did), he took over the And the Fun Begins panel from Milt Gross. By 1920 Berndt had left the Journal to start his own strip. The strip lasted a year. Then he worked at the New York World. But, within weeks, he was fired for insubordination. (I tried to find out more about this, but this is all I know.) Berndt was out of work and broke. So, with zany cartoonist timing, he got married! And then he began making the rounds with a new strip titled Billy the Office Boy. It was 1922. The World Series was on. Big news, and so no one could get near the editors. Berndt couldn't get in to see anyone. Segar said there wasn't a World Series in Chicago and suggested he send the proposal to Captain Patterson. So Berndt mailed the strip to the Chicago Tribune. Patterson, opening a phone book for reference, renamed it Smitty and bought it at Berndt's high asking price. The strip became a mainstay, with the adventures of Smitty and Herby continuing for over 50 years.

He also produced the comic strip Herby, a topper strip of Smitty, from 1938 through 1960.

In 1937, Berndt moved to Port Jefferson, Long Island, where he lived until his death at age 79. He died on Monday, August 15, 1979, at Mather Memorial Hospital in Port Jefferson,

Walter Berndt's Smitty (May 5, 1933)

== Awards ==
Berndt won the Reuben Award for 1969 for Smitty.

== Legacy: The Berndt Toast Gang ==

The Berndt Toast Gang, named in honor of Walter Berndt, is a group of Long Island cartoonists who meet on the last Thursday of each month, as explained by cartoonist Lee Ames:

When the Long Island group, Creig Flessel, Bill Lignante, Frank Springer, Al Micale and I got together to work for Hanna Barbera in the 1960s, we decided to have a Finnegan's Bar lunch every last Thursday of the month. During that period, Creig brought Walter Berndt to join us. We fell in love with the cigar-smoking old-timer (look who's talking!), as he did with us. After a couple of years he passed away and left us grieving. Thereafter, whenever we convened on Thursdays, we'd raise a toast to Walter's memory. On one such, my big mouth opened and uttered, "Fellas, it's time for the Berndt toast!" I wasn't trying to be cute at the time, but I'm not displeased that it stuck and we became the Berndt Toast Gang, one of the largest branches of the National Cartoonists Society.
