= Magic Slate =

Children's drawing toy

- Magic Slate illustrated with Peanuts cartoon characters
- Type: Drawing toy
- Invented by: R. A. Watkins
- Company: Watkins-Strathmore (1920s–1958); Western Publishing (1958–1996); Golden Books Publishing (1996–2001)
- Country: United States
- Availability: 1920s–2001

Magic Slate (also known as Magic Slate paper saver) is a children's drawing toy. It was invented by R. A. Watkins in 1923 in the United States, and has remained in production for over seven decades. Besides being a toy, it is also used as an erasable message board and a communication device for people unable to speak. Magic Slates were also used during the Cold War by US Embassy staff in Moscow to thwart attempts by the KGB to intercept their communications.

The Magic Slate has been described as "one of the all-time great cheap toys", and "the unsung, silent hero of the Cold War".

== Operation ==
The Magic Slate consists of a piece of rigid cardboard the size of a small clipboard that is covered with dark waxed paper on one side, a sheet of translucent plastic film that covers the waxed paper and is affixed to the top of the board, and a blunt stylus made of wood or plastic. When writing or drawing on the plastic film with the stylus, the plastic sticks to the underlying wax paper where it was pressed down and wax's dark color shows through the plastic, revealing what was written. To erase whatever was drawn or written, the plastic sheet is lifted, which detaches itself from the wax paper and makes the dark areas disappear.

== Other versions ==
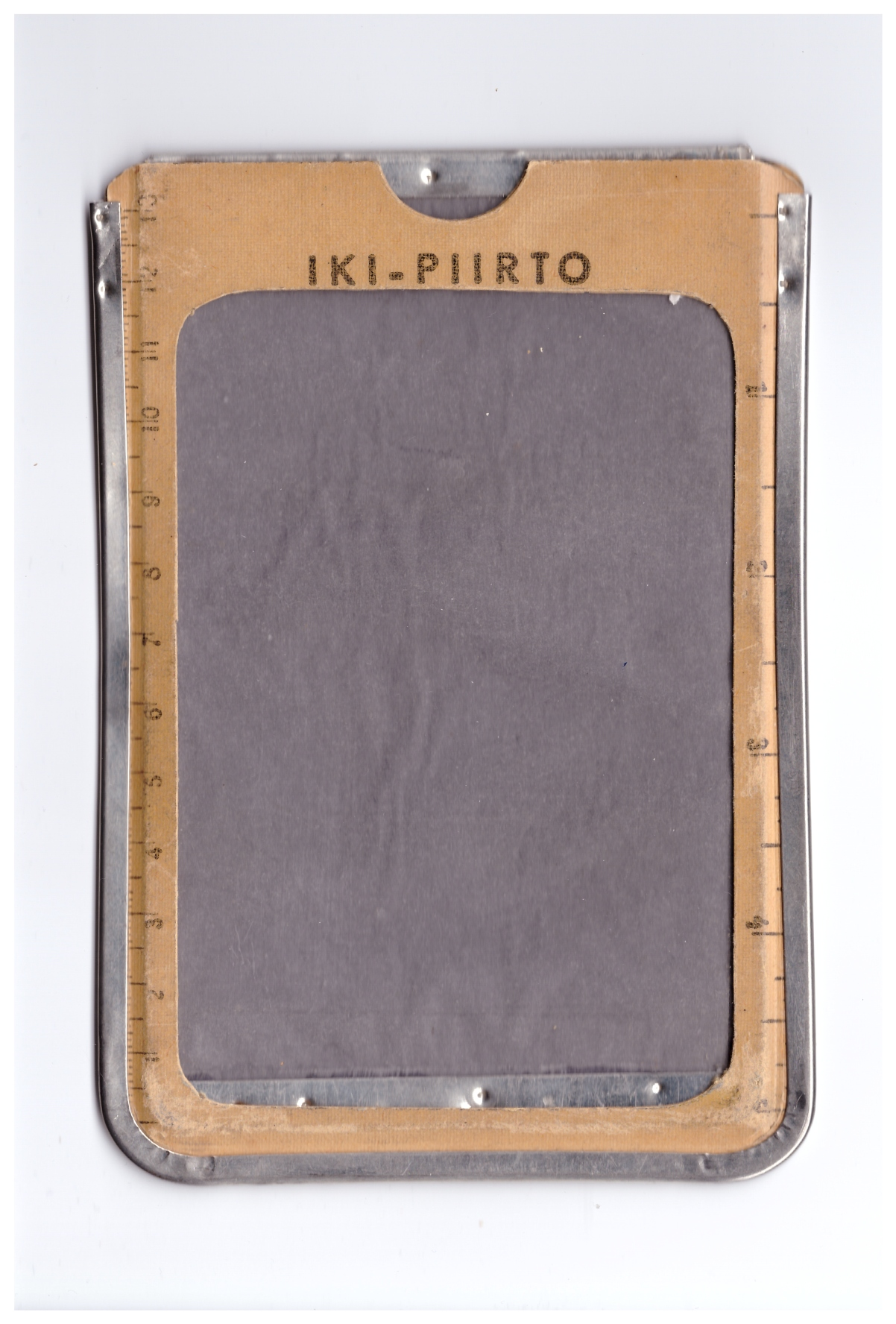
'Iki-piirto' writing pad with a multiplication table on the backside.

Based on the general principle of interaction between waxy and translucent layers, similar devices varied in design and were produced by different companies over the world. Sigmund Freud described such Wunderblock, comparing it to "the structure of the perceptive apparatus of the mind" in his 1924 "Note on the Mystic Writing-Pad" (later mentioned by Jacques Derrida in Writing and Difference). The devices of this kind were also known as Iki-piirto in Finland, Printator in Great Britain, Super Slate.

== History ==
The Magic Slate was invented in 1923 by R. A. Watkins, born c. 1888 in Baraboo, Wisconsin. It was originally intended to be used as a paper saver on the factory floor of a corset factory where Watkins worked in Aurora, Illinois. He made it out of a wax board and pieces of plastic, which enabled it to be used as a reusable timesheet. But when he showed it to his children, he saw the potential for it to be used as a toy. Watkins went into partnership in the 1920s with the Strathmore Company, a printer in Aurora. "Magic Slate" was registered as a trademark, and Watkins-Strathmore began production of the toy.

The toy "was an enormous success", and in the 1950s it attracted the attention of media companies like The Walt Disney Company. They licensed production of the toy with its frame decorated with pictures of comic book heroes, such as Batman and The Hulk, Disney characters, such as Mickey Mouse and Bambi, and popular stars from TV shows and films. Magic Slates went on to be more than just a child's toy. They were also used as erasable message boards and communication devices for people unable to speak, particularly in hospitals.

The Watkins-Strathmore partnership was taken over by Western Publishing in Racine, Wisconsin, in 1958, which continued manufacturing the toy in Aurora, and later in Fayetteville, North Carolina. In 1996 Western Publishing was renamed Golden Books Family Entertainment, which continued to produce Magic Slates until it was purchased by DIC Entertainment in 2001. However, DIC would pass off the purchase due to high costs and instead Golden Books was eventually acquired jointly by Classic Media and Random House in a bankruptcy auction.

=== Counterespionage ===
In the 1950s the Magic Slate was used by US Embassy staff in Moscow to thwart attempts by the Soviets to intercept their communications. Jeremy Duns stated in his 2013 book Dead Drop: The True Story of Oleg Penkovsky and the Cold War's Most Dangerous Operation:

In 1952, an electronic sweep of the American ambassador's residence had revealed that a wooden replica of the Great Seal of the United States that had been a gift from a Soviet youth group at the end of the war contained a listening device. As a result, the Americans were convinced that microphones were hidden throughout the embassy, and some staff had taken to communicating with each other by writing on children's Magic Slate doodle pads, which they would wipe clean after each message so that no trace of sensitive conversations remained.

Magic Slates were freely available and cheap and enabled the embassy staff to exchange messages silently without leaving any trace of their communications.

In the mid-1980s the Magic Slate was used once again in Moscow when the Soviets were caught bugging the US Embassy. Senators and aides visiting Moscow came equipped with slates. Newspaper reports of the Magic Slate's role in the US Embassy were a windfall for Western Publishing, and they increased production of the toy. They also shipped several thousand Magic Slates to the US State Department. In a covering letter to then President Reagan, Secretary of State George Shultz and the Director of Central Intelligence, the publisher wrote: "We are not often called upon to serve our country's defense, so we are pleased at the prospect of making a contribution." The units were returned unused with thanks as the US Embassy surveillance problem had been resolved.

== In popular culture ==
Magic Slates are used in the TV show, Evil, episode "S Is for Silence" (2021). It takes place in a monastery where the monks and nuns observe a vow of silence and communicate with each other using Magic Slates decorated with colorful cartoon characters. A Woody Woodpecker Super Slate features in "Endure and Survive" (2023), an episode of the TV show, The Last of Us. In it, a deaf boy uses a slate to communicate with others.

== See also ==
- Wax tablet
- Etch A Sketch
