= Whitman Authorized Editions =

The Whitman Authorized Editions (1941-1947) were published by the Whitman Publishing Company of Racine, Wisconsin. Each of the books featured a popular film actress' name in the title and her image on the dust jacket. While the Whitman Authorized Editions are not a book series named as such, each book features a fictional analogue of a '40s era teenage star as the protagonist of a mystery story. Stars featured in the series included Deanna Durbin, Bonita Granville, Judy Garland, Ginger Rogers, Betty Grable, and Ann Sheridan. Critics have remarked on the similarity in tone and story structure between the Whitman Authorized Editions and the Nancy Drew series.

Whitman continued to publish books based upon licensed properties - film and TV productions, for the most part - into the 1970s. These books were also marked as "Authorized Edition" but were not part of this series.

== World War II ==
Many of the protagonists model ways for girls and young women to help the war effort on the home front, and some of the books explicitly mention World War II events. For example, Ginger Rogers plays a telephone switchboard operator who is moved to assist in the war effort after the bombing of Pearl Harbor.

== Writers ==
It is not known whether the series was in fact "authorized" by the film studios that employed the actresses featured. The books were written by a team of writers. Though most of the authors were journalists or copywriters who pitched and completed series installments on an individual basis, one of the most consistent authors was Kathryn Heisenfelt, a Minnesotan journalist and playwright.

== Books ==
- Deanna Durbin and the Adventure of the Blue Valley (1941)
- Deanna Durbin and the Feather of Flame (1941)
- Bonita Granville and the Mystery of Star Island (1942)
- Ann Rutherford and the Key to Nightmare Hall (1942)
- Jane Withers and the Hidden Room (1942)
- Ginger Rogers and the Riddle of the Scarlet Cloak (1942)
- Betty Grable and the House with the Iron Shutters (1943)
- Jane Withers and the Phantom Violin (1943)
- Ann Sheridan and the Sign of the Sphinx (1943)
- Jane Withers and the Swamp Wizard (1944)
- Judy Garland and the Hoodoo Costume (1945)
- Shirley Temple and the Spirit of Dragonwood (1945)
- Shirley Temple and the Screaming Specter (1946)
- Gene Tierney and the Invisible Wedding Gift (1947)
- Betty Grable and the House of Cobwebs (1947)
- Dorothy Lamour and the Haunted Lighthouse (1947)
