= Smitty (comic strip) =

American comic strip by Walter Berndt

- Herby in Walter Berndt's Smitty (February 13, 1955)
- Author: Walter Berndt
- Current status/schedule: Concluded daily & Sunday strip
- Launch date: November 27, 1922
- End date: 1974
- Syndicate(s): Chicago Tribune Syndicate

Smitty was a newspaper comic strip created in the early 1920s by Walter Berndt. Syndicated nationally by the Chicago Tribune New York News Syndicate, it ran from November 27, 1922, to 1974 and brought Berndt a Reuben Award in 1969.

== Characters and story ==
The strip featured young office boy Augustus Smith aka Smitty, his six-year-old brother Herby, his girlfriend Ginny and his dog Scraps. Other characters were Smitty's boss, Mr. Bailey, and the Indian guide, Little Moose. Berndt based the strip on his own experience as an office boy, recalling, "I learned the tricks, shenanigans and schemes of an office boy and became expert at them." Berndt saw his creation as featuring "flashbacks of things you did as a young fellow." As the strip progressed, the teenage Smitty aged to young adulthood (approximately 13 to 23) and eventually got married.

From January 11, 1938 through 1974, Berndt also produced the comic strip Herby as a topper to Smitty on the Sunday page.

== Origins of Smitty ==
Smitty's younger brother, Herby.

Berndt's first strip, That's Different, drawn for the Bell Syndicate, lasted less than a year. In 1922, he created Smitty, which he continued until 1973. Yet it did not begin without a struggle, as cartoonist Mike Lynch described in a 2005 lecture:

After a stint drawing sports cartoons under T.A. "TAD" Dorgan (If you look at Walter Berndt's signature, you can see he draws his "T" just like TAD did), he took over the And the Fun Begins panel from Milt Gross. By 1920, Berndt had left the Journal to start his own strip. The strip lasted a year. Then he worked at The New York World. But within weeks, he was fired for insubordination. (I tried to find out more about this, but this is all I know.) Berndt was out of work and broke. So, with zany cartoonist timing, he got married! And then he began making the rounds with a new strip titled Billy the Office Boy. It was 1922. The World Series was on. Big news, and so no one could get near the editors. Berndt couldn't get in to see anyone. Segar said there wasn't a World Series in Chicago and suggested he send the proposal to Captain Patterson. So Berndt mailed the strip to the Chicago Tribune. Patterson, opening a phone book for reference, renamed it Smitty and bought it at Berndt's high asking price. The strip became a mainstay, with the adventures of Smitty and Herby continuing for over 50 years.

== Books and toys ==
1935 hand-colored original of Smitty by Walter Berndt

Smitty merchandising included tin toys, Cupples & Leon reprint books, comic books and sheet music for the song "Smitty". The Smitty tin toy is valued at more than $1000.

== Awards ==
Berndt won a Reuben Award in 1969 for Smitty.

== Sources ==
- NCS Awards
