= Arthur L. Flory =

American artist

Arthur L. Flory (1914 – 1972) was an American artist. He was born in Lima, Ohio and attended the Philadelphia Museum School of Industrial Art and National Academy of Design. Flory wrote several children's books, created landscape paintings, and taught at the Tyler School of Art at Temple University. Flory was a member of the National Serigraph Society. He was married to the author and illustrator Jane Flory. The couple had three children.

He died in Melrose Park, Pennsylvania. His work is in the National Gallery of Art and the Pennsylvania Academy of the Fine Arts.
