= Whitman Publishing =

American publishing company

- Parent company: Whitman Brands
- Founded: 1915
- Country of origin: United States
- Headquarters location: Virginia Beach, Virginia
- Key people: John Feigenbaum, CEO
- Publication types: Books, coin folders, coin albums, games, postage stamp albums
- Imprints: H. E. Harris & Co., Friedberg
- No. of employees: 50
- Official website: whitman.com

Whitman Publishing is an American book publishing company that started as a subsidiary of the Western Printing & Lithographing Company of Racine, Wisconsin. In about 1915, Western began printing and binding a line of juvenile books for the Hamming-Whitman Publishing Company of Chicago. A few years later, Hamming-Whitman went bankrupt, and Western took over the company. Western found success in selling the inventory of low-cost juvenile books and formed the Whitman Publishing Company.

Whitman now primarily produces coin and stamp collecting books and materials. The company was owned by Anderson Press until October 2023, when it was sold to CDN Publishing, LLC, home of the Greysheet. The combined companies now operate under the global brand name of Whitman Brands.

== Children's book publisher ==
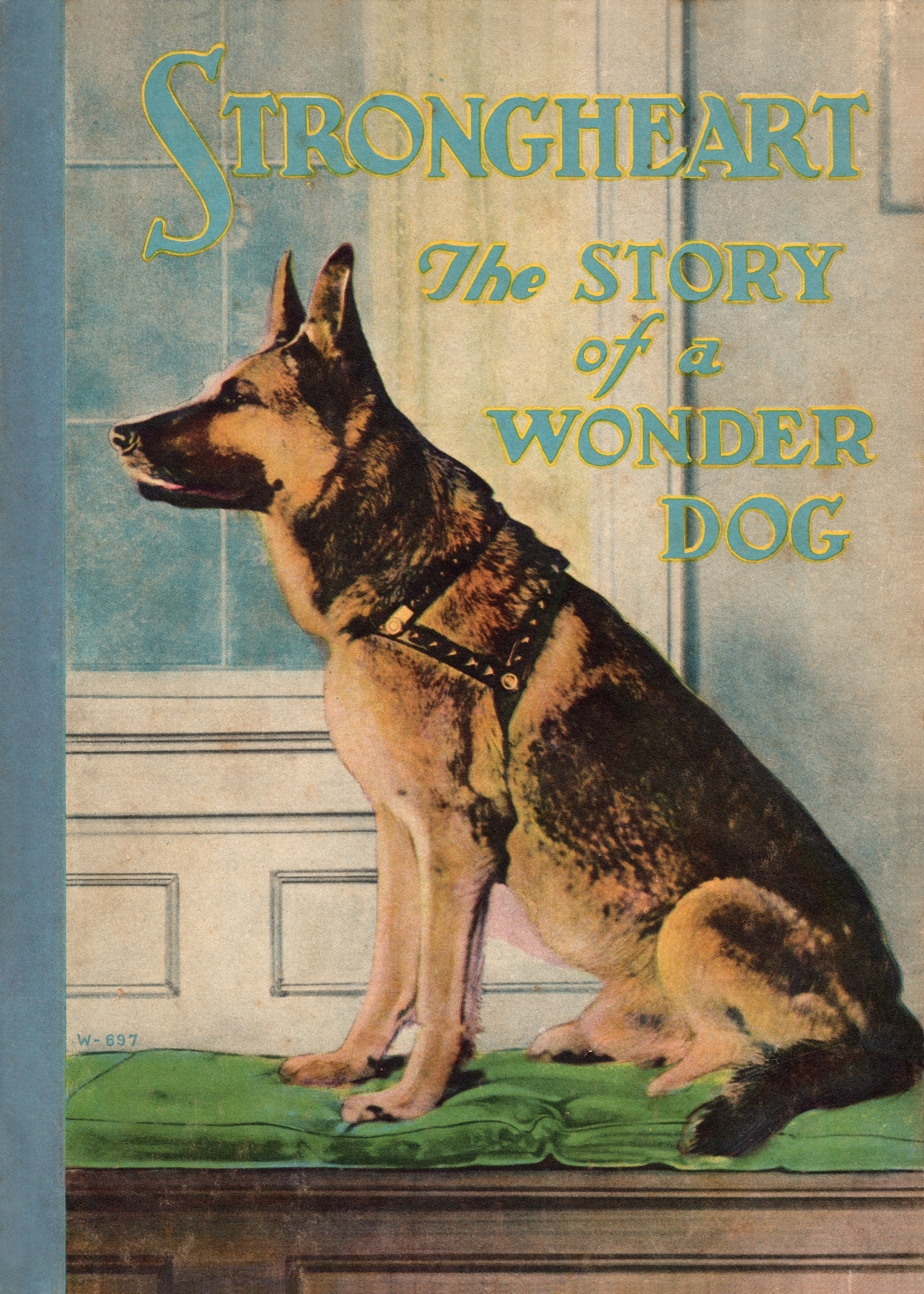
1926 children's book cover

From the early 1900s to the mid-1980s, Whitman was a popular children's book publisher. For decades, it was a subsidiary of Western Publishing Company. In 1933, the company signed a licensing contract with Walt Disney to produce books based on Disney cartoon characters, such as Mickey Mouse, Donald Duck, and Goofy.

Books about film and television dog stars, including Rin-Tin-Tin and Strongheart, were published.

Whitman also published Whitman Authorized Editions with stories featuring fictionalized versions of popular actresses of the 1940s and, later, novels based upon popular television shows, such as Captain Kangaroo, The Patty Duke Show, and The Beverly Hillbillies.

One of Whitman's most popular mystery series was Trixie Belden. In 1977, they launched the Trixie Belden Fan Club, and issued a lower-priced paperback book format of the series. At the time some booksellers stated that the Trixie Belden books were more popular than Nancy Drew and The Hardy Boys books. Other children's book series were Meg Duncan and Power Boys Adventure.

Whitman published the Big Little Books and Better Little Books. The early Big Little Books had print runs of 250,000 to 350,000 for each title, with no reprints.

They also published illustrated card games including War, Hearts, Fish, Old Maid, and Crazy Eights.

== Coin and stamp collecting products ==
By the mid-1930s, Whitman began a line of coin boards that helped popularize the coin-collecting hobby. A Handbook of United States Coins was first published in 1942. The first edition of A Guide Book of United States Coins (known as the "Red Book") was published in 1946. It is their most successful title; the 2026 edition is the 79th annual volume in the series. Over 25 million copies have been sold since its first publication, with over 200,000 copies selling every year.

This book started an expanding line of publications aimed at numismatists. The line continued after Western was sold to Mattel in 1982, then was spun off and renamed Golden Books Family Entertainment. The new company sold Whitman Coin Products and other adult lines to St. Martin's Press. St. Martin's, in turn, sold Whitman Coin Products to the H. E. Harris company, another publisher that specialized in coin and postage stamp collecting materials. H. E. Harris was then renamed Whitman Publishing, which continues to produce primarily coin and postage stamp collecting books and materials.

As of November 2023, Whitman Publishing is owned by CDN Publishing and operates under the global brand name Whitman Brands.

In addition to the Red Book, Whitman publishes the Mega Red (companion to the Red Book) and Blue Book (wholesale pricing), as well as monthly wholesale pricing guides like the Greysheet (coins) and the Greensheet (currency).

Whitman hosts the Whitman Coins & Collectibles Expo at the Baltimore Convention Center three times a year.

As of 2025, Whitman also published books on other topics in addition to the coin and postage stamp collecting materials and books.

== Gallery ==
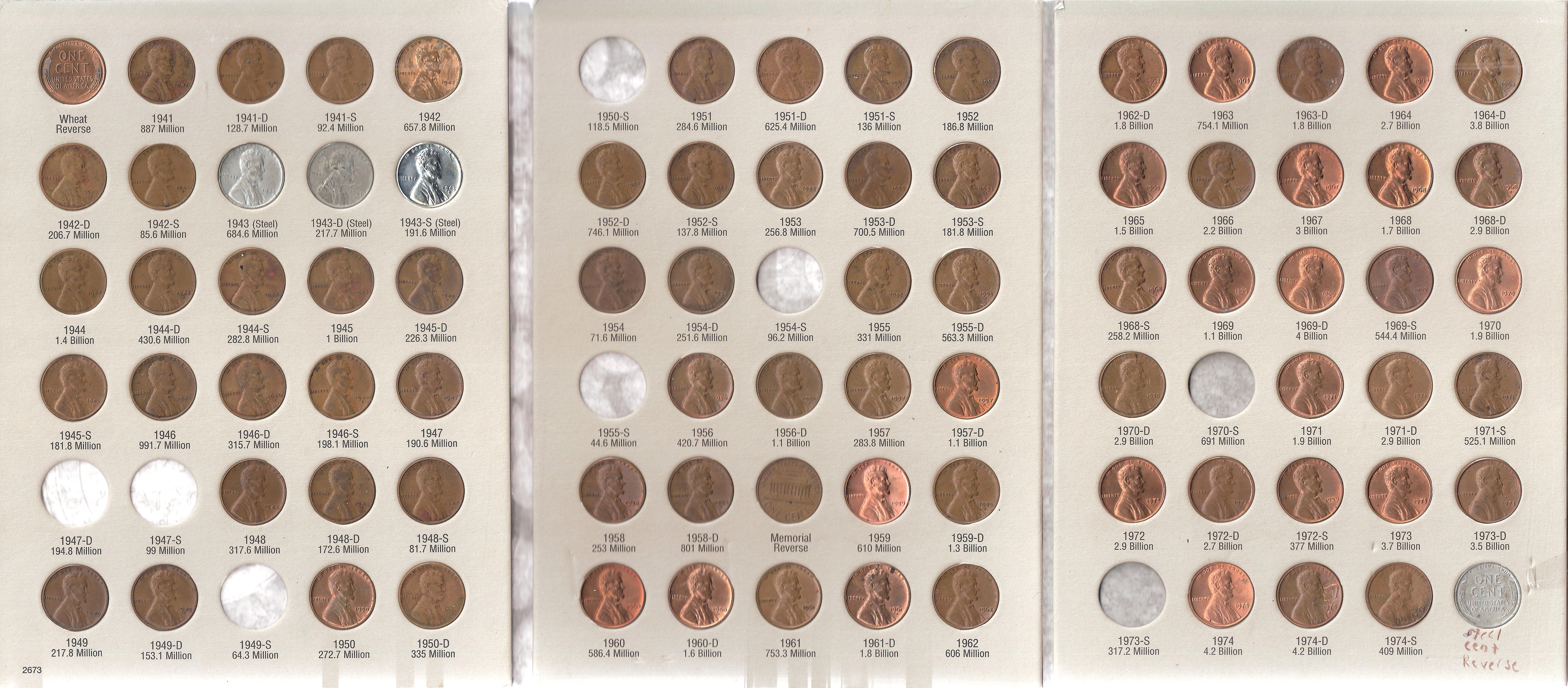
A coin board featuring Lincoln cents ranging in date from 1941 to 1974
