= Welder Wildlife Foundation =

Coordinates: 28.1137°N 97.4170°W

The Rob and Bessie Welder Wildlife Foundation or Welder Wildlife Refuge was established by the will of Robert Hughes Welder in 1954 with a grant of 7,800 acres (31.5 km^{2}) of prime wildlife habitat adjacent to the Aransas River in northern San Patricio County, Texas, approximately seven miles north-east of Sinton, Texas. The Foundation's ranch operations are supported by oil and gas royalties, cattle, interest on investments, and contributions. As a part of the will, the Foundation is required to maintain oil, cattle, and provide educational opportunities. The Foundation also provides fellowships to Master's and Ph.D. students in the natural resource field through an accredited university. As of 2024, the Foundation has funded more than 350 graduate students from 66 universities since 1956.

The Foundation came into existence on January 1, 1954, at which point the original trustees, John James Welder IV, Harvey C. Weil, and Patrick Welder were appointed. They appointed the first Director of the Foundation, Dr. Clarence Cottam, and first Assistant Director, Caleb Glazener.

The Foundation houses a Natural History Collection within the Museum and Roy Quillin Collection Wing. Specimens include: The Donald Bowman Exhibit- 405 taxidermized specimens; 170 species represented. The Roy Quillin Egg Collection0 10,000 eggs; 400 species represented. Francis Lee Jacques Art Collection- 3, 3-D paintings, 6 wildlife dioramas. Herbarium- 1,400 pressed plants Avian Study skins- 545 species represented. Herpetology Collection- 104 species represented. Mammalian Collection- 61 species represented. Historical Library- 24,000 volumes of books; some rare texts dating back to the 1600s

The Foundation is located in the Coastal Bend Region of Texas. The 16 different vegetation communities on the Refuge enhance the diversity of the wildlife supported by the Refuge. To date approximately 490 species of birds, mammals, reptiles, and amphibians have been reported on the Refuge.
