= Vicki Barr, Flight Stewardess =

Mystery series for girls by Helen Wells

- First volume in the series
- Silver Wings for Vicki; Vicki Finds the Answer; The Hidden Valley Mystery; The Secret of Magnolia Manor; The Clue of the Broken Blossom; Behind the White Veil; The Mystery at Hartwood House; Peril Over the Airport; The Mystery of the Vanishing Lady; The Search for the Missing Twin; The Ghost at the Waterfall; The Clue of the Gold Coin; The Silver Ring Mystery; The Clue of the Carved Ruby; The Mystery of Flight 908; The Brass Idol Mystery
- Author: Helen Wells (vol. 1-4, 9-16); Julie Campbell Tatham (vol. 5-8)
- Country: United States
- Language: English
- Genre: Mystery
- Publisher: Grosset & Dunlap
- Published: 1947–1964
- Media type: Print
- No. of books: 16

Vicki Barr is a popular mystery series for girls published by Grosset & Dunlap from 1947 to 1964. Helen Wells (1910–1986) wrote volumes #1-4 and 9-16, and Julie Campbell Tatham (1908–1999), the creator of Trixie Belden, wrote volumes #5-8.

== List of titles ==
#	Title	Copyright
1	Silver Wings for Vicki	1947
2	Vicki Finds the Answer	1947
3	The Hidden Valley Mystery	1948
4	The Secret of Magnolia Manor	1949
5	The Clue of the Broken Blossom	1950
6	Behind the White Veil	1951
7	The Mystery at Hartwood House	1952
8	Peril Over the Airport	1953
9	The Mystery of the Vanishing Lady	1954
10	The Search for the Missing Twin	1954
11	The Ghost at the Waterfall	1956
12	The Clue of the Gold Coin	1958
13	The Silver Ring Mystery	1960
14	The Clue of the Carved Ruby	1961
15	The Mystery of Flight 908	1962
16	The Brass Idol Mystery	1964

== See also ==
- Stratemeyer Syndicate
