= Helen Wells =

American novelist

Helen Wells (1910–1986) was the author of nurse Cherry Ames books, a series for young teens. She wrote volumes #1–7 and #17–27. She was also the author of the first four Vicki Barr books and possibly the last Vicki Barr book.
