= Power Boys =

Series of juvenile mystery novels

The cover of the first Power Boys mystery

The Power Boys are a series of six juvenile mystery novels that were published from 1964 to 1967 by Whitman Publishing. The books were written by Mel Lyle, a pseudonym, and illustrated by Raymond Burns.

The books were aimed at the pre-teen market.

== The characters ==
Jack Power (age 17), Chip Power (age 15), and their Dalmatian dog, Blaze, live with the boys' photojournalist father Thomas Power. Since the death of their mother Jack and Chip travel with Mr. Power during school vacation and come upon mysteries, which they investigate.

Jack Power is described as being tall and slender, with reddish-brown hair cut short, and he has green eyes and freckles. He is portrayed as more serious and dependable than his younger brother.

Chip Power is slim, almost as tall as Jack, has blond hair with reddish glints, and his eyes are blue. He is more impulsive, and sometimes his eyes or face are described as mischievous.

Thomas Power is about as tall as Jack, but looks shorter because he is of heavier build. His hair is black and streaked with premature grey. The boys and their father are portrayed as very close to each other.

Detective James Wilson, of the New York Police Department, is a tall man with white hair and gray eyes. He is Mr. Power's oldest and dearest friend.

Dick Donovan looks very similar to Jack – tall and lean, with red hair and freckles. He is the son of wealth Barry Donovan, and appears in the last two novels.

Blaze is a Dalmatian dog that Mr. Power bought from a Los Angeles fireman. The Dalmatian joined the family at the end of the first book, after Mr. Power returned from covering a brush fire that threatened Griffith Park. His name was chosen because of his firefighter connection.

== Book titles and settings ==
The six books in the series are as follows:

1. The Mystery of the Haunted Skyscraper (1964)
2. The Mystery of the Flying Skeleton (1964)
3. The Mystery of the Burning Ocean (1965)
4. The Mystery of the Million-Dollar Penny (1965)
5. The Mystery of the Double Kidnapping (1966)
6. The Mystery of the Vanishing Lady (1967)

In The Mystery of the Double Kidnapping Jack tells his new friend, Dick Donovan, that he lives in Chicago, but none of the books take place there, since the Power Boys travel with their father during vacations. Three of the books are set in New York City (books 1, 5, and 6), but it is not until the third of these New York books, which is the last in the series, that the family makes the city their new home, since Barry Donovan, a wealthy man who appeared in book five, could supply Thomas Power with a lot of future work. The first paragraph of this last book tells how much the brothers love their new eight-room apartment. Mrs. Donovan helped with the decorating.

Book 2, The Mystery of the Flying Skeleton, takes place in the Florida Keys before and during a hurricane; book 3, The Mystery of the Burning Ocean, takes place in Bermuda; and book 4, The Mystery of the Million-Dollar Penny, takes place in the Ozarks.

== Editions ==
The books were published with illustrated hard covers, but no dust jackets. Raymond Burns's line illustrations were done in a single color, which varies from book to book.

== Series authors ==
It is likely that the series was written by two authors. William Larson, an editor hired by Whitman in 1964, stated that if more than one book in a series was published in a year, they were almost always written by different people. A 1964 article stated that sometimes two authors write under the same pseudonym, "such as Julie Campbell or Mel Lyle", but Whitman restricted the writers under one byline "because juvenile readers detect differences in style and send letters of complaint".

William Manners (the pen name of William Rosenberg) wrote a series of mystery novels for Whitman Publishing, but there are no published sources stating who wrote the Power Boys series.

== Continuing interest in book series ==
The Power Boys mysteries are of interest to many who collect classic children's series books. In 1986 The Armchair Detective reported that the Summer 1986 issue of Mystery & Adventure Series Review published an article suggesting that the Power Boys author (or authors) may have borrowed ideas from other Whitman Publishing series. The October 2010 issue of Yellowback Library has a review of The Mystery of the Flying Skeleton, and the May 2011 issue of Susabella Passengers and Friends contains a review of the entire series, and asks subscribers if they know who wrote the books, using the pseudonym of Mel Lyle.

== Other Power Boys books ==
During the 1950s a series of short paperback Power Boys novels were published by Triple Nickel Books. These novels were written by Arthur Benwood, and told of the adventures of Ted and Steve Power. The books sold for fifteen cents each (three nickels).
