= James Gordon Irving =

American illustrator and painter (1913–2012)

James Gordon Irving (June 2, 1913 – August 15, 2012) was a commercial illustrator and painter, best known for illustrating the early Golden Guide series of nature books.

== Life and career ==
Irving, who went by the name Gordon, was born in Ridgefield Park, New Jersey. Interested in natural-history illustration from an early age, he took art classes at the Dean Academy in Franklin, Massachusetts, and from the age of 17 at the Grand Central School of Art and the National Academy of Design in New York City. He served in the US Navy at a naval base in San Francisco during World War II, where he met his wife-to-be, Grace Crowe, moving back to New Jersey in 1947 to raise a family.

Irving worked as a commercial artist for many years, but is best known as the illustrator of the Golden Guides, pocket-size introductions to natural history for children; he illustrated the first, Birds (1949) by Herbert Zim & Ira Gabrielson, and eight more during the first years of the series: Insects (1951), Stars (1951), Trees (1952), Reptiles and Amphibians (1952), Fishes (1955), Mammals (1955), Zoology (1958), and Gamebirds (1961). When the series was relaunched in 2001, several of the books continued to feature Irving's paintings.

A resident of Haworth, New Jersey, Irving died aged 99 on August 15, 2012, survived by his two sons.
