= Herbert Zim =

American naturalist

- Born: July 12, 1909; New York City, U.S.
- Died: December 5, 1994 (aged 85); Plantation Key, Florida, U.S.
- Education: Columbia University
- Occupations: naturalist, author, editor, and educator
- Known for: Golden Guides
- Spouse(s): Sonia Bleeker; Grace Showe

Herbert Spencer Zim (July 12, 1909 – December 5, 1994) was an American naturalist, author, editor and educator best known as the founder (1945) and editor-in-chief of the Golden Guides series of nature books.

== Biography ==
Zim was born 1909 to Marco and Minnie (Orlo) Zim in New York City, but spent his childhood years in southern California. At the age of fourteen he returned to the east. He took his degrees (B.S. biologia, M.S. biologia, Ph.D. botanica) at Columbia University.

Zim wrote or edited more than one hundred books on science, and in a thirty-year career teaching in the public schools introduced laboratory instruction into elementary school science. He is best known as the founder in 1945 (and, for twenty-five years, editor in chief) of the Golden Guides, pocket-size introductions for children to such subjects as fossils, zoology, microscopy, rocks and minerals, trees, wildflowers, dinosaurs, navigation and more. He was the sole or co-author for many of the books, which were valued for their clarity, accuracy and attractive presentation—helped by the illustrations of James Gordon Irving and Zim's friend Raymond Perlman. Zim taught Science Education at the University of Illinois Urbana-Champaign in the 1950s.

He moved to Florida with his wife, the Russian-born anthropologist Sonia (Sonnie) Bleeker (who donated her substantial collection of anthropological artifacts to the Logan Museum of Anthropology). Zim continued to work on the Golden Guides series until Alzheimer's disease forced him to slow down in the 1990s. He died in 1994 at Plantation Key, survived by his third wife, Grace Showe, and two sons, Aldwin and Roger.

== See also ==
- The Legend of Wan Hu
- Golden Field Guide
