= Bertel Bruun =

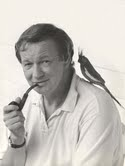
- Dr. Bertel Bruun
- Born: November 13, 1937 Skælskør, Denmark
- Died: 21 September 2011 (aged 73) Westhampton, New York

Bertel Bruun (November 13, 1937 – September 21, 2011) was a naturalist, international conservationist and neurologist. Bruun wrote many books and was the co-author of The Golden Field Guide to Birds of North America first published in 1966. He later became very involved in conservation efforts, most especially in the Middle East where he served as a liaison between the Israel and Egypt to promote the preservation of wildlife in the Sinai Peninsula when the region was handed back to Egypt after the 1978 Camp David Peace Treaty.

== Early life ==
Bruun was born in Skaelskor, Denmark, son to Erik Valdemar Marie Andre Ley Bruun and Ebba Kirstine Poulsen, the youngest of four children. He grew up in the Danish fishing village intending to follow his own father's career as a village doctor. Bruun had grown up in Occupied Denmark during World War II. He took a special pride in the fact that his oldest brother and father were active members of the Danish Resistance.

== Career ==
He attended the University of Copenhagen for his undergraduate studies and medical school, completing his studies there in 1964. He then moved to New York City where he served his internship at Lenox Hill Hospital and residency at Columbia Presbyterian Hospital. He became a practicing neurologist in association with Lenox Hill, Columbia Presbyterian, and Harlem Hospital. Bruun conducted research on the neurological impact of heroin on the human brain in the early 1970s. This led to a very brief stint as medical director of the first heroin treatment facility in New York City, a renegade enterprise organized by the mothers of heroin addicts fed up with the city's inaction to provide a treatment center. He later became head of the Columbia Presbyterian stroke center.

=== Writing ===
Bruun's work as an ornithologist coincided with his medical career. He went birding on weekends and vacations, often working in his study to late hours researching his books. He wrote more than fifteen books including two prize-winning children's books—The Human Body and The Brain with his wife Dr. Ruth Bruun. He also co-wrote Common Birds of Egypt—the only field guide to birds in that country. Bruun's interest in birds evolved into a passion to use the conservation of wildlife as a bridge for helping advance peace. In the 1970s Bruun became president of the Holy Land Conservation Fund, a non-profit organization based in New York City that was set up to help support wildlife preservation efforts in Israel. Bruun sought to expand the work in Israel to the fuller mission of advancing conservation in the Middle East. Birding moved from being a benign activity to hazardous duty. In 1978 he was in Tehran when the Shah of Iran was overthrown, leaving the country shortly before the Shah's downfall in an armored personnel carrier. While helping to advance peace between Israel and Egypt, his work posed a threat to violent groups who opposed the peace treaty.

== Later life ==
Bruun retired as a neurologist in 1989, having suffered several strokes. He started small business buying and selling toy soldiers called The March of Time. He subsequently wrote a definitive guide to the niche industry called The Toy Soldiers Identification and Price Guide in 1994.

== Publications ==
- Ducks, Geese, and Swans (The Odyssey Library) (1964)
- Canards, cygnes et oies (1965)
- Golden Field Guide to Birds of North America (1966)
- Birdwatching: A Guide to European Birds (1967)
- Hvad er det for en fugl? (1969)
- British & European Birds in colour (1969)
- The Hamlyn Guide to Birds of Britain and Europe (1970)
- Animals: the strange and exciting stories of their lives (1970)
- The Larousse Guide to Birds of Britain and Europe (1970)
- Natuurgids voor het observeren van vogels (1972)
- Euroopan lintuopas maastokäsikirja (1972)
- Concise Encyclopedia of Birds (1974)
- The Dell Encyclopedia of Birds (1974)
- Guía de las aves de España y de Europa (1980)
- Cappelens fuglehåndbok / Europas fugler i farger (1985)
- Common Birds of Egypt (1985)
- Der Kosmos-Vogelführer : Die Vögel Deutschlands und Europas in Farbe (1986)
- Toy Soldiers Identification and Price Guide (1994)
- A Mind of Its Own: Tourette's Syndrome A Story and a Guide (1994)
- The Brain (1998)
- The Human Body (1999)
- Alla Europas fåglar i färg : en fälthandbok
- Den nye fugleboken
- Aves de Portugal e da Europa
