= Trixie Belden =

Title character of "detective" mystery books

Trixie Belden and the Secret of the Mansion, the first Trixie Belden mystery

Trixie Belden is the title character in a series of "detective" mysteries written between 1948 and 1986. The first six books were written by Julie Campbell Tatham, who also wrote the Ginny Gordon series; the stories were then continued by various in-house writers from Western Publishing under the pseudonym Kathryn Kenny. Today the rights to the series are owned by Random House. The series was out of print for a number of years, but Random House began releasing a new edition of the books in mid-2003. As of mid-2006, volumes 1–15 have been reissued.

Beatrix "Trixie" Belden is a young teen living just outside the fictional town of Sleepyside-on-Hudson, in the Hudson Valley area of New York. She lives at Crabapple Farm, which had been in her family for either three or six generations (this varies between books), with her parents and three brothers, Brian, Mart, and Bobby. The first book establishes her friendship with lonely, sheltered rich girl Honey Wheeler, whose family has just moved into the Manor House next door. Soon, the girls are embroiled in their first case.

Throughout the series, the two girls solve mysteries that baffled authorities and, along with brothers and friends, form a club called the Bob-Whites of the Glen, have adventures, travel (though not as extensively as Nancy Drew, an older and more sophisticated girl sleuth), and struggle with school. Trixie has particular difficulties with math.

Trixie Belden was one of Whitman's most popular mystery series. In 1977 the publisher launched the Trixie Belden Fan Club and issued a lower-priced paperback book format of the series. At the time some booksellers stated that the Trixie Belden books were more popular than Nancy Drew and The Hardy Boys books.

== Main characters ==
The ages indicated refer to each character's age at the beginning of the series.

- Beatrix "Trixie" Belden: Thirteen-year-old Trixie Belden is one of the two co-presidents of the Bob-Whites of the Glen. Described as being short with a sturdy build, she has short blonde ringlets (either sandy blonde or strawberry blonde, depending on the edition), round blue eyes, and freckles. She has a tendency to jump to conclusions, but her hunches often prove to be correct. One of her chores is to take care of six-year-old Bobby. While she loves her little brother, she often loses patience with the mischievous child. She and Honey plan to one day open their own business: the Belden-Wheeler Detective Agency. Trixie has an amazing instinct for people and can accurately judge them before she gets to know them. Her best friends are Honey Wheeler and Di Lynch. She grows to like Jim toward end of the ninth book.
- Madeleine G. "Honey" Wheeler: Depending on the book, 13-year-old Honey Wheeler is either vice-president or secretary of the Bob-Whites of the Glen. She is described as tall, slender, and pretty, with shoulder-length golden-brown hair and large hazel eyes. Until moving to Sleepyside, she spent her life in boarding schools and summer camps, barely knowing her own parents. Her friendship with Trixie and the Bob-Whites has given her more confidence and helped her to forge a relationship with her parents and adopted brother. Generally regarded as the sweetest and most tactful of the Bob-Whites, she is also their star swimmer. She now attends Sleepyside Junior-Senior High School with the rest of the Bob-Whites, where she consistently earns high marks and praise. Honey and Brian seem to like each other.
- James '"Jim" Winthrop Frayne II: Fifteen-year-old Jim Frayne is the other co-president of the Bob-Whites of the Glen. The focus of the first two books, he is adopted by the Wheelers at the end of The Red Trailer Mystery, after successfully running away from his abusive stepfather. He has a Springer Spaniel named Patch. He is described as having red hair and green eyes, coincidentally the same coloring as his adoptive father, Matthew Wheeler. Jim is an expert equestrian and 'rides like a centaur'. He and Trixie are fond of each other, and Jim gives Trixie an orchid and later his ID bracelet, but the romantic angle is downplayed in later volumes. His goal is to one day use his inheritance to build a school for orphaned boys that will combine outdoor–naturalist activities with regular scholastics. Throughout the series, there is some inconsistency regarding his age.
- Brian Belden, 16, is the oldest of the four Belden children. Described as dark and handsome, he is by far the most level-headed of the seven Bob-Whites and plans to become a physician after finishing school. Throughout the series, Brian often provides first aid to his sister, Trixie, as well others who are injured during the course of the Bob-Whites' adventures. Brian is smart and mature, always the voice of reason and always trying to keep Trixie out of trouble. In the fifth book, Brian gets his first car, a jalopy purchased from Mr. Lytell, a storekeeper, for 50 dollars. Brian's first aid skills stretch to caring for automobiles, as he is often shown working on his car. They also extend to animals when he is given the responsibility for bandaging an injured horse owned by the Wheelers.
- Martin "Mart" Belden: Exactly 11 months older than Trixie, 14-year-old Martin Belden is often described as Trixie's 'almost-twin'. Mart is best known for both his appetite and his outsized vocabulary. He has a crush on Diana Lynch. He has a fondness for Cosmo McNaught space adventures books. In The Mystery of the Ghostly Galleon, Mart bickers with Trixie that Cosmo is better than Lucy from the Lucy Radcliff books Trixie likes so much. He plans to become a farmer, although The Pet Show Mystery gave him an interest in computers. Despite his frequent arguments with his sister (they are constantly teasing and picking on each other), the two are quite close.
- Diana "Di" Lynch: The prettiest girl in class, 13-year-old Diana Lynch has black hair and violet eyes (possibly due to the popularity of Elizabeth Taylor as a young actress at the time Diana's character was created). She has pairs of twin brothers and twin sisters who are much younger than herself. Her father recently made a lot of money, and Di hates being rich, though the Bob-Whites help her adjust. She joins the Bob-Whites in The Mysterious Visitor, inadvertently providing them with another mystery. She shows great artistic ability in later books and can be a bit gullible at times. She is not the most intelligent but is a good sport, smiling and laughing often, especially at herself when she makes mistakes. One consistent character trait established over the many stories is Di's love of the color purple.
- Daniel "Dan" Mangan: Orphaned in New York City and left to his own devices, Dan Mangan became mixed up in a street gang called the Cowhands. Juvenile court sends him to live with his uncle Regan, the Wheelers' groom, although he actually lives with and works for Mr. Maypenny, the gamekeeper. After a rough start in Sleepyside, Dan reforms and becomes the seventh Bob-White in The Black Jacket Mystery. His age is unknown; he begins school in Mart's homeroom but later must study during vacations to keep up with classes he takes with Brian and Jim. He intends to be a police officer in New York City.

== Supporting characters ==
- Helen (Johnson) Belden ("Moms"): Trixie's mother, a kind, sensible homemaker, she loves her children and keeps them honest.
- Peter Belden ("Dad"): Trixie's father, a smart, honest, and generous man, he works at the Sleepyside bank and loves his family very much.
- Robert "Bobby" Belden: The youngest Belden is only six when the series starts. Trixie babysits Bobby for her allowance, so she often has to check in on him and read him stories when she would much rather be solving a mystery.
- Reddy: The Belden's Irish Setter, he is affectionate, but resists all attempts to train him.
- Miss Margery Trask: She worked as a math teacher at Honey's old boarding school, but Honey liked her so much that Mr. Wheeler hired her to be Honey's governess. She mostly manages the estate. She is smart, sensible, and efficient; the Bob-Whites love Miss Trask, and she loves them. Miss Trask often accompanies the kids when they travel.
- William Bill Regan is a hot-headed but good-natured groom. In the first book, he teaches Trixie to ride horses and has been well loved by all the Bob-Whites since. Twenty-two in the first book, Regan is a good friend to the Bob-Whites, always helping out when they need him. He seems to have a love interest in The Mystery at Saratoga. He takes in his late sister's son, Dan Mangan, and brings him from New York City to live in Sleepyside with Mr. Maypenny as Mr. Maypenny's helper.
- Sgt. Wendell Molinson is the local police sergeant who is often called to a crime scene or goes to warn Trixie against pursuing the mystery. He is not fond of the Bob-Whites' frequent interference in police business and not shy about telling them so.
- Mr. Lytell is the shopkeeper of the local market and is very curious about the goings-on in the neighborhood (often portrayed as nosy), but sometimes looks the other way as he is fond of Miss Trask.

== Recurring characters ==
- Spider Webster is a local cop who is more welcoming of the Bob-Whites than is Sgt. Molinson.
- Mr. and Mrs. Wheeler: Honey's parents, and later Jim's adoptive parents, they are often away on business, leaving Miss Trask to look after Honey and Jim.
- Celia is the Wheelers' maid.
- Tom Delanoy is the Wheelers' chauffeur and is later married to Celia.
- Mr. Maypenny: The gamekeeper on the Wheeler estate, and a recluse, he lives on a pie-shaped piece of property in the middle of the game preserve.
- Mrs. Vanderpoel is a kind woman who lives nearby and knows nearly everyone in the area, plus much of the local history.
- Jonesy is Jim's abusive stepfather.
- Ben Riker is Honey's fun-loving cousin and his pranks — like switching the salt and sugar on the dinner table — sometimes rub others the wrong way.
- Uncle Andrew: Peter Belden's brother, he owns a sheep ranch in Iowa and a mountain cabin in the Ozarks. He has no children of his own, but he is fond of the Bob-Whites and invites them to stay with him when he can.
- Ned Schulz: Son of Uncle Andrew's neighbor in Iowa, he plays on the local high school basketball team and takes a liking to Trixie during the Bob-Whites' visit to Iowa.
- Bob and Barbara Hubbell: Twins from near Uncle Andrew's sheep ranch in Iowa and close friends of Ned Schulz, they play and sing folk songs together, including some that they wrote.
- Hallie is Trixie's cousin from Idaho and they do not always get along.
- Nick Roberts is a fellow student and is very artistic, particularly in sketching and painting. His father runs a local trophy shop in town.
- Harrison is the Lynches' butler and his very proper manner often clashes with Di's desire for a normal life.
- Dr. Ferris is the local physician, who sometimes makes house calls to the Belden or Wheeler home.
