= List of male detective characters =

Fictional male detective characters

G. K. Chesterton's Father Brown

This is a list of fictional male detective characters from novels, short stories, radio, television, and films.

== A ==
- Detective Chief-Inspector Roderick Alleyn, by Ngaio Marsh
- Kogoro Akechi, by Edogawa Ranpo
- Jonathan Ames, Bored to Death: A Noir-otic Story by Jonathan Ames
- Bob Andrews, Three Investigators by Robert Arthur Jr.
- Arjun, by Samaresh Majumdar
- Inspector Fumimaro Ayanokoji, by Gosho Aoyama

== B ==
- Byomkesh Bakshi, by Sharadindu Bandyopadhyay
- Goenda Baradacharan, by Shirshendu Mukhopadhyay
- Cyrus Barker by Will Thomas
- Parashor Barma, by Premendra Mitra
- John Barnaby, Midsomer Murders
- Tom Barnaby, Midsomer Murders
- Red Barry, Red Barry
- P. K. Basu, by Narayan Sanyal
- Martin Beck, by Sjöwall and Wahlöö
- Ambrose Bierce, by Oakley Hall
- Blacksad, by Juan Díaz Canales and Juanjo Guarnido
- Detective Inspector Napoleon "Bony" Bonaparte, by Arthur Upfield
- James Bond by Ian Fleming
- FBI Agent Seeley Booth, Bones, by Kathy Reichs
- Harry Bosch, by Michael Connelly
- Slam Bradley, Slam Bradley
- Father Brown, by G. K. Chesterton
- Romeo Brown, Romeo Brown
- Detective Sammy Bryant, Southland

== C ==
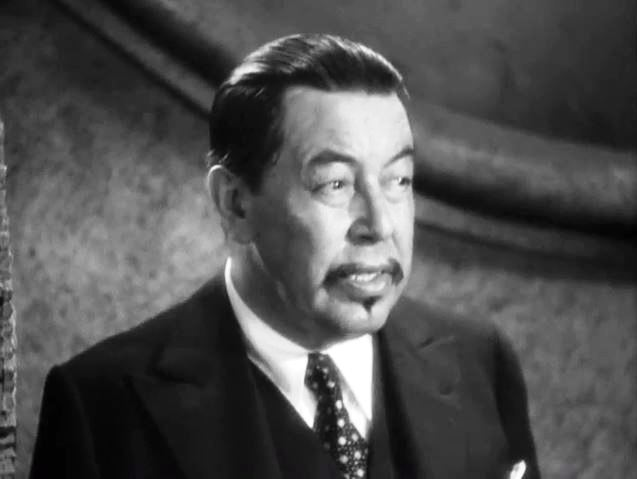
Charlie Chan

- Brother Cadfael, The Cadfael Chronicles by Ellis Peters
- Rick Cahill, Yesterday's Echo by Matt Coyle
- Lieutenant Horatio Caine, CSI: Miami
- Slim Callaghan, by Peter Cheyney
- Vincent Calvino, by Christopher G. Moore
- Albert Campion, by Margery Allingham
- Inspector Canardo, Canardo
- Frank Cannon, Cannon
- Nick Carter, Nick Carter
- Peter Timotheus "Tim" Carsten, TKKG by Rolf Kalmuczak
- Henri Cassin, So Dark the Night
- Richard Castle, Castle
- Charlie Chan, by Earl Derr Biggers
- Nick Charles, The Thin Man by Dashiell Hammett
- Dipak Chatterjee, by Samarendranath Pandey
- Clifton, by Raymond Macherot and later authors
- Inspector Clouseau, The Pink Panther
- Rustin Cohle, True Detective by Nic Pizzolatto
- Elvis Cole, by Robert Crais
- Lieutenant Columbo, Columbo
- FBI Special Agent Dale Cooper, Twin Peaks
- Michael Cordero, Jane the Virgin
- Peter Crenshaw, Three Investigators by Robert Arthur Jr.
- Carland Cross, Carland Cross.
- Mateo Cruz, BAU Section Chief, Criminal Minds

== D ==
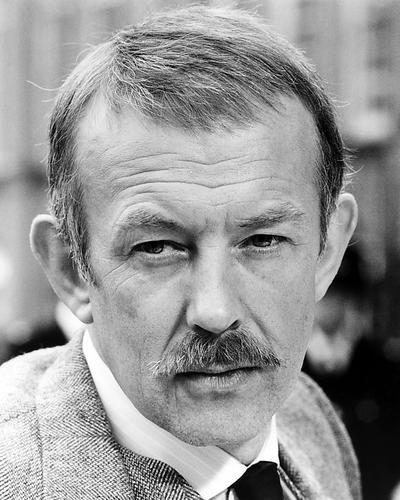
Adam Dalgliesh

- Dr. Phil D'Amato, by Paul Levinson
- Harry D'Amour, by Clive Barker
- Adam Dalgliesh, by P. D. James
- Detective Superintendent Andy Dalziel, Dalziel and Pascoe by Reginald Hill
- Lieutenant Cedric Daniels, The Wire
- Shabor Dasgupta, by Shirshendu Mukhopadhyay
- Lucas Davenport, by John Sandford
- Peter Decker, by Faye Kellerman
- Judge Dee, by Robert van Gulik
- Alex Delaware, by Jonathan Kellerman
- Harry Devlin, by Martin Edwards
- Dick, The Famous Five by Enid Blyton
- Mike Dime, by Barry Fantoni
- Dylan Dog, by Tiziano Sclavi
- Harry Dresden, The Dresden Files by Jim Butcher
- Dan Dunn, by Norman W. Marsh
- Nathaniel Dusk, (DC Comics)
- Darko Dawson, by Kwei Quartey

== E ==
- Eken Babu, by Sujan Dasgupta

== F ==
- Marcus Didius Falco, by Lindsey Davis
- Erast Fandorin, by Boris Akunin
- Dr. Gideon Fell, by John Dickson Carr
- Feluda, by Satyajit Ray
- Detective Don Flack, CSI: NY
- Detective Inspector Malcolm Fox, by Ian Rankin

== G ==
- Detective Sergeant David Gabriel, The Closer
- Inspector Gadget, Inspector Gadget
- Inspector Ghote, by H.R.F. Keating
- Commander George Gideon, by John Creasey
- Pandab Goenda, by Sasthipada Chattopadhyay
- Gogol, by Samaresh Basu
- Gordianus the Finder, by Steven Saylor
- Detective Inspector Alan Grant, by Josephine Tey
- Inspector Gregson, by Sir Arthur Conan Doyle
- Inspector Goole, An Inspector Calls

== H ==
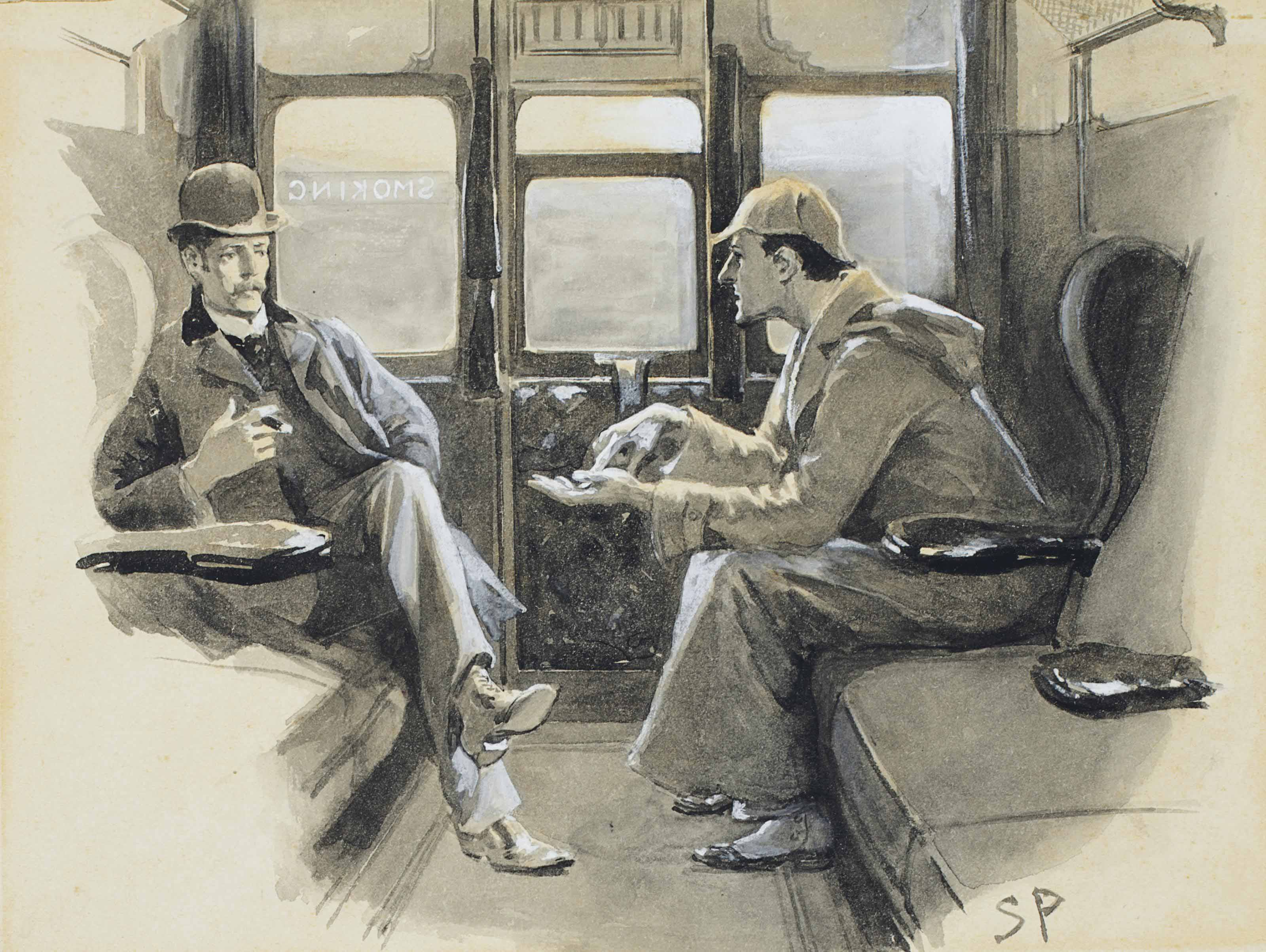
Sherlock Holmes (right) with Dr. Watson

- Healer, played by Ji Chang-wook
- Mike Hammer, by Mickey Spillane
- Hanpei Hattori, Kikaider, by Shotaro Ishinomori
- Heiji Hattori, by Gosho Aoyama
- Hawkshaw, Hawkshaw the Detective
- Wayne Hays, True Detective, by Nic Pizzolato
- Shotaro Hidari, Kamen Rider W
- Ric Hochet, Ric Hochet
- Harry Hole, by Jo Nesbø
- Sherlock Holmes, by Sir Arthur Conan Doyle
- Somerset Holmes, Somerset Holmes
- Aaron Hotchner, BAU unit chief, Criminal Minds

== J ==
- Inspector Mahesh Jadhav, Zapatlela by Mahesh Kothare
- Barnaby Jones, Barnaby Jones
- Athelney Jones, by Sir Arthur Conan Doyle
- Jupiter Jones, Three Investigators by Robert Arthur Jr.
- Gil Jourdan by Gil Jourdan
- Julian, The Famous Five by Enid Blyton

== K ==
- Kyoichiro Kaga, by Keigo Higashino
- Kakababu, by Sunil Gangopadhyay
- Martin Kane, Martin Kane, Private Eye
- Julian Kestrel, by Kate Ross
- Rip Kirby, Rip Kirby
- Nick Knatterton, Nick Knatterton.
- Detective Lieutenant Theo Kojak, Kojak
- Detective Vince Korsak, Rizzoli & Isles
- Shinichi Kudo, Case Closed

== L ==
- L Lawliet, Death Note
- Lew Archer, by Ross Macdonald (name converted to Lew Harper in several films starring Paul Newman).
- Thomas Lynley, by Elizabeth George
- Inspector Lestrade, by Sir Arthur Conan Doyle

== M ==
- Constable Hamish Macbeth, by Marion Chesney
- Detective Vic Mackey, The Shield
- Thomas Magnum, Magnum, P.I.
- Jules Maigret, by Georges Simenon
- Joe Mannix, Mannix
- Philip Marlowe, by Raymond Chandler
- Perry Mason, by Erle Stanley Gardner
- Angus McDonald, The Adventure Zone
- Travis McGee, by John D. MacDonald
- Detective Jimmy McNulty, The Wire
- Sir Henry Merrivale, by Carter Dickson
- Detective Joe Miller, The Expanse
- Prodosh C. Mitter, (aka Feluda) by Satyajit Ray
- Adrian Monk, Monk
- Richard Moore/Kogoro Mori, by Gosho Aoyama
- Derek Morgan, Criminal Minds
- Inspector Morse, by Colin Dexter
- Bhaduri Moshai, by Nirendranath Chakraborty
- FBI Special Agent Fox Mulder, The X-Files
- Bangladesh Counter Intelligence Masud Rana, Masud Rana
- Inspector Juzo Megure, Case Closed
- Detective William Murdoch, Murdoch Mysteries

== N ==
- Sokichi Narumi, Kamen Rider W
- Detective Zack Nichols, Law & Order: Criminal Intent
- Bogey Nicholson, Bogey

== P ==
- Detective Sergeant Peter Pascoe, Dalziel and Pascoe by Reginald Hill
- Max Payne, by Remedy Entertainment
- Hercule Poirot, by Agatha Christie
- Bernard Prince, Bernard Prince
- Detective Lieutenant Louie Provenza, The Closer
- Jake Peralta (Brooklyn Nine-Nine)
- Skulduggery Pleasant, Skulduggery Pleasant by Derek Landy

== Q ==
- Ellery Queen, The Adventures of Ellery Queen

== R ==
- Jack Reacher, by Lee Child
- Detective Danny Reagan, Blue Bloods
- Detective Inspector John Rebus, by Ian Rankin
- Spencer Reid, Criminal Minds
- Arkady Renko, of the Moscow Militsya, by Martin Cruz Smith
- Dave Robicheaux, by James Lee Burke
- Detective Inspector Jack Robinson, Miss Fisher's Murder Mysteries
- Jim Rockford, The Rockford Files
- Lincoln Rhyme, by Jeffery Deaver
- David Rossi, Unit Senior Agent, Criminal Minds
- Kiriti Roy, by Dr. Nihar Ranjan Gupta

== S ==
- Sakkarbaar by Gunvantrai Acharya
- Colonel Niladri Sarkar by Syed Mustafa Siraj
- Willi "Klößchen" Sauerlich, TKKG by Rolf Kalmuczak
- Michael Shayne, by Brett Halliday
- Dan Shepherd, by Stephen Leather
- Sergeant Andy Sipowicz, NYPD Blue
- Sam Spade, by Dashiell Hammett
- Lance Spearman, in African Film magazine
- Doctor Spektor, Doctor Spektor
- Shawn Spencer, Psych
- Spenser, by Robert B. Parker
- Detective Elliot Stabler, Law & Order: Special Victims Unit
- Jesse Stone, by Robert B. Parker
- Nigel Strangeways, by Cecil Day-Lewis
- Professor John Stubbs, by Ruthven Todd
- Detective Matthew Scudder, by Lawrence Block
- Shuichi Saihara, Danganronpa V3: Killing Harmony
- Problem Sleuth, Problem Sleuth

== T ==
- Goenda Tatar, by Sasthipada Chattopadhyay
- Tif, Tif et Tondu
- Tareq, Miss Farah
- Detective Inspector Tom Thorne, by Mark Billingham
- Tondu, Tif et Tondu
- Philip Trent, by E. C. Bentley
- Detective David Tapp, by James Wan and Leigh Whannell

== V ==
- Detective Van Zwam, The Adventures of Nero
- Philo Vance, by S. S. Van Dine
- Nick Valentine, Fallout 4
- Karl "Computer" Vierstein, TKKG by Rolf Kalmuczak

== W ==
- Inspector Kurt Wallander, by Henning Mankell
- Dr. John Watson, by Sir Arthur Conan Doyle
- Chief Inspector Reginald Wexford, by Ruth Rendell
- Lord Peter Wimsey, by Dorothy L. Sayers
- Nero Wolfe, by Rex Stout
- William Murdoch, Murdoch Mysteries

== Y ==
- Inspector Jugo Yokomizo, Detective Conan
- Inspector Sango Yokomizo, Detective Conan
- Inspector Misao Yamamura, Detective Conan

== Z ==
- Inspector Koichi Zenigata, Lupin III, by Monkey Punch

== See also ==
- Crime fiction
- Detective fiction
- Lists of authors
- List of female detective characters
- List of fictional detective teams
- List of mystery writers
- List of thriller authors
- Mystery fiction
- Whodunit
