= List of fictional detectives =

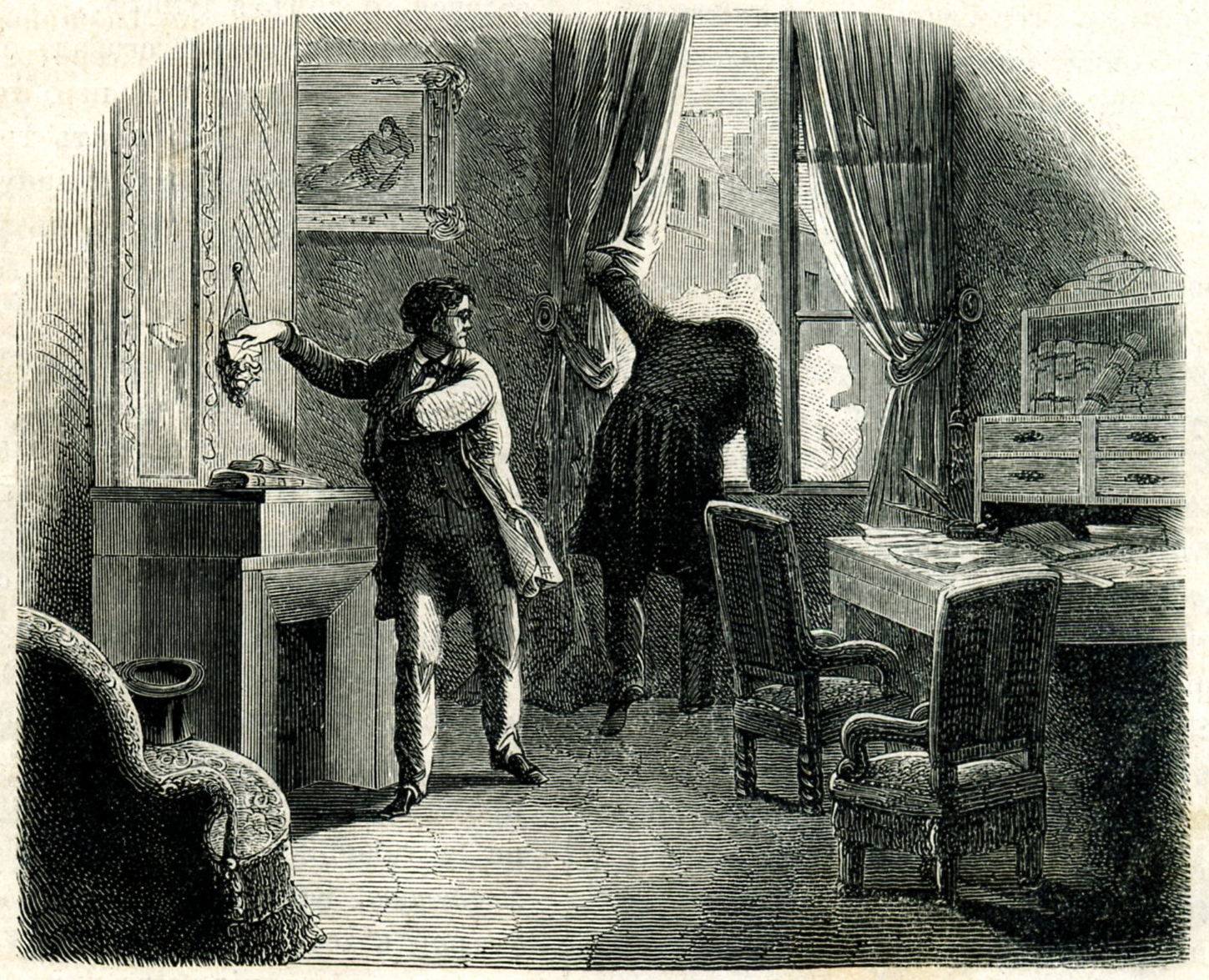
Auguste Dupin

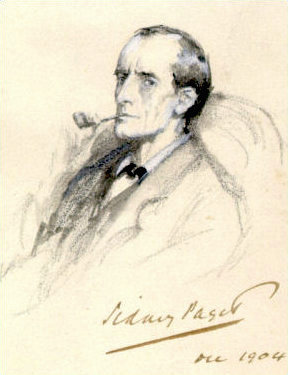
Sherlock Holmes

Fictional detectives are characters in detective fiction. These individuals have long been a staple of detective mystery crime fiction, particularly in detective novels and short stories. Much of early detective fiction was written during the "Golden Age of Detective Fiction" (1920s–1930s). These detectives include amateurs, private investigators and professional policemen. They are often popularized as individual characters rather than parts of the fictional work in which they appear. Stories involving individual detectives are well suited to dramatic presentation, resulting in many popular theatre, television, and film characters.

The first famous detective in fiction was Edgar Allan Poe's C. Auguste Dupin. Later, Sir Arthur Conan Doyle's Sherlock Holmes became the most famous example and remains so to this day. The detectives are often accompanied by a Dr. Watson–like assistant or narrator.

== Types ==
Fictional detectives generally fit one of four archetypes:

- The accomplished amateur detective (Miss Marple, Jessica Fletcher, TinTin, Lord Peter Wimsey); From outside the field of criminal investigation, but gifted with knowledge, curiosity, desire for justice, etc.
- The private investigator (Cordelia, Holmes, Marlowe, Spade, Poirot, Magnum, Millhone, Tommy & Tuppence); Works professionally in criminal and civic investigations, but outside the criminal justice system.
- The police detective (Dalgliesh, Kojak, Lestrade, Morse, Hopkins, Columbo, Craddock, Alleyn, Japp, Maigret, Marriott); Part of an official investigative body, charged with solving crimes.
- The forensic specialist (Scarpetta, Quincy, Cracker, CSI teams, Thorndyke); Affiliated with investigative body, officially tasked with specialized scientific results rather than solving the crime as a whole.

Notable fictional detectives and their creators include:

=== Accomplished amateur detectives ===
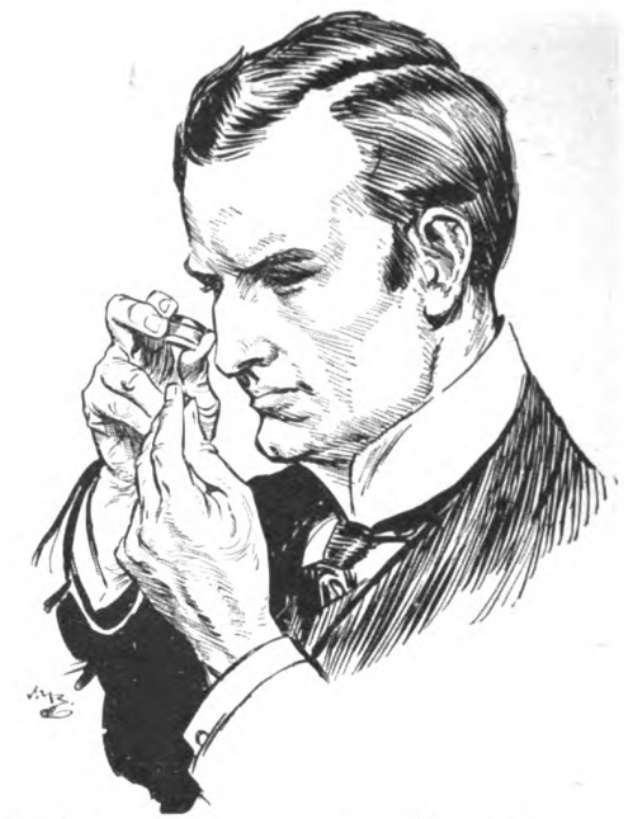
Dr. John Thorndyke as drawn by H. M. Brock in 1908.

- Misir Ali – part-time professor of psychology and academic author at University of Dhaka, created by Humayun Ahmed
- Arjun – young detective from Jalpaiguri in West Bengal, created by Samaresh Majumdar
- P. K. Basu – criminal lawyer, created by Narayan Sanyal
- Trixie Belden – teen detective, created by Julie Campbell Tatham
- Boston Blackie – reformed jewel thief, created by Jack Boyle
- Rosemary Boxer – with Laura Thyme, gardening detective, created by Brian Eastman
- Beatrice Adela Lestrange Bradley – widowed socialite, created by Gladys Mitchell
- Encyclopedia Brown – boy detective Leroy Brown, nicknamed "Encyclopedia" for his intelligence and range of knowledge.
- Father Brown – Catholic priest, created by English novelist G. K. Chesterton. Features in 51 detective short stories.
- Brother Cadfael – early 12th-century monk solves murders and social problems, created by Ellis Peters, also known as Edith Pargeter.
- Jonathan Creek – creative consultant to a magician, in a British TV series by the same name, written by David Renwick.
- Nancy Drew – High school sleuth, created by Edward Stratemeyer.
- C. Auguste Dupin – upper class character created by Edgar Allan Poe. Dupin made his first appearance in Poe's "The Murders in the Rue Morgue" (1841), widely considered the first detective fiction story.
- Dr Gideon Fell – "lexicographer" and drinker, created by John Dickson Carr
- Sister Fidelma – A Celtic nun in the 7th century who solves mysteries, by Peter Berresford Ellis
- The Famous Five - Child detectives and their pet dog created by Enid Blyton.
- Jessica Fletcher – writer, created by William Link and Richard Levinson for Murder, She Wrote TV series (1984–1996)
- Pandab Goenda – team of five child detectives, created by Sasthipada Chattopadhyay
- Gogol – teenage detective, created by Samaresh Basu
- Tin Goyenda-Three teenagers form a team to solve mysteries (inspired from the three investigators series by Robert Arthur Jr.) - created by Rakib Hasan
- Beverly Gray – protagonist of the Beverly Gray Mystery series by Clair Blank
- Myrtle Hardcastle – Victorian girl detective, main character in the Myrtle Hardcastle Mystery novels, created by Elizabeth C. Bunce
- The Hardy Boys – Sibling high school sleuths, (Frank & Joe) created by Edward Stratemeyer.
- Jonathan & Jennifer Hart – millionaire couple, created by Sidney Sheldon
- Three Investigators - An American juvenile detective book series created by Robert Arthur Jr.
- Patrick Jane – con artist, created by Bruno Heller for The Mentalist TV series
- Jagga Jasoos – young detective, created by Anurag Basu for the eponymous film
- Jayanta & Manik – amateur detective duo created by Bengali novelist Hemendra Kumar Roy
- Kakababu – former director of the Archaeological Survey of India, created by Sunil Gangopadhyay
- Al Moghameron Al Khamsa (The Five Adventurers or The Adventurous Five) - child detectives created by Egyptian writer Mahmoud Salem
- Kyoko Kirigiri - a former detective from the game Danganronpa: Trigger Happy Havoc
- Sally Lockhart – teenage girl, created by Philip Pullman
- Miss Marple – a small town old spinster who solves several crimes using common sense, created by Agatha Christie
- Veronica Mars – school girl whose father is a private detective, created by Rob Thomas
- Martin Mystère - an archaeologist and researcher on occult mysteries.
- Amelia Peabody – Egyptologist who solves a variety of dastardly crimes in turn-of-the-century Egypt, created by Elizabeth Peters.
- Ellery Queen – author and editor of a magazine, created by two writers, using the pseudonym Ellery Queen
- Easy Rawlins – black WWII veteran from Houston. All stories take place in Los Angeles during the 50s and 60s. Created by Walter Mosley.
- Joseph Rouletabille – journalist created by French writer Gaston Leroux. Main character in The Mystery of the Yellow Room.
- Shuichi Saihara - main detective and second protagonist in Danganronpa V3: Killing Harmony
- Niladri Sarkar – retired colonel, naturist and amateur investigator, created by Bengali writer Syed Mustafa Siraj
- Kiyoshi Shimada - a Buddhist priest who excels at solving mysteries, created by Yukito Ayatsuji. Shimada first appeared in Ayatsuji's debut novel The Decagon House Murders (1987), part of his Bizarre House/Mansion Murders series. The first two volumes of the series have been translated into English by Locked Room International.
- Dr. John Thorndyke – medical doctor who trained to become a forensic specialist, created by R. Austin Freeman
- Laura Thyme – with Rosemary Boxer, gardening detective, created by Brian Eastman
- TinTin – Reporter and adventurer who travels the world with a white dog named Snowy, created by Hergé
- Philip Trent – gentleman sleuth, created by E. C. Bentley
- Professor Augustus S. F. X. Van Dusen – created by Jacques Futrelle
- Hetty Wainthropp – retired working-class woman, created by David Cook
- Lord Peter Wimsey – wealthy English gentleman, created by Dorothy L. Sayers, stories continued by Jill Paton Walsh. Assisted by Mervyn Bunter, his valet and former batman from WW1, and later by Harriet Vane
- Hildegarde Withers- a New York City schoolteacher turned amateur sleuth created by Stuart Palmer

=== Private investigators ===
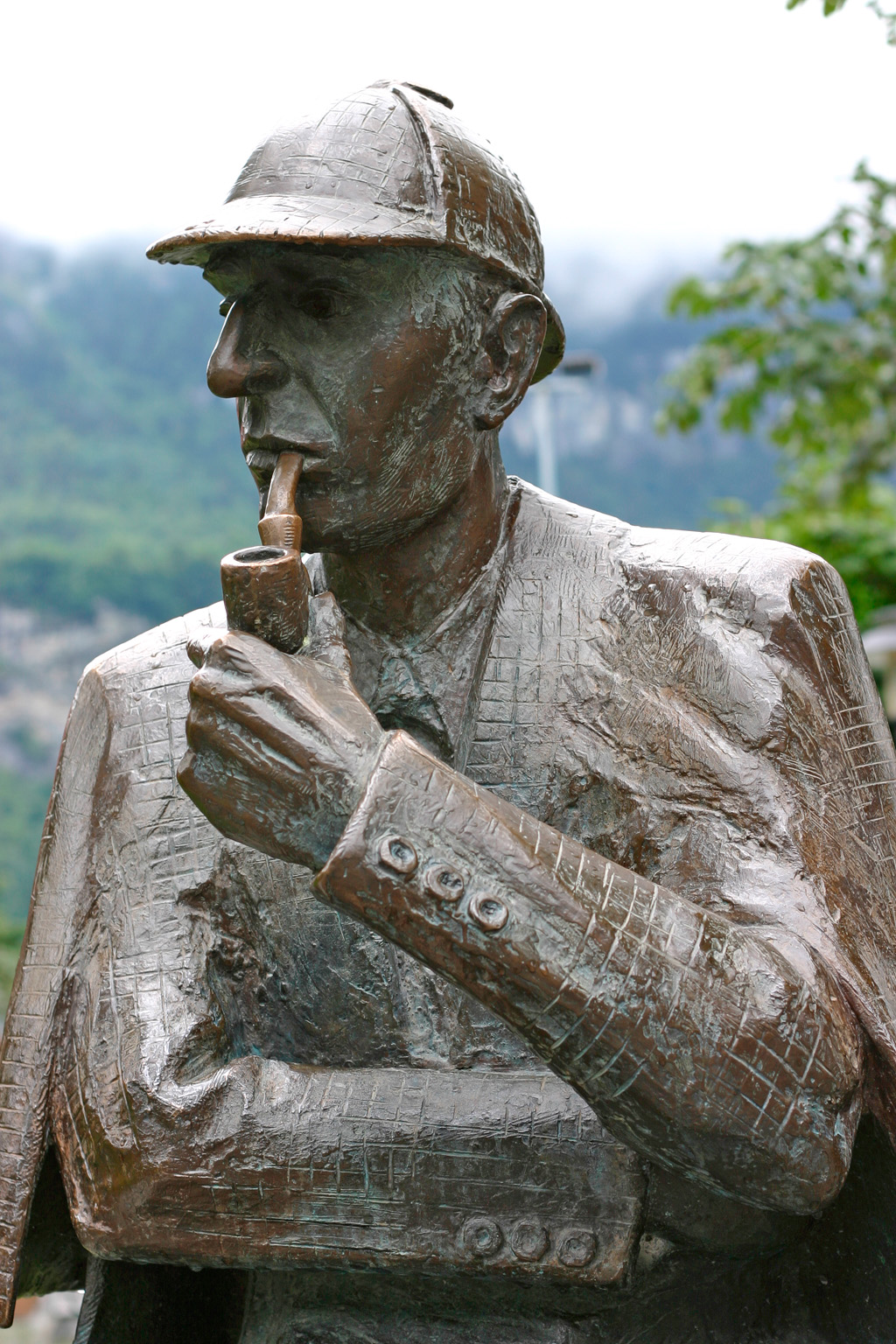
Sherlock Holmes has become an icon of a detective. The term "Sherlock" is also used to refer to a detective.

- David Addison in Moonlighting – created by Glenn Gordon Caron
- Angel (Buffy the Vampire Slayer) – Vampire with a soul and private investigator in Los Angeles
- Byomkesh Bakshi – created by Sharadindu Bandyopadhyay
- Goenda Baradacharan – created by Shirshendu Mukhopadhyay
- Parashor Barma – created by Premendra Mitra
- Batman – World's Greatest Detective in the DC Universe – created by Bob Kane and Bill Finger
- Tommy and Tuppence Beresford – created by Agatha Christie
- Sexton Blake - created by Harry Blyth
- Benoit Blanc - created by Rian Johnson
- Jackson Brodie – created by Kate Atkinson
- Nestor Burma – created by Léo Malet
- Albert Campion – created by Margery Allingham
- Pepe Carvalho – created by Manuel Vázquez Montalbán
- Richard Castle – A successful novelist and private investigator from the ABC television series Castle
- Nick & Nora Charles – created by Dashiell Hammett
- Dipak Chatterjee – created by Swapan Kumar
- Elvis Cole – created by Robert Crais
- Dylan Dog - a private investigator of supernatural crimes.
- Bulldog Drummond – created by H. C. McNeile
- Feluda – created by Satyajit Ray
- Phryne Fisher – created by Kerry Greenwood
- Ganesh – created by Sujatha
- Garrett – created by Glen Cook
- Dirk Gently (Svlad Cjelli) - created by Douglas Adams
- Cordelia Gray – private detective in London, created by P. D. James
- Peter Gunn – created by Blake Edwards
- Mike Hammer – created by Mickey Spillane
- Dixon Hawke - created for D. C. Thomson
- Madelyn "Maddie" Hayes in Moonlighting – created by Glenn Gordon Caron
- Sherlock Holmes – created by Sir Arthur Conan Doyle
- Matt Houston – created by Lawrence Gordon
- Jack Irish – created by Peter Temple
- Robert T. Ironside – Handicapped police consultant, former police detective. Created by Collier Young, and played by Raymond Burr
- Jessica Jones - created by Brian Michael Bendis and Michael Gaydos
- Jake Lassiter – created by Paul Levine
- Nelson Lee - created by John William Staniforth
- Bernie Little – in the Chet and Bernie Mystery Series, created by Spencer Quinn
- L. Lawliet – created by Tsugumi Ohba and Takeshi Obata
- Thomas Magnum – created by Donald P. Bellisario for Magnum, P.I. TV series
- Joe Mannix – created by Richard Levinson and William Link for Mannix TV series
- Philip Marlowe – created by Raymond Chandler
- Mitin Masi – created by Suchitra Bhattacharya
- Kinsey Millhone – created by Sue Grafton for her "alphabet mysteries" series of novels.
- Tess Monaghan, created by Laura Lippman
- Adrian Monk – created by Andy Breckman for Monk TV series
- Kogoro Mori, created by Gosho Aoyama
- Bhaduri Moshai – created by Nirendranath Chakraborty
- Hercule Poirot – created by Agatha Christie
- Precious Ramotswe – created by Alexander McCall Smith
- Jeff Randall – created by Dennis Spooner for Randall and Hopkirk (Deceased) TV series
- Jim Rockford – created by Roy Huggins and Stephen J. Cannell for The Rockford Files TV series
- Kiriti Roy – created by Indian dermatologist and popular Bengali novelist Nihar Ranjan Gupta
- John Shaft – created by Ernest Tidyman
- Sam Spade – created by Dashiell Hammett
- Shawn Spencer and Burton Guster – created by Steve Franks for Psych TV series
- Spenser – created by Robert B. Parker
- Remington Steele – created by Robert Butler, Michael Gleason for Remington Steele TV series
- Jake Styles – created by Dean Hargrove and Joel Steiger for Jake and the Fatman TV series
- Cormoran Strike – created by Robert Galbraith (a pen name of J.K. Rowling)
- Jack Taylor - based on Ken Bruen's crime-drama books; an Irish ex-cop as a maverick private investigator
- The Continental Op – created by Dashiell Hammett
- Philo Vance – created by S. S. Van Dine
- V. I. Warshawski – created by Sara Paretsky
- Nero Wolfe – created by Rex Stout
- Ace Ventura - created by Jack Bernstein
- Karamchand - created by Anil Chaudhary

=== Police detectives ===
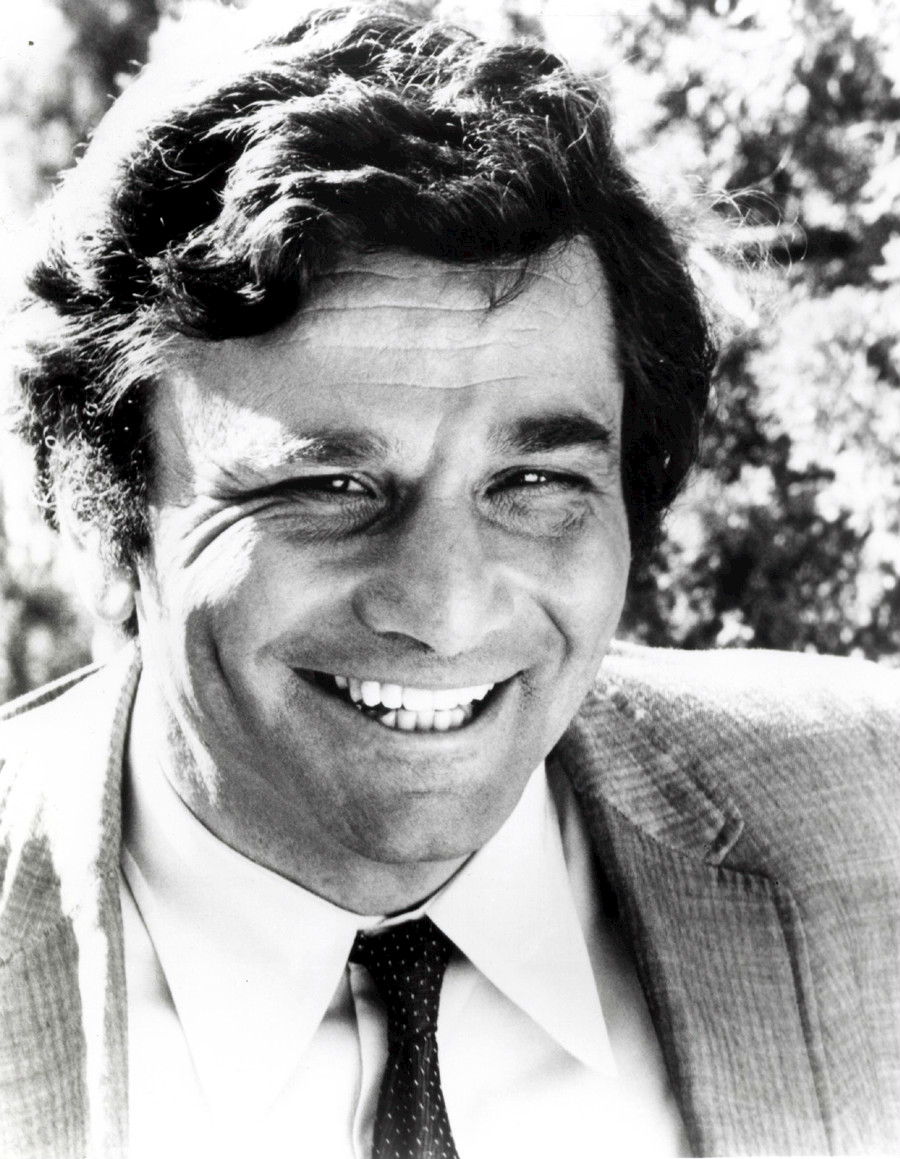
Columbo is often considered to be one of the greatest original TV detectives.

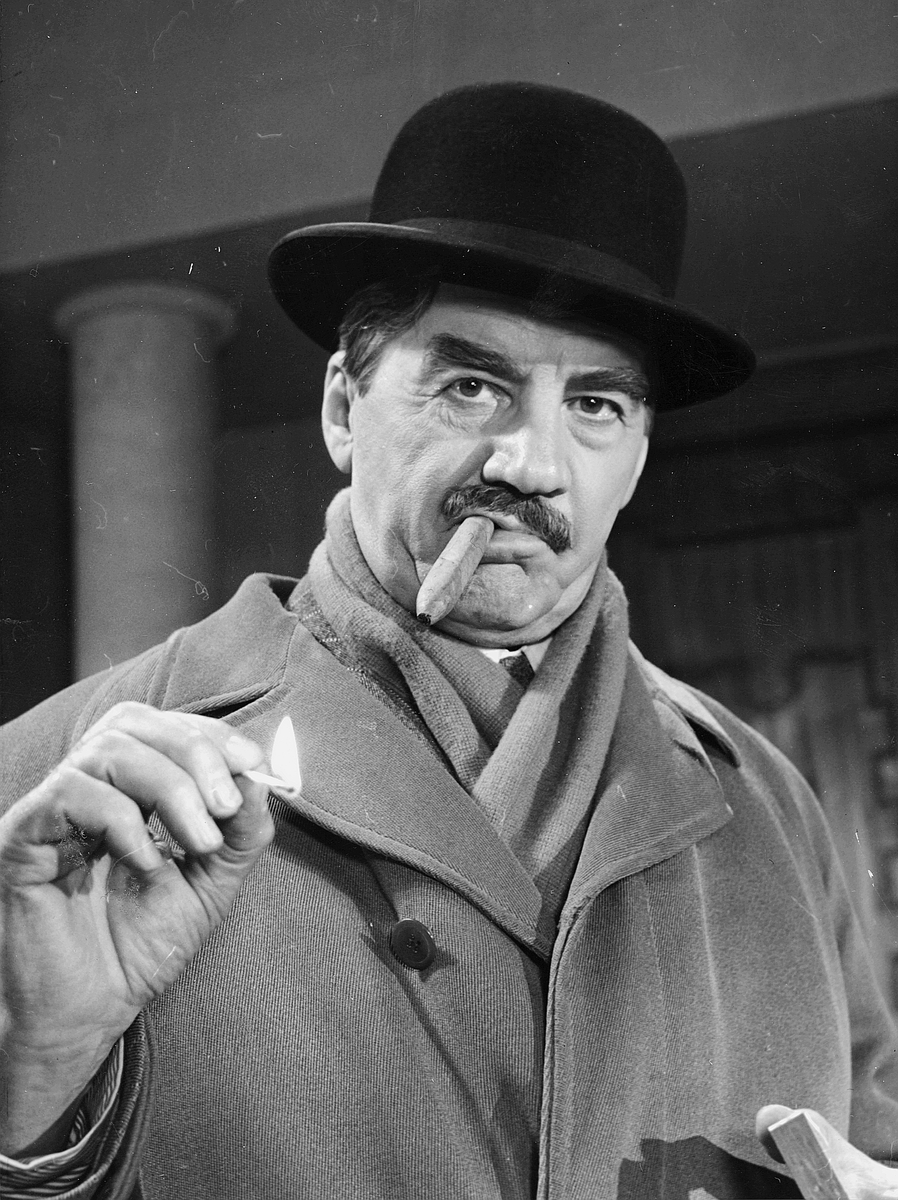
Inspector Frans J. Palmu, played by Joel Rinne.

- Inspector Roderick Alleyn – created by Ngaio Marsh
- Sgt. Suzanne "Pepper" Anderson – from the television series Police Woman, created by Robert L. Collins, played by Angie Dickinson
- 87th Precinct detectives – created by Ed McBain
- Inspector Alan Banks – created by Peter Robinson
- Superintendent Battle – created by Agatha Christie
- Napoleon "Bony" Bonaparte – created by Arthur Upfield
- Harry Bosch – created by Michael Connelly
- Inspector Nash Bridges from Nash Bridges (1996 to 2001), played by Don Johnson – created by Carlton Cuse
- Charlie Chan – created by Earl Derr Biggers
- Inspector Clouseau – from the Pink Panther franchise
- Columbo – from the American TV series Columbo, created by William Link and Richard Levinson
- Sergeant Cork – created by Ted Willis
- James "Sonny" Crockett – created by Anthony Yerkovich, played by Don Johnson (1984 to 1990) and Colin Farrell (2006) in Miami Vice
- Alex Cross – created by James Patterson
- Inspector Adam Dalgliesh – created by P. D. James
- Shabor Dasgupta – created by Shirshendu Mukhopadhyay
- Judge Dee – 8th century Chinese fictionalized magistrate with later editions by Robert van Gulik
- Popeye Doyle – created by Robin Moore, based on the real detective Eddie Egan
- Harrier "Harry" Du Bois - created by Robert Kurvitz for the video game Disco Elysium. Chosen name may vary depending on the player's choices.
- Inspector French (Joseph French) – created by Freeman Wills Crofts
- Inspector Frost – created by R. D. Wingfield
- D.C.S. Christopher Foyle – from the British TV series Foyle's War, created by Anthony Horowitz
- Chief Inspector Armand Gamache – created by Louise Penny
- Inspector Alan Grant – created by Josephine Tey
- Inspector Japp – created by Agatha Christie
- Richard Jury – created by mystery author Martha Grimes
- Lt. Theo Kojak – TV series (played by Telly Savalas)
- Duca Lamberti – created by Giorgio Scerbanenco, becomes a police in the second novel of the Milano Quartet
- Christie Love - fictional New York City police detective from TV movie and series Get Christie Love!
- Inspector Lestrade – created by Sir Arthur Conan Doyle
- Judge Bao – Chinese judge and investigator
- Chief Inspector Robert Macdonald – created by E.C.R. Lorac
- Jules Maigret – created by Georges Simenon
- Steve McGarrett – Hawaii Five-O TV series
- Adrian Monk – created by Andy Breckman and David Hoberman
- Salvo Montalbano – Italian police commissioner created by Andrea Camilleri
- Inspector Morse – created by Colin Dexter
- Detective Chief Inspector Endeavour Morse – created by Colin Dexter, played by John Thaw in Inspector Morse (1987 to 2000, original series), and by Shaun Evans in Endeavour (2012 to 2023, prequel series)
- Detective William Murdoch – created by Maureen Jennings
- Furuhata Ninzaburō – created by Kōki Mitani, a Japanese version of Columbo
- Inspector Palmu – created by Mika Waltari
- Jake Peralta (from Brooklyn Nine-Nine) – created by Dan Goor and Michael Schur
- Inspector Walter Purbright – created by Colin Watson
- Inspector Rebus – created by Ian Rankin
- Dave Robicheaux – created by James Lee Burke
- Inspector Simon Serrailler – created by Susan Hill
- Detective Inspector Luke Thanet – created by Dorothy Simpson
- Thomson and Thompson – from The Adventures of Tintin, created by Hergé
- Dick Tracy – created by Chester Gould
- Inspector Wallander – created by Henning Mankell

=== Forensic specialists ===
- Siri Paiboun - Dr. Siri Paiboun Mysteries - novels created by Colin Cotterill
- Temperance Brennan – Bones TV series based on the books by Kathy Reichs
- Donald "Ducky" Mallard – NCIS TV series
- Dexter Morgan – Dexter TV series
- Henry Morgan – Forever TV series immortal medical examiner and private investigator
- Dr. Lancelot Priestly – created by John Rhode
- Dr. R. Quincy – Quincy, M.E. TV series
- Lincoln Rhyme and Amelia Sachs – created by Jeffery Deaver
- Elizabeth Rodgers – Law & Order TV series
- Dr. Kay Scarpetta – created by Patricia Cornwell
- Abby Sciuto – NCIS TV series
- Dr. John Thorndyke – created by R. Austin Freeman
- Bruce Wayne – Batman comics and adaptations
- Barry Allen – Flash comics and adaptations

==== CSI: Crime Scene Investigation TV shows ====
- Stella Bonasera – CSI: NY TV series
- Horatio Caine – CSI: Miami TV series
- Jo Danville – CSI: NY TV series
- Calleigh Duquesne – CSI: Miami TV series
- Gil Grissom – CSI: Crime Scene Investigation TV series
- Raymond Langston – CSI: Crime Scene Investigation TV series
- D. B. Russell – CSI: Crime Scene Investigation TV series
- Mac Taylor – CSI: NY TV series
- Catherine Willows – CSI: Crime Scene Investigation TV series

== Anime and manga ==
- Akechi Anna and Kobayashi Mikuru – protagonists of Toei Animation's series Star Detective Precure, which is known in Japan as Meitantei Precure.
- Koichi Zenigata – character in Lupin III, by Monkey Punch. Arch rival to the main protagonist Lupin.
- Hajime Kindaichi – character from the manga and anime series Kindaichi Case Files.
- Shinichi Kudo/Conan Edogawa – protagonist of Gosho Aoyama's series Case Closed, which is known in Japan as Meitantei Conan.
- L – a detective featured in the Death Note series created by Tsugumi Ohba and Takeshi Obata
- Alice – protagonist of Kamisama no memochou, a NEET detective.
- Sou Touma – main character of the Q.E.D. series created and produced by Motohiro Katou.
- Heinrich Lunge - a detective in the Monster series by Naoki Urasawa
- Kyoko Kirigiri – character in Danganronpa: Trigger Happy Havoc. Initially started off as "Ultimate ???", and later revealed as the "Ultimate Detective".
- Shuichi Saihara – character in Danganronpa V3: Killing Harmony known as the 'Ultimate Detective".
- Naoto Shirogane – character in Persona 4 and the Detective Prince, who has a 200 level IQ, yet is lonely and insecure regarding her age and gender. Her weapon of choice is a handgun, mainly a revolver.
- Goro Akechi – character in Persona 5. He is a detective known as the Second Advent of the Detective Prince, serving as a rival to protagonist Joker and the Phantom Thieves of Hearts. Though charismatic, he is lonely and seeks attention. As a member of the Phantom Thieves, he is known as "Crow", also known as the Black Mask, and wields various weapons. The Phantom Thieves begin to suspect that he knows of the Metaverse after he overhears Morgana talking about pancakes, which he would only be able to do if he had been to the Metaverse. He is voiced by Robbie Daymond.
- Dick Gumshoe – character from the manga and video game series Ace Attorney.
- Grévil de Blois - inspector working in Sauville's police department. Featured in the novel series Gosick created by Kazuki Sakuraba.
- Siesta - character from the Light Novel and anime series The Detective Is Already Dead.
- Sakaido - character from the original anime series Id – Invaded directed by Ei Aoki and written by Ōtarō Maijō. The anime also received a manga sequel.
- Armed Detective Agency - an organization from the anime and manga series Bungou Stray Dogs, the most notable member being Edogawa Ranpo.
- Kyouko Okitegami - protagonist of Nisio Isin's novel series Bōkyaku Tantei. She is a famous detective who finishes all her cases in one day, because she resets her memory every time she goes to sleep.

== See also ==
- Crime fiction
- List of male detective characters
- List of female detective characters
- List of fictional historical detectives
- List of fictional detective teams
- List of fictional science fiction and fantasy detectives
- Spy film
