= List of fictional detective teams =

This is a list of fictional detective teams from popular detective fiction. This list includes pairs or groups of characters who appear in a series of novels or short stories, not characters who are teamed only for a single story.

Where two detectives work together, they are listed as A and B; where a single detective is regularly accompanied by a non-detecting sidekick or chronicler they are listed as A with B. The author who created the team appears in parentheses.

Detective Duos:

- Anabel and Looker – (Game Freak)
- Author Bryant and John May – (Christopher Fowler)
- Cagney & Lacey - (Barbara Avedon and Barbara Corday)
- Cool and Lam – (Erle Stanley Gardner as A. A. Fair)
- Dalziel and Pascoe – (Reginald Hill)
- Detective Pikachu/Harry Goodman and Tim Goodman – (Dan Hernandez, Benji Samit, Rob Letterman, Derek Connolly)
- Frank and Joe Hardy – (Franklin W. Dixon)
- Grijpstra and de Gier – (Janwillem van de Wetering)
- Hawk and Fisher – (Simon Green)
- Janet Scott and Rachel Bailey – (Sally Wainwright)
- Jayanta and Manik – (Hemendra Kumar Roy)
- Lord Darcy and Sean O'Lochlainn – (Randall Garrett)
- Morse and Robert Lewis – (Colin Dexter)
- Nero Wolfe and Archie Goodwin – (Rex Stout)
- Nick and Nora Charles – (Dashiell Hammett)
- Nick Wilde and Judy Hops – (Clark Spencer)
- Richard Poole and Camille Bordey – (Robert Thorogood)
- Shawn Spencer and Burton Guster – (Steve Franks)
- Solomon and Lord – (Paul Levine)
- Thomson and Thompson – (Georges Prosper Remi as Hergé)
- Tommy and Tuppence Beresford – (Agatha Christie)
- Travis McGee and Meyer – (John D. MacDonald)
- Waxillium Ladrian and Wayne – (Brandon Sanderson)

Detective with X Duos:

- Adrian Monk with Natalie Teeger – (Andy Breckman)
- Arjun with Amal Shome – (Samaresh Majumdar)
- Byomkesh Bakshi with Ajit Banerjee – (Sharadindu Bandyopadhyay)
- Columbo with Dog – (Richard Levinson and William Link)
- Dipak Chatterjee with Ratanlal – (Swapan Kumar)
- Elijah Baley with R. Daneel Olivaw – (Isaac Asimov)
- Feluda with Topshe – (Satyajit Ray)
- Hercule Poirot with Arthur Hastings – (Agatha Christie)
- Hildegarde Withers with Inspector Oscar Piper – (Stuart Palmer)
- Inspector Lynley with Sergeant Havers – (Elizabeth George)
- Kakababu with Sontu – (Sunil Gangopadhyay)
- Kate Beckett with Richard Castle – (Andrew W. Marlowe)
- Kiriti Roy with Subrata Roy – (Nihar Ranjan Gupta)
- Martin Beck with Gunvald Larsson – (Sjöwall and Wahlöö)
- Master Li with Number Ten Ox – (Barry Hughart)
- Michael Knight with KITT – (Glen A. Larson)
- Mitin Masi with Tupur – (Suchitra Bhattacharya)
- Niladri Sarkar with Jayanta – (Syed Mustafa Siraj)
- Parashor Barma with Krittibas Bhadra – (Premendra Mitra)
- Phoenix Wright with Maya Fey – (Shu Takumi)
- Shabor Dasgupta with Nanda – (Shirshendu Mukhopadhyay)
- Sherlock Holmes with Dr. John H. Watson – (Sir Arthur Conan Doyle)
- Sister Fidelma with Brother Eadulf – (Peter Tremayne)

Detective Groups:

- Armed Detective Agency – (Kafka Asagiri)
- Detective Boys – (Gosho Aoyama)
- Mystery Incorporated – (Hanna-Barbera)
