= Shri Swapankumarer Badami Hyenar Kobole =

2023 Bengali thriller film

- Theatrical release poster
- Directed by: Debaloy Bhattacharya
- Starring: Abir Chatterjee; Paran Bandopadhyay; Goutam Halder
- Cinematography: Ramyadeep Saha
- Edited by: Sanglap Bhowmick
- Music by: Amit Chatterjee
- Production company: Hoichoi Studios
- Distributed by: Shree Venkatesh Films
- Release date: 12 January 2024
- Country: India
- Language: Bengali

Shri Swapankumarer Badami Hyenar Kobole (Bengali pronunciation: [ʃri ʃɔponkumarer badami hyenar kobole]) is a 2024 Indian Bengali-language black comedy action thriller film directed by Debaloy Bhattacharya, and produced by Hoichoi Studios. It is based on the adventures of Dipak Chatterjee, a fictional detective lost in time. The movie released to positive reviews from the critics.

== Synopsis ==
Kolkata faces danger from a malevolent force, Badami Hyena. Dipak Chatterjee, a detective character created by pulp-fiction writer Shri Swapankumar, comes out to save the city. But Swapankumar soon puts Dipak's fate in the balance with the story he develops around him.

== Cast ==
- Abir Chatterjee as Dipak Chatterjee
- Paran Bandopadhyay as Sri Swapankumar
- Shruti Das as Tashi
- Goutam Halder as Bajpakhi
- Pratik Dutta as Ratanlal
- Loknath Dey
- Saoli Chattopadhyay
- Sushmita Roy

== Reception ==
=== Critical reception ===
Agnivo Niyogi of The Telegraph wrote "Abir successfully deconstructs his conventional image to portray a beaten, has-been detective." He also praised the witty dialogues, CGI, colour scheme and the musical score, which keep the audience hooked with the film. Poorna Banerjee of Times of India rated the film 3.5 out of 5 stars and wrote that although the movie has a long runtime and the first half feels a bit slow, the story picks pace in the second half. She praised the director for keeping alive the utter lack of logic and surrealism in the storyline, while bringing to life characters the audience can connect to. Anandabazar Patrika also reviewed the film 7 out of 10 stars and said that this movie resolves the lack of Bengali culture in movies.

Shamayita Ckaraborty of OttPlay rated the film 3.5 out of 5 stars and wrote "It is pulp fiction and in signature 'ki-hoite-ki-hoiya-gelo' moments, the writers throw all the logical elements up in the air". She also mentioned that the envious music, performance of the whole cast and some unforgettable shots makes the movie a good watch. Times Now rated the film 3 out of 5 stars and mentioned that the resurrection of pulp fiction, the interaction between Deepak and Swapan Kumar successfully captures the nostalgia of 50s literature fiction. Souvik Saha of Cine Kolkata rated the film 3 out of 5 stars praising the performances of the cast, skillful direction and well executed plot twists accompanied with the background score. Sangbad Pratidin, Ei Samay and Bongo Banjo also reviewed the movie on a positive note. They praised the unique presentation of Abir as a detective, Paran's acting and the director's visionary mettle.
