= TKKG (2019 film) =

2019 film directed by Robert Thalheim

- Theatrical release poster
- Directed by: Robert Thalheim
- Screenplay by: Peer Klehmet
- Based on: TKKG by Rolf Kalmuczak
- Produced by: Andreas Banz; Dirk G. Engelhardt; Justus Riesenkampff; Matthias Miegel; Peer Klehmet; Robert Thalheim
- Starring: Ilyes Moutaoukkil; Lorenzo Germeno; Manuel Santos Gelke; Emma-Louise Schimpf
- Cinematography: Henner Besuch
- Edited by: Stefan Kobe
- Music by: Anton Feist; Uwe Bossenz
- Production companies: Kundschafter Filmproduktion; Delta Film; Warner Bros. Film Productions Germany
- Distributed by: Warner Bros. Pictures
- Release date: 6 June 2019
- Country: Germany
- Language: German
- Box office: $823,170

TKKG, also known as Detective Agency TKKG, is a 2019 German children's film directed by Robert Thalheim, based on the book series by Rolf Kalmuczak.

== Plot ==
When Willi's father is abducted and is only released for a valuable statue from his art collection, Tim is the only one who believes Willi that the police are on the wrong track. Together with the smart policeman's daughter Gaby and the highly intelligent outsider Karl, they start to investigate on their own. Against all odds the four discover a conspiracy. In the course of their first big detective adventure they grow together into a committed community, and so Tim, Klöschen, Karl and Gaby become the band TKKG.

== Cast ==
- Ilyes Moutaoukkil as Peter Timotheus „Tim“ Carsten
- Lorenzo Germeno as Willi bzw. Wilhelm „Klößchen“ Sauerlich
- Manuel Santos Gelke as Karl Vierstein
- Emma-Louise Schimpf as Gabriele „Gaby“ Glockner
- Trystan Pütter as Kriminalkommissar Emil Glockner
- Tom Schilling as Lehrer Pauling
- Antoine Monot, Jr. as Hermann Sauerlich
- Laura Tonke as Erna Sauerlich
- Samuel Schneider as Georg
- Milan Peschel as Raimundo / Otto Biersack
- Mai Duong Kieu as Amanda
- Maryam Zaree as Susanne Carsten
- Phil Laude as Inspektor Bienert
- Dag-Alexis Kopplin as Polizist
