= Pandab Goenda (TV series) =

Indian television detective series

- Genre: Drama; Detective; Crime
- Created by: Mohabahu Motion Pictures
- Based on: Pandab Goenda
- Written by: Sasthipada Chattopadhyay
- Screenplay by: Sarbari Ghoshal; Srabasti Basu
- Story by: Sadeep Bhattacharya; Dialogues; Poushali Ghoshdastidar
- Directed by: Shamik Bose; Rahul Mukhopadhayay
- Starring: Rob Dey; Rishav Chakraborty; Mayukh Chatterjee; Anumita Dutta; Shritama Mitra
- Theme music composer: Srijato and Indradeep Dasgupta
- Country of origin: India
- Original language: Bengali
- No. of seasons: 1
- No. of episodes: 159

Production
- Executive producers: Sromona Ghosh; Sonakshi Mukherjee; Samrat Das
- Producers: Shibaji Panja; Bulbuli
- Production location: Kolkata
- Cinematography: Madhura Palit; Pankaj Maity
- Running time: 22 minutes
- Production company: Mohabahu Motion Pictures

Original release
- Network: Zee Bangla
- Release: 7 September 2020 – 15 April 2021

Related
- Mangalmoyee Santoshi Maa; Joy Baba Loknath

Pandab Goenda is an Indian Bengali-language television detective series that premiered on 7 September 2020, and aired on Zee Bangla. The show based on the story of Pandab Goenda, starred Rob Dey, Rishav Chakraborty, Mayukh Chatterjee, Anumita Dutta and Shritama Mitra.

== List of Stories ==
- 1. Mittirder Baganbari Rohoshyo
- 2. Brishtimukhor Sondhya
- 3. Chhintai Kando
- 4. Bhalluk Rohoshyo
- 5. Chainik Chokro
- 6. Lalbai er Guptodhan
- 7. Bhairab Halder Porbo
- 8. Goyna Churi Rohoshyo
- 9. Vinayak Roy Mrityu Rohoshyo
- 10. Chhota Thakur Porbo
- 11. Rajib porbo
- 12. Abhimanyu Uddhar o Meghnad Badh Porbo
- 13. Oshotodhatur Murti Churi Rohoshyo
- 14. Nari Pachar Chokro

== Cast ==
=== Main ===
- Rob Dey as Bablu a.k.a. Anirban Sen. (Leader of Pandab Goyenda)
- Rishav Chakraborty as Bilu a.k.a. Akaash Dutta.
- Anumita Dutta as Bachchu a.k.a. Tridha Chatterjee.
- Shritama Mitra as Bichchu a.k.a. Tirthaa Chatterjee.
- Mayukh Chatterjee as Bhombol a.k.a. Snehajit Das.

=== Family of Pandab Goenda ===
- Ranjini Chattopadhyay as Swarnali Sen: Bablu's mother; Abhimanyu's wife.
- Anindya Chakrabarti / Rajib Banerjee as ACP Abhimanyu Sen: Bablu's Father; Swarnali's husband,.
- Abanti Dutta as Sucharita Chatterjee: Bachchu and Bichchhu's mother; Arunava's wife.
- Arghya Mukherjee as Arunava Chatterjee: Bachchu and Bichchhu's father; Sucharita's husband.
- Kalyani Mondal as Pishithamma: Bachchu and Bichchhu's paternal grandmother; Arunava's paternal aunt.
- Aparajita Ghosh as Brishti Dutta : Bilu's mother; Subinoy's wife.
- Avijit Sengupta as Subinoy Dutta: Bilu's father; Brishti's husband.
- Moumita Chakraborty as Shiulee Das: Bhombol's mother; Malay's wife.
- Debashis Nath as Malay Das: Bhombol's father; Shiulee's husband.

=== Recurring ===
- Samrat Mukherjee as Meghnad Malpani a.k.a. MM a.k.a. Satya Maharaaj (Fake Identity).
- Saugata Bandyopadhyay as Inspector Kunal Basu.
- Oliva Bhattacharya as Officer Saheli Sarkar.
- Rahul Chakrabarty as DCP Asim Ray: Arunava's friend.
- Hiya Roy as Rai Dasgupta: Daughter of scientist Pranabesh Dasgupta, Bilu's love interest.
- Sudip Sarkar as Dr.Shikdar: RMO of Metropolitan Hospital; MM's employee.
- Sandip Dey as Chiranjib Shikdar: a corrupt politician, MM's employee
- Phalguni Chatterjee as Tekchand Ganguly a.k.a. Tekdadu.
- Arindol Bagchi as Paban: MM's employee.
- Rumki Chatterjee as Swapna Ray a.k.a. Raykakima.
- Sankar Chakraborty as Niloy Das: Bhombol's uncle, Moloy's younger brother.
- Bhola Tamang as the Chinese Man at Shahjahan Chinese Hotel.
- Manojit Bappa as Sanjay: Arunava's Cousin, Piyali's husband.
- Ritoja Majumder as Piyali: Sanjay's wife.
- Bulbuli Choubey Panja as Farzana Begum / Madhumita Paul (Fake Identity): Tatai's mother.
- Avijit Sarkar as Bhairab Halder.
- Anaya Ghosh as Sampa Halder: Bhairab's wife.
- Arup Roy as Trinath Halder: Bhairab's younger brother.
- Srija Bhattacharjee as Riya Halder: Bhairab and Sampa's daughter.
- Aishwarya Sen as Kankana Sarkar a.k.a. Muniya: Bablu's (Pandab Goenda) childhood friend; Amiya's daughter; Sudeshna's step daughter; Bulan's elder step sister.
- Abhyuday Dey as Bulan: Muniya's step brother; Amiya and Sudeshna's son.
- Shaktipada Dey as Amiya Sarkar: Munia and Bulan's father; Sudeshna's husband.
- Rumpa Chatterjee as Sudeshna Sarkar: Bulan's mother, Munia's stepmother; Amiya's second wife.
- Jasmine Roy as Disha.
- Gourab Mondal as Ayan Mitra a.k.a. Ayan Kumar.
- Juhi Sengupta as Madhushree Roy: Vinayak's wife.
- Sidhu as Vinayak Roy: The director; Madhushree's husband.
- Abhijit Guha as Pulak Bose: Vinayak's person secretary.
- Rajat Malakar as Chota Thakur.
- Sutirtha Saha as Rajib: MM's former employee; Pallavi's love interest.
- Tanushree Bhattacharya as Pallavi: Rajib's love interest.
- Gopa Nandi as Mita Sarkar (Ñee Das): Bhombol's paternal aunt; Malay's younger sister.
- Avijit Dev Roy as Rabi Sarkar: Mita's husband.
- Atreyi Bose as Shrishti: Mita and Rabi's daughter
- Biswajit Ghosh Majumder as Goutam: Tara's husband.
- Anindita Saha Kapileshwari as Rajeshwari Ray.
- Prapti Chatterjee as Parna
