= Aleek Manush =

Bengali novel by Syed Mustafa Siraj

- Author: Syed Mustafa Siraj
- Language: Bengali
- Publisher: Dey's Publishing
- Publication date: 1988
- Publication place: India
- Award: Sahitya Akademi Award

Aleek Manush (transl. Mythical Man) is a Bengali novel by Syed Mustafa Siraj, first published in 1988. Set in rural Murshidabad, it follows a Farazi preacher and his son, who rejects religious orthodoxy. The novel explores identity, dissent, and transformation within Muslim communities amid political unrest, spiritual tension, and anti-colonial struggle from the late 19th century to post-independence India. Written in a lyrical, albeit grounded prose style, it shows how metaphysics and politics shape everyday village life. It is also lauded as an excellent work of magic realism.

The novel received the Sahitya Akademi Award in 1994.
