= Goenda Tatar =

Fictional detective

Goenda Tatar is a fictional detective character created by Bengali novelist Sasthipada Chattopadhyay. Chattopadhyay wrote a number of stories of Goenda Tatar series.

== Characters ==
Tatar is an adventurous school going kid who love to solve mysteries with his two friends, Shanku and Debu. A little orphan girl Sonai, and her pet dog Dogar and monkey Malini accompany them very often. Bohemian and daredevil Youngman Sentu da (Brother Sentu) sometimes helps and leads them. Tatar has a sister named Tinku.

== Movie ==
A Bengali adventure film Goyenda Tatar was released on 4 January 2019. The movie was based on the Tatar's story, Chotur Goyenda Choturabhijan by Sasthipada Chattopadhyay. This film was directed by Srikanta Galui. Adhiraj Ganguly played the lead role of Tatar.
