= Netto (film) =

2005 German film

- DVD cover
- Directed by: Robert Thalheim
- Written by: Robert Thalheim
- Produced by: Matthias Miegel
- Starring: Milan Peschel; Sebastian Butz; Stephanie Charlotta Koetz
- Distributed by: Stardust Filmverleih
- Release date: 5 May 2005 (Germany)
- Running time: 87 minutes
- Country: Germany
- Language: German

Netto is a 2005 film directed by Robert Thalheim. It is a story of father-son relationship in post-unification Berlin. The song "Mein bester Kumpel" by Peter Tschernig is used throughout the film.

== Cast ==
- Milan Peschel as Marcel Werner
- Sebastian Butz as Sebastian Werner
- Stephanie Charlotta Koetz as Nora
- Christina Grosse as Angelika
- Bernd Lambrecht as Bernd
