= Goyenda Tatar =

2019 Bengali film

- Teaser poster
- Bengali: গোয়েন্দা তাতার
- Directed by: Srikanta Galui
- Based on: Chotur Goyenda Choturabhijan by Sasthipada Chattopadhyay
- Produced by: Binod Kumar Pandey; Usha Pande
- Starring: Monu Mukharjee; Rajatava Dutta; Shantilal Mukherjee; Kharaj Mukherjee
- Music by: Anirban Ray Akash
- Production company: G V Thch Solution Pvt Ltd
- Release date: 4 January 2019
- Country: India
- Language: Bengali

Goyenda Tatar is a Bengali adventure detective film directed by Srikanta Galui and produced by Binod Kumar Pandey and Usha Pande. Music is composed by Anirban Ray Akash. The storyline of the film is based on the story, Chotur Goyenda Choturabhijan, of Sasthipada Chattopathyay, and follows a group of kids led by Goenda Tatar. The film was theatrically released on 4 January 2019.

== Plot ==
A bunch of adventurous kids and their leader Tatar are dragged into a mysterious kidnapping case. Their friend Sonai, an orphan was kidnapped by a notorious gang. They are helped by an ex-dacoit, Suleiman and bohemian Sentu da in solving the case.

== Cast ==
- Adhiraj Ganguly as Tatar
- Kharaj Mukherjee as police officer
- Rajatava Dutta as Suleiman
- Shantilal Mukherjee as Abbas
- Monu Mukherjee
- Biswajit Das as Sentu Da
- Swarnavo Goshwami as Shanku
- Kuntal Show as Chotu
- Joybrata Das as Debu
- Sridatri Sarkar as Tinku
- Debapriya Basu as Sonai

== Release ==
The official trailer of the film was released by Amara Muzik Bengali on 5 September 2018.

The film was theatrically released on 4 January 2019.
