= Ein Fall für TKKG =

- Country of origin: Germany

Ein Fall für TKKG is a title shared by two German television series which were adaptations of the TKKG franchise.

== Series ==
A live-action series having 12 episodes ran from 1985 to 1987.

An animated series having 26 cartoon episodes was released from 2014 to 2016.

== Plot ==
The individual episodes of both the series are based - with some exceptions - on the books for young people by Stefan Wolf. Again and again, the four teenagers get involved in mysterious cases, which they masterfully solve or uncover. The four attend a boarding school. Tim and Dumpling also live there, while Gaby and Karl are "externs" (they live with their parents and only come to the boarding school for school lessons). Occasionally, there are events at their school that force TKKG to intervene.

Inspector Glockner, who is also Gaby's father, can always count on the help of the young detectives. Most of the time, Tim, as the leader of the group, is responsible for the approach to the different cases. He is essentially supported in this by the highly intelligent Karl. At the end of each episode, as a running gag so to speak, Dumpling always claims the success of an action for himself.

== See also ==
- List of German television series
