= TKKG =

German series

The Junior detective series TKKG is a German series of audio dramas and novels created by "Stefan Wolf", a pseudonym used by Rolf Kalmuczak.

== The characters and their creator ==
In all German-speaking countries they are the most commercially successful series of novels of their type, apart from The Three Investigators. They call themselves TKKG, after the initials of their names: Tarzan (later renamed in Tim due to the name "Tarzan" being trademarked), Karl, Dumpling (in German Klößchen, in Austria called "Klumpling") and Gab(b)y; an unofficial fifth member is Gaby's Cocker Spaniel, called Oskar. Since 1979 they continually solve all sorts of crimes, from thefts and robberies to kidnappings and terrorism.

The books were written by Rolf Kalmuczak, under his pen name Stefan Wolf. In June 2004 TKKG changed their publisher from Pelican to CBJ - They published volumes 07, 14, 54, 77 and 84 in January 2005 as a new edition with the CBJ brand name.

=== Tim ===
Peter Timotheus Carsten is the leader of the TKKG gang, who are named after the initial letters of their names or nicknames. Tim is 14, but mentally and physically far ahead. A tanned athlete, he particularly enjoys judo (he has a brown belt) and volleyball. For two years (at the beginning of the series) he's been living in a famous boarding school, and is pupil of class 9b. His father, an engineer, had a fatal accident when Tim was only 6 years old. Tim's mother, a book-keeper, works hard to earn enough money for the expensive school money for their son. Tim loves adventure and hates injustice, and has a big crush on Gabby, of whom he is very protective.

Previously, Tim was originally called Tarzan by his friends because of his athletic prowess, but he did not want to be compared with this 'half-finished bodybuilder' after he had seen a very bad movie about him (the change actually came about because the name Tarzan was trademarked at the time).

=== Karl ===
The smartest of the quartet, Karl Vierstein is sometimes nicknamed Computer because he has an eidetic memory; whatever he's read he never forgets - perhaps because his father is a professor of mathematics and physics at the local university.

He goes into the same class as Tim, but he does not live at the boarding school. He is tall and lanky, but not athletic. He is nearsighted and is virtually helpless without his glasses, which he polishes whenever he's nervous.

=== Dumpling ===
(German nickname: "Klößchen", which means "dumpling". Klößchen is called Klumpling in Australian audio book editions and in the official English translation of the movies. Mostly this is because the K is needed to form the TKKG brand.)

His actual name is Willi Sauerlich. He lives together with Tim at the boarding school, where they share a room. His parents are rich - his father owns a chocolate ware company - but Willi likes to spend more time with his friends.

His nickname is derived from his passion for chocolate; he never can keep his fingers off anything sweet. Therefore, he grows steadily bigger around the hips. Nevertheless, he is a reliable comrade, and having a rich father as an asset has proven useful time and again. Dumpling secretly wishes to be as athletic and sprightly as his friend Tim.

Willi is actually also quite close with his father, mainly because of their common desire to eat well; Mrs. Sauerlich is a very strict vegetarian who makes them eat anything vegetable - and only vegetable. So the two keep a secret stash of the good things in the cellar, where they help themselves whenever they have the chance.

=== Gaby ===
Gabriele Glockner (in Australian audio book editions she is called "Gabby" with a double "b") is affectionately nicknamed "Pfote" ("Paw") by her friends because she loves animals and makes every animal - particularly dogs - shake paws with her. She is the daughter of police commissioner Emil Glockner and his wife Margot, who runs a small grocery store. Like Karl, she lives with her parents in town and attends Tim's boarding school only for lessons. She is very good at English and backstroking.

With her golden blonde hair and blue eyes with long eyelashes, she is quite pretty. Actually, she is also quite close to Tim, although she rarely shows it as much as he does.

=== Oskar ===
The mascot of the group is Gaby's black and white Cocker Spaniel. He accompanies the group practically anywhere.

== The town with millions of inhabitants / "town of millions" ==
The homeland of the TKKG gang is a fictitious town with millions of inhabitants somewhere in Germany. There the TKKG gang live and go to school. Tim, however, comes from a city which is a four-hour drive away. While there are speculations amongst fans that the town is actually Munich, mostly due to the usage of typical southern german vocabulary in the series as well as the "towns of millions" being stated to be the capital city of a german state, Kalmuczak frequently dismissed these as false, claiming that the similarities were purely coincidental.

== Radio dramas ==
The series has appeared since 1981 with the radio play label Europa 231 audio books were recorded and released (since 1981). CD Releases of Episodes 1 to 99 were discontinued in 2012. In 2017, Episodes 19, 20 and 37 were removed from Streaming Services, resulting in Physical Releases of these Episodes becoming sought after Collecter's Items.

=== Actors ===
- Narrator: Günther Dockerill (Episodes 1 to 56), Eric Vaessen (Episodes 57 to 60), Günter König (year 1998 / Episodes 61 to 110), Wolfgang Kaven (Episode 111 to 229), Nic Romm (since Episode 230)
- Tim/Tarzan (Peter Carsten): Sascha Draeger
- Karl Vierstein: Niki Nowotny (Episodes 1 to 197), Tobias Diakow (since Episode 198)
- Klößchen (Willi Sauerlich): Manou Lubowski
- Gaby (Gabriele Glockner): Veronika Neugebauer (Episodes 1 to 43, 53 to 166), Scarlet Lubowski (Episodes 44 to 52), Rhea Harder (since Episode 167)
- Inspector Glockner: Wolfgang Draeger (Episodes 1 to 37, Episodes 182 to 220), Edgar Bessen (Episodes 39 to 178), Achim Buch (since Episode 221)

=== Episode list ===
By 2024, 231 audiobooks have appeared, as well as seven special episodes (Treasure island with seven secrets (1995), The secret of TKKG (1995, re-issue 2010), An almost perfect Christmas menu (2018), The horror of Christmas comes tomorrow (2020), The cursed Easter egg (2021), Terrible Christmas everywhere (2021), Even crooks celebrate Christmas (2023)):

- 001 ... Die Jagd nach den Millionendieben (The hunt for the millionaire-thieves)
- 002 ... Der blinde Hellseher (The blind clairvoyant)
- 003 ... Das leere Grab im Moor (The empty grave in the swamp)
- 004 ... Das Paket mit dem Totenkopf (The skull-labeled package)
- 005 ... Das Phantom auf dem Feuerstuhl (Phantom on the fire-bike)
- 006 ... Angst in der 9a (Fear in class 9a)
- 007 ... Rätsel um die alte Villa (Mystery of the old mansion)
- 008 ... Auf der Spur der Vogeljäger (Tracing the bird-hunters)
- 009 ... Abenteuer im Ferienlager (Adventures in the holiday camp)
- 010 ... Alarm im Zirkus Sarani (Panic at Circus Sarani)
- 011 ... Die Falschmünzer vom Mäuseweg (The forgers from "Mice Way")
- 012 ... Nachts, wenn der Feuerteufel kommt (By night, when the Arsonist comes)
- 013 ... Die Bettelmönche aus Atlantis (The begging monks from Atlantis)
- 014 ... Der Schlangenmensch (The contortionist)
- 015 ... Ufos in Bad Finkenstein (Ufos in Bad Finkenstein)
- 016 ... X7 antwortet nicht (X7 does not respond)
- 017 ... Die Doppelgängerin (The Doppelganger)
- 018 ... Hexenjagd in Lerchenbach (Witch-hunt in Lerchenbach)
- 019 ... Der Schatz in der Drachenhöhle (The treasure in the Dragon's Cave)
- 020 ... Das Geheimnis der chinesischen Vase (The secret of the Chinese Vase)
- 021 ... Die Rache des Bombenlegers (The revenge of the bomb-planter)
- 022 ... In den Klauen des Tigers (In the claws of the tiger)
- 023 ... Kampf der Spione (Fight of the spies)
- 024 ... Gefährliche Diamanten (Dangerous diamonds)
- 025 ... Die Stunde der schwarzen Maske (The hour of the black mask)
- 026 ... Das Geiseldrama (The hostage drama)
- 027 ... Banditen im Palasthotel (Bandits in the Palace Hotel)
- 028 ... Verrat im Höllental (Betrayal in Abyss-Valley)
- 029 ... Hundediebe kennen keine Gnade (Dog-thieves know no mercy)
- 030 ... Die Mafia kommt zur Geisterstunde (Mafia comes at witching hour)
- 031 ... Die Entführung in der Mondscheingasse (Kidnapping at Moonlight Lane)
- 032 ... Wilddiebe im Teufelsmoor (Poacher in "Devils Swamp")
- 033 ... Wer raubte das Millionenpferd? (Who robbed the million-horse?)
- 034 ... Vampir der Autobahn (Vampire of the motorway)
- 035 ... Die Nacht des Überfalls (The night of the assault)
- 036 ... Das Geschenk des Bösen (The gift of evil)
- 037 ... Der letzte Schuss (The last shot)
- 038 ... Die weiße Schmuggler-Yacht (The white smugglers-yacht)
- 039 ... Die Gift-Party (The poison party)
- 040 ... Duell im Morgengrauen (Duel at dawn)
- 041 ... Heißes Gold im Silbersee (Hot gold in the Silver Lake)
- 042 ... Anschlag auf den Silberpfeil (Assault on Silver Arrow)
- 043 ... Gefangen in der Schreckenskammer (Imprisoned in the Fright-Chamber)
- 044 ... Um Mitternacht am schwarzen Fluss (Midnight at the Black River)
- 045 ... Unternehmen Grüne Hölle (Operation: Green Hell)
- 046 ... Hotel in Flammen (Hotel in flames)
- 047 ... Todesfracht im Jaguar (Death-freight in the Jaguar)
- 048 ... Bestien in der Finsternis (Beasts in the darkness)
- 049 ... Bombe an Bord (Bomb on board)
- 050 ... Spion auf der Flucht (Spy on the run)
- 051 ... Gangster auf der Gartenparty (Gangsters at the garden party)
- 052 ... Überfall im Hafen (Assault at the port)
- 053 ... Schüsse aus der Rosenhecke (Shots from the rose hedge)
- 054 ... Alarm! Klößchen ist verschwunden (Help! Klumpling's missing!)
- 055 ... Der Mörder aus dem Schauerwald (The murderer from awe-forest)
- 056 ... Todesgruß vom Gelben Drachen (Death greetings from the yellow dragon)
- 057 ... Jagt das rote Geisterauto (Chase that red phantom car!)
- 058 ... Der doppelte Pedro (Pedro's Double)
- 059 ... Trickdieb auf Burg Drachenstein (Snatcher at Castle Dragonstone)
- 060 ... Der Teufel vom Waiga-See (The devil from the Lake Waiga)
- 061 ... Im Schatten des Dämons (In the Demon's shadow)
- 062 ... Terror aus dem "Pulverfass" (Terror from the "Tinderbox")
- 063 ... Die Falle am Fuchsbach (The trap at fox creek)
- 064 ... Schwarze Pest aus Indien (Black plague from India)
- 065 ... Sklaven für Wutawia (Slaves for Wutawia)
- 066 ... Gauner mit der "Goldenen Hand" (The crook with the "Golden Hands")
- 067 ... Hinterhalt im Eulenforst (Ambush at the owl forest)
- 068 ... Rauschgiftrazzia im Internat (Drug raid at the boarding school)
- 069 ... Achtung! Die "Monsters" kommen (Danger! The "Monsters" are coming)
- 070 ... Wer hat Tims Mutter entführt? (Who snatched Tim's mother?)
- 071 ... Stimmen aus der Unterwelt (Voices from the underworld)
- 072 ... Taschengeld für ein Gespenst (Pocket money for a ghost)
- 073 ... Herr der Schlangeninsel (Master of Snake Island)
- 074 ... Im Schattenreich des Dr. Mubase (In the Shadow Realm of Dr.Mubase)
- 075 ... Lösegeld am Henkersberg (Ransom at Henkersberg)
- 076 ... Die Goldgräberbande (The Gold-Diggers Gang)
- 077 ... Der erpresste Erpresser (The blackmailed Blackmailer)
- 078 ... Heißer Draht nach Paradiso (Hotline to Paradiso)
- 079 ... Ein Toter braucht Hilfe (A dead one needs assistance)
- 080 ... Weißes Gift im Nachtexpress (White poison on the Night Train)
- 081 ... Horror-Trip im Luxusauto (The horror journey in the limousine)
- 082 ... Spuk aus dem Jenseits (Spook from the afterlife)
- 083 ... Hilfe! Gaby in Gefahr (Help! Gaby's in danger!)
- 084 ... Dynamit im Kofferraum (Dynamite in the trunk)
- 085 ... Freiheit für gequälte Tiere (Freedom for tortured animals)
- 086 ... Die Schatzsucher-Mafia schlägt zu (The Treasure-Hunter Mafia strikes)
- 087 ... Der böse Geist vom Waisenhaus (Evil spirit of the orphanage)
- 088 ... Kampf um das Zauberschwert "Drachenauge" (Fight for the magic "Drageoneye" sword)
- 089 ... Feind aus der Vergangenheit (Enemy from the past)
- 090 ... Schmuggler reisen unerkannt (Smugglers travel anonymous)
- 091 ... Crash-Kids riskieren ihr Leben (Crash-Kids risk their lives)
- 092 ... Der grausame Rächer (The cruel avenger)
- 093 ... Die Opfer mit der kühlen Schnauze (The victims with the cool snout)
- 094 ... In dunkler Nacht am Marmorgrab (In darkness at the marble grave)
- 095 ... U-Bahn des Schreckens (Subway of fright)
- 096 ... Die Entführung des Popstars (Kidnap of the popstar)
- 097 ... Die Hand an den Sternen (The Hand at the stars)
- 098 ... Die Haie vom Lotus-Garten (The sharks from the Lotus-Garden)
- 099 ... Hilflos in eisiger Nacht (Helpless in the freezing night)
- 100 ... Fieser Trick mit Nr. 100 (Nasty trick with No. 100)
- 101 ... Opfer fliegen 1. Klasse (Victims fly 1st. Class)
- 102 ... Angst auf der Autobahn (Fear on the motorway)
- 103 ... Mörderischer Stammbaum (Murderous family tree)
- 104 ... Im Wettbüro des Teufels (In the devils' betting office)
- 105 ... Vermisste Kids und Killerpflanzen (Missing Kids and killer plants)
- 106 ... Mädchenraub im Ferienhaus (Kidnapped girl at Holiday House)
- 107 ... Lösegeld für einen Irrtum (Ransom for a fallacy)
- 108 ... Das Konzert bei den Ratten (Concert with the rats)
- 109 ... Mörderspiel im Burghotel (Murder-play at the castle Hotel)
- 110 ... Das Phantom im Schokoladen-Museum (Phantom in the Chocolate Museum)
- 111 ... Die tödliche Falle (The deadly trap)
- 112 ... Bombenspaß bei Kies & Knete ('Bombing-spree' at "Dosh & Brass")
- 113 ... Mit heißer Nadel Jagd auf Kids (With hot needle-hunt on kids)
- 114 ... Die Sekte Satans (Satans' Sect)
- 115 ... Der Diamant im Bauch der Kobra (The Diamond in the belly of the cobra)
- 116 ... Klassenfahrt zur Hexenburg (Class trip to "Witch Castle")
- 117 ... Im Schloss der schlafenden Vampire (In the castle of the sleeping vampires)
- 118 ... Im Kaufhaus ist der Teufel los (In the department store all hell breaks loose)
- 119 ... Frische Spur nach 70 Jahren (Fresh trace after 70 years)
- 120 ... Bei Anruf Angst (Dial 'F' for Fear)
- 121 ... Ein cooler Typ aus der Hölle (A cool guy out of Hell)
- 122 ... Der Goldschatz, der vom Himmel fiel (The treasure, which fell from the sky)
- 123 ... Mordkomplott im Luxus-Klo (Conspiracy in the luxury loo)
- 124 ... Vergebliche Suche nach Gaby (Futile search for Gaby)
- 125 ... Der Mörder aus einer anderen Zeit (The murderer from another time)
- 126 ... Teddy Talers Höllenfahrt (Teddy Talers' trip to Hell)
- 127 ... Im Schlauchboot durch die Unterwelt (In a rubber raft through the Underworld)
- 128 ... Die Gehilfen des Terrors (The Assistants of Terror)
- 129 ... Der Erpresser fährt bis Endstation (Last Exit for Blackmailers)
- 130 ... Die gefährliche Zeugin verschwindet (The disappearance of the dangerous witness)
- 131 ... Stundenlohn für flotte Gangster (Hourly wages for quick gangsters)
- 132 ... Homejacker machen Überstunden (Homejackers do overtime)
- 133 ... Auf vier Pfoten zur Millionenbeute (On four paws to the million-bounty)
- 134 ... Wer stoppt die Weihnachts-Gangster? (Who'll stop the Christmas-Gangsters?)
- 135 ... Der Meisterdieb und seine Feinde (The Master Thief and his enemies)
- 136 ... Argentinische Entführung (Argentine kidnapping)
- 137 ... Verschleppt ins Tal Diabolo (Kidnapped into "Valley Diabolo")
- 138 ... Raubzug mit Bumerang (Raid with boomerang)
- 139 ... Oskar jagt die Drogendealer (Oskar hunts the dealer)
- 140 ... Draculas Erben (Dracula's heirs)
- 141 ... Todesbiss der schwarzen Mamba (Death-bite of the Black Mamba)
- 142 ... Bankräuber mit Supertrick (Bank-robber with the Super-Trick)
- 143 ... Das unheimliche Haus (The uncanny House)
- 144 ... Schreckensnacht im Schlangenmaul (Fright night in the queue muzzle)
- 145 ... Hinterhalt am schwarzen Fels (Ambush at the black rock)
- 146 ... Nonstop in die Raketenfalle (Non-stop into the rocket-trap)
- 147 ... Hölle ohne Hintertür (Hell without a back door)
- 148 ... Fieser Trick beim Finale (Nasty trick at the Endgame)
- 149 ... Tims gefährlichster Gegner (Tim's most dangerous opponent)
- 150 ... Heiße Nächte im Dezember (Torrid nights in December)
- 151 ... Gekauftes Spiel (Paid Game)
- 152 ... Max und Anna, ein diebisches Paar (Max & Anna, a larcenous couple)
- 153 ... Es geschah in einer Regennacht (It happened on a rainy night)
- 154 ... Das Geheimnis der Burgruine (The secret of the castle ruins)
- 155 ... Gefangen im Spukhaus (Imprisoned in the haunted house)
- 156 ... Erpresser fahren Achterbahn (Blackmailers ride rollercoasters)
- 157 ... Oskar und die sieben Zwerge (Oskar and the seven dwarves)
- 158 ... Trainer unter Verdacht (Coach under suspicion)
- 159 ... Böses Spiel im Sommercamp (Bad game at the summercamp)
- 160 ... Das Grauen naht um Zwölf (Dread approaches at twelve)
- 161 ... Ein Yeti in der Millionenstadt (A Yeti in the town of millions)
- 162 ... Gefahr für Oskar! (Oskar in danger!)
- 163 ... Die Makler-Mafia (Broker-Mafia)
- 164 ... Operation Hexen-Graffiti (Operation: Witch-Graffiti)
- 165 ... Advent mit Knalleffekt (Advent with a big bang)
- 166 ... Das Mädchen mit der Kristallkugel (The girl with the Crystal Ball)
- 167 ... Der Unsichtbare (The Invisible)
- 168 ... Millioncoup im Stadtion (Millions-coup at the stadium)
- 169 ... Tatort Dschungel (Crime Scene: Jungle)
- 170 ... Schock im Schnee (Shock in the snow)
- 171 ... Das lebende Gemälde (The living painting)
- 172 ... Das Geheimnis der Moorleiche (The secret of the body in the Moors)
- 173 ... Die Skelettbande (The Skeleton Gang)
- 174 ... Doppelgänger auf der Rennbahn (Doppelganger on the Racing Track)
- 175 ... Nachtwanderung mit Schrecken (Night Hike with Shock)
- 176 ... Verbrechen im Rampenlicht (Crimes in the footlight)
- 177 ... Die Spur der Wölfin (The trail of the she-wolf)
- 178 ... Hai-Alarm im Aqua-Park (Shark alert in water park)
- 179 ... Abzocke im Online-Chat (The Rip-Off in the Online-Chat)
- 180 ... Alarm im Raubtierhaus (Alarm in the predator house)
- 181 ... Der vertauschte Koffer (The switched suitcase)
- 182 ... Im Bann des Übersinnlichen (Under the spell of the supernatural)
- 183 ... Blindgänger im Villenviertel (Duds in the villa district)
- 184 ... Die ewige Finsternis (The eternal Darkness)
- 185 ... Der unsichtbare Dieb (The invisible thief)
- 186 ... Die schlafende Chinesin (The sleeping chinese)
- 187 ... Ausspioniert! (Spied on!)
- 188 ... Die blauen Schafe von Artelsbach (The blue sheep from Artelsbach)
- 189 ... Iwan, der Schreckliche (Iwan, the terrible)
- 190 ... Der eiskalte Clown (The ice-cold clown)
- 191 ... Nord-Nordwest zum Hexenplatz (North-Northwest on the Witches place)
- 192 ... Feuer auf Gut Ribbeck (Fire at the Ribbeck Manor)
- 193 ... Das Weihnachts-Phantom (The Christmas-Phantom)
- 194 ... Der Friedhof der Namenlosen (The graveyard of the nameless)
- 195 ... Dem Sonnenkönig auf der Spur (On the trace of the Sun King)
- 196 ... Tatort Wagenburg (Crime Scene Wagenburg)
- 197 ... Bei Anpfiff Übergabe (Handover at kick-off)
- 198 ... Der Golem vom Dunkelsee (The Golem of the Dark lake)
- 199 ... Verfolgungsjagd vor Mitternacht (Chase before midnight)
- 200 ... Der große Coup (The great coup)
- 201 ... Vom Goldschatz besessen (Obsessed by the goldtreasure)
- 202 ... Ein Paradies für Diebe (A paradise for thieves)
- 203 ... Der Räuber mit der Weihnachtsmaske (The robber with the christmasmask)
- 204 ... Verschwörung auf Hoher See (Conspiracy on high sea)
- 205 ... Teuflische Kaffeefahrt (Devilish cross-border excursion)
- 206 ... Achtung, Ufo-Kult! (Watch out, Ufo-Cult!)
- 207 ... Doppelte Entführung (Double kidnapping)
- 208 ... Geheimnis im Tresor (Secret in the vault)
- 209 ... Drohbriefe von Unbekannt (Threat letters from unknown)
- 210 ... Raubzug im Casino (Raid in the casino)
- 211 ... Geiselnahme im Villenviertel (Hostage taking in the residential area)
- 212 ... Tyrannei Kommando Eins (Tyranny Squad One)
- 213 ... Das unheimliche Dorf (The unsettling village)
- 214 ... Diamantenrausch auf der A9 (Diamond Rush on the A9)
- 215 ... Verbrechen im Moorsteiner Wald (Crimes in the Moorstein Forest)
- 216 ... Das Geheimnis im Jagdschloss (The Secret in the Hunting Castle)
- 217 ... Tödliche Klarinettte (Deathly Clarinette)
- 218 ... Schutzgeld für Dämonen (Protection money for Demons)
- 219 ... Terror frei Haus (Terror for free)
- 220 ... Attentat am Gämsengrat (Assassination on the Gämsen ridge)
- 221 ... Beim Raubzug helfen Ahnungslose (Help of Innocent People in robbery)
- 222 ... Roter Drache 222 (Red Dragon 222)
- 223 ... Betrüger Super Sauber (Cheater Super Clean)
- 224 ... Bilderdiebe haben kein Gesicht (Picture Thieves got no face)
- 225 ... Tanz mit der Giftschlange (Dance with the Poisonous Snake)
- 226 ... Der Täter ist unter uns (The Culprit is among us)
- 227 ... Zwei für Zwölf (Two for Twelve)
- 228 ... Das Geld, das niemand wollte (The Money nobody wanted)
- 229 ... Auf den Schwingen des Totenvogels (On the wings of the deads' bird)
- 230 ... Die Tesla-Verschwörung (The Tesla conspiracy)
- 231 ... Knackis streicheln mit der Faust (Stroking prisoners by fist)
- 232 ... Drohnenaugen in der Nacht (Drone Eyes in the Night)
- 233 ... Räuberwald (Robbers' Forest)
- 234 ... Im Auftrag des Bösen (On behalf of the Evil)
- 235 ... Ein Gruselfest für ein Vermögen (A scary party for a fortune)
- 236 ... Schatten aus der Unterwelt (Shadows from the Underworld)
- 237 ... K.I. Kriminelle Illusion (K.I. Criminal Illusion)
- 238 ... Nur Tote schlafen länger (Only the dead sleep longer)
- 239 ... Vollgas ins Verderben (Full speed ahead to disaster)
- 240 ... Das verschollene Zepter von Gizeh (The Lost Scepter of Giza)
- 241 ... Das Rätsel der Gruselvilla (The Mystery of the Haunted Mansion)
- 242 ... Verbrechen live im Radio (Crime Live on the Radio)
- 243 ... Die Fährte des Hehlers (The Fence's Trail)

== TKKG on television and in cinema ==
see Ein Fall für TKKG

Between 1985 and 1987 TKKG was developed for ZDF a twelve episode TV cartoon serial. The first six episodes were shown between 7 November 1985 and 12 December 1985 on ZDF. Episodes 7 - 12 had also been broadcast on ZDF two years later between 22 October 1987 and 26 November 1987 for the first time. Afterwards all episodes in irregular order were broadcast on ZDF and on KI.KA. (There. among other things. in the context of the broadcast "TKKG - Der Club der Detektive"). In the main roles, Fabian Harloff started from episode 7 as Tim, Christian Pfaff as Karl, Kai Maahs as Doughnut and Jessica Gast as Gaby.

1. Das leere Grab im Moor
2. Angst in der 9 A
3. Die Jagd nach den Millionendieben
4. Der Schlangenmensch
5. Das Geheimnis der chinesischen Vase
6. Der blinde Hellseher
7. Überfall im Hafen
8. Bestien in der Finsternis
9. Spion auf der Flucht
10. Gangster auf der Gartenparty
11. Haie an Bord
12. Todesfracht im Jaguar

Movies in Cinema

- Drachenauge (The Dragon's Eye, 1992)
- TKKG: The Secret of the Mysterious Mind Machine (2006), produced by Constantin Film and directed by Tomy Wigand.
- TKKG (2019), produced by Warner Bros. Film Productions Germany and directed by Robert Thalheim.

== Comics ==
Ehapa published 17 TKKG comics (issues 1–2/1987, 1–12/1988 and 1–3/1989). They were produced by studio Comicon. One of the illustrators was Josep Marti, who was also involved in the making of Yps.

== TKKG in other countries ==
=== France ===
In France, thirteen TKKG books have been published in French from 1981 to 1985. The names of the main characters have been slightly changed : Tarzan, Karl, Klaus, Gaby.

=== Indonesia ===
In Indonesia, TKKG books are translated to Indonesian. The names of all the main characters have been changed to facilitate the locals to pronounce the names. The series is known as "STOP", which represents the acronym of the altered names of the main characters:

- Sporty (Tim in the original version)
- Thomas (Karl in the original version)
- Oskar (Klößchen in the original version)
- Petra (Gaby in the original version)

The first 9 computer games were translated into English (the first 3 were sold in English-speaking countries; the last 6 were not and were translated for educational reasons). TKKG was kept as the names, but changed;

- Tim became Tiger, or Peter Carsten.
- Karl became Kevin Forestone or the Computer.
- Gaby became Katy Crocker, or the Paw.
- Klößchen became Grunter, or Basil Sowerby.
