= African Film =

Nigerian magazine

- Cover of African Film No 103: The Spear meets Bomber Brown, Chapter 2.
- Categories: Photocomics Magazine
- Frequency: Weekly
- Publisher: Drum Publications Ltd
- First issue: 1968-1972
- Company: Drum Publications Ltd
- Country: Nigeria
- Language: English

African Film was a Nigerian comics magazine, published between 1968 and 1972. It was just one of the many photo comics or "look books" that flooded English-speaking West Africa in the early post-colonial era. Catering to the new urban youth, the series featured the mythical persona of Lance Spearman, a.k.a. "The Spear," a black James Bond-like crime fighter as the central character. The character was portrayed by Jore Mkwanazi

== Content and Themes ==
In contrast to the racist stereotype of the uncivilised, uneducated, spear-carrying cannibal, or the eroticised "noble savage" that characterised the depictions of Africans in most Western comic books from the time, Spearman was sharp, stylish and sophisticated.

Combining re-appropriated Western references with a distinctly African cultural identity, he reflected a newly defined black Atlantic modernity. Here was a comic book hero that presented a potential critique of colonialism, as well as a significant variation in how the genre classically figured normality and otherness.

== Publishing ==
African Film was published by South African Drum Publications in Nigeria and later also Kenya and Ghana in the early 60s. Although the series was criticised for its sometimes stereotyped portrayals of blackness and masculinity, it nonetheless had a lasting influence in fostering postcolonial pride and identity. Its combination of extreme (often cartoon-like) violence, with pastiches of early Hollywood melodramas, dashes of romance and glamour - via the street and touches of black nationalism preceded the Blaxploitation explosion in American cinemas in the 70s and its use of inventive DIY tactics to overcome budget constraints (Spearman's trademark Corvette Stingray was often a picture of a dinky-toy) had a lasting influence on the Nollywood industry.

== Digital preservation ==
Existing copies of African Film are being digitally restored and colourised for preservation by the African Film Digital Archive.
