= Pandab Goenda =

Indian Bengali Animated Series

Pandob Goenda
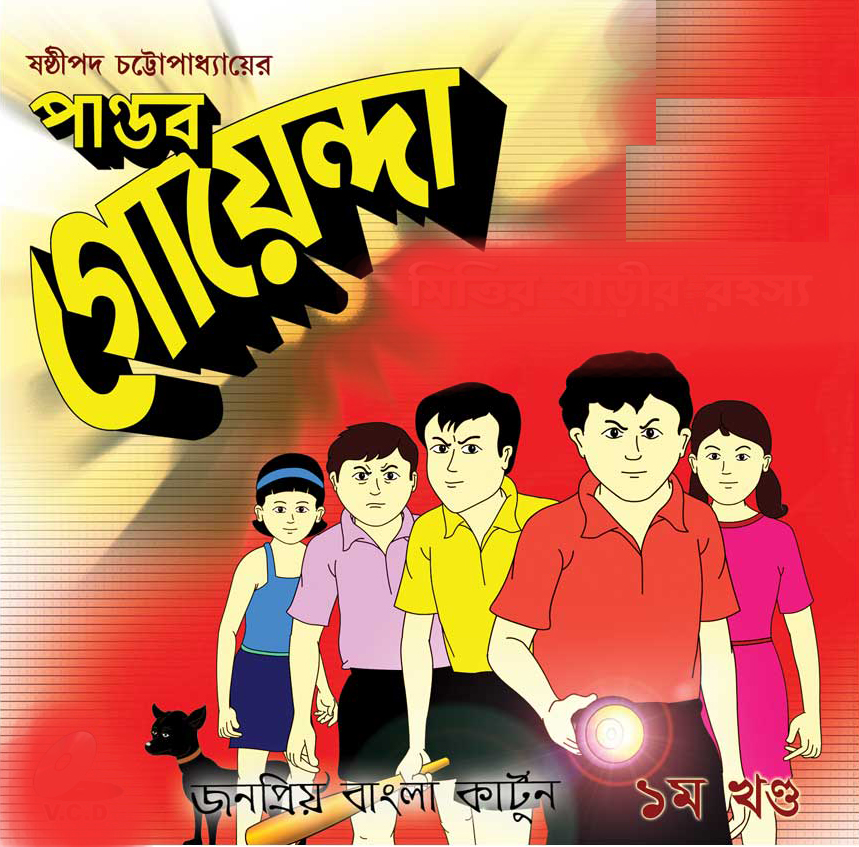
- Author: Sasthipada Chattopadhyay
- Original title: পাণ্ডব গোয়েন্দা
- Country: India
- Language: Bengali
- Genre: Mystery / Crime
- Publisher: Ananda Publishers, Deb Sahitya Kutir
- No. of books: 30+

Pandab Goenda is a fictional detective novel series created by Bengali novelist Sasthipada Chattopadhyay. The stories of Pandab Goenda are well known and popular in Bengali Children's literature.

== Characters ==
Pandab Goenda is a detective gang of five children who love to solve mysteries. They are Bablu, Bilu, Bhombol, and two sisters named Bachchu, Bichchhu. They live in Howrah, accompanied by a one eyed street dog Panchu. Bablu always leads the team Pandab Goenda, he also carries a pistol. The five are adventurous, intelligent and fearless. Pandab Goenda roam various parts of India to solve cases. There characters are loosely inspired by Enid Blyton's detective book The Famous Five.

== Stories ==
The stories of Pandab Goenda were published in Shuktara magazine in late 70's but the first book was published in 1981 by New Bengal Press. Thereafter, more than 30 books have been published in this series. Some stories were published in Bengali child magazines Anandamela and Shuktara.

== Adaptation ==
A Bengali animation television series was developed on the Pandab Goenda stories. It was telecast for a period of 4 years by Akash Bangla Television station. Under the direction of Rahul Mukhopadhyay, Pandab Goenda was adapted on the small screen by Zee Bangla TV channel titled Pandab Goenda. This series was adapted from the original series but was based on a much more modern time frame. It earned huge popularity among the masses. The original storyline of the series was altered a lot and due to this particular reason, this series faced a lot of criticism from the viewers as well as from Sasthipada Chattopadhyay himself after the initial promo was released.
