= Mahmoud Salem =

Egyptian journalist and writer (1931–2013)

- Born: 1931; Alexandria
- Died: 24 February 2013 (aged 81–82); Cairo
- Citizenship: Egyptian
- Education: High school
- Occupation: Journalist
- Writing career
- Language: Arabic
- Period: Late 1960s – 2000s
- Genres: Children's literature; Detective fiction; Mystery fiction
- Notable works: The 13 Devils; Al Moghameron Al Khamsa (The Five Adventurers)

Mahmoud Salem (Arabic: محمود سالم; 1931 – 24 February 2013) was an Egyptian author known for writing mystery and children's books, including the Al Moghameron Al Khamsa adventure series. He has been referred to as the Godfather of Egyptian Pop Fiction.

== Early life and education ==
Salem was born in Alexandria in 1931 as a son of a naval officer. He was raised in different cities in Egypt.

He first attended a military college, but left it due to his membership to a leftist group during the late 1940s. Then he joined Cairo University's faculty of law. However, he again left his studies.

== Career and activities ==
After leaving his studies at the faculty of law, Salem began to work as a journalist. During the 1950s, he worked for the state-run daily Al Gomhuria, first as military reporter during the Suez war and then, as head of the crime section. During the 1960s he worked for the Radio and Television Magazine and then, for the children's magazine Samir where he began to write detective and mystery fiction. He fled the country and lived in Lebanon when he was forced to exile due to his Nasserist views in the 1970s. Until his last days, he published weekly political articles in the newspaper, Al Tahrir. One of his latest articles published on 22 February 2013 involved criticisms against the Muslim Brotherhood.

=== Works ===
Salem was the author of many well-known books in Arabic, targeting children and adolescents. Total number of his books is nearly 300. Salem started out translating English children's books like The Five Find-Outers before writing the 1968 book The Burning Shack Case under Dar El Maref's police stories line up, which ended up becoming a big seller and beginning The Five Adventurers series, that follows the adventures of a group of young children – Tewfik (Takhtakh), Nossa, Loza, Moheb, Atef and their dog Zinger as they solve different mysteries and crimes ranging from robberies to stopping criminal groups and terrorists. In 1972, It was released in an Egyptian television miniseries starred by Egyptian film star Salah Zulfikar.

In a 2007 interview, Salem spoke about how the five adventurers were actually an attempt to restore his memories as a lonely introverted boy who moved with his family into Northern governorates due to his father's work as naval officer.

The original series written by Salem ran from 1968 until 1972 when he was let go due to his Nasserism leanings before being continued with the later books in the series done by other writers as well as other kid detective books being published. Due to his career at that point being at a standstill in Egypt, he was forced to move to Lebanon to continue his writing career.

It was during his exile in Lebanon where he would work on a new book series, The 13 Devils. It was series of mystery novels, in which 13 characters from different Arab countries deal with plots of foreign intelligence service. In 2007, one of his stories was filmed.

== Death ==
Salem died in Cairo at the age of 82 on 24 February 2013.
