= Robert Thalheim =

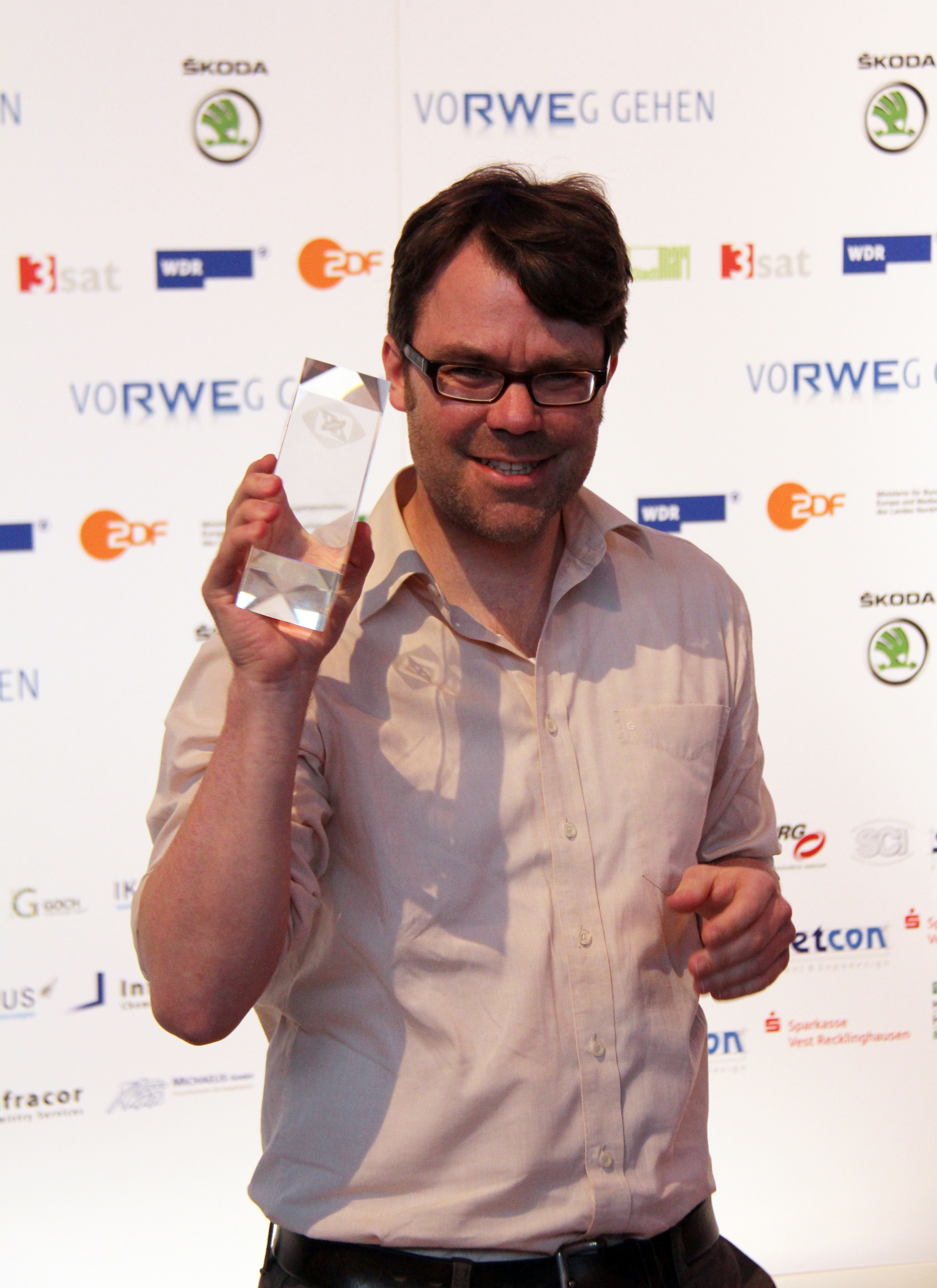
- Thalheim in 2011
- Born: 2 July 1974 (age 51); Berlin, Germany
- Occupations: writer and director

Robert Thalheim (born 2 July 1974, in Berlin) is a German stage and film director and screenwriter.

Thalheim was an assistant director at the Berliner Ensemble in 1997–98. He then studied modern German literature, history and politics at the Free University of Berlin until the year 2000; during this period he edited the first issues of the culture magazine Plotky. In 2000 he began to study film directing at the Filmhochschule (film school) in Potsdam-Babelsberg. His teacher there was Rosa von Praunheim, who monitored his work on his first films. Thalheim shot the film Pink Children (2012) together with 4 German directors about their mentor Rosa von Praunheim.

Robert Thalheim returned to the theatre in 2003, staging his own play, Wild Boys at the Maxim Gorki Theater in Berlin. In 2004 his debut film Netto was awarded the Art of Film Award at the Festival of German Film. In 2006 he finished his film for the diploma exam, And Along Come Tourists (Am Ende kommen Touristen). The film was shot on location at the International Youth Meeting Center in Oświęcim/Auschwitz, where Thalheim was a volunteer in 1996–97, and near the Auschwitz concentration camp. This documentary film, produced by Hans-Christian Schmid and Britta Knöller, was presented at the Cannes Film Festival in 2007 and was released in Germany in August 2007.

== Filmography ==
- Netto (2005)
- And Along Come Tourists (2007)
- Westwind (2011)
- Parents (2013)
- Old Agent Men (2017)
- TKKG (2019)
- The Billion Dollar Code (2021)

== Awards ==
- Best Script Award at the Berlinale 2005 for the feature film Netto
- German Cinemaprize 2005 for Netto
- German film critic-prize 2006, “best film debut” for Netto
- German "Kritikerpreis" 2008
