= Bhaduri Moshai =

Fictional detective

Bhaduri Moshai (Mr. Bhaduri) is a fictional detective character of Indian Bengali poet and novelist Nirendranath Chakraborty. Chakraborty wrote a series of thriller stories of Bhaduri Moshai.

== Character ==
Bhaduri Moshai is a former Central Bureau of Investigation (CBI) officer. His real name is Charu Chandra Bhaduri. After retirement, Mr. Bhaduri likes to solve mysterious cases privately. He runs a detective agency, Charu Bhaduri Investigation, with headquarters in Bangalore. His assistant, Kaushik lives in Kolkata. The narrator of all the stories is a relative of Kaushik. One comic character, Sadananda Basu, also joins sometimes with them. Bhaduri Moshai loves to solve crossword puzzles.

== Stories ==
- Bishangarer Sona
- Pahari Biche
- Kaminir Kanthahar
- Jaal Vejal
- Vor Rater Artonad
- Tusare Rokter Daag
- Angti Rahasya
- Bigraher Chokh
- Bhuture Football
