= Goenda Baradacharan =

Fictional detective

- First appearance: Monojder Advut Bari
- Last appearance: Patalbabur Bipod
- Created by: Shirshendu Mukhopadhyay
- Portrayed by: Bratya Basu

In-universe information
- Gender: Male
- Title: Goenda (Detective)
- Occupation: Private Investigator
- Religion: Hinduism
- Nationality: Indian

Goenda Baradacharan is a Bengali fictional detective character created by novelist Shirshendu Mukhopadhyay. The character first appeared in the novel Monojder Advut Bari. Thereafter, a short story Goenda Baradacharan was published in Anandamela magazine in 1976. Mukhopadhyay wrote a number of detective stories of Baradacharan, some of which were translated into English.

== Character ==
Baradacharan is by profession a detective. He is a well built man, aged about 30 and uses a pistol. He has his old mother in his home. His nephew Chakku works as his assistant and he has a pet dog, Donkey. Baradacharan's activities is little comical and peculiar. He follows different and unorthodox styles of investigation to solve funny cases. Very often, he helps when people lose their vegetables or cattle.

== Stories ==
- Kustir Pyanch
- Nayanchand
- Gayapatir Bipod
- Goenda Baradacharan
- Tahale
- Bahurupi Baradacharan
- Patalbabur Bipod

== Film adaptation ==
Actor-politician Bratya Basu played the role of Baradacharan in Anindya Chattopadhyay’s movie Manojder Adbhut Bari.
