= Al Moghameron Al Khamsa =

Al Moghameron Al Khamsa (Arabic: المغامرون الخمسة, lit. 'The Five Adventurers or The Adventurous Five'), is a series of children's adventure books written by Egyptian author Mahmoud Salem. It was depicted in a miniseries aired in Egyptian television starring Salah Zulfikar in 1972.

The first book, لغز الكوخ المحترق (The Burning Shack Case) was published in 1968. The series ran for a total of 167 books.

The novels feature the adventures of a group of young children – Tewfik (Takhtakh), Nossa, Loza, Moheb, Atef and their dog Zinger. The five and their dog live In Maadi as they solve different crimes ranging from robberies to stopping criminal groups and terrorists.

The popularity of the books led to a number of adaptations including an animated series and a live action film.

== Background ==
The author of the books Mahmoud Salem started out translating English children's books like "The Five Find-Outers" before he ended up creating his own team of kid detectives. In fact, some of the earlier stories have strong similarities to some of the Five Find-Outers stories.

The first book "The Burning Shack Case" was published in 1968 by "Dar El Maref" (Knowledge House) under their Police story line up and was a big seller.

In a 2007 interview, Salem spoke about how the 5 adventurers were actually an attempt to restore his memories as a lonely introverted boy who moved with his family into Northern governorates due to his father's work as naval officer.

The original series written by Salem ran from 1968 until 1972 when Salem was let go due to his Nasserism leanings (though he seemed to have changed some of his Nasserite views later years even criticizing several of Nasser's policies, he was also a strong critic of the Muslim Brotherhood, criticizing them in his Op-ed in Tahrir newspaper) before being continued with the later books in the series done by other writers as well as other kid detective books being published.

Despite that, the books written by Mahmoud Salem are considered the superior work by fans, in fact Salem has been referred to as the Godfather of Egyptian Pop Fiction.

The series' popularity in other Arabic speaking markets led to a number of similar titled books in both Syria and Lebanon, with the Syrian series still set in Egypt and featuring older versions of the characters.

== Characters ==
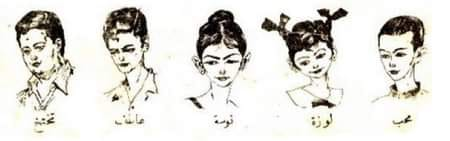
From Left to Right: Takhtakh, Atef, Nossa, Loza, and Moheb

=== The five ===
- Tewfik who goes by the nickname Takhtakh (a word in arabic of which the four letters point to the first, second, third, and the family name of Tawfik Khalil Tawfik Kharbotly) due to his weight (an Arabic term similar to Fatty) is the leader of the five as well as the eldest, is good with disguises and picking locks and trained in both Judo and Wrestling.
- Nossa is the oldest girl in the group, as well as the brains of the adventurers and the one who tries to keep a cool head during tense situations, is nicknamed the Encyclopedia by her friends due to her knowledge in different subjects and is the one responsible for organizing information, files and archives of the team's cases.
- Loza is the youngest of the team, real name Zakia, despite her age she's quite daring and intelligent and has strong focus that she can notice clues others miss.
- Moheb, Nossa's brother, the most courageous of the five, which tends to get him into trouble, he also has a fascination with cars that helps in cases due to knowledge of different vehicles and is very athletic due to his love of football. He wants to be a doctor like his uncle when he grows up.
- Atef, Loza's brother, the witty member of the group who likes to lighten the mood, he's quite the artist and his skill has helped the team in their cases as he can draw the images of criminals they came across by memory.

They are joined in their cases by Zinger, a police dog that belongs to Takhtakh, Zinger's strong sense of smell has helped the team in their cases and is smart enough for Loza to call him "the smartest dog in the world".

=== Recurring Characters ===
- Inspector Sammy, head of the Criminal Investigation Department in Cairo, though skeptical at first, he has enormous confidence in the five's abilities that he would at times request assistance from the group and even as far hoping Takhtakh would join the police force when he grows up and become his right-hand man.
- Sergeant Ali, nicknamed Sergeant Farkaah by the five (Arabic for explosion or pop) due to his hot temper and how he would tell the five to "Pop Off!", he works for the police department in Maadi where the five reside, unlike Inspector Sammy he gets annoyed when the five solve cases as he feels this makes him and the rest of the department look bad, it doesn't help that Zinger likes to play tricks on him. Despite this animosity, the kids respect him and is shown to be a nice guy deep down who cares for the kids safety and has assisted the five in their cases from time to time.

== Film and television adaptations ==
There were a number of adaptations including a TV drama, an animated series and recently a film adaptation that ended up being the first Egyptian film in history to have an online premier, which was due to the recent pandemic:

- One of the early adaptations was a 1973 children's television series, starring Egyptian actor Salah Zulfikar in the role of Inspector Sammy.
- There was another TV drama in the 80s, the kids here are a lot older than they are in the books possibly either to avoid negative reactions from audiences to seeing children in violent situations or simply for getting people who could act
- The animated series and the most well known incarnation of the books, which aired in the mid 2000s and ran for 5 seasons, which each season premiering during the month of Ramadan.
- There was a Kuwaiti television adaptation produced by Al Jazeera.
- The most recent adaptation a 2020 film production based on the first book that was produced by Egyptian actor Ashraf Abdel Baqi's Workshop Productions, Baqi also starred in the film as Inspector Sammy. Due to the COVID-19 pandemic, the film ended up being the first Egyptian film in history to have an online premier instead of being played in theatres.
