= Lance Spearman =

Fictional character

- Follow the adventures of Lance Spearman.
- First appearance: 1968
- Last appearance: 1972
- Created by: Drum Publications
- Portrayed by: Joe Mkwanazi

In-universe information
- Nickname: The Spear
- Species: Human
- Gender: Male
- Title: African Film
- Occupation: Detective, super-spy
- Nationality: Pan African

Lance Spearman (aka "The Spear") is a fictional character created in the mid-60s by Drum Publications. The adventures of Lance Spearman was published in a weekly photo comic that went by the title African Film in East and West Africa and Spear Magazine in South Africa, and was featured in over one hundred and fifty issues. Lance Spearman was widely regarded as the James Bond of English speaking Africa from Kenya on the East Coast to South Africa, and across the West Coast in Nigeria and Ghana. At its zenith, Lance Spearman had over half a million fans across the continent until the series was discontinued in 1972.

The fictional Spear is a sophisticated African super-spy, detective and superhero, all rolled into one, who sports a goatee, smokes expensive cigars, drinks Whisky on the rocks, and dresses in well tailored suits complete with a bow tie and a Panama hat. Spear likes buxom women and drives the Corvette Sting Ray. Spear is an expert marksman and is skilled at karate and boxing.

== Publication history ==
=== Creation and inspiration ===
In response to the Caucasian characters that dominated the market in the 1960s and 1970s, James Richard Abe Bailey was inspired to produce African Film. The magazine was a look-read or Photo-comic designed for Pan-African distribution and readership, and was published under the banner of Drum Publications of South Africa. Drum Publications bought the stories from local African students, and had them edited in Johannesburg, South Africa. Malcolm Dunkfeld, a white South African, was the editor in charge of the African Film in Johannesburg. The scripts were then sent to Swaziland, where photographers led by Stanley N. Bunn and Trevor Barrett took photos of black actors acting out the stories. The completed photographic strips were then sent to London, where they would be printed, before being shipped back to South Africa for distribution to West Africa, East Africa, and South Africa.

In the 1950s, 1960s, and 1970s, several African nations had gained their independence from Europe. To avoid bias and conflict, the editors at Drum chose to make the stories non-racial and non-political. The editors also realized that the demographics across the continent were varied and readers in the different parts of the continent had specialized interests. Thus, Drum Publications published several editions of the magazine featuring Lance Spearman for different parts of the continent. In West and East Africa, the publication was published as African Film, and in South Africa, it was published as The Spear. In South Africa, Lance Spearman had a readership of approximately 20,000; 45,000 in East Africa and 100,000 in West Africa.

=== Allies and Enemies ===
The Spear's loyal allies are his agile assistant "Sonia", who is capable of dispensing impressive karate kicks when in combat; a twelve-year-old sidekick known as "Lemmy" who uses a catapult as his primary weapon; and a uniformed Police Officer called "Captain Victor".

His enemies are characters such as "The Cat", a burglar who climbs walls of tall buildings; "Dr. Devil", an evil genius whose electronic wizardry directs international experimental rockets off course; Rabon Zollo; Themermolls; and Countess Scarlett.

== Fighting styles and vehicles ==
=== Fighting Styles ===
The Spear uses reverse karate kicks, and his fists. His favored handgun is a Beretta that he refers to as "my little friend".

=== Vehicles ===
The Spear's favorite vehicle is the Corvette Sting Ray.

== Cultural impact ==
The adventures of Lance Spearman catered to the new urban youth, who had left the villages for the cities in search of a better life. The Spear combined re-appropriated Western references with a distinctly African cultural identity. He reflected a newly defined black Atlantic modernity and fostered a post-colonial pride in them by portraying The Spear as an urbanite who eats, loves, fights, drinks, smokes, and talks with ease, style and self-confidence. The adventures of Lance Spearman were illustrated with stunning photographs instead of drawings, giving them the uniqueness, creative flair and do-it-yourself spirit common throughout Africa. They preceded the explosion of Blaxploitation in America in the 1970s and its budget conscious DIY techniques were the precursors of modern Nollywood movie making.

== See also ==
- African Film (magazine), the magazine in which the series was published.
- James R. A. Bailey
