= Nirendranath Chakravarty =

Bengali poet (1924–2018)

- নীরেন্দ্রনাথ চক্রবর্তী
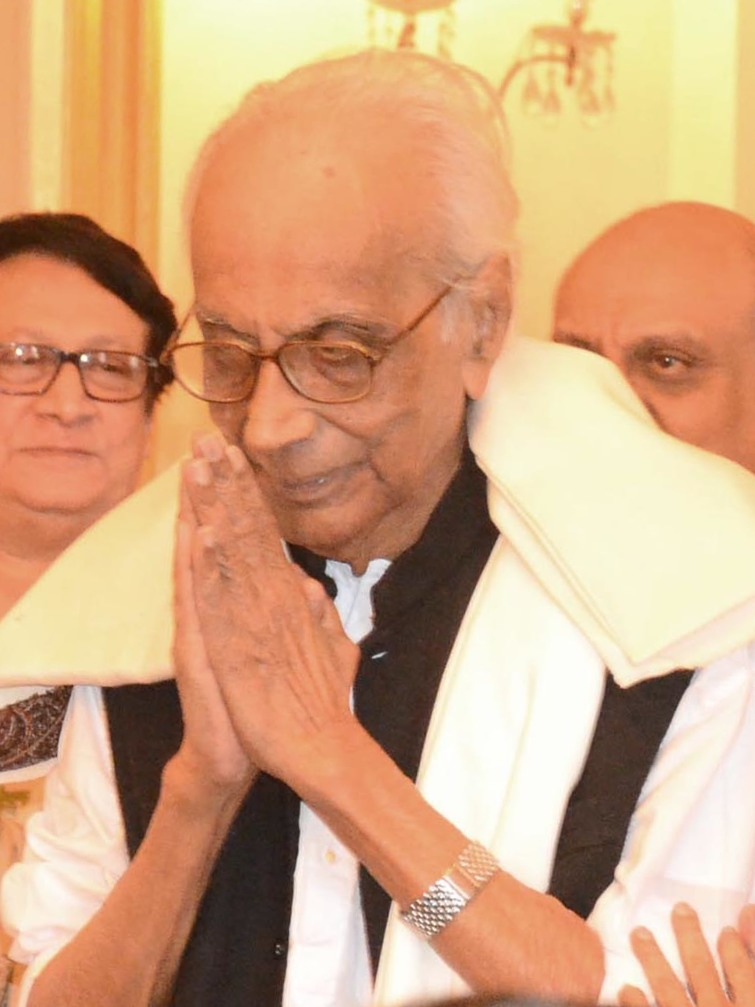
- Nirendranath in 2012
- Born: 19 October 1924; Faridpur, Bengal Presidency, British India (now in Bangladesh)
- Died: 25 December 2018 (aged 94); Kolkata, West Bengal, India
- Occupations: Writer, poet, author
- Awards: Sahitya Academy Award(1974), Banga Bibhushan (2017)

Nirendranath Chakravarty or Chakroborty (Bengali pronunciation: [/niɾend̪ɾonat̪ʰ/]; 19 October 1924 – 25 December 2018) was an Indian Bengali poet, novelist, and essayist. He's known for use of expressive clarity and sharp diction in his poems. He taught Bengali poetics in books like Kobitar Class, and created the fictional detective Mr. Bhaduri. In addition, he translated Hergé's The Adventures of Tintin in Bengali. He was long time editor of Anandamela, a children's magazine. In 1974, he received the Sahitya Akademi Award for the poetry collection Ulanga Raja.

His best-known poems include Ulanga Raja (The Naked King), Kolkatar Jishu (The Jesus of Kolkata), and Kolghore Chiler Kanna (A Hawk’s Wailing in the Bathroom). According to Subodh Sarkar in Desh, Ulanga Raja has entered the collective memory of Bengalis, alongside Tagore’s "Africa" and Kazi Nazrul Islam's "Bidrohi" ("The Rebel"). He lived in Bangur Avenue, Kolkata.

== Biography ==
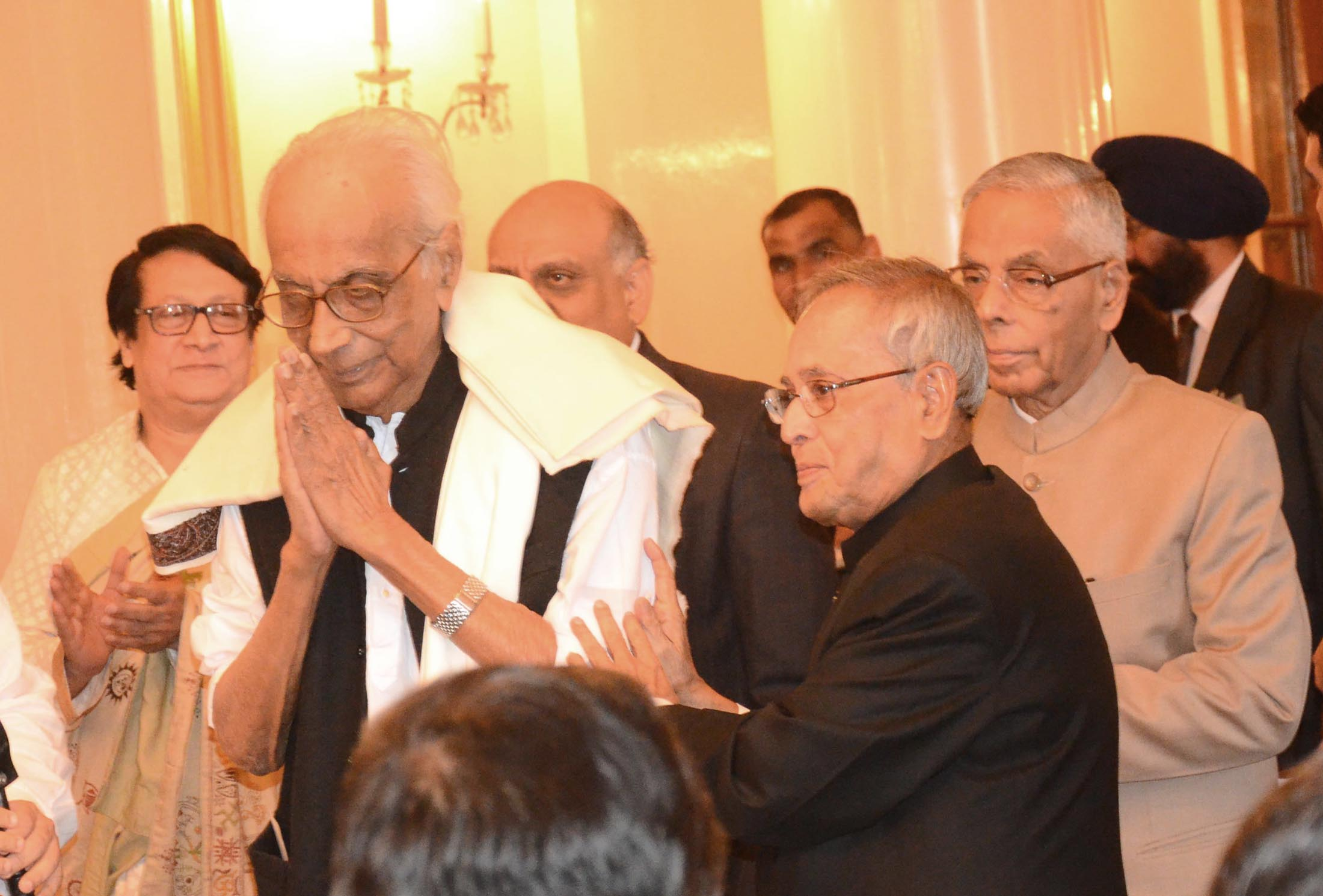
Nirendranath Chakraborty receiving Sunil Gangopadhyay Memorial Award 2012 (Kolkata, 2014)

He was born in Faridpur district of undivided Bengal in 1924. After graduating from the University of Calcutta, he started journalism in the daily "Raiyah". He won the Sahitya Academy Award in 1974 for the book of poems Ulanga Raja (The Naked King). In 2007, the University of Calcutta awarded him an honorary Doctor of Literature degree. He participated in the Festival of India in France and the USSR for literature translation. Nirendranath wrote several detective novels with Bhaduri Moshai as the central character and participated in the International Conference of Poets in Liege in 1990. He was the president of Paschimbanga Bangla Akademi.

== Notable works ==
=== Poetry collections ===
- Neel Nirjan, 1954
- Andhokar Baranda, 1961
- Prothom Nayok, 1961
- Nirokto Karabi, 1965
- kobitar bodole kobita, 1976
- Somoy borho kom, 1984
- Jabotiyo Valobasi, 1987
- Ghumiye porar aage
- Ghumiye porar age, 1987
- Cholliser dinguli, 1994
- Shotyo Shelukash, 1995
- Onno Gopal, 1999
- Bhalobasa Mondobasha, 2003
- Shrestho Kobita
- Kobita Samagro 1
- Kobita Samagro 2

=== Juvenile literature ===
- Saada Bagh
- Bibir Chora
- Baaro Maser Chora
- Pitri Purush
- Amalkanti(baje poem)

=== Some of his popular poems are- ===
- Amalkanti Roddur Hotay Cheyachilo
- Kolkatar Jisu, 1969
- Ulanga Raja, 1971
- Pahari bichhe

=== His popular Translation- ===
He also translated Hergé's The Adventures of Tintin in Bengali.

== Death ==
Nirendranath had long suffered from age-related ailments, including respiratory issues. On 25 December 2018, at 12:25 p.m., he died following a cardiac arrest at a private hospital in Mukundapur. He was 94.

His body was placed at Rabindra Sadan for public tribute, then brought to his Bangur Avenue residence. He was cremated with full state honours at Nimtala Burning Ghat.

== Awards ==
- Sahitya Akademi Award in 1974 for Ulongo Raja
- Ananda Purashkar in 1974 for Ulongo Raja
- Received a literary scholarship to Brussels in 1989
- The University of Calcutta awarded him an honorary Doctor of Literature degree In 2007
