= Rolf Kalmuczak =

German author (1938–2007)

Rolf Kalmuczak (17 April 1938 in Nordhausen – 10 March 2007 in Garmisch-Partenkirchen) was a German author. He was an editor of daily papers, freelance contributor at Stern, lector and one of the authors of the Jerry Cotton series. Since 1966 he had used more than 100 pseudonyms, written some 160 youth books, 36 film scripts, 170 paperback crime novels, and 200 booklet-novels. He admits that he wrote the TKKG book series as "Stefan Wolf". Rolf Kalmuczak was married with one daughter and lived in Garmisch-Partenkirchen.

== Pseudonyms ==
- Joe Adler
- Claus Alden
- Thomas Alden
- Ralf Berger
- Don Boston
- Frank Burger
- Fred Burger
- Ralph Burger
- Red Burger
- John Cain
- Ray Carson
- Henry Carter
- Norbert Clausen
- Pat Clifford
- Cliff Collins
- Glenn Collins
- Christian Conradi
- Cliff Corner
- Jerry Cotton
- Cecil Count
- Perry Dayton
- Sefton Deal
- Ralph Decker
- Harry Delson
- Cliff Dexter
- Herb Diery
- Mike Donner
- Alec B. Dorn
- I. Dorn
- Frank Douglas
- Lionel Dust
- Sebastian Eich
- Robert Falck
- Hector Falk
- Robert Falk
- Pierre Farot
- Helga Fechner
- Claus Fellner
- Jean-Pierre Ferrer
- Henri Ferrier
- Georg Fleiden
- Tobby Hammer
- Jörg Heldt
- Martin Hillenburg
- Bert Hillsen
- Norbert Hofberg
- Udo Horsten
- Pierre Jolas
- Robbie Kellog
- Robert Kellog
- Thomas Kolber
- Frank Lambert
- Tony Lambert
- Robert Loewen
- Michael Martin
- Phil Moreno
- Thomas Ness
- Tim Norden
- Henry Orlik
- Jens Orlik
- Frank Orloff
- Ted Owens
- Fred Parker
- Robert Paulsen
- Fred Plogau
- Ross Randall
- Rolf Reiher
- Simon Remple
- Peter Schadeck
- Siggi Seon
- Claus Stein
- Sebastian Stern
- Erik Stettner
- Evan Surbank
- Martin Tänzer
- Peter Trenk
- Allan Turner
- Marcello Venerdi
- Martin Vondrey
- Thomas Wank
- Tim Wells
- Martin Welz
- Stefan Welz
- Thas Welz
- Thomas Welz
- Michael Wilkow
- Stefan Wolf
- Bert Wolfgarten

== Best-known works ==
The best-known works of the author published under the alias Stefan Wolf are the following youth book series:

- "Ein Fall für TKKG"
- "Tom und Locke"
- "Der Magier und das Power-Trio"
- "Der Puma und seine Freunde"
