= Niladri Sarkar =

Colonel Niladri Sarkar
- Colonel character
- First appearance: Chaya Pore
- Last appearance: Hu-Humba Rahasya
- Created by: Syed Mustafa Siraj

In-universe information
- Full name: Niladri Sarkar
- Gender: Male
- Title: Colonel
- Occupation: Retired Colonel; Nature Specialist
- Nationality: Indian
- Aquantances: Jayanta; Detective Haldarmashai; Shasthi Charan
- Residence: Elliot Road, Kolkata

Niladri Sarkar or Colonel Niladri Sarkar is a fictional detective character created by Bengali novelist Syed Mustafa Siraj. Some of the Colonel stories written for children were translated into English. Best selling detective series.

== Character ==
Niladri Sarkar is a retired Colonel of the Indian Army, jovial and looking like Santa Claus. He introduces himself as a naturologist, butterfly collector and ornithologist. The Colonel smokes cigars and is fond of coffee. He has a trademark Hat and typically uses a walking stick for concealing weapons. Most of the Colonel stories are narrated by Jayanta Chowdhury, a reporter of Dainik Satyasebak Patrika. Jayanta is a lazy journalist who accompanies him on his missions. Sometimes Mr. K. K. Halder, a bit eccentric retired police officer also joins with colonel Sarkar. Colonel likes quoting Bengali proverbs and nursery rhymes. He maintains a good temperament while solving mystery. Colonel solves complex cases in his own ingenious way.

== Stories ==
The first story of Colonel Niladri Sarkar 'Chaya Pore' was published serially in Amrit Magazine in 1970. Thereafter Siraj wrote hundreds of stories for teen and adults. Some of are:

- Sabuj Sanket
- Kuashay Mrityur Ghran
- Pargacha
- Faand
- Ziro Ziro Ziro
- Sonar Damru
- Khokon Gelo Mach Dhorte
- Janalar Nichey Ekta Lok
- Prem Hatya Ebong Colonel
- Trishule Rokter Daag
- Kalo Pathor
- Dui Nari
- Hangor
- Patal Khondok
- Sundar Bivisika
- Macbeth'er Dainira
- Swarger Bahon
- Bigroho Rahasya
- Daniel Kuthir Hatya Rahasya
- Kakcharitra
- Kokodwiper Bivisika
- Panther Rahasya
- Manushkhekor Faand
- Tibbati Guptabidya
- Arunachaler Yeti
- Chiramburur Guptadhan
- Kalo Bakser Rahasya
- Toradwiper Voyonkor
- Tupir Karchupi
- Turuper Taas
- Alexanderer Bantul
- Bole Gechen Ram Shanna
- Kodondo Paharer Ba Rahasya
- Vimgarher Kalo Daityo
- Padmar Chore Voyonkor
- Vuture Ek Kaktarua
- Pretatma O Valuk Rahasya
- Batrisher Dhandha
- Rajbarir Chitro Rohasya
- Toy Pistol
- Vutrakkhos
- Jekhane Colonel
- Raja Salomoner Angti
- Sandhyanire Andhokar
- Kingbodontir Shankhochur
- Lohagarar Durbasa Muni
- Gurgin Khar Deoal
- Damrudihir Vut
- Kalo Kukur
- Ghatotkocher Jagoron
- Tibbati Guptobidya
- Ozraker Panja

== Adaptation ==
In 2013 a film Colonel was released under the direction of Raja Sen. Chiranjeet played the titular role and Saheb Chatterjee played as Jayanta.
