= Dipak Chatterjee =

Fictional Bengali people

- First appearance: Adrishya Sanket
- Created by: Swapankumar
- Portrayed by: Abir Chatterjee

In-universe information
- Title: Chatterjee (Chattopadhyay)
- Occupation: Private Investigator
- Religion: Hinduism
- Home: Bhawanipore, Kolkata
- Nationality: Indian
- Height: 6 ft 0 in (1.83 m)
- Assistant: Ratanlal

Dipak Chatterjee is a fictional detective character created by Bengali writer Samarendranath Pandey under his pen name Swapan Kumar. His stories were well known in the subaltern culture of Kolkata and most popular pulp fiction to readers of Bengali literature.

== Character ==
The first story of Dipak Chatterjee, Adrishya Sanket, was published in 1953. Dipak is a private investigator of Kolkata, British India. The police often seek help from him. Adventurous Dipak even goes abroad for solving cases. He can use revolvers with both hands and a dagger in his teeth and is an expert in martial arts. Dipak has profound scientific knowledge and has set up a laboratory in his house to carry out scientific experiments. His assistant, Ratanlal, usually accompanies him. Most of the stories are set in colonial Bengal. A total of 20 series of Dipak Chatterjee stories were published over three decades.

== Selected series ==
- Rahasya Kuhelika series
- Crime World series
- Dragon series
- Bajpakhi Series
- Biswachakra series
- Kalrudra series
- Kalnagini series
- Kalo Nekde series

== Adaptation ==
- Pradipta Bhattacharya, a National Award-winning Bengali filmmaker wants to make a films based on the story of Dipak Chatterjee. According to the director there were some copyright related problems.
- The leading Bengali OTT platform Hoichoi, has released a movie Shri Swapankumarer Badami Hyenar Kobole, directed by Debaloy Bhattacharya. There, the role of Dipak Chatterjee was played by Abir Chatterjee and the role of the writer Swapankumar was played by Paran Bandyopadhyay. It was released on 12 January 2024.
