= Syed Mustafa Siraj =

Indian writer (1930–2012)

- সৈয়দ মুস্তাফা সিরাজ
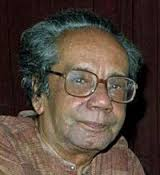
- Syed Mustafa Siraj
- Pronunciation: [ʃoi̯ɔd̪ must̪apʰa ʃiɾad͡ʒ]
- Born: 14 October 1930; Murshidabad, Bengal Presidency, British India
- Died: 4 September 2012 (aged 81); Kolkata, West Bengal, India
- Education: Berhampore College
- Occupations: Writer; journalist
- Spouse: Hasne Ara Siraj
- Children: Amitabha Siraj; Abhijit Siraj; Anita Siraj; Anindita Siraj
- Parent(s): Syed Abdur Rahman Ferdausi (father); Anwara Begum (mother)
- Writing career
- Pen name: Iblis
- Language: Bengali
- Years active: 1962–2012
- Period: Contemporary
- Genres: Short story; novel; detective fiction; horror fiction; essay; poetry
- Notable works: Aleek Manush; Neel Gharer Nati (1966); Colonel Niladri Sarkar; Amartya Premkatha (1988); Trinabhumi; Inspector Bramha; Bhautik Galpa Samagra; Tara Ashariri
- Notable awards: Sahitya Akademi Award; Bankim Puraskar; Bhuyalka Puraskar; Ananda Puraskar

Syed Mustafa Siraj (Note: Bengali: সৈয়দ মুস্তাফা সিরাজ, Bengali pronunciation: [ʃoi̯ɔd̪ must̪apʰa ʃiɾad͡ʒ].) (14 October 1930 – 4 September 2012) was an Indian author. In 1994, he received the Sahitya Akademi Award for his novel Aleek Manush. In 2005, his short story Ranirghater Brittanto was adapted into the film Faltu by Anjan Das. His oeuvre consists of some 150 novels and 300 short stories. In detective fiction, he is the creator of Colonel Niladri Sarkar, also known as "Goenda Colonel".

== Life and works ==
Siraj was born into a Bengali Muslim family in Khoshbaspur village in the district of Murshidabad in 1930. He grew up in a home with a strong literary background surrounded by books and familiarity with several languages including Arabic, Persian and Sanskrit. His mother who wrote poetry was influential. In his youth he was involved with Leftist politics and was active with the folk drama group Aalkaap for six years (1950–56) where he played the flute and was a teacher of folk dance and drama. He traveled rural West Bengal including the districts of Murshidabad, Malda, Burdwan, Birbhum and also performed in Kolkata. In those days, he used to perform whole nights and sleep during the day. These experiences would influence his later writing.

One day he got tired of this life and felt he had a wider life spreading around him. He turned to writing poetry and short stories. Later he came to Kolkata and entered the world of serious writings and immediately became famous for his short stories. "Inti, Pisi O Ghatbabu", "Bhalobasa O Down Train" (his first story that was published in Desh, 1962), "Hijal Biler Rakhalera" and "Taranginir Chokh" brought fame for him. He joined a Bengali daily newspaper and worked as a journalist for years. He wrote around 150 novels and 300 short stories. His short stories "Uro Pakhir Chhaya", "Manusher Janma", "Ranabhumi", "Rakter Pratyasha", "Maati", "Goghna", and "Mrityur Ghora" immediately attracted Bengali readers and intellectuals.

His first novel is Neel Gharer Nati (1966), it is about a village performer forced into the profession by her father, it received critical acclaim. His best known novel is Aleek Manush (Mythical Man), which won the Sahitya Akademi Award (1994), the Bankim Puraskar, and has been translated into eleven Indian languages. He also won the Narasimha Das Memorial Award for his novel Amartya Premkatha (1988). His novels Nishimrigaya (1970) and Krishna Bari Phereni (1980) have been filmed in Bengali. Also his famous short story named Ranir Ghater Brittanta was screen played as Faltu (2006) in Bengali language. In the next year, this film was selected for the National Film Awards. Other notable novels include Trinabhumi, Kingbadantir Nayak, and Uttar Jahnabi; Trinabhumi was translated into all major Indian languages. His short stories "Mrityur Ghora", "Rakter Pratyasha", "Goghna" and many others have been translated into different Indian languages Hindi, Urdu and Tamil.

He is the creator of the detective character "Colonel Niladri Sarkar. Colonel Sarkar is the hero who finds the culprit or killer. The stories are very popular earning Siraj a dedicated fan following. From children to old people, there are huge number of readers who are fond of Colonel Niladri Sarkar. The retired colonel is the eccentric sleuth in Syed Mustafa Siraj's stories, narrated by a lazy journalist of Dainik Satyasebak Patrika, Jayanta, who accompanies him on his missions. Sometimes Mr. K.K. Halder, retired police officer also accompanied the colonel Sarkar. The colonel is a butterfly collector and ornithologist, smokes pipes and has a Santa beard. He is also jovial and likes quoting Bengali proverbs & nursery rhymes. The Blogus blog displays first-published illustrations from the first Colonel Niladri Sarkar novel Chhaaya Pawrey.

Siraj did not start his career writing for children until later in life. His reputation was built on writing novels and short stories for adults. He started writing for children to respond the huge demand for that genre in Bengali.

Other works :

- Bedbati
- Devi Athenar Pratna Rahasya
- Ghor Songhshar
- NISHILATA
- SWAPNER NICHE DARIYE
- SWARNACHAMPAR UPAKHYAN
- SHANKHAGARER VAMPIRE RAHASYA
- Kathamala
- Inspector Brahmer 7 Tadanta
- Janapad Janapath

== English translations ==
Not much of Siraj has been translated into English. In 2004, Delhi University professor Nivedita Sen translated some of Siraj's popular stories written for children that featured the detective Colonel Niladri, the collection is called The Colonel Investigates. In 2012, Sen translated Die, Said the Tree and Other Stories, a collection of 10 short stories.

In 2005, Aleek Manush was translated as Mythical Man.

In 2023, "Bharat Varsha": A blog post by studycirclelokayata.blog mentions that one of his less celebrated but powerful short stories, "Bharat Varsha," has also been translated into English by Saukarya Samad (Saukarya Samad is an MA student of History at the University of Delhi).

== Film adaptations based on work ==
- Faltu (2006)
- Chandragrohon (2008)
- Brihonnola (2014)
- Teenkahon (2014)
- Maya Mridanga (2016)
- Dharmajuddha (2021)

== Awards ==
- Sahitya Akademi Award
- Bankim Puraskar
- Bhuyalka Puraskar
- Ananda Puraskar
