= Sasthipada Chattopadhyay =

Bengali writer (1941–2023)

- Born: 9 March 1941; Sasthitala, Howrah District, Bengal Presidency, British India
- Died: 3 March 2023 (aged 81); Howrah, West Bengal, India
- Education: University of Calcutta
- Occupations: Novelist, writer
- Writing career
- Language: Bengali
- Notable works: Pandab Goenda, Goenda Tatar
- Notable awards: Bal Sahitya Puraskar (2017)

Sasthipada Chattopadhyay (9 March 1941 – 3 March 2023) was an Indian novelist and short story writer in Bengali. He is well known in Bengali literature for the series stories of Pandab Goenda.

== Life and career ==
Chattopadhyay was born in Khurut, Sasthitala in Howrah district on 9 March 1941. He published his first literary work Kamakhya Bhraman in Dainik Basumati in 1961 and started working at Anandabazar Patrika under the guidance of Ramapada Chowdhury and Sagarmoy Ghosh. Chattopadhyay worked at Rabibasoryo, Anandabazar starting in 1961. In the meantime, he joined the Indian Railway and was posted at Ghatshila. He wrote many novels, travelogue, and short stories, but became popular and gained recognition for the creation of Pandab Goenda, an adventure detective series for children. Pandab Goenda was later realised on television in animated form. He loved to explore countries and have experiences which are reflected in most of the stories. Chattopadhyay created two more detective series, namely Detective Ambar Chatterjee and Goenda Tatar. He wrote hundred of detective and adventure stories. The story of his creation of Tatar was filmed as Goyenda Tatar in 2019.

Chattopadhyay died from a stroke on 3 March 2023, at age 81.

== Works ==
- Pandab Goenda (Series)
- Sonar Ganapati Hirer Chokh
- Chaturtha Tadanta
- Goenda Tatarer Avijaan
- Panchti Rahasyo Goenda
- Sera Rahasyo 25
- Sera Goenda 25
- Panchaasti Bhuter Golpo
- Aaro Panchaasti Bhuter Golpo
- Debdasi Tirtha
- Kingbadantir Bikramaditya
- Punyatirthe Bhraman
- Kedarnath
- Himalayer Noy Devi

== Award ==
Chattopadhyay was awarded Bal Sahitya Puraskar in 2017 by the Sahitya Akademi for his contribution to children's literature in Bengali.
