= List of mystery writers =

Mystery fiction is a genre in which the nature of an event, usually a murder or other crime, remains mysterious until the end of the story.

== A–B ==
- Megan Abbott (born 1971)
- Christine Adamo (born 1965)
- Harriet Stratemeyer Adams (pseudonyms: Carolyn Keene, Franklin W. Dixon) (1892–1982)
- Jane Adams (born 1960)
- Ginny Aiken (born 1955)
- Joan Aiken (1924–2004)
- Catherine Aird (1930–2024)
- Jirō Akagawa (born 1948)
- Susan Wittig Albert
- Bruce Alexander Cook (pseudonym: Bruce Alexander) (1932–2003)
- Goldie Alexander
- Shana Alexander (1925–2005)
- Tasha Alexander (born 1969)
- Margery Allingham (1904–1966)
- Karin Alvtegen (born 1965)
- James Anderson (1936–2007)
- Lin Anderson
- Donna Andrews
- Sarah Andrews
- Gosho Aoyama (born 1963)
- Charles Ardai (born 1969)
- Charlotte Armstrong (1905–1969)
- Robert Arthur (1909–1969)
- Taku Ashibe (born 1958)
- Isaac Asimov (1920–1992)
- Kate Atkinson (born 1951)
- Rosemary Aubert
- Bunty Avieson (born 1962)
- Yukito Ayatsuji (born 1960)
- Marian Babson (1929–2017)
- Deb Baker (born 1953)
- David Baldacci (born 1960)
- Donna Ball (born 1951)
- Blue Balliett (born 1955)
- Jo Bannister (born 1951)
- Robert Barnard (1936–2013)
- Linda Barnes (born 1949)
- Nevada Barr (born 1952)
- Lynne Barrett
- Earle Basinsky
- Bernard Bastable (pseudonym for Robert Barnard)
- Belinda Bauer (born 1962)
- William Bayer (born 1939)
- K.K. Beck (born 1950)
- Jean Bedford (1946–2025)
- Josephine Bell (1897–1987)
- Robert Leslie Bellem (1902–1968)
- C.C. Benison (pseudonym for Douglas Whiteway) (born 1961)
- James R. Benn (born 1949)
- Margot Bennett (1912–1980)
- Laurien Berenson
- William Bernhardt
- Lauren Beukes (born 1976)
- Anthony Bidulka (born 1962)
- Claudia Bishop (pseudonym for Mary Stanton) (born 1947)
- Cara Black (born 1951)
- Nicholas Blake (1904–1972)
- Eleanor Taylor Bland (1944–2010)
- Clair Blank (1915–1965)
- Lawrence Block (born 1938)
- Enid Blyton (1897–1968)
- Geraldine Bonner (1870–1930)
- Gail Bowen (born 1942)
- Peter Bowen (1945–2020)
- Rhys Bowen (pseudonym for Janet Quin-Harkin) (born 1941)
- Christianna Brand (1907–1988)
- Lilian Jackson Braun (1913–2011)
- Fredric Brown (1906–1972)
- Rita Mae Brown (born 1944)
- Sandra Brown (born 1948)
- Robert Gregory Browne (born 1955)
- Leo Bruce (1903–1979)
- Edna Buchanan (born 1939)
- Marie Buchanan (1922–2010)
- Fiona Buckley (1937–2024)
- Jan Burke (born 1953)
- Gwendoline Butler (1922–2013)

== C ==
- James M. Cain (1892–1977)
- Janet Caird (1913–1992)
- Karen Campbell (born 1967)
- Joanna Cannan (1898–1961)
- Dorothy Cannell (born 1943)
- Victor Canning (1911–1986)
- Patricia Carlon (1927–2002)
- John Dickson Carr (1905–1977)
- Margaret Carr (born 1935) (pseudonyms: Martin Carroll, Carole Kerr, Belle Jackson)
- Felicity Winifred Carter (1906–1995)
- John Case (pseudonym of Jim Hougan and Carolyn Hougan)
- Kathryn Casey
- Vera Caspary (1899–1987)
- Richard Castle (pseudonym for ghostwriter)
- Sarah Caudwell (1939–2000)
- Jessie Chandler (born 1968))
- Raymond Chandler (1888–1959)
- Kate Charles (born 1950)
- Marion Chesney (1936–2019)
- G. K. Chesterton (1874–1936)
- Jennifer Chiaverini (born 1969)
- Chin Shunshin (1924–2015)
- Agatha Christie (1890–1976)
- Jill Churchill (1943–2023)
- Carol Higgins Clark (1956–2023)
- Mary Higgins Clark (1927–2020)
- Anna Clarke (1919–2004)
- Brian Cleeve (1921–2003)
- Ann Cleeves (born 1954)
- Jane Cleland
- Judy Clemens (born 1969)
- Barbara Cleverly
- Liza Cody (born 1944)
- Margaret Coel (born 1937)
- Kate Collins
- Max Allan Collins (born 1948)
- Michael Collins (pseudonym for Dennis Lynds) (1924–2005)
- Wilkie Collins (1824–1889)
- Susan Conant
- Michael Connelly (born 1956)
- J. J. Connington (1880–1947)
- Sheila Connolly (1950–2020)
- Patricia Cornwell (born 1956)
- Frances Cowen (pseudonym: Eleanor Hyde) (1915–1992)
- Katherine Cowley
- Cleo Coyle
- Frances Crane (1896–1981)
- Edmund Crispin (1921–1978)
- Deborah Crombie (born 1952)
- Amanda Cross (pseudonym for Carolyn Heilbrun) (1926–2003)
- Chris Culver

== D–F ==
- Barbara D'Amato (born 1938)
- Jordan Dane (born 1953)
- Ray Daniel
- Denise Danks
- Diane Mott Davidson (born 1949)
- Carol Anne Davis (born 1961)
- Dorothy Salisbury Davis (1916–2014)
- Lindsey Davis (born 1949)
- Janet Dawson (born 1949)
- Marele Day (born 1947)
- Jeffery Deaver (born 1950)
- Miriam Allen deFord (1888–1975)
- Vicki Delany (born 1951)
- Randall Denley
- August Derleth (1909–1971)
- P. T. Deutermann (born 1941)
- Eileen Dewhurst (born 1929)
- Colin Dexter (1930–2017)
- Charles Dickens (1812–1870)
- Peter Dickinson (1927–2015)
- Doris Miles Disney (1907–1976)
- Franklin W. Dixon
- Joanne Dobson (born 1942)
- David Dodge (1910–1974)
- Thea Dorn (born 1970)
- Carole Nelson Douglas (1944–2021)
- Jennifer Dowdell (pseudonym: Nikki Baker) (born 1962)
- Sir Arthur Conan Doyle (1859–1930)
- June Drummond (1923–2011)
- Tananarive Due (born 1966)
- Stella Duffy (born 1963)
- Sarah Dunant (born 1950)
- C. M. Eddy Jr. (1896–1967)
- Edogawa Ranpo (1894–1965)
- Martin Edwards (born 1955)
- Kerstin Ekman (born 1933)
- Amelia Ellis (born 1977)
- J.T. Ellison
- James Ellroy (born 1948)
- Ben Elton (born 1959)
- Kathy Lynn Emerson
- Maggie Estep (1963–2014)
- Loren D. Estleman (born 1952)
- Janet Evanovich (born 1943)
- Elizabeth Eyre (pseudonym for Jill Staynes and Margaret Storey)
- Terence Faherty (born 1954)
- Linda Fairstein (born 1947)
- Diane Fanning (born 1950)
- Jerrilyn Farmer
- Charles Finch (born 1980)
- Rudolph Fisher (1897–1934)
- Mary Fitt (pseudonym for Kathleen Freeman) (1897–1959)
- Joanne Fluke (born 1943)
- Gillian Flynn (born 1971)
- Rae Foley (1900–1978) (pseudonym for Elinor Denniston, who also wrote as Helen K. Maxwell and Dennis Allan)
- Elena Forbes
- Richard S. Forrest (1932–2005)
- Karin Fossum (born 1954)
- Earlene Fowler (born 1954)
- Barbara Fradkin
- Ariana Franklin (pseudonym for Diana Norman) (1933–2011)
- Miles Franklin (1879–1954)
- Antonia Fraser (born 1932)
- Anthea Fraser (born 1930)
- Margaret Frazer (pseudonym for Gail Frazer and Mary Monica Pulver Kuhfeld) (1946–2013)
- R. Austin Freeman (1862–1943)
- Celia Fremlin (1914–2009)
- Inger Frimansson (born 1944)
- Gayleen Froese (born 1972)
- Frances Fyfield (born 1948)

== G–J ==
- Leighton Gage (1942–2013)
- Gillian Galbraith
- Menna Gallie (1920–1990)
- Carolina Garcia-Aguilera (born 1949)
- Erle Stanley Gardner (1889 –1970)
- Lisa Gardner (born 1971)
- Roberta Gellis (1927–2016)
- Anne George (1927–2001)
- Elizabeth George (born 1949)
- Tess Gerritsen (born 1953)
- Michael Gilbert (1912–2006)
- Leslie Glass
- Alan Gordon (born 1959)
- Alison Gordon (1943–2015)
- Dolores Gordon-Smith (born 1958)
- Steven Gore
- Joe Gores (1931–2011)
- Gary Goshgarian
- Nancy Grace (born 1959)
- Sue Grafton (1940–2017)
- Caroline Graham (born 1931)
- Sara Gran (born 1971)
- Ann Granger (1939–2025)
- Alex Gray (born 1950)
- Anna Katharine Green (1846–1935)
- John M. Green (born 1953)
- Kerry Greenwood (1954–2025)
- Dorien Grey (1933–2015)
- Martha Grimes (born 1931)
- John Grisham (born 1955)
- Beth Groundwater
- Elizabeth Gunn
- Jane Haddam (1951–2019)
- Parnell Hall (1944–2020)
- Brett Halliday (1904–1977)
- Bruce Barrymore Halpenny (1937–2015)
- Dashiell Hammett (1894–1961)
- Jane Harper (born 1980)
- Charlaine Harris (born 1951)
- Carolyn G. Hart (born 1936)
- Ellen Hart (born 1949)
- J. M. Hayes
- Sylvia Haymon (1918−1995)
- Cheryl A. Head
- Georgette Heyer (1902–1974)
- Keigo Higashino (born 1958)
- Patricia Highsmith (1921–1995)
- Donna Hill
- Reginald Hill (1936–2012)
- Tony Hillerman (1925–2008)
- Chester Himes (1909–1984)
- Genevieve Holden (pseudonym of Genevieve Pou) (1919–2007)
- Elisabeth Sanxay Holding (1889–1955)
- Kay Hooper (born 1958)
- Ernest William Hornung (1866–1921)
- Charlotte Hughes (born 1954)
- Dorothy B. Hughes (1904–1993)
- Gwen Hunter
- Ibn-e-Safi (1928–1980)
- Greg Iles (1960–2025)
- Michael Innes (1906–1994)
- Kotaro Isaka (born 1971)
- P. D. James (1920–2014)
- J. A. Jance (born 1944)
- Charlotte Jay (1919–1996)
- Linda O. Johnston
- Stan Jones (born 1947)

== L–M ==
- Stuart M. Kaminsky (1934–2009)
- Alex Kava (born 1960)
- H. R. F. Keating (1926–2011)
- Carolyn Keene
- Faye Kellerman (born 1952)
- Jonathan Kellerman (born 1949)
- Nora Kelly (born 1945)
- Harry Kemelman (1908–1996)
- David Kessler (born 1957)
- Karen Kijewski (born 1943)
- Laurie R. King (born 1952)
- Natsuo Kirino (born 1951)
- Kenzo Kitakata (born 1947)
- Kazuhiro Kiuchi (born 1960)
- Minerva Koenig (born 1960)
- Carl Kosak (pseudonym: K. C. Constantine) (1934–2023)
- William Kent Krueger (born 1950)
- Ken Kuhlken
- Michael Kurland (born 1938)
- Natsuhiko Kyogoku (born 1963)
- Lori L. Lake (born 1960)
- Virginia Lanier (1930–2003)
- Gaston Leroux (1868–1927)
- Paul Levine (born 1948)
- Will Levinrew (1881–1951)
- Paul Levinson (born 1947)
- Beverly Lewis
- Laura Lippman (born 1959)
- S. E. Lister (born 1988)
- Peter Lovesey (1936–2025)
- Kyra Davis Lurie (born 1972)
- Dennis Lynds (1924–2005)
- John D. MacDonald (1916–1986)
- Marianne Macdonald (1934–2019)
- Philip MacDonald (1900–1980)
- Ross Macdonald (1915–1983)
- Charlotte MacLeod (1922–2005)
- Michael Mallory (born 1955)
- Stephen Marley
- Margaret Maron (1938–2021)
- Ngaio Marsh (1895–1982)
- Edward Marston (pseudonym for Keith Miles)
- Sujata Massey (born 1964)
- Seicho Matsumoto (1909–1992)
- Peter May (born 1951)
- Ed McBain (1926–2005)
- James McClure (1939–2006)
- Sharyn McCrumb (born 1948)
- Val McDermid (born 1955)
- Gregory Mcdonald (1937–2008)
- Michael McGarrity (born 1939)
- Mary McMullen (1920–1986) (pseudonym for Mary Reilly)
- Penny Mickelbury (born 1948)
- Zygmunt Miłoszewski (born 1976)
- Gladys Mitchell (1901–1983)
- Kirk Mitchell (born 1950)
- Miyuki Miyabe (born 1960)
- Christopher G. Moore (born 1952)
- John Mortimer (1923–2009)
- Walter Mosley (born 1952)
- J. E. Preston Muddock (1843–1934)
- Marcia Muller (born 1944)
- Margaret Murphy (born 1959)
- Beverle Graves Myers (born 1951)

== N–Q ==
- Fuminori Nakamura (born 1977)
- Phyllis Reynolds Naylor (born 1933)
- Barbara Neely (1941-2020)
- Jo Nesbø (born 1960)
- Katherine Neville (born 1945)
- Etsuko Niki (1928–1986)
- Lisa de Nikolits
- Kyotaro Nishimura (1930–2022)
- Asa Nonami (born 1960)
- Rintaro Norizuki (born 1964)
- Suzanne North (born 1945)
- Joyce Carol Oates (born 1938)
- T. Lynn Ocean
- Rodica Ojog-Brașoveanu (1939–2002)
- Kido Okamoto (1872–1939)
- Baroness Orczy (1865–1947)
- Go Osaka (born 1943)
- Arimasa Osawa (born 1956)
- Otsuichi (born 1978)
- Bernadette Pajer
- Sara Paretsky (born 1947)
- Barbara Parker (1946/1947–2009)
- Robert B. Parker (1932–2010)
- Hayford Peirce (1942–2020)
- Louise Penny (born 1958)
- Anne Perry (pseudonym for Juliet Hulme) (1938–2023)
- Elizabeth Peters (pseudonym for Barbara Mertz) (1927–2013)
- Ellis Peters (pseudonym for Edith Pargeter) (1913–1995)
- Gary Phillips (writer) (born 1955)
- Nancy Pickard (born 1945)
- Catherine Louisa Pirkis (1841–1910)
- Edgar Allan Poe (1809–1849)
- Barbara Corrado Pope (born 1941)
- Bill Pronzini (born 1943)
- Ellery Queen (pseudonym for Frederic Dannay and Manfred Lee), also wrote as Barnaby Ross
- Patrick Quentin (pseudonym for Hugh Wheeler and Richard Wilson Webb), also wrote as Quentin Patrick and Jonathan Stagge
- Qiu Xiaolong (born 1953)

== R–S ==
- Ian Rankin (born 1960)
- Ellen Raskin (1928–1984)
- Satyajit Ray (1921–1992)
- Jean M. Redmann (born 1955)
- Arthur J. Rees (1872–1942)
- Ruth Rendell (1930–2015)
- Jason Reynolds (born 1983)
- Craig Rice (pseudonym for Georgiana Ann Randolph Craig) (1908–1957)
- Mary Roberts Rinehart (1876–1958)
- J. D. Robb (pseudonym for Nora Roberts) (born 1950)
- Lynda S. Robinson (born 1951)
- Peter Robinson (1950–2022)
- James Rollins (born 1961)
- Audrey Roos (1912–1982) (pseudonym Kelley Roos; co-author with husband William Roos)
- William Roos (1911–1987) (pseudonyms William Rand and Kelley Roos; the latter in collaboration with his wife Audrey Roos)
- Barnaby Ross (pseudonym for Ellery Queen)
- Kate Ross (1956–1998)
- S. J. Rozan (born 1950)
- Garry Ryan
- Ryukishi07 (born 1974)
- Dorothy L. Sayers (1893–1957)
- Mark Schweizer (1956–2019)
- Sandra Scoppettone
- Will Scott (1893−1964)
- Lisa Scottoline (1956–2019)
- Lisa See
- Soji Shimada (born 1948)
- Celestine Sibley (1917–1999)
- Georges Simenon (1903–1989)
- Elizabeth Sims (born 1957)
- Marilyn Singer (born 1948)
- Karin Slaughter (born 1971)
- Julie Smith (born 1944)
- Lemony Snicket (born 1970)
- Donald J. Sobol (1924–2012)
- Maris Soule (born 1939)
- Ross H. Spencer (1921–1998)
- Julia Spencer-Fleming (born 1961)
- Mickey Spillane (1918–2006)
- Dana Stabenow (born 1952)
- Agnieszka Stelmaszyk (born 1978)
- Manning Lee Stokes (1911–1976)
- Rex Stout (1886–1975) the Nero Wolfe series
- John Straley (born 1953)
- Edward Stratemeyer (pseudonyms include Carolyn Keene and Franklin W. Dixon) (1862–1930)
- Sarah Strohmeyer
- George Szanto (born 1940)
- Mitzi Szereto

== T–Z ==
- Akimitsu Takagi (1920–1995)
- Katsuhiko Takahashi (born 1947)
- Tetsuo Takashima (born 1949)
- Bernard J. Taylor
- Josephine Tey (1896–1952)
- Jim Thompson (1906–1977)
- Masako Togawa (1931–2016)
- Camilla Trinchieri (1942)
- James Twining (born 1972)
- Arthur Upfield (1890–1964)
- Andrew Vachss (1942–2021)
- Jack Vance (1916–2013)
- Janwillem van de Wetering (1931–2008)
- Robert van Gulik (1910–1967)
- Elaine Viets
- Mark Haddon
- Minette Walters (born 1949)
- Ronald J Watkins (born 1945)
- Hillary Waugh (1920–2008)
- Martha G. Webb (1943–2021)
- Carl Weber (born 1964)
- Charlie Wells (1923–2004)
- Patricia Wentworth (1878–1961)
- Valerie Wilson Wesley (born 1947)
- Frank Atha Westbury (1838–1901)
- Jeri Westerson (born 1960)
- Donald Westlake (pseudonyms include Richard Stark) (1933–2008)
- Collin Wilcox (1924–1996)
- Margaret Wetherby Williams (pseudonym: Margaret Erskine) (1901–1984)
- Colson Whitehead (born 1969)
- Anne Wingate (pseudonyms include Lee Martin) (1943–2021)
- L. R. Wright (1939–2001)
- Willard Huntington Wright (pseudonym: S. S. Van Dine) (1888–1939)
- Yi Kŭmch'ŏl
- Seishi Yokomizo (1902–1981)
- Hideo Yokoyama (born 1957)
- Margaret Yorke (1924–2012)
- Shuichi Yoshida (born 1968)
- Kyusaku Yumeno (1889–1936)

== See also ==
- Mystery fiction
- List of female mystery writers
- List of crime writers
- List of thriller writers
- Lists of writers
