= Fishkill Correctional Facility =

Multi-security level prison in New York, US

Coordinates: 41°31′22″N 73°57′00″W

- Interactive map of Fishkill Correctional Facility
- Location: 18 Strack Drive Beacon, New York
- Status: open
- Security class: minimum, medium and maximum
- Capacity: 1800
- Opened: 1977
- Managed by: New York State Department of Corrections and Community Supervision

Fishkill Correctional Facility is a multi-security level prison in New York, United States. The prison is located in both the Town of Fishkill and the City of Beacon in Dutchess County. Fishkill was constructed in 1896. It began as the Matteawan State Hospital for the Criminally Insane.

As a minimum security facility, it houses both inmates that work outside the facility on behalf of the prison and inmates that are in the work release temporary release program. As a medium security facility it houses general population and Office of Mental Health inmates. As a maximum security facility it houses inmates under disciplinary segregation in the S-Block Special Housing Unit.

Fishkill also houses the Regional Medical Unit for Southern New York's prisons.

== History ==
The present facility is located on land originally purchased by the New York state government to build and operate Matteawan State Hospital for the Criminally Insane in 1892. Some of the original buildings are in use now at Fishkill. Matteawan ceased operation in 1977 and the facility was converted to its present use as a medium security prison for men. In 1998, a maximum security S-Block Special Housing Unit was added to the facility to hold 200 maximum security inmates that are under disciplinary segregation.

== Present day use ==
Fishkill houses approximately 1,800 inmates, operates as the Regional Medical Unit for southern New York's prisons, and offers a range of educational programs, including Pre-General Equivalency Diploma (Pre-GED), General Equivalency Diploma (GED), English as a Second Language (ESL), Associates of Arts in Liberal Arts through the Bard Prison Initiative, Bachelor of Science degree in Organizational Management through a partnership between Hudson Link for Higher Education in Prison and Nyack College. Available is the only Commercial Arts Program in a New York State prison. The facility also provides Alcohol and Substance Abuse Treatment (ASAT), Sex Offender Treatment, and various vocational programs. The Puppy Program assigns selected inmates (not all are eligible) a puppy who the inmate raises until the dog has learned basic skills and is taken away for more advanced training. In one small wing where puppy program participants live, puppies can be loose as a barricade prevents their reentry into the general area. Outside that area puppies have to be leashed. They were often walked outdoors.

There is an indoor basketball court, and in the basement a weight room, with inmate staff keeping track of equipment, which has to be checked out. There is sometimes a minyan (group of 10) for orthodox Jewish prayer.

The facility also houses the Fishkill Specialty Steel division of the Department of Corrections and Community Supervision's Corcraft Industries. Fishkill Specialty Steel gives inmate real world experience in welding and metal fabrication. The programs produces custom sheet metal products, classroom desks and various other items of steel that are used in schools across the state, prisons, mental health facilities, the Metropolitan Transportation Authority, and the New York City Department of Sanitation.

== Inmate demographics ==
In 2013 the prison inmate population consisted of;

- 1,650 people incarcerated; capacity 1,845
- 54% black; 27% Latino; 18% white
- 22% under 30; 26% 50+; 8% 60+
- Median age: 42.5
- Median minimum sentence: 102 months
- 71% convicted of violent felony
- 12% convicted of drug offense
- Median time at Fishkill 13 months
- Median time in DOCCS 11 years

== Therapeutic programs ==
Fishkill is one of six prisons that incorporate the Puppies Behind Bars program. Prison inmates raise puppies to be guide dogs for the blind, disabled children and adults, and fully trained service dogs for wounded soldiers coming home from Iraq and Afghanistan. Oprah Winfrey filmed a segment at Fishkill Correctional Facility on the prison's Puppies Behind Bars program.

The Corcraft program is a program that employs inmates to manufacture beds, chairs and computer furniture for sale to state and local governments. They also fabricate to-order heavy gauge specialty items such as security doors and windows for correctional and psychiatric institutions.

== Notable current and former inmates ==
- Daniel Genis
- Izola Curry
- G. Dep
- Robert F. Garrow
- Paul Geidel
- Robert Golub
- Black Rob
- Joseph "Mad Dog" Sullivan

== See also ==
- Matteawan State Hospital for the Criminally Insane
