= Fool Me Once =

Fool Me Once may refer to:

== Film and television ==
- "Fool Me Once..." (Castle), a 2009 television episode
- "Fool Me Once" (Escape Club), a 2014 television episode
- "Fool Me Once..." (Jungle Cubs), a 1996 television episode
- "Fool Me Once" (Orange Is the New Black), a 2013 television episode
- "Fool Me Once" (The Vampire Diaries), a 2010 television episode
- Fool Me Once, a 2006 short film featuring Sharon Lawrence
- Fool Me Once (TV series), a 2024 television adaptation of the 2016 Harlan Coben novel

== Literature ==
- Fool Me Once, a 2016 novel by Harlan Coben
- Fool Me Once, a 2005 novel by T. Lynn Ocean
- Fool Me Once, a 2011 nonfiction book by Rick Lax

== Songs ==
- "Fool Me Once", by B.B. King from There Is Always One More Time, 1991
- "Fool Me Once", by Bride from Silence Is Madness, 1989
- "Fool Me Once", by Burden of a Day from OneOneThousand, 2009
- "Fool Me Once", by Connie Hall, 1963
- "Fool Me Once", by Lindsey Webster, 2016
- "Fool Me Once", by One-Eyed Doll from Dirty, 2012

== Other ==
- "Fool me once...", the start of a traditional saying
- "Fool me once...", the start of a famous Bushism based on the earlier saying
