= Ray Daniel =

Ray Daniel may refer to:

- Ray Daniel (Welsh footballer) (1928–1997), Welsh football player and manager
- Ray Daniel (English footballer) (born 1964), English football player
- Ray Daniel (author) (born 1962), author of Boston-based crime fiction
