= Murder of Kelly Ann Tinyes =

1989 murder in Valley Stream, New York

Kelly Ann Tinyes
- Born: March 5, 1975
- Died: March 3, 1989 (aged 13); Valley Stream, New York, United States
- Cause of death: Homicide by strangulation
- Citizenship: United States
- Occupation: Student
- Known for: Murder victim

The murder of Kelly Ann Tinyes /TIN-uhs/ occurred on March 3, 1989. Tinyes was a thirteen-year-old Valley Stream, New York resident who was strangled, stabbed, and mutilated. Her body was discovered in the basement of her neighbor, twenty-one-year-old bodybuilder Robert Golub, who was charged with and convicted of her murder. Golub was convicted based on DNA evidence that showed that he matched the genetic markers found in a blood sample discovered on evidence. The trial was the first case in New York state to have a case won by DNA forensic evidence.

The case was re-opened on March 3, 2009, to investigate the possibility of an accomplice.

== Murder ==
On March 3, 1989, Kelly Tinyes was babysitting her younger brother Richard when he answered a phone call from someone identifying himself as "John" and asking to speak with Kelly. Shortly after speaking with the other person on the phone, Tinyes told her brother that she was going to go to a friend's house and that she would return shortly. After waiting a short period of time, Richard went to the friend's home and was told that Kelly had not been there. A neighbor child told Richard that he had seen Kelly go into the Golub house. Attempts by Richard to call the Golubs and to knock at their home were unsuccessful. His parents arrived home around 5pm and also attempted to locate Kelly, but were unsuccessful. A friend of Kelly's, Sharon Stonel, also commented that she had seen Kelly go into the Golubs' house. Two detectives visited the Golub house the following day and interviewed several members of the Golub family. The detectives later returned to the house and requested permission to search the property. After gaining permission from the senior John Golub, the detectives searched the home and found the body of Kelly Tinyes in the house's basement.

== Arrest, trial and incarceration ==
Robert Golub was charged with the murder of Kelly and brought to trial in late 1989 after a bloody handprint matching Golub's was discovered. His brother John Golub was suspected of being involved in the murder, but was never formally charged. During the trial Golub's lawyer Salvatore Marinello raised questions over the police search, saying that it was an improper and unlawful search, as well as questioning the DNA evidence's accuracy. Marinello argued that the DNA testing was unreliable, and that the testing process performed on the blood samples might be in question. A supervisor for the testing facility Lifecodes Corporation stated that "the tests on the blood samples were accurate, and asserted that the chances of the blood belonging to someone other than Robert Golub were 1 in 707 million."

On April 7, 1990, Golub was found guilty of second-degree murder and was sentenced to 25 years to life in prison. Golub attempted to appeal the decision, but was turned down. On November 18, 2013, while nearing completion of the 25 year minimum sentence for the crime, he had his first parole hearing. On November 25, he was denied. The parole board said releasing him early would be "incompatible with the welfare of society." Robert Golub maintained his innocence as recently as 2009 in an interview with Newsday calling himself "tragedy #2" with Kelly Tinyes being "tragedy #1." In a parole hearing in November 2013 Golub admitted responsibility for Tinyes' death and stated that he had accidentally knocked Tinyes down the stairs, causing her to fall unconscious, then subsequently beating her and finally stabbing her to death. Golub's parole was denied in 2013, 2015, 2017, 2019, 2021 and 2023.

== Civil suit ==
The Tinyes family later brought a civil suit against the Golub family in July 1990, stating that the Golubs had "failed to supervise their son properly" and were responsible in part for the murder of Kelly Tinyes. The Tinyes sought $602 million in damages.

== Media ==
Author Ronald J. Watkins wrote a book about the murder, Against Her Will: The Senseless Murder of Kelly Ann Tinyes, which was published on April 19, 2000.

The murder was featured on a 1990 episode of Geraldo.

== See also ==
- List of solved missing person cases: 1950–1999

== Cited works and further reading ==
- Watkins, Ronald J. (2011). Against Her Will: The Senseless Murder of Kelly Ann Tinyes. Kensington Publishing Corporation. ISBN 978-0-786-02686-9.
