= Matteawan State Hospital for the Criminally Insane =

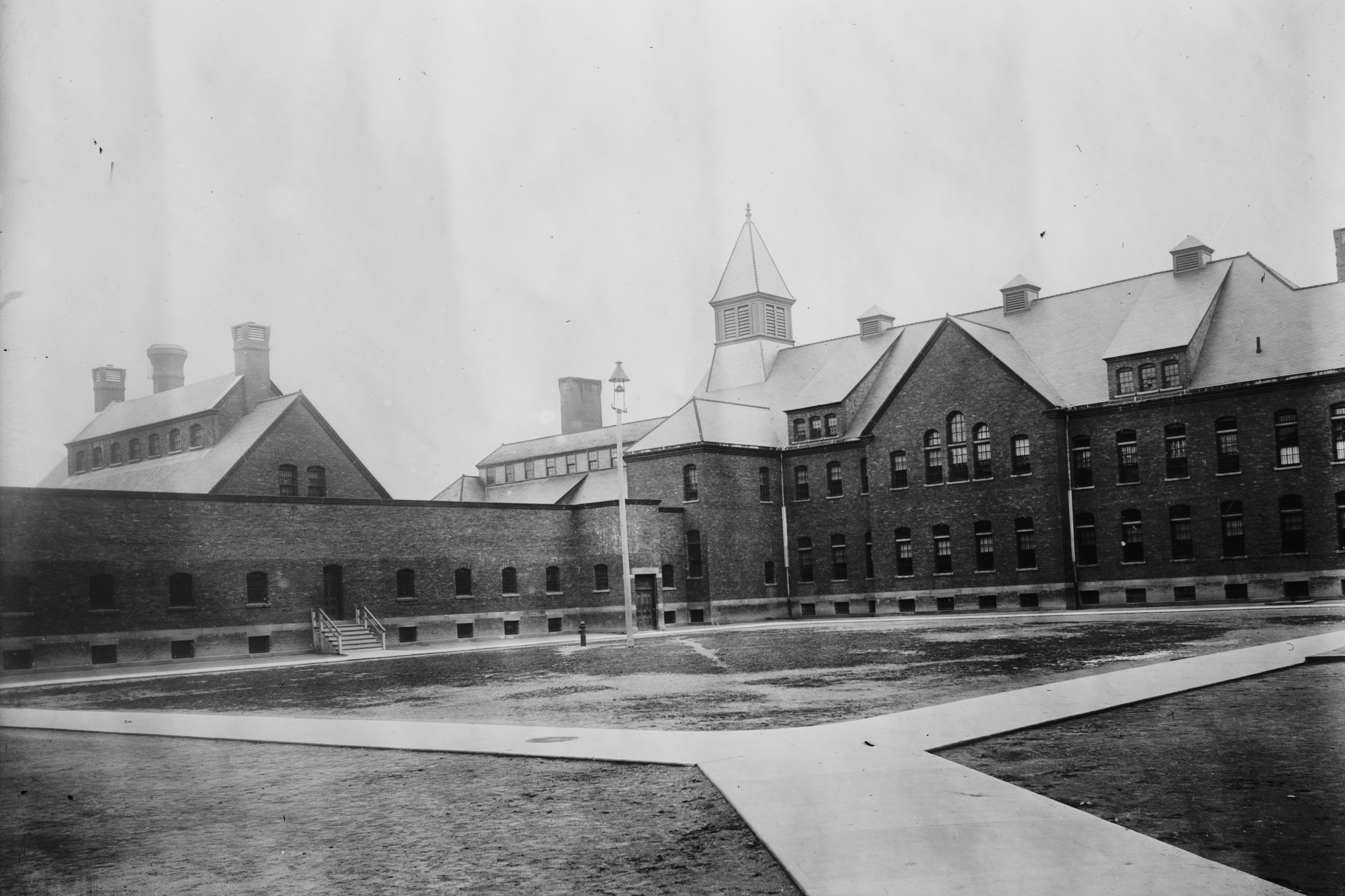
- Exercise yard

Geography
- Location: Matteawan, Dutchess County, New York, United States
- Coordinates: 41.522212°N 73.95057°W

History
- Founded: April 1892
- Closed: 1 January 1977

Links
- Lists: Hospitals in New York State

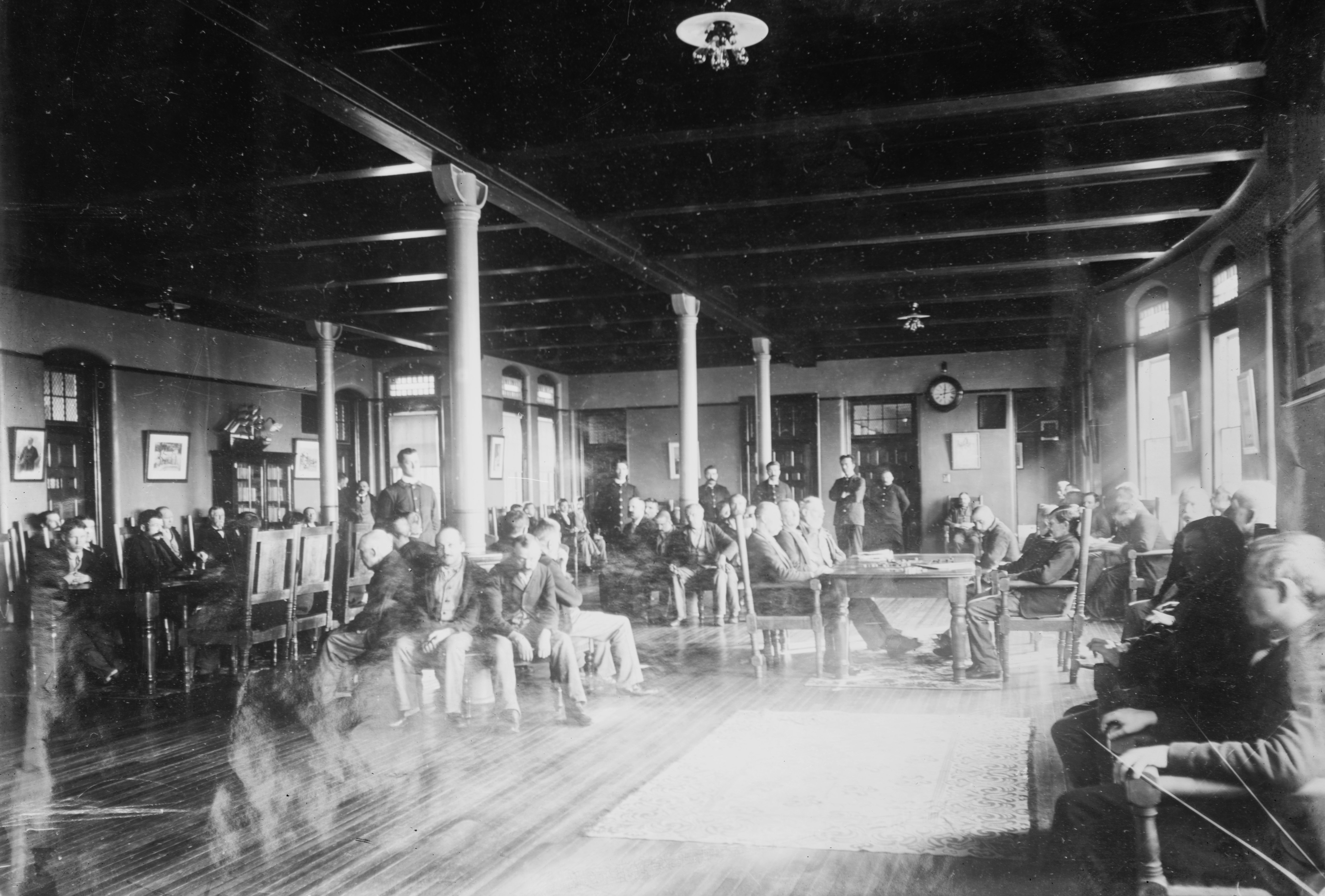
Matteawan State Hospital for the Criminally Insane men's day room

Matteawan State Hospital for the Criminally Insane, established in 1892 as the Matteawan State Hospital by an 1892 law (Chapter 81), functioned as a hospital for insane criminals. It was located in the town of Fishkill just outside the city of Beacon, New York; today its buildings form part of Fishkill Correctional Facility.

The hospital confined and treated individuals who were committed to it by criminal courts and who were declared insane while serving their sentences at state institutions. The Superintendent of State Prisons had control over the hospital.

== Early history ==
In 1886, a New York State legislative commission recommended the purchase of the 246-acre (100 ha) Dates Farm in the village of Matteawan for $25,000. The site was rural, yet accessible by rail and offered good tillable land, pure water and pleasant scenery between the Hudson River and the Fishkill Mountains. Architect Isaac Perry, known for finishing work on the New York State Capitol, was hired to design the main hospital building with "an abundance of light and ventilation" to accommodate 550 patients. In April 1892, the Asylum for Insane Criminals, with 261 patients, was relocated from Auburn to its new site. The following year, it was renamed Matteawan State Hospital.

In 1899, another prison mental hospital was built on the grounds of Clinton. Dannemora would hold male convicts who became insane while serving their sentences, and had the power to retain them if they remained insane at expiration of their sentences. Matteawan would hold unconvicted males as well as females in both categories.

Except for tighter security, Matteawan functioned the same as the state's civil hospitals. Doctors prescribed a program of "moral treatment" developed in the early 1800s. It consisted of kind and gentle treatment in a stress-free, highly routine environment. Patients who were capable were assigned to a work program: cooking, maintenance, and making baskets, rugs, clothing and bedsheets. Like all institutions of its time, Matteawan included extensive acreage for farming to feed its residents. Up to 700 acres (280 ha) were devoted to vegetable and fruit cultivation, a dairy farm, a piggery and pasture land for the animals. Barns and other farm buildings were built down the hill from the asylum. These included a tool shed built in 1900, a greenhouse (1919), a large residence hall for male patients and staff assigned to work the farm (1932) and a horse stable (1933).

=== First U.S. female officer killed ===
In 1906, head attendant Nellie Wicks was killed when she was stabbed by inmate Lizzie Halliday who had been placed there after committing several murders and arsons. Attendant Wicks is the first known female law enforcement officer to be killed in the line of duty in the United States. She had served with the New York State Department of Correctional Services for one year.

== Mid 20th century ==
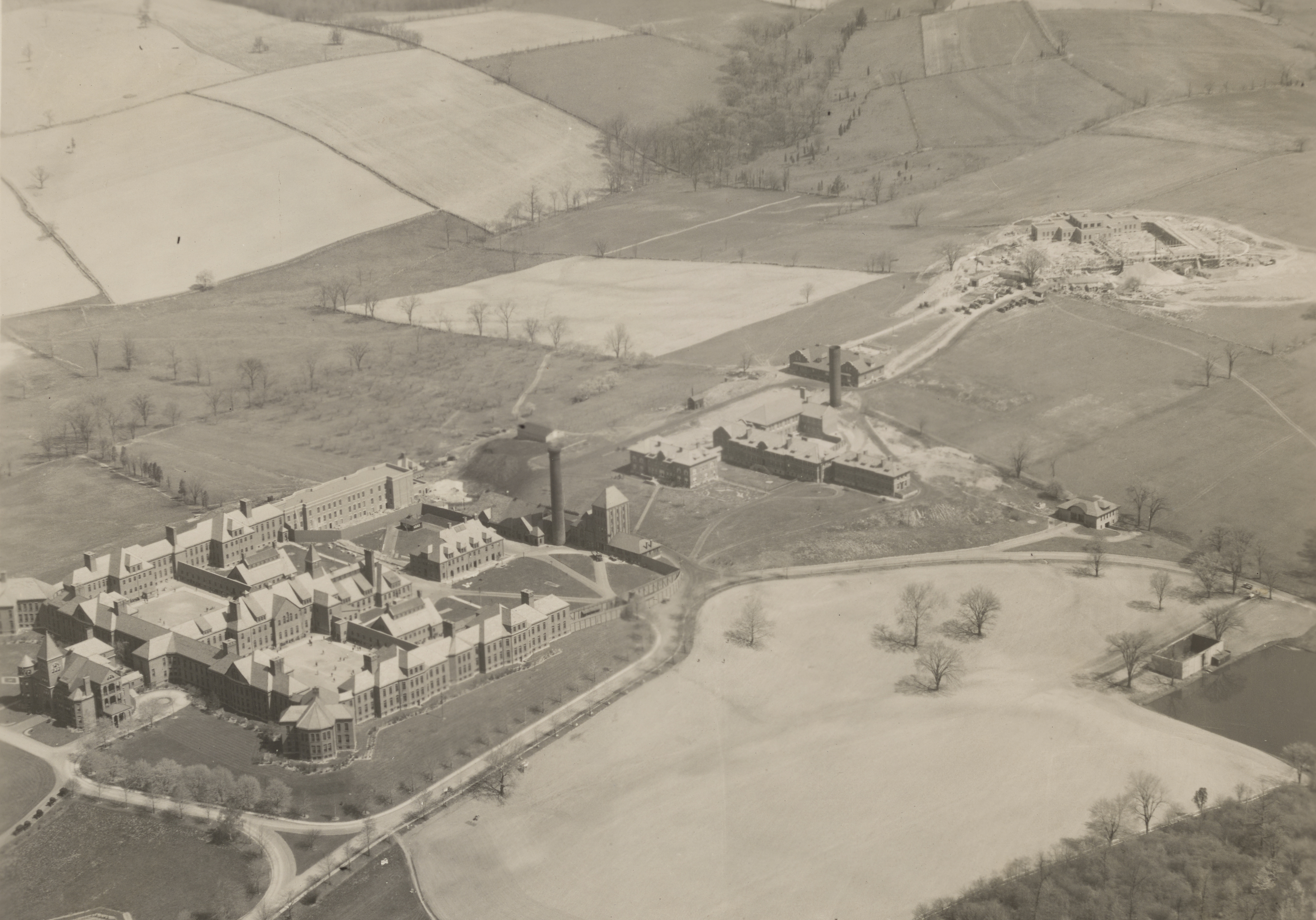
1926 aerial photo of Matteawan State Hospital for the Criminally Insane

=== Change to new treatment methods ===
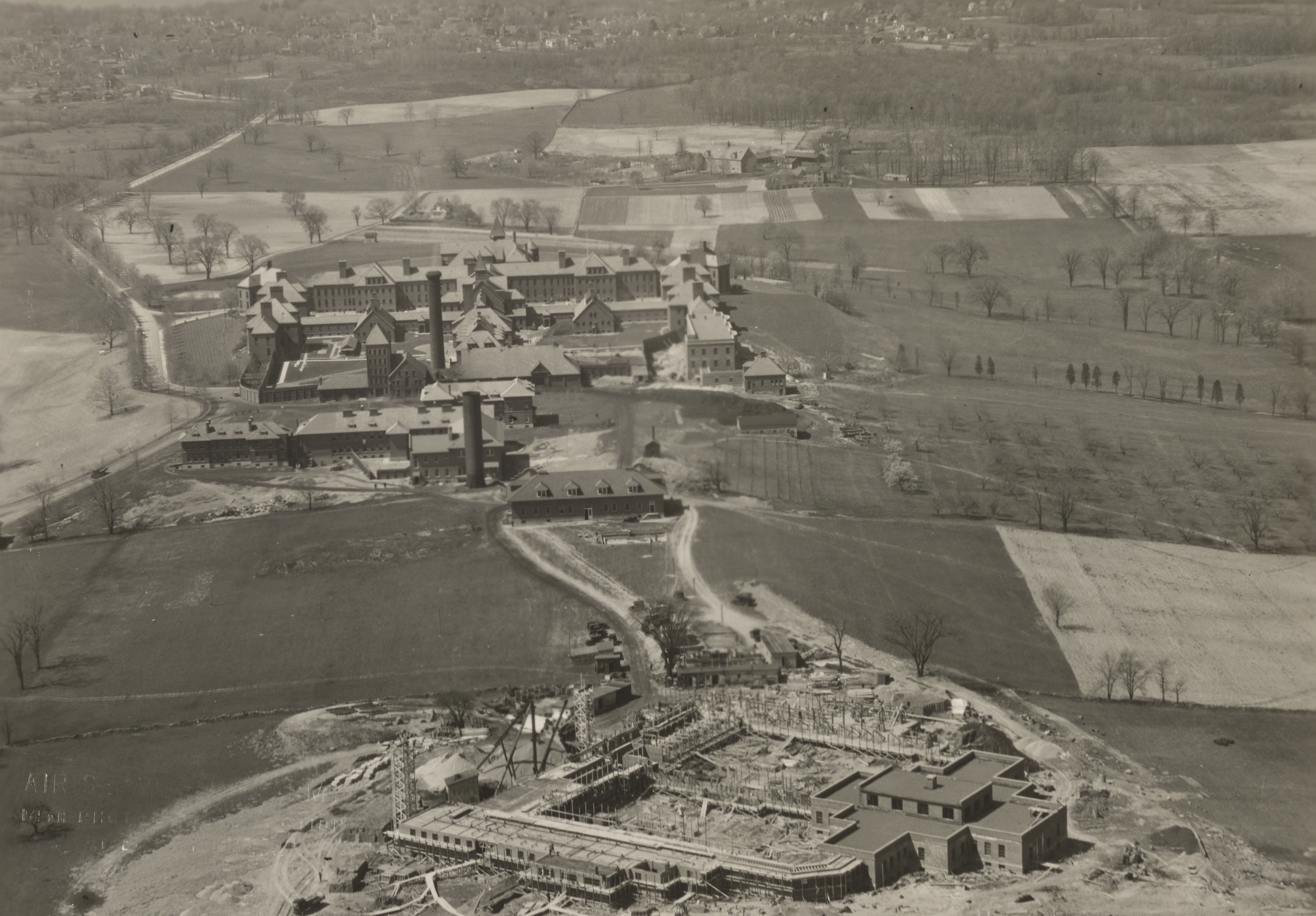
1926 aerial photo of Matteawan State Hospital for the Criminally Insane showing new construction

By the late 1940s, new procedures that included electric and insulin shock treatments were employed regularly at the hospital. Hypnosis and group therapy sessions followed and three lobotomies were performed. By 1949 the facility, originally built for 550, housed almost 1,500 men and 250 women.

=== Closing of farm ===
The Matteawan "colony farm" was closed in the mid-1960s when the director decided that farming was not relevant training for a patient population drawn principally from New York City. ("Relevance" was a consideration that arose during the 1960s for many institutions. In this case, the prison system de-emphasized farming. Since then, DOCS has revitalized its agribusiness program.)

== Recreation ==
Patients were given outdoor exercise in the courtyards twice daily and motion pictures were shown weekly. Radios and phonographs were available on the wards. Patients played softball, tennis, bowling, handball, shuffleboard, volleyball, chess, checkers, cards, gymnastics, ping pong and quoits. At Christmas and other special occasions, there were teas for the women, smokes for the men and "vaudeville entertainments" staged by patients and staff.

== Cemetery ==
The hospital's cemetery, which includes the remains of nearly 1,000 patients that died there, is just west of Beacon High School on Matteawan Road.

== Superintendents ==
- Raymond Francis Charles Kieb – 1914 to 1942

== Notable inmates ==
- Lizzie Halliday (c. 1859–1918), serial killer who murdered five people, including a nurse at Matteawan.
- Harry Thaw (1871–1947), wealthy heir who murdered architect Stanford White.
- Valerie Solanas (1936–1988), radical feminist who attempted to assassinate pop artist Andy Warhol.
- George Metesky (1903–1994), New York City's "Mad Bomber".
- Izola Ware Curry (1916–2015), woman who attempted to assassinate civil rights leader Martin Luther King Jr.
- Clarence 13X (1928–1969), founder of Five-Percent Nation.

== Present day use ==
On January 1, 1977, the New York Department of Mental Hygiene opened the Central New York Psychiatric Center (CNYPC) a special forensic mental health facility which was located on the grounds of the Beacon complex (CNYPC was relocated to a portion of Marcy State Hospital in September of that year). With the creation of CNYPC, Matteawan closed forever.

Some buildings from the former Matteawan State Hospital for the Criminally Insane now serve as part of the medium-security Fishkill Correctional Facility.

== See also ==
- Fishkill Correctional Facility
