= Lizzie Halliday =

Irish-American serial killer

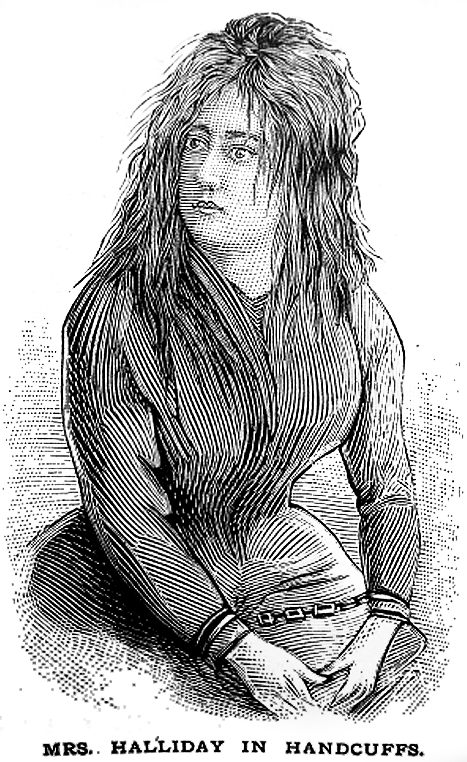
- Newspaper portrait of Lizzie Halliday
- Born: Eliza Margaret McNally c. 1859; County Antrim, Ireland
- Died: June 28, 1918 (aged 58–59); Matteawan State Hospital for the Criminally Insane, Fishkill, New York, United States
- Other names: Maggie Hopkins; Lizzie Brown
- Occupations: Shop owner Housekeeper
- Spouses: Ketspool Brown (married 1879; died 1881); Artemus Brewer (married and died 1881); Hiram Parkinson; George Smith; Charles Playstel; Paul Halliday (murdered 1891)
- Children: 1

Details
- Victims: 4-8+
- Span of crimes: 1891 – 1906 (possibly as far back as 1881)
- Country: United States
- State: New York (state)
- Date apprehended: 1888; 1891

Lizzie Halliday (born Eliza Margaret McNally; c. 1859 – June 28, 1918) was an Irish-American serial killer responsible for the deaths of four people in the Hudson Valley during the 1890s. In 1894, she became the first woman to be sentenced to death by the electric chair. Halliday's sentence was commuted and she spent the rest of her life in a mental institution. She killed a nurse while institutionalized and is speculated to have killed her first two husbands.

== Biography ==
Halliday, originally Eliza Margaret McNally, was born around 1859 in County Antrim, Ireland. Her family moved to the US when she was young (given as aged three or eight).

In 1879, Halliday married a Greenwich, New York, man known by the alias Charles Hopkins; his real name was Ketspool Brown. They are said to have had one son who ended up institutionalized. In 1881, after Hopkins' death, she married pensioner Artemus Brewer, but he also died less than a year later. Her third husband, Hiram Parkinson, left her within their first year of marriage. Halliday went on to marry George Smith, a war veteran who had served with Brewer. After a reported failed attempt to kill Smith by putting arsenic in his tea, Lizzie fled to Bellows Falls, Vermont. She married Vermont resident Charles Playstel, but she vanished two weeks later.

In the winter of 1888, Halliday resurfaced in Philadelphia, at a saloon on 1218 North Front Street that was run by the McQuillans, friends she knew from Ireland. Going by the name "Maggie Hopkins", Halliday set up a shop, but was later convicted of burning it down for the insurance money. She was sentenced to two years at Philadelphia's Eastern State Penitentiary.

In 1889, now going by the name "Lizzie Brown", she became the housekeeper for Paul Halliday, a twice-widowed 70-year-old farmer living in Burlingham, New York, with his sons. The two subsequently married, but their marriage was marred by what Halliday described as Lizzie's sporadic "spells of insanity". Within two years, the Halliday family's house and barn burned to the ground, and she was suspected of setting the fires. At some point, she stole a team of horses and had a neighbor help her drive them to Newburgh, New York, where she sold them. She was acquitted of the crime on the grounds of insanity (accounts vary on this happening in 1890 or 1893).

=== Murders ===
In May 1891, the Halliday house was burned to the ground, killing Halliday's intellectually disabled son John. She was again suspected of setting the fire since she was known to have disliked John. She claimed that he died trying to save her from the flames, but his locked bedroom door was discovered in the rubble, and Halliday was in possession of the key. Soon after, she burned down the Halliday barn and mill as well. She attempted to run off with another man, but was arrested and sent to an asylum. She was transferred to another asylum, but was then declared cured and released, returning home to Halliday.

Paul Halliday disappeared that August. She claimed he had gone to a nearby town to do masonry work. Following the neighbors' suspicions that something was not right about her story, a search warrant was obtained, and on September 4 the bodies of two women were found buried in hay in a barn. Both had been shot. The women were later identified as Margaret and Sarah McQuillan, New York residents who were part of the family Lizzie had stayed with in Philadelphia. Little could be ascertained from Halliday as, when questioned, she behaved in an erratic manner, tearing at her clothes and talking incoherently. She was kept in custody, and some thought she was merely faking insanity. A few days after the McQuillans were found, Paul Halliday's mutilated body was discovered under the floorboards of his house. He had also been shot. Lizzie was charged with the murders and held for trial at the Sullivan County jail in Monticello, New York. During her first few months there, she refused to eat, attacked the sheriff's wife, set fire to her own bed, tried to hang herself, and cut her own throat with broken glass, about which she said, "I thought I would cut myself to see if I would bleed." Her jailers were forced to chain her to the floor during her remaining months there.

=== Press coverage ===
While she was in jail, Lizzie received national attention, with one sensational story after another appearing across the country in tabloid newspapers. The New York World portrayed Lizzie's case as "unprecedented and almost without parallel in the annals of crime". She was also covered by the World's Nellie Bly, who eventually managed to get an interview with Lizzie in which she revealed her previous marriages, facts Bly was able to confirm. Another useful source for reporters was Robert Halliday, Paul Halliday's son. The Sullivan County Sheriff started a new round of speculation when he told the press that Lizzie was probably connected to the Jack the Ripper murders, although no connection was ever made. Robert Halliday similarly told reporters that Lizzie's crimes and the Ripper murders were "very similar," and provided a detailed account of her history of violent spells, prior asylum commitments, and the sequence of arsons on the Halliday farm, including the fire in which Paul's disabled son John perished.

The revelation that she had been married five times before she wed Paul Halliday, that two of her husbands had died less than a year after their weddings and that Lizzie had tried to poison a third led the press to speculate that she was responsible for at least six deaths. "Whether these men died natural deaths or were murdered is not known", The New York Times noted in June 1894. Lizzie also made a claim (confided to Robert Halliday) that she had killed a husband in Belfast, but had managed to conceal the crime.

=== Conviction ===
On June 21, 1894, Halliday was convicted at the Sullivan County Oyer and Terminer Court for the murder of Margaret McQuillan and Sarah Jane McQuillan. She became the first woman ever to be sentenced to death by electrocution, via New York State's new electric chair. Governor Roswell P. Flower commuted her sentence to life in a mental institution after a medical commission declared her insane. The coroner's jury found that Margaret and Sarah McQuillan had been shot with a pistol, and that Paul Halliday had been killed and mutilated in the same manner as Lizzie's first husband. During this period, Halliday remained violent in custody; on June 27, as Sheriff Beecher was conducting her into court, she turned and bit him severely on the hand. By late August the wound had become dangerously infected, swelling to the elbow, and it was feared Beecher might lose his arm.

Halliday was sent to the Matteawan State Hospital for the Criminally Insane, where she spent the remainder of her life. She became a model patient and was trusted with sewing privileges, giving her access to tools, including scissors. She grew close to Nellie Wicks, one of the attendants at Matteawan, but she was deeply upset by Wicks's plans to leave the institution. In 1906, she killed Wicks by stabbing her 200 times with a pair of scissors. On September 27, 1906, when Wicks entered a lavatory adjoining the ward at around 8:30 AM, Halliday followed her in, locked the door, knocked her down, and stabbed her in the throat with Wicks's own scissors; Wicks died two hours later. Halliday had explicitly warned Wicks she would kill her before allowing her to leave, but the threat had been dismissed as one of many idle warnings.

Halliday died of Bright's disease on June 28, 1918, after spending nearly half her life in the asylum.

== See also ==
- List of serial killers in the United States
