= Blood in the Water (novel) =

2007 crime novel by Gillian Galbraith

First edition (publ. Birlinn)

Blood in the Water is a crime novel by Gillian Galbraith. Published in 2007, it is the first of the Alice Rice Mysteries. The protagonist of the series is Alice Rice, a police detective in Edinburgh, Scotland.

Blood in the Water is followed by Where the Shadow Falls (2008), Dying of the Light (2009), and No Sorrow to Die (2010) in the series.
