= Raymond Kieb =

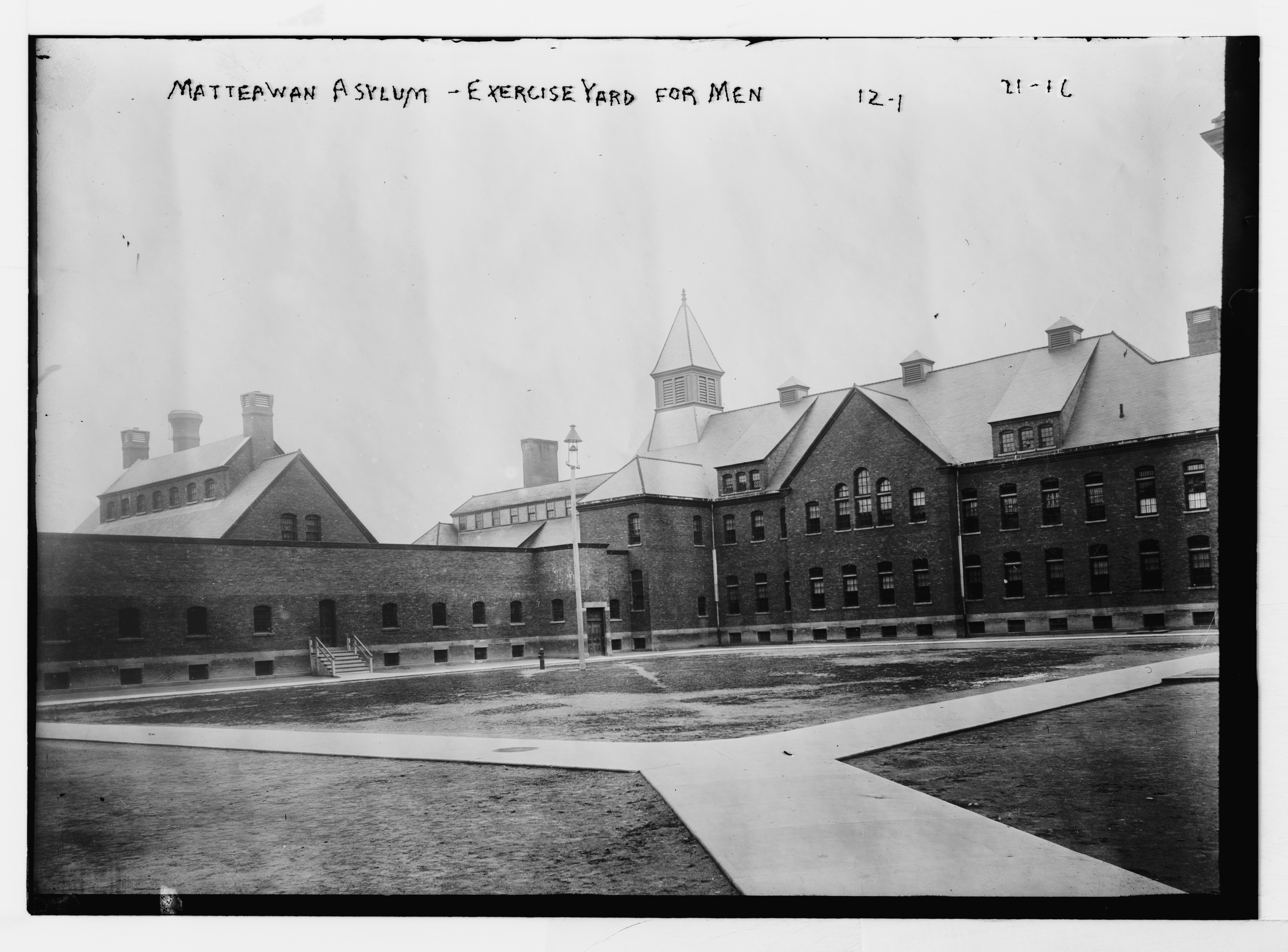
Matteawan State Hospital for the Criminally Insane

Raymond Francis Charles Kieb (August 24, 1881 – March 13, 1956) was the head of the New York State Department of Corrections and Community Supervision. He served as the superintendent of the Matteawan State Hospital for the Criminally Insane from 1914 to 1942.

== Biography ==
He was born on August 24, 1881, in Lowville, New York to Frank Matthew Kieb (1858-1926) and Maria McGrath (1857-1932). On April 26, 1911, in Beacon, New York he married Harriett Marshall Brinckerhoff.

In 1914 he became the superintendent of the Matteawan State Hospital for the Criminally Insane.

He became the head of the New York State Department of Corrections and Community Supervision in 1927.

He retired in 1942. He died at Vassar Brothers Medical Center in Poughkeepsie, New York on March 13, 1956.
