= Gillian Galbraith =

Scottish crime writer

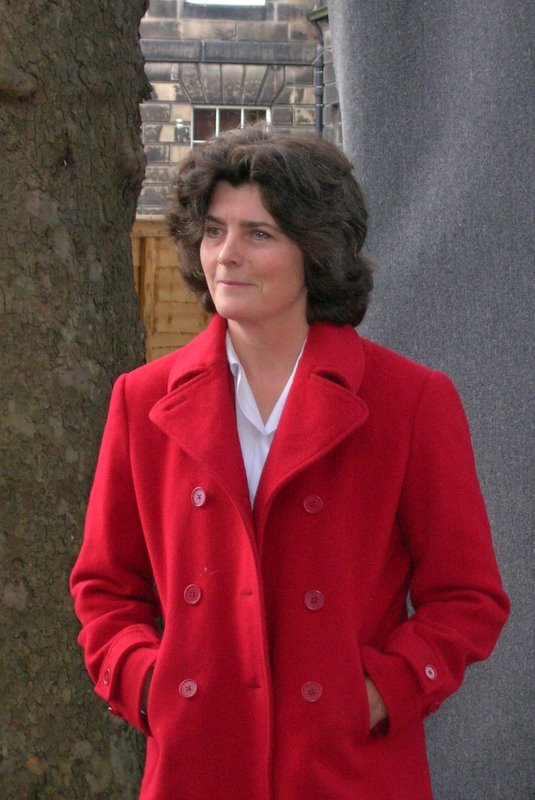
- Gillian Galbraith at the Edinburgh International Book Festival (2007)
- Born: 20th century near Haddington, East Lothian, Scotland, U.K.
- Occupations: advocate; journalist; novelist
- Website: gilliangalbraith.net

Gillian Galbraith is a Scottish advocate-turned-author, a Scottish crime-fiction writer, whose protagonist, DS Alice Rice, is based in Edinburgh.

== Biography ==
Gillian was born and brought up near Haddington, East Lothian.

Galbraith practiced until 1999 as an advocate specialising in medical-negligence cases. She was the legal correspondent for The Scottish Farmer and has written on legal matters for The Times.

She lives in Kinross-shire with her husband, Robert, and daughter, Daisy Galbraith (born 26 August 1999).

== Works by Galbraith ==
=== DS Alice Rice series ===
- Blood in the Water (2007)
- Where the Shadow Falls (2008)
- Dying of the Light (2009)
- No Sorrow to Die (2010)
- The Road to Hell (2012)
- Troubled Waters (2014)

=== Father Vincent Ross series ===
- The Good Priest (2014)

=== Standalone ===
- The End of the Line (2019)

== See also ==
- List of crime fiction writers
- List of journalists
- List of mystery writers
- List of Scottish novelists
- List of University of Edinburgh people
