= Paul Geidel =

Former longest-serving inmate in the United States (1894–1987)

Paul Geidel Jr.
- Born: April 21, 1894; Hartford, Connecticut, U.S.
- Died: May 1, 1987 (aged 93); Beacon, New York, U.S.
- Known for: The third longest-serving prison sentence in United States history, that ended upon his release (parole). (time served – 68 years 296 days)
- Conviction: Second-degree murder
- Penalty: 20 years to life

Details
- Date: July 26, 1911
- Country: United States
- State: New York
- Locations: Sing Sing Prison; Clinton Correctional Facility; Fishkill Correctional Facility
- Date apprehended: July 28, 1911; served for 68 years, 284 days until he was paroled on May 7, 1980.

Paul Geidel Jr. (April 21, 1894 – May 1, 1987) was the third longest-serving prison inmate in the United States whose sentence ended with his parole, a fact that earned him a place in Guinness World Records. His record was overtaken by Francis Clifford Smith who served 70 years, 31 days and Walter H. Bourque Jr. who served 69 years, 31 days.

After being convicted of second-degree murder in 1911 at age 17, Geidel served 68 years and 296 days in various New York state prisons. He was released on May 7, 1980, at the age of 86.

== Early life and murder ==
Geidel was born in Hartford, Connecticut, to an alcoholic saloon keeper, Paul Geidel Sr., and his wife Annie Prumbaum, and he had a sister Agnes Geidel (later Reynolds; 1895–1953). His parents were born in Germany.

Geidel's father died in 1900 when Geidel was five. The boy spent much of his childhood in an orphanage. He dropped out of school at the age of 14 and worked a series of jobs in Hartford and New York City hotels.

On July 26, 1911, Geidel—17 years old at the time—robbed and murdered elderly 73-year-old William H. Jackson, a wealthy broker. Jackson was a guest at the Iroquois Hotel on West 44th Street in New York City where Geidel was working as a bellhop. Geidel entered Jackson's room and suffocated him to death with a rag filled with chloroform. Geidel made off with only a few dollars.

Geidel was arrested two days later. He was subsequently convicted of second-degree murder and sentenced to 20 years to life in prison.

== Imprisonment ==
Geidel began his sentence at the Sing Sing prison. His sentence was shortened due to good behavior and he was nearing a possible parole hearing, but doctors then found Geidel to be legally insane in 1926. He was then moved to the Dannemora State Hospital for the Criminally Insane, where he was confined until 1972. He was then moved to the Fishkill Correctional Facility. Here, Geidel lived in a unit designed for elderly inmates that more resembled a dormitory rather than a prison.

As Geidel's tenure in prison went by, he developed a rapport with prison officials, who sometimes took him out to a baseball game, or other outings.

Geidel was granted parole in August 1974, but the then-80-year-old inmate did not want to leave. Having lived in prison for 63 years—his entire adult life—and having no family, he believed he would not make it on the outside, having become institutionalized. He chose to remain in prison for almost six more years.

== Release ==
On May 7, 1980, Geidel left Fishkill, having served at the time the longest prison sentence in United States history. "No publicity please", Geidel said with a smile to reporters as he was leaving the facility. He is believed to have lived out the remainder of his days in a Beacon, New York nursing home, before dying on May 1, 1987, at age 93.

== See also ==
- List of longest prison sentences served
