= George Metesky =

American electrician, mechanic, and bomber (1903–1994)

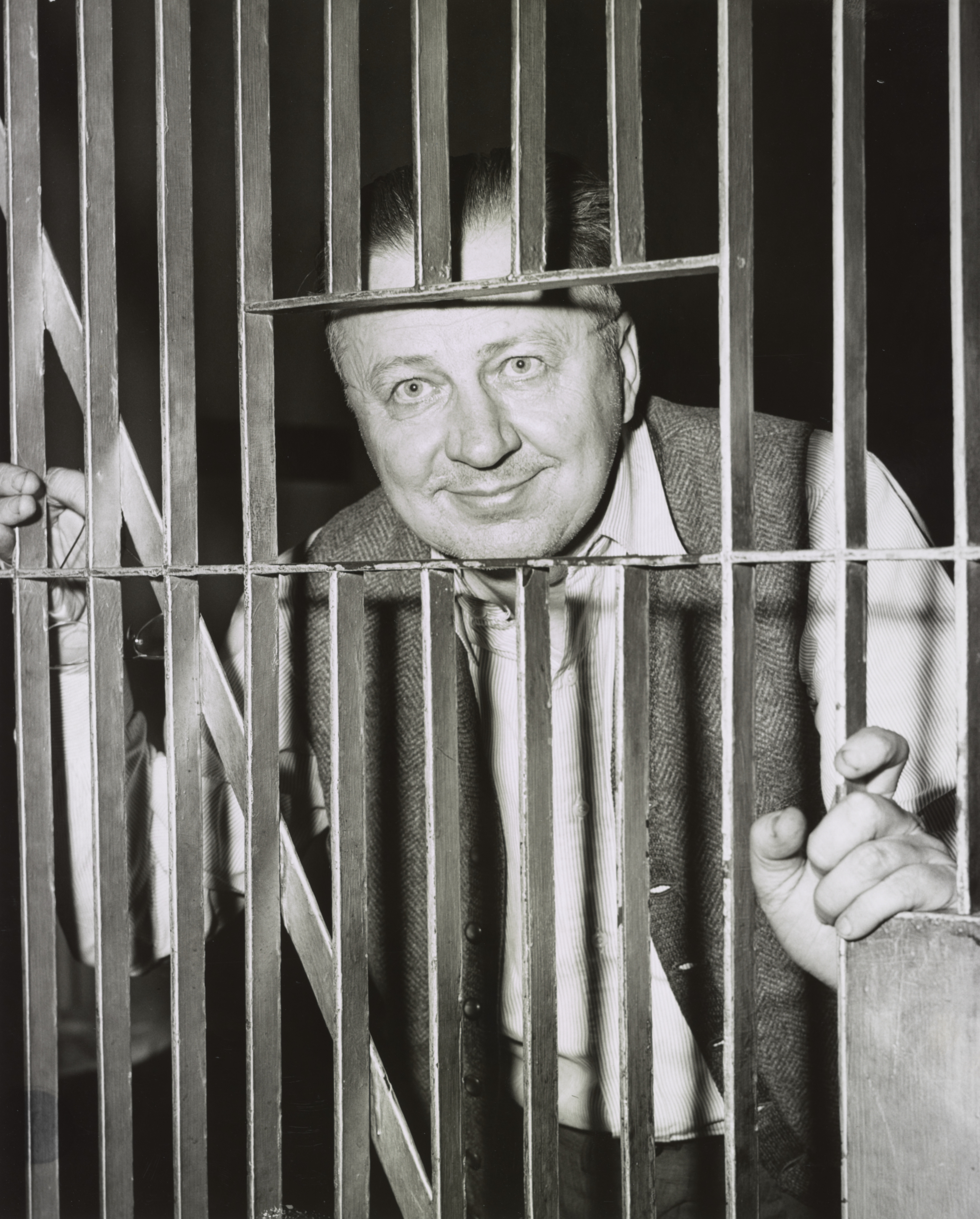
- Metesky in the Waterbury, Connecticut, jail after his arrest in 1957.
- Born: George Peter Milauskas; November 2, 1903; Waterbury, Connecticut
- Died: May 23, 1994 (aged 90); Waterbury, Connecticut
- Other names: Mad Bomber, "F.P."
- Occupations: Electrician, mechanic
- Status: Transferred to Creedmoor Psychiatric Center in 1973, released the same year
- Motive: Anger and resentment about a workplace injury
- Convictions: Not tried: declared legally insane and incompetent to stand trial
- Criminal charges: 47 charges: attempted murder, damaging a building by explosion, maliciously endangering life, and carrying concealed weapons in violation of New York State's Sullivan Law.
- Penalty: Committed to Matteawan State Hospital for the Criminally Insane

George Peter Metesky (November 2, 1903 – May 23, 1994), better known as the Mad Bomber, was an American electrician and mechanic who terrorized New York City for 16 years in the 1940s and 1950s with explosives that he planted in theaters, terminals, libraries and offices. Bombs were left in phone booths, storage lockers and restrooms in public buildings, including Grand Central Terminal, Pennsylvania Station, Radio City Music Hall, the New York Public Library, the Port Authority Bus Terminal and the RCA Building, and in the New York City Subway. Metesky also bombed movie theaters, where he cut into seat upholstery and slipped his explosive devices inside.

Angry and resentful about events surrounding a workplace injury suffered years earlier, Metesky planted at least 33 bombs, of which 22 exploded, injuring 15 people. The hunt for the bomber enlisted an early use of offender profiling. He was apprehended in 1957 on the basis of clues given in letters he wrote to a newspaper. He was found legally insane and committed to a state mental hospital.

== Early life and industrial injury ==
George was born on November 2, 1903, in Waterbury, Connecticut, to two Lithuanian immigrants, George and Anna Milauskas. He was the youngest of three siblings. Following World War I, Metesky joined the U.S. Marines, serving as a specialist electrician at the United States Consulate in Shanghai. Returning home, he went to work as a mechanic for a subsidiary of the Consolidated Edison utility company and lived in Waterbury, Connecticut, with his two unmarried sisters. In 1931, Metesky was working as a generator wiper at the company's Hell Gate generating plant when a boiler backfire produced a blast of hot gases. The blast knocked Metesky down and the fumes filled his lungs, choking him.

The accident left him disabled and, after collecting 26 weeks' sick pay, he lost his job. According to claims disputed by Consolidated Edison, the accident led to pneumonia that in turn developed into tuberculosis. A claim for workers' compensation was denied because he waited too long to file it. Three appeals of the denial were also rejected, the last in 1936. He developed a hatred for the company's attorneys and for the three co-workers whose testimony in his compensation case he believed was perjured in favor of the company.

== Bombs ==
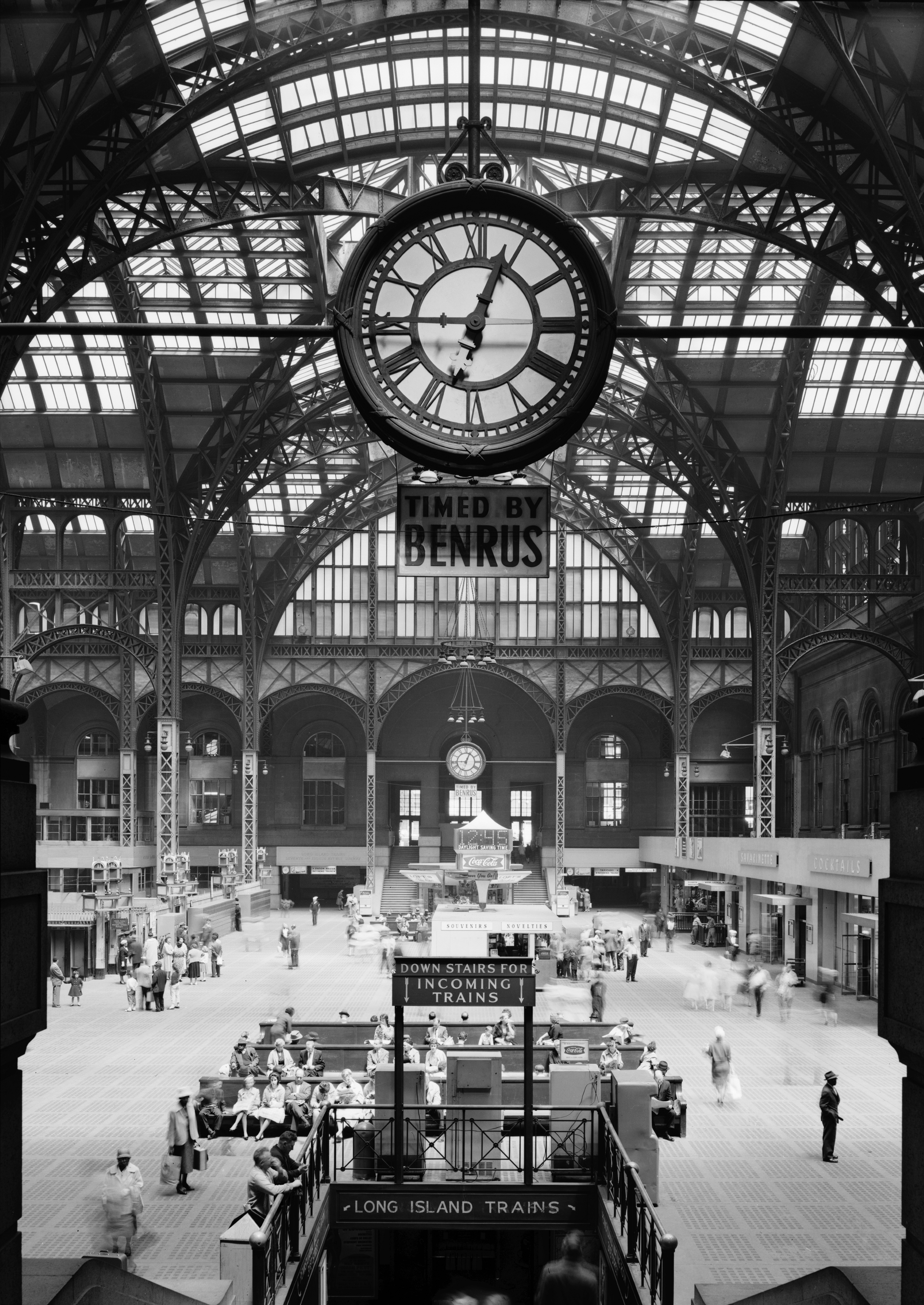
Pennsylvania Station

Metesky's bombs were gunpowder-filled pipe bombs, ranging in size from 4 to 10 inches (10 to 25 cm) long and from 0.5 to 2 inches (1 to 5 cm) in diameter. Most used timers constructed from flashlight batteries and cheap pocket watches. Investigators at bomb sites learned to look for wool socks, which Metesky used to transport the bombs and sometimes to hang them from a rail or projection.

Between 1940 and 1956, Metesky planted at least 33 bombs, of which 22 exploded, injuring 15 people.

=== First bombs (1940–1941) ===
Metesky planted his first bomb on November 16, 1940, leaving it on a window sill at the Consolidated Edison power plant at 170 West 64th Street in Manhattan. The bomb was crude, a short length of brass pipe filled with gunpowder, with an ignition mechanism composed of sugar and flashlight batteries and enclosed in a wooden toolbox. It was found before it could detonate. The bomb was wrapped in a note written in distinctive block letters and signed "F.P.", stating

Con Edison crooks – this is for you.

Some investigators wondered whether the bomb was an intentional dud, as if it had exploded, the note would have been obliterated.

In September 1941, a bomb with a similar ignition mechanism was found lying in the street about five blocks away from the Consolidated Edison headquarters building at 4 Irving Place. This bomb had no note and was also a dud. Police theorized that the bomber might have spotted a police officer and dropped the bomb without setting its fuse.

=== Hiatus ===
Shortly after the United States entered World War II in December 1941, the police received a letter in block capital letters:

I will make no more bomb units for the duration of the war – my patriotic feelings have made me decide this – later I will bring the Con Edison to justice – They will pay for their dastardly deeds ... F.P.

True to his word, Metesky planted no bombs between 1941 and 1951, choosing instead to send letters and postcards to police stations, newspapers, private citizens and Con Edison. Investigators studying the penciled, block-lettered messages noted that the letters G and Y had an odd shape, possibly indicating a European education.

=== 1951–1956 ===
Metesky's first two bombs drew little attention, but the string of seemingly random bombings that began in 1951 frayed the city's nerves and taxed the resources of the New York City Police Department. Metesky often placed warning calls to the buildings where he had planted bombs, but he would typically not specify the bombs' exact locations. He wrote to newspapers warning that he planned to plant more. Some bombs came with notes, but the notes never revealed a motive or a reason for choosing any particular location. The long hiatus since the last bomb and the improved construction techniques of the first new bomb led investigators to believe that the bomber had served in the military.

For his new wave of bombings, Metesky mainly chose public buildings as targets, bombing several of them multiple times. Bombs were left in phone booths, storage lockers and restrooms in public buildings including Grand Central Terminal (five times), Pennsylvania Station (five times), Radio City Music Hall (thrice), the New York Public Library (twice), the Port Authority Bus Terminal (twice) and the RCA Building, as well as in the New York City Subway. Metesky also bombed movie theaters, where he cut into seat upholstery and slipped his explosive devices inside.

==== 1951 ====
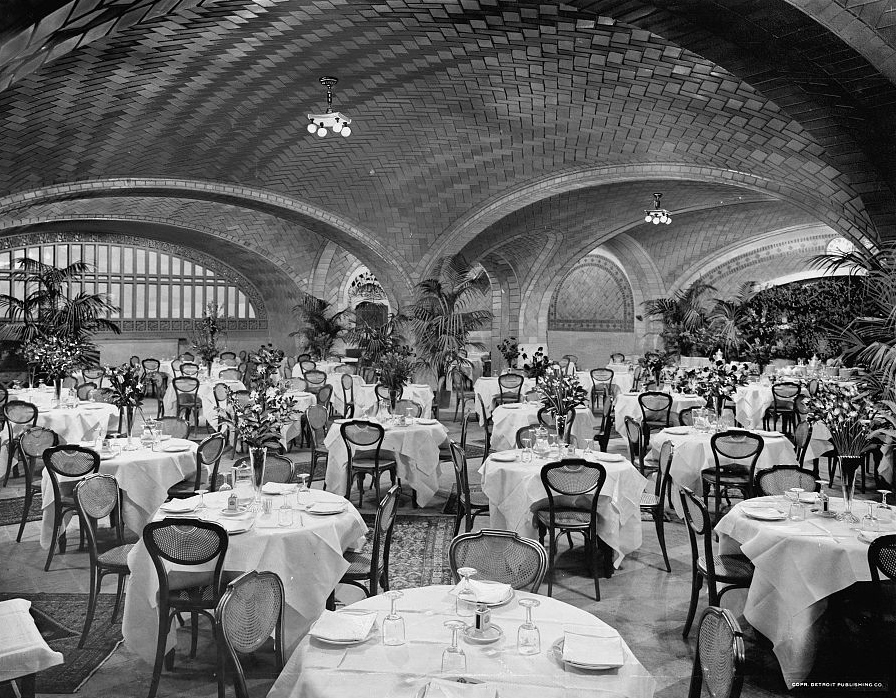
Grand Central Oyster Bar Restaurant

On March 29, Metesky's first bomb of the new wave, and also his first to explode, startled commuters at Grand Central Terminal but injured none. It had been dropped into a sand urn near the Grand Central Oyster Bar & Restaurant on the terminal's lower level. In April, Metesky's next bomb exploded without injury in a telephone booth in the New York Public Library. In August, a phone-booth bomb exploded without injury at Grand Central Station.

Police dismissed the event as the work of "boys or pranksters". The New York Times reported the event in the following day's issue, although only with a three-paragraph brief at the bottom of page 24.

Metesky next planted a bomb that exploded without injury in a phone booth at the Consolidated Edison headquarters building at 4 Irving Place. He also mailed one bomb, which did not explode, to Consolidated Edison from White Plains, New York.

On October 22, the New York Herald Tribune received a letter in penciled block letters stating:

Bombs will continue until the Consolidated Edison company is brought to justice for their dastardly acts against me. I have exhausted all other means. I intend with bombs to cause others to cry out for justice for me.

The letter directed police to the Paramount Theater in Times Square, where a bomb was discovered and disabled, and to a telephone booth at Pennsylvania Station where nothing was found.

On November 28, a coin-operated locker at the IRT 14th Street subway station was bombed, without injury. Near the end of the year, the Herald Tribune received another letter, warning:

Have you noticed the bombs in your city – if you are worried, I am sorry – and also if anyone is injured. But it cannot be helped – for justice will be served. I am not well, and for this I will make the Con Edison sorry – yes, they will regret their dastardly deeds – I will bring them before the bar of justice – public opinion will condemn them – for beware, I will place more units under theater seats in the near future. F.P.

==== 1952 ====
On March 19, a bomb exploded in a phone booth at the Port Authority Bus Terminal without causing injury. In June and again in December, bombs exploded in seats at the Lexington Avenue Loew's theater. The December bombing injured one person and was the first Metesky bomb to cause injury. Police had asked the newspapers not to print any of the bomber's letters and to downplay earlier bombings, but by now the public was becoming aware that a bomber was on the loose.

==== 1953 ====
Bombs exploded in seats at Radio City Music Hall and at the Capitol Theater, with no injuries. A bomb again exploded near the Oyster Bar in Grand Central Terminal, this time in a coin-operated rental locker, again with no injuries. Police described this bomb as the homemade product of a "publicity-seeking jerk". An unexploded bomb was found in a rental locker at Pennsylvania Station.

==== 1954 ====
A bomb wedged behind a sink in a Grand Central Terminal men's room exploded in March, slightly injuring three men.

A bomb planted in a phone booth at the Port Authority Bus Terminal exploded with no injuries. Another bomb was discovered in a phone booth that was removed from Pennsylvania Station for repair.

As a capacity Radio City Music Hall audience of 6,200 watched Bing Crosby's White Christmas on November 7, a bomb stuffed into the bottom cushion of a seat in the 15th row exploded, injuring four patrons. The explosion was muffled by the heavy upholstery, and only those nearby heard it. While the film continued, the injured were escorted to the facility's first-aid room and about 50 people in the immediate area were moved to the back of the theater. After the film and the following stage show concluded 90 minutes later, the police searched for evidence in the 150-seat area nearest to the explosion.

==== 1955 ====
A bomb exploded without injuries on the platform at the IRT Sutter Avenue subway station in Brooklyn. A bomb hung beneath a phone booth shelf exploded on the main floor of Macy's department store, with no injuries. Two bombs exploded without injuries at Pennsylvania Station, one in a rental locker and one in a phone booth. A bomb was found at Radio City Music Hall after a warning phone call.

At the Roxy Theater, a bomb dropped from a slashed seat onto an upholsterer's workbench without exploding. A seat bomb exploded at the Paramount Theater, where one patron was struck on the shoe by bomb fragments but avoided injury. Investigators discovered a small penknife pushed inside the seat, one of several found at theater-seat bombings. They theorized that the bomber left his knives behind in case he was stopped and questioned. In December, a bomb exploded without injuries in a Grand Central men's-room stall.

==== 1956 ====
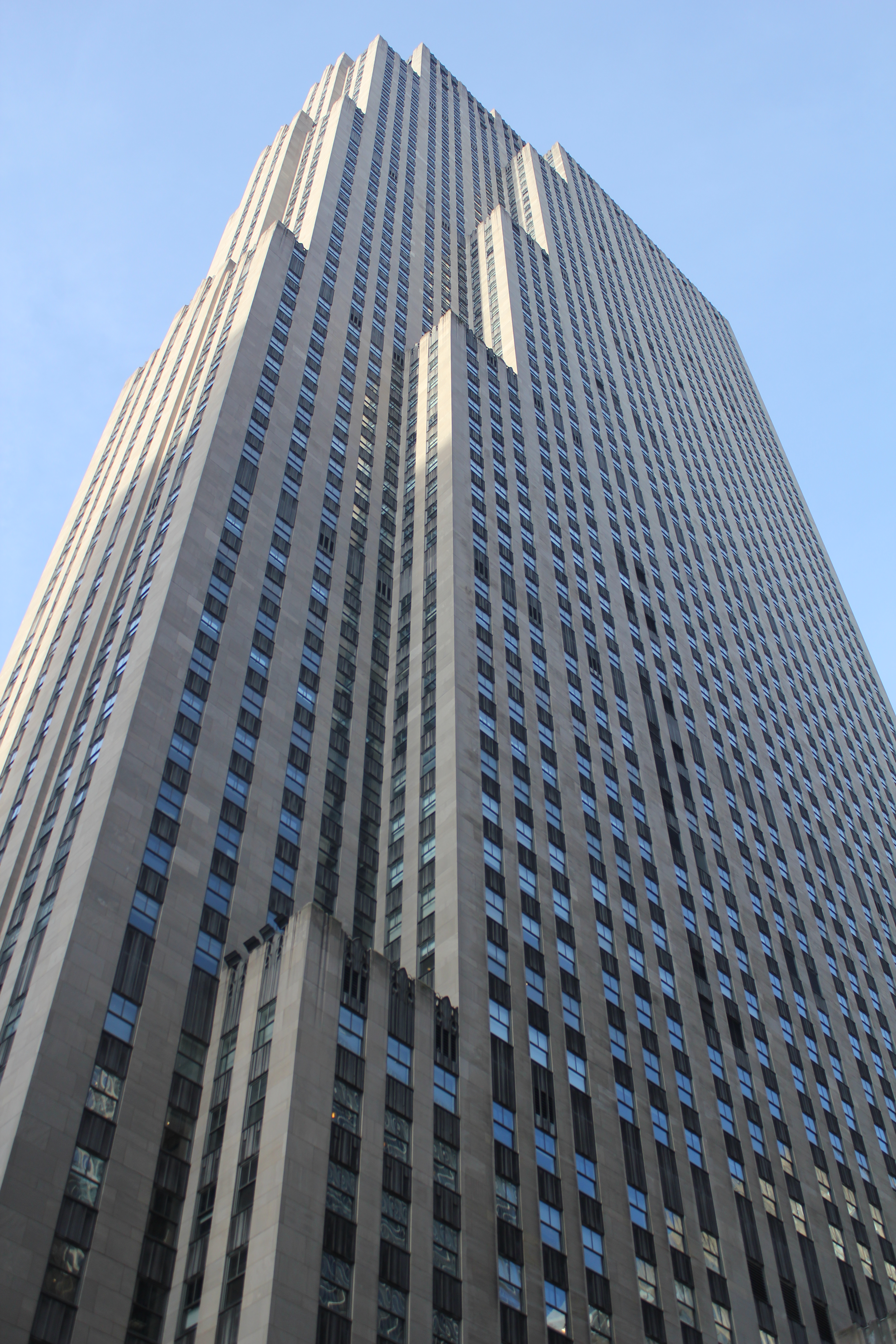
RCA Building

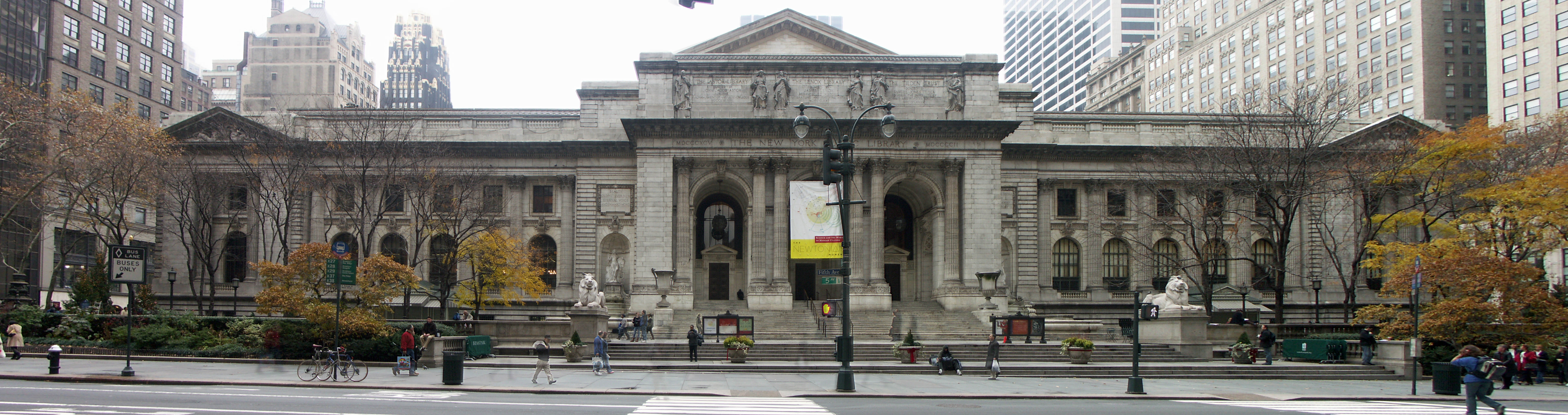
New York Public Library

A 74-year-old men's-room attendant at Pennsylvania Station was seriously injured when a bomb in a toilet bowl exploded. A young man had reported an obstruction and the attendant tried to clear it using a plunger. Among the porcelain fragments, investigators found a watch frame and a wool sock.

A guard at the RCA Building in Rockefeller Center discovered a piece of pipe about five inches long in a telephone booth. A second guard thought it might be useful in a plumbing project and took it home on the bus to New Jersey, where it exploded on his kitchen table early the next morning. No one was injured.

A December 2 bombing at the Paramount Theater in Brooklyn left six of the theater's 1,500 occupants injured, one seriously, and drew tremendous news coverage and editorial attention. The next day, police commissioner Stephen P. Kennedy ordered what he called the "greatest manhunt in the history of the Police Department".

On December 24, a New York Public Library clerk using a phone booth dropped a coin. Looking up after he retrieved it, he saw a maroon-colored sock held to the underside of the shelf by a magnet. The sock contained an iron pipe with a threaded cap on each end. After consulting with other employees, he threw the device out a window into Bryant Park, bringing the bomb squad and more than 60 NYPD police officers and detectives to the scene.

In a letter to the New York Journal American the next month, Metesky said that the library bomb, as well as one discovered later the same week inside a seat at the Times Square Paramount, had been planted months before.

=== 1957 discovery ===
Eight months after Metesky's January 1957 arrest, a bomb that had not been previously found was discovered at the Lexington Avenue Loew's Theater by an upholsterer repairing a recently vandalized seat. It was the last of the three bombs that Metesky said that he had planted there. The first two had exploded, one in June 1952 and one in December 1952, with the December explosion resulting in one injury.

As of the Loew's discovery, only two of the dozens of bombs that Metesky claimed to have planted remained undiscovered, one at a Con Edison site on the East River and the other at the Embassy Theater at 7th Avenue and 47th Street.

With the finding of the third Loew's bomb, police closed the case, stating that their searches of the two remaining locations had been so thorough that they were satisfied that the bombs were no longer there, if indeed they ever had been.

== Search ==
Throughout the investigation, the prevailing theory was that the bomber was a former Con Edison employee with a grudge against the company. Con Edison employment records were reviewed, but there were hundreds of other leads, tips, and crank letters to be followed up on. Detectives ranged far and wide, checking lawsuit records, mental hospital admissions, and vocational schools where bomb parts might be made. Citizens turned in neighbors who behaved oddly, and co-workers who seemed to know too much about bombs. A new group, the Bomb Investigation Unit, was formed to work on nothing but bomber leads.

In April 1956, the department issued a multi-state alert for a person described as a skilled mechanic, with access to a drill press or lathe (for its ability to thread pipe), who posted mail from White Plains, was over 40, and had a "deep-seated hatred of the Consolidated Edison Company". A warning circular picturing a homemade pipe bomb similar to the bomber's was distributed. Police distributed samples of the bomber's distinctive printing and asked anyone who might recognize it to notify them. A review of drivers' license applications in White Plains, the city favored by the bomber for posting his mail, found similarities in 500 of them to the bomber's printing; the names were forwarded to the NYPD for investigation.

The December 2, 1956 bombing of the Brooklyn Paramount drew tremendous news coverage and editorial attention. The following day, police commissioner Stephen P. Kennedy met with commanders of every NYPD division and ordered what he called the "greatest manhunt in the history of the Police Department". Calling the bomber's activities "an outrage that cannot be tolerated", he promised "an immediate good promotion" to whoever arrested the bomber, and directed commanders to alert every member of the force to the absolute necessity of a capture.

On December 27, 1956, the New York City Board of Estimate and the Patrolmen's Benevolent Association posted $26,000 in rewards for the bomber's apprehension.

=== Distractions ===
Throughout the search, simulated bombs and false bomb reports wasted police resources and frightened an already nervous public.

Around 1951 Frederick Eberhardt, 56 years old and, like Metesky, a former Con Edison employee with a grudge, sent a simulated pipe bomb filled with sugar to the company's personnel director at 4 Irving Place. Eberhardt was charged with sending threatening material through the mails. At his arraignment in November, an assistant district attorney told the judge, "This defendant is a particular source of annoyance to the New York City police. We are firmly convinced that he is not of sound mind. He has been sending simulated bombs around the city the past few months. Hundreds of police have been called out at all hours of the day and night to investigate because of his actions."

Eberhardt was sent to Bellevue Hospital for psychiatric examination. Several months later the case was dismissed after Eberhardt's lawyer argued successfully that the package contained no "written threats", as the law required.

In October 1951, the main waiting room at Grand Central Terminal was emptied and 3,000 lockers were searched after a telephoned bomb warning. The search involved more than 35 NYPD personnel, and took three hours because 1,500 of the lockers were in use and only one master key was available. As each locker was opened, the head of the bomb squad palpated its contents, keeping a portable fluoroscope at the ready.

On December 29, 1956, at the height of false bomb reports from theaters, department stores, schools and offices, a note left in a phone booth at Grand Central Terminal reported that a bomb had been placed at the Empire State Building, requiring a search of all 102 floors of the landmark. A 63-year-old railroad worker picked up at Grand Central as a suspect died of a heart attack while being questioned at the East 35th Street station house. Later investigation eliminated him as a suspect.

== Profile ==
Fingerprint experts, handwriting experts, the bomb investigation unit and other NYPD groups made little progress. With traditional police methods seemingly useless against Metesky's erratic bombing campaign, police captain John Cronin approached his friend James A. Brussel, a criminologist, psychiatrist and assistant commissioner of the New York State Commission for Mental Hygiene. Captain Cronin asked Brussel to meet with inspector Howard E. Finney, head of the NYPD's crime laboratory. Brussel examined the crime-scene photos and letters to develop an offender profile of the bomber. Brussel concluded that the bomber was suffering from paranoia, a condition that he described as "a chronic disorder of insidious development, characterized by persistent, unalterable, systematized, logically constructed delusions". Based on the evidence and his own experience dealing with psychotic criminals, Brussel offered a number of theories beyond the obvious grudge against Consolidated Edison:

Male, as historically most bombers were male. Well proportioned and of average build, based on studies of hospitalized mental patients. Forty to fifty years old, as paranoia develops slowly. Precise, neat and tidy, based on his letters and the workmanship of his bombs. An exemplary employee, on time and well-behaved. A Slav, because bombs were favored in Middle Europe. A Catholic, because most Slavs were Catholic. Courteous but not friendly.

Has a good education but probably not college. Foreign-born or living in a community of the foreign-born – the formal tone and old-fashioned phrasing of the letters sounded to Brussel as if they had been written or thought out in a foreign language and then translated into English. Based on the rounded letter "w's" of the handwriting, believed to represent breasts, and the slashing and stuffing of theater seats, Brussel thought something about sex was troubling the bomber, possible an oedipus complex – loving his mother and hating his father and other authority figures.

A loner, no friends, little interest in women, possibly a virgin. Unmarried, perhaps living with an older female relative. Probably lives in Connecticut, as Connecticut has high concentrations of Slavs, and many of the bomber's letters were posted in Westchester County, midway between Connecticut and New York City.

Although the police policy had been to keep the bomber investigation low-key, Brussel convinced them to heavily publicize the profile, predicting that any incorrect assumptions would prod the bomber to respond. Under the headline "16-Year Search for a Madman", the New York Times version of the profile summarized the major predictions:

Single man, between 40 and 50 years old, introvert. Unsocial but not anti-social. Skilled mechanic. Cunning. Neat with tools. Egotistical of mechanical skill. Contemptuous of other people. Resentful of criticism of his work but probably conceals resentment. Moral. Honest. Not interested in women. High school graduate. Expert in civil or military ordnance. Religious. Might flare up violently at work when criticized. Possible motive: discharge or reprimand. Feels superior to critics. Resentment keeps growing. Present or former Consolidated Edison worker. Probably case of progressive paranoia.

Newspapers published the profile on December 25, 1956 alongside the story of the so-called "Christmas Eve bomb" discovered in the Public Library. By the end of the month, bomb hoaxes and false confessions had risen to epidemic proportions. At the peak of the hysteria on December 28, police received more than 50 false bomb alarms.

== New York Journal-American letters ==
The day after the profile was published, the New York Journal-American published an open letter, prepared in cooperation with the police, urging the bomber to surrender. The newspaper promised a fair trial and offered to publish his grievances. Metesky responded the next day, signing his letter "F.P.". He wrote that he would not surrender and revealed a wish to "bring the Con. Edison to justice". He listed all of the locations where he had placed bombs that year and seemed concerned that not all of them had been discovered. Later in the letter, he wrote:

My days on earth are numbered – most of my adult life has been spent in bed – my one consolation is – that I can strike back – even from my grave – for the dastardly acts against me.

After some editing by the police, the newspaper published Metesky's letter on January 10, along with another open letter asking him for more information about his grievances.

Metesky's second letter provided some details about the materials used in the bombs (he favored pistol powder, as "shotgun powder has very little power"), promised a bombing "truce" until at least March 1, and wrote "I was injured on job at Consolidated Edison plant – as a result I am adjudged – totally and permanently disabled", indicating that he was forced to pay his own medical bills and that Consolidated Edison had blocked his workers' compensation case. He also wrote:

When a motorist injures a dog – he must report it – not so with an injured workman – he rates less than a dog – I tried to get my story to the press – I tried hundreds of others – I typed tens of thousands of words (about 800,000) – nobody cared – ... – I determined to make these dastardly acts known – I have had plenty of time to think – I decided on bombs.

After police editing, the newspaper published his letter on January 15 and asked the bomber for "further details and dates" about his compensation case so that a new hearing could be held.

Metesky's third letter was received by the newspaper on Saturday, January 19. He complained of having laid unnoticed for hours on cold concrete after his injury without first aid, later leading to pneumonia and tuberculosis. The letter added details about his lost compensation case and the "perjury" of his coworkers, and provided the date of his injury, September 5, 1931. The letter suggested that he would have considered surrender to force the reopening of his compensation case if he did not have a family that would be "branded" by his identification. He thanked the Journal-American for publicizing his case and wrote that "the bombings will never be resumed". The letter was published Tuesday, the day after Metesky was arrested.

== Identification ==
Con Edison clerk Alice Kelly scoured the company's workers' compensation files for employees with serious health problems. On Friday, January 18, 1957, while searching the final batch of case files, she found a file marked in red with the words "injustice" and "permanent disability", words that had been printed in the New York Journal-American. The file indicated that Metesky, an employee from 1929 to 1931, had been injured in a plant accident on September 5, 1931. Several letters from Metesky in the file employed wording similar to that of the letters published in the Journal-American, including the phrase "dastardly deeds". The police were notified and added the information to their list of leads. They asked Waterbury police to check on Metesky at his house at 17 Fourth Street.

After Metesky's arrest, early police statements credited the discovery of his file to an NYPD detective. Later, a report developed in a reward investigation conceded that Kelly had found the file. Although the NYPD officially credited Kelly, she declined to claim the $26,000 in rewards, asserting that she had merely been doing her job. Consolidated Edison's board of directors also declined to file for the reward, prompting a group of shareholders to file as representatives of Kelly and the company.

Police investigators accused Con Edison of having impeded the investigation for almost two years by repeatedly informing them that employee records prior to 1940 had been destroyed. The police claimed that even after the employee records were located, Con Edison rejected police demands and formal requests, declaring that the papers were legal documents that could not be disclosed without the consent of its legal department. The company termed its lack of responsiveness to police requests a "misunderstanding".

== Arrest ==
Accompanied by Waterbury police, four NYPD detectives arrived at Metesky's home with a search warrant shortly before midnight on Monday, January 21, 1957. They asked him for a handwriting sample and to write a letter G. He then said, "I know why you fellows are here. You think I'm the Mad Bomber." The detectives asked what "F.P." meant and he responded, "F.P. stands for Fair Play."

Metesky led them to the garage workshop, where they found his lathe. Hidden in the pantry of the house, the police found pipes and connectors suitable for bomb-making as well as three cheap pocket watches, flashlight batteries, brass terminal knobs and unmatched wool socks of the type used to transport the bombs.

== Interrogation ==
Metesky told the arresting officers that he had been "gassed" in the Con Edison accident, had contracted tuberculosis as a result and started planting bombs because he "got a bum deal". Reviewing a police list of 32 bomb locations, but never saying the word "bomb", he remembered the exact date when each bomb had been placed and their sizes. He also added to the police list the size, date and location of 15 early bombs that the police had not discovered, all left at Con Edison locations. When his Con Edison bombs were not mentioned in the newspapers, he started planting bombs in public places to gain publicity for what he termed the "injustices" done him. He also confirmed that he had planted no bombs during World War II "for patriotic reasons".

In their search, police found parts for a bomb that would have been larger than any of the others. Metesky explained that it was intended for the New York Coliseum.

== Indictment ==
Metesky admitted to placing 32 bombs. After a grand jury heard testimony from 35 witnesses including police experts and those injured, he was indicted on 47 charges: attempted murder, damaging a building by explosion, maliciously endangering life and violation of New York State's Sullivan Law by carrying concealed weapons. Seven counts of attempted murder were charged, based on the seven people injured in the preceding five years, the period of the statute of limitations. Metesky underwent psychiatric examination at Bellevue Hospital.

== Commitment to Matteawan ==
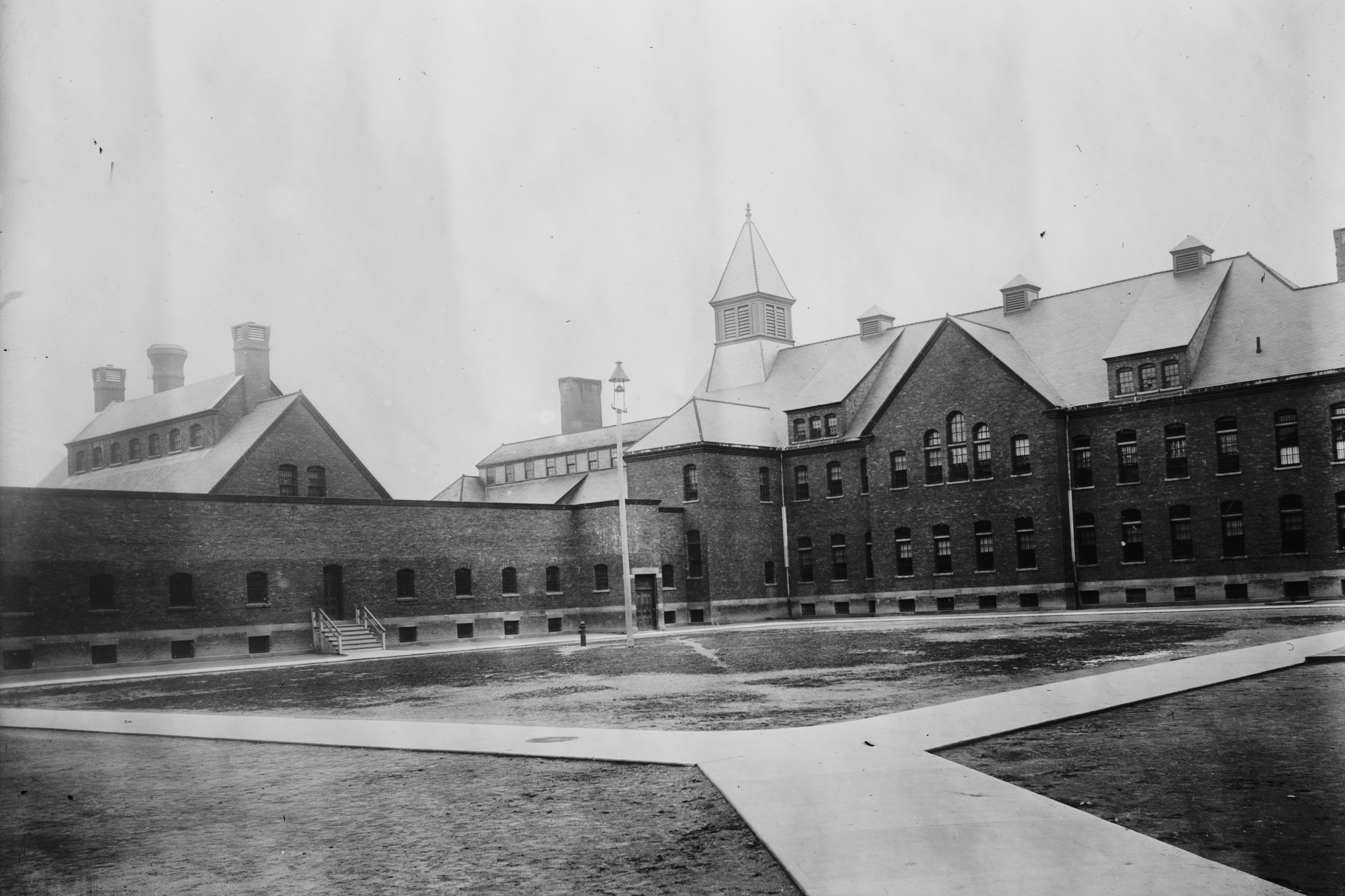
Matteawan Hospital for the Criminally Insane

After hearing testimony from psychiatric experts, judge Samuel Liebowitz declared Metesky a paranoid schizophrenic, "hopeless and incurable both mentally and physically", and declared him legally insane and incompetent to stand trial. On April 18, 1957, Liebowitz committed Metesky to the Matteawan Hospital for the Criminally Insane in Beacon, New York.

Expected to live only a few weeks because of his advanced tuberculosis, Metesky's health improved after a year and a half of treatment, and a newspaper article written 14 years later described the 68-year-old Metesky as "vigorous and healthy looking".

While Metesky was at Matteawan, the Journal-American hired leading workers' compensation attorney Bartholomew James O'Rourke to appeal his disallowed claim for the 1931 injury on the grounds that Metesky was mentally incompetent at the time and did not know his rights, but the appeal was denied.

Metesky was unresponsive to psychiatric therapy but was a model inmate and caused no trouble. He was visited regularly by his sisters and occasionally by Brussel, to whom he would emphasize that he had deliberately built his bombs not to kill anyone.

== Release ==
In 1973, the United States Supreme Court ruled that a mentally ill defendant cannot be committed to a hospital operated by the New York State Department of Correctional Services unless a jury finds him dangerous. Since Metesky had been committed to Matteawan without a jury trial, he was transferred to the Creedmoor Psychiatric Center, a state hospital outside the correctional system.

Doctors determined that he was harmless, and because he had already served two-thirds of the 25-year maximum sentence he would have received at trial, Metesky was released on December 13, 1973. The single condition was that he make regular visits to a Connecticut Department of Mental Hygiene clinic near his home.

Interviewed by a reporter upon his release, he said that he had forsworn violence, but reaffirmed his anger and resentment toward Consolidated Edison. He also stated that, before he began planting his bombs,

I wrote 900 letters to the Mayor, to the Police Commissioner, to the newspapers, and I never even got a penny postcard back. Then I went to the newspapers to try to buy advertising space, but all of them turned me down. I was compelled to bring my story to the public.

Metesky returned to his home in Waterbury, where he died 20 years later in 1994 at the age of 90.
