= Beverle Graves Myers =

American writer

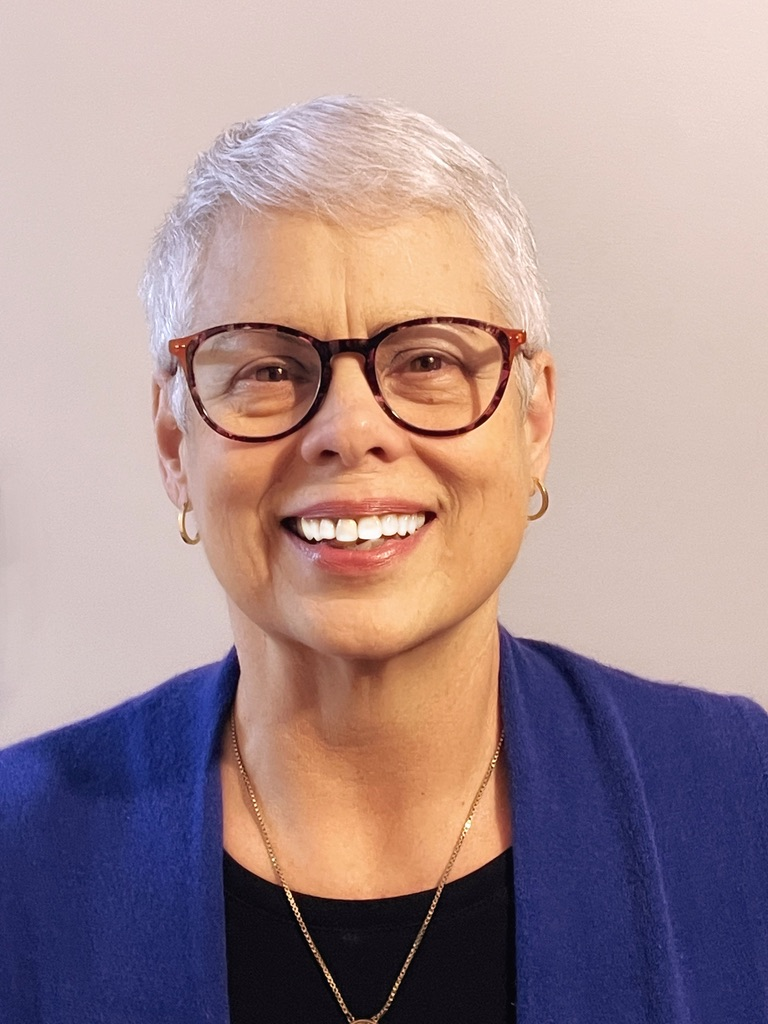
- Born: March 31, 1951 (age 74) Louisville, Kentucky, U.S.
- Occupation: Author
- Education: University of Louisville (BA); University of Louisville School of Medicine (MD)
- Genre: Mystery fiction
- Children: 2

Beverle Graves Myers (born March 31, 1951) is an American author of mystery novels and short stories. Her major work is the Tito Amato mystery series set in 18th-century Venice, published by Poisoned Pen Press. She is also the co-author, with Joanne Dobson, of a stand-alone crime novel set in New York City on the eve of World War II. Myers' novels are traditional mysteries which feature a large cast of characters, a deep sense of time and place, and meticulously researched period details. Myers' short stories are set in a variety of times and places; several stories feature her series characters.

== Background ==
Myers was born and raised in Louisville, Kentucky. Her father was an attorney, her mother a homemaker. Myers attended the University of Louisville, earning a BA in History and an MD from the School of Medicine. She also completed a residency program in psychiatry and practiced at a public mental health clinic in eastern Kentucky for approximately ten years before taking up writing full-time. When not traveling in search of new inspiration, Myers makes her home in Louisville, Kentucky. She has two adult children and four grandchildren.

== Career ==
Myers combined her love of history, opera, Italy, and mystery to write the Tito Amato mystery series. She often states that she fell in love with the mystery genre while reading Agatha Christie as a young girl. She credits Anne Rice's Cry to Heaven and Steven Saylor's Gordianus the Finder series with providing inspiration for her historical series that follows the career of Venetian castrato soprano and amateur sleuth Tito Amato. Her first novel, Interrupted Aria, was published by Poisoned Pen Press in 2004. The complete series encompasses six books. Her first published short story, "A Baroque Phantom," was also set in Venice and has been followed by numerous others. Four stories which have been published in Alfred Hitchcock's Mystery Magazine form a series featuring Nicco Zianni, an 18th-century "Private Eye."

Myers' work has been nominated for the Macavity Award, Kentucky Literary Award, and Derringer Award. One of her short stories, "Haven City," was named a Notable Story of 2006 by the Million Writers Award.

She is a member of Mystery Writers of America and the Historical Fiction Authors Cooperative. She has served on the boards of the Midwest Chapter of MWA, HFAC, her local Sisters in Crime chapter, and was Program Chair for the Kentucky Woman's Book Festival 2006.

== Novels ==
Year	Title	ISBN	Publisher
2004	Interrupted Aria	ISBN 1-59058-224-1	Poisoned Pen Press
2005	Painted Veil	ISBN 1-59058-294-2	Poisoned Pen Press
2006	Cruel Music	ISBN 1-59058-425-2	Poisoned Pen Press
2008	The Iron Tongue of Midnight	ISBN 1-59058-672-7	Poisoned Pen Press
2009	Her Deadly Mischief	ISBN 1-59058-233-0	Poisoned Pen Press
2012	Face of the Enemy co-authored with Joanne Dobson	ISBN 9781464200311	Poisoned Pen Press
2014	Whispers of Vivaldi	ISBN 9781464202087	Poisoned Pen Press

== Short stories ==
Year	Title	Publication
2001 (Summer Issue)	A Baroque Phantom	Fables
2002 (November)	Head Case	Orchard Press Mysteries
2002/2003 (Winter Issue)	A Minor Break-In	Flashquake
2003 (February)	Foul Ball	Shred of Evidence
2003 (Fall)	Revenge of the Snake Woman	Futures Mysterious Anthology Magazine
2003 (November 18)	Force of Habit	Woman's World
2004 (January 20)	A Foolproof Scheme	Woman's World
2004 (January)	Sweet Smell of Success	Who Died in Here?, Penury Press
2004 (May)	Dead Heat with a Pale Horse & Walking Around Money	Derby Rotten Scoundrels, Silver Dagger
2004 (June)	Mirror, Mirror	Dime, Quiet Storm Publishing
2004 (September)	The Franklin Fiasco	Alfred Hitchcock Mystery Magazine
2004 (November)	Windows to the Soul	Shred of Evidence
2005 (December)	The Mozart Muddle	Alfred Hitchcock Mystery Magazine
2006 (April)	The Casanova Caper	Alfred Hitchcock Mystery Magazine
2006 (May)	The True Story of the Whirlaway Café	Low Down and Derby, Silver Dagger
2006 (Fall Issue)	Haven City	Spinetingler Magazine
2007 (May)	Brimstone P.I.	Alfred Hitchcock Mystery Magazine
2007 (December)	The Bookworm's Demise	Alfred Hitchcock Mystery Magazine
2009 (April)	A Cutting Wind	Alfred Hitchcock Mystery Magazine
2009 (October)	A Good Cuppa Joe co-authored with Joanne Dobson	Alfred Hitchcock Mystery Magazine

== Articles ==
Year	Title	Publication
2005-06 (Winter)	All Roads Lead to Venice	Mystery Readers Journal
2006	Thoughts on The Name of the Rose (Umberto Eco)	Mystery Muses, CrumCreek Press
2008 (Spring)	Forgotten Heroes of the Stage	Mystery Readers Journal
2012	I Haven't Got a Clue!	Writing Murder, The Writers' Center of Indiana
