= Will Levinrew =

American writer

William Levine (1881–July 24, 1951) was an American dentist and writer of mystery books under the pseudonym Will Levinrew.

== Biography ==
William Levine was born in Russia in 1881 and emigrated to the United States as a child. He grew up in New Jersey. By the early 1900s he had established his dental practice in Passaic; he later also had an office in Newark.

In addition to his dental practice, Dr. Levine was a part time journalist in Newark. He was very politically active in both New Jersey, where he ran for local office and was a strike sympathizer, and Pinellas County, Florida, where he moved in his later years. In the 1930s, he gained attention for challenging a New Jersey law that forbade dentists from advertising prices for services.

He died in Newark, New Jersey on July 24, 1951.

== Works ==
=== Professor Brierly Series ===
- The Poison Plague (1929) -first appeared in 1922 as a serial in Argosy All-Story Weekly
- Murder on the Palisades (1930) -also published as The Wheelchair Corpse (1945)
- Murder from the Grave (1930)
- For Sale – Murder (1932)
- Death Points a Finger (1933)

=== Other works ===
- “Framed” in The Phantom Detective, February, 1933
