= Dolores Gordon-Smith =

British novelist

Dolores Gordon-Smith (born 1958) is a British novelist. She is best known for writing The Jack Haldean murder mysteries, the first of which, A Fête Worse than Death was published in 2007. Set in England in the 1920s, there are currently nine books in the series. She has been called one of Britain's "Top crime authors".

She has also written a stand-alone historical novel, Frankie's Letter, set during World War I.

== Biography ==
Dolores Gordon-Smith was born in Glossop, Derbyshire. She graduated with a degree in English from Kingston Polytechnic in 1981.

=== Personal life ===
She is married and lives in Cheshire with her husband and five daughters, Helen, Elspeth, Jessica, Lucy and Jennifer.

=== Author ===
Jack Haldean is the fictional main character of Dolores Gordon-Smith's books. He is a former World War I pilot who now writes mysteries. In 1915 at the age of 16, he was accepted into the new Royal Flying Corps. Jack became a good friend to a police officer after trying to get information about a crime. He was later confided in about a huge murder, which started his hobby of investigating crimes.

The Jack Haldean mysteries play out against the tranquil Sussex countryside backdrop, each murder belying the seemingly mundane environment. The plot of this book begins in a fortune teller's tent, where Jack has unravelled a supposed suicide and confronts his best friend Arthur over his involvement in the murder of a businessman.

== Jack Haldean series ==
A Fête Worse than Death (2007)
Mad About the Boy? (2008)
As if by Magic (2009)
A Hundred Thousand Dragons (2010)
Off the Record (2011)
Trouble Brewing (2012)
Blood From a Stone (2013)
After the Exhibition (2014)
The Chessman (2015)
Forgotten Murder (2018)
The Chapel in the Woods (2021)
