= Joanne Dobson =

American novelist

- Born: March 27, 1942 (age 84); New York City, U.S.
- Education: The King's College; University of New York at Albany; University of Massachusetts Amherst (PhD)
- Occupation: Novelist
- Writing career
- Genre: Mystery fiction

Joanne Dobson (born March 27, 1942, in New York City) is a writer of mystery novels and features in Great Women Mystery Writers (2007).

== Biography ==
Dobson graduated in 1963 from The King's College, New York gaining a degree in English. She later earned a master's from the University of New York at Albany in 1977 and a PhD from the University of Massachusetts Amherst in 1985. She taught at Amherst College and Tufts University before becoming a tenure-track professor at Fordham University. She founded a scholarly society devoted to Emily Dickinson and was a founding editor of Legacy: A Journal of American Women Writers. She has taught Fulbright Fellowship International summer programs at Amherst College, and currently teaches courses at the Hudson Valley Writers’ Center in Sleepy Hollow, which in 2014 honored her as a writer, teacher, and scholar. She lives in Brewster, New York.

== Writing ==
Until recently Dobson's work has featured Karen Pelletier, an English professor at Enfield College in Enfield, Massachusetts, a fictionalized Amherst College. Pelletier is from working class Lowell and became an unmarried mother in high school and estranged from her family. She gets involved in cases involving manuscripts, writers and academia and often in liaison with the local police, specifically detective Charlie Piotrowski with whom she develops a personal relationship through the series. In 2016, Dobson published the short story In The Attic, which continued Pelletier's story.

In 2012, Dobson announced a new series written in collaboration with Beverle Graves Myers set in World War II New York and featuring a seasoned homicide detective and two young women, a nurse and a reporter. The book, Face of The Enemy, was on the bestseller list of the Maine Sunday Telegram.

In 2014, Dobson published The Kashmiri Shawl, her first historical fiction novel.

== Bibliography ==
=== Karen Pelletier series ===
- Quieter Than Sleep: A Modern Mystery of Emily Dickinson (1997)
- The Northbury Papers (1998)
- The Raven and the Nightingale: A Modern Mystery of Edgar Allan Poe (1999)
- Cold and Pure and Very Dead (2000)
- The Maltese Manuscript (2003)
- Death Without Tenure (2009)
- In the Attic (short story) (2016)

=== New York in Wartime Mysteries ===
- Face of the Enemy (2012), with Beverle Graves Myers

=== Other novels ===
- The Kashmiri Shawl (2014)

=== Non-fiction ===
- "The Scholar Sleuth: Or, Death in a Literary Context", conference paper, in AZ Murder Goes ... Professional, ed. Barbara Peters (2002)
