= Anne Wingate =

American novelist (1943–2021)

- Wingate at CONduit 17 in Salt Lake City, Utah.
- Born: Martha Anne Guice; September 4, 1943; Savannah, Georgia, U.S.
- Died: September 2, 2021 (aged 77); Salt Lake City, Utah, U.S.
- Occupations: Writer; Crime scene investigator (ret.)
- Writing career
- Pen name: Lee Martin; Martha G. Webb
- Genres: mystery, fantasy, romance, mainstream
- Website: wingate-firms.com

Anne Wingate (September 4, 1943 – September 2, 2021) was a mystery, fantasy, and romance writer who lived in Salt Lake City, Utah. She owned two publishing houses (including one with her husband), and published works under her own name as well as the pseudonyms Lee Martin and Martha G. Webb. She died on September 2, 2021, in Salt Lake City.

== Biography ==
Wingate was born on September 4, 1943, as Martha Anne Guice in Savannah, Georgia, She grew up as a member of the Disciples of Christ Church, and is an adult convert to the Church of Jesus Christ of Latter-day Saints. Prior to becoming a writer, she worked as a crime scene investigator.

In January 2006, Wingate was brought into the media spotlight because her adopted daughter, Alicia Wingate, was killed along with her boyfriend in a police shootout in Kansas. Her daughter was being sought in connection with the murder of man in Utah. Wingate stated that—on the basis of published information about the crime at the time—she is certain that Alicia would have been quickly exonerated if the case had made it to court.

She died on September 2, 2021, in Salt Lake City.

=== Career ===
Most of her mysteries are set somewhere within Texas. Her LDS beliefs sometime show in her works. Wingate was partner with her husband, Thomas Russell Wingate, in Wingate & Wingate, Writers. She also owned Live Oak House, an e-publishing company. Through Live Oak House, she published other writers, her own fantasies and romances, and works by some of her children. She and her husband were part-time Project Coordinators of the Project Gutenberg Literary Archive Foundation, the not-for-profit corporation that receives and processes donations to Project Gutenberg.

In addition to works published under her own name, Wingate wrote under the pseudonyms Lee Martin and Martha G. Webb.

== Bibliography ==
=== Novels ===
- Darling Corey's Dead (as Martha G. Webb, 1984), Walker & Company, ISBN 0-8027-5582-8
- A White Male Running (as Martha G. Webb, 1985), Walker & Company, ISBN 0-8027-5611-5
- Even Cops' Daughters (as Martha G. Webb, 1986), Walker & Company, ISBN 0-8027-5637-9

==== Deb Ralston Mystery series ====
Follows an LDS detective in Fort Worth, Texas.

- Too Sane a Murder (as Lee Martin, 1984), St. Martin's Press, ISBN 0-312-80901-8
- A Conspiracy of Strangers (as Lee Martin, 1986), St. Martin's Press, ISBN 0-312-16433-5
- Murder at the Blue Owl (as Lee Martin, 1988), St. Martin's Press, ISBN 0-312-01795-2
- Hal's Own Murder Case (as Lee Martin, 1988), St. Martin's Press, ISBN 0-312-02925-X
- Death Warmed Over (as Lee Martin, 1988), St. Martin's Press, ISBN 0-312-02221-2
- Deficit Ending (as Lee Martin, 1990), St. Martin's Press, ISBN 0-312-03813-5
- The Mensa Murders (as Lee Martin, 1991), St. Martin's Press, ISBN 0-312-05126-3
- Hacker (as Lee Martin, 1992), St. Martin's Press, ISBN 0-312-06990-1
- Inherited Murder (as Lee Martin, 1994), St. Martin's Press, ISBN 0-312-11415-X
- The Day That Dusty Died (as Lee Martin, 1994), St. Martin's Press, ISBN 0-312-09779-4
- Bird in a Cage (as Lee Martin, 1995), St. Martin's Press, ISBN 0-312-13028-7
- Genealogy of Murder (as Lee Martin, 1996), St. Martin's Press, ISBN 0-312-13975-6
- The Thursday Club (as Lee Martin, 1997), St. Martin's Press, ISBN 1-57008-315-0

==== Mark Shigata Mystery series ====
Set in Bayport, Texas.

- Death by Deception (1988), Walker & Company, ISBN 0-8027-5714-6
- The Eye of Anna (1989), Walker & Company, ISBN 0-8027-5749-9
- The Buzzards Must Also Be Fed (1991), Walker & Company, ISBN 0-8027-5773-1
- Exception to Murder (1992), Walker & Company, ISBN 0-8027-3203-8
- Yakuza, Go Home! (1993), Walker & Company, ISBN 0-8027-3226-7

=== Short fiction ===
- "'The Twelve Dancing Princesses' Revisited" in Once Upon a Crime (1998), Berkley Books, ISBN 0-425-17128-0
- "Evelyn Lying There" in Women of Mystery II (1994), Berkley Books, ISBN 0-425-15054-2

=== Non-fiction ===
- Scene of the Crime: A Writer's Guide to Crime-Scene Investigations (1992), Writer's Digest Books, ISBN 0-89879-518-4
- Amateur Detectives: A Writer's Guide to How Private Citizens Solve Criminal Cases (1996), Writer's Digest Books, ISBN 0-89879-725-X
