= Suzanne North =

Canadian writer

- Born: Suzanne North; 1945 (age 79–80); Calgary, Alberta, Canada
- Occupation: Author

Suzanne North (born 1945) is a Canadian author based out of Saskatoon, Saskatchewan.

== Career ==
North has written for magazines, documentary films and CBC Television. She is also the author of the Phoebe Fairfax mystery series. Her mystery novels have sold well in Canada (her first book is in its third printing) as well as internationally (most notably Germany and Iceland). Her latest work, a literary novel, Flying Time, was published in 2014. The Historical Novel Society has written that "Flying Time is an example of what literary historical fiction does well: provides a snapshot of a time and place through the small evolutions in relationships in a clearly defined context. North's evocation of Calgary in 1939 is masterly, a clear sketch that is never too heavy on detail."

David Skene-Melvin's chapter "Canadian Crime Writing in English" found in Detecting Canada: Essays on Canadian Crime Fiction, Television, and Film highlights North's importance to the genre of Crime fiction in Canada: "One of the more welcome aspects of the proliferation of crime writing during the last generation is the exponential increase in female detectives by female writers" including Suzanne North.

Her 1994 mystery, Healthy, Wealthy and Dead (NeWest Press), was on the Crime Writers of Canada's best-seller list and was short-listed for the Arthur Ellis Award.

== Selected works ==
- — (1994). Healthy Wealthy, & Dead. NeWest Publishers, Limited. ISBN 9780920897553.
- — (1996). Seeing is Deceiving. Starburst Digital Rights International Incorporated. ISBN 9781928014027.
- — (2002). Bones to Pick. Starburst Digital Rights International Incorporated. ISBN 9781928014041.
- — (2014). Flying Time. Brindle and Glass. ISBN 9781927366233.
