= Maris Soule =

American writer

- Born: June 19, 1939 (age 87); Oakland, California, U.S.
- Education: University of California, Davis (BA)
- Occupation: Author
- Writing career
- Genres: Romance; romantic suspense; mystery fiction

Maris Soule (born June 19, 1939) is an American author of romance and romantic suspense novels, mysteries, and short stories. Her latest book, Eat Crow and Die, is a mystery novel. Her books feature a variety of settings and situations, including the Iditarod Trail Sled Dog Race, Search and Rescue dogs, barrel racing, dressage, and a Rhodesian Ridgeback puppy.

== Biography ==
Maris Soule was born in Oakland, California. She graduated from U.C. Davis with a B.A. After receiving a Lifetime Teaching Credential from U.C. Berkeley, she taught art and math at Rio Americano High School, Carmichael, California, La Cumbre Junior High School, Santa Barbara, California, and Galesburg-Augusta High School, Galesburg, Michigan. She married in 1968, and she and her husband moved to Michigan in 1970.

== Recognition and awards ==
Several of her books have been finalists or winners of awards from the Romance Writers of America and the Wisconsin Romance Writers of America.

- Finalist for RWA's 1988 RITA Award (known then as the Golden Medallion Award) for A Winning Combination
- First Place, Short Contemporary, WisRWA Write Touch: Readers' Choice Award
- First Place, Traditional Category, WisRWA Write Touch: Readers' Choice Award for Substitute Mom
- Second Place, 1998 Kiss of Death contest for Shelter from the Storm
- Finalist for 1999 RITA Award and 3rd in Kiss of Death contest for Chase the Dream
- Winner of 2017 Mystery/Thriller division of the Florida Writers Associations Royal Palm Literary Award for "Echoes of Terror."

== Bibliography ==
- Echoes of Terror (2017)
- A Killer Past (2015)
- Eat Crow and Die (2015)
- As the Crow Flies (2011)
- The Crows (2008)
- Paternity Lessons (1999)
- The Bachelor, the Beauty and the Blizzard (1998)
- Chase the Dream (1998)
- Shelter from the Storm (1997)
- Heiress Seeking Perfect Husband (1997)
- Destiny Unknown (1997)
- Destiny Strikes Twice (1996)
- Substitute Mom (1996)
- Thrill of the Chase (1995)
- Dark Temptation (1995)
- Stop the Wedding (1994)
- No Promises Made (1994)
- No Strings Attached (1993)
- Con Man (1993)
- Lyon's Pride (1993)
- Missy's Proposition (1992)
- Jared's Lady (1991)
- Storybook Hero (1989)
- The Law of Nature (1988)
- The Best of Everything (1988)
- A Winning Combination (1987)
- Sounds Like Love (1986)
- Lost and Found (1985)
- First Impressions (1983)
