= T. Lynn Ocean =

American writer

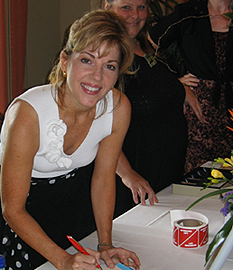
- Author T. Lynn Ocean at a book signing in Myrtle Beach, SC.
- Occupation: Novelist
- Writing career
- Genres: Thriller, Fiction, Mystery
- Website: www.tlynnocean.com

T. Lynn Ocean is an American author of present-day Southern fiction. Ocean's first publication was in the 'North Myrtle Beach Times,' after she pleaded the editor and offered to write for free. Her first column, the 'Humor Me', was published in 1995. In 2005, St. Martin's Press released her first novel, "Fool Me Once."

Often working as a freelance writer for major newspapers and publications—including her local paper, The Sun News—Ocean has had three novels published. These are Fool Me Once, Sweet Home Carolina, and Southern Fatality. Her most recent novel, Southern Fatality, is the first installment of a mystery series featuring the character Jersey Barnes. Her other novel Southern Poison was published on September 2, 2008

She was a guest author at the 2007 South Carolina Book Festival held in Columbia, South Carolina, and the 2008 Virginia Festival of the Book in Charlottesville, Virginia.

Ocean is a member of the Mystery Writers Association, as well as a member of International Thriller Writers. She lives in Myrtle Beach, South Carolina, and earned her degree from Texas State University.

Ocean and her husband live in Little River, South Carolina.

== Novels ==
Year	Title	ISBN	Comments
2005	Fool Me Once	ISBN 0-312-33669-1	First Edition.
2006	Sweet Home Carolina	ISBN 0-312-34334-5	First Edition.
2007	Southern Fatality : a Jersey Barnes Mystery	ISBN 978-0-312-37367-2	Was released as a paperback on July 29th 2008.
2008	Southern Poison: a Jersey Barnes Mystery	ISBN 978-0-312-38346-6	Second Jersey Barnes Mystery.
2014	Mayhem in Myrtle Beach		Ebook
2014	Carolina Booty	ISBN 978-1-310-059551	First Edition
2014	Choosing Charleston		Ebook
