= Ronald J. Watkins =

American writer

Ronald J. Watkins, b.1945 in Phoenix, Arizona is an American writer of non-fiction. The author has also served as ghostwriter, collaborator or editor for more than 30 other books. He is founder and principal writer for Watkins & Associates.

== Background ==
Watkins holds a Bachelor of Arts in history and a Master of Science in Justice Studies. Following university, he worked as a probation officer and presentencing investigator for the Superior Court in Phoenix, Arizona. He is a former chief administrative law judge and was assistant director of the Arizona Department of Insurance where he served as Arizona's chief insurance fraud investigator.

== Books ==
In 1993 he published Birthright, the saga of the Shoen family which founded and owned U-Haul International and of the then unsolved murder of Eva Shoen. When he refused to identify his sources under subpoena he was twice found in contempt by a Federal court, with his position being upheld by the Ninth Circuit on both occasions. In 1993, the United States Court of Appeals (Ninth Circuit) in Shoen v. Shoen, 5 Frd 1289 (9th Cir. 1993) and in Shoen v. Shoen, 48F 3d 412 (9th Cir.1995). These established case law sustaining the right of authors of non-fiction books to not identify either confidential or non-confidential sources. Watkins was a finalist for the PEN American Newman's Own First Amendment Award for his defense of the First Amendment.

His first book, High Crimes and Misdemeanors, was an account of the impeachment of Arizona's governor, Evan Mecham. Written just one year after events and based on hundreds of interviews with participants, it remains the definitive account of the last impeachment of an American governor.

He then published Evil Intentions, the story of the brutal murder of Suzanne Rossetti in Phoenix, Arizona. It was followed a few years later by Against Her Will, the story of the murder of Kelly Tinyes in Valley Stream, Long Island, New York.

In 2003, John Murray (UK) published his book, Unknown Seas: How Vasco da Gama Opened the East. The following year, Watkins was nominated for The Mountbatten Maritime Prize in the United Kingdom. The book has since been published in Portuguese in Brazil and in Czech in the Czech Republic.

Watkins is co-author with Charles G. Irion on the Summit Murder Series, mystery novels set on the highest mountains in the world. In all, the Series is projected to include eight books. The first three include: Murder on Everest, Abandoned on Everest, and Murder on Elbrus.

== Public and media appearances ==
Watkins has been called on by the media and has made a number of television and radio appearances, including:

- Dominick Dunne's Power, Privilege and Justice
- PrimeTime! with Tom Brokow and Katie Couric
- Under Scrutiny with Jane Wallace
- Geraldo with Geraldo Rivera
- American Forum [national radio]

== Works ==
- Murder on Everest (Irion Books, 2010, 328 pp.) ISBN 978-0-9841618-0-5
- Abandoned on Everest (Irion Books, 2010, 160 pp.) ISBN 978-0-9841618-1-2
- Unknown Seas (John Murray Publisher UK, 2003, 336 pp.) ISBN 978-0-7195-6417-8
- Birthright (William Morrow & Co., 1993, 425 pp.) ISBN 978-0-688-11255-4
- Evil Intentions (William Morrow & Co., 1992, 296 pp.) ISBN 978-0-688-10270-8
- Against Her Will (Pinnacle Books, 1995, 288 pp.) ISBN 978-0-7860-1388-3
- A Suspicion of Guilt (Virtual Publications, 2001, 376 pp.) ISBN 978-0-9679503-8-9
- High Crimes and Misdemeanors (William Morrow & Co., 1990, 395 pp.) ISBN 978-0-688-09051-7
