= Ray Daniel (author) =

American novelist

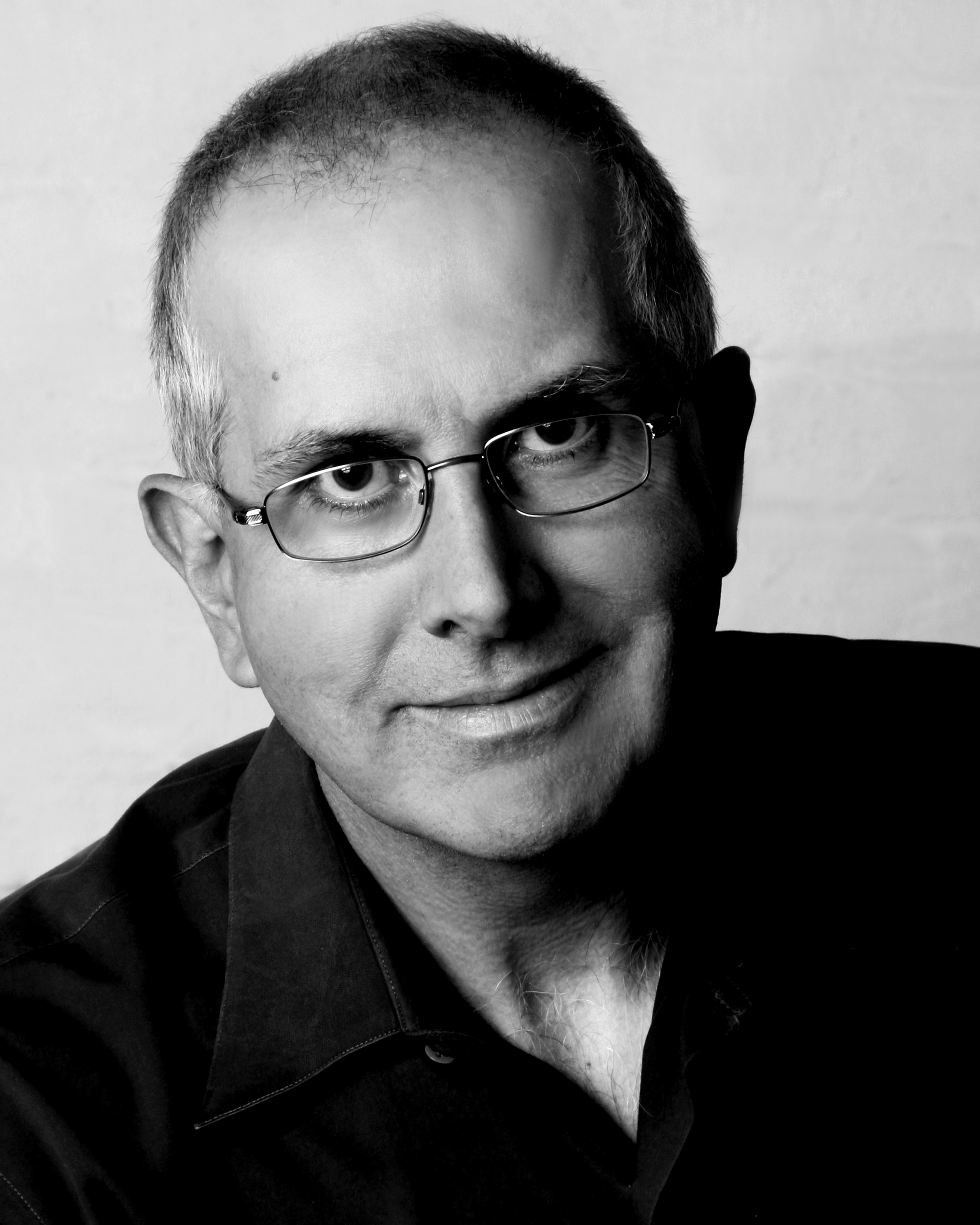
- Born: Ray Salemi; Boston, Massachusetts, U.S.
- Occupations: Novelist; writer; author
- Writing career
- Period: 2010–present
- Genres: Crime fiction, mystery, thriller
- Notable work: Tucker Mystery series of novels
- Website: www.raydanielmystery.com

Ray Daniel is an author of Boston-based crime fiction and is the author of the Tucker Mysteries.

His short stories “Give Me a Dollar” won a 2014 Derringer Award for short fiction and “Driving Miss Rachel” was chosen as a 2013 distinguished short story by Otto Penzler, editor of The Best American Mystery Stories 2013.

== Novels ==
Title	Year	ISBN
Terminated	2014	ISBN 978-0738740690
Corrupted Memory	2015	ISBN 978-0738742304
Child Not Found	2016	ISBN 978-0738742311
Hacked	2017	ISBN 978-0738751108
