= Linda Condon =

1919 novel by Joseph Hergesheimer

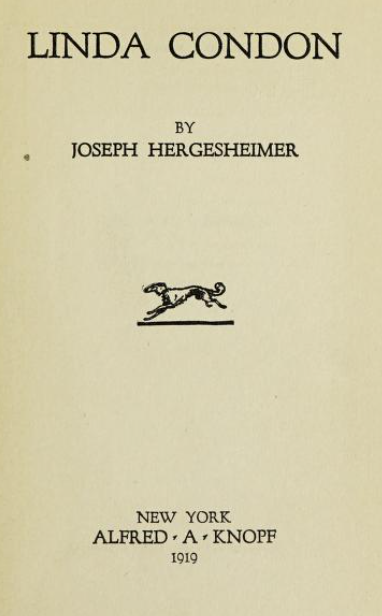
- Author: Joseph Hergesheimer
- Language: English
- Publisher: Alfred A. Knopf
- Publication date: 1919
- Publication place: United States

Linda Condon is a novel by Joseph Hergesheimer, published in 1919.

== Plot introduction ==
Linda Condon is about a wealthy woman—the eponymous heroine—who never learns to have, let alone show, any emotions or, as the narrator puts it, to "lose herself". Although she does not do anybody any harm, in the course of the novel Linda is likened to Siberia, described by her husband as a "woman of alabaster", and calls herself "the most sterile woman alive". Married at 18, she sees herself "in a place of little importance" and at the same time "bound on a journey with a hidden destination". Linda Condon is dedicated to Carl Van Vechten.

== Plot summary ==
Linda Condon is raised by her single mother, who denies the girl any information about her absentee father. Mother and daughter live together in a seemingly endless succession of hotels in various regions of the United States, and Linda receives little formal education. While Stella Condon frequently goes out with men of dubious reputation, her daughter, who is always loyal to her shallow and superficial mother, spends her early adolescent days alone in her hotel room or with other guests in the artificial and phony atmosphere of the lobby. Stella Condon does have a suitor, a self-made millionaire and widower of Jewish descent called Moses Feldt, but she explains to Linda that she is not going to repeat past mistakes by getting married again.

However, when Stella Condon realizes the onset of old age and her vanishing beauty, she consents to a marriage of convenience with Feldt. From one day to the next Linda's itinerant life is replaced by life in a palace-like New York mansion together with her mother, Feldt and his two daughters. Already at the early age of 15 Linda experiences a "sense of looking on, as if morning, noon and night she were at another long play. [...] Probably it would continue without change through her entire life."

Through Feldt's daughter Judith and her boyfriend Markue, Linda, not yet 18 years of age, is launched into New York society. At a party she meets Dodge Pleydon, a sculptor many years her senior who is fascinated by the young girl despite, or maybe because of, her frozen charm and subdued behaviour. Her first kiss, which she gets from Pleydon later that night, does not mean a lot to her, so she is hardly moved when he announces his intention to go abroad for an indefinite period of time.

Her life takes a decisive new direction when, after attending a concert, she is approached by her father's sister, who has recognized her immediately because, as she claims, Linda is taking after her father. Naturally curious to learn more about the paternal branch of her family, Linda accepts her aunt's invitation to visit her and her sister in Philadelphia and to stay in the house where her father, now dead, was raised. Her decision to go there leads to an ever-increasing estrangement from her mother. In Philadelphia, Linda is introduced to her aunts' 45-year-old nephew Arnaud Hallet, a lawyer and confirmed bachelor who immediately falls for the girl just like Pleydon before him. Caught between the two men, who both propose to her, Linda eventually decides to marry Hallet, with the fact that he has "a hundred thousand dollars a year" certainly adding to his attraction.

Seven years later, Arnaud and Linda Hallet have two children, Lowrie and Vigné. Remembering her own unhappy childhood spent in hotels, Linda realizes how differently from herself her children are being brought up. However, she feels inadequate as a wife and especially as a mother. She sees that both Lowrie and Vigné have inherited their love of books from their father, while she herself has never taken up reading. Also, she regrets not being able to play the piano. And although she is only in her late twenties, she imagines her beauty is fading without finding solace in the "vicarious immortality of children". She believes she has "lost her youth without any compensating gain of knowledge".

Several years pass until Lowrie becomes a law student at university. Vigné follows in her mother's and maternal grandmother's footsteps by getting married at the age of 18. Linda admires her daughter, who with perfect ease has picked an eligible young man, and whose "radiant happiness" is something she has never experienced herself.

When she learns that a public statue created by Pleydon has been destroyed she suddenly feels sympathy and maybe even more for the sculptor, who has always considered her his muse. Considering that Arnaud Hallet has "had over twenty years of her life, the best", Linda leaves him without a word to go and live with Pleydon. Once at his studio, she realizes that there is no way she could stay with that ageing, sickly man whose love for her could never be more than platonic. On the following day, she returns to her husband without ever telling him about her intended betrayal.

At the end of the novel, three years after her aborted decision to live with Pleydon, her son Lowrie marries a college-educated suffragette while Linda Hallet herself, while grieving over Pleydon's death, starts dyeing her hair in a fruitless struggle against time.

== Release details ==
- Joseph Hergesheimer: Linda Condon (Alfred A. Knopf: New York, 1919).
- e-book at Schulers Books Online, and Project Gutenberg.

== Quotations ==
- "Her [Linda's] life had taught her nothing if not the fact that a number of women figured in every man's history. It was deplorable but couldn't be avoided; and whether or not it continued after marriage depended on the cunning of any wife."
- "Selfishness was a reproach applied by those who failed to get what they wanted to all who succeeded."
- "She knew what troubled her [...] — the difficulties presented by the term "love". In her mind it was divided into two or three widely different aspects, phases which she was unable to reconcile. Her mother, in the beginning, had informed her that love was a nuisance. To be happy, a man must love you without any corresponding return; this was necessary to his complete management, the securing of the greatest possible amount of new clothes. It was as far as love should be allowed to enter marriage. But that reality, with a complete expression in shopping, was distant from the immaterial and delicate emotions that in her responded to Pleydon."

== See also ==
- psychological repression

== Read on: Mother-daughter relationship in fiction ==
- Grant Allen: The Woman Who Did (novel)
- James M. Cain: Mildred Pierce (novel)
- Shelagh Delaney: A Taste of Honey (play)
- P. D. James: Innocent Blood (novel)
- Marsha Norman: 'night, Mother (play)
- Joyce Carol Oates: The Eclipse (play)
- Ruth Rendell: The Crocodile Bird (novel)
- Mona Simpson: Anywhere but Here (novel)
