= Grow house =

Property used for marijuana cultivation

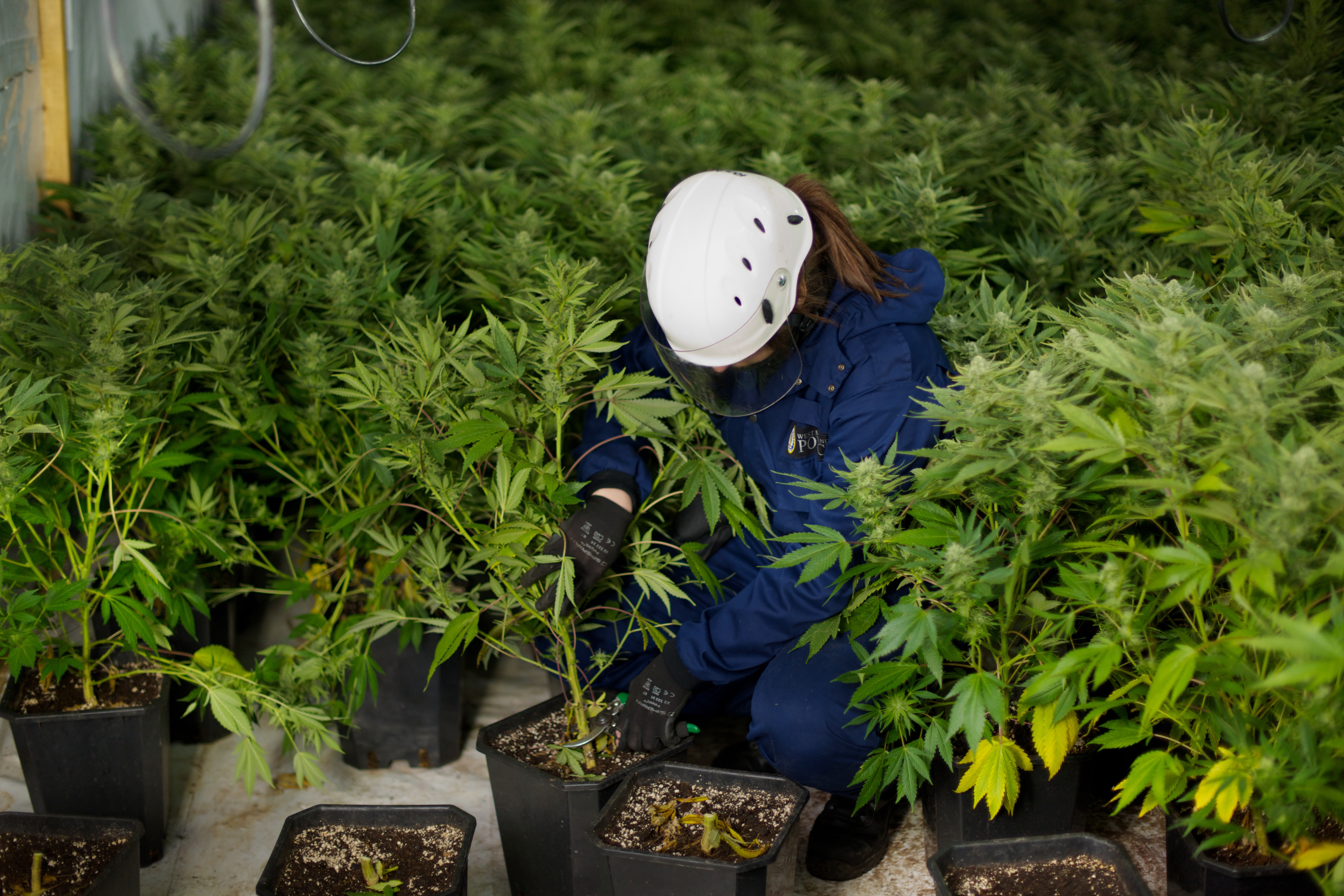
Illegal grow house being dismantled by West Midlands Police

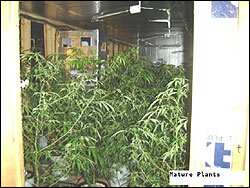
Cannabis plants found in a grow house

A grow house is a property, usually located in a suburban residential neighbourhood, that is primarily used for the black market production of marijuana. It may be used for the cultivation of other drugs such as psilocybin mushrooms.

The houses are typically outfitted with extensive hydroponic equipment to provide water, food, and light to the plants, and the houses themselves are usually kept in good condition to blend in with the neighbourhood. Illegal electrical hookups are a common feature of grow houses, to both save money and to make it harder for authorities to identify them due to their unusually high electrical usage.

In 2025, there are mobile interiorscape businesses that sell grow kits and can build grow houses in most states where marijuana is legal.

== Law enforcement response ==
In the United Kingdom illegal cannabis growers usually bypass electric meter readers and "abstract" the electricity which is an offence in its own right. In the last ten years authorities in both the United Kingdom and the United States of America have become more aware of grow houses and have introduced policies focusing law enforcement, local government authorities, energy providers and landlords on disruption and detection of illegal grow houses. In the United Kingdom the Proceeds of Crime Bill targets criminal profits and unevidenced sources of income from convicted drug producers. Local media run regular stories advising local people on what to look out for including rarely visited properties with blacked out windows or with high levels of humidity on the inside. However, professional criminals are often able to defeat these efforts with the use of low-power lighting, activated charcoal filters, tube or inline fans, cooling systems and hydroponic systems.

== In popular culture ==
Grow House, a 2017 comedy film by DJ Pooh, concerns two stoners who start up a grow house operation with no idea how to do it.

In Tigerlily's Orchids, a 2010 novel by British crime-writer Ruth Rendell, a central plot theme is the operation of a grow house. A neighbour assumes his own house is so warm in winter because he has good insulation. However, his house is actually kept warm by the high heat from the grow house.

In the second season of the TV series Weeds, the protagonist begins operating a grow house to better support her marijuana-selling operation.

== See also ==
- Cannabis cultivation
- Cannabis culture
- Grow shop
- Headshop
- Illegal drug trade
- Rolling meth lab, a transportable laboratory for producing methamphetamine
