= Tree of Hands =

- Directed by: Giles Foster
- Written by: Gordon Williams
- Based on: The Tree of Hands by Ruth Rendell
- Produced by: Ann Scott
- Starring: Helen Shaver; Lauren Bacall; Malcolm Stoddard; Peter Firth
- Cinematography: Kenneth MacMillan
- Edited by: David Martin
- Music by: Richard Hartley
- Production companies: Granada Film Productions; British Screen Productions; Greenpoint Films
- Distributed by: Cannon Film Distributors
- Release date: 7 March 1989
- Running time: 89 minutes
- Country: United Kingdom
- Language: English
- Budget: £2 million
- Box office: £2,458 (UK)

Tree of Hands (released in the US as Innocent Victim) is a 1989 British psychological drama film directed by Giles Foster and starring Helen Shaver, Lauren Bacall, Malcolm Stoddard and Peter Firth. It is based on the 1984 novel The Tree of Hands by Ruth Rendell.

== Plot ==
Benet Archdale (Helen Shaver), a London-based best-selling author who has just written a controversial novel, lives alone with her young son. Benet's mother, Marsha (Lauren Bacall), visiting from the United States, is a manic-depressive who has psychotic episodes. When Benet's young son dies, Marsha kidnaps a local child to serve as a substitute. Benet believes she should return the child but upon investigation she finds out that the child has been severely abused by his parents. After the child's disappearance, the parents are charged with the murder.

== Cast ==
- Helen Shaver as Benet Archdale
- Lauren Bacall as Marsha Archdale
- Malcolm Stoddard as Ian Raeburn
- Peter Firth as Terence
- Paul McGann as Barry
- Kate Hardie as Carol
- Tony Haygarth as Kostas
- Phyllida Law as Julia
- David Schofield as Detective Inspector
- Amanda Dickinson as Molly
- Fiona McAlpine as Neighbour
- Julie Jupp as Neighbour's Daughter
- Sean Blowers as Detective
- Allan Mitchell as Consultant
- Simon Prebble as Newscaster
- Barnaby Brown as Jason
- Charles Pountney as James
