= Means of Evil =

1979 short story collection by Ruth Rendell

- First edition
- Author: Ruth Rendell
- Language: English
- Genre: Crime, mystery
- Publisher: Hutchinson
- Publication date: 8 October 1979
- Publication place: United Kingdom
- Media type: Print (hardback & paperback)
- Pages: 174 pp (first edition, hardback)
- ISBN: 0-09-139630-1 (first edition, hardback)
- OCLC: 6167185
- Preceded by: Make Death Love Me
- Followed by: The Lake of Darkness

Means of Evil is a collection of short stories by British writer Ruth Rendell.

== Contents ==
The collection contains five stories, all featuring Inspector Wexford:

1. "Means of Evil"
2. "Old Wives Tales"
3. "Ginger and the Kingsmarkham Chalk Circle"
4. "Achilles Heel"
5. "When the Wedding Was Over"

Of these short stories, three were the basis of episodes in the Inspector Wexford television series - "Means of Evil", "Ginger and the Kingsmarkham Chalk Circle" (filmed as No Crying He Makes) and "Achilles Heel".

== Reception ==
Kirkus Reviews described the book as "Five Inspector Wexford stories that show Rendell at her least distinctive - the full-length Wexfords and non-Wexford novels and stories are all superior" but added that "Rendell never sinks below a certain, remarkably high, level" and concluded "Second-string Rendell, then - which means, by any other standards, perfectly solid and tremendously intelligent, invisibly stylish work".

In a 2007 review of Rendell's Collected Stories, The Guardian notes that Wexford "appears in the late 1970s' Means of Evil, as a man defiantly out of time with the decade of IRA bombs and bent coppers".
