= The Keys to the Street =

1996 novel by Ruth Rendell

- First edition (UK)
- Author: Ruth Rendell
- Language: English
- Genre: Crime; Mystery; Thriller
- Publisher: Hutchinson (UK); Crown (US); Doubleday Canada (Canada)
- Publication date: 1996
- Publication place: United Kingdom
- Media type: Print (hardback & paperback)
- Pages: 310 pp
- ISBN: 0-09-180163-X
- OCLC: 222155611

The Keys to the Street is a crime novel by British writer Ruth Rendell published in 1996.

== Synopsis ==
Against the will of her boyfriend, Alistair, Mary Jago volunteers to donate bone marrow. He beats her after finding out, so she breaks up with him and goes house-sitting for a rich couple in London. Leslie Bean, an old dog-walker, comes there twice a day to take the Shih Tzu Gushi out along with five other dogs.

Mary makes an appointment with Leo Nash, the leukemia patient whose life she prolonged. Although he's secretive about his private life and doesn't want her to see his brother, she starts an affair with him, much to the dislike of Alistair.

Homeless people live in and around Regent's Park, including Roman Ashton, who's actually rich but prefers the street life since his wife and children died in a traffic accident. When Effie, a homeless woman, finds a corpse over the spikes of the park gate, he makes an anonymous phone call to the police. The victim is John Dominic Cahill, a homeless Irishman known as Decker. The newspaper nickname the killer 'The Impaler'.

A second victim follows: James "Pharaoh" Clancy, a homeless man who was always wearing keys around his neck. DI William Marnock starts suspecting Bean, because he has accused the victim of beating him up and had plans to pay Hob, a drug addict, to beat up Pharaoh.

In the meantime Mary starts asking questions about Leo and his mysterious brother.

== Characters ==
- Mary Jago: young woman who donates bone marrow
- Alistair: Mary's boyfriend, with whom she breaks up after he beats her
- Frederica Jago: Mary's grandmother
- DI William Marnock
- Leo Nash: leukemia patient whose life is prolonged by Mary's bone marrow donation
- Carl Nash: Leo's ten year older brother
- Leslie Bean: old dog-walker
- Valerie Conway: maid of one of Bean's clients, where Boris the borzoi lives
- Harvey Owen Bennett ("Hob"): drug addict who beats people up for money
- Deborah Cox: woman from the Harvest Trust, the organizer of the bone marrow donation
- Dorothea Borwick: curator of the Irene Adler Museum, Mary's employer
- Roman Ashton: rich man who chose to live on the streets after his wife and kids died in a traffic accident.
- John Dominic Cahill ("Decker"): homeless Irishman, first victim
- James Victor Clancy ("Pharaoh"): homeless man who wears a lot of keys around his neck
- David George Kneller ("Nello"): homeless man
- "Dill": homeless man
- "Effie": homeless woman
- "Tikka man": delivery man from the Express Tikka and Pizza

== Reception ==
John Mullan in The Guardian wrote: "There's a manipulative plotter at work in The Keys to the Street, and it is the author."

== Adaptation ==
British-American director Christopher Nolan had adapted the book into a screenplay which he originally planned to direct for Fox Searchlight, but moved on to make Batman Begins at Warner Bros. instead, citing the theme of the story being too similar to his previous films at the time. As of 2013, it was still in development.
