= Alias Betty =

2001 film by Claude Miller

- Film poster
- Directed by: Claude Miller
- Screenplay by: Claude Miller
- Based on: The Tree of Hands by Ruth Rendell
- Produced by: Yves Marmion
- Starring: Sandrine Kiberlain; Nicole Garcia; Mathilde Seigner
- Cinematography: Christophe Pollock
- Edited by: Véronique Lange
- Music by: François Dompierre
- Production companies: Canal+ France 2 Cinéma; Go Films; Les Films de la Boissière
- Distributed by: UGC Fox Distribution (France)
- Release dates: 1 September 2001 (Montreal); 24 October 2001 (France)
- Running time: 103 minutes
- Countries: France; Canada
- Language: French
- Budget: $9 million
- Box office: $468.000

Alias Betty (French: Betty Fisher et autres histoires) is a 2001 French drama film directed by Claude Miller.

The film won several international film festival awards. On Rotten Tomatoes it has an approval rating of 92% based on 51 reviews.

== Cast ==
- Sandrine Kiberlain - Betty Fisher
- Nicole Garcia - Margot Fisher
- Mathilde Seigner - Carole Novacki
- Luck Mervil - François Diembele
- Édouard Baer - Alex Basato
- Béatrice Agenin - Alex's mistress
- Stéphane Freiss - Edouard
- Yves Jacques - René the Canadian
- Roschdy Zem - Dr. Jerome Castang
- Consuelo De Haviland - Madame Barsky
- Yves Verhoeven - Martinaud
- Michaël Abiteboul - Milo
- Samir Guesmi - Inspector
- Annie Mercier - Jacqueline
