= A Sight for Sore Eyes =

A Sight for Sore Eyes may refer to:

- A Sight for Sore Eyes (film), a 2005 short film
- "Sight for Sore Eyes", a song by M People
- A Sight for Sore Eyes (novel), a 1998 novel by Ruth Rendell
- "A Sight for Sore Eyes", a song by Tom Waits from the album Foreign Affairs
