= Adam and Eve and Pinch Me (Rendell novel) =

2001 novel by Ruth Rendell

- Author: Ruth Rendell
- Language: English
- Genre: Crime novel
- Publisher: Hutchinson (UK); Crown (US); Doubleday Canada (Canada)
- Publication date: 30 August 2001
- Publication place: United Kingdom
- Media type: Print (Hardcover & Paperback)
- Pages: 388 pp
- ISBN: 0-09-179434-X
- OCLC: 47036673

Adam and Eve and Pinch Me (2001) is a psychological thriller novel by English crime writer Ruth Rendell.

== Reception ==
Judith Evans of the St. Louis Post-Dispatch wrote that Rendell "puts together these disparate characters in an absorbing story that is part suspense and part psychological drama." Marcus Eliason of the Associated Press wrote that it is "worth remarking on Rendell's attention to detail and the customary steely compassion with which she explores the comedy and pain of modern life."
