= The Child's Child =

2012 novel by Ruth Rendell

- First edition (publ. Scribner, US)
- Author: Barbara Vine
- Publisher: Scribner
- Publication date: December 4, 2012
- ISBN: 978-1-451-69489-5

The Child's Child is the 14th novel written by Ruth Rendell under the pseudonym Barbara Vine, and the first such novel in 4 years, since 2008's The Birthday Present. The novel was published in the United States in December 2012 and in the UK by Penguin Viking in March 2013. In a number of interviews Rendell has intimated that this will be the last novel she writes under the Vine pseudonym.

The narrator of the novel is a Grace Easton, a university lecturer writing a PhD thesis about unmarried mothers in Victorian literature. Grace shares a house inherited from their grandmother with her gay brother Andrew.
