= No Night Is Too Long =

- Based on: No Night Is Too Long by Ruth Rendell
- Written by: Kevin Elyot; Ruth Rendell
- Directed by: Tom Shankland
- Starring: Lee Williams; Marc Warren, Mikela J. Mikael
- Theme music composer: Christopher Dedrick

Production
- Producers: Phillippa Giles; Anne Marie La Traverse
- Cinematography: Paul Sarossy
- Editor: Allan Lee
- Running time: 116 minutes
- Production companies: BBC Films; Alliance Atlantis

Original release
- Network: BBC Two
- Release: 27 December 2002

No Night Is Too Long is a 2002 BBC dramatisation based on the 1994 novel of the same name by Barbara Vine (a pseudonym of Ruth Rendell), with a screenplay by Kevin Elyot. The title comes from a line in Richard Strauss's opera Der Rosenkavalier. The film received three nominations at the 18th Gemini Awards in Toronto.

== Summary ==
The plot follows a young man from Suffolk named Tim Cornish (Lee Williams), studying English at Warwick University; a bright student in his final year who leads a promiscuous lifestyle. The film includes a narration by Tim to another person, and flashbacks to the story he recounts.

One day he spots Dr. Ivo Steadman (Marc Warren), a paleontology lecturer, and engineers meetings with him in a lift and an office. At New Year, Ivo appears at Tim's house and there follows a passionate relationship between the two. Despite not seeing each other over the Easter break when Ivo's sister is visiting him, things go well until Ivo expresses his love for Tim. Haunted by past declarations from older boys when he was at school, Tim is completely unmoved. He amuses himself with a sexual encounter with another male student while Ivo is lecturing elsewhere for a day. On Ivo's return, preparing for a regular trip to Alaska where Tim will accompany Ivo, Tim admits this to Ivo, who cannot suppress his anger and punches Tim.

Once they arrive in Juneau, Alaska, Ivo explains that he has to replace a colleague on the next cruise trip, leaving a dismayed Tim in their hotel for ten days. During his absence Ivo writes a love letter each day, but Tim meets and becomes infatuated with a woman named Isabel (Mikela J. Mikael). They have a brief affair. When Ivo returns, he is met by an unenthusiastic Tim still in love with Isabel, hoping to meet her again in Vancouver; and growing impatient with Ivo. They then join the cruise with Ivo suspicious that Tim has had an affair. Exasperated, Ivo forces himself on Tim, then tells him that he will skip the next cruise so they can travel together in the USA and Canada, but Tim replies that he wants to leave him. Ivo is shocked and doesn't believe him. Tim tells him that he does not love Ivo and never has, that he is in love with Isabel and as soon as the cruise is over, he is going to be joining her. Ivo becomes so upset and enraged that he throws Tim on the bed and starts to choke him, but Tim throws him off.

The next morning the cruise group go to an island to look at dinosaur fossils. While the rest of the group explore the island, Ivo and Tim have a heated argument. Before Ivo has a chance to leave, Tim reveals that he would have left Ivo long ago if it wasn't for Isabel, and she was the only reason he stayed. This enrages Ivo, and in the ensuing fight, Tim accidentally throws him against the rocky mountainside and thinks he is dead. Tim flees to Vancouver without creating - he believes - any suspicion. Once there he fails to track down Isabel, but has a brief sexual relationship with a homeless drifter, Thierry, and begins to have hallucinations of seeing Ivo. Before returning to England Tim buys expensive items for Thierry with Ivo's credit card, giving Thierry the impression that Tim is rich; he also confesses to him that he has killed someone. Ivo, who survived his injury and was rescued a few days later, meanwhile travels to Vancouver to confront Isabel; unbeknownst to Tim, Isabel is Ivo's sister who had been asked to keep an eye on Tim's behaviour while Ivo was away lecturing on the first cruise. Ivo angrily reproaches her for seducing Tim, since she knew of Ivo's feelings.

A year later, back home, Tim receives anonymous letters from someone aware of his crime. Thierry shows up at Tim's house and it is clear Thierry wants money and hopes to rob Tim. He stays overnight but has disappeared by the morning.

Tim attends a performance of Der Rosenkavalier at the town music festival and at the end bumps into James, who had been one of his admirers at school, and is now a lawyer. He also sees Ivo in the foyer and rushes frightened from the theatre, believing himself to be pursued and finds himself cornered on the beach with Ivo. Tim allows Ivo to come to his house and discusses the previous events with him. Ivo asks for Isabel's scarf, which Tim has kept in a drawer with all his photos of Ivo – at this point Tim discovers that she is Ivo's sister. Tim invites Ivo to stay overnight but Ivo decides to leave, and Tim gives him the yellow coat Ivo had bought for him. Walking in the pouring rain to the hotel wearing Tim's coat, Ivo is murdered by Thierry, who mistakes him for Tim.

We now learn that the narration/voice-over by Tim has been addressed to James, as he needed someone to tell the whole story to. After James has left, Tim sits and looks at the photos of Ivo, when there is a knock at the door. It is Isabel, but Tim sinks to the floor, does not open the door, and Isabel walks away.

== Awards and nominations ==
The film received three nominations at the Canadian 18th Gemini Awards in 2003: Lee Williams for 'Best Performance by an Actor in a Leading Role in a Dramatic Program or Mini-Series', Christopher Dedrick for 'Best Original Music Score for a Program or Mini-Series', and seven individuals for Best Visual Effects.

== Cast ==
- Lee Williams as Tim Cornish
- Marc Warren as Dr. Ivo Steadman
- Mikela J. Mikael as Isabel
- Salvatore Antonio as Thierry Massin (as Salvatore Migliore)
- Beverley Breuer as Connie Dorral
- Rob Bruner as Nathan Hayward
- Denis Corbett as Passenger #2
- Philip Granger as Fergus McKenzie
- Mark Hildreth as James Gilman
- Liam McGuigan as Young Tim Cornish

== Music ==
The film makes reference to the opera Der Rosenkavalier in several ways. The film title comes from the closing pages of Act 2, in which Baron Ochs sings the phrase, "Ohne mich, ohne mich jeder Tag dir so bang ; Mit mir, mit mir keine Nacht dir so lang", which Tim, recalling his passionate times with Ivo, renders as "Without me, without me every day is a misery; With me, with me no night is too long." Tim listens to LPs of the opera at several points in the film and is listening to the opera on his walkman when he first goes to Ivo's office. The opera which Ivo comes to hear in Saxborough (and where Tim is also in the audience) is Der Rosenkavalier. The final credits of the film note that the recording used is one conducted by Georg Solti.

Apart from the use of Britten's Missa Brevis, the soundtrack was composed by Chris Dedrick.
