= Piranha to Scurfy =

2000 short story collection by Ruth Rendell

- First edition (UK)
- Author: Ruth Rendell
- Language: English
- Publisher: Hutchinson (UK); Crown (US); Doubleday Canada (Canada)
- Publication date: 7 September 2000
- Publication place: United Kingdom
- Media type: Print (hardback & paperback)
- Pages: 248
- ISBN: 0-09-179347-5

Piranha to Scurfy is a short story collection by British writer Ruth Rendell, published in 2000. The collection takes its unusual name from the first story featured, which itself is named after a volume of the Encyclopædia Britannica.

== Contents ==
The volume contains 9 short stories and 2 longer novellas:

1. Piranha to Scurfy (novella)
2. Computer Seance (NB: not included in the US edition)
3. Fair Exchange
4. The Wink
5. Catamount
6. Walter's Leg
7. The Professional
8. The Beach Butler
9. The Astronomical Scarf
10. High Mysterious Union (novella)
11. Myth (NB: not included in the US edition. Also re-published in 2003 in the US quarterly The Strand Magazine, issue 11, retitled "Paradise." )
