= The New Girlfriend (film) =

2014 film by François Ozon

- Theatrical release poster
- French: Une nouvelle amie
- Directed by: François Ozon
- Screenplay by: François Ozon
- Based on: The New Girlfriend by Ruth Rendell
- Produced by: Éric Altmayer; Nicolas Altmayer
- Starring: Romain Duris; Anaïs Demoustier; Raphaël Personnaz; Isild Le Besco; Aurore Clément; Jean-Claude Bolle-Reddat
- Cinematography: Pascal Marti
- Edited by: Laure Gardette
- Music by: Philippe Rombi
- Production companies: Mandarin Cinéma; Mars Films; France 2 Cinéma; FOZ
- Distributed by: Mars Distribution
- Release dates: 6 September 2014 (TIFF); 5 November 2014 (France)
- Running time: 107 minutes
- Country: France
- Language: French
- Budget: €8.9 million ($10 million)
- Box office: $5.2 million

The New Girlfriend (French: Une nouvelle amie) is a 2014 French erotic drama film written and directed by François Ozon, based on the short story of the same name by Ruth Rendell. It had its world premiere at the Toronto International Film Festival on 6 September 2014.

== Cast ==
- Romain Duris as David/Virginia
- Anaïs Demoustier as Claire
- Raphaël Personnaz as Gilles
- Isild Le Besco as Laura
- Aurore Clément as Liz
- Jean-Claude Bolle-Reddat as Robert
- Bruno Perard as Eva Carlton
- Claudine Chatel as nanny
- Anita Gillier as nurse
- Alex Fondja as caregiver
- Zita Hanrot as restaurant waitress

== Release ==
The New Girlfriend premiered at the 2014 Toronto International Film Festival on 6 September. The film was later screened at the San Sebastián Film Festival on 20 September 2014, where it won the Sebastiane Award. The jury commented, "[Ozon] calls into question the labels and roles of masculinity and femininity" and the jury "appreciates the contribution of this film to move towards a personal liberation, that could reaffirm the identity of every person". The film was also presented at the Zurich Film Festival on 2 October and the London Film Festival on 11 October. It was released theatrically in France on 5 November 2014 by Mars Distribution and in the United States on 18 September 2015 by Cohen Media Group.

== Critical response ==
Review aggregation website Rotten Tomatoes gives the film a score of 80% based on 84 reviews, with an average score of 6.8 out of 10. The website's critics consensus reads, "While flirting with camp, François Ozon's The New Girlfriend offers thoughtful – and humorous – commentary on sexual and gender identity." On Metacritic, the film has a score of 74 out of 100 from 22 critics, indicating "generally favorable reviews".

Writing for The Hollywood Reporter, David Rooney expressed his compliments on The New Girlfriend: "a delectable riff on transformation, desire and sexuality that blends the heightened reality of melodrama with mischievous humor and an understated strain of Hitchcockian suspense". At Variety, Justin Chang said, "even as [Ozon] heads down any number of tantalizing if borderline-nonsensical alleyways, Ozon maintains his diabolical wit, his infectious sense of play and his essential affection for his characters" and the film was "powered by beautifully controlled performances from Anaïs Demoustier and Romain Duris".

== Soundtrack ==
Une nouvelle amie

Soundtrack album by Various Artists
- Released: November 3, 2014
- Genre: Soundtrack
- Length: 46:46
- Label: Cristal Records
- Producer: Philippe Rombi

The soundtrack of The New Girlfriend was released on November 3, 2014. The song "Hot n Cold" by Katy Perry is played in the film but it is not available in the official soundtrack.

No.	Title	Length
1.	"Enfance"	3:08
2.	"Laura"	4:33
3.	"Le Parfum de Laura"	1:56
4.	"Rendez-Vous"	1:10
5.	"Créancy"	1:56
6.	"Promenade"	2:26
7.	"Maquillage"	2:05
8.	"Vêpres Solennelles Laudate Dominium K.339" (P.Coles, Kosice & Camerata Cassovia)	4:56
9.	"Une femme avec toi" (Nicole Croisille)	4:23
10.	"Follow Me" (Amanda Lear)	3:48
11.	"Nuit à Créancy"	3:07
12.	"La Vie sans Virginia"	3:25
13.	"C'est David Maintenant"	2:09
14.	"Lucie"	1:59
15.	"Sortie d'Ecole"	3:36
16.	"Générique Fin"	2:09
17.	"Une femme avec toi"

== Accolades ==
Award / Film Festival	Category	Recipients	Result
40th César Awards	Best Actor	Romain Duris	Nominated
40th César Awards	Best Costume Design	Pascaline Chavanne	Nominated
20th Lumière Awards	Best Actor	Romain Duris	Nominated
Prix Jacques Prévert du Scénario	Best Adaptation	François Ozon	Won
San Sebastián Film Festival	Sebastiane Award	The New Girlfriend	Won
Apolo Awards	Best Film	The New Girlfriend	Nominated
Apolo Awards	Best Director	François Ozon	Nominated
Apolo Awards	Best Adapted Screenplay	François Ozon	Nominated
Apolo Awards	Best Production Design	Michel Barthélémy, Pascal Leguellec and Nathalie Roubaud	Nominated
Apolo Awards	Best Costuming	Pascaline Chavanne	Won
Apolo Awards	Best Hair and Make-Up	Gill Robillard and Franck-Pascal Alquinet	Won
Apolo Awards	Best Original Music	Philippe Rombi	Nominated
Apolo Awards	Best Actor	Romain Duris	Won
Apolo Awards	Best Couple	Romain Duris and Anaïs Demoustier	Nominated
