= The Reason Why (disambiguation) =

The Reason Why is a 2010 album by Little Big Town

The Reason Why may also refer to

== Songs ==
- "The Reason Why", a song by Tommy Bruce 1969
- "The Reason Why", a song by the Byrds from the album Preflyte
- "The Reason Why", a song by Daryl Hall With Gulliver 1977
- "The Reason Why", a song by Vince Gill from These Days (Vince Gill album)
- "The Reason Why", title track from The Reason Why (album) by Little Big Town
- "The Reason Why" (song), a song by Italian singer-songwriter Lorenzo Fragola, released as a single in 2014
- "The Reason Why", a song by Twice from the album &Twice

== Books ==
- The Reason Why, a 1953 popular history book about the Charge of the Light Brigade by Cecil Woodham-Smith
- The Reason Why: An Anthology of the Murderous Mind, a 1995 non-fiction book by Ruth Rendell
- The Reason Why, a series of books (1856–63) by Robert Kemp Philp

== Films ==
- The Reason Why (film), a 1918 American drama film directed by Robert G. Vignola
