= Dark Corner =

Dark Corner or Dark Corners may refer to:

- Dark Corner, New South Wales, a community in Australia
- The Dark Corner, a 1946 film
- Dark Corners, a 2006 horror film
- Dark Corners (novel), a novel by Ruth Rendell
