= Going Wrong (disambiguation) =

Going Wrong is a 1990 novel by Ruth Rendell.

Going Wrong may also refer to:

- "Going Wrong" (song), a 2008 song by Armin van Buuren, DJ Shah and Chris Jones
- "Going Wrong", a song by Moby in the 2013 album Innocents
- "Going Wrong", three-part 1998 episodes in The Ruth Rendell Mysteries
