= The Barbara Vine Mysteries =

- Genre: Mystery
- Created by: Ruth Rendell
- Written by: Sandy Welch; Jacqueline Holborough
- Directed by: Tim Fywell
- Starring: Douglas Hodge; Jeremy Northam; Saira Todd; Michael Sheen; Paul Rhys; Arkie Whiteley; Helena Bonham Carter; Celia Imrie; Sophie Ward
- Composer: David Ferguson
- Country of origin: United Kingdom
- Original language: English
- No. of series: 3
- No. of episodes: 8

Production
- Executive producer: Rosanna Roditi
- Producer: Phillippa Giles
- Cinematography: Barry McCann; Rex Maidment
- Editor: Paul Garrick
- Running time: 50 minutes
- Production company: BBC Worldwide

Original release
- Network: BBC1
- Release: 10 May 1992 – 3 January 1994

The Barbara Vine Mysteries is a British television mystery drama series, principally written by Sandy Welch and Jacqueline Holborough and directly solely by Tim Fywell, that first broadcast on BBC1 on 10 May 1992.

Adapted from a series of novels written by Ruth Rendell under the pseudonym of Barbara Vine, the series was the BBC's attempt to rival ITV's ratings winner The Ruth Rendell Mysteries, which was set to lose its lead actor, George Baker, in the same year. Three series were broadcast, with the final episode broadcasting on 3 January 1994, shortly before The Ruth Rendell Mysteries went back into production, adapting Rendell's novels without the character of Inspector Wexford for the first time.

Certain aspects of each of the novels were modified for their television adaptations; the most notable of these being A Dark-Adapted Eye, which saw its storyline significantly altered, including the introduction of an entirely new character, an Italian lawyer played by Ciarán Hinds, who does not feature in the book. All three series were released as a complete box set via 2|Entertain DVD on 31 October 2005.

== Cast ==
=== A Fatal Inversion ===
- Douglas Hodge as Adam
- Jeremy Northam as Rufus
- Saira Todd as Zosie
- Rachel Joyce as Anne
- Patricia Kerrigan as Marigold
- Gordon Warnecke as Shiva
- Michael Simkins as D.C. Stretton
- Julia Ford as Vivien
- Janet Steel as Lily
- Philip Bowen as Alec Chipstead
- Jane Wymark as Meg Chipstead
- Nicholas Woodeson as Insp. Winder
- Clara Salaman as Mary
- Philip Glenister as D.C. McCann

=== Gallowglass ===
- Michael Sheen as Joe
- Paul Rhys as Sandor
- Arkie Whiteley as Nina
- John McArdle as Paul Garnet
- Gary Waldhorn as Ralph Apsoland
- Harriet Owen as Jessica
- Claire Hackett as Tilly
- Nerys Hughes as Diana
- Barbara Hicks as Joan
- Trevor Cooper as Stan
- Paolo Giovannucci as Cesare
- Susan Porrett as Doreen
- Bruno Scipioni as Adelmo
- Stefanie McFeat as Debbie

=== A Dark-Adapted Eye ===
- Helena Bonham Carter as Faith Severn
- Celia Imrie as Vera
- Sophie Ward as Eden
- Robin Ellis as John
- Bernice Stegers as Vranni
- William Gaminara as Andrew
- Pip Torrens as Chad
- Rachel Bell as Mrs. Morell
- Steven Mackintosh as Francis
- Polly Adams as Helen
- Kelly Marcel as Young Vera
- David Cann as Albert March
- Jane Hollowood as Mrs. March
- Randal Herley as General
- Richard Syms as Rev. Morell
- Emma Shaw as Josie Cambus

== Episodes ==
=== Series 1 (1992) ===
No.	Title	Directed by	Written by	Original release date
1	"A Fatal Inversion: Part 1"	Tim Fywell	Sandy Welch	10 May 1992
Five students who share a terrible secret vow never to see each other again, but when the bodies of a woman and child are unearthed, a twelve-year-old tragedy is revealed.
2	"A Fatal Inversion: Part 2"	Tim Fywell	Sandy Welch	17 May 1992
Rufus' chilling words echo across the twelve years that separate him and Adam as they prepare to confront their terrible past.
3	"A Fatal Inversion: Part 3"	Tim Fywell	Sandy Welch	24 May 1992
The police investigation into the murder closes in on Adam and Rufus. Both have everything to lose, but are powerless to stop events as the appalling truth begins to unfold.

=== Series 2 (1993) ===
No.	Title	Directed by	Written by	Original release date
1	"Gallowglass: Part 1"	Tim Fywell	Jacqueline Holborough	10 January 1993
Joe's attempt at committing suicide by throwing himself in front of an oncoming tube train is prevented by the handsome and charming Sandor, who then insists that Joe's life now belongs to him. Now a 'gallowglass', Joe is forced to assist Sandor with the kidnapping of a wealthy married woman, Nina, whom Sandor is obsessed with. Sandor's adopted sister, Tilly, also assists with the plot, kidnapping the daughter of Nina's bodyguard.
2	"Gallowglass: Part 2"	Tim Fywell	Jacqueline Holborough	17 January 1993
Paul ignores the demands of the kidnappers who are out to get the "princess", believing he can handle the situation himself.
3	"Gallowglass: Part 3"	Tim Fywell	Jacqueline Holborough	24 January 1993
The kidnappers are holding Jessica but still want Nina, forcing Paul to choose between his daughter and the woman he is in love with. When the ransom is finally paid, Nina and the child are both released; forcing Sandor to take his own life by jumping into the path of an oncoming train, as Joe watches on. Nina is then lured to her death by Gianni, a former gay partner of Sandor, and her body is found buried in woodland a few days later. Sandor's mother, who had no other children, then accepts Joe as her second son, and he begins a relationship with Tilly.

=== Series 3 (1994) ===
No.	Title	Directed by	Written by	Original release date
1	"A Dark-Adapted Eye: Part 1"	Tim Fywell	Sandy Welch	2 January 1994
Faith is evacuated from London to live with her aunts Vera and Eden in idyllic rural Suffolk, but behind the village's picturesque facade lies a history of hatred that finally explodes into violence.
2	"A Dark-Adapted Eye: Part 2"	Tim Fywell	Sandy Welch	3 January 1994
The smouldering tension between sisters Vera and Eden escalates to a murderous climax. And the older she becomes, the more Faith realises she must confront the dark secrets of a family that will never bare its soul.
