= Giles Foster =

English television director

Giles Foster has been an English television director since 1975, specialising in television dramas. He has also directed in Australia and in Germany (2012-2014). He wrote some television dramas in the 1970s.

He is from Bath, Somerset and was educated at Monkton Combe School.

== TV directed ==
Foster was nominated three times for BAFTA awards for Silas Marner (1985), Talking Heads (A Lady of Letters) (1987), and won Best Single Drama for his film Hotel du Lac (1986). He also directed the television series Four Seasons (2008) which was rewritten to be set in his home town of Bath.

== Selected filmography ==
- Devices and Desires (1976) - based on the life of John Skinner
- The Obelisk (1977) - based on a short story by E. M. Forster
- Cries from a Watchtower (1979)
- All Day on the Sands (1979)
- Chance of a Lifetime (1980)
- Last Summer's Child (1981)
- A Woman of No Importance (1982)
- Say Something Happened (1982)
- Farmers Arms (1983)
- Last Summer's Child (1981)
- The Aerodrome (1983) — based on a novel by Rex Warner
- Dutch Girls (1985)
- Silas Marner (1985) — based on Silas Marner by George Eliot
- Hotel du Lac (1986) — based on Hotel du Lac by Anita Brookner
- Northanger Abbey (1987) — based on Northanger Abbey by Jane Austen
- Consuming Passions (1988) — based on Secrets by Michael Palin and Terry Jones
- Tree of Hands (1989) — based on The Tree of Hands by Ruth Rendell
- Monster Maker (1989) — based on a novel by Nicholas Fisk
- The Lilac Bus (1990) — based on The Lilac Bus by Maeve Binchy
- The Rector's Wife (1994) — based on a novel by Joanna Trollope
- Oliver's Travels (1995) — based on a novel by Alan Plater
- Coming Home (1998) — based on a novel by Rosamunde Pilcher
- Relative Strangers (1999)
- The Prince and the Pauper (2000) — based on The Prince and the Pauper by Mark Twain
- Bertie and Elizabeth (2002)
- Summer Solstice (2005) — based on a story by Rosamunde Pilcher
- Starting Over (2007) — based on a novel by Robin Pilcher
- Four Seasons (2008) — based on a story by Rosamunde Pilcher
- Rosamunde Pilcher's Shades of Love (2010) — based on a story by Rosamunde Pilcher
- The Other Wife (2012) — based on a story by Rosamunde Pilcher
- Unknown Heart (2014) — based on a story by Rosamunde Pilcher
