= Rottweiler (disambiguation) =

Rottweiler is a breed of dog.

Rottweiler can also refer to:

- Rottweiler (film), a 2004 Spanish horror film
- an alternate title for Dogs of Hell (sometimes called Rottweiler: Dogs of Hell), a 1982 American horror film
- The Rottweiler, a novel about a serial killer
- The Rottweilers, a professional wrestling stable
- an inhabitant of Rottweil, Germany
