= Birthday present =

Birthday present may refer to:

- A present given in celebration of a person's birthday
- The Birthday Present, 1957 film
- The Birthday Present (novel), a 2008 novel by Ruth Rendell
- "The Birthday Present" (Dirty Sexy Money), a 2008 television episode
- "Birthday Presence" a 2009 episode of Ghost Whisperer
