= The Crocodile Bird =

1993 novel by Ruth Rendell

- Author: Ruth Rendell
- Language: English
- Genre: Crime/Mystery novel
- Publisher: Hutchinson (UK); Crown (US); Doubleday Canada (Canada)
- Publication date: 2 September 1993
- Publication place: United Kingdom
- Media type: Print (Hardback & Paperback)
- ISBN: 0-09-177636-8
- OCLC: 29328885

The Crocodile Bird is a 1993 novel by British writer Ruth Rendell.

== Reception ==
Jonathan Kirsch of the Los Angeles Times wrote that Rendell "tells her story with such elegance and restraint, with such a literate voice and an insightful mind, that her book transcends the mystery genre and achieves something sublime." Nancy Pate of the Orlando Sentinel opines that Rendell "approaches stories from unexpected angles, parceling out surprises that seem exactly right in retrospect."
