= The Water's Lovely =

2006 novel by Ruth Rendell

- Author: Ruth Rendell
- Language: English
- Genre: Crime/Mystery novel
- Publisher: Hutchinson (UK); Crown (US); Doubleday (Canada)
- Publication date: 2006
- Publication place: United Kingdom
- Media type: Print (Paperback & Hardback)
- ISBN: 0-09-179728-4
- OCLC: 67374395

The Water's Lovely is a 2006 novel by British writer Ruth Rendell. It is not part of her Inspector Wexford series.

== Plot summary ==
Ismay Sealand believes that her younger sister, Heather, murdered their stepfather Guy when they were teenagers. Ismay and her mother, Beatrix, returned from shopping for a new school uniform to find Guy drowned in his bath and only Heather home. Although both Ismay and her mother believe Heather drowned Guy – who was weak from a virus – there was no evidence and so at the inquest the death was ruled accidental. Ismay thinks Heather murdered Guy because he made sexual advances to her, Ismay, and Heather wished to protect her. In fact Ismay encouraged Guy's interest and hoped he would come to her bedroom and have sex with her.

Now in their twenties, Ismay and Heather live in the same house, which has been divided into two flats. They live together downstairs, and their mother, who became mentally ill after Guy's death, lives with her sister Pamela in the upstairs. Ismay remains haunted by what happened all those years ago. Ismay is desperately in love with Andrew Campbell-Sedge, who looks very like her dead stepfather, and who does not get on with Heather.

Meanwhile, Edmund Litton's mother, Irene, tries to set him up with Marion Melville, a thin darting woman with bright red hair who has befriended a number of elderly people in the area. Horrified by this idea Edmund sets up an alternative date with a woman who works in the catering department of the hospice where he works, Heather Sealand. Their date is more successful than expected and the two begin to fall in love. This causes a rift with Edmund's mother, who enjoyed being the only woman in his life, especially when Edmund goes to stay overnight at Heather's flat.

As the relationship between Heather and Edmund becomes more serious, Ismay worries whether or not she should tell him what she believes about Heather's past and, eventually, records a tape telling him what she thinks happened when Guy drowned. She hides it in a box which formally contained the cassette 'Rainy Season Ragas' and puts it out of sight.

Edmund and Heather's relationship causes another rift; this time between Ismay and Andrew. Edmund sees Andrew on an outing with another woman but chooses to keep this information to himself as he doesn't want to hurt Ismay or Heather. Andrew cannot stand Heather and Edmund being in "our flat". Andrew has a row with Edmund during which Edmund confronts Andrew with his knowledge of Andrew's infidelity and Andrew behaves very aggressively in response. Edmund leaves the flat, never to return and soon Heather joins him, living at his mother's house. Unhappy that Ismay didn't ask them to leave first, Andrew splits up with Ismay. Edmund proposes to Heather and they become engaged and begin seeking a flat of their own.

Marion takes advantage of Irene's dislike of Heather and spends a lot of time with her, hoping to be included in her will. Marion has morphine sulphate in her bathroom cabinet, that she obtained from a previous elderly friend who died, and left her sufficient money to buy a flat and hopes to use it on one of her other elderly "friends". Irene invites Marion for Christmas, and Marion meets Avice, an elderly lady who frets about leaving her rabbits at home alone. Marion is soon rabbit-sitting, cleaning and cooking for Avice regularly.

Fowler, Marion's homeless brother, sometimes visits her flat for a meal, drink or a bed for the night. On one visit he finds the morphine in her bathroom cupboard and substitutes it for cough mixture so she won't notice. Edmund and Heather are married, and after a scene with Irene at the wedding, move out to a rented flat whilst they wait to complete the sale on a flat of their own. Ismay decides to destroy the recording she made for Edmund regarding Guy's death and puts it into her handbag to throw it away somewhere in London.

Ismay is distraught at losing the love of her life, wandering around the places she and Andrew went at all hours of the night and drinking heavily. She even confronts Andrew and his new flame, socialite Eva Simber and then has her bag stolen on the tube; the bag containing the tape she made for Edmund. Heather, hoping that Andrew would return to Ismay without the presence of Eva, begins to contact the young woman regularly, asking her to leave Andrew. Eva refuses to do so, although she speaks to Heather on the phone quite often all the same.

After Avice leaves Marion some money in her will, Marion tries to poison her with her morphine, but discovers Fowler's robbery when Avice says her food tastes like cough mixture. She instead turns her attentions to Irene's neighbour, Barry Fenix, a flirtatious retired 'civil servant' who loves all things relating to India.

Eva Simber goes for her daily run and is murdered. Ismay discovers Heather had been in contact with her and thinks that Heather has killed Eva in order that Andrew would return to her. Ismay sits with Beatrix quite a lot whilst Pamela goes out with Ivan, a man she has met on 'romance walks'. Although he will not spend any money to take her out and she does not much like his character, Pamela fancies him enough to become his lover.

Marion tells Fowler that she is to become engaged and he leaves her an engagement present of a Marc Jacobs handbag he found in a West End bin and its contents, which include a tape, 'Rainy Season Ragas'.

Pamela decides to end things with her lover, but when she does he becomes violent and beats her up, rapes her and kicks her down the stairs of his flat. She is taken to hospital and Edmund and Heather move in with Beatrix to care for her. Ismay comes home from work to discover Andrew inside her flat, he has returned to her. She hides the fact that Edmund and Heather are currently living upstairs with her mother and the two are reconciled.

Marion listens to the tape to see if it is suitable to play to Barry on a romantic evening and discovers what Ismay has said on it. She decides to blackmail Ismay, who is desperate to keep the tape's contents a secret from Andrew, who has decided to move in with her. Marion extorts several hundred pounds from Ismay and becomes engaged to Barry. When Marion boasts that she shall shortly be 'Mrs Barry Fenix', Ismay remembers the name in connection to Guy's death – Barry was the officer who led the investigation all those years ago. She tells Marion to stop the blackmail or she will tell Barry what she has been up to. Marion gives up her blackmail and she and Barry are married shortly after. Fowler blackmails Marion into giving him her flat.

Following a teenager's arrest for the murder of Eva Simber, Ismay confronts Heather and asks her whether she killed Eva and Guy. Heather is shocked that Ismay could think she killed Eva but admits to killing Guy, not to protect Ismay but because he was sexually abusing her, Heather. Heather tells Ismay that Guy was no longer interested in pursuing her because she was 'obviously interested' in him and that Guy wanted someone who didn't want him, so he turned his attentions to Heather. Guy got into the bath that day and asked Heather to join him in the bubbles, saying "the water's lovely". Heather also tells Edmund of the murder she committed as a thirteen-year-old and he is deeply saddened by the information. The two head off for a belated honeymoon.

Pamela is reconciled with a Michael, a former fiancé who left her after Guy's death, and the two plan to move in together and have Beatrix living with them. Ismay and Andrew get engaged and start looking for a shared home, too.

On Boxing Day an earthquake in the Indian Ocean triggers a tsunami in Indonesia, Sri Lanka, India, and Thailand. Fearing for Heather and Edmund, who are honeymooning in Sumatra in Indonesia, Ismay asks Andrew to ring a friend who is a diplomat. There is a news report that four British citizens have been killed in a tsunami, but no names can be released until the next of kin have been informed. The next of kin are Heather's mother and Edmund's mother.

== Reception ==
Janet Maslin of The New York Times called it one of Rendell's "most gleefully energetic efforts" and a "deft, sneaky and complicated book, a novel rich with parallels and shadows." Kim Curtis of the Associated Press called it a "haunting, taut and perfectly woven mystery that can be easily devoured in a single setting", though its "effects aren't necessarily long-lasting, won't change the world or meaningfully alter readers' perceptions of it. Kathy Kerr of the Edmonton Journal opined that Rendell's "pattern of tossing together a richly drawn stew of disparate characters with some common links and the subjecting them to not-too-random mayhem works beautifully in this outing."
