= The Brimstone Wedding =

1996 novel by Barbara Vine

- First edition (UK)
- Author: Barbara Vine
- Language: English
- Genre: Crime / Mystery novel
- Publisher: Viking (UK); Harmony (US)
- Publication date: 28 March 1996
- Publication place: United Kingdom
- Media type: Print/Audiobook
- Pages: 320 (paperback)
- ISBN: 0-14-025280-0
- OCLC: 39328622
- Preceded by: No Night Is Too Long
- Followed by: The Chimney-sweeper's Boy

The Brimstone Wedding is a 1996 mystery novel by British writer Ruth Rendell, written under the name Barbara Vine.

== Plot summary ==
Jenny Warden, a care-assistant in a retirement home, is in a loveless marriage, and has a lover. She befriends Stella Newland, a resident with terminal cancer, and Stella gradually reveals the events of her life, which in some ways parallel Jenny's. A vanished film star and a secret house add to the intrigue until the terrible truth of the brimstone wedding is finally revealed.
