= Talking to Strange Men =

1987 novel by Ruth Rendell

- Author: Ruth Rendell
- Language: English
- Genre: Crime, Mystery novel
- Publisher: Hutchinson (UK); Pantheon Books (US)
- Publication date: 21 May 1987
- Publication place: United Kingdom
- Media type: Print (Hardback & Paperback)
- Pages: 300 pp
- ISBN: 0-09-168080-8
- OCLC: 15551282

Talking to Strange Men is a 1987 novel by British writer Ruth Rendell.

== Plot summary ==
Two plotlines run through this crime novel. The main adult protagonist is John Creevey who stumbles upon a series of hidden coded messages which he thinks must be the work of criminals or spies. John is unhappy and depressed. His wife Jennifer has left him for Peter Mullin, her old fiancé, and he cannot accept that she will not return to him. He is still affected by the murder of his sister 16 years ago and Peter, her fiancé, is equally unhappy. John becomes obsessed by unravelling the codes, spending hours trying to break them.

The coded messages are, however, being left by rival groups of public schoolboys. These boys are emulating the world of the 1980s spy fiction with the home team led by 14-year-old Mungo battling against Moscow Centre, run by boys at a rival school. Mungo is over six feet tall and has inherited the leadership from his older brother. The groups have moles and traitors. One of Mungo's team is Charles Mabledene, another 14-year-old, but Mungo is not sure if he is really on their side and sets out to test him.

Jennifer and Peter come round to John's house in one of their attempts to get him to agree to a quick divorce and Colin, a friend of John's, recognises from when he was a juror. He tells John that Peter pleaded guilty to indecent assault on a male child under the age of thirteen. John wonders how he can use this information to turn Jennifer against Peter and is also worried because a 12-year-old boy has been abducted from where Peter and Jennifer live on an afternoon when Peter was on his own.

John decides to intercept and alter one of the messages and gives instructions for Peter to be investigated. The message is sent to Charles and he interprets this as being the loyalty test he is expecting.

John confronts Jennifer with his information on Peter saying, "You can't love a man who molests little boys", but Jennifer stays loyal to Peter, to help him and to protect other boys. John then tries to cancel his instructions to Charles, but Charles ignores the new message, knows it cannot be from Mungo who is on holiday, and reads it as a trap.

Charles goes to Peter's House and meets him on the pretext of offering to wash his car. He immediately senses that Peter is attracted to him. Charles looks very young for his age and tells Peter he is just twelve years old. He is just over five-foot, has blond hair, an unbroken voice and is quite aware he is very attractive. His father is always telling him not to talk to strange men. Peter suggests a meeting in town. After they sit down, he leans forward to brush ice cream off Charles' cheek yet Charles maintains a cool exterior. On a later trip to the cinema, Peter puts his arm around the boy's shoulder. After the cinema, they go to eat supper in a derelict building, one of the boys' ‘safe houses'. Peter makes advances to Charles, talking about a 'physically loving' friendship he had when he was Charles' age, and puts his hand on his thigh. Charles jumps up and in the subsequent panic, Peter is accidentally killed and Charles escapes, leaving a burning candle which destroys the building.

== Reception ==
Charles Champlin of the Los Angeles Times wrote that Rendell "records the life styles that run south from the middle class with a microscopic accuracy that is saved from being merciless by a touch of humour, and the contemporary England she portrays can be seen and felt." Nancy Pate of the Orlando Sentinel praised the "expert" plotting and the characterisation, calling the novel "first-class entertainment." Carolyn Purden of the Toronto Star called the novel an "interesting exercise but palid in comparison to her portraits of the psychopathic killer."
