= A Judgement in Stone =

1977 novel by Ruth Rendell

- First edition (UK)
- Author: Ruth Rendell
- Language: English
- Genre: Crime, Mystery novel
- Publisher: Hutchinson (UK); Doubleday (US)
- Publication date: 2 May 1977
- Publication place: United Kingdom
- Media type: Print (Hardback & Paperback)
- Pages: 191 pp
- ISBN: 0-09-129070-8
- OCLC: 3606842
- Dewey Decimal: 823/.9/14
- LC Class: PZ4.R4132 Ju PR6068.E63

A Judgement in Stone is a 1977 novel by British writer Ruth Rendell.

== Plot summary ==
Eunice is taken on as a housekeeper by a family of four. She has kept her illiteracy a secret and is obsessed with continuing to keep it so.

Unknown to her new employers, she has already murdered the father for whom she had been caring, and has falsified her references. Her inability to adapt to her place in society is masked by the cunning with which she conceals the truth about herself. Misinterpreting every act of kindness she is offered by her employers, she eventually turns on them, stealing the guns that are normally kept locked away.

With the aid of a fellow social misfit, she murders the entire family. But Eunice's illiteracy prevents her from recognizing and disposing of a written clue that was left behind. Eventually a tape recording of the shooting made by one of the victims is discovered. Eunice is charged with the crime, and is mortified when her illiteracy is revealed to the world during the court proceedings.

== Film, TV or theatrical adaptations ==
The novel was adapted twice for film.

A 1986 British-Canadian coproduction, known as either A Judgement in Stone or The Housekeeper in different markets, starred Rita Tushingham as the illiterate maid and was directed by Ousama Rawi. It premiered at the 1986 Cannes Film Festival, and was later screened at the 1986 Toronto International Film Festival.

The French film La Cérémonie (1995) was directed by Claude Chabrol and starred Sandrine Bonnaire as the maid, with Isabelle Huppert as the friend. Bonnaire and Huppert shared the Volpi Cup for Best Actress at the 52nd Venice International Film Festival for their performances.

In June 1992 it was also performed as a musical at the Lyric Hammersmith in London.

== Release details ==
- 1997, UK, Hutchinson (ISBN 0-09-129070-8), Pub date 2 May 1977, hardback (First edition)
