= The Girl Next Door (Rendell novel) =

2014 novel by Ruth Rendell

- First edition (publ. Hutchinson)
- Author: Ruth Rendell
- Publisher: Scribner
- Publication date: 4 November 2014
- ISBN: 978-1-4767-8432-8

The Girl Next Door is a 2014 novel by British crime author Ruth Rendell. It was the last of her novels published in her lifetime.

== Plot ==
During World War II, a group of children in Loughton, Essex, United Kingdom, which is where Rendell herself grew up, play in tunnels (in reality, the foundations of an uncompleted house) they discovered under a hill. In the present day they are reunited after the discovery of two hands in a tin box when the tunnels are dug up for construction work. The novel deals frankly with changes and interrelationships of the characters and social changes generally, over seven decades.

== Critical reception ==
In a review in The Observer, it was noted that instead of focusing on the crime, the novel dealt with the lives of the now elderly people in the present.

In Marilyn Stasio's review for The New York Times, the novel's effective use of a split time frame was noted.
