= The Fallen Curtain =

1976 short story collection by Ruth Rendell

- First edition (UK)
- Author: Ruth Rendell
- Language: English
- Genre: Crime, mystery
- Publisher: Hutchinson (UK); The Crime Club (US)
- Publication date: 17 October 1976
- Publication place: United Kingdom
- Media type: Print (hardback and paperback)
- Pages: 192
- ISBN: 978-0375704925

The Fallen Curtain is a collection of 11 short stories by British writer Ruth Rendell. The title story won the MWA Edgar Award for Best Short Story of the Year in 1975. The book was first published in the UK in 1976 by Hutchinson. All stories – with the exception of People Don’t Do Such Things, The Vinegar Mother and Divided We Stand – were first published in Ellery Queen's Mystery Magazine in the early to mid-1970s.

== Contents ==
- The Fallen Curtain
- People Don’t Do Such Things
- A Bad Heart (in the magazine publication under the title Trapped)
- You Can’t Be Too Careful
- The Double (in the magazine publication under the title Meeting in the Park)
- The Venus Fly Trap (in the magazine publication under the title Venus’s Flytrap)
- The Clinging Woman (in some publications under the title His Worst Enemy)
- The Vinegar Mother
- The Fall of a Coin
- Almost Human
- Divided We Stand
