= A Fatal Inversion =

1987 novel by Barbara Vine (Ruth Rendell)

- First edition (UK)
- Author: Barbara Vine (Ruth Rendell)
- Language: English
- Genre: Crime / Mystery novel
- Publisher: Viking (UK); Bantam (US)
- Publication date: March 1987
- Publication place: United Kingdom
- Media type: Print (Hardcover)
- Pages: 336 pp
- ISBN: 0-670-80977-2
- OCLC: 23838424
- Preceded by: A Dark-Adapted Eye
- Followed by: The House of Stairs

A Fatal Inversion is a 1987 novel by Ruth Rendell, written under the pseudonym Barbara Vine. The novel won the Crime Writers' Association Gold Dagger in that year and, in 1987, was also shortlisted for the Dagger of Daggers, a special award to select the best Gold Dagger winner of the award's 50-year history.

== Plot summary ==
In the process of burying a dog in the animal cemetery of Wyvis Hall, a Suffolk country house, the owner unearths the skeletons of a dead woman and baby. The horrific discovery challenges the buried memories and guilt of a small group of young people who, 10 years earlier, spent the broiling summer of 1976 in a self-indulgently irresponsible idyll at Wyvis Hall, unexpectedly inherited by one of their number. Slowly the facts emerge and the past catches up with them. But which woman is dead? And whose child?

== Adaptations ==
The BBC adapted the novel for Radio 4 in 1991, and in three episodes for television in 1992 as the first novel to be adapted for The Barbara Vine Mysteries. The series starred Jeremy Northam and Douglas Hodge.
