= Master of the Moor =

1982 novel by Ruth Rendell

- Author: Ruth Rendell
- Language: English
- Genre: Crime, Mystery novel
- Publisher: Hutchinson (UK); Pantheon Books (US)
- Publication date: April 5, 1982
- Publication place: United Kingdom
- Media type: Print (Hardback & Paperback)
- Pages: 192 pp
- ISBN: 0-09-146930-9
- OCLC: 8735473

Master of the Moor (1982) is a crime novel by Ruth Rendell.

== Synopsis ==
Columnist Stephen Walby, known as the Voice of Vangmoor, often goes on long walks through the countryside that lies outside his window. However, events take on a sinister turn when he stumbles across the body of a young woman, whose face has been badly disfigured and her hair shaven. After another corpse surfaces he finds himself under suspicion from the local police, and when he then goes on to discover that his wife has been having an affair, tragedy ensues...

== Reception ==
Paul Bailey of the Evening Standard wrote that the novel features "plenty of cunningly engineered twists" and praised the characterisation. Jack Holmes of the Herald-Sun wrote that Rendell "spines an enthralling tale" and that "as intriguing as the murder plot is, it is secondary to the psychological plot she weaves so intricately with it." Charles Champlin of the Los Angeles Times called the novel a "good, cold unpleasant study" and "remarkably economical and almost too convincing."
