= End in Tears =

2005 novel by Ruth Rendell

- First edition (UK)
- Author: Ruth Rendell
- Language: English
- Series: Inspector Wexford # 20
- Genre: Crime/mystery novel
- Publisher: Hutchinson (UK); Crown (US)
- Publication date: 20 Oct 2005
- Publication place: United Kingdom
- Media type: Print (hardback & paperback)
- Pages: 366 pp
- ISBN: 0-09-179641-5
- OCLC: 62080784
- Preceded by: The Babes in the Wood
- Followed by: Not in the Flesh

End in Tears (2005) is a novel by English crime writer Ruth Rendell, the twentieth in her acclaimed Inspector Wexford series.

== Synopsis ==
When a lump of concrete is thrown from a bridge and into passing traffic one dark night, the wrong motorist dies. The killer soon rectifies his mistake, however, and Inspector Wexford finds himself under attack from the local press because of his 'old-fashioned' policing methods. Meanwhile, the difficult relationship he shares with his daughter Sylvia takes on new dimensions, as the case makes him ponder the terrible possibility of losing a child.

== Reception ==
The novel was very well received by critics, and in 2007 received a nomination for the Theakston's Old Peculier Crime Novel of the Year Award.
