= The Monster in the Box =

2009 novel by Ruth Rendell

- first edition (UK)
- Author: Ruth Rendell
- Language: English
- Series: Inspector Wexford # 22
- Genre: Crime/Mystery novel
- Publisher: Hutchinson (UK); Scribner (US); Doubleday Canada (Canada)
- Publication date: 2009
- Publication place: United Kingdom
- Media type: Print (Hardback & Paperback)
- Pages: 279 pp
- ISBN: 978-0-091-93149-0
- Preceded by: Not in the Flesh
- Followed by: The Vault

The Monster in the Box is a novel by British crime-writer Ruth Rendell, published in 2009. The novel is the 22nd in the Inspector Wexford series.

== Plot summary ==
Wexford has long suspected Eric Targo of being a serial killer. Decades later, he finally admits this to DI Mike Burden, his longtime colleague and friend. In an apparently unrelated matter, DS Hannah Goldsmith and Burden's second wife Jenny both approach Wexford with concerns about Tamima, one of Jenny Burden's students.

As a young detective constable he investigated the murder of Elsie Carroll. Wexford suspects that while her husband purported to be at a whist club, he was actually with his mistress when his wife was killed. George Carroll was acquitted of his wife's murder on a technicality, but was still shunned by Kingsmarkham residents; Wexford believes him innocent. In the weeks of and following the investigation into Elsie Carroll's death, Targo, a scarf covering his prominent birthmark, walks his dog past the young Wexford's rooming house to taunt him, or so it appears to Wexford.

By the 1970s Targo has become a prosperous businessman, several times married and divorced, living in the north of England. Targo reappears in Kingsmarkam. Wexford suspects that Targo has murdered the autistic son of a Myringham widow who wishes her son dead so she can marry her longtime partner.

In the book's present Targo reappears again, still with his dogs, without the naevus, but with a private menagerie.
