= Live Flesh =

1986 novel by Ruth Rendell

- First edition
- Author: Ruth Rendell
- Language: English
- Genre: Crime, Mystery novel
- Publisher: Hutchinson
- Publication date: 27 February 1986
- Publication place: United Kingdom
- Media type: Print (Hardback & Paperback)
- Pages: 272 pp (first edition, hardback)
- ISBN: 0-09-163680-9 (first edition, hardback)
- OCLC: 13485433

Live Flesh is a 1986 psychological thriller by British author Ruth Rendell. It won the Crime Writers' Association Gold Dagger for best crime novel of the year. It was the inspiration for a 1997 film of the same name by Pedro Almodóvar. Almodovar's treatment of the theme is very different from the original novel, making significant changes to the characters and plot.

== Plot summary ==
The novel's protagonist is Victor Jenner, sent to prison for shooting and crippling a police officer after an attempted rape. At his trial and afterwards he claims that his actions were unintentional and somehow provoked by his victim. But there may have been other reasons for his attack of which even he was unaware. Ten years later, Jenner is released from prison and has to find himself a new life, with the reduced resources produced by ten years' incarceration and the handicap of a significant criminal record. He discovers that it is all too easy to slip back into the old one.
