= A Dark-Adapted Eye =

1986 novel by Ruth Rendell

A Dark-adapted Eye
- First edition (UK)
- Author: Barbara Vine (Ruth Rendell)
- Language: English
- Genre: Crime / mystery novel / psychological thriller
- Published: 1986 (Viking/UK) (Bantam/US)
- Publication place: United Kingdom
- Media type: Print/audiobook
- Pages: 304 (paperback)
- ISBN: 0-14-008636-6
- OCLC: 60261763
- Followed by: A Fatal Inversion

A Dark-Adapted Eye (1986) is a psychological thriller novel by Ruth Rendell, written under the pen name Barbara Vine. The novel won the American Edgar Award. It was adapted as a television film of the same name in 1994 by the BBC.

== Plot ==
Largely set during World War II, the story is told by Faith Severn, who at the prompting of a true-crime writer recounts her memories of her aunt, the prim, fastidious, and snobbish Vera Hillyard. Vera's life is initially centred on her beautiful younger sister, Eden, even to the exclusion of her own son, Francis, with whom she has a poor relationship. Later, Vera brings up a second son, Jamie, born during the war and presumably fathered by Vera's soldier husband, though the timing of his birth raises questions. Vera becomes intensely devoted to Jamie, while Eden marries the scion of a wealthy family.

When Eden is unable to have children with her husband, she begins to demand custody of Jamie, who she claims is being poorly raised by Vera. To the bewilderment and shock of the rest of the family, the custody battle escalates to violent levels, leading to tragedy and a series of disturbing revelations.

== Adaptation ==
A Dark-Adapted Eye was dramatised (with the storyline significantly altered) by the BBC in 1994 as part of The Barbara Vine Mysteries. It starred Celia Imrie as Vera, Sophie Ward as Eden, and Helena Bonham-Carter as Faith.

== A note on the title ==
A dark-adapted eye is one that has adjusted to darkness so that it is able to discern objects. In the context of the novel, the title refers to Faith's ability, after many years, to examine and analyse her family's history and its tragedy.

The book includes themes that were common in Rendell's work, including illegitimate births and miscarriages. She refused to reveal details of her personal life, but admitted that one of the incidents in the book was based on a story she had heard in childhood.
