= The Birthday Present (novel) =

2008 novel by Ruth Rendell

- Author: Barbara Vine (Ruth Rendell)
- Language: English
- Genre: Crime/Mystery novel
- Publisher: Viking (UK); Crown (US)
- Publication date: 6 June 2002
- Publication place: United Kingdom
- Media type: Print/Audiobook
- Pages: 400 pp (Hardback)
- ISBN: 0-670-91274-3
- OCLC: 59395413
- Preceded by: Portobello
- Followed by: The Monster in the Box

The Birthday Present (2008) is a novel by British writer Ruth Rendell, written under her pseudonym Barbara Vine. It was her first novel under this name in three years.

== Plot summary ==
Robert, a city accountant narrates the story, with excerpts from one Jane Atherton's diary. He is married to Iris Tesham. Iris' brother Ivor is an up-and-coming Tory MP, who is having an affair with Hebe Furnal. Hebe uses Jane Atherton as her alibi for her trysts. Ivor Tesham arranges a mock abduction of Hebe as a birthday present for her, but it goes horribly wrong.

== Reception ==
Chloe Schama of National Public Radio wrote that the novel "leans heavily on psychology, but it still has the feeling of a tightly constructed thriller, rather than an exercise in therapeutic introspection, with descriptions of the London landscape and political climate that are particularly exacting." Caroline Moore of The Daily Telegraph called the character of Jane a "strong creation, which transforms this well-constructed but, at first, deliberately uninvolving novel." Carrie O'Grady of The Guardian stated: "There are plenty of dark hints and false leads, but the twist in the tale leaves most of the loose ends hanging. What's more, the suspense worked up so potently in earlier Vine novels is not in evidence."
