= The Face of Trespass =

1974 novel by Ruth Rendell

- First edition cover (UK)
- Author: Ruth Rendell
- Language: English
- Genre: Crime/Mystery novel
- Publisher: Hutchinson (UK); The Crime Club (US)
- Publication date: 5 March 1974
- Publication place: United Kingdom
- Media type: Print (Hardcover)
- Pages: 192 pp
- ISBN: 0-09-117680-8
- OCLC: 948644
- Dewey Decimal: 823/.9/14
- LC Class: PZ4.R4132 Fac3 PR6068.E63

The Face of Trespass is a psychological thriller novel by British writer Ruth Rendell, first published in 1974. The novel, largely told in flashbacks, follows Graham "Gray" Lanceton, a writer involved with a woman named Drusilla Browne who asks him to kill her wealthy husband. Lanceton becomes entangled in an intense, destructive affair with Browne, whom he sees as a "succubus."

An Affair in Mind, a movie adaptation of the novel by the BBC starring Stephen Dillane and Amanda Donohoe, was released in 1988.
