= The Rottweiler =

2003 novel by Ruth Rendell

- First edition (UK)
- Author: Ruth Rendell
- Language: English
- Genre: Crime novel
- Publisher: Hutchinson (UK); Crown (US); Doubleday Canada (Canada)
- Publication date: 2 October 2003
- Publication place: United Kingdom
- Media type: Print (Hardback & Paperback)
- Pages: 356 pp
- ISBN: 0-09-179946-5
- OCLC: 52486606
- Dewey Decimal: 823/.914 22
- LC Class: PR6068.E63 R67 2003b

The Rottweiler (2003) is a psychological thriller novel by English crime writer Ruth Rendell.
