= Not in the Flesh =

Novel by Ruth Rendell

- Author: Ruth Rendell
- Language: English
- Series: Inspector Wexford # 21
- Genre: Crime/Mystery novel
- Publisher: Hutchinson (UK); Crown (US)
- Publication date: 2007
- Publication place: United Kingdom
- Media type: Print (Hardback & Paperback)
- Pages: 372 pp
- ISBN: 0-09-192059-0
- OCLC: 123796945
- Preceded by: End in Tears
- Followed by: The Monster in the Box

Not in the Flesh is 2007 novel by British crime-writer Ruth Rendell. The novel is the 21st entry in the Inspector Wexford series.

== Reception ==
Ann Hellmuth of the South Florida Sun Suntinel wrote that Rendell "knows what it takes to deliver the inevitable knock-out punch." Michael Sims of the Los Angeles Times wrote that while the novel "may not be transcendant or match Rendell's best", it is "written in her usual elegant style, it is a gratifying visit with an enormously appealing character." Robert Croan of the Pittsburgh Post-Gazette called the novel "reasonably good", though "not one of the author's very best."
