= The Thief (novella) =

2006 novella by Ruth Rendell

- First edition
- Author: Ruth Rendell
- Language: English
- Genre: Crime, Mystery novel or novella
- Publisher: Arrow Books
- Publication date: 2006
- Publication place: United Kingdom
- Media type: Print (Paperback & Hardback)
- Pages: 96 pp
- ISBN: 0-09-949788-3
- OCLC: 62474654

The Thief is a 2006 novella by British author Ruth Rendell, published in the Quick Reads series. As an entry in said series, it is of novella length.
