= Asta's Book =

1993 novel by Barbara Vine

- First edition (UK)
- Author: Barbara Vine (Ruth Rendell)
- Language: English
- Genre: Crime / Mystery novel
- Publisher: Viking (UK); Harmony (US)
- Publication date: March 25, 1993
- Publication place: United Kingdom
- Media type: Print (Hardback & Paperback) & Audiobook
- Pages: 448 (paperback)
- ISBN: 0-14-017661-6
- OCLC: 30735495
- Preceded by: King Solomon's Carpet
- Followed by: No Night Is Too Long

Asta's Book is a 1993 novel by British writer Ruth Rendell, written under the name Barbara Vine. It was published in the USA under the title Anna's Book.

== Plot ==
The story of Asta, a Danish immigrant in London in 1905, is told mainly in flashback through the discovery of her diary by her daughter.
