= King Solomon's Carpet =

1991 novel by Barbara Vine

- First edition (UK)
- Author: Barbara Vine (Ruth Rendell)
- Language: English
- Genre: Crime / Mystery novel
- Publisher: Viking (UK); Harmony (US)
- Publication date: 1 August 1991
- Publication place: United Kingdom
- Media type: Print/Audiobook
- Pages: 368 (paperback)
- ISBN: 0-14-015691-7
- OCLC: 27640684
- Preceded by: Gallowglass
- Followed by: Asta's Book

King Solomon's Carpet (1991) is a novel by Barbara Vine, pseudonym of Ruth Rendell. It is about the London Underground and the people frequenting it. Vine's novel is inhabited by ordinary passengers, tube aficionados, pickpockets, buskers, vigilantes, and children who go "sledging" on the roofs of train carriages as an initiation rite. The title of the book refers to the legend of King Solomon's magic carpet of green silk which, as it could fly and brought everyone to their destination, is likened to the underground. King Solomon's Carpet is one of the few novels set in London which should be read with the help of a tube map. It won the CWA Gold Dagger for best crime novel of the year in 1991.

== Plot summary ==
Jarvis Stringer is a student of the London Tube and its history and of underground trains worldwide. In order to finance his hobby and be able to travel to distant lands to inspect the underground systems in other parts of the world, he lets rooms in an old disused school building he has inherited which is close to the London Underground tracks in West Hampstead. There gather a group of misfits and weirdos, including a squatter, whose dreams of the good life have time and again been shattered as they are constantly victimised by society. There is 24-year-old Alice, an aspiring musician who leaves her husband and new-born baby only to end up busking in various stations in central London. There is Tom, who, after an accident, drops out of music school and is reduced to busking as well but who dreams of one day starting his own business. There is unemployed Tina, whose promiscuity landed her with two children whom she does not take care of in the way her mother thinks she ought to. There is Jed, who volunteers as a vigilante and who, disappointed by humans, lavishes all his love on the hawk he has acquired and which he keeps in the house. And there is Axel, an enigmatic man who regularly travels on the tube in the company of a man disguised as a bear and who is planning something illegal.

Cecilia and Daphne, two old ladies living in the neighbourhood, serve as a foil to this ill-assorted group. It is Cecilia in particular who does not understand how young people such as her daughter Tina can be utterly devoid of morals. She is shocked to learn that her 10-year-old grandson enjoys riding on the roof of carriages as they go through deep-level tunnels. While travelling on the tube herself, her handbag containing her credit cards is stolen, and she suffers a stroke in one of the packed carriages.

The novel is interspersed with extracts from Jarvis Stringer's (fictional) book on the London Underground.
