= Vanity Dies Hard =

1966 novel by Ruth Rendell

- First edition
- Author: Ruth Rendell
- Language: English
- Genre: Crime/Mystery novel
- Publisher: John Long Ltd
- Publication date: 1966
- Publication place: United Kingdom
- Media type: Print (Hardback & Paperback)

Vanity Dies Hard is a novel by British writer Ruth Rendell, published in 1966 by John Long Ltd in the UK and in the same year as In Sickness and in Health by Doubleday in the US. It reverted back to its original UK title for its initial US paperback publication and has remained so since. In a later interview, the author said that it was at the very bottom of the list of "my worst books". In 1995 the novel was adapted for the ITV series of The Ruth Rendell Mysteries.

== Synopsis ==
Ruth Rendell has said that her non-series novels are meant to be “stories of psychological suspense”. In this case, wealthy Alice Whittaker has married the much younger teacher Andrew Fielding at the age of 37 and has arranged for him to be given a job in the family firm. When she goes to visit her more glamorous friend Nesta Drage in the nearby town to which she has moved, Alice discovers that she has given a false address. Although the local postman has a forwarding address, all that Alice can learn in the run-down area of Paddington that she visits is that a "Mr Drage" comes to pick up Nesta's mail, but that Nesta has never lived there.

Alice is now hampered in her search by illness. Her brother Hugo mentions that Nesta had once made a pass at him and Alice begins to suspect that her own father is paying hush money to Nesta and that at the same time she is being poisoned. Her husband Andrew remains loving but has become remote and preoccupied. As her illness worsens and Alice grows more and more fearful, Harry Blunden, the doctor who has always loved her, turns reticent and withdrawn.

The eventual solution to her suspense is two-fold. Alice's symptoms are only those of pregnancy. Nesta had had a degenerative disease which vanity had made her try to hide from those who knew her. In the end, Harry had persuaded her to go to a clinic secretly until she was cured.
