= La Cérémonie =

1995 French psychological thriller film by Claude Chabrol

- Film poster
- Directed by: Claude Chabrol
- Written by: Claude Chabrol; Caroline Eliacheff
- Based on: A Judgement in Stone by Ruth Rendell
- Produced by: Marin Karmitz
- Starring: Isabelle Huppert; Sandrine Bonnaire; Jacqueline Bisset; Jean-Pierre Cassel; Virginie Ledoyen; Valentin Merlet; Serge Rousseau
- Cinematography: Bernard Zitzermann
- Edited by: Monique Fardoulis
- Music by: Matthieu Chabrol
- Release date: 30 August 1995 (France)
- Running time: 112 minutes
- Countries: France; Germany
- Language: French
- Box office: $10,882,920

La Cérémonie (English: lit. The Ceremony also known as A Judgment in Stone) is a 1995 French psychological thriller film written and directed by Claude Chabrol. Starring Isabelle Huppert and Sandrine Bonnaire and adapted from the 1977 novel A Judgement in Stone by British writer Ruth Rendell. The story follows Sophie (Bonnaire), a maid hired to work for the rich Lelièvre family in the French countryside. She befriends Jeanne (Huppert), the local postmistress, but their friendship soon starts taking an increasingly dark turn.

The film echoes the true case of Christine and Léa Papin, two French maids who brutally murdered their employer's wife and daughter in 1933, as well as the 1947 play they inspired, The Maids by Jean Genet.

The film received widespread critical acclaim with praise for its layered screenplay and Chabrol's directing, as well as Bonnaire and Huppert's performances, chemistry and dynamic. Chabrol presents an ambiguous view of culture and class conflict in this film, which he amusingly called "the last Marxist film."

== Plot ==
Sophie, an illiterate maid, is hired by Catherine Lelièvre to work for her family, who live in a manor house in the Brittany countryside. Catherine lives there with her husband, Georges, and their two children from previous marriages: Catherine's son Gilles and Georges' daughter Mélinda. Mélinda is a university student and spends the weekends at the family home, occasionally visited by her boyfriend Jérémie. Sophie is hired to alleviate the load of household chores for Catherine, who is busy with her art gallery.

On her way to the Lelièvre manor, Sophie meets Jeanne, the postmistress in Saint-Coulomb. Jeanne is ostracised for her provocative behaviour, especially towards the Lelièvres, whose mail she vandalises. She was also the prime suspect in the death of her four-year-old daughter, but she was later acquitted.

Sophie and Jeanne become close after Jeanne helps Sophie order groceries and visits the Lelièvre manor. During Mélinda's birthday celebration, Sophie sneaks out to have lunch with Jeanne and to join her for charity work at a church. Over the meal, Sophie questions Jeanne about her daughter's death. Jeanne pulls out a newspaper describing a suspicious house fire that killed Sophie's father and asks if she was the culprit. Sophie laughs it off, saying that nothing was ever proved.

Sophie has been hiding her illiteracy from the Lelièvres, who assume her avoidance of driving, reading and using the dishwasher is due to poor eyesight. Mélinda becomes pregnant by Jérémie and tells him over the phone. After the call, she tries to spend time with Sophie by suggesting they read a magazine together. Mélinda puts on Sophie's fake glasses and realises that Sophie has been lying about her eyesight and is illiterate. Sophie tries to blackmail Mélinda into keeping the illiteracy a secret, threatening to tell the Lelièvres about the pregnancy, which she had heard while listening in on Mélinda's phone call. However, Mélinda soon confesses everything to her family, including Sophie's blackmail. Georges then dismisses Sophie and asks her to leave within a week.

After a church charity drive at which the priest reprimands Jeanne for her behaviour and bars her from future drives, the two women arrive at the Lelièvres' manor to pack up Sophie's things. While looking around, Jeanne finds Georges' hunting shotguns, and they set about destroying the family's furniture and clothes while the Lelièvres, unaware, watch and record a broadcast of Don Giovanni in their sitting room. Eventually, the family hears noises and Georges goes to the kitchen to investigate. Finding the two women armed with shotguns, he threatens to call the police on them and Sophie shoots him in the neck, killing him. Sophie and Jeanne then go over to the sitting room where they kill the rest of the family.

Sophie stays behind to get rid of evidence, while Jeanne leaves with the Lelièvres' portable stereo, which, unbeknownst to them, was still recording. Jeanne is killed when her car stalls on the road and is struck by a car driven by the priest who reprimanded her earlier. A policeman finds the portable stereo in the wreck and plays the recording. Sophie, having cleaned the manor, walks past the police and ambulance crews unnoticed.

== Cast ==
- Isabelle Huppert as Jeanne Marchal
- Sandrine Bonnaire as Sophie Bonhomme
- Jacqueline Bisset as Catherine Lelièvre
- Jean-Pierre Cassel as Georges Lelièvre
- Virginie Ledoyen as Mélinda Lelièvre
- Valentin Merlet as Gilles Lelièvre
- Julien Rochefort as Jérémie
- Dominique Frot as Madame Lantier
- Jean-François Perrier as Priest

== Production ==
Principal photography began on 12 January 1995 and completed on 4 March 1995.

== Reception ==
Rotten Tomatoes reports 93% approval for La Cérémonie, with 26 of 28 reviews positive. On 17 April 2012, Roger Ebert added La Cérémonie to his list of "Great Movies". The Guardian included La Cérémonie at #16 in its "25 Best Crime Films of All Time". Craig Williams on the BFI website calls it "perhaps Chabrol's greatest achievement", and "the consummate example of Chabrol's genius – a ruthlessly exacting vision of class indebted to both the pulp aesthetic... and French literary tradition." The Criterion Collection called La Cérémonie "a must-see late-career triumph [...] [that] exemplifies the New Wave auteur's mastery of suspense and twisted psychodrama."

In an interview, South Korean director Bong Joon Ho said La Cérémonie was one of the main inspirations for his Oscar-winning 2019 film, Parasite.

== Awards and nominations ==
- César Awards (France)
  - Won: Best Actress – Leading Role (Isabelle Huppert)
  - Nominated: Best Actor – Supporting Role (Jean-Pierre Cassel)
  - Nominated: Best Actress – Leading Role (Sandrine Bonnaire)
  - Nominated: Best Actress – Supporting Role (Jacqueline Bisset)
  - Nominated: Best Director (Claude Chabrol)
  - Nominated: Best Film
  - Nominated: Best Original Screenplay or Adaptation (Claude Chabrol and Caroline Eliacheff)
- Los Angeles Film Critics (USA)
  - Won: Best Foreign Language Film (Claude Chabrol)
- National Society of Film Critics (USA)
  - Won: Best Foreign Language Film
- Satellite Awards (USA)
  - Nominated: Best Motion Picture – Foreign Language
- Toronto International Film Festival (Canada)
  - Won: Metro Media Award (Claude Chabrol)
- Venice Film Festival (Italy)
  - Won: Volpi Cup – Best Actress (Sandrine Bonnaire and Isabelle Huppert)
  - Nominated: Golden Lion (Claude Chabrol)

== See also ==
- Isabelle Huppert on screen and stage
