= Heartstones =

1987 novella by Ruth Rendell

- First edition (UK)
- Author: Ruth Rendell
- Language: English
- Genre: Crime/Mystery novel
- Publisher: Hutchinson (UK); Harper & Row (US)
- Publication date: 16 April 1987
- Publication place: United Kingdom
- Media type: Print (Paperback)
- Pages: 80 pp
- ISBN: 0-06-015757-7
- OCLC: 15519675
- Dewey Decimal: 823/.914 19
- LC Class: PR6068.E63 H4 1987

Heartstones is a novella by British author Ruth Rendell, published in 1987. It was also published by Longman in a special educational edition in 1990.
