= The Saint Zita Society =

2012 novel by Ruth Rendell

First edition (publ. Hutchinson)

The Saint Zita Society is the 62nd novel by British crime-writer Ruth Rendell, a standalone novel. It is not part of her popular Inspector Wexford series.

== Critical reception ==
The Saint Zita Society was very well received by critics. Laura Wilson of The Guardian praised the book as a "superbly executed ensemble piece" in which "all the characters are kept in play without ever relinquishing the necessary suspense for a fascinating murder mystery." Kirkus Reviews commented in a positive review: "Rendell has been returning to the stripped-down dyspepsia of her earliest work, adding freak-show sociology to her velvet nightmares. Instead of exhausting the possibilities of her collection of plausible misfits, this group portrait leaves you longing for more."

The Independent's Jane Jakeman also praised the book, writing: "The novel's plot forms a complex web in which power sways back and forth between employer and employed, where every coming or going has an observer, and it's not long before we anticipate at least two deaths on the way ... this [book] is a despairing look at the underbelly of London, but it has the ring of truth." Writing for The Washington Times, Muriel Dobbin pointed out that the book was "less of a mystery than a social satire about rather ordinary people" and added: "All the doings of these busy characters are wrapped up in the book’s startling but satisfying ending ... Ms. Rendell, an expert craftsman, has delivered the goods again."
