= The Killing Doll =

1984 novel by Ruth Rendell

- Author: Ruth Rendell
- Language: English
- Genre: Crime, Mystery
- Publisher: Hutchinson (UK); Pantheon Books (US)
- Publication date: 5 March 1984
- Publication place: United Kingdom
- Media type: Print (Hardback & Paperback)
- Pages: 237 pp
- ISBN: 0-09-155480-2
- OCLC: 10700508
- Dewey Decimal: 823/.914 19
- LC Class: PR6068.E63 K5 1984c

The Killing Doll is a novel by British writer Ruth Rendell, published in 1984.

== Synopsis ==
Pup Yearman, a 16-year-old who lives in a rundown area of London, experiments with magic. Dolly, Pup's older sister, does more than just dabble in magic. Dolly is deformed due to a facial birthmark, and her fixation with Pup's magic takes her on a perilous downhill trajectory into uncertainty, madness, and maybe murder. In the meantime, a young Irishman sharpens a set of butcher knives in a run-down boardinghouse nearby.

== Reception ==
Charles Champlin of the Los Angeles Times called the novel a "stunning piece of work, darkly horrific but also with common sense, with a peculiar and bizarre poetic justice prevailing at the most dramatic, unpredictable ending I can lately remember." Paul Bailey of the Evening Standard called the novel "excellent" and praised the dialogue. Seth Williamson of The Roanoke Times wrote that the novel "has a satisfying unexpected ending, though it's not quite as terrifying as some earlier Rendells one could name."
