= The Fever Tree =

1982 book by Ruth Rendell

- First edition (UK)
- Author: Ruth Rendell
- Language: English
- Genre: Crime, Mystery
- Publisher: Hutchinson (UK); Pantheon Books (US)
- Publication date: 27 September 1982
- Publication place: United Kingdom
- Media type: Print (hardback & paperback)
- Pages: 191 PP
- ISBN: 0-09-149730-2
- OCLC: 59082741

The Fever Tree is a collection of short stories by British author Ruth Rendell. It was first published in 1982.

== Contents ==
The collection contains 10 short-stories and one novella.

1. The Fever Tree
2. The Dreadful Day of Judgement
3. A Glowing Future
4. An Outside Interest
5. A Case of Coincidence
6. Thornapple (novella)
7. May and June
8. A Needle for the Devil
9. Front Seat
10. Paintbox Place
11. The Wrong Category
