= To Fear a Painted Devil =

1965 novel by Ruth Rendell

- First edition (UK)
- Author: Ruth Rendell
- Language: English
- Genre: Crime/Mystery novel
- Publisher: John Long Ltd (UK); Doubleday (US)
- Publication date: 1965
- Publication place: United Kingdom
- Media type: Print (Hardback & Paperback)

To Fear a Painted Devil is a novel by British writer Ruth Rendell published in 1965 by John Long Ltd in the UK and Doubleday in the US. Her second book, it is a stand-alone crime thriller in which "there is less reliance on suspense and the main focus is on the motivation of the murderer". There is also a social preoccupation, with interacting characters drawn from many strata of society.

The title of the novel alludes to a passage from Macbeth, where Lady Macbeth chides her husband, who has just killed the king: "Tis the eye of childhood / That fears a painted devil". In terms of Rendell's plot, it refers to Patrick Selby's association of seeing the picture of the beheaded John the Baptist with the time he suffered a near-fatal bee sting, as related in the prologue.

== Setting ==
Henry Glide had bought the grounds of the former Linchester Manor for development. At first he built three modest chalet-style bungalows, now divided by a band of trees from the more up-market houses lived in by commuting Nottingham businessmen and built around a central green with a pond. At the edge of the development is a strip of woodland, beyond which are the converted 18th century almshouses in which lives Crispin Marvell, son of the former estate owner, who spends his time raising bees and trying to finish writing a history of the estate.

The most prosperous property is a modernistic house called The Hallows, where Patrick Selby lives with his wife (and first cousin), the empty-headed Tamsin. Patrick has earned the dislike of most of the people at Linchester. To begin with, there is Tamsin herself, over whom he domineers and whose affair with one resident he has broken up, although at the same time conducting an affair himself with another. But Tamsin dare not leave Patrick for fear of losing her family legacy. Marvell, the former owner, is aggrieved that Patrick has disregarded the tenancy agreement that he would not fell the trees on his ground. Another family, the Gavestons, has been offended by Patrick’s interference in the career choices of their children, diverting them from the upwardly mobile preferences of their parents. Meanwhile, Denholm Smith-King, father to five children, is apprehensive that Patrick may be aiming to take over his business. In fact the only person sympathetic to Patrick is Freda Carnaby, who sees in him an escape from sharing a household with her recently widowed brother Edward and his young daughter.

Most of the Linchester residents are invited to Tamsin's 27th birthday party, but the rather uneasy evening is cut short when Patrick is stung while trying to dislodge a wasps' nest. Patrick is put to bed with a sedative by the local GP, Max Greenleaf. The following day he is discovered dead, which Greenleaf finds puzzling until it emerges that Patrick died of heart failure and that he had had rheumatic fever when he was young. Then gossip among the neighbours is fanned by Nancy, the dissatisfied wife of twice-divorced Oliver Gage, and Dr Greenleaf is forced to reconsider. Patrick had not been his regular patient and so he had stood apart from the coroner's investigation.

At first suspicion seems to fall on Tamsin, who had gone away following Patrick's death and now returns, brown, rested and cheerful, to put The Hallows up for sale. It is difficult to think how Patrick could have been murdered, however, until Greenleaf remembers that, although Patrick had had four wasp stings when put to bed, there had been an additional swelling on his corpse: a bee sting to which, it turns out, Patrick is allergic. As a result, he had died of anaphylactic shock. Greenleaf, who has been discussing the case with his friend Crispin Marvell, now confronts the bee-keeping Marvell with his solution, a crime to which Marvell confesses. In need of money, he had brought in the bee that killed Patrick overnight and had counted on marrying Tamsin for her income. Faced with prosecution, he asks to take a bath first and slits his veins while there.
