= A Sight for Sore Eyes (novel) =

1998 novel by Ruth Rendell

- Author: Ruth Rendell
- Language: English
- Genre: Crime / Mystery novel
- Publisher: Hutchinson (UK); Crown (US); Doubleday Canada (Canada)
- Publication date: September, 1998
- Publication place: United Kingdom
- Media type: Print (Hardcover, Paperback)
- ISBN: 0-09-180101-X
- OCLC: 60175720

A Sight For Sore Eyes is a psychological thriller by British crime-writer Ruth Rendell.

== Synopsis ==
A Sight for Sore Eyes tells three stories of very different people, whose lives converge with horrifying consequences.

Teddy is raised by a neglectful family with little concern for his welfare or emotional development, so that he grows into a reclusive young man without compassion or empathy. Fonder of objects than people, he becomes a talented carpenter who enjoys making beautiful things to contrast with the ugliness he sees around him.

Francine is a beautiful young woman who was traumatised in her childhood by the murder of her mother. After the incident, her father got remarried to a psychotherapist, who promises Francine that she will do anything to keep her out of harm's way. True to her word, she keeps such a close eye on Francine that it reaches overprotection to the point of obsession.

Teddy meets Francine by chance and falls in love for her. He presents to her, in her perspective, an opportunity for freedom at last.

Meanwhile, Harriet is a woman who has used her looks to get ahead and found herself in a loveless marriage to a rich older man. She assuages her loneliness by having affairs with handymen whom she brings to her house. She considers herself an extremely beautiful middle-aged woman and believes that she does not look a day over 25. She is portrayed as delusional, jealous and self-absorbed to the point of obsession.

== Reception ==
T. J. Binyon of the Evening Standard called it "extraordinarily funny" and a "triumph of black comedy" and praised the "wholly absorbing" narrative. Margo Kaufman of the Los Angeles Times called the novel a "stay-up-all-night read with a nail-biting climax" and praised the "vividly drawn" characters.
