= Valentin Valentin =

- Film poster
- Directed by: Pascal Thomas
- Written by: François Caviglioli; Clémence de Biéville; Pascal Bonitzer; Pascal Thomas; Nathalie Lafaurie
- Based on: Tigerlily's Orchids by Ruth Rendell
- Produced by: Saïd Ben Saïd; Nathalie Lafaurie; Michel Merkt
- Starring: Marilou Berry; Vincent Rottiers; Marie Gillain
- Cinematography: Jean-Marc Fabre
- Edited by: Yann Dedet
- Production company: SBS Productions
- Distributed by: SBS Distribution
- Release date: 7 January 2015
- Running time: 106 minutes
- Country: France
- Language: French
- Budget: $7.3 million
- Box office: $355.000

Valentin Valentin is a 2015 French crime mystery film directed by Pascal Thomas and starring Marilou Berry, Vincent Rottiers and Marie Gillain.

== Plot ==
The beautiful and shy Valentin, with whom all the women fall in love, has much to do between his insatiable mistress, Claudia; her jealous husband, Freddy; his selfish and immature mother; alcoholic neighbor, Jane; the concierge Antonia; the three neighboring youths on the 5th Floor, Noor, Florence and especially Elodie; and a mysterious young Chinese Tiger Lily, held in slavery in the house opposite.

There is a housewarming, with all the neighbors and friends of the neighborhood, triggering unexpected violence. Soon after, Valentin is found murdered in the nearby park under the bridge where he had to wait for Tiger Lily. Who committed the crime?

== Cast ==
- Marilou Berry as Elodie
- Vincent Rottiers as Valentin Fontaine
- Marie Gillain as Claudia Livorno
- Arielle Dombasle as Valentin's mother
- Geraldine Chaplin as Jane
- Alexandra Stewart as Sylvia
- François Morel as Roger
- Isabelle Candelier as Rose
- Louis-Do de Lencquesaing as Freddy Livorno
- Christian Morin as Marius
- Agathe Bonitzer as Florence
- Christian Vadim as Sergio
- Christine Citti as Antonia
- Félix Moati as Romain
- Victoria Lafaurie as Noor
- Paul Minthe as Aymé
- Karolina Conchet as Lys Tigré
- Xin Wang as Madame Hou
- Pascal Bonitzer as The Inspector
