= No Night Is Too Long (novel) =

1994 novel by Barbara Vine

No Night is Too Long
- First edition (UK)
- Author: Barbara Vine
- Language: English
- Genre: Crime / Mystery novel
- Publisher: Viking (UK); Harmony (US)
- Publication date: 26 May 1994
- Publication place: United Kingdom
- Media type: Print (Hardback and Paperback) and Audiobook (Cassette)
- Pages: 336 (paperback edition)
- ISBN: 0-14-025040-9
- OCLC: 43212332
- Preceded by: Asta's Book
- Followed by: The Brimstone Wedding

No Night is Too Long is a 1994 crime / mystery novel depicting a bisexual love triangle, a possible murder and the aftermath. The book was penned by British writer Ruth Rendell, writing as Barbara Vine.

== Plot summary ==
Set in Alaska and Suffolk, this story is written in three first-person narrations, the first and longest of which is the memoir-confession of Tim Cornish.

Tim, a would-be novelist of twenty-four, has just received his master's degree. He travels to Alaska for a nature-exploration cruise with his older male lover, Ivo, a paleontologist who will be lecturing during the cruise.

Tim has been living with and supported by Ivo, but, since Ivo's recent declaration of love, Tim has tired of him.

Ashore in Juneau while Ivo is elsewhere, Tim meets Isabel, an unhappily married, somewhat older woman, with whom Tim immediately falls in love, and he promises to meet her in Seattle after breaking up with Ivo (who he pretends is a woman). When Tim tells Ivo their relationship is over, Ivo refuses to accept it. On an excursion to an uninhabited island, the two men tussle; Tim strikes Ivo, who then strikes his head against a tree. Leaving Ivo for dead, Tim flees the island and rejoins the cruise, saying nothing of what has happened.

Tim helps himself to the cash and credit card Ivo left behind and flies to Seattle, hoping to find Isabel, but his guilt causes him to abandon that plan and he returns to the UK, where he settles into an unchallenging job in his hometown and lives alone in his parents' house. As there has been no word of a police inquiry and no report of the finding of Ivo's body, Tim seems to have committed the perfect crime, though he is increasingly haunted by what he has done, believing he sees Ivo everywhere. Then he begins to receive a series of anonymous letters, each of which describes the island ordeal—and rescue—of a castaway.

Isabel's own brief memoir, in the form of a letter of sorts to Ivo, and a concluding letter to his wife by a schoolboy friend of Tim's who becomes Tim's solicitor, complete the book, which explores questions of sexual identity, fidelity, and guilt.

== TV adaptation ==
The BBC produced a film dramatisation of the novel in 2002, starring Marc Warren as Ivo Steadman and Lee Williams as Tim Cornish.
