= Dagger of Daggers =

Crime novel writers award

The Dagger of Daggers was a special award given in 2005 by the Crime Writers' Association (CWA) to celebrate its 50th anniversary. All books that had previously won the CWA Gold Dagger for Best Crime Novel of the Year were eligible, and the purpose was to select "the best of the best". The shortlist was selected by a ballot of CWA members, with the winner decided by a second round of voting.

== Winner ==
- John le Carré - The Spy Who Came in from the Cold 1963

== Shortlist ==
- Anthony Price - Other Paths to Glory 1974
- Martin Cruz Smith - Gorky Park 1981
- Peter Lovesey - The False Inspector Dew 1982
- Barbara Vine (Ruth Rendell) - A Fatal Inversion 1987
- Reginald Hill - Bones and Silence 1990
- Val McDermid - The Mermaids Singing 1995
