= A Spot of Folly =

Collection of short stories by Ruth Rendell

- First edition
- Author: Ruth Rendell
- Language: English
- Publisher: Profile Books
- Publication date: 2017
- Publication place: United Kingdom
- ISBN: 1-78816-014-2

A Spot of Folly is a collection of short stories by English writer Ruth Rendell. Subtitled "Ten And A Quarter New Tales Of Murder and Mayhem" the collection was published in 2017, two years after Rendell's death. The stories in the collection had been previously published in crime fiction magazines between 1970 and 2005, most of them in Ellery Queen's Mystery Magazine.
