= A Demon in My View =

1976 novel by Ruth Rendell

- First edition cover (UK)
- Author: Ruth Rendell
- Language: English
- Genre: Crime, Mystery Novel
- Publisher: Hutchinson (UK); Doubleday (US)
- Publication date: 3 May 1976
- Publication place: United Kingdom
- Media type: Print (Hardback & Paperback)
- Pages: 184 pp (first edition, hardback)
- ISBN: 0-09-126100-7 (first edition, hardback)
- OCLC: 2895691
- Dewey Decimal: 823/.9/14
- LC Class: PZ4.R4132 De PR6068.E63

A Demon in My View is a novel by British author Ruth Rendell. First published in 1976, it won the CWA Gold Dagger for Best Crime Novel of the Year, gaining Rendell the first of six Dagger awards she received during her career, more than any other writer.

== Synopsis ==
Arthur leads a solitary life as a clerk, bookkeeper, and part-time rent collector for his landlord. For 20 years he has lived in a building attached by his emotional entanglment with a mannequin deep in the cellar. Unbeknownst to anyone else, he uses the maninequin to unleash his violent tendencies in darkness and solitude. This tenuous mental equilibrium is threatened when a doctoral candidate in psychology becomes the building's newest tenant. Danger unfolds as the mannequin is discovered and the scholar stumbles on Arthur's dark secrets.

== Themes ==
Apart from its narrative momentum, as the lives of a disparate collection of lodgers in a down-at-heel rooming house fatally intertwine and unravel, the novel perceptively and accurately depicts "Kenbourne Vale" a fictional North West London suburb, during the 1970s public services strikes, with a shifting population, old terraced houses being demolished or cropped up into cheap rental warrens, grimy waste-ground and car-parks, Council housing estates, pretentiously named streets, cheap corner shops and kebab houses. It's a world of self-service launderettes, overflowing dustbins and neglected amenities. The novel is full of cool observation and irony, touching on sexism, feminism and racism (key social themes of the 1970s). The major irony is that an aggressively normal research graduate is writing a thesis on criminal psychopathy, sharing his surname and lodgings with a repressed psychopath; and his innocent, well-meant action forces the strangler out onto the streets in search of real victims again.

The novel also explores the nature of sexual love, obsession, and marital infidelity. The psychopath's sexual inadequacy and homicidal urges are shown to be the result of a loveless, repressed upbringing by a maiden aunt. The research writer is engaged in a passionate affair with a married woman and is allowing her a period of separation to decide whether or not to leave her husband for him. The lodging house also contains a series of individuals or couples engaged in ironically paralleled marital, sexual and social relationships that often appear exploitative, inadequate or shabby. By contrast, the researcher and his lover, and a couple of his Caribbean friends, come together during the book, in relationships that offer a positive alternative to the general dysfunction of the other characters' relationships and values.These interwoven strands come together by the end of the novel.

== Film version ==
The novel was made into a film, also titled A Demon in My View, in 1991. It starred Anthony Perkins and was also set in London. The film, directed by Petra Haffter, won the Special Jury Prize at the 3rd Yubari International Fantastic Film Festival in February 1992.
