= Joseph Hergesheimer =

American novelist (1880–1954)

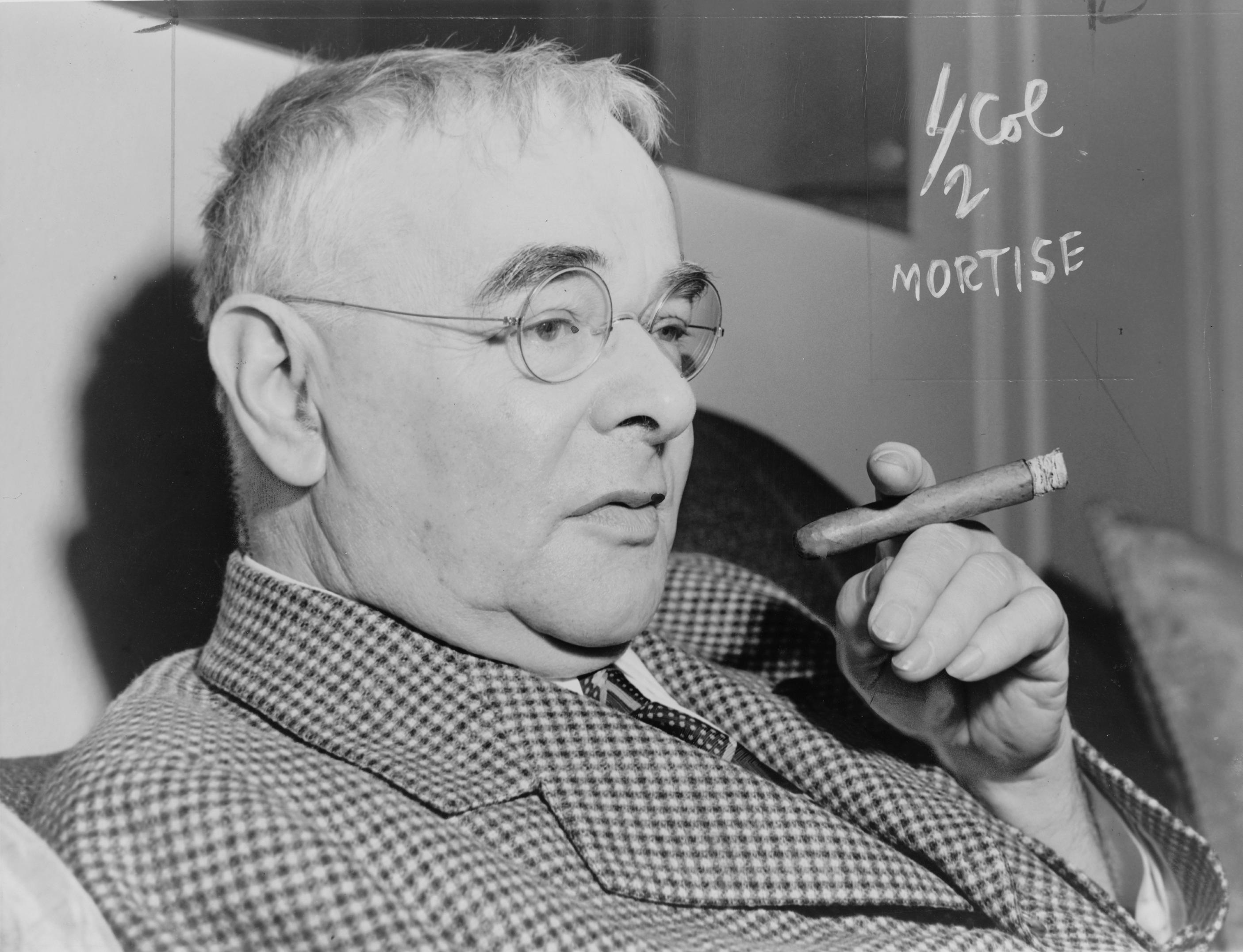
- Hergesheimer (1940)
- Born: February 15, 1880; Philadelphia, Pennsylvania, U.S.
- Died: April 25, 1954 (aged 74); Sea Isle City, New Jersey, U.S.
- Resting place: Oaklands Cemetery
- Education: Pennsylvania Academy of the Fine Arts
- Occupation: Novelist
- Spouse: Dorothy Hemphill

Joseph Hergesheimer (/ˈhərɡəsˌhaɪmər/) (February 15, 1880 – April 25, 1954) was an American writer of the early 20th century known for his novels of decadent life among the wealthy.

== Early life ==
Hergesheimer was born on February 15, 1880, in Philadelphia, Pennsylvania. He was often ill as a child and his only education was about three years of instruction at Germantown Friends School, a Quaker institution in Philadelphia. He briefly attended the Pennsylvania Academy of the Fine Arts. When Hergesheimer was 21, his grandfather died and left him an inheritance. He then traveled to Italy, where he lived as a painter in Venice. Having squandered his fortune, Hergesheimer was forced to return to America.

== Career ==
Hergesheimer was unable to sell any of his writing in the first ten years of his career. Finally, in 1913, he sold a story to the Saturday Evening Post. He published his first novel, The Lay Anthony, in 1914. Three Black Pennys, which followed in 1917, chronicled the fictional lives of three generations of Pennsylvania ironmasters and cemented the author's style of dealing with upperclass characters through a floridly descriptive style he referred to as "aestheticism." Three Black Pennys was also the first original American novel published by the newly formed Alfred A. Knopf publishing house. Hergesheimer also received critical recognition for his novels Java Head (1919), Linda Condon (1919), and Balisand (1924).

Hergesheimer's reputation fluctuated wildly in his own lifetime, from a peak of acclaim and popularity in the 1920s to almost total obscurity by the time of his death. Java Head, a miscegenation story told from multiple viewpoints that is generally considered his best novel, was a considerable popular success, and his flamboyant, ornate, highly descriptive style (which can be seen to best effect in works like the travelogue San Cristobal de la Habana) was considered elegant and powerful. Hergesheimer's manner of writing, known at the time as the "aesthetic" school (in which he was frequently paired with James Branch Cabell), remained in demand throughout the 1920s (with F. Scott Fitzgerald's The Great Gatsby being the most durable example of a book written in this style). Sinclair Lewis's novel Babbitt includes an extensive passage in which the title character reads from Three Black Pennys. A 1922 poll of critics in Literary Digest voted Hergesheimer the "most important American writer" working at the time. Hergesheimer's works of long-form and short fiction sold well with both male and female readerships; a 1929 teaser in for an upcoming serialized story in Cosmopolitan, for example, called Hergesheimer a writer "who understands women better than any writer alive today." On the other hand, John Drinkwater wrote that "His constant complaint is that women readers, with their craving for sentimentality, are a blighting influence upon the American fiction of the age."

Tastes changed decisively in the 1930s, however, with both critics and writers favoring a more terse, tough-guy style. Hergesheimer's gift for flowery writing did not translate well in this new environment, and by the middle of the decade his popularity had fizzled. His last novel The Foolscap Rose, appeared in 1934. H.L. Mencken's diary describes Hergesheimer's frustration at the decline of his popularity and the lack of interest by his publishers, and according to one literary legend, when Hergesheimer asked why nobody was interested in his books anymore, Mencken replied, "I don't know, Joe. I'll always enjoy watching you swing from tree to tree."

Hergesheimer's reputation has not recovered from this low point, although he still has some champions. The weakness in his method can be seen in books like Cytherea, wherein the author's aesthetic concerns overwhelm all other aspects of the writing, resulting in thin plot and characterization and a certain precious quality in the descriptions. Indeed, Clifton Fadiman considered his novels to be "deficient in mere brain-power." On the other hand, his descriptive writing occasionally holds great power. When asked in 1962 what was his favorite American novel, Samuel Beckett replied "one of the best I ever read was Hergesheimer's Java Head."

His short story "Tol'able David" was made into a highly successful and acclaimed 1921 silent film. Other notable film adaptations include Java Head (US, 1923), The Bright Shawl (US, 1923), Wild Oranges (1924), and Cytherea (1924), and Java Head (UK, 1934). Eight films and one television special were adapted from Hergesheimer's work.

== Personal life and death ==
In 1899, Hergesheimer moved to West Chester, Pennsylvania, where he met his future wife, Dorothy Hemphill. They married in 1907. In West Chester, they resided in the 18th-century Dower House, which they modernized with the help of the architect R. Brognard Okie. (In 1926, Hergesheimer published From an Old House, a book describing the home and its many improvements.). At Dower House, the couple entertained the likes of F. Scott Fitzgerald and Dorothy Parker. The illustrator N.C. Wyeth, who lived nearby, was a close personal friend. In 1945, they relocated to Stone Harbor, New Jersey.

Hergesheimer died on April 25, 1954, in Sea Isle City, New Jersey. He was buried at Oaklands Cemetery in West Chester, Pennsylvania.

== Works ==
=== Novels ===
- The Lay Anthony (Mitchell Kennerley, 1914; Alfred A. Knopf, 1919)
- Mountain Blood (Kennerley, 1915; Knopf, 1919)
- The Three Black Pennys (Knopf, 1917)
- Java Head (Knopf, 1919)
- Linda Condon (Knopf, 1919)
- Cytherea (Knopf, 1922)
- The Bright Shawl (Knopf, 1922)
- The Presbyterian Child (Knopf, 1923)
- Balisand (Knopf, 1924)
- Tampico (Knopf, 1926)
- The Limestone Tree (1929)
- The Party Dress (Knopf, 1930)
- Berlin (Knopf, 1931)
- The Foolscap Rose (Knopf, 1934)

=== Collections of short fiction ===
- Gold and Iron (Knopf, 1918) LCCN 18-14422
  - "Wild Oranges" (novella)
  - "Tubal Cain" (novella)
  - "The Dark Fleece" (novella)
- The Happy End (Knopf, 1919)
  - "Tol'able David" (1917)
- Quiet Cities (Knopf, 1928)
- Tropical Winter (Knopf, 1933)

=== Belles-Lettres ===
- San Cristobal de la Habana (Knopf, 1920)
- From an Old House (Knopf, 1925)
- Swords & Roses (Knopf, 1929)
