= Make Death Love Me =

1979 novel by Ruth Rendell

- First edition cover (UK)
- Author: Ruth Rendell
- Language: English
- Genre: Crime, Mystery novel
- Publisher: Hutchinson (UK); Doubleday (US)
- Publication date: 1979
- Publication place: United Kingdom
- Media type: Print (Hardback & Paperback)
- Pages: 215 pp
- ISBN: 0-09-136630-5
- OCLC: 6062815

Make Death Love Me (1979) is a psychological crime novel by English author Ruth Rendell, regarded by some as one of her bleakest and most powerful stories. The novel was shortlisted for an Edgar and won Sweden's prestigious Martin Beck Award.

== Summary ==
Alan Groombridge, forty-ish, manages a tiny sub-branch of the Anglian-Victorian Bank in the fictional Suffolk town of Childon, assisted only by a young cashier, Joyce Culver. His humdrum, suburban life (a loveless marriage, two charmless, selfish children - an adult son and teenage daughter - an obnoxious father-in-law living with them and a vapid social life) is at odds with an imagined fantasy existence, inspired by his reading. "He had come late in life to the heady intoxication of literature and it had poisoned him for what he had... He became discontented with his lot... Unless all these authors were liars, there was an inner life and an outer experience, an infinite number of things to be seen and done, and there was passion."

Coincidence and random events driven by the independent, often unwitting or unconscious actions or words of various characters, lead to a half-baked armed robbery of the bank by two young men, Marty Foster and Nigel Thaxby, who neatly parallel Alan and Joyce. Marty, the alcoholic, grubby, unloved product of a rural working-class background, is a streetwise realist, while the strikingly handsome, lazy Nigel, has rejected his minor public-school education, middle-class parents and their aspirations for him. Both young men, without scruple and looking for an easy life, rob the bank at gunpoint and are obliged to abduct Joyce because she has seen their faces. It appears to police that Alan has also been abducted, but in fact he hid during the bank raid and, in a moment of madness, absconded with £3,000 the robbers overlooked.

These four central characters are holed up in London for most of the novel. Marty and Nigel swiftly lose control of the situation and find themselves effectively the prisoner of their captive, Joyce, unable to benefit from their robbery, enjoy the stolen money or resolve an impossible situation. Under a false identity, Alan establishes his long-dreamed-of life of cultural, emotional, sexual and spiritual fulfilment, and falls in love, but, plagued by guilt, he is also trapped in a situation that offers no clear resolution.

The explosive climax for these reluctantly and fatally entangled characters is bleak indeed. Ruth Rendell brilliantly offsets the soul-destroying, humdrum life of ordinary people lacking imagination or aspiration, against the perilous world of the fantasist, denying reality or struggling to escape into an imagined life. "Like Alan Groombridge, Nigel lived in a world of dreams." The theme is neatly embodied in a character we never actually meet, but who plays a key role in the world to which Alan briefly escapes - Ambrose Engstrand a "Neo-Empiricist" philosopher and psychologist, whose books (The Glory of the Real, Dream, the Opiate etc) argue his belief that dreams, fantasies, fiction and literature are pernicious and dangerous distractions from the reality of human existence.
