= Portobello (novel) =

2008 novel by Ruth Rendell

- First edition (UK)
- Author: Ruth Rendell
- Cover artist: Photomontage derived from pictures supplied by Getty Images
- Language: English
- Publisher: Hutchinson (UK); Doubleday (Canada)
- Publication date: Nov 2008
- Publication place: United Kingdom
- Media type: Print (Hardback)
- Pages: 278 pp.
- ISBN: 978-0091925840 (hardback), ISBN 978-0091925857 (trade paperback)
- OCLC: 244314490

Portobello is a novel by British writer Ruth Rendell, published in 2008. It is set in and around the Portobello Road in Notting Hill, London. Written in the third-person narrative mode, it follows the lives of a number of Londoners—rich and poor—living near the Portobello Road Market whose paths cross by accident. In other words, Portobello is about "the destinies of an oddly assorted group of people, whose only common characteristic is their postcode."

Throughout the novel, something menacing seems to lurk behind every street corner, and the suspicion that something awful or sinister is going to happen any minute "(this is after all a novel by Ruth Rendell) is what hooks the reader" As "one of the leading chroniclers of contemporary London", Rendell has known the area and its inhabitants for so long that her "take on Notting Hill restores some of the rawness taken away by gentrification and the saccharine stammer of the film of the same name."

== Plot summary ==
The central character of the novel is Eugene Wren, a wealthy, middle-aged art dealer whose secretive personality jeopardizes both his sanity and his relationship with, and eventual engagement to, Ella Cotswold, an attractive general practitioner ten years his junior. Having in the past overcome various slight addictions to alcohol, nicotine, and food, Wren gets hooked on a special brand of sugar-free sweet, which he wants to conceal from his fiancée. When the couple decide that Ella should sell her flat and she moves in with him, he starts inventing excuses and lies so as to be alone just for the time it takes to suck a sweet and to get rid of the sweet smell on his breath afterwards. Extremely ashamed of his habit, he buys, hoards, and consumes the sweets secretly, and he establishes several caches in his antique-studded home. When Ella happens to find one of them, out of curiosity goes on to search the rest of the house, and finally confronts Wren with her find, he is so ashamed of himself that he sees no other way than to break off their engagement and move into a hotel.
