= The Lake of Darkness =

1980 novel by Ruth Rendell

- First edition (UK)
- Author: Ruth Rendell
- Language: English
- Genre: Crime, mystery novel
- Publisher: Hutchinson (UK); Doubleday (US)
- Publication date: April 1980
- Publication place: United Kingdom
- Media type: Print (hardback & paperback)
- Pages: 201 pp
- ISBN: 0-09-140810-5
- OCLC: 15591919

The Lake of Darkness is a novel by British writer Ruth Rendell, first published in 1980. It won the Arts Council National Book Award for Genre Fiction in 1981.

The title comes from a quotation from Shakespeare's King Lear:

"Frateretto calls me; and tells me Nero is an angler in the lake of darkness. Pray, innocent, and beware the foul fiend".

== Plot summary ==
Set in the Highgate-Archway area of North London, the novel's protagonist is Martin Urban, a young accountant leading a comfortable, complacent and rather dull bachelor life, in his own flat, attended by a peppery, older male cleaner, and visiting his doting parents regularly. When Martin unexpectedly wins a large sum of money in a football pool, he shrinks from telling or sharing his win with one of his clients, a dashing, feckless small-time journalist he secretly admires but affects to disapprove of. It was this client who procured Martin the winning ticket. Instead, Martin decides to give half the money away to personally-identified worthy causes, all of whom, to Martin's bemusement and dismay, entirely misinterpret his gestures of generosity. Suddenly, Francesca enters his life, a mysterious young woman who works in a flower shop and captures his heart. He also meets Finn, the self-sufficient, twisted son of his mother's cleaning lady, Lena, a vulnerable eccentric absorbed in astrology, crystals, tarot and so on. Finn works as all-round handyman for a dodgy landlord, who pays him to evict (or murder) sitting tenants from his rental properties. Martin's naivety and misplaced good intentions become fatally entangled with Finn's macabre madness and the machinations of others around Martin he completely fails to understand. The tragic outcome opens Martin's eyes and destroys his world.
