= Dark Corners (novel) =

2015 novel by Ruth Rendell

- First edition (publ. Hutchinson)
- Author: Ruth Rendell
- Language: English
- Publication date: 2015

Dark Corners is a 2015 crime fiction novel by British writer Ruth Rendell, the last she wrote before her death that same year. The novel has no dedication or epigraph. The title of the book is taken from a phrase in the William Shakespeare play Measure for Measure.

== Plot ==
Novelist Carl Martin has fallen on hard times financially, so when he inherits a house after his father's passing he quickly rents the upper floors to the first person he interviews, the strange and intense Dermot McKinnon.

Carl's other inheritance is a collection of alternative medicines his father had amassed, including a diet pill that had been recently linked to a few deaths.

After some unfortunate events Carl is blackmailed by Dermot and begins to spiral into darkness while more information about his tenant is brought to light.
