= Going Wrong =

1990 novel by Ruth Rendell

- Author: Ruth Rendell
- Language: English
- Genre: Crime, Mystery novel
- Publisher: Hutchinson (UK); Mysterious Press (US)
- Publication date: 6 September 1990
- Publication place: United Kingdom
- Media type: Print (Hardback & Paperback)
- Pages: 250 pp
- ISBN: 0-09-174300-1
- OCLC: 21293413

Going Wrong is a psychological thriller by English crime writer Ruth Rendell.

The novel was published in 1990 by Hutchinson in the UK and Mysterious Press in the US.

== Synopsis ==
When he was a young man, Guy Curran led a local street gang and dealt drugs before falling madly in love with Leonora Chisholm, a much more middle-class teenager whose society minded parents naturally disapproved of him.

Despite an initially passionate romance, the fairy tale subsides, and Leonora agrees to remain friends. The two begin a ritual of meeting for lunch on Saturdays, ostensibly to mollify Guy's continuing unrequited love. Guy attempts to phone her daily.

We gradually learn about an incident in Guy's past that led him to go straight, although his current business interests maintain an air of sleaze, and his nouveau riche sensibility contrasts sharply with Leonora's values. Despite their obvious differences, Guy becomes convinced that Leonora's rejection only stems from someone telling her about his worst moment during his days in the underworld.

When Leonora tells a distraught Guy that she has found a new love, this announcement sets off a dark chain of events that will lead Guy into even more obsession, stalking, and finally murder.
