= Tigerlily's Orchids =

2010 novel by Ruth Rendell

- First paperback edition front cover
- Author: Ruth Rendell
- Language: English
- Genre: Crime, Mystery novel
- Publisher: Hutchinson
- Publication date: 15 August 2010
- Publication place: United Kingdom
- Media type: Print (Hardback & Paperback)
- Pages: 280 pp
- ISBN: 978-0-09-193686-0
- OCLC: 639171764

Tigerlily's Orchids is a 2010 book by the British crime-writer Ruth Rendell. It is her 60th published novel.

== Critical reception ==
Tigerlily's Orchids was well received by critics. Sue Gaisford of The Independent wrote in a positive reviews: "Ruth Rendell, grande dame of the thriller, knows how to spring surprises. Rendell inexorably accelerates the pace from tortoise to hare, and with wisdom, compassion and satisfactorily sardonic wit." Publishers Weekly wrote of the book: "Rendell's spare, sleek novel of psychological suspense gets off to a slow start, then picks up speed to become vintage Rendell, not the powerhouse of the 1990s but with enough plot petrol to blow most American authors out of the water ... as always, Rendell spices the action with just the right gothic ingredients to keep things baroque but consistently believable." Writing for The Guardian, Laura Wilson summarized the book as a "thoughtful, slow-paced and immensely readable novel ... about the effect that crimes, both small and large, have on the community." Another positive review came from Steve Donoghue of The Washington Post, who praised the novel's characters, writing: "Rendel presents us with [the characters] in all the scrupulous, almost forensic detail for which she’s famous. We get the aggressively supercilious building superintendent, the trio of flighty young girls, the brainless middle-aged married couple, the reserved elderly gentleman — all rendered perfectly, with the throwaway ease of a practiced master."

== Availability ==
Tigerlily's Orchids is available in multiple media formats, published simultaneously, the print edition from Random House Publishers, but also e-book and audio editions.

The unabridged audiobook edition (meaning 100% of the text is read by an actor) is published by Whole Story Audio Books (www.wholestoryaudio.co.uk) who specialise in the unabridged format and available to buy from their website as well as other retail sites. The narration is performed by actor Nickolas Grace.

An abridged audiobook is also available from Essence Abridged Audiobooks. Typically abridged audiobooks are not more than 60% of the author's work and as low as 30% with characters and plotlines removed.

== Adaptation ==
In 2015, the movie Valentin Valentin is released and it is based on the book.
