= The Reason Why: An Anthology of the Murderous Mind =

1995 book by Ruth Rendell

The Reason Why: An Anthology of the Murderous Mind is one of Ruth Rendell's few non-fiction works. It was first published by Jonathan Cape, London in 1995 and a US edition from Crown, New York followed in 1996.

The book describes more than 100 murders organized into eight chapters according to motive. A reviewer for Publishers Weekly criticized the book for being "too neat", saying the brief descriptions of true crimes "provide neither a serious analytical approach nor a rich imaginative one."
