= The New Girlfriend =

1985 short story collection by Ruth Rendell

- First edition (UK)
- Author: Ruth Rendell
- Language: English
- Genre: Crime, mystery
- Publisher: Hutchinson
- Publication date: 24 October 1985
- Publication place: United Kingdom
- Media type: Print (hardback & paperback)
- ISBN: 0-09-162020-1
- OCLC: 59083922

The New Girlfriend and Other Stories is a short story collection by British writer Ruth Rendell. The title story won the MWA Edgar Award for Best Short Story of the Year in 1984.

== Contents ==
The collection contains 11 stories:

1. The New Girlfriend
2. A Dark Blue Perfume
3. The Orchard Walls
4. Hare's House
5. Bribery and Corruption
6. The Whistler
7. The Convolvulus Clock
8. Loopy
9. Fen Hall
10. Father's Day
11. The Green Road to Quephanda
