= The Tree of Hands =

1984 suspense novel by Ruth Rendell

- First edition (UK)
- Author: Ruth Rendell
- Language: English
- Genre: Crime/Mystery novel
- Publisher: Hutchinson (UK); Pantheon Books (US)
- Publication date: 15 October 1984
- Publication place: United Kingdom
- Media type: Print (Hardback & Paperback)
- Pages: 270 pp
- ISBN: 0-09-158680-1
- OCLC: 59083643

The Tree of Hands is a 1984 suspense novel by the author Ruth Rendell. It won the CWA Silver Dagger in 1984, and was short listed for the MWA Edgar Award upon publication in America. The book has been filmed twice. One adaptation featured Lauren Bacall as the protagonist's mother.

== Plot summary ==
The Tree of Hands tells the story of an affluent young woman, Benet, who has a two-year-old son named James. She is estranged from James' father. They live in North London. Benet's mother comes to visit them. She and Benet's father now live in Spain. Benet's mother has a history of mental illness, possibly schizophrenia, and Benet is rather fearful of her mother and what she may be capable of doing.

Unfortunately James becomes extremely ill and dies, Benet is distraught and spends a lot of time in a state of prostrated grief. Her mother tries to look after her. A sub-plot involves a young man on a council estate who is deeply in love with a woman, Carol, who has several children from previous partners. It becomes apparent to the reader that she is unfaithful to this young man, and she is abusing her children, in particular her little boy, Jason. A turn in events leads to Benet's mother kidnapping little Jason and "replacing" the dead James. Benet, at first horrified at what her mother has done, begins to realise that little Jason has been abused (she finds cigarette burns on his body) and grows to love him. As he refers to himself as Jay, this is what she calls him. However, she realises that she cannot continue to see the Doctor from the hospital because he knows that James has died, and he has been very kind to her. He may start to question Jason's appearance. Also Benet's ex begins to realise what may have happened and puts pressure on her. She realises that she and Jay must leave the country in order to start their new life.

The sub plot (Carol and her friends and family) evolves into murder and betrayal, and a very clever twist involving the sale of a house in Hampstead.

The title "Tree of Hands" refers to a piece of artwork displayed on the wall in the ward that James was admitted to when first taken ill.
