= Ruth Rendell =

English writer (1930–2015)

The Right Honourable The Baroness Rendell of Babergh CBE
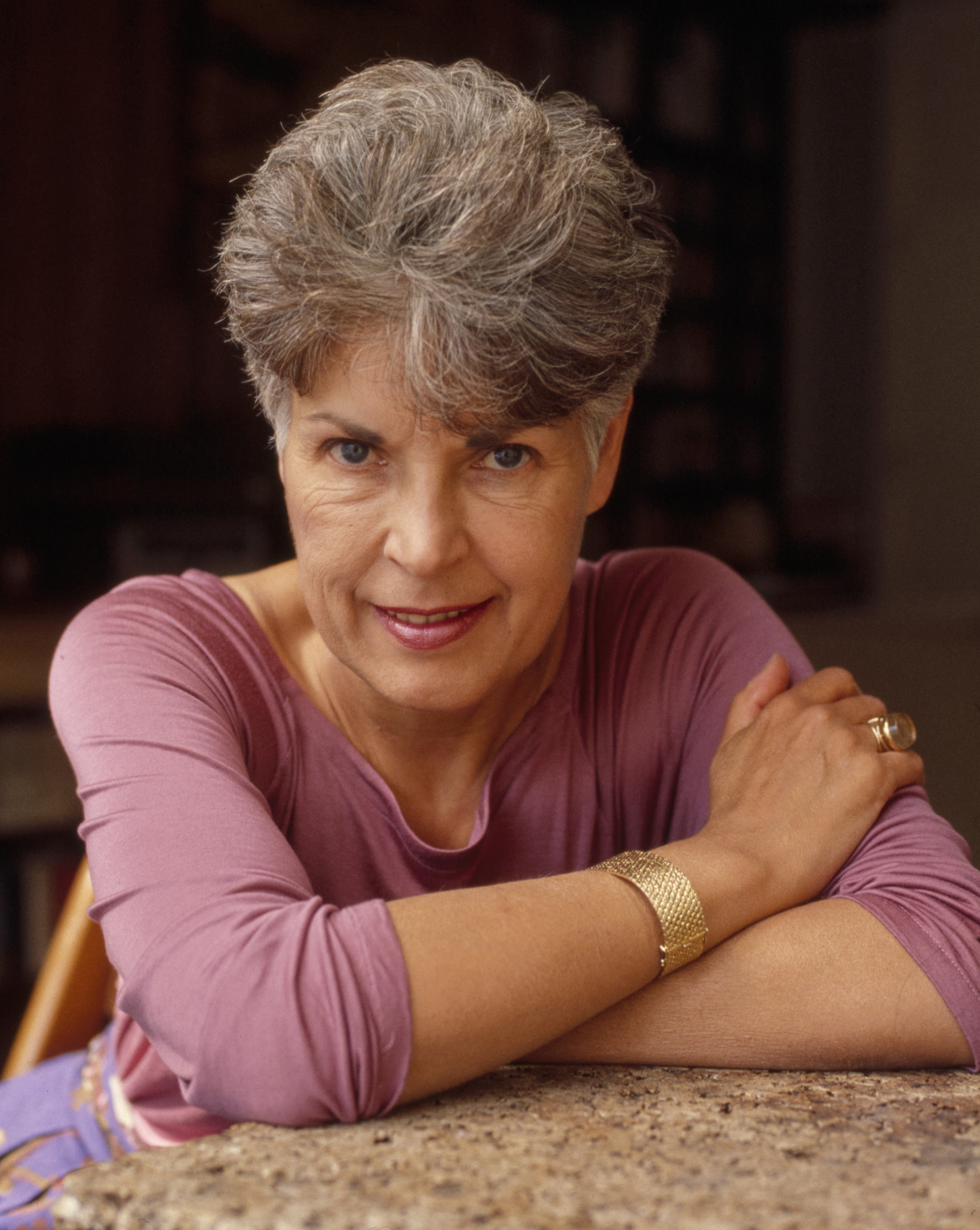
- Rendell in 1985
- Born: Ruth Barbara Grasemann; 17 February 1930; Woodford, Essex, England
- Died: 2 May 2015 (aged 85); London, England
- Occupation: Novelist
- Writing career
- Pen name: Ruth Rendell; Barbara Vine
- Genres: Psychological thriller; murder mystery

Member of the House of Lords
- Lord Temporal
- Life peerage 24 October 1997 – 2 May 2015

Ruth Barbara Rendell, Baroness Rendell of Babergh, CBE (née Grasemann; 17 February 1930 – 2 May 2015) was an English author of thrillers and psychological murder mysteries.

Rendell is best known for creating Chief Inspector Wexford. A second string of works was a series of unrelated crime novels that explored the psychological background of criminals and their victims. This theme was developed further in a third series of novels, published under the pseudonym Barbara Vine.

Rendell has sold an estimated 20 million copies of her novels.

== Early life ==
Rendell was born as Ruth Barbara Grasemann in 1930, in South Woodford, Essex (now Greater London). Her parents were teachers. Her mother, Ebba Kruse, was born in Sweden to Danish parents and brought up in Denmark; her father, Arthur Grasemann, was English. As a result of spending Christmas and other holidays in Scandinavia, Rendell learned Swedish and Danish. Rendell was educated at the County High School for Girls in Loughton, Essex, the town to which the family moved during her childhood. In 2016 a blue plaque was unveiled at her former home, 45 Millsmead Way, Loughton, in recognition of her time living there.

After high school, she became a feature writer for her local Essex paper, the Chigwell Times. She submitted a story narrating a local sports club dinner she had not attended. Because of her absence from the dinner, she did not know that the after-dinner speaker had died midway through the speech, and she failed to report it. She was subsequently forced to resign.

== Personal life ==
Rendell met her husband Don Rendell (not to be confused with the British saxophonist of the same name) when she was working as a newswriter. They married in 1950, when she was 20, and in 1953 had a son, Simon, now a psychiatrist-social worker who lives in the U.S. state of Colorado. The couple divorced in 1975 but remarried two years later. Don Rendell died in 1999 from prostate cancer.

She made the county of Suffolk her home for many years, using the settings in several of her novels. She lived in the villages of Polstead and later Groton, both east of Sudbury. She was appointed a Commander of the Order of the British Empire (CBE) in the 1996 Birthday Honours and a life peer as Baroness Rendell of Babergh, of Aldeburgh in the County of Suffolk, on 24 October 1997. She sat in the House of Lords for the Labour Party. In 1998, Rendell was named in a list of the party's biggest private financial donors. She introduced into the Lords the bill that would later become the Female Genital Mutilation Act 2003 (the intent was to prevent the practice).

In August 2014, Rendell was one of 200 public figures who were signatories to a letter to The Guardian expressing their hope that Scotland would vote to remain part of the United Kingdom in September's referendum on that issue.

Rendell was a vegetarian who was described as living mostly on fruit. She described herself as "slightly agoraphobic" and slept in a specially made four-poster bed because "I like to feel enclosed."

She was a patron of the charity Kids for Kids.

== Awards ==
Baroness Rendell's awards include the Silver, Gold, and Cartier Diamond Daggers from the Crime Writers' Association, three Edgars from the Mystery Writers of America, The Arts Council National Book Awards, and The Sunday Times Literary Award. A number of her works (see the section below) have been adapted for film or television. She was also a patron of the charity Kids for Kids which helps children in rural areas of Darfur. There is a blue plaque on one of her homes, 45 Millsmead Way, in Loughton. This was unveiled by her son Simon on 24 February 2016. Four of her novels appear on the British-based Crime Writers Association Poll (1990) of the best crime fiction novels ever written: two under the Rendell name and two under her pen name of Barbara Vine.

Her Crime Writer's Association Dagger wins (four Gold, one Silver and one Cartier Diamond) remains unmatched, as does her record of being the first author to be nominated and win under multiple names. Her unparalleled Edgar and Dagger finalist nominations include: A Judgement In Stone (1977 Gold Dagger finalist), A Sleeping Life (1979 Edgar finalist for Best Novel), Make Death Love Me (1980 Edgar finalist for Best Novel), The Speaker Of Mandarin (1983 Gold Dagger finalist), An Unkindness Of Ravens and The Tree Of Hands (both 1986 Edgar finalists for Best Novel), A Dark-Adapted Eye (as Barbara Vine, 1986 Gold Dagger finalist), A Fatal Inversion (as Barbara Vine, 1988 Macavity Award finalist for Best Novel), and Going Wrong (1990 Gold Dagger finalist.) Additionally, she was nominated four times in the Edgar Best Short Story category (in 1976 for "The Fall Of The Coin" and 1977 for "People Don’t Do Such Things"), winning twice for "The Fallen Curtain" (1975) and "The New Girlfriend" (1984).

== Death ==
Rendell suffered a stroke on 7 January 2015, and she died on 2 May at St George's Hospital in Tooting, London. Her ashes were interred in the churchyard of St Bartholomew's Church, Groton, beside those of her husband.

=== Legacy ===
The Ruth Rendell Award was introduced in 2016 by the National Literacy Trust. It is awarded to authors for their work in inspiring children and improving their literacy.

== Developing the thriller genre ==
Rendell wrote two unpublished novels before the 1964 publication of From Doon with Death, which was purchased for £75 by John Long; it was the first mystery to feature Chief Inspector Reginald Wexford. Rendell said that the character of Wexford was based on herself. The Monster in the Box, released in October 2009, was widely suggested to be Wexford's last case. This was incorrect; however it was the final novel featuring Wexford as an employed policeman. In the two following novels, The Vault and No Man's Nightingale, he was retired but was still involved in police investigations as a "consultant".

In Introducing Chief Inspector Wexford by Daniel Mallory he says (based on a 1990 interview with Rendell by Marilyn Stasio) that Rendell refers to the hated Agatha (Christie) and that awful Marple woman; and says of St. Mary Mead that she can hardly bear to say the name of that village where one finds a lot of normal, law-abiding people living ordinary, blameless lives, who suddenly decide to murder their aunt. Well, I don't believe that. (Introducing Chief Inspector Wexford by Daniel Mallory; from 1990 Rendell interview with Marilyn Stasio)

In addition to these police procedurals starring Wexford, Rendell wrote psychological crime novels exploring such themes as romantic obsession, misperceived communication, the impact of chance and coincidence, and the humanity of the criminals involved. Among such books are A Judgement in Stone, The Face of Trespass, Live Flesh, Talking to Strange Men, The Killing Doll, Going Wrong and Adam and Eve and Pinch Me. For the last novel published in her lifetime, The Girl Next Door, she returned to the Loughton of her childhood, with an implied comparison of the moral climate of wartime England and 2014.

Rendell created a third strand of writing with the publication in 1986 of A Dark-Adapted Eye under her pseudonym Barbara Vine (the name was derived from her own middle name and her great-grandmother's maiden name). King Solomon's Carpet, A Fatal Inversion and Asta's Book (alternative U.S. title, Anna's Book), among others, inhabited the same territory as her psychological crime novels while further developing themes of human misunderstandings and the unintended consequences of family secrets and hidden crimes. The author was noted for her elegant prose and sharp insights into the human mind, as well as her cogent plots and characters. Rendell injected the social changes of the last 40 years into her work, bringing awareness to such issues as domestic violence.

== Adaptations of her works ==
Many of her works have been adapted for radio, film, and television.

Television

The Inspector Wexford series was successfully televised, starring George Baker as Inspector Wexford and Christopher Ravenscroft as Detective Mike Burden, under the title The Ruth Rendell Mysteries, with 48 episodes from 1987 to 2000. Rendell praised Baker's performance, stating "It was a marvellous achievement as an actor to make him more and better than the author intended."

Two episodes of Tales of the Unexpected were based on Rendell's short stories - "A Glowing Future" (series 4, episode 15) and "People Don't Do Such Things" (series 8, episode 1).

Film

She said that Claude Chabrol's 1995 French version of A Judgement in Stone, La Cérémonie with Isabelle Huppert, Sandrine Bonnaire and Jacqueline Bisset, was one of the few film adaptations of her work that she was happy with. The novel was also filmed in 1986 with Rita Tushingham. Chabrol made La Demoiselle d'honneur in 2004, based on The Bridesmaid.

Other adaptations are Diary of the Dead (1976), from the book One Across, Two Down; 1991's A Demon In My View starred Anthony Perkins and Sophie Ward and was directed by Petra Haffter; the 1997 Pedro Almodóvar Spanish film Live Flesh; The Tree of Hands, directed by Giles Foster for Granada with Lauren Bacall (U.S. title: "Innocent Victim"); and another version of The Tree of Hands, Betty Fisher et autres histoires (2001, a.k.a. Alias Betty), with screenplay and direction by Claude Miller. The 2003 film Inquietudes from French director Gilles Bourdos was based on A Sight for Sore Eyes. François Ozon's 2015 film The New Girlfriend was based on Rendell's short story of the same name, and 2015's Valentin Valentin by Pascal Thomas was based on Tigerlily's Orchids.

Radio

Rendell's short story, "A Glowing Future", was adapted by BBC Radio 4, first broadcast in November 1992.

== Awards and honours ==
- 1975 – Mystery Writers of America Best Short Story Edgar: The Fallen Curtain
- 1975 - Current Crime's Silver Cup for Best Crime Novel: Shake Hands Forever
- 1976 - Gold Dagger for Fiction: A Demon In My View
- 1980 - Martin Beck Award for Best Crime Novel: Make Death Love Me
- 1981 - Arts Council National Book Award for Genre Fiction: The Lake Of Darkness
- 1984 - Mystery Writers of America Best Short Story Edgar: The New Girlfriend
- 1984 - Silver Dagger for Fiction: The Tree Of Hands
- 1986 - Gold Dagger for Fiction: Live Flesh
- 1987 – Mystery Writers of America Edgar Award: A Dark-Adapted Eye
- 1987 – Gold Dagger for Fiction: A Fatal Inversion
- 1988 – Angel Award for Fiction: The House of Stairs
- 1990 – Sunday Times Award for Literary Excellence
- 1991 – Gold Dagger for Fiction: King Solomon's Carpet
- 1991 – Cartier Diamond Dagger for a Lifetime's Achievement in the Field
- 1996 – Commander of the Order of the British Empire (CBE)
- 1997 - Life Peer as Baroness Rendell of Babergh
- 1997 - Mystery Writers of America Grand Master Award
- 2004 – Mystery Ink Gumshoe Award for Lifetime Achievement
- 2005 – CWA Dagger of Daggers (best crime novel to have won the Gold Dagger award (shortlist)): A Fatal Inversion
- 2007 – Gumshoe Award for Best European Crime Novel (shortlist): The Minotaur
- 2007 – Theakston's Old Peculier Crime Novel of the Year Award (longlist): End in Tears
- 2010 – Lost Man Booker Prize (longlist): A Guilty Thing Surprised

Coat of arms of Ruth Rendell
Escutcheon Gules three interlaced chevronels argent each ensigned by a brimstone butterfly displayed proper. Supporters On either side a bear statant erect proper gorged with a plain collar gobony gules and or fimbriated gules. Motto Vixi Scripsi Orders Commander of the Order of the British Empire

== Bibliography ==
=== Inspector Wexford series ===
1. From Doon with Death (1964) ISBN 978-0099588542
2. A New Lease of Death (1967) (American title: The Sins of the Fathers) ISBN 978-0099534792
3. Wolf to the Slaughter (1967) ISBN 978-0099534822
4. The Best Man to Die (1969) ISBN 978-0375704895
5. A Guilty Thing Surprised (1970) ISBN 978-0099534846
6. No More Dying Then (1971) ISBN 978-0375704895
7. Murder Being Once Done (1972)
8. Some Lie and Some Die (1973)
9. Shake Hands Forever (1975)
10. A Sleeping Life (1978)
11. Put on by Cunning (1981) (American title: Death Notes)
12. The Speaker of Mandarin (1983)
13. An Unkindness of Ravens (1985)
14. The Veiled One (1988)
15. Kissing the Gunner's Daughter (1991)
16. Simisola (1994)
17. Road Rage (1997)
18. Harm Done (1999) ISBN 978-0099281344
19. The Babes in the Wood (2002)
20. End in Tears (2005)
21. Not in the Flesh (2007)
22. The Monster in the Box (2009)
23. The Vault (2011)
24. No Man's Nightingale (2013)

=== Stand alone novels ===
- To Fear a Painted Devil (1965)
- Vanity Dies Hard (1966) (American title: In Sickness and in Health)
- The Secret House of Death (1968)
- One Across, Two Down (1971)
- The Face of Trespass (1974)
- A Demon in My View (1976)
- A Judgement in Stone (1977)
- Make Death Love Me (1979)
- The Lake of Darkness (1980)
- Master of the Moor (1982)
- The Killing Doll (1984)
- The Tree of Hands (1984)
- Live Flesh (1986)
- Talking to Strange Men (1987)
- The Bridesmaid (1989)
- Going Wrong (1990)
- The Crocodile Bird (1993)
- The Keys to the Street (1996)
- A Sight for Sore Eyes (1998)
- Adam and Eve and Pinch Me (2001)
- The Rottweiler (2003)
- Thirteen Steps Down (2004)
- The Water's Lovely (2006)
- Portobello (2008)
- Tigerlily's Orchids (2010)
- The Saint Zita Society (2012)
- The Girl Next Door (2014)
- Dark Corners (2015)

=== Novellas ===
- Thornapple (1982). Collected in The Fever Tree.
- Heartstones (1987). Uncollected.
- Piranha To Scurfy (1990). Collected in Piranha To Scurfy
- High Mysterious Union (1990). Collected in Piranha To Scurfy
- Blood Lines (1995). Collected in Blood Lines.
- The Strawberry Tree (1995). Collected in Blood Lines.
- The Thief (2006). Collected in A Spot of Folly.

=== Written as Barbara Vine ===
- A Dark-Adapted Eye (1986) ISBN 978-0452270640
- A Fatal Inversion (1987)
- The House of Stairs (1988)
- Gallowglass (1990)
- King Solomon's Carpet (1991)
- Asta's Book (1993) (American title: Anna's Book)
- No Night Is Too Long (1994)
- The Brimstone Wedding (1995)
- The Chimney Sweeper's Boy (1998)
- Grasshopper (2000)
- The Blood Doctor (2002)
- The Minotaur (2005)
- The Birthday Present (2008)
- The Child's Child (2012)

=== Short story collections ===
- The Fallen Curtain (1976)
- Means of Evil and Other Stories (1979) (five Inspector Wexford stories)
- The Fever Tree (1982)
- The New Girlfriend (1985)
- The Copper Peacock (1991)
- Blood Lines: Long and Short Stories (1995)
- Piranha to Scurfy (2000)
- Collected Short Stories, Volume 1 (2006)
- Collected Short Stories, Volume 2 (2008)
- A Spot of Folly (2017)

=== Uncollected short stories ===
- "The Martyr", included in Midsummer Nights (ed. Jeanette Winterson), Quercus, 2009

=== Uncollected round-robin short stories to which Rendell was a contributor ===
- "Death in the Square", co-authored with Peter Levi, Roald Dahl and Ted Willis, Daily Telegraph, 1988
- "Web of Intrigue", co-written with members of the public. Daily Telegraph, 1997

=== Non-fiction ===
- Ruth Rendell's Suffolk (1989)
- Undermining the Central Line: giving government back to the people (with Colin Ward, 1989) a political tract
- The Reason Why: An Anthology of the Murderous Mind (1995)

=== Children's books ===
- Archie & Archie (2013)
