= Doubleday Canada =

Canadian publishing company

- Parent company: Penguin Random House Canada
- Founded: 1936; 90 years ago
- Country of origin: Canada
- Headquarters location: Toronto, Ontario
- Publication types: Books
- Official website: www.penguinrandomhouse.ca/imprints/4H/doubleday-canada

Doubleday Canada is an imprint of the publishing company Penguin Random House Canada. The company used to be known as Forboys. It was incorporated in 1936, and since 1945 it has been known as Doubleday Canada Limited. In 1986 parent company Doubleday was acquired by Bertelsmann. Due to Canadian policy at the time, majority control of Doubleday Canada was sold to Anna Porter. Porter sold her shares to Winnipeg businessman Abraham Simkin in 1991. Random House of Canada, which has just been acquired by Bertelsmann, acquired Doubleday Canada in 1999. In 2013, Random House of Canada and Penguin Canada merged to form Penguin Random House Canada.

== See also ==
- Doubleday (publisher)
