= Josie McFarlane =

Fictional character from the BBC soap opera EastEnders

- EastEnders character
- Portrayed by: Joan Hooley
- Duration: 1998–2000
- First appearance: Episode 1658; 25 August 1998
- Last appearance: Episode 1902; 1 February 2000
- Introduced by: Matthew Robinson
In-universe information
- Occupation: Receptionist
- Sisters: Winnie
- Husband: John McFarlane (backstory)
- Sons: Mick McFarlane
- Adoptive daughters: Kim McFarlane

Josie McFarlane is a fictional character that appeared in the BBC soap opera EastEnders. She was played by Joan Hooley between 25 August 1998 and 1 February 2000. Since leaving the serial, Jamaican-born actress Joan Hooley has publicly accused EastEnders and the BBC of racism and tokenism, for giving her character no significant storylines, and using her as a prop.

== Character creation and development ==
In 1998, EastEnders acquired a new executive producer, Matthew Robinson. Robinson was dubbed "the axeman" in the British press, after a large proportion of the EastEnders cast either quit, or were culled, shortly after Robinson's introduction. Among the departing characters were long-running Asian family the Kapoors, including Sanjay, Gita and Neelam Kapoor. As they were the only Asian characters in the show, EastEnders received criticism for axing them from angry black and Asian MPs, including Oona King, MP for East End constituency Bethnal Green and Dr Ashok Kumar. In response to the criticism, bosses at EastEnders announced the upcoming arrival of various new ethnic minority characters in July 1998. These included, Asian doctor Fred Fonseca, and the Jamaican relatives of Mick McFarlane (Sylvester Williams), including his mother Josie McFarlane.

According to the press report, BBC bosses held a brainstorming session including black and Asian representatives among the writers and cast, to see how they could reflect black and Asian life in London more fully. Josie, played by Joan Hooley, and her stepdaughter Kim, played by Krystle Williams, made their first appearance on-screen in August 1998.

The character Josie has been described as "well-groomed...confident" and someone who "set high — if not impossible — standards, and inevitably people failed her." She had few central storylines of her own, and in November 1999, it was reported that Matthew Robinson was axing the character. According to a report in the Daily Mirror, actress Joan Hooley was called into Robinson's office "and told her services would no longer be required." An insider is quoted as saying, "The writers have been told to start thinking of ways to get rid of Josie. Obviously Joan was shocked, but the powers- that-be just didn't think it was working out." An EastEnders spokeswoman says: "Joan had come to the end of her contract with the programme." The character was written out of the serial after she was threatened with deportation for failing to renew her visa, making her last appearance on-screen in February 2000. Her exit has been described by journalist Danny Buckland as Josie's only decent storyline, but he adds "even this belated plot was unrealistic". Hooley commented, "There was no explanation about the visa problem. Also it is totally implausible that Josie would have gone back to Jamaica without her daughter Kim."

== Storylines ==
Josie arrives in Albert Square in August 1998 to visit her son, Mick McFarlane (Sylvester Williams) whom she believes to be a successful musician. However, Mick's music career failed and he has ended up selling CD's on a market stall in the Square, as well as running the Bridge Street café's night bistro. Josie, who has high aspirations for herself and her family, is not pleased to find out that her son has been lying about his professional status, but Josie also harbours a few secrets of her own. Josie's husband recently died, but before his death he was defrauded in a Jamaican property scam, leaving Josie bankrupt. Josie fosters a young girl named Kim (Krystle Williams), whom she claims is a distant relative of Mick's. Kim is the illegitimate daughter of her philandering husband, and after her mother's death, Josie kindly took her in instead of seeing her go into care. When Mick is finally made privy to this information he is extremely shocked and even more surprised to find out that both Josie and Kim plan to stay in Walford instead of returning to Jamaica. Despite his initial misgivings, Mick soon welcomes his mother and new sister into his home. Josie and Kim later move into number 3c Albert Square, where Josie becomes friendly with her downstairs neighbours, Dot Cotton (June Brown) and Lilly Mattock (Barbara Keogh), although Josie and Dot bicker constantly.

Josie initially gets herself a job as a barmaid at The Queen Victoria public house and she later becomes the receptionist at Fred Fonseca (Jimi Mistry)'s surgery. However, things do not run smoothly for her in her new post. Josie is a strict perfectionist, she also expects perfection from everyone else and she isn't adverse to telling them so either. Her strict mannerisms only seek to frighten away half the patients. She eventually manages to settle down with a lot of coaching from Dr Fonseca, however, yet more problems arise when she discovers that her employer is homosexual. Josie is a strict Christian and she feels that working for a homosexual conflicts with her religious beliefs. She goes as far as to accuse him of coercing Kim into becoming a lesbian. She continues down a path of self-righteousness, judging everyone by her own, impossibly high standards. After she discovers that her son has become involved with ex-prostitute, Nina Harris (Troy Titus Adams), she cannot condone their friendship and her aloof manner towards Nina infuriates Mick. It takes bigoted remarks by racist Jim Branning (John Bardon) to make Josie realise that she is as prejudiced in her own way as he is, but by then it is too late. Having forgotten to renew her visa, she is threatened with deportation and is forced to return to Jamaica, leaving Kim in Mick's care. She promises Kim she will return when she sorts out her visa. Her last appearance is in February 2000.

== Reception ==
Following her departure from the soap in 2000, actress Joan Hooley publicly slammed EastEnders and the BBC for being "racist" and failing to give ethnic minority characters decent storylines, saying that the BBC was doing nothing to challenge TV stereotypes of blacks as "whores, gangsters, pimps and freaks". She said she felt "emotionally abused" after spending 18 months with the show without ever having "any kind of meaningful plotline or meaty dialogue".

She commented, "It was tokenism. I felt like a prop in the corner. It was very demeaning and a form of insidious racism. That is a very strong phrase to use against the BBC and EastEnders but I feel very badly about how they handled my character. They were just fulfilling a duty to have a black face in the show. The way most blacks are often portrayed on television reinforces the image of them as gangsters, pimps, whores and freaks. EastEnders could have helped provide a positive role model but they didn't take the opportunity."

Hooley claims that she was promised major storylines that never materialised, was asked to come up with ideas for black characters, but that all her pages of suggestions (including developing an interesting relationship with the character Dot Cotton or having Josie start her own business) were ignored. She also claims that she was only used for two-thirds of her contracted appearances. She said: "In the 18 months I was in EastEnders, I had no impact. There was nothing that made people sit up and take notice of what Josie was doing. It was like they remembered I was around and threw me a line where I would slide into the bar and say, 'Hello, how are you' and then sit on a stool and say nothing for the rest of the episode. I came to feel that I was letting the black community down because my character was so empty. People of my own colour often accosted me in public and accused me of playing a token black. I was so little-used that they even wrote me cheques for episodes I never appeared in. So why did they not use me? Why are they wasting the taxpayers' money? It was very dispiriting."

She accused the BBC of having an underlying lack of faith in the public's ability to accept that the UK has a multi-racial society, commenting ""The BBC likes to show itself off as being politically correct but I have seen some aspects that are not wholesome, even if it is unintentional. They may not believe it is there and they probably don't intend it to be there, but I have seen this insidious racism at first hand. There are degrees of racism and this, of course, is not the same as insulting or assaulting someone but it is still pretty distasteful. The BBC needs to know there is a degree of dissatisfaction among the public. I think people want to see that EastEnders is populated by many different ethnic groups. Black people in real life run businesses, fall in and out of love, have fascinating and exciting lives. So why can't we in EastEnders. We are not all losers or nobodies so why can't the BBC show that?...I really felt so ineffectual as a character because I had nothing to get my teeth into - there were no great dramatic scenes or relationships. My character was never given anything meaningful to say and that was such a wasted opportunity. My son said I should get out of EastEnders because it wasn't doing me any good as an actress or as a black woman...I have got to speak out so that things can change."
