= Southern Lights: Overexposed =

Studio album by Alex Faith and Dre Murray
- Released: April 28, 2015
- Genre: Christian hip hop
- Length: 39:47
- Label: Collision
- Producer: Swoope, Wit Shahbazian

Alex Faith chronology
ATLast (2013)	Southern Lights: Overexposed (2015)

Dre Murray chronology
Gold Rush: Maybe One Day (2013)	Southern Lights: Overexposed (2015)

Southern Lights: Overexposed is a combined studio album and visual album by Alex Faith and Dre Murray, released the album on April 28, 2015. Faith and Murray worked with Swoope and Wit Shahbazian in the production of this album.

== Critical reception ==
Professional ratings
Review scores
Source	Rating
CCM Magazine	2.5/5 stars
Cross Rhythms	8/10 squares
Jesus Freak Hideout	4.5/5 stars
Indie Vision Music	4/5 stars
New Release Tuesday	4.5/5 stars

Specifying in a two and a half star review by CCM Magazine, Matt Conner realizes, "the hooks aren't as refined and the depth less dynamic than a hip-hop album is allowed to be anymore" Kevin Hoskins, indicating in a four and a half star review from Jesus Freak Hideout, recognizes, "The later parts of the album are mostly solid with just a few missteps, but nothing glaringly bad or skip-worthy." Awarding the album four and a half stars at New Release Tuesday, Dwayne Lacy says, "The album is very southern but also holds strong lyricism, which is a combination that some believe is lacking in the south... These dudes are real." Anthony Peronto, giving the album four stars for Indie Vision Music, writes, "But that doesn't mean there isn't universal appeal in Southern Lights: Overxposed." Indicating in an eight out of ten review at Cross Rhythms, Alan Reid responds, "Collison Records have released some fine hip-hop albums and this earthy, hard-hitting missive is amongst their best."

== Track listing ==
No.	Title	Length
1.	"Overexposed" (featuring Sean C. Johnson)	4:02
2.	"All Around the World" (featuring Tragic Hero)	3:13
3.	"Wake Up Music" (featuring Swoope)	3:13
4.	"I-275" (interlude)	3:17
5.	"Money" (featuring Reconcile)	4:47
6.	"City of Nightmares II" (featuring Ada-L)	3:45
7.	"I-610" (interlude)	3:30
8.	"Decatur Street Blues" (featuring Corey Paul)	4:50
9.	"Forever"	4:04
10.	"Takin' Time" (featuring Young Noah)	5:11
Total length:		39:47

== Charts ==
Chart (2015)	Peak position
US Christian Albums (Billboard)	15
US Independent Albums (Billboard)	23
US Top Rap Albums (Billboard)	22
