= Wake Up (Swoope album) =

Studio album by Swoope
- Released: March 20, 2012
- Genre: Christian hip hop, urban contemporary gospel
- Length: 72:00
- Label: Collision

Swoope chronology
Boys R Us EP (2012)	Wake Up (2012)	Sinema (2014)

Wake Up is the debut studio album from Christian hip hop musician Swoope. The album released on March 20, 2012 by Collision Records.

== Critical reception ==
Professional ratings
Review scores
Source	Rating
Christian Music Zine	5/5 stars
Rapzilla	4.5/5 stars

Wake Up garnered two positive reviews from music critics. At Rapzilla, Nyon Smith rated the album four-and-a-half stars, writing that the release is "a very coherent story from beginning to end." Anthony Peronto of Christian Music Zine rated the album a perfect five stars, stating that "Swoope has crafted a creative, honest, and lyrical album that is definitely deserving of all the recognition it can get."

== Chart performance ==
For the Billboard charting week of April 7, 2012, Wake Up charted at No. 10 and 6 on the Christian Albums and Top Gospel Albums charts, respectively, No. 23 on the Rap Albums, and No. 31 on the Independent Albums chart.

== Track listing ==
Tracklist
No.	Title	Length
1.	"Ideality Prelude"	1:04
2.	"Ideality"	4:02
3.	"Fantasy"	4:07
4.	"Schizo / Hollow dreams interlude" (featuring Tedashii)	6:05
5.	"Blind Eyes [The Good American]" (featuring Christon Gray)	5:00
6.	"Mirage" (featuring Bleecker)	5:08
7.	"Dreamslave / Murder Me prelude" (featuring Christon Gray and Eshon Burgundy)	6:07
8.	"Murder Me / Eulogy interlude"	7:13
9.	"Faith Walk" (featuring Nicole Serrano)	3:55
10.	"Time / Lullaby Prelude"	6:21
11.	"Lullaby"	4:07
12.	"No Imposters" (featuring G. Skinn and Malachi)	4:19
13.	"Aesthetic / Beautiful Rise Prelude" (featuring Christon Gray)	6:58
14.	"The Beautiful Rise" (featuring Sho Baraka)	4:09
15.	"Wlak" (featuring Alex Faith, Christon Gray and Sho Baraka)	3:25
Total length:		72:00

== Charts ==
Chart (2012)	Peak position
US Christian Albums (Billboard)	10
US Top Gospel Albums (Billboard)	6
US Independent Albums (Billboard)	31
US Top Rap Albums (Billboard)	23
