= W.L.A.K. (album) =

Studio album by W.L.A.K.
- Released: March 5, 2013
- Genres: Christian hip hop, Contemporary R&B
- Length: 54:50
- Label: Collision
- Producers: Dirty Rice, Joseph Prielozny, Swoope, Wit

W.L.A.K. is the debut studio album from the Christian hip hop-contemporary R&B music group W.L.A.K. (We Live As Kings). It was released on their own independent label Collision Records on March 5, 2013. The album charted on the Billboard 200 at No. 81, and it was awarded a five star rating by New Release Tuesday and a four star rating from Rapzilla.

== Critical reception ==
Professional ratings
Review scores
Source	Rating
The Christian Manifesto	4.5/5 stars
Christian Music Zine	5/5 stars
Cross Rhythms	8/10 squares
New Release Tuesday	5/5 stars
Rapzilla	4/5 stars

W.L.A.K. garnered critical praise from all five music critics ratings and reviews. At New Release Tuesday, Dwayne Lacy rated the album a perfect five stars, stating how the release had "nice productions" making "The placements of the songs, verses, etc are well put together." Steve Hayes of Cross Rhythms rated the album eight out of ten squares, writing that "The project finely balances soaring quality in production and hooks, yet with a slightly underground vibe at times". At Rapzilla, Timothy Welbeck rated the album four stars out of five, saying that "WLAK is not only a counter cultural rallying cry for disciples of Christ, it is also a grand introduction of Collision Records’ as one of, if not the premier roster, in all of Christian Hip Hop and potentially hip-hop at large." At Christian Music Zine, Anthony Peronto rated the album a perfect five stars, remarking that on an "undeniably excellent" that "The theme is clearly and wonderfully communicated, each artist shines through but came together cohesively, and the record is a fine representation of the record label they come from." The Christian Manifesto rated the album four-and-a-half stars out of five, observing that "While not perfect" the album "is street-smart, savvy, and musically imaginative, the emcees play well off of one another’s strengths, it features a profound theme throughout, boasts solid production and maneuvering, and fills in the gaps where one artist might be lacking."

== Commercial performance ==
For the Billboard charting week of March 23, 2013, W.L.A.K. was the No. 81 most sold album in the entirety of the United States via the Billboard 200, which it was the No. 6 most sold on the Christian Albums chart, and the No. 1 most sold on the Gospel Albums. In addition, it was the No. 7 most sold on the Rap Albums chart, and it was the No. 15 most sold of the Independent Albums.

== Track listing ==
Tracklist
No.	Title	Producer(s)	Length
1.	"Intro" (featuring Allen Swoope and Wit)	Allen Swoope and Wit	2:58
2.	"Imagine" (featuring Alex Faith, Christon Gray, Dre Murray and Swoope)	Swoope and Wit	4:16
3.	"Long Way Down" (featuring Gray and Murray)	Swoope	3:51
4.	"All In" (featuring Faith and Murray)	Dirty Rice and Joseph Prielozny	4:11
5.	"Coward" (featuring Faith and Gray)	Swoope	3:32
6.	"Reign Is Coming" (featuring Gray, Murray and Swoope)	Joseph Prielozny, Swoope and Wit	6:00
7.	"Yhwh" (featuring Murray and Swoope)	Dirty Rice and Swoope	4:40
8.	"Abny (Marty McFly)" (featuring Faith and Swoope)	Dirty Rice, Prielozny and Swoope	3:49
9.	"Broken Kings" (featuring Faith, Gray and Swoope)	Dirty Rice	4:20
10.	"Eyes for You" (featuring Gray)	Swoope	2:32
11.	"W.L.A.Q." (featuring Gray and Swoope)	Swoope	3:33
12.	"Arena" (featuring Gray and Murray)	Wit	5:29
13.	"King in Me" (featuring Gray and Swoope)	Swoope	5:39
Total length:			54:50

== Chart performance ==
Chart (2013)	Peak position
US Billboard 200	81
US Top Christian Albums (Billboard)	6
US Top Gospel Albums (Billboard)	1
US Independent Albums (Billboard)	15
US Top Rap Albums (Billboard)	7
