= At Last (Alex Faith album) =

ATLast

Studio album by Alex Faith
- Released: November 5, 2013
- Genre: Christian hip hop, Contemporary R&B, Urban contemporary gospel
- Length: 48:29
- Label: Collision
- Producer: 42*North, Jacob Cardec, D Flow, Dirty Rice, J.R., Wes Pendleton, Swade, Swoope, Wit, Hothandz Xclusives

Alex Faith chronology
Honest 2 God (2012)	ATLast (2013)	Bloodlines (2015)

ATLast is the debut studio album from Christian hip hop musician Alex Faith. The album released on November 5, 2013 by Collision Records to select retailers such as iTunes and November 19, 2013 to all retailers. It charted on the Billboard 200 at No. 193.

== Critical reception ==
Professional ratings
Review scores
Source	Rating
The Christian Manifesto	4/5 stars
Christian Music Zine	4.5/5 stars
Cross Rhythms	10/10 squares
Jesus Freak Hideout	3.5/5 stars
New Release Tuesday	4/5 stars
Rapzilla	3.5/5 stars

ATLast garnered praise from the ratings and reviews of six music critics. Tony Cummings of Cross Rhythms rated the album a perfect ten squares, writing that "Alex said in an interview recently, 'Everyone goes through life trying to get somewhere. This destination we all have to arrive at is always and ultimately going to be at the feet of Jesus'", which the release "makes this point crystal clear". At Rapzilla, Nyon Smith rated the album three-and-a-half stars, stating that "ATLast is a standout in CHH, but after a while I began to feel that this should be the norm rather than the exception if the genre is to progress in its search for mainstream assimilation." Kevin Hoskins of Jesus Freak Hideout rated the album three-and-a-half stars, saying that "there are more positives than negatives to ATLast, so most will enjoy spinning this." At New Release Tuesday, Mark Ryan rated the album four stars, writing that he was "impressed" on a release which "is complete in every sense of the word." Anthony Peronto of Christian Music Zine rated the album four-and-a-half stars, stating that this is "authentic, honest, and creative hip hop and Alex Faith has delivered that substantially with ATLast." At The Christian Manifesto, Michael Wildes rated the album four stars, saying that "this is a solid release from Alex Faith and Collision Records on a whole."

== Chart performance ==
For the Billboard charting week of November 23, 2013, ATLast charted at No. 193 on the Billboard 200, No. 12 and 4 on the Christian Albums and Top Gospel Albums charts, respectively, No. 16 on the Rap Albums, and No. 27 on the Independent Albums chart.

== Track listing ==
Tracklist
No.	Title	Writer(s)	Producer(s)	Length
1.	"ATFirst" ((featuring Christon Gray- uncredited))	Stephen Faith, Christon Gray, Allen Swoope & Elvin "Wit" Shahbazian	Swoope and Wit	2:58
2.	"City of Nightmares" (featuring Tragic Hero)	S. Faith, Mario Torres, Jacob Cardec	Jacob Cardec	4:23
3.	"Light Up" (featuring Trip Lee)	S. Faith, William Barefield III, E. Shahbazian	Wit	3:32
4.	"Hold Me Down" (featuring Christon Gray)	S. Faith, Christon Gray, Courtney Peebles	J.R.	3:51
5.	"Refuge (Interlude)" (featuring Odd Thomas)	Odd Thomas, S. Faith, A. Swoope, E. Shahbazian	Swoope and Wit	2:18
6.	"Bloodlines" (featuring J.R.)	S. Faith, C. Peebles, Wes Pendelton, E. Shahbazian	Wes Pendleton and Wit	4:00
7.	"Letting Me Go"	S. Faith, Swade, E. Shahbazian	Swade and Wit	4:37
8.	"Runaway" (featuring Andy Mineo)	S. Faith, Andy Mineo, A. Swoope, E. Shahbazian	Hothandz Xclusives, Swoope and Wit	4:18
9.	"Pull Up" (featuring Tedashii and Corey Paul)	S. Faith, Tedashii Anderson, Corey Davis, Swade, E. Shahbazian	Swade and Wit	4:27
10.	"Never Giving Up" (featuring Social Club)	S. Faith, Martin Santiago, Fernando Miranda, Abraham Olaleye	D Flow	4:54
11.	"Refuge" (featuring JGivens and Dre Murray)	S. Faith, Jeremiah Givens, Andre Murray, A. Swoope, E. Shahbazian	Swoope and Wit	3:48
12.	"ATLast" (featuring Christon Gray)	S. Faith, C. Gray, A. Swoope, E. Shahbazian	Swoope and Wit	5:23
Total length:				48:29

Digital download bonus track
No.	Title	Writer(s)	Producer(s)	Length
13.	"The Morning" (featuring Wes Pendleton)	S. Faith, W. Pendelton, Joel McNeil, John McNeil	42*North	3:19
Total length:				51:48

CD bonus tracks
No.	Title	Producer(s)	Length
13.	"Everywhere (Remix)"	Dirty Rice
14.	"Honest 2 God (42*North Remix)"	42*North

== Charts ==
Chart (2013)	Peak position
US Billboard 200	193
US Top Christian Albums (Billboard)	12
US Top Gospel Albums (Billboard)	4
US Independent Albums (Billboard)	27
US Top Rap Albums (Billboard)	16
