= Bloodline (disambiguation) =

Bloodline most commonly refers to heredity.

Bloodline, bloodlines, blood line or blood lines may also refer to:

== Arts, entertainment, and media ==
=== Comics ===
- Bloodlines (comics), a 1993 DC Comics crossover
- Colossus: Bloodline, a 2006 Marvel Comics miniseries about the X-Man Colossus
- Bloodlines, a 2004 issue of the Star Wars: Republic comic book series
- Bloodlines, a 2007 collection of Hellblazer stories written by Garth Ennis
- Bloodline (character), the alias of Brielle Brooks, the daughter of Blade

=== Films ===
- Bloodline (1963 film), a Korean film, based on a 1948 play
- Bloodline (1979 film), based on Sidney Sheldon's novel (see below), directed by Terence Young
- Bloodline (2008 film), a documentary film by Bruce Burgess
- Bloodline (2011 film), by Matt Thompson
- Bloodline (2018 film), a horror/thriller film by Henry Jacobson
- Bloodlines, a 2004 film starring Rudolf Martin
- Blood Lines (film), a 2025 Canadian romantic drama film
- Hellraiser: Bloodline, a 1996 horror film in the Hellraiser film series
- Wrong Turn 5: Bloodlines, a 2012 horror film in the Wrong Turn film series
- Day of the Dead: Bloodline, a 2018 horror film in the Day of the Dead reboot film series
- Pet Sematary: Bloodlines, a 2023 horror film in the Pet Sematary film series
- Final Destination Bloodlines, a 2025 horror film in the Final Destination film series

=== Games ===
- Assassin's Creed: Bloodlines, a 2009 PSP game set after the first Assassin's Creed game
- Castlevania: Bloodlines, a 1994 Castlevania video game
- Vampire: The Masquerade – Bloodlines, a 2004 computer game based on the World of Darkness setting by White Wolf
- Blood Lines, a 1999 PlayStation game developed by Radical Entertainment
- Bloodline, a version of the Blood Gulch multiplayer map in Halo: The Master Chief Collection

=== Literature ===
- Blood Line, a 2011 novel by Lynda La Plante
- Blood Lines (short story collection), a 1995 collection by Ruth Rendell
- Blood Lines (Wilks novel), a 2007 World of the Lupi novel by Eileen Wilks
- Blood Lines, a 1992 novel by Tanya Huff
- Blood Lines, a 2016 novel by Angela Marsons
- Bloodline (Cary novel), a 2005 unofficial sequel to Bram Stoker's Dracula, by Kate Cary
- Bloodline (Sheldon novel), 1977, by Sidney Sheldon
- Bloodline (Wilson novel), a 2007 sci-fi novel by F. Paul Wilson
- Bloodline, a 1999 play co-written and -produced by Dmitry Chepovetsky
- Bloodline, a 2004 novel by Kevin Brooks
- Bloodline (Rollins novel), 2012, by James Rollins
- Bloodlines (Deathlands novel), a 1995 Deathlands novel
- Bloodlines (book series), by Richelle Mead
  - Bloodlines (Mead novel), 2011
- Bloodlines (Star Wars novel), a 2006 novel by Karen Traviss in the Legacy of the Force series
- Bloodlines, a 2000 novel by Fred D'Aguiar
- Bloodlines, a 2005 novel by Jan Burke
- Bloodlines: The Story of Urza's Destiny, a 1999 novel in the Artifacts Cycle by Loren Coleman
- Star Wars: Bloodline, 2016 novel by Claudia Gray
- The Blood Line, a poem included in The Fire Step by Tom French
- Blood Lines, 2023 novel by Nelson DeMille and Alex DeMille

=== Music ===
==== Groups and labels ====
- Bloodline (band), an American blues rock band
- Bloodline, the name of Kenny Rogers backing band since 1976
- Bloodline Records, an American hip hop label founded by DMX
- The Bloodline, an American metalcore band, currently known as Dirge Within

==== Albums ====
- Bloodline (Glen Campbell album), 1976
- Bloodline (Kenny Neal album), 2016
- Bloodline (LeVert album), 1986
- Bloodline (Recoil album), 1992
- Bloodlines (Alex Faith album), 2015
- Bloodlines (Howl album), 2013
- Bloodlines (Midnight Syndicate album), 2021
- Bloodlines (Terry Allen album), 1983; reissued on Smokin' the Dummy/Bloodlines compilation
- Bloodlines, by Kev Carmody, 1993

==== Songs ====
- "Bloodline" (Alex Warren and Jelly Roll song), 2025
- "Bloodline" (Ariana Grande song), 2019
- "Bloodline", by Astrid S from Joyride, 2024
- "Bloodline", by Bury Tomorrow from Earthbound, 2016
- "Bloodline", by Crown the Empire from The Resistance: Rise of The Runaways, 2014
- "Bloodline", by Kaleo, 2025
- "Bloodline", by Luke Hemmings from When Facing the Things We Turn Away From, 2021
- "Bloodline", by Northlane from Alien, 2019
- "Bloodline", by Roam from Backbone, 2016
- "Bloodline", by Slayer from God Hates Us All, 2001
- "Bloodlines", by Dethklok from Dethalbum II, 2009
- "Bloodlines", by Tim and the Glory Boys, 2021
- "Blood Lines", by Sleeping with Sirens from How It Feels to Be Lost, 2019

=== Television ===
==== Series ====
- Bloodline (TV series), a 2015 Netflix thriller-drama series
- Bloodlines (ITV drama), a 2005 two-episode British detective fiction thriller
- The Challenge: Battle of the Bloodlines, season 27 of the MTV reality game show

==== Episodes ====
- "Bloodline" (CSI: Miami)
- "Bloodline" (ER)
- "Bloodline" (Fringe)
- "Bloodlines" (All Saints)
- "Bloodlines" (Blade: The Series)
- "Bloodlines" (CSI: Crime Scene Investigation)
- "Bloodlines" (Murdoch Mysteries)
- "Bloodlines" (Revival)
- "Bloodlines" (Silent Witness)
- "Bloodlines" (Star Trek: The Next Generation)
- "Bloodlines" (Stargate SG-1)
- "Bloodlines" (The Vampire Diaries)
- "Bloodlines" (Voltron: Legendary Defender)
- "Bloodlines" (X-Men)
- "Blood Lines" (Lost Girl)
- "The Blood Line" (Torchwood)

== Sports ==
- The Bloodline, a professional wrestling stable in WWE

== See also ==
- Red Line (disambiguation)
