= Sinema (album) =

Studio album by Swoope
- Released: August 5, 2014
- Genre: Christian hip hop, urban contemporary gospel
- Length: 53:28
- Label: Collision

Swoope chronology
Wake Up (2012)	Sinema (2014)	Sonshine (2018)

Sinema is the second studio album by the Christian hip hop musician Swoope, released on August 5, 2014, by Collision Records. It is a follow-up to Wake Up. Highly praised by critics, the album reached No. 3 on the U.S. Christian Albums chart, No. 1 on the Gospel chart, and No. 4 on the Rap Albums chart.

== Critical reception ==
Professional ratings
Review scores
Source	Rating
The Christian Manifesto	4.5/5 stars
The Christian Post	8/10
Cross Rhythms	10/10 squares
Indie Vision Music	5/5 stars
Jesus Freak Hideout	5/5 stars
New Release Tuesday	4/5 stars

Sinema met with critical acclaim. On behalf of Jesus Freak Hideout, Mark Rice gave the album a full five stars, writing that "...if there is any justice in the world, Sinema will mark the big break for both Swoope and Collision Records thanks to it being one of the best hip hop albums released in recent memory". Jeffery Scott of The Christian Post also scored the album favorably, giving it eight out of ten and writing, "From top to bottom, it is a solid effort in storytelling and conveying the struggle all believers have with sin." Writing for Rapzilla, Nyon Smith considered the album a worthwhile listen, as it asks hard questions that cause the listener to examine themselves as to what selfish desires they hold, but qualified that overall, he considers Swoope's previous album, Wake Up, as a whole, a better album than Sinema.

Dwayne Lacy of New Release Tuesday gave the album four stars out of five, concluding, "The album requires a dedicated listen from start to finish to get the concept, and if you do that, it will be an enriching experience." Indie Vision Music's Anthony Peronto gave the album a perfect score, cwriting, "It may take a few spins to recognize it, but Sinema may be Swoope’s true magnum opus. For now it remains the defining artistic statement of the Christian’s struggle with sin. And so far, most likely the best full-length hip hop album of 2014. I give it two thumbs up!" On behalf of Cross Rhythms, Steve Hayes rated the album a full ten squares and described it as an ambitious concept album. Calvin Moore of The Christian Manifesto rated the album four-and-a-half stars out of five, and noted that while the lyrical material is not easy listening, Sinema is still an excellent project, and though Swoope sounds very similar to Kanye West, he is "coming into his own".

== Commercial performance ==
For the Billboard charting week of August 23, 2014, Sinema charted at No. 3 on the Christian Albums and No. 1 on the Top Gospel Albums charts, No. 4 on the Rap Albums, and No. 6 on the Independent Albums chart. It also hit number 55 on the Billboard 200.

== Track listing ==
No.	Title	Length
1.	"Sinema"	3:52
2.	"On My Mind" (featuring Courtney Orlando)	3:10
3.	"TGC 2" (featuring Sho Baraka)	4:08
4.	"#SameTeam" (featuring Tedashii, Yaves, Dre Murray, JGivens, and John Givez)	7:02
5.	"LSD" (featuring Christon Gray)	5:13
6.	"Bow Down" (featuring Tragic Hero)	3:04
7.	"Best of Me" (featuring Natalie Lauren)	4:16
8.	"Right Side"	4:06
9.	"Beauty and the Beast"	3:30
10.	"Before Goodnight"	4:58
11.	"Sin in Me"	4:47
12.	"Fix My Heart" (featuring Denise Powell and Propaganda)	5:21
Total length:		53:28

== Charts ==
Chart (2014)	Peak position
US Billboard 200	55
US Christian Albums (Billboard)	3
US Top Gospel Albums (Billboard)	1
US Independent Albums (Billboard)	6
US Top Rap Albums (Billboard)	4
