= Taylor Gray =

Taylor Gray may refer to:

- Taylor Gray (racing driver), American stock car racing driver, born in 2005
- Taylor Gray (actor), American actor, born in 1993
- Taylor Gray (soccer), American soccer player, born in 1998

== See also ==
- Taelor Gray, American Christian hip hop musician, born in 1984
