= Wolf to the Slaughter =

1967 novel by Ruth Rendell

- First edition (UK)
- Author: Ruth Rendell
- Language: English
- Series: Inspector Wexford #3
- Genre: Crime / Mystery novel
- Publisher: John Long Ltd UK; The Crime Club (US)
- Publication date: 1967
- Publication place: United Kingdom
- Media type: Print (Hardcover, Paperback)
- Pages: 184 pp
- ISBN: 0-09-084850-0
- OCLC: 457673
- LC Class: PZ4.R4132 Wo PR6068.E63
- Preceded by: A New Lease of Death
- Followed by: The Best Man to Die

Wolf to the Slaughter is a novel by British crime-writer Ruth Rendell, first published in 1967. It is the third book in the popular Inspector Wexford series. A mini-series adapted from the novel was produced by Television South in 1987.
