= The Best Man to Die =

Novel by Ruth Rendell

- Author: Ruth Rendell
- Language: English
- Series: Inspector Wexford #4
- Genre: Crime novel
- Publisher: John Long Ltd (UK); The Crime Club (US)
- Publication date: June 1969
- Publication place: United Kingdom
- Media type: Print (Hardback & Paperback)
- ISBN: 0-09-097530-8
- OCLC: 71838
- Dewey Decimal: 823/.9/14
- LC Class: PZ4.R4132 Be PR6068.E63
- Preceded by: Wolf to the Slaughter
- Followed by: A Guilty Thing Surprised

The Best Man to Die is a novel by British crime-writer Ruth Rendell. it was first published in 1969 and is the 4th entry in her popular Inspector Wexford series.

== Reception ==
Shirley Graves of the Daily Independent Journal wrote: "Published for the Crime Club, this is enjoyable reading and presents a challenging puzzle. The characterization is exceptional." Alfred Apsler of the Oregon Daily Journal called the novel a "pleasant, readable job done with skill and insight", praising the characterisation and the "sensitive, at times near-poetic style of writing" while criticising the pacing. The Irish Independent opined: "In a taut, baffling story, Mrs. Rendell again gives proof of her skill as an observer and as master of crisp dialogue and good characterisation.
