= Heredity (disambiguation) =

Heredity may refer to:

- Heredity: the transfer of characteristics from parent to offspring
- Inheritance: the hereditary transfer of titles, property, or assets from parent to offspring (or other beneficiary)
- A synonym for bloodline; for other uses of the term, see Bloodline (disambiguation)
- Hereditary property, in mathematics, a property of objects inherited by all their subobjects
- Heredity (journal), a scientific journal
- "Heredity" (short story), a science fiction story by Isaac Asimov
- Heredity (film), a 1912 film starring Harry Carey
- Hereditary (film), a 2018 film starring Toni Collette
- Heredity (album), a 1985 album by Rational Youth
