= From Doon with Death =

1964 novel by Ruth Rendell

From Doon With Death
- First edition (UK)
- Author: Ruth Rendell
- Language: English
- Series: Inspector Wexford #1
- Genre: Crime / Mystery novel
- Publisher: John Long Ltd (UK); The Crime Club (US)
- Publication date: 1964
- Publication place: United Kingdom
- Media type: Print (Hardcover, Paperback)
- Pages: 182 pp (Arrow edition)
- ISBN: 0-09-920350-2 (Arrow edition)
- OCLC: 16605281
- Followed by: A New Lease of Death

From Doon with Death was the debut novel of British writer Ruth Rendell, first published in 1964. The story was later made into a movie in 1988. The novel introduced her popular recurring character Inspector Wexford, who went on to feature in 24 of her novels.

== Criticism and context ==
Although the identity of the victim's lover "Doon" would not be much of a surprise to the 21st century reader, at the time of its release it was considered ground-breaking and daring, and this novel immediately garnered Rendell international critical attention.
