= A New Lease of Death =

1967 novel by Ruth Rendell

- Author: Ruth Rendell
- Language: English
- Series: Inspector Wexford #2
- Genre: Crime novel
- Publisher: John Long Ltd (UK); The Crime Club (US)
- Publication date: 1967
- Publication place: United Kingdom
- Media type: Print (Hardcover)
- Preceded by: From Doon with Death
- Followed by: Wolf to the Slaughter

A New Lease of Death is a novel by British writer Ruth Rendell, first published in 1967. It is the second entry in her popular Inspector Wexford series. The novel was re-titled Sins of the Fathers in the United States for its initial paperback release.

== Reception ==
Albert Edwards of the Ledger-Enquirer opined: "Well-written and with an abundance of suspense, "A New Lease of Death" rates an A plus for the author." The Buffalo News called it a "slow English gambit at its whodunit best." Pattie Lambert of the Rocky Mount Telegram wrote: "The plot is well-drawn, the reader's understanding is hampered by a profusion of characters — several juvenile delinquents in particular — who are not all distinctly sketched."
