= List of Nippon Professional Baseball players (P) =

The following is a list of Nippon Professional Baseball players with the last name starting with P, retired or active.

== P ==
Name	Debut	Final game	Position	Teams	Ref
José Parra			Pitcher	Yomiuri Giants, Orix Buffaloes	
Reinoso Pascual			Pitcher	Hiroshima Toyo Carp	
Valentino Pascucci			Outfielder	Chiba Lotte Marines	
Corey Paul			Outfielder	Seibu Lions	
Rodney Pedraza			Pitcher	Fukuoka Daiei Hawks, Yomiuri Giants	
Rudy Pemberton			Outfielder	Seibu Lions	
Felix Perdomo			Pitcher	Hiroshima Toyo Carp	
Eduardo Pérez			Outfielder	Hanshin Tigers	
Robert Perez			Outfielder	Orix BlueWave	
Timoniel Pérez			Outfielder	Hiroshima Toyo Carp	
Roberto Petagine			Infielder	Yakult Swallows, Yomiuri Giants, Fukuoka SoftBank Hawks	
Jason Phillips			Pitcher	Orix BlueWave	
Greg Pirkl			Infielder	Fukuoka Daiei Hawks	
Lou Pote			Pitcher	Hanshin Tigers	
Alonzo Powell			Outfielder	Chunichi Dragons	
Dennis Powell			Pitcher	Kintetsu Buffaloes	
Jeremy Powell			Pitcher	Osaka Kintetsu Buffaloes, Orix Buffaloes, Yomiuri Giants	
Arquimedez Pozo			Infielder	Yokohama BayStars	
Carlos Pulido			Pitcher	Orix BlueWave	
Harvey Pulliam			Outfielder	Orix BlueWave	
