= The Glory Album =

Studio album by Christon Gray
- Released: March 11, 2016
- Genres: Soul, urban contemporary gospel, Christian R&B, Christian hip hop, contemporary R&B, neo soul
- Length: 46:44
- Labels: RCA, Fo Yo Soul

Christon Gray chronology
School of Roses (2014)	The Glory Album (2016)

The Glory Album is the third studio album by Christon Gray. RCA alongside Fo Yo Soul Records released the album on March 11, 2016.

It was produced by Gray, Max Stark, Marlo Scott, Jonathan Baker, Wit, GiAngelo Power, among others. Collaboration include Kirk Franklin, Skyzoo, and Taelor Gray. The executive producers were Chris Shaban, Ron Hill, Kirk Franklin and Monica Coates.

The album charted at #5 on the Billboard R&B chart and is lauded for crossing over into the mainstream while maintaining a clear Jesus message. It is a digital only release.

== Background ==
In March 2015, Gray began to release singles via SoundCloud, prompting fans to wonder if he was still signed to Collision Records. In an open letter via christongray.com on April 4, 2015, he informed the world that he was indeed a free agent and was working on new material. It would turn out that two of those songs, "Open Door (See You Later)" and "Afraid With You" would make the album.

On June 20, 2015, Kirk Franklin announced via video live from the main stage at Alive Fest in Ohio that Gray had been signed to his RCA/Sony imprint, Fo Yo Soul, and then introduced Christon's performance.

One month later in an update on his website he confirmed that Franklin and FYS President Ron Hill had approved eight songs already for an upcoming, yet to be named album. It was later revealed that all eight of those songs made the final album include "Connor McDees", "Blackmail (Black Male)" and "50 Shades".

It was in that same visit to Dallas that Gray and Shaban were first introduced to producer Max Stark. Gray says that the first beat that Stark played them would become "Stop Me". That meeting is documented as ambient vocals in the background at the end of "50 Shades". Christon was recording a voice memo with Kirk in the studio just goofing around building a track. He did not turn it off and it captured the meeting with Stark as well as Shaban and Gray laying out the initial marketing plan behind the "Connor McDees" video.

On July 29, 2015, Gray, Stark, Shaban, Scott and Baker got together at The Flutter in Columbus OH to begin the final construction of the album. In that four-day session they completed "Ft. Knox", "Stop Me", "My Love is Real" and the second half of "50 Shades".

Over the next few weeks, Stark would take home the instrumentals to "Connor McDees", "50 Shades", "Nowhere" and "My Love is Real" to add elements as a co-producer. The album credits later show Stark as the primary producer on "Nowhere".

After receiving no marketing plan with two months to go, Tom Drawer decided to delay the album's original October release. Gray and Shaban went back in the studio to "tighten up some songs, maybe add one or two newbees". It is believed those songs were "The Glory Pt. I", "No. 51 (The Glory Pt II)" and "Follow You", with production credits to Gray/Baker, Gray/Scott, and Stark/Gray/Baker respectively.

A discussion with RCA radio staff encouraged Gray to add "Open Door (See You Later)" to the album's final track listing.

In early November 2015 Gray had announced that the album was complete and "in the hands of the record label."

== Release and reception ==
The Glory Album was officially released on Friday March 11, 2016.

The album's first single, "Connor McDees" was debuted on VEVO on December 17, 2015.

The album's second single, "Open Door (See You Later)", was serviced to Urban radio mixshows and Gospel radio by RCA in late February 2016. It was picked up by Apple Music for their ‘Best of the Week’ playlist. The track, along with "Stop Me" and "The Glory Part I", were played on ESPN programming throughout March with Gray being an ‘Artist of the Month’.

The album's third single, "Ft. Knox" was released as a free download with pre-order in February 2016 and was also quickly added to Apple Music's ‘Best of the Week’ playlist.

The album's fourth single, "Stop Me", is the most successful single to date. It has appeared on commercials for Warner Bros Rampage movie and HBO's Ballers, both starring The Rock. It was also used FOX's Lethal Weapon and Honda's #AnotherMilestone Civic Coupe ad. It was the theme song to EA Sports Madden '19 playing as the intro. It was also used by ESPN, the ESPY Awards, FOX Sports Premier League, Roc Nation Sports and more. In January 2020, it was again licensed to promote ABC's upcoming TV Drama, For Life.

Awarding the album five stars from New Release Today, Mark Ryan states, "Christon Gray has crafted together an incredible piece of art that will touch each area of the soul. It rips it apart and heals it. It shows versatility and vulnerability. With The Glory Album, Christon Gray takes himself from the underground of Christian music to the front lines. Daniel Cody, reviewing the album at Wade-O Radio, writes, "The Glory Album is a quality project. Each song is strong enough to stand on its own, so you wouldn't have to listen to the album in succession to enjoy it. This isn't some earth-shattering, ground-breaking project from him, but if you're looking for that every single time an album comes out, you will always leave disappointed." Giving the album four and a half stars for Jesus Freak Hideout, Kevin Hoskins describes, "this album is nearly perfect. Christon Gray delivers the entire package of that smooth R&B sound with hip hop blending in, while tossing in some contemporary tunes for many fans to enjoy." Chris Major, rating the album four and a half stars by The Christian Beat, says, "With every song written from different places in his life and artistry, this collection emphasizes both the struggles and triumphs of a life in Christ with a refreshing vulnerability. Artistically crafted and well-delivered, The Glory Album earns its prominent place in Christian rap." Scoring the album a perfect 5-stars, EJ Gaines of The Gospel Pundit writes, "The 13-track album, co-written in its entirety by Gray, is a cohesive masterpiece, moving seamlessly from authentic, transparent vocals to playful and clever lyricism, all set to well-produced instrumentals…with The Glory Album, Christon Gray delivers a musical gem, masterfully blending R&B and hip-hop, all to the glory of God."

It was nominated for a number of awards including 'Rap/Hip-Hop Gospel CD of the Year' at the 2017 Stellar Awards.

Track listing

No.	Title	Length
1.	"The Glory Album, Pt. 1"	2:18
2.	"Stop Me"	3:28
3.	"Fort Knox"	3:06
4.	"Afraid with You"	3:31
5.	"50 Shades"	6:24
6.	"Connor McDees (feat. Skyzoo & Taelor Gray)"	3:12
7.	"No. 51 (The Glory, Pt. 2)"	4:02
8.	"Open Door (See You Later)"	4:16
9.	"My Love Is Real"	3:14
10.	"Nowhere"	3:50
11.	"Black Male (Blackmail) (Interlude)"	1:54
12.	"Black Male (Blackmail) (feat. Lauren Heatherly)"	4:03
13.	"Follow You"	3:26
Total length:		46:44

Track 1: Written by: Christon Gray & Chris Shaban. Produced by Gray. Co-Produced by Jonathan Baker

Track 2: Written by: Gray & Shaban. Produced by Max Stark

Track 3: Written by Gray, Shaban, Baker & Marlo Scott. Produced by Stark

Track 4^: Written by Gray, Shaban & Eric Bradley. Produced by Gray

Track 5: Written by Gray, Shaban & Baker. Produced by Wit & 42 North; Gray

Track 6: Written by Gray, Taelor Gray & Gregory Skyler. Produced by: Joel St. John. Co-Produced by: Jaden Chada, Scott & Stark

Track 7: Written by Gray, Shaban, Baker, Kameron Bray & Eric Bradley. Produced by Gray & Scott

Track 8*^: Written by Gray, Shaban, Kelly Shahbazian & Mario Torres. Produced by Wit. Co-Produced by Chada

Track 9: Written by Gray & Shaban. Produced by Gray & Scott. Co-Produced by Stark

Track 10: Written by Gray, Shaban, Scott, Jeremy Castro & Amante Lacey. Produced by Stark. Co-Produced by Gray & Matt Shaban

Track 11: Written by Gray, Shaban & Scott. Produced by Gray & Stark

Track 12: Written by Gray, Shaban, Baker & Bradley. Produced by Gray

Track 13: Written by Gray, Shaban & Baker. Produced by Gray & Baker. Co-Produced by Stark

All Songs Recorded at The Flutter in Columbus OH (except where noted)

*Recorded at IQwit Studios in Claymont, DE

All Songs Mixed by Max Stark at 25th Street Recording in Oakland, CA & Sandbox Studios in Toronto ON (except where noted)

^Mixed at IQwit Studios in Claymont, DE

All Songs Mastered by Herb Powers for Powers Mastering Inc., Florida

== Chart performance ==
Billboard Chart (2016)	Peak position
US Top R&B Albums (Billboard)	5
US R&B Album Sales	5
US Christian Albums (Billboard)	6
US TopR&B/Hip Hop Albums (Billboard)	14
US Top Digital Albums	22
US Top Album Sales (Billboard)	64
