= W.L.A.K. =

American hip hop group

- Also known as: We Live As Kings or WLAK
- Origin: United States
- Genres: Christian hip hop, Contemporary R&B
- Years active: 2011–present
- Label: Collision
- Members: Alex Faith; Corey Paul; Dre Murray; Ki'shon Furlow
- Past members: Christon Gray; Swoope
- Website: we-kings.com

W.L.A.K. also known as We Live As Kings or WLAK is a Christian hip hop and Contemporary R&B music group from the United States that started in 2011. It released its eponymously titled debut album in 2013.

== Background ==
W.L.A.K. or We Live As Kings is music group that currently consists of Alex Faith, Corey Paul, Dre Murray, and Ki'shon Furlow. They formed 2011, when they started Collision Records together as a collective. The group was founded by Christon Gray, Alex Faith, Dre Murray, and Swoope, but Gray left in 2015 and was replaced by Corey Paul. Swoope was later replaced by Ki'shon Furlow.

== Music history ==
The group release their debut album on March 5, 2013, through Collision Records, which it was the eponymously-titled W.L.A.K.. The album charted on numerous Billboard charts on March 23, 2013. It was the No. 81 most sold album in the entirety of the United States via the Billboard 200, which it was the No. 6 most sold on the Christian Albums chart, and the No. 1 most sold on the Gospel Albums. In addition, it was the No. 7 most sold on the Rap Albums chart, and it was the No. 15 most sold of the Independent Albums.

== Discography ==
Studio albums

List of studio albums, with selected chart positions
Title	Album details	Peak chart positions				
Title	Album details	US 200	US CHR	US GOS	US IND	US RAP
W.L.A.K.	Released: April 29, 2013; Label: Collision; CD, digital download	81	6	1	15	7
