= A Sleeping Life =

Novel by Ruth Rendell

- First edition hardcover
- Author: Ruth Rendell
- Language: English
- Series: Inspector Wexford #10
- Genre: Crime novel
- Publisher: Hutchinson (UK); Doubleday (US)
- Publication date: 8 May 1978
- Publication place: United Kingdom
- Media type: Print (Hardcover & Paperback)
- ISBN: 0-09-132540-4
- OCLC: 4068236
- Dewey Decimal: 823/.9/14
- LC Class: PZ4.R4132 Sl 1978b PR6068.E63
- Preceded by: Shake Hands Forever
- Followed by: Put on By Cunning

A Sleeping Life is a crime-novel by British writer Ruth Rendell, first published in 1978. It features her popular investigator Detective Inspector Wexford, and is the tenth novel in the series.

A Sleeping Life was a finalist for the 1979 Edgar Allan Poe Award for Best Novel. It was one of two Inspector Wexford novels to have been shortlisted for either of the "big two" crime-fiction awards, the Edgar or the CWA Gold Dagger. An Unkindness of Ravens was also nominated in 1986.

== Reception ==
In a starred review, Kirkus Reviews wrote, "When Rendell writes crime-from-the-criminal-point-of-view, she is gripping and creepy. When she writes straightforward detection starring homely, countryish Inspector Wexford, she is even better".
