= School of Roses =

Studio album by Christon Gray
- Released: March 25, 2014
- Genre: R&B, Soul,
- Length: 54:55
- Label: Collision

Christon Gray chronology
Even with Evil with Me (2011)	School of Roses (2014)	The Glory Album (2016)

School of Roses is the second studio album from singer/rapper Christon Gray. It was released on March 25, 2014 by Collision Records. It charted on the Billboard 200 at #44 and #5 on R&B Albums.

== Background ==
The 2nd studio album from singer/rapper Christon Gray is entitled School of Roses, which was released on March 25, 2014 by Collision Records and currently distributed by Tom Drawer.

Recorded in late 2013 between The Flutter in Columbus and I Qwit Studios in Claymont, DE, the album was intended to be more R&B influenced than his previous mixtape, BodyArt, which was a straight Hip-Hop album. The album was overseen by Collision Records A&R Wit who, along with Gray, Swoope, Wes Pendleton & B Reith, handled the album's production.

At this time, Christon had established himself as the go-to guy for hooks in CHH. Artists like Lecrae, Andy Mineo, KB, Trip Lee, Da T.R.U.T.H., Tedashii and many more were featuring him on every release. It was that, combined with what was described as a ‘lack of quality R&B music’, that led to the style of School of Roses.

The album was completed and turned into the label in January 2014.

In a Google Hangout interview following his release, Christon reveals many secrets about the album. "You'll never find a rose in the album art," he says. The red line on the cover art, Christon explains, signifies the hip-hop element (the line meaning a bar, a term used in hip-hop) that resonates in the album, despite it being heavily R&B and Ballad-based. He explains the meaning of the album title as well, stating that it is an album about growing up, specifically with love and relationships. He describes the album as not one that is transparent, but translucent.

== Critical reception ==
Professional ratings
Review scores
Source	Rating
Christian Music Zine	4.5/5 stars
Jesus Freak Hideout	3.5/5 stars
New Release Tuesday	4.5/5 stars

School of Roses met with generally positive reception from music critics. Billboard Magazine wrote a review entitled "Christon Gray ‘Schools’ Charts". Amongst its many high chart placements listed below, Gray, with his hit single, 'Wanna' also reached #21 on the Billboard Twitter Emerging Artists Chart. At New Release Tuesday, Dwayne Lacy rated the album four-and-a-half stars, stating that it is a "Great album musically and powerful album as far as substance." Anthony Peronto of Christian Music Zine rated the album four-and-a-half stars, writing that "School Of Roses is a game changer for Christian R&B." This also led to numerous publications wanting to find out about this Christian artist that was telling love stories to the mainstream including Jet, Soul Train, Essence, BET and more.

== Chart performance ==
For the Billboard charting week of April 12, 2014, School of Roses charted at #44 on the Billboard 200, #5 on the R&B Albums, and #9 on the Independent Albums & Top R&B/Hip Hop Albums chart.

It also charted Billboard’s ‘Top Album Sales #44’ and ‘Top Digital Albums #13’.

== Track listing ==
Tracklist
No.	Title	Length
1.	"The Last Time"	1:39
2.	"Wanna" (featuring JGivens)	4:27
3.	"Windchaser"	3:19
4.	"Vanish" (featuring Swoope)	3:40
5.	"Roses 101-After All"	3:12
6.	"Hello or Goodbye"	4:16
7.	"Moving On"	2:59
8.	"Convenient" (featuring Wes Pendleton)	4:03
9.	"Super Dave"	3:04
10.	"Roses 102-Burning House"	5:21
11.	"Nostalgious" (featuring Taelor Gray & B. Reith)	6:11
12.	"Lady Gray (Easy to Love)"	3:51
13.	"Roses 103-Ghost"	3:43
14.	"Arena (The Final Hour)"	5:10
Total length:		54:55

== Charts ==
Chart (2014)	Peak position
US R&B Albums (Billboard)	5
US R&B Album Sales (Billboard)	5
US Top Christian Albums (Billboard)	6
US Independent Albums (Billboard)	9
US Top R&B/Hip-Hop Albums (Billboard)	9
US Billboard 200	44
