= Fred Fonseca =

Fictional character from the BBC soap opera EastEnders

- EastEnders character
- Portrayed by: Jimi Mistry
- Duration: 1998–2000
- First appearance: Episode 1666/1667; 13 September 1998
- Last appearance: Episode 1906; 10 February 2000
- Introduced by: Matthew Robinson
In-universe information
- Occupation: General practitioner

Dr. Fred Fonseca is a fictional character from the BBC soap opera EastEnders, played by Jimi Mistry from 13 September 1998 to 10 February 2000.

== Character creation and development ==
In 1998, EastEnders acquired a new executive producer, Matthew Robinson. Robinson was dubbed "the axeman" in the British press, after a large proportion of the EastEnders cast either quit, or were culled, shortly after Robinson's introduction. It was reported that Robinson hoped the changes would attract more viewers and "spice up [the soap's fictional setting of] Walford".

Among the departing characters were long-running Asian family the Kapoors, including Sanjay, Gita and Neelam Kapoor. As they were the only Asian characters in the show, EastEnders received criticism for axing them from angry black and Asian MPs, including Oona King, MP for East End constituency Bethnal Green, and Dr Ashok Kumar.

In response to the criticism, EastEnders producers announced the upcoming arrival of several ethnic minority characters in July 1998, including an Asian "heart-throb" doctor, later revealed as Fred Fonseca, and the Jamaican relatives of Mick McFarlane (Sylvester Williams), including his mother Josie McFarlane. According to the press report, BBC executives held a brainstorming session with Black and Asian representatives among the writers and cast, to explore ways to reflect London's diverse communities more fully

In July 1998 it was announced that actor Jimi Mistry would be playing the part of Fred, "an attractive young doctor". Commenting on his new role, Mistry said "Let's hope it's a prescription for success – I'm working on my bedside manner".

Dr Fonseca first appeared briefly in 1998, and became Walford's GP full-time in February 1999, heralding the retirement of original character Dr Harold Legg, who had been the soap's GP for 14 years, since the first episode was broadcast in February 1985. Speaking on his decision to replace Dr Legg, executive producer Matthew Robinson said "Dr Legg is getting on a bit, so we're retiring him. He'll be going to a nice cottage in the country."

The character's most notable storyline concerns him coming out as a homosexual, and as a result being subjected to homophobia from several other characters. In May 1999, it was reported that bosses at EastEnders were struggling to hold on to actor Jimi Mistry, due to the box office success of a low-budget film he made prior to joining the soap, East is East. Executive producer Matthew Robinson commented, "We've got Jimi signed up until early next year but by then his choice will be Hollywood or Walford...It could be tricky." The film was an international success, and at the end of his contract in 2000, Mistry left EastEnders to pursue a career as a film actor. At the time the press claimed that Mistry quit because his character was "boring", and Mistry has since commented that he found playing Fred "quite hard".

== Storylines ==
Dr. Fonseca is first seen in September 1998, where he confirms that Bianca Butcher (Patsy Palmer) is expecting a baby. He is the permanent replacement for Dr. Harold Legg (Leonard Fenton), who retired as Walford's GP in 1997. Fred moves into the flat above the surgery with Mick McFarlane (Sylvester Williams). Unlike his predecessor, Fred is not always willing to listen to the medical complaints of his patients outside office hours, and is accused of being tactless and insensitive at times. This, as well as his holistic, nontraditional approach to medicine, does not endear him to all of his patients initially. Fred comes from a wealthy family; his father is a consultant. It is revealed that Fred had not wanted to pursue medicine as a career, but family pressure forced him into the profession.

Fred and Mick become good friends, but despite their closeness, Fred feels unable to tell Mick that he is gay. When Fred attends a medical convention in Brighton in the summer of 1999, Mick and several other residents of Walford go along too. Whilst on the trip, it becomes apparent to everyone, bar Mick, that Fred has something he wants to get off his chest. Fred decides to take Mick to a gay club in the hope that he might guess his sexual orientation, but Mick remains blithely ignorant, and is extremely shocked when Fred finally confesses. Mick does not care that Fred is gay, but he is hurt that Fred had not confided in him sooner, and is just as perturbed to discover that Fred doesn't fancy him. Their friendship remains intact, although Mick's mother Josie (Joan Hooley) who is also Fred's receptionist, is not so understanding and denounces Fred's lifestyle as immoral.

Fred's sexuality also brings to the fore homophobic tendencies in other residents of Walford, including teenager Martin Fowler (James Alexandrou). When Josie's confused stepdaughter, Kim (Krystle Williams), approaches Fred to find out more about homosexuality, Josie accuses Fred of "recruiting Kim to the gay cause", and states that he should not be around young children, which deeply offends Fred. Shortly after, Dr. Fonseca decides to leave Walford to work in a new practice in Islington in February 2000.

== Reception ==
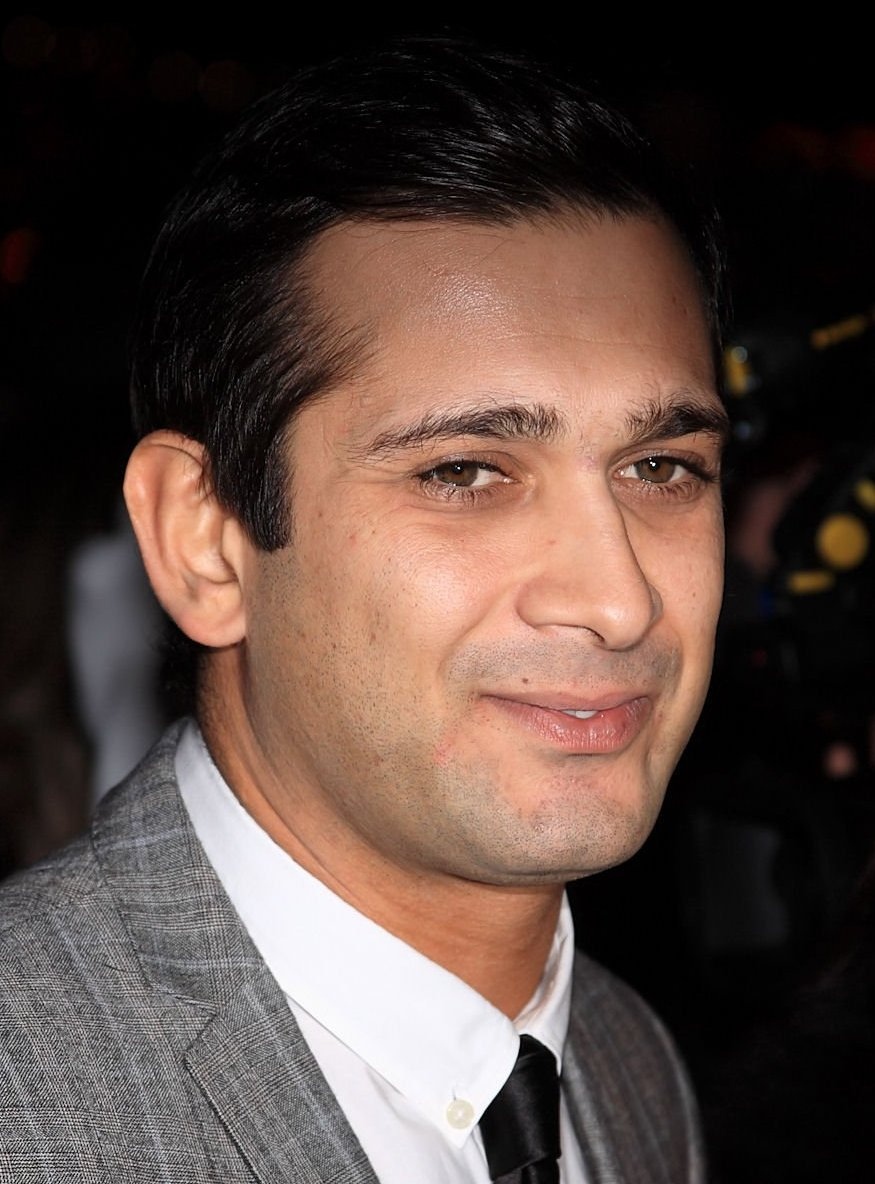
Jimi Mistry (pictured) played Fred, who was heavily criticised for being boring.

The character has been criticised for being boring. He has been described by Phil Hansen of the Walford Gazette as "bland as tofu...the epitome of a sexless gay character, whose only purpose is to prop up the more colorful straight characters", and he has been accused of not existing as "a character in his own right".

The character's exit was also criticised in the Gay Times. The critic comments, "Hardly had he got his stethoscope warmed when he's scared off by a few choice comments by Martin Fowler, a gangly, sullen fifteen-year-old who 'comes over all queer' when Fred scuttles by...Fred is such a coward he's leaving for Islington (implicated as a step up to better things, happier days and no homophobia - the chatterings class round here are so much more tolerant, darling). And everyone's okay with this?...Why do we have to put up with such - yes, I'm going to say it! - namby pamby, piss-weak gay characters who leg it at the first sign of trouble? Everytime EastEnders disgorges a gay character onto the Square I am asked silently, by the glimmer in the eye, whether I think that this time, just maybe, this is will the one...that will merely stay the course!... I admit it now, I have lost the will to even consider that one day, just maybe, there might be." Lorna Cooper of MSN TV listed Fred one of soap opera's "forgotten characters".

== See also ==
- List of LGBT characters in television
- List of fictional doctors
