= Today, Tomorrow, Forever (Corey Paul album) =

Studio album by Corey Paul
- Released: December 15, 2015
- Genre: Christian hip hop
- Length: 33:27
- Label: Collision

Corey Paul chronology
Grace Love Mercy (2013)	Today, Tomorrow, Forever (2015)

Today, Tomorrow, Forever is the second studio album from Corey Paul. Collision Records released the album on December 15, 2015.

== Critical reception ==
Professional ratings
Review scores
Source	Rating
The Christian Beat	3.5/5 stars
New Release Today	3.5/5 stars

Awarding the album three and a half stars for New Release Today, Dwayne Lacy states, "Today, Tomorrow, Forever is a nice soundtrack to go with his testimony and offering of hope." Chris Major, giving the album three and a half stars at The Christian Beat, writes, "While Today, Tomorrow, Forever has its merits, unfortunately, there are a few key details worth addressing...Overall, Today Tomorrow Forever is a mixed bag of well executed hits and close misses."

== Track listing ==
No.	Title	Length
1.	"100 in the Summer"	2:46
2.	"Momma We Made It"	3:09
3.	"Top Rope" (featuring Derek Minor)	3:04
4.	"Come Back Home"	3:24
5.	"My Line" (featuring Bruce Takara)	3:26
6.	"Tear It Up"	3:49
7.	"Die at the Top"	3:18
8.	"Today, Tomorrow, Forever"	4:45
9.	"Real Live Forever"	2:23
10.	"Live to See Forever"	3:23
Total length:		33:27

== Chart performance ==
Chart (2016)	Peak position
US Heatseekers Albums (Billboard)	16
