= Harm Done =

- Author: Ruth Rendell
- Language: English
- Series: Inspector Wexford # 18
- Genre: Crime, Mystery novel
- Publisher: Hutchinson (UK); Crown (US)
- Publication date: September 1999
- Publication place: United Kingdom
- Media type: Print (Hardback & Paperback)
- Pages: 394 pp
- ISBN: 0-09-180133-8
- OCLC: 42309501
- Preceded by: Road Rage
- Followed by: The Babes in the Wood

Harm Done is a novel by British crime-writer Ruth Rendell, published in 1999. The novel is part of her popular Inspector Wexford detective series, and examines themes such as paedophilia and domestic violence.

== Reception ==
Lynn Crosbie of the National Post called it "an excellent read, patiently and thoughtfully rendered, and of wider political interest than some of the other, more village-bound Wexfords." Mary Campbell of the Associated Press called the novel "riveting, as good or better than previous Wexford novels but darker in tone." Diane White of The Boston Globe opined that while the novel is "not Rendell at her very best", fans of her Wexford series "will be pleased." White praised the "perceptive" treatment of topics such as domestic abuse and vigilante justice, as well as the characters, who are "drawn in insightful detail."
