= No More Dying Then =

1971 novel by Ruth Rendell

- First edition (UK)
- Author: Ruth Rendell
- Language: English
- Series: Inspector Wexford #6
- Genre: Crime, Mystery novel
- Publisher: Hutchinson (UK); The Crime Club (US)
- Publication date: 4 October 1971
- Publication place: United Kingdom
- Media type: Print (hardback & paperback)
- ISBN: 0-09-108150-5
- OCLC: 15523997
- Preceded by: A Guilty Thing Surprised
- Followed by: Murder Being Once Done

No More Dying Then is a novel by the British crime-writer Ruth Rendell. It was first published in 1971, and is the sixth title in her popular Inspector Wexford series. The Independent Mystery Booksellers Association listed the book as one of its 100 Favourite Crime Novels of the Century.
