= Simisola =

1994 novel by Ruth Rendell

- First edition (UK)
- Author: Ruth Rendell
- Language: English7
- Series: Inspector Wexford # 17
- Genre: Crime, Mystery novel
- Publisher: Hutchinson (UK); Crown (US)
- Publication date: 24 September 1994
- Publication place: United Kingdom
- Media type: Print (Hardback & Paperback)
- Pages: 348 pp
- ISBN: 0-09-179161-8
- OCLC: 31331007
- Preceded by: Kissing the Gunner's Daughter
- Followed by: Road Rage

Simisola is a 1994 novel by British crime writer Ruth Rendell. It features her recurring detective Inspector Wexford, and is the 17th in the series. Though a murder mystery, the book also touches on the themes of racism, welfare dependency and new forms of slavery.

== Plot summary ==
Dr Raymond Akande is Wexford's new GP and one of the few Black British people in Kingsmarkham. When Akande's daughter goes missing, and a body of a young black woman is found, Wexford is confronted by his own prejudices.

== Critical reception ==
The Daily Courier wrote about the book: "...some of it gets tedious, especially when characters who do not consider themselves racists search themselves for racist traits".

== Film, TV or theatrical adaptations ==
The novel was adapted into a television film in the UK in 1996 and starred George Baker, Christopher Ravenscroft, Jane Lapotaire, and George Harris.
