= 34 (album) =

Studio album by Dre Murray
- Released: November 27, 2015
- Genre: Christian hip hop
- Length: 36:36
- Label: Collision

Dre Murray chronology
Gold Rush: Maybe One Day (2013)	34 (2015)

34 is the fourth studio album from Dre Murray. Collision Records released the album on November 27, 2015.

== Critical reception ==
Professional ratings
Review scores
Source	Rating
New Release Today	4/5 stars

Awarding the album four stars at New Release Today, Dwayne Lacy states, "Lyrically this album is incredibly strong, but something seems to be missing." Aubrey J. McKay, reviewing the album from Wade-O Radio, writes, "34 isn’t the best album Dre Murray has in his catalog, but it is definitely one of the better projects of 2015."

== Track listing ==
No.	Title	Length
1.	"1981"	2:04
2.	"Turn It"	3:53
3.	"DWB" (featuring David James)	3:57
4.	"1989 (Taylor Swift)" (featuring Tragic Hero)	3:53
5.	"Family Tree" (featuring David James)	3:36
6.	"22"	4:38
7.	"American Death Triangle"	4:16
8.	"Cliffhanger (Interlude)"	2:11
9.	"Play Me at Your Wedding"	3:48
10.	"Paintriot"	4:20
Total length:		36:36

== Chart performance ==
Chart (2015)	Peak position
US Christian Albums (Billboard)	38
US Independent Albums (Billboard)	46
