= The Vault (novel) =

2011 novel by Ruth Rendell

- Cover of the first edition (UK)
- Author: Ruth Rendell
- Language: English
- Series: Inspector Wexford # 23
- Genre: Crime/Mystery novel
- Publisher: Hutchinson
- Publication date: 2011
- Publication place: United Kingdom
- Media type: Print (Hardback & Paperback)
- Pages: 368 pp
- ISBN: 9780091937102
- Preceded by: The Monster in the Box
- Followed by: No Man's Nightingale

The Vault is a novel by British crime-writer Ruth Rendell, published in 2011. The novel is the 23rd in the Inspector Wexford series. It is a sequel to her previous standalone novel A Sight For Sore Eyes. The novel is the first sequel Rendell has written, and the first to feature Wexford in retirement.

== Plot summary ==
Reg and Dora Wexford have moved from Kingsmarkham to a renovated London Coachhouse owned by their daughter Sheila. Although Wexford has retired he acts as a consultant to a friend who works for the Metropolitan Police. Together they investigate the mystery of the remains of four bodies which have been discovered in Orcadia Cottage, an old house situated in the suburb of St. John's Wood.
