= The Speaker of Mandarin =

Book by Ruth Rendell

- First edition (UK)
- Author: Ruth Rendell
- Language: English
- Series: Inspector Wexford #12
- Genre: Crime, Mystery novel
- Publisher: Hutchinson (UK); Pantheon Books (US)
- Publication date: 7 February 1983
- Publication place: United Kingdom
- Media type: Print (Hardback & Paperback)
- Pages: 224 pp
- ISBN: 0-09-151060-0
- OCLC: 9517069
- Preceded by: Put on By Cunning
- Followed by: An Unkindness of Ravens

The Speaker of Mandarin (abbreviated to Speaker of Mandarin in the US) is a detective novel by British crime writer Ruth Rendell, first published in 1983. It is the 12th novel in her popular Inspector Wexford series. The plot follows the popular Kingsmarkham (a fictional market town in the county of Sussex) policeman as he returns from a holiday to China and investigates the death of another tourist.

== Synopsis ==
While holidaying in China, Inspector Reginald Wexford was haunted by a couple of mysterious occurrences, namely an old woman with bound feet who appeared to be following him from one city to another, and a man's drowning. On returning home he's tasked with investigating the murder of a tourist and realises that this death relates to his experiences abroad.

== Reviews ==
The reviewer for Kirkus Reviews said of the book that it was: "Less tight and polished than Death Notes, with a ho-hum fadeout — but a disarming, fairly irresistible blend of mini-puzzles, solid detection, splendid travel writing, and Wexford charm."

"The Passing Tramp", a pseudonymous blogger who's written and contributed to several publications on the subject of mystery fiction (including Masters of the "Humdrum" Mystery: Cecil John Charles Street, Freeman Wills Crofts, Alfred Walter Stewart and the British Detective Novel, under the name Curtis Evans), observed the relationship of Rendell's plot with old English tales of supernatural menace (remarking that she wrote the introduction to a book of M. R. James ghost stories). It also contains the drowning of a boat of passengers, an element reminiscent of "certain classic Thirties [sic] mysteries by Agatha Christie."

The review mentions the dated caricaturing of a Chinese tour guide near the start of the novel ("He would have given a good deal to have been rid of baby-faced, pink-cheeked, slant-eyed Mr. Sung," writes Rendell of Wexford on the second page"), but mentions that these appear in "just a scant few pages where this occurs, right at the beginning and it could easily be edited by modern publishers; [and] in truth all of the Chinese characters in the story are window dressing." The review goes on to mention Rendell's East Asian heritage.
