= Road Rage (novel) =

1997 novel by Ruth Rendell

- Author: Ruth Rendell
- Language: English
- Series: Inspector Wexford # 17
- Genre: Crime, mystery novel
- Publisher: Hutchinson (UK); Crown (US)
- Publication date: 4 September 1997
- Publication place: United Kingdom
- Media type: Print (hardback & paperback)
- Pages: 336 pp
- ISBN: 0-09-179230-4
- OCLC: 246968691
- Preceded by: Simisola
- Followed by: Harm Done

Road Rage is a 1997 novel by British crime-writer Ruth Rendell. Its protagonist is Inspector Wexford, and is the 17th entry in the series. The novel's main themes are the environment and environmental activism.

== Reception ==
Diane Fisher Johnson of the Lexington Herald-Leader opined that the novel is "above all, the tight, well-crafted crime story Rendell's readers expect." James King of The Hamilton Spectator wrote that Wexford "has never been rendered more poignantly than in this outing", calling the novel the "strongest Wexford ever." Sue Ann Wood of the St. Louis Post-Dispatch called the novel "much more than a police procedural" and a "superb example of that genre."
