= C.A.B. =

- Starring: Felipe Izquierdo; Louise Mason
- Country of origin: United Kingdom
- No. of episodes: 33

Production
- Running time: approx. 0:20 (per episode)

Original release
- Network: ITV (CITV)
- Release: 23 September 1986 – 15 August 1989

C.A.B. is a British television programme which was produced by Thames Television for Children's ITV. The drama revolved around Colin Freshwater (Felipe Izquierdo) and Franny Barnes (Louise Mason) and the strange happenings in their junk shop. The show ran for three series (with a total of 33 episodes), which were broadcast in the UK between 1986 and 1989.

== Cast ==
- Felipe Izquierdo - Colin Freshwater
- Louise Mason - Franny Barnes
- Frank Gatliff - Mr Hellman
- Graham Seed - Smith
- Lyndam Gregory - Anwar
- Victor Maddern - Private Tripe
- Joan Hooley - Umma
- David Janes - Policeman
- Keith Varnier - Nyegel
- Ben Felton - Jace Freshwater
- Tracey McDonald - Tracey Barnes
- John Vine - Robert
- Michael Bertenshaw - Vine
- Judith Paris - Eleanor
