= Off Their Rockers (British TV series) =

British hidden camera sketch series

- Genre: Hidden camera sketch show
- Created by: Tim Van Aelst
- Directed by: Matt Holt (2014–); Tom Vinnicombe (2014–); Steve Harwood (2014–); Ian Curtis (2014); Simon Gibney (2014)
- Starring: Current cast
- Composers: Jess Bailey; Graeme Perkins
- Country of origin: United Kingdom
- Original language: English
- No. of series: 4 (+1 specials series)
- No. of episodes: 28 (inc. specials) (list of episodes)

Production
- Executive producers: Murray Boland; Mobashir Dar; Danielle Lux
- Producer: Mike Worsley (2013)
- Editors: Michael Wolf; Alex Kirkland (2014–15); Duncan O'Neill (2013)
- Running time: 30 minutes (inc. adverts)
- Production company: CPL Productions

Original release
- Network: ITV
- Release: 7 April 2013 – 16 December 2016

Related
- Benidorm Bastards (Belgium); Betty White's Off Their Rockers (USA)

Off Their Rockers is a British hidden camera sketch series on ITV. The programme is based on the American series Betty White's Off Their Rockers. The UK series sees senior citizens turn the tables on unsuspecting members of the public in a series of funny and unexpected pranks. The format originates from Belgium ("Benidorm Bastards").

Two special episodes known as the Blue Badge specials aired in June 2015, starring a new cast.

== Cast ==
Current

- Rosemary Macvie (2013–)
- Rosie Bannister (2013–)
- Royston Mayoh (2013–)
- Seb Craig (2013–)
- Sonia Elliman (2013–)
- Keith Bayross (2013–)
- Morrison Thomas (2013–)
- Chris Lewis (2014–; Uncredited)
- Velma Davies (2013–)
- Nick Hobbs (2014–)
- Tony Lo (2014–)
- Ken Moxley (2014–)
- Dave Norman (2014–)
- Marry Hyam (2014–)
- Denise Ryan (2014–; Stunts)
- Ray Casey (2014–; Uncredited)
- Joan Hooley (2015–)
- Pamela Lyne (2015–)
- Andrew Haynes (2015–)

Former

- Iris Sharples (2013–2014) – Died during filming for the second series
- Hugo Gunning (2013–2014)
- Barry Newton (2013–2015)
- Paul Weston (2014–2015)

=== Blue Badge specials cast ===
- Jack Binstead
- Stephen Bunce
- Ollie Hancock
- Paul Henshall
- Tommy Jessop
- Karina Jones
- Francesca Mills
- Liam O'Carroll
- Reece Pantry
- Jacqui Press
- Daniel Wilkes

== Transmissions ==
Series	Episodes	Series premiere	Series finale	Average UK viewers (in millions)
1	6	7 April 2013	12 May 2013	4.46
2	7	6 April 2014	18 May 2014	3.40
3	7	1 March 2015	12 April 2015	3.08
Blue Badge Specials	2	1 June 2015	8 June 2015	
4	6	6 November 2016	11 December 2016	

== Episodes ==
=== Series 1 ===
The first series of Off Their Rockers aired for six episodes from 7 April until 12 May 2013.

Episode No.	Original air date	Viewers (millions)	ITV weekly ranking
1	7 April 2013	4.79	15
2	14 April 2013	5.26	15
3	21 April 2013	4.68	17
4	28 April 2013	4.45	16
5	5 May 2013	3.44	20
6	12 May 2013	4.15	18

=== Series 2 ===
The second series was commissioned in July 2013. It began airing on 6 April 2014 and ran for seven episodes. The final episode of this series was dedicated to Iris Sharples, a former participant, who died on 22 November 2013, during filming for the second series.

Episode No.	Original air date	Viewers (millions)	ITV weekly ranking
1	6 April 2014	4.01	17
2	13 April 2014	3.82	18
3	20 April 2014	3.31	17
4	27 April 2014	3.37	20
5	4 May 2014	3.10	19
6	11 May 2014	3.29	15
7	18 May 2014	2.90	17

=== Series 3 ===
A third series was commissioned in August 2014 and began airing on 1 March 2015 for six episodes.

Episode No.	Original air date	Viewers (millions)	ITV weekly ranking
1	1 March 2015	3.31	18
2	8 March 2015	3.22	18
3	15 March 2015	3.12	16
4	22 March 2015	3.09	21
5	29 March 2015	2.96	19
6	5 April 2015	—N/a	Outside Top 30
7	12 April 2015	2.75	19

=== Blue Badge Specials ===
The two Blue Badge special episodes were announced on 12 April 2015, during the concluding episode of series 3. These were aired in June 2015 on Mondays at 9:30pm.

Episode No.	Original air date	Viewers (millions)	ITV weekly ranking
1	1 June 2015	1.84 (overnight)	Outside Top 30
2	8 June 2015	—N/a	Outside Top 30

=== Series 4 ===
A fourth series was commissioned and began airing on 6 November 2016 for six episodes. The show moved to an earlier timeslot of 18:30 on Sunday evenings. This series saw celebrities taking part in the pranks for the first time.

Episode No.	Original air date	Celebrity appearances	Viewers (millions)	ITV weekly ranking
1	6 November 2016	Joey Essex	—N/a	Outside Top 30
2	13 November 2016	Katie Price	—N/a	Outside Top 30
3	20 November 2016	Louis Walsh	—N/a	Outside Top 30
4	27 November 2016	Kym Marsh	—N/a	Outside Top 30
5	4 December 2016	Louie Spence	—N/a	Outside Top 30
6	11 December 2016	Tulisa Contostavlos	—N/a	Outside Top 30
