= Inspector Wexford =

Fictional character

Reginald Wexford
- First appearance: From Doon With Death
- Last appearance: No Man's Nightingale
- Created by: Ruth Rendell
- Portrayed by: George Baker

In-universe information
- Gender: Male
- Title: Chief Inspector
- Occupation: Police officer
- Nationality: British

Chief Inspector Reginald "Reg" Wexford was a recurring character in a series of detective novels by the late English crime writer Ruth Rendell. He made his first appearance in the author's 1964 debut From Doon With Death, and was the protagonist of 23 more novels (plus six short stories and one novella) making his final appearance in 2013's No Man's Nightingale. In the TVS television series The Ruth Rendell Mysteries (1987–2000), he was played by George Baker.

== Character ==
During the 2010 ITV series "The People's Detective" Rendell stated about the creation of Wexford:

Well, what I had done was write a detective story for fun, to see if I could, featuring chief Inspector Wexford, and it was called From Doon with Death. And Wexford was in it, simply there to investigate the crime. I didn’t know that he would become a series character and in fact, become a popular detective. I had to give him a name. I’d just been on holiday in Ireland and it was a choice between whether he was called Waterford or Wexford, and Wexford won, I don’t know why. The same thing applied to the name of the town, which is based on Midhurst in Sussex, where I lived for a while as a child. And I chose Kingsmarkham because my son, who was a little boy at the time, had a friend who was called Markham. And the Kings, it was either kings or bishops. Again. I chose kings.

In a 2013 interview, Rendell stated:

Wexford is a Liberal Democrat though, and I am a Labour party member, in fact, a Labour peer, so I am further to the left than him.

In the same interview, Rendell reveals that Wexford was very much of herself: 'Unlike Conan Doyle with Holmes, I don't get sick of him because he's me. He's very much me,' she says of Wexford. 'He doesn't look like me, of course, but the way he thinks and his principles and his ideas and what he likes doing, that's me. So I think you don't get tired of yourself.'

Wexford is an intelligent, well-read, sensitive man. He is married to a placid, patient, intuitive wife, Dora, whose role expands as the novels' timelines progress. The couple have two daughters, Sheila and Sylvia. He has a good relationship with Sheila (an actress, and also his favourite) but a more complicated one with Sylvia (a social worker, who feels slighted though he has never actually intended to slight her). The Wexfords have five grandchildren. He also has a strong and enduring friendship with Detective Inspector Michael "Mike" Burden.

== Setting ==
The Wexford series of novels are set in "Kingsmarkham", a fictional town in Sussex. Kingsmarkham has been reported as "inspired by Midhurst in West Sussex".

Rendell says that Kingsmarkham "is not romantic at all, (with) ugly modern buildings, huge supermarkets, open car lots and bus garages, and sprawling blocks of local authority housing with the police station a concrete box of tricks amid the quiet crowded houses of High Street … a piece of gaudy litter in a pastoral glade and having modern furniture and (a) sleek, gleaming reception counter".

== Novels ==
1. From Doon with Death (1964)
2. A New Lease of Death (1967) (American title Sins of the Fathers)
3. Wolf to the Slaughter (1968)
4. The Best Man to Die (1969)
5. A Guilty Thing Surprised (1970)
6. No More Dying Then (1971)
7. Murder Being Once Done (1972)
8. Some Lie and Some Die (1973)
9. Shake Hands Forever (1975)
10. A Sleeping Life (1978)
11. Put on By Cunning (1981) (American title Death Notes)
12. The Speaker of Mandarin (1983)
13. An Unkindness of Ravens (1985)
14. The Veiled One (1988)
15. Kissing the Gunner's Daughter (1992)
16. Simisola (1994)
17. Road Rage (1997)
18. Harm Done (1999)
19. The Babes in the Wood (2002)
20. End in Tears (2005)
21. Not in the Flesh (2007)
22. The Monster in the Box (2009)
23. The Vault (2011)
24. No Man's Nightingale (2013)

== Short story collections ==
- Means of Evil and Other Stories (1979) (five Inspector Wexford stories)
- The Copper Peacock and Other Stories (1991) (includes one Inspector Wexford short story)
- Blood Lines: Long and Short Stories (1995) (includes Inspector Wexford novella title story)
