= Barbara Keogh =

British actress (1929–2005)

- Keogh as Lilly Mattock in EastEnders
- Born: 21 April 1929; Bucklow, Cheshire, England
- Died: 25 October 2005 (aged 76); Camden, London, England
- Education: London Academy of Music and Dramatic Art
- Occupation: Actress
- Notable work: EastEnders

Barbara Keogh (21 April 1929 – 25 October 2005) was a British actress. Keogh is most noted for her work on television, particularly her role as Lilly Mattock on the BBC soap opera EastEnders.

== Early life and career ==
Keogh was born on 21 April 1929 in Bucklow, Cheshire, as Barbara Winifred Keogh, to father Joseph Lowe Keogh and mother Winifred Hamson. Her mother died in 1946 and father in 1996. She trained at the Birmingham School of Speech and Drama, before going on to study at the London Academy of Music and Dramatic Art. Keogh acted alongside John Osborne and Ronnie Barker at Kidderminster Repertory Theatre before touring with Bill Kerr in a production of The Teahouse of the August Moon.

== Television career ==
Keogh made her television debut in 1958 as Mrs Pemberton in Champion Road, and continued to be a regular on television until her death. She had roles on programmes including Dixon of Dock Green, Z Cars, The Sweeney and The Newcomers. She also appeared alongside Judi Dench in On Giant’s Shoulders.

Keogh played various parts in the soaps Coronation Street and Crossroads, before joining the cast of EastEnders as Lilly Mattock on 5 November 1998. She was written out of the serial a little under a year later, on 2 September 1999, after 50 episodes. Keogh was said to be "devastated" by the decision to axe her character, which was prompted by June Brown, who cited the comedy double act between Dot and Lilly not being right.

She continued to work in television, making appearances in Juliet Bravo, The Ruth Rendell Mysteries, Heartbeat, Game On, My Family and Casualty. One of Keogh's last television roles was playing Marjorie Dawes' mother in the comedy series Little Britain.

== Theatre career ==
Alongside Keogh's television career, her stage work included performances in No One Was Saved with Maureen Lipman at the Royal Court Theatre, and in Adventures of the Skin Trade alongside David Hemmings at the Hampstead Theatre. She also played roles in John Gabriel Borkman with Ralph Richardson and Peggy Ashcroft, Plunder with Dinsdale Landen and Frank Finlay, and Engaged with Jonathan Pryce, all at the Royal National Theatre.

Latterly, Keogh worked alongside Bob Hoskins, Helen Mirren and Pete Postlethwaite in The Duchess of Malfi and toured in Sisterly Feelings with Peter Sallis, Trudie Styler, Tessa Peake-Jones and Bryan Pringle.

== Personal life and death ==
Outside of acting, Keogh enjoyed travelling. In her later years, she lived in Kings Cross, London.

Keogh continued to work until her sudden death on 25 October 2005, aged 76. She was cremated at Golders Green Crematorium.

== Filmography ==
- Mike Bassett: Manager as Margaret (2005)
- .357 Old Woman (2005)
- Bloodlines as Soho Bartender (2005)
- Little Britain as Mrs. Dawes (2003–2005), Mrs. Craig (2004), various other roles (2005)
- Ready When You Are Mr. McGill as Mrs. Danby (2003)
- The Secret as Maureen (2002)
- Tough Love as Lady Mayoress (2000)
- EastEnders as Lilly Mattock (1998–1999)
- Lost in France as Gran (1998)
- Bramwell as Landlady (1998)
- The Grimleys as Nan Grimley (1997–1999)
- Jane Eyre as Miss Abbot (1997)
- Coronation Street as Landlady (1996)
- Brazen Hussies as Ruby (1996)
- The Ghostbusters of East Finchley as Thelma Thane (1995)
- Princess Caraboo as Mrs. Wilberforce (1994)
- Heartbeat as Edith Gillet (1993)
- Dead Romantic as Mrs. Rankin (1992)
- Murder Being Once Done as Mrs. Foster (1991)
- God on the Rocks as Nurse Booth (1990)
- One Last Chance as Agatha (1990)
- Making Out as Sally (1989)
- Open All Hours as Mrs. Ellis (1976)
- Public Eye as Gladys Mottram (1973)
- The Abominable Dr. Phibes as Mrs. Frawley (1971)
- Softly, Softly as Eva Nevin (1968)
