= Gold Rush: Maybe One Day =

Studio album by Dre Murray
- Released: July 9, 2013
- Genre: Hip-Hop/Rap, Christian hip hop, Urban contemporary gospel
- Length: 53:53
- Label: Collision

Dre Murray chronology
Manumit (2008)	Gold Rush: Maybe One Day (2013)	34 (2015)

Gold Rush: Maybe One Day is the third studio album by the American Christian hip hop musician Dre Murray. Released on July 9, 2013 by Collision Records, it reached No. 189 on the Billboard 200.

== Critical reception ==
Professional ratings
Review scores
Source	Rating
AllMusic	4/5 stars
Christian Music Zine	5/5 stars
New Release Tuesday	4.5/5 stars

Gold Rush: Maybe One Day received three positive reviews from music critics. At AllMusic, Andy Kellman rated the album four stars, writing, "Murray offers his strongest and most focused solo set yet." Dwayne Lacy of New Release Tuesday rated the album four-and-a-half stars, writing that "Dre keeps it real and relevant" with this release full of "masterful production and heavy lyrical content". At Christian Music Zine, Anthony Peronto rated the album a perfect five stars, saying, "With no filler tracks, generic trap beats, or any hype songs made for workout sessions this isn't an album for the casual listen" because "Dre Murray has made one of the best albums of the year and it's a mature work that deserves attention."

== Chart performance ==
For the Billboard charting week of July 27, 2013, Gold Rush: Maybe One Day charted at No. 189 on the Billboard 200, No. 8 and 6 on the Christian Albums and Top Gospel Albums charts, respectively, No. 15 on the Rap Albums, and No. 38 on the Independent Albums chart.

== Track listing ==
Tracklist
No.	Title	Length
1.	"Sutter's Mill"	2:04
2.	"Maybe One Day" (featuring Christon Gray)	4:46
3.	"Ramesses the Great" (featuring Propaganda)	1:04
4.	"Pharoah" (featuring Tragic Hero)	4:07
5.	"Fiend"	3:57
6.	"Benjamin's Curse"	3:46
7.	"Gold Rush"	4:06
8.	"Red Light" (featuring Christon Gray)	4:40
9.	"Alchemy" (featuring Tragic Hero)	5:40
10.	"Letter in a Bottle" (featuring Michael Guaglione)	4:38
11.	"Hollywood Heist" (featuring Christon Gray, Sean Johnson and Swoope)	4:13
12.	"Welcome to My Life" (featuring Alex Faith and Swoope)	4:12
13.	"All Alone"	3:36
14.	"Gray Tape"	3:04
Total length:		53:53

== Charts ==
Chart (2013)	Peak position
US Billboard 200	189
US Christian Albums (Billboard)	8
US Top Gospel Albums (Billboard)	6
US Independent Albums (Billboard)	38
US Top Rap Albums (Billboard)	15
