= Put on By Cunning =

1981 novel by Ruth Rendell

- First edition (UK)
- Author: Ruth Rendell
- Language: English
- Series: Inspector Wexford #11
- Genre: Crime, Mystery novel
- Publisher: Hutchinson (UK); Pantheon Books (US)
- Publication date: 13 April 1981
- Publication place: United Kingdom
- Media type: Print (Hardback & Paperback)
- Pages: 207 pp
- ISBN: 0-09-144120-X
- OCLC: 7587626
- Dewey Decimal: 823/.914 19
- LC Class: PR6068.E63 P87 1981
- Preceded by: A Sleeping Life
- Followed by: The Speaker of Mandarin

Put on by Cunning is a novel by British crime-writer Ruth Rendell. It was first published in 1981, and features her popular series protagonist Inspector Wexford. It is the 11th in the series.

The title comes from a quotation from Shakespeare's Hamlet, Act V Scene II:

"How these things came about: so shall you hear Of carnal, bloody, and unnatural acts, Of accidental judgments, casual slaughters; of deaths put on by cunning and forced cause, And, in this upshot, purposes mistook Fall'n on the inventors' heads: all this can I Truly deliver".

In the US, the novel was published under the title Death Notes.

== Plot ==
Manuel Camargue, a retired flute virtuoso, is about to marry young Dinah when one January night he dies trapped in the ice of a pond near his home. He had been out walking his dog. Initially thought to be an accident, it later turns out that the musician was about to disinherit his only daughter from his first marriage. Father and daughter had not seen each other for nineteen years, and since the daughter had recently returned from California, a curious fact had alarmed the investigators, particularly Reg Wexford: there had apparently been a meeting between Natalie, the daughter, and Sir Manuel, the father, but during the conversation, Camargue suddenly accused the woman he was talking to of being an impostor and that she would not receive a penny from him. Apparently, the woman had admitted to impersonating Sir Manuel's daughter; the one who reported the entire disconcerting episode was Dinah, the bride-to-be.

The flutist's sudden death had two serious consequences: his daughter had been the sole heir until then, and remained so; Dinah was supposed to be the sole heir, but this would only be the case after marriage and the drafting of a new will. Given the circumstances, Natalie arrives at her father's house and takes possession without hesitation; she has two friends with her, Ivan and Jane Zoffany. The lawyers who held Camargue's will establish that the woman is exactly who she says she is, and there is a wealth of evidence supporting her identity, from handwriting tests to various identifications. Only one aunt, the sister of her late mother, refuses to meet Natalie, and this does not harm her, although serious resentments have existed between the two women. Wexford goes so far as to travel to California to learn more, but all he can discover is that Natalie, after her widowhood, had a mysterious relationship with a Swiss man who was expelled from the United States because he did not meet the requirements to reside in the country. But nothing is discovered about this character's appearance or identity.

Natalie behaves insolently and indisposedly, but from a legal standpoint, she takes care to sell her father's house, after putting all the valuables in it into storage. Only Sir Manuel's dog remains with Dinah, and the two servants who looked after Camargue, in turn, put up for sale the little house that had been given to them by the musician. Then everyone leaves. Just then, Jane Zoffany disappears, after an argument with her husband, whom she accuses of being Natalie's lover. The search inevitably leads to the furniture warehouse, where Natalie's body, her throat slit, is found in a very large trunk. Wexford, however, finds Zoffany in his sister's house, but realizes she is mad, with a history of hospitalizations, and will need to be committed.

At this point, only one possibility remains: since Sir Manuel's inheritance goes to his niece (the daughter of his only sister) who lives in southern France, Wexford, along with his colleague Burden, sets out to meet her. The woman, Thérèse Lerémy, works in a museum and has a face marked by many small scars. During their meeting, the investigators discover that she has a lover, and that he is not at all unwelcome. So, with the help of a French inspector, they all go to the place where the lovers are to meet and arrest the man. Who is he? A dual national: Swiss, by the name of Fassbender, English, like John Cooper. Natalie's lover for years, he first killed her father, then her, and now he has begun courting his cousin, always to secure Sir Manuel's inheritance. The story of Natalie's accusation of being an impostor is also explained: Since she couldn't go to her father on the appointed day, poor Jane Zoffany went in her place. Initially mistaken by the old man for his daughter, she was later unmasked and told the truth: that she had come in Natalie's place. But Sir Manuel interpreted the episode as a cruel hoax, since he was unaware of Jane's mental disorders and her endless eccentricities.
