= Rosie Bannister =

British actress

- Born: Rosemary Bannister; 9 June 1937 (age 87); London, United Kingdom
- Occupation(s): Actress, Voiceover
- Years active: 1997–2002, 2012—
- Known for: Off Their Rockers (2013–)
- Height: 5 ft 1 in (1.55 m)

Rosemary "Rosie" Bannister is a semi-retired British television and stage actress, best known for her appearances in the ITV prank show Off Their Rockers since 2013.

== Biography ==
She gained a professional qualification in drama (University of Nottinghamshire), R.S.A. Diploma in 1977 in Acting and Theatre Studies.

Rosie is a qualified teacher and adjudicator in Speech and Drama. She was an extra in Burke & Hare, Will, Weighed In, Warm up Boy, Holby City, Trollied and The Royal Bodyguard.

She has appeared in commercials for Euro Car Parks, Tesco and Santander bank. She also played Mrs. Himlet in the Marshal's Law television series.

Rosie appeared in the ITV hidden camera prank show Off Their Rockers from 2013 to 2016. She was one of the elderly cast who played pranks on unsuspecting members of the public. In 2014, she made an appearance on the BBC One magazine show The One Show, talking about Off Their Rockers.

She played the role of Olivia Thornton in the 2014 TV movie The Vendor. She also played the role of Agnes Carpenter in one-off TV show Autopsy: The Last Hours Of Karen Carpenter, shown in 2014.

Rosie is married with two children, Jane and Richard. She has five grandchildren.
