= Some Lie and Some Die =

1973 novel by Ruth Rendell

Some Lie And Some Die
- First edition (UK)
- Author: Ruth Rendell
- Language: English
- Series: Inspector Wexford #8
- Genre: Crime, Mystery novel
- Publisher: Hutchinson; The Crime Club (US)
- Publication date: 16 April 1973
- Publication place: United Kingdom
- Media type: Print (Hardback & Paperback)
- Pages: 192 pp
- ISBN: 0-09-115050-7
- OCLC: 694699
- Dewey Decimal: 823/.9/14
- LC Class: PZ4.R4132 So3 PR6068.E63
- Preceded by: Murder Being Once Done
- Followed by: Shake Hands Forever

Some Lie And Some Die is a novel by British crime-writer Ruth Rendell, first published in 1973. It is the 8th entry in her popular Inspector Wexford series. The book was adapted in 1990 into a TV movie starring Peter Capaldi.

== Plot ==
During a pop music festival in Kingsmarkham (a fictional town based on Midhurst in West Sussex), attended by about 80,000 fans, a corpse is discovered in a quarry alongside a red dress. The victim is Dawn Stonor, a local girl who became a stripper. Investigator Wexford investigates her murder and the potential involvement of the festival's headliner, rock star Zeno Vedast.

== Critical reception ==
The New York Times cited the novel upon publication as among Rendell's best, writing: "Rendell, in her quiet way, can move mountains." Kirkus Reviews also praised the book.
