= The Babes in the Wood =

2002 novel by Ruth Rendell

- First edition cover (UK)
- Author: Ruth Rendell
- Language: English
- Series: Inspector Wexford #19
- Genre: Crime novel
- Publisher: Hutchinson (UK); Crown (US)
- Publication date: 2002
- Publication place: United Kingdom
- Media type: Print (Hardback & Paperback)
- Pages: 323 pp
- ISBN: 0-09-179446-3
- OCLC: 50495599
- Preceded by: Harm Done
- Followed by: End in Tears

The Babes in the Wood is a 2002 novel by British crime-writer Ruth Rendell. It is the 19th entry in the popular Inspector Wexford series, and is set, as usual, in Kingsmarkham. In 2003, it was selected by The New York Times as one of the top five crime novels of the year.

== Plot ==
During a rainy season that threatens to flood the town of Kingsmarkham two teenagers and their young adult sitter go missing. Inspector Wexford must attempt to solve the mystery of their disappearance, looking for information in clues like the crashed car of Joanna Troy, the sitter, and a strange religious sect.
