= Kissing the Gunner's Daughter =

1992 novel by Ruth Rendell

- First edition (UK)
- Author: Ruth Rendell
- Language: English
- Series: Inspector Wexford # 15
- Genre: Crime, mystery novel
- Publisher: Hutchinson (UK); Mysterious Press (US)
- Publication date: January 1992
- Publication place: United Kingdom
- Media type: Print (hardback & paperback)
- Pages: 345 pp
- ISBN: 0-09-175218-3
- OCLC: 26302136
- Preceded by: The Veiled One
- Followed by: Simisola

Kissing the Gunner's Daughter is a 1992 novel by the British mystery writer Ruth Rendell, featuring the recurring character Inspector Reg Wexford. The title refers to historical corporal punishment in the Royal Navy where a sailor kissing the gunner's daughter was lashed to a cannon to receive a flogging.

== Plot ==
Four members of a well-to-do family in Kingsmarkham are gunned down by an intruder in their grand house during dinner. The three dead are a successful, respected writer, Davina Flory, her younger second husband and her only daughter, a middle-aged divorcée. Davina's beautiful, cosseted only grand-daughter, the teenaged Daisy, survives with minor injuries and summons help by telephone. Wexford is summoned from an uncomfortable family dinner to attend the crime scene, becomes fascinated by Daisy, towards whom he adopts a protective attitude, as he attempts to solve the murders. The initial dinner massacre is followed by further killings in Daisy's immediate circle. Wexford's attitude towards Daisy is paralleled thematically, with his relationship with his own beloved daughter Sheila (a successful actress), inexplicably besotted by and engaged to an obnoxious avant-garde novelist, Augustine Casey, whose arrogance, condescension and rudeness infuriate Wexford and his wife, Dora. The father Daisy has never met turns out to be a former football player nicknamed "Gunner" because he played for Arsenal Football Club, known as "The Gunners": hence the book's punning title.

== Critical reception ==
Entertainment Weekly praised the novel's analysis of class politics in Britain, but found the plot and its denouement both obvious and far-fetched.
