= No Man's Nightingale =

Book by Ruth Rendell

- First edition (UK)
- Author: Ruth Rendell
- Language: English
- Series: Inspector Wexford # 24
- Genre: Crime/mystery novel
- Publisher: Hutchinson
- Publication date: 2013
- Publication place: United Kingdom
- Media type: Print (hardback & paperback)
- Pages: 288 pp
- ISBN: 0-09-195384-7
- Preceded by: The Vault

No Man's Nightingale is a novel by crime writer Ruth Rendell, published in 2013. It features her recurring protagonist Inspector Wexford. The novel is the second in which Wexford has appeared after his retirement, and on this occasion is called in to consult on a crime by his ex-colleague and friend Mike Burden.

The book is initially about Vicar Sarah Hussain of Saint Peter's Church in Kingsmarkham, who has been found strangled to death in the vicarage. Reginald Wexford, now retired as a policeman, assists with the murder investigation,

This was the last novel in the Inspector Wexford series, as Rendell died on 2 May 2015, having suffered a stroke earlier that year.
