= The Veiled One =

1988 novel by Ruth Rendell

- First edition (UK)
- Author: Ruth Rendell
- Language: English
- Series: Inspector Wexford #14
- Genre: Crime/mystery novel
- Publisher: Hutchinson (UK); Pantheon Books (US)
- Publication date: 1988
- Publication place: United Kingdom
- Media type: Print (hardback & paperback)
- Pages: 278 pp
- ISBN: 0-09-173469-X
- OCLC: 59049080
- Preceded by: An Unkindness of Ravens
- Followed by: Kissing the Gunner's Daughter

The Veiled One is a novel by British crime-writer Ruth Rendell. It is the 14th entry in the Inspector Wexford series.
