= The Copper Peacock =

Short story collection by Ruth Rendell

- First edition (UK)
- Author: Ruth Rendell
- Language: English
- Genre: Crime, mystery
- Publisher: Hutchinson (UK); Mysterious Press (US)
- Publication date: 4 April 1991
- Publication place: United Kingdom
- Media type: Print (hardback & paperback)

The Copper Peacock and Other Stories is a short story collection by British writer Ruth Rendell.

== Contents ==
The collection contains nine stories:

1. "A Pair of Yellow Lillies"
2. "Paperwork"
3. "Mother's Help"
4. "Long Live the Queen"
5. "Dying Happy"
6. "The Copper Peacock"
7. "Weeds"
8. "The Fish-Sitter"
9. "An Unwanted Woman" (an Inspector Wexford story)
