= Lilly Mattock =

Fictional character from the BBC soap opera EastEnders

- EastEnders character
- Portrayed by: Barbara Keogh
- Duration: 1998–1999
- First appearance: Episode 1691; 5 November 1998
- Last appearance: Episode 1828; 2 September 1999
- Introduced by: Matthew Robinson
In-universe information
- Occupation: Retired
- Husband: Jack Temple (backstory)

Lilly Mattock is a fictional character from the BBC soap opera EastEnders, played by Barbara Keogh from 5 November 1998 to 2 September 1999. Lilly likes to forget her age and concentrate on having fun. She has a rude awakening when she is mugged in 1999, and fun-loving Lilly is never quite the same again.

== Character creation and development ==
The character Lilly Mattock, played by Barbara Keogh, was introduced in November 1998 by the executive producer, Matthew Robinson. Lilly was one of several characters introduced in the latter part of 1998, redressing the cast balance following Robinson's decision to axe a large proportion of characters, earlier in the year.

Lilly was brought in as an elderly companion for the long-running character Dot Cotton, played by June Brown; the characters move in together following the destruction of their block of flats. Described as "the silver-haired gossip", Lilly was intended to be a "comedy double act" with Dot, taking over the place of Dot's former sparring partner, Ethel Skinner (Gretchen Franklin). Storylines concentrate on the obvious personality differences between Dot and Lilly, and the problems this causes. The majority of Lilly's storylines are comic, for which she has been praised by Merle Brown, critic for the Daily Record. She is also used to highlight a more serious issue, when in 1999 she is mugged by a criminal called Gareth, and subsequently becomes agoraphobic, refusing to go out. Though she eventually gets over this with Dot's assistance.

Lilly's backstory was revealed in her official biography on the BBC website, told from the character's perspective:

Did I tell you that I used to be a dancer for the Westwood Girls? We used to tour Europe and the Far East performing for the troops. They were a great bunch of friends. We used to go to wild parties, drink champagne and be courted by handsome admirers. Of course, that was before I married my Jack. He was our manager and such a gentleman, he always treated me like a lady. We had 24 wonderful years together until he died of a heart attack. It's quite ironic really. We moved to Spain so that he could start to take things easy but he never could keep still. After all that I got a job performing on a cruise liner, which led to an opening in London booking other acts. I guess you could say I've spent most of my life in the entertainment business. Well, up until now - there's not much call for my kind of entertainment any more.

=== Departure ===
In September 1999, Lilly Mattock became the 26th character to be axed from EastEnders by Matthew Robinson, less than a year after her arrival. The character was never given an official exit, and was just quietly dropped from the serial, making her last appearance on 2 September 1999. In the storyline she has an argument with Dot after blurting out in The Queen Victoria public house that Mark Fowler (Todd Carty) is HIV positive. A few weeks later, Dot is seen moving into the house of Pauline Fowler (Wendy Richard), citing irreconcilable differences with Lilly. The decision to axe Lilly was reportedly prompted by actress June Brown, who plays Dot. Brown had allegedly complained that the comedy double act between Dot and Lilly was not right. A BBC insider told The People newspaper "[Dot and Lilly were] supposed to be two pensioners providing comedy scenes but June thought it was rubbish. She even threatened to walk out but now she's staying on with the promise of better storylines". Actress Barbara Keogh was said to be "devastated" by the decision.

== Storylines ==
Lilly was a former hoofer with the Westwood Girls (a showgirl), performing throughout Europe and the Far East at the close of World War II. She was married to Jack Temple, manager of the Westwood Girls, until he died in 1983. She arrives in Albert Square in 1998 when she moves into a flat with fellow senior-citizen Dot Cotton (June Brown) when both of their respective homes burn down.

Lilly's fun-loving, cheeky personality is in stark contrast to Dot's and the two often wind each other up with their obvious personality differences. She once even tries to persuade Dot that Jeff Healy (Leslie Schofield) has amorous intentions towards her, which has Dot in a bit of a fluster. She is also the first known person in the Square, before Jeff himself, to refer to her consistently as "Dorothy".

Lilly is never one to let her age spoil her fun and she often gives the youngsters of Walford a run for their money by clubbing in e20, trouncing Huw Edwards (Richard Elis) and Lenny Wallace (Desune Coleman) at a game of poker and making an exhibition of herself in salsa classes. Her penchant for late-night clubbing even prompts owner Steve Owen (Martin Kemp) to bar her from his club, for fear that she will upstage his younger clientele.

Lilly works for Terry (Gavin Richards) and Irene Raymond (Roberta Taylor) at the First Til' Last grocery store, and when coming home from one of her late shifts she is mugged by an armed youth. After this ordeal, Lilly becomes a recluse, not wanting to go out for fear of being attacked again. Suddenly faced with her own fragility, Lilly is forced to deal with the realisation that she isn't as strong or independent as she thought. It takes many months for Lilly to face the outside world and her personality is changed forever as a result.

Lilly and Dot's differences soon begin to take their toll and in 1999, Lilly makes the decision to leave Walford and move into sheltered accommodation when the insurance cheque for her flat comes through, leaving Dot to move in with Pauline Fowler (Wendy Richard).
