= Blood Lines (short story collection) =

1995 short story by Ruth Rendell

Blood Lines: Long and Short Stories
- First edition (UK)
- Author: Ruth Rendell
- Language: English
- Genre: Crime/Mystery
- Publisher: Hutchinson (UK); Crown (US)
- Publication date: 1995
- Publication place: United Kingdom
- Media type: Print (hardback & paperback)
- ISBN: 0517193191

Blood Lines: Long and Short Stories is a 1995 short story collection by British writer Ruth Rendell.

== Contents ==
The volume contains 9 short stories and 2 longer novellas:

1. Blood Lines (novella - Inspector Wexford)
2. Lizzie's Lover
3. Shreds and Slivers
4. Burning End
5. The Man Who Was The God Of Love
6. The Carer
7. Expectations
8. Clothes
9. Unacceptable Levels
10. In All Honesty
11. The Strawberry Tree (novella)
