= An Unkindness of Ravens =

Murder mystery by Ruth Rendell

- First edition (UK)
- Author: Ruth Rendell
- Language: English
- Series: Inspector Wexford #13
- Genre: Crime / Mystery novel
- Publisher: Hutchinson (UK); Pantheon Books (US)
- Publication date: 15 April 1985
- Publication place: United Kingdom
- Media type: Print (Hardcover)
- Pages: 269 pp
- ISBN: 0-09-160200-9
- OCLC: 59083767
- Preceded by: The Speaker of Mandarin
- Followed by: The Veiled One

An Unkindness of Ravens is a murder mystery by British crime-writer Ruth Rendell. First published in 1985, it is the 13th in her series featuring Inspector Wexford.

== Plot ==
Inspector Wexford is asked to look into the disappearance of his Kingsmarkham neighbour, Rodney Williams. Since Joy Williams is dowdy, Wexford assumes at first that her middle-aged husband has simply left her for someone younger and more attractive. Three weeks later, when Williams' abandoned car is found vandalised in a nearby town and the suitcase of clothes he had left home with is discovered in a field pool, Wexford starts to suspect that there may have been a murder.

It eventually emerges that Williams was a bigamist who had been dividing his time between one home in Kingsmarkham and a second in the neighbouring town of Pomfret. Years before, he had married sixteen-year old Wendy there and now has a fifteen-year-old daughter Veronica, in addition to the eighteen-year-old Sara in his other home in Kingsmarkham. The two wives only find out about each other after Williams' body is discovered in a shallow grave. He has died from multiple stab wounds.

Things become more complicated when a number of young men are stabbed by teenaged girls belonging to a radical feminist group called ARRIA, whose logo is a human-headed raven. This has a large following in the local girls' schools, including those attended by relatives and friends of the two Williams families. One girl mentions to Wexford that it was not true that the two families did not know of each other since she had seen "those two women" together months before. However, intensive interviewing of Joy and Wendy Williams brings no confession, although the murder weapon is discovered plastered into a redecorated wall in Wendy’s living room.

After an ARRIA member whom he has interviewed is discovered strangled in the garden of the house where they hold their meetings, Wexford finally realises that someone in the group must have been involved in the Williams murder. His suspicion turns to Sara Williams, who claims she was raped by her father when younger, since she has the motive for hating him. Wexford baits a trap for Sara, using her half-sister Veronica, and it emerges that it was these two "women" (in the eyes of ARRIA) who had been meeting secretly for months. Sara is a fantasist who had used the excuse of warning Veronica against her father to dominate her and had then used her as an accomplice in helping dispose of Williams' body once she had murdered him.

== Reactions ==
The convoluted plot and particularly the portrayal of the radical feminist teenagers was deprecated by some reviewers. Kirkus Reviews found the story a "disappointment" because "Rendell overdoes just about everything here". It also commented on the "often-dated feminist themes". Ruth Rendell later reported in an interview with Anthea Davey for Red Pepper that she had "had a go at dotty militant feminism" in An Unkindness of Ravens and as a result "I was described by one women's magazine as the greatest anti-feminist since Dashiell Hammett".

The novel was later dramatised for television as part of The Ruth Rendell Mysteries in November 1990 and has since been repeated.
