= Bloodlines (Alex Faith album) =

Studio album by Alex Faith
- Released: October 30, 2015
- Genre: Christian hip hop, Southern hip hop
- Length: 46:46
- Label: Collision

Alex Faith chronology
ATLast (2013)	Bloodlines (2015)

Bloodlines is the second studio album from Alex Faith. Collision Records released the album on October 30, 2015.

== Critical reception ==
Professional ratings
Review scores
Source	Rating
Cross Rhythms	8/10 squares
Jesus Freak Hideout	3.5/5 stars
New Release Today	4.5/5 stars

Awarding the album three and a half stars at Jesus Freak Hideout, Kevin Hoskins states, "Bloodlines is a little simplistic in its production and lyrical content." Dwayne Lacy, giving the album four and a half stars from New Release Today, writes, "Bloodlines is the album that hip hop needs". Rating the album an eight out of ten for Cross Rhythms, Steve Hayes says, "while throughout great production and inventive flows keep our attention."

== Track listing ==
No.	Title	Writer(s)	Producers	Length
1.	"Lost" (featuring Christian Lewis)	Stephen Alex Faith, Christian Lewis, David James	Courtney Orlando, David James	4:26
2.	"Freedom" (featuring Courtney Orlando)	Faith, Courtney Peebles	Courtney Orlando	4:17
3.	"Dark Matters" (featuring Adan Bean)	Faith, Adan Bean, Peebles	Courtney Orlando	4:22
4.	"ClayCo" (featuring J. Monty)	Faith, Jordan Montgomery, Brian D. Montgomery	Vikaden	5:14
5.	"Bloodlines" (Body Bag Interlude)	Faith, Vintage Savage	Courtney Orlando	3:28
6.	"Never Let Me Down" (featuring Joseph Solomon)	Faith, Joseph Solomon, Peebles	Courtney Orlando	4:10
7.	"95 Atlanta" (featuring Corey Paul)	Faith, Corey Davis, Peebles	Courtney Orlando	4:10
8.	"Pressure" (featuring Justword)	Faith, Ramon Binns II, Peebles	Courtney Orlando	3:48
9.	"Conversations" (featuring Jocelyn Bowman)	Faith, Savage, Jocelyn Bowman, Allen Swoope	Swoope	4:12
10.	"Stillborn"	Faith, Peebles	Courtney Orlando	4:13
11.	"Sins of My Youth"	Faith, Nelson Chu	DJ Official	4:26
Total length:				46:46

== Chart performance ==
Chart (2015)	Peak position
US Christian Albums (Billboard)	18
US Heatseekers Albums (Billboard)	12
