= Joan Hooley =

British actress (born 1936)

- Born: 13 November 1936 (age 89); Manchester, Lancashire, United Kingdom
- Occupation: Character actor
- Notable credit(s): EastEnders (1998–2000); Off Their Rockers (2015–2016)
- Spouse: Geoff Harris (m. 2002; died 2004)

Joan Hooley (born 13 November 1936) is a British actress. She is best known for playing the role of Josie McFarlane in the BBC's EastEnders, but has also appeared in other television programmes since the mid-1950s, such as ITV's Off Their Rockers.

== Career ==
Hooley first appeared on television in the 1950s. She was cast in the ITV hospital soap opera Emergency Ward 10 and appeared in the series in 1964. She played Dr Louise Mahler, who embarked on an interracial relationship with a white doctor, Giles Farmer (played by John White), which included what was long-thought to have been the first interracial kiss on television. A love scene between the two characters was rewritten because it was considered "a little too suggestive". She has commented, "I suddenly found myself in the papers under the headline: 'Black and White TV Kiss Banned'. It was very upsetting and it hit my self-esteem. My part suddenly evaporated and Dr Mahler was sent back to Africa on a holiday where she was bitten by a snake and died. What an exit!"

Her other credits include roles in No Hiding Place (1961), Danger Man (1965), Special Branch (1969), as Umma in C.A.B. (1988), The Bill (1988; 1993), Bugs (1995) and Kavanagh QC (1997). In 1998 she was cast as Josie McFarlane, the mother of Mick McFarlane (Sylvester Williams), in the BBC soap opera EastEnders. The character was introduced by executive producer Matthew Robinson, but in November 1999 it was announced that Hooley's character was being dropped.

She made her final appearance in episodes transmitted in February 2000. Since leaving the serial, Hooley has publicly accused EastEnders and the BBC of racism and tokenism, for giving her character no significant storylines, and using her like a prop. In 2000 she commented, "It was very demeaning and a form of insidious racism. That is a very strong phrase to use against the BBC and EastEnders but I feel very badly about how they handled my character. They were just fulfilling a duty to have a black face in the show."

Hooley subsequently had roles in Urban Gothic (2000), Doctors (2004), and Respectable (2006), among others. As well as acting, Hooley has written scripts for the Channel 4 sitcom Desmond's.

In 2015, Hooley joined the cast of ITV's Off Their Rockers as one of the pranksters. She starred in Season 5, Episode 4 of BBC's Death in Paradise, which aired on 28 January 2016.

== Personal life ==
In 2002, at the age of 65, Hooley married actor Geoffrey Harvard Harris, known for his portrayal of Charles Dickens in his one-man Dickens show. They met and became a couple in 1993, and remained together until Harris' death from cancer in 2004.
