= Troy Titus-Adams =

British actress

Troy Titus-Adams (born Troy Johanna D. Adams, October 1969) is a British actress and dancer. She began her career touring as a dancer and made her feature film debut in Knights and Emeralds (1986). She is known for her roles in the soap operas EastEnders (1999–2000) as Nina Harris and Family Affairs (2000) as Kim Davis. She also appeared on the game show Blankety Blank (2001).

== Early life ==
Titus-Adams is from Islington, North London. She was born to Jamaican father Joe Titus, a builder, and English mother Maggie Adams, a secretary at a London hospice. Her parents split when she was six, and she spent four years until she was ten in Amsterdam. Titus-Adams attended George Orwell Comprehensive School and took after-school acting classes at the Italia Conti Academy of Theatre Arts. She also modeled.

== Filmography ==
Year	Title	Role	Notes
1986	Knights and Emeralds		
1989	The Rachel Papers	Woman	
1999–2000	EastEnders	Nina Harris	97 episodes
2000	Family Affairs	Kim Davis	30 episodes
2001	Blankety Blank	Herself	Series 16
2003	True Brit		
2005	The Trouble with Men and Women		
2005	In the Back	Host	Short film
2006	The Bill	Letitia Dwyer	Episode: "Hit the Ground Running"
2007	Intergalactic Combat	Trojan	
2007	NUMB3RS	Dr Patricia Stone	Episode: "Robin Hood"
2009	Boulevard Zen	Kat	
2015	The Grid	Tina Marvine	Short film

== Stage ==
Year	Title	Role	Notes
????	Starlight Express	Wrench	Apollo Victoria Theatre, London
2001	Strange Kind of Hero	Mary Magdalene	Edinburgh Fringe Festival, Edinburgh / Cheltenham Racecourse, Cheltenham
2001–2002	Jack and the Beanstalk	Princess Jasmin	Millfield Theatre, Enfield
2007	The Wedding Dance	Kathleen	Everyman Theatre, Liverpool / Octagon Theatre, Bolton
2011	Dolls! Not Your Usual Love Story		Santa Monica Playhouse, Los Angeles
