= Murder Being Once Done =

1972 novel by Ruth Rendell

- Author: Ruth Rendell
- Language: English
- Series: Inspector Wexford #7
- Genre: Crime, Mystery novel
- Publisher: Hutchinson (UK); The Crime Club (US)
- Publication date: 17 July 1972
- Publication place: United Kingdom
- Media type: Print (Hardback & Paperback)
- Pages: 192 pp
- ISBN: 0-09-111600-7
- OCLC: 694262
- Dewey Decimal: 823/.9/14
- LC Class: PZ4.R4132 Mu PR6068.E63
- Preceded by: No More Dying Then
- Followed by: Some Lie and Some Die

Murder Being Once Done is a novel by British crime-writer Ruth Rendell, first published in 1972. It is the seventh entry in her popular Inspector Wexford series.

== Reception ==
Lenore Glen Offord of the San Francisco Examiner wrote: "Highly interesting cross-section of English middle class life provides the basis for the straight-detection item, with all the fine characterizations and surprises that one expects of Rendell." The Lewiston Evening Journal called it a "fine example of brilliant characterization, neat plotting realism and pace to command the fullest possible attention of the reader from the first paragraph to the final punctuation mark." Ruth Vastine of The Press of Atlantic City stated: "There are sections of the book which describe the countryside and other various locations and some of these are overdone. Nonetheless, the story is a very involving and successful who-done-it."
