= Nina Harris =

Fictional character from the BBC soap opera EastEnders

- EastEnders character
- Portrayed by: Troy Titus-Adams
- Duration: 1999–2000
- First appearance: Episode 1724; 14 January 1999
- Last appearance: Episode 1957; 5 June 2000
- Introduced by: Matthew Robinson
In-universe information
- Occupation: Barmaid
- Father: Sydney Harris
- Mother: Jenny Harris
- Aunts: Irene Raymond
- First cousins: Tony Hills; Sarah Hills
- Other relatives: Maureen Carter

Nina Harris is a fictional character from the BBC soap opera EastEnders, played by Troy Titus-Adams between 14 January 1999 and 5 June 2000. The character was axed by John Yorke, making her final appearance in June 2000. Titus-Adams has been critical about the lack of material given to her, accusing the BBC of tokenism.

== Creation and development ==
Nina Harris was introduced in 1999 by executive producer Matthew Robinson. Former model Troy Titus-Adams was given the role after initially being lined up to audition for the part of Lisa Shaw, which eventually went to Lucy Benjamin. She has commented, "the EastEnders role came out of the blue. My agent called me while I was in the US, to tell me that they were look for new characters, so I flew back for an audition. Initially I auditioned for the role of market inspector Lisa (played by Lucy Benjamin), but was offered the part of Nina".

She has claimed that she only accepted the part after persuasion from the show's producers who convinced her Nina would be a positive role model for black women: "A lot of my friends and family are West Indian and Afro-Caribbean, so I do feel a sense of responsibility. I spoke to the producers because I wondered how they were going to tackle certain issues and how many black writers were on the show. I was concerned about why a black person had to be an ex-prostitute. But what's good about Nina is that she has turned her life around. She's come from being in care when she was younger and arrived in Walford to work in the bar and study for a degree."

The character was axed by John Yorke in 2000. Titus-Adams has since reflected on her time in the soap, saying, "Being in EastEnders was a fantastic experience and I loved playing Nina. Even now people come up to me and tell me how much they liked the character. So it was a shame when my contract came to an end and they didn't renew it."

== Storylines ==
Nina arrives in Walford looking for a fresh start away from her past as a prostitute. Nina had helped imprison her violent pimp Vinny, a former boyfriend who had got her addicted to drugs and then persuaded her to turn to prostitution so she could feed their habit. She stays with aunt Irene Raymond (Roberta Taylor) and settles in by becoming a barmaid in The Queen Victoria public house.

Nina had been neglected as a child by her mother Jenny, Irene's sister, and her troubled past fuels her ambition to become a probation officer; she studies hard to achieve this goal. While in Albert Square her good looks do not go unnoticed by the male population as she moves in with good friend and admirer Beppe di Marco (Michael Greco), then starts dating his enemy Grant Mitchell (Ross Kemp), who is smitten with her. The two men come to blows when Nina's past is revealed by an ex-client called Dean Collins (Keith-Lee Castle) who has been blackmailing her. Grant reacts in disgust; he tells the rest of Walford about Nina's past and their relationship ends with no hope of a reconciliation.

A few months later she dates Mick McFarlane (Sylvester Williams) but has to leave the Square behind to look after her dying father who has been absent most of her life. Nina knows it is the right thing to do; she bids farewell to her friends and family and leaves for good.

== Reception ==
Actress Titus-Adams accused the BBC of treating her like a "token black" while she appeared in EastEnders. She claimed that she gave up the opportunity of a "wonderful life" by moving from the US to the UK to accept the part of Nina - a decision she regretted in hindsight.

Titus-Adams claimed that, before she accepted the part, she had been given the impression Nina would be a strong individual, but ultimately, she was unhappy with the direction the writers took the character. In a newspaper interview in 2000, she recalled: "I was e-mailed a biography of Nina and I stayed up all night reading about this amazingly strong character. I'd been told Nina was gritty with a great background". However Titus-Adams was disappointed when Nina "turned into a barmaid who was an ex-prostitute who just stood there and polished glasses all day." The actress believed that Nina was stereotyped and that she as well as other black actors on the cast of EastEnders at the time, were victims of tokenism. She stated, "[Black characters] always have a shady past. So, surprise, surprise, [Nina] became a prostitute. All black actors seem to be token blacks. And I ended up feeling like that - an outsider [...] If you look at the background of someone like Sylvester Williams, who plays Mick McFarlane, it's amazing. He's done great theatre. He's been on the show for four years [in the year 2000] and they have wasted him. Has he ever been at the forefront of anything? He's very under-used. Black actors just get piddly little scenes. They are surplus to requirements."

Titus-Adams felt that the reason her character was written-out was because Ross Kemp who played Nina's love interest Grant Mitchell had decided to quit the soap opera. She commented, "There was nowhere left for me to go after he went. I was so excited when I learned that Nina was to be involved with Grant because he was the show's biggest character [...] but in the event it was the beginning of the end. After the affair with [Grant] there was nothing for [Nina]."

It was initially reported that Titus-Adams had quit the show, but she revealed to the press in 2000 that she had actually been axed by executive producer John Yorke.

Titus-Adams claimed that she received much fan mail from young Black, mixed-race and Asian women, who saw her as a role model. However, she added that she was disappointed with her exit from the show saying, "it would have been great if [Nina] could have stayed and developed [her] relationship with Mick, and who knows, [they] might have formed a Black family."
