= Dre Murray =

American rapper

- Born: Andre' Ledarryl Murray; September 14, 1981 (age 44); Houston, Texas, U.S.
- Origin: Houston, Texas, U.S.
- Genres: Hip hop, Christian hip hop
- Occupations: Songwriter, rapper, producer
- Instrument: Vocals
- Years active: 2003–present
- Label: Collision Records
- Website: dremurray.com

Andre' Ledarryl Murray, better known by the stage name Dre Murray, (born September 14, 1981) is an American hip hop artist born and raised in Houston, Texas. He is a member of the rap collective We Live As Kings (W.L.A.K.).

== Biography ==
Murray was born Andre' Ledarryl Murray on September 14, 1981, in Houston, Texas, to Andrew Lee Murray and Marjorie Ann Murray (née Jones). He currently lives in Oklahoma with his wife and three children.

In 2008, Murray released his first album entitled Manumit. Between 2009 and 2011, Murray along with Wit created a series entitled Hell's Paradise. In 2012, Dre Murray signed to Collision Records, and became part of the Christian hip hop collective W.L.A.K. In 2013, Murray released his second studio album, Gold Rush: Maybe One Day, with Collision Records.

He released, Southern Lights: Overexposed, with Alex Faith on April 28, 2015 by Collision Records as well as "Southern Lights Remix" also with Alex Faith and was produced by Cardec Drums and features John Givez, JGivens, Corey Paul and Tragic Hero and sampled "Lights" by Ellie Goulding.

== Discography ==
Studio albums

Title	Album details	Peak chart positions				
Title	Album details	US 200	US CHR	US GOS	US IND	US RAP
Manumit	Released: 2008					
Gold Rush: Maybe One Day	Released: July 9, 2013; Label: Collision; CD, digital download	189	8	6	38	15
34	Released: November 27, 2015; Label: Collision; CD, digital download	—	38	—	46	—
