= Taelor Gray =

American Christian hip hop musician (born 1984)

- Born: Taelor Eugene Gray; June 2, 1984 (age 42); Columbus, Ohio, U.S.
- Genres: Christian hip hop
- Occupations: Singer, songwriter
- Instruments: Vocals, singer-songwriter
- Years active: 2015–present
- Website: taelorgray.com

Taelor Eugene Gray (born June 2, 1984) is an American Christian hip hop musician. He was part of The Elevationists with his brother, Christon Gray, and James Hazley, before they started their solo musical endeavors. His first studio album, The Mocker and the Monarch, was released in 2015, independently.

== Early life ==
Taelor Eugene Gray was born on June 2, 1984, in Columbus, Ohio, the son of Arthur Leroy Gray Jr. and Leigh Ann Gray (née, Wilson), with his younger brother, Christon Gray, where they were raised in a Charismatic Pentecostal Church, in particularly the chorale ministry. He was educated in private schools from kindergarten through the eighth grade, when he went to and graduated from Groveport Madison High School. Gray graduated from Ohio State University in 2006.

== Music career ==
His music recording career began in 2015, with the studio album, The Mocker and the Monarch, that was released on September 4, 2015, from Taelor Gray Records.

== Personal life ==
Gray is married to Elizabeth "Liz" Gray, and they have a son, Levi and daughter, Chloe. He is the pastor at Linden Life Fellowship.

== Discography ==
Studio albums

- Find A Way To Smile Again (2022)
- Remember the Sabath (2021)
- New Peace (2021)
- Touch Not Mine Anointed (2020)
- Jacob and Judas (2019)
- The Love Don't Last Long (2018)
- In the Way of Me (2017)
- The Mocker and the Monarch (September 4, 2015, independent)
- The Straw Man (2013)
