= Alex Faith =

American rapper

- Born: December 27, 1989 (age 36); Atlanta, Georgia, U.S.
- Origin: Atlanta, Georgia, U.S.
- Genres: Christian hip hop, Urban contemporary gospel
- Occupations: Singer, songwriter, rapper
- Instrument: Vocals
- Years active: 2009–present
- Label: Collision Records
- Website: alexfaith.bandcamp.com

Alex Faith (born December 27, 1989) is an American hip hop singer-songwriter born and raised between the Cabbagetown enclave of Atlanta, Georgia and Riverdale, just south of Atlanta. He was formerly a member of the rap collective W.L.A.K.

== Background ==
Alex Faith was born on December 27, 1989, in Riverdale, Georgia and raised in the Cabbagetown community.

== History ==
Faith first appeared on Sho Baraka's Barakology mixtape in 2009. He is a member of the collective W.L.A.K. In 2012, Faith released a mixtape entitled Honest 2 God. In 2013, Faith released his first studio album with Collision Records entitled ATLast. His second studio album, Bloodlines, was released on October 30, 2015, from Collision Records.

He released, Southern Lights: Overexposed, with Dre Murray on April 28, 2015, by Collision Records.

== Discography ==
Studio albums

List of studio albums, with selected chart positions
Title	Album details	Peak chart positions					
Title	Album details	US 200	US CHR	US GOS	US IND	US RAP	US HEAT
ATLast	Released: November 5, 2013; Label: Collision; CD, digital download	193	12	4	27	16	–
Bloodlines	Released: October 30, 2015; Label: Collision; CD, digital download	–	18	–	–	–	12
