= Christon Gray =

American rapper

Background information
- Also known as: Flow Jackson
- Born: Christon Michael Gray; July 18, 1986 (age 40); Columbus, Ohio, U.S.
- Genres: Contemporary R&B, Christian hip hop
- Occupations: Singer, rapper
- Years active: 2006–present
- Labels: Fo Yo Soul/RCA, Collision Records
- Website: christongray.com

Christon Michael Gray (born 18 July 1986) is an American R&B singer and rapper born and raised in Columbus, Ohio. He calls his music "about being human." It is this approach that has allowed him a successful transition from Christian music to mainstream.

== Background ==
Gray was born Christon Michael Gray on July 18, 1986, in Columbus, Ohio. His parents, Arthur Gray (a former choir leader) and his mother, Leigh Ann (a trained soprano), have two other children; Christon's older brother, Taelor Gray, who is also a rapper and pastor, and his younger sister Aubrey, who is currently a college student. He resides in Cincinnati, Ohio, with his wife, Shana Gray, and has a daughter from a previous marriage, named Mya Blue. On February 22, 2020, they welcomed a baby girl, Story Monroe Gray.

== Music career ==
=== 2006–2011: Elevationists and EWEWM ===
In 2006, Gray was a part of The Elevationists with his brother, Taelor, and childhood friend BJ (James Hazley). After a few years together, they disbanded the group.

In 2011, Gray, with the help of writing partner and music director Marlo Scott, released an album entitled Even With Evil With Me. The independent release spawned the timeless track 'Isle of You', which quickly led to record label interest. Before the year was out, he was signed to Collision Records.

=== 2012–2014: Collision Records and School of Roses ===
In 2012, he began working on his retail and label debut for Collision, but as it morphed, he decided to release it as a free mixtape. Body Art was a hit among Gray's fans and featured the label's roster and other artists and producers from the CHH genre. It caught many fans off guard because it was more of a rap album than EWEWM, which was the album's intention.

Early in 2013, the label released the collective album We Live As Kings (W.L.A.K.). As a member of the four-man group, Christon was featured on the majority of the tracks. The album went on to top the Billboard Gospel chart and crack the top 10 on the Rap and Christian charts. It also contained the cut 'King in Me', which was used as the theme song to American Idol's Super Bowl commercial in 2014.

On March 25, 2014, Gray released his 2nd studio album entitled School of Roses. It included fan favorites 'Vanish' (feat. Swoope) and 'Wanna' (feat. JGivens), which peaked at No. 15 on the Billboard Live Trending chart. This was more of an R&B album than Body Art, and it debuted at the top of the overall charts on iTunes and hit No. 44 on the Billboard Top 200 and No. 5 on Top R&B Albums.

=== 2015–January 2017: FYS/RCA and The Glory Album ===
In early 2015, Gray began releasing music on his own, prompting fans to question whether or not he was still a part of Collision and W.L.A.K. The first track, 'Open Door (See You Later),' was posted on his SoundCloud page in March 2015. Still not addressing his status, one week later he posted the beautiful piano-led love ballad, 'Afraid With You'. Lastly, he posted 'Light On' featuring B.Reith the following week. On April 28, 2015, after confirming he was leaving Collision in an interview with Wade-O & Rapzilla, Gray released an EP called The Demos to be streamed exclusively on the Christian music-streaming app, "The Overflow". The album went on to be the most streamed project on the entire service for 2015, with all 5 tracks occupying spots No. 1 – No. 5 the week of its release.

It became clear that he was using these songs to get himself a new record deal, and in June 2015, he revealed that he had signed with Kirk Franklin's label, Fo Yo Soul Recordings/RCA. Kirk himself made the announcement via video screen at Alive Fest in Ohio on June 20, 2015. He subsequently removed The Demos to work on his third retail album and label debut.

On November 18, 2015, Rapzilla.com released an interview via email with Gray in which he said his debut with Fo Yo Soul had been completed and was being scheduled for release during "the colder part of 2016".

A few weeks later, on December 2, 2015, Gray released a freestyle video that included the name and release date of his next project, The Glory Album. Gray's debut album with Fo Yo Soul/RCA was set to be released on March 11, 2016.

Two weeks after that, he debuted the first new track off the album on Vevo called 'Connor McDees' featuring Brooklyn emcee, Skyzoo and his brother Taelor.

Leading up to the album release, he was chosen as one of ESPN's Artists of the Month for March. The station highlighted three tracks, "Open Door (See You Later)", "The Glory Pt. I", and "Stop Me" on all of their regular programming. The latter track went on to be used in commercials for Honda, HBO's Ballers, FOX's Lethal Weapon & RocNation Sports. It was also used at the ESPY Awards during the show's final segment. The remix of the song debuted during his interview on the Sway in the Morning show in mid-September 2016. The song continued success in 2017, being used on FOX Sports programming worldwide, as well as the team song for a number of professional sports franchises. In 2018, the song was the theme to Warner Bros Pictures blockbuster 'Rampage' starring The Rock and as the intro song to EA Sports 'Madden '19' NFL Video game. For the 2018–19 NBA Season, ESPN is using the song for its in NBA Studio show. In 2020, it was used by ABC in some commercials for their show 'For Life'.

Also during this time, Apple Music selected 'Open Door (See You Later)' and 'Ft. Knox' as 'Best of the Week' singles back to back. As well, TGA received key placements on Amazon Music, iTunes, Google Play, TIDAL, and Spotify.

The Glory Album was released on March 11, 2016. The LP went on to again claim the No. 5 position on the Billboard R&B charts while also hitting No. 6 on the Christian chart.

Gray was chosen as the first-ever youth ambassador for the BET Awards in June 2016.

After just one album with the label, Gray let fans know that he had officially left RCA in January 2017. He did not elaborate on the reasons but said when the time was right, he would speak about it. According to the post, it was a business decision, and he wishes all parties involved well.

=== 2017: 'No Hesitation' and Return to FYS/RCA Records ===
In March 2017, Gray, along with Chris Shaban started their own Podcast entitled 'Chris' Podcast'. The first two episodes included guests Ty Montgomery, Chris Broussard, and Darren Haynes. Gray mentioned that this was a pilot program and that they were looking to bring it back sometime in 2019.

On July 28, Gray dropped a single called 'No Hesitation' independently. This was his first release since leaving Fo Yo Soul/RCA Records. In an interview with Wade-O, Gray said, "You know the inspiration for the song came from me watching the BET Awards, and I saw 'Crae's speech, and I know he caught some flack for that... I talked to Lecrae the other day, and I told him, I come from that world... I grew up listening to them, and without them, you (Wade) would not be having an interview with me... so I told him (Lecrae), yo, I didn't expect you to go back and apologize, so I did it for you." The song would become another hit for Gray, and he went on to perform it live at the 2018 Stellar Awards.

A week later, on August 4, he released 'Shoulda Known,' which included a sample of his song, 'Burning House (Roses 102)' off the School of Roses album. It featured long-time collaborator and friend JGivens.

On Sunday, November 5, Christon Gray was announced as the new Worship Leader at Christ's Church in Mason, Ohio.

By the end of the year, an agreement had been reached for him to rejoin Fo Yo Soul and the new staff at RCA Inspiration in Nashville. It would not become public until later on in 2018.

=== 2018: Clear The Heir ===
By the end of 2017 and leading into 2018, Gray let fans know that he was back writing but did not elaborate. There weren't indications until a post on Instagram in February with Chris Shaban and Ty Montgomery, taken from a writing session in Cambridge, Ontario. He would later go on to tell that four songs were already written by this point, with two making the album, 'Seekrets' and 'Together Forever.'

In March, there came a string of posts from the studio that included MD and producer Marlo Scott, Producer GiAngelo Power, Pastor Trevor DeVage, Montgomery, and Shaban. Gray said in a post on Twitter, "...there was a week in March 2018 when everything started to come together. That week we did 'Grow Up', 'You & I (Sampson's Lament),' and brushed up a few other songs that made the cut." Those other songs were 'Seekrets,' 'Together Forever,' and the instrumental to 'Clear The Heir'.

In April at the Stellar Awards, rumors started swirling that Christon had re-signed with Fo Yo Soul/RCA Records, and while it had happened months before, it was a post with Kirk Franklin that said "Welcome home" that started the buzz. One more studio picture that month and Gray took some time off of his social media and no further updates came until late in the summer.

On August 2, a post from famed Canadian studio Metalworks that read "October 19" and had no sound, but a studio full of his collaborators started his promotion run for the album. Later on, it was revealed that the album's release date would be October 19.

On August 24, he dropped the first single 'Together Forever' with credit going to Fo Yo Soul/Essential Sound/Sony. The track contained a portion of his September 2016 interview on Sirius XM's 'Sway in the Morning' where he discussed divorce.

On September 14, he released the album's second single 'Time Out', produced by Toronto's GiAngelo Power. That instrumental had come from a writing session with JGivens in November 2016. The song would go on to be featured on Spotify's 'Beastmode' Playlist and peak at No. 11 on Urban Christian CHR radio BDS reporting list, 'The Hot Chart'. It would spend 6 months on that chart.

On September 21, RCA released the music video for 'Time Out' and it featured a host of Christian athletes including Ty Montgomery, Mike Conley, A.J. Styles, Steven Sousa Jr., Andre Ward, Michelle Plouffe, and more. The song's co-writer and video director, Chris Shaban, said, "Growing up as a Christian kid (in Toronto), I was always inspired by athletes who excelled at a high level and love Jesus, so we decided we'd like to try and motivate the next generation the same way." It was accompanied by the #TimeOutChallenge that asked fans to rap over the song's instrumental, with the winner receiving a signed pair of Jordan Brand shoes from Conley and a signed Green Bay Packers jersey from Montgomery.

On October 12, Gray released the third single from the album, 'Grow Up.' It was immediately added to numerous playlists on Spotify, including 'New Music Friday,' 'New Music Friday Christian,' 'Blessings,' and 'The Flow.'

=== 2019: Winner's Circle ===
One week after the release of Clear The Heir, Christon Gray was once again granted permission to leave RCA. While not speaking specifically about what led to his second request for release, it was granted, and he wished the label success.

A few months later, he dropped the maxi-single, 'Winner's Circle', which featured the tracks 'Round Here' w/ Dee-1 and 'All Day Flow'. He seems to have addressed his label situation on that song with the lines, "Oh mamma mia, mamma mia, don't look so surprised when I see ya. When they pulled my album from the streamers (on release day), denied the label like I'm Peter. Fool me once, I can handle it. Fool me twice, turn my hand to fist, fool me thrice, I'll abandon ship." He released the song to one radio station, BOOST 101.9, in St. Louis, at their request but kept it from other stations. The song peaked at No. 5 on BOOST, spinning more than seven times a day at its peak.

A video for the songs from the 2 track offering was released on May 14, 2020. It features Dee-1's verse from 'Round Here' as well as a full video for 'All Day Flow.' Christian Padron shot the video. It also ends with a teaser for Gray's upcoming album, School of Roses 2, said to be released on Independence Day 2020.

=== 2020: See You Soon, Beautiful Dreamer and The Lead Up For SOR2 ===
On April 17, 2020, Gray dropped a single entitled, 'See You Soon'. According to YouTube, he dropped this song early in the pandemic to be an encouragement, mainly to other people. The blurb asks people to get groceries, call and pray for your neighbors. Mike Conley of the Utah Jazz used the song as part of his donation press release during COVID-19. As of June 15, 2020 the song sat at No. 11 on the Christian CHR and Rhythmic radio chart, and was on major radio in Canada, France, England, Australia, New Zealand, and many other places around the world. Containing a sample from Tracklib, the sample house interviewed the song's producers, Phantom and Chris Shaban, shortly after the release.

On June 11, 2020, Gray posted an album cover and song title, Beautiful Dreamer, for a track to be released on the Juneteenth holiday (June 19).

== Discography ==
Title	Details	US R&B	US Hip Hop/ R&B	US Digital
School of Roses	Released: March 25, 2014 Label: Collision CD, digital download	5	9	13
The Glory Album	Released: March 11, 2016 Label: RCA/ Fo Yo Soul CD, digital download	5	14	22
