= John Long Ltd =

London-based publishing firm

- Status: Defunct
- Founder: John Long
- Successor: Hutchinson
- Country of origin: United Kingdom
- Headquarters location: London

John Long Ltd was a publishing firm based in London and founded by John Long who died on 16 September 1935. John Long Ltd. had a long association with Hutchinson and was eventually incorporated, by the 1960s it had become an imprint of Hutchinson and was no longer in use after the year 1979.
