= Corey Paul =

American musician

- Also known as: Corey Paul
- Born: Corey Paul Davis; March 10, 1987 (age 39); Houston, Texas
- Genres: Christian hip hop, urban contemporary gospel
- Occupations: Singer, songwriter
- Instrument: Vocals
- Years active: 2013–present
- Label: Frontline Movement

Corey Paul Davis (born March 10, 1987), known by the stage name Corey Paul, is an American Christian hip hop musician from Houston, Texas. His debut album, Grace Love Mercy, released on July 30, 2013, by Frontline Media Group. This album was his Billboard chart debut album. In March 2015, Corey Paul was signed onto Collision Records, by December he released his second Billboard charting album, "Today Tomorrow Forever". In July 2017 he announced his departure from Collision Records.

== Early life ==
Corey Paul was born on March 10, 1987, as Corey Paul Davis, in Houston, Texas.

Corey was raised by his mother and his stepfather, who eventually became a crack cocaine addict. At the age of six his father beat and burned his mother with an iron, and by the age of eight he witnessed his mother shoot his father in self-defense. When Corey was nine his father hanged himself in an attic after a long battle with addiction.

As a teenager Corey embraced the street culture, party life and Houston's "chopped and screwed" music scene. Eventually he realized that even if he gained all of it, it wouldn't change the pain, poverty or hopelessness that his family and neighborhood dealt with on a daily basis. It was at this moment Corey decided to trust God and in 2010 he started "Frontline Media Group", a record label that creates and promotes music with a message of hope, positivity and a belief in something greater than the struggle.

== Music career ==
Corey Paul's first album, Grace Love Mercy, was released on July 30, 2013, with Frontline Movement. This was his debut album on the Billboard charts, and it happened to land a placement on Top Gospel Albums at No. 39. He then signed with Collision Records and released his second album, "Today, Tomorrow, Forever," on December 18, 2015. The album peaked at No. 11 on the iTunes Rap/Hip-Hop chart and ranked No. 16 on the Billboard "Heatseeker" chart. He announced his departure from Collision Records in 2017 and then independently released his third album, "Untold Story: Trill Young King" November 11, 2017.

== Personal life ==
Corey Paul is married to Summer, and they are presently residing in Houston, Texas, and attend church at Resurrection Houston

== Discography ==
=== Studio albums ===
List of studio albums, with selected chart positions
Title	Album details	Peak chart positions
Title	Album details	US Gos
Grace Love Mercy	Released: July 30, 2013; Label: Frontline Movement; CD, digital download	39
Today, Tomorrow, Forever	Released: December 18, 2015; Label: Collision; CD, digital download	16
Untold Story: Trill Young King	Released: November 10, 2017; Label: Frontline Media Group; Digital Download	N/A
