= Kampouris =

Kampouris is a surname. Notable people with the surname include:

- Elena Kampouris
- Emmanuel Kampouris
- Alex Kampouris
- Argyris Kampouris

== See also ==
- Tasos Kampouris Kanithou Indoor Hall
