= List of awards and honors received by Nancy Pelosi =

Nancy Pelosi is a prominent American politician who has been Speaker of the United States House of Representatives twice, from 2007 to 2011 and from 2019 to 2023. She was the first woman to serve as Speaker and is considered one of the most consequential House Speakers in American history. During her career, she has received multiple awards and honors in the US and from around the world.

== Foreign honors ==
- Italy :
  - Officer of the Order of Merit of the Italian Republic on June 2, 2001.
  - Grand Cross of the Order of Merit of the Italian Republic on June 2, 2007.
- Japan :
  - Knight Grand Cordon of the Order of the Rising Sun on April 29, 2015.
- Philippines :
  - Grand Cross of the Order of the Golden Heart on June 23, 2008.
- Spain :
  - Dame Grand Cross of the Order of Isabella the Catholic on April 25, 2023.
- Taiwan :
  - Grand Cross, Special Class of the Order of Propitious Clouds on August 3, 2022.
- Ukraine :
  - Member of the Order of Princess Olga on April 30, 2022.
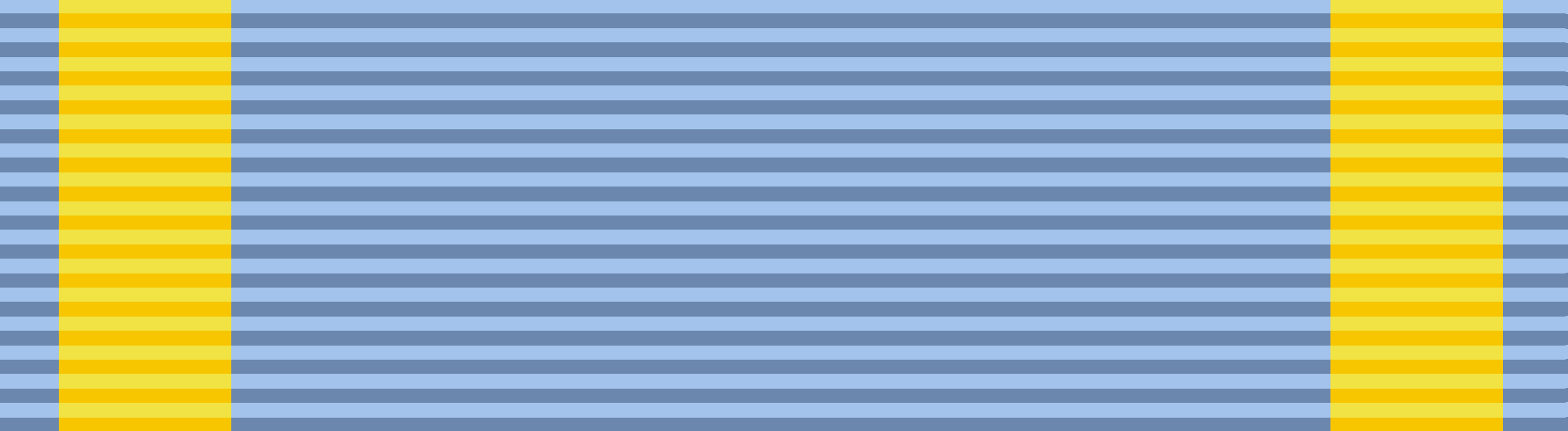
  - Grand Officer of the Order of Prince Yaroslav the Wise on October 21, 2022.

== Academic honors ==
Honorary degrees
Location	Date	School	Honorary degree	Gave commencement speech	Ref.
California	1994	American Conservatory Theater	Master of Fine Arts	No	
Washington, D.C.	May 25, 2002	Georgetown University	Doctor of Laws	Yes	
Massachusetts	May 18, 2003	Brandeis University	Doctor of Laws	Yes	
Massachusetts	May 16, 2004	Simmons University	Doctor of Laws	Yes	
Maryland	May 20, 2005	Goucher College	Doctor of Laws	Yes	
Missouri	May 12, 2007	Webster University	Doctor of Laws	Yes	
California	May 19, 2007	University of San Francisco	Doctor of Laws	Yes	
Florida	May 3, 2008	Miami Dade College	Bachelor of Science in Education	Yes	
Maryland	May 21, 2009	Johns Hopkins University	Doctor of Humane Letters	Yes	
California	May 16, 2010	Mills College	Doctor of Laws	Yes	
New York	May 29, 2010	Cornell University	Doctor of Laws	Yes	
Maryland	May 20, 2013	University of Baltimore School of Law	Doctor of Laws	Yes	
New York	May 24, 2014	Bard College	Doctor of Laws	Yes	
Maryland	May 21, 2016	Morgan State University	Doctor of Laws	Yes	
Tennessee	May 1, 2017	Fisk University	Doctor of Laws	Yes	
Massachusetts	May 20, 2018	Mount Holyoke College	Doctor of Laws	Yes	
California	May 28, 2019	San Francisco State University	Doctor of Laws	Yes	
Massachusetts	September 8, 2021	Smith College	Doctor of Laws	Yes	
Rhode Island	May 29, 2022	Brown University	Doctor of Laws	Yes	
Northern Ireland	March 16, 2023	Ulster University	Doctor of Laws	Yes	
France	Nov 6, 2023	Paris-Panthéon-Assas Université	Doctor of Laws		
Republic of Ireland	April 22, 2024	University College Dublin	Doctor of Laws	Yes	

== Awards, recognitions and accolades ==
- 2006: Barbara Walters's Most Fascinating Person of the year
- 2006: Golden Plate Award of the American Academy of Achievement
- 2007: Glamour Woman of the Year Award
- 2007: TIME 100 Most Influential People
- 2007: National Equality Award, for leading the fight for LGBT rights
- 2008: TIME 100 Most Influential People
- 2009: TIME Person of the Year Runner Up, TIME 100 Most Influential People
- 2010: TIME 100 Most Influential People
- 2010: 11th on the Forbes list of the world's 100 most powerful women
- 2013: Induction into the National Women's Hall of Fame
- 2014: 26th on the Forbes list of the world's 100 most powerful women
- 2016: Foremother Award from the National Center for Health Research
- 2016: Hubert H. Humphrey Civil and Human Rights Award
- 2018: TIME 100 Most Influential People
- 2019: JFK Profile in Courage Award
- 2019: 3rd on the Forbes list of the world's 100 most powerful women
- 2019: Honoree at the VH1 Trailblazer Honors
- 2019: LBJ Liberty & Justice for All Award
- 2019: Robert F Kennedy Ripple of Hope Award
- 2019: TIME 100 Most Influential People
- 2020: TIME 100 Most Influential People
- 2020: TIME 100 Women of the Year, Woman of the Year for 2010 retroactively
- 2020: 7th on Forbes World's Most Powerful Women List
- 2020: Madeleine K. Albright Democracy Award
- 2021: Inaugural Forbes 50 Over 50, a list of notable entrepreneurs, leaders, scientists and creators over age 50
- 2021: Inaugural Women for Peace and Security Prize, an honor awarded by the NATO Parliamentary Assembly
- 2022: 25th on Forbes World's Most Powerful Women List
- 2023: Human Rights & Freedom Defender Prize by Wei Jingsheng Foundation
- 2023: Eleanor Roosevelt Distinguished Leadership Award
- 2023: Freedom Medal by Roosevelt Institute 2023 Four Freedoms Awards
- 2023: Valerie Biden Owens Woman of Power and Purpose Award
- 2024: Induction into the Maryland Women's Hall of Fame
- 2024: James Joyce Award, Literary & Historical Society, University College of Dublin
- 2024: Sutherland Leadership Award
- 2024: Presidential Medal of Freedom
- 2024: Lincoln Medal
- 2024: Democracy Service Medal, National Endowment for Democracy
- 2026: First Citizen Award, awarded by Maryland Senate President Bill Ferguson
