= Bonhoeffer (film) =

Film by Todd Komarnicki

- Theatrical release poster
- Directed by: Todd Komarnicki
- Written by: Todd Komarnicki
- Produced by: Emmanuel Kampouris; Camille Kampouris; Ralph Winter; Mark O'Sullivan; Chloe Kassis-Crowe; John Bennett Scanlon; Todd Komarnicki
- Starring: Jonas Dassler; August Diehl; David Jonsson; Flula Borg; Moritz Bleibtreu; Nadine Heidenreich; Patrick Mölleken; Clarke Peters
- Cinematography: John Mathieson
- Edited by: Blu Murray
- Music by: Antonio Pinto; Gabriel Ferreira
- Production companies: Tharos Films; Crow's Nest Productions; Fontana
- Distributed by: Angel Studios (United States); KOVA (Ireland and United Kingdom)
- Release date: November 22, 2024
- Running time: 132 minutes
- Countries: United States; Belgium; Ireland
- Language: English
- Budget: $25 million
- Box office: $12.6 million

Bonhoeffer (released as Bonhoeffer: Pastor. Spy. Assassin.) is a 2024 historical drama thriller film about the German theologian and anti-Nazi dissident Dietrich Bonhoeffer, written, produced and directed by Todd Komarnicki. It stars Jonas Dassler, August Diehl, David Jonsson, Flula Borg, Moritz Bleibtreu, and Clarke Peters.

The film was released in the United States on November 22, 2024. It attracted some controversy regarding political interpretations and historical inaccuracies.

== Plot ==
In 1914, eight-year-old Dietrich Bonhoeffer is playing a game of hide-and-seek with his older brother Walter, at their home in Breslau, Germany. Walter announces his decision to enlist in the army to his family and leaves for service to fight in the Great War shortly after. Walter is killed in combat in 1918 and the family attends his funeral.

Years later, Bonhoeffer is a theology student in the U.S. During his stay, he met Frank, an African-American seminarian who invited him to the Abyssinian Baptist Church in Harlem. He heard Adam Clayton Powell Sr. preach social justice and became sensitive to the injustices suffered by minorities. Back in Germany, Bonhoeffer's family grows wary of the Nazi Party's growing power, including their influence in Germany's churches. Bonhoeffer is sternly opposed to the Nazi's changes in the churches, viewing them as sacrilegious.

Bonhoeffer starts an underground seminary in Finkenwalde for training Confessing Church pastors. In April 1943 he was arrested by the Gestapo and imprisoned at Tegel Prison. Later, he was transferred to Flossenbürg concentration camp.

Bonhoeffer was accused of being associated with the 20 July plot to assassinate Adolf Hitler. He was hanged in 1945 during the collapse of the Nazi regime.

== Cast ==
- Jonas Dassler as Dietrich Bonhoeffer
- August Diehl as Martin Niemöller
- David Jonsson as Frank Fisher
- Flula Borg as Hans von Dohnanyi
- Moritz Bleibtreu as Karl Bonhoeffer
- Nadine Heidenreich as Paula Bonhoeffer
- Patrick Mölleken as Walter Bonhoeffer
- William Robinson as Eberhard Bethge
- Clarke Peters as Reverend Powell Sr.
- James Flynn as Sigmund Rascher

== Production ==
In 2018, Komarnicki discussed shooting the film, then titled God's Spy, describing it as a "profound and pretty untold story of heroism from World War II."

In January 2023, Jonas Dassler was confirmed in the role of Dietrich Bonhoeffer and Flula Borg, David Jonsson, August Diehl, and Moritz Bleibtreu were confirmed as cast. Cinematographer John Mathieson and production designer John Beard were also revealed to be on board the project.

Principal photography took place in Ireland in locations such as counties Limerick, Clare and Tipperary, and St Fin Barre's Cathedral in Cork. Filming also took place in Belgium, in Brussels, Liege, and Spa. According to Variety filming wrapped before March 2023.

== Release ==
In November 2023, Angel Studios acquired worldwide rights to the film, which had been retitled from God's Spy to Bonhoeffer: Pastor, Spy, Assassin. It was released in the United States on November 22, 2024.

== Reception ==
=== Box office ===
Bonhoeffer grossed $12.2 million in the United States and Canada, and $469,429 in other territories, for a worldwide total of $12.6 million.

Bonhoeffer made $2.3 million from 1,900 theaters on its first day, and went on to debut to $5.5 million, finishing in fourth. Audiences polled by CinemaScore gave the film an average grade of "A" on an A+ to F scale.

=== Critical response ===
On the review aggregator website Rotten Tomatoes, 66% of 44 critics' reviews are positive, with an average rating of 6.5/10. The website's consensus reads: "Bonhoeffer more or less gets the job done as a righteous thriller, but its glossy treatment of history flattens this remarkable true story into a formulaic matinee." Metacritic, which uses a weighted average, assigned the film a score of 43 out of 100, based on 4 critics, indicating "mixed or average" reviews.

In a positive review, Joe Leydon of Variety wrote, "If it had been released just two years ago, Bonhoeffer might have come across as simply the latest in a long line of respectable but predictable period dramas about brave Germans who dared to stand up to the Nazi regime. Today, however, the movie feels more like an uncomfortably timely cautionary tale with unsettling echoes of current events."

=== Controversy ===
Bonhoeffer caused controversy before its release. In addition to numerous historical inaccuracies and misleading marketing, the film was accused of promoting viewpoints of the Christian right, including conspiracy theories. In the German weekly Die Zeit, experts on Bonhoeffer, including presidents of the International Bonhoeffer Society and the publishers of Bonhoeffer's work in German and English, accuse the movie of abusing Bonhoeffer's life in order to promote Christian nationalism. The film's slogan "How far will you go to stand up for what's right?" is not a question Bonhoeffer asked, they write. On the same page of Die Zeit Bonhoeffer's grandnephew Tobias Korenke calls ads for the film that depict Bonhoeffer holding a pistol an outrageous reversal of history.

Director, writer, and producer of the film, Todd Komarnicki, has asserted that the many accusations made against the film are false, and that the film is at its heart a distinctly anti-fascist film. The International Bonhoeffer Society released a statement in which several actors involved, including Jonas Dassler, August Diehl and David Jonsson, condemned the film's appropriation by Christian nationalists. The signatories criticised the misuse of Bonhoeffer's life and legacy by right-wing extremists.
