= Monster Maker =

- The Jim Henson Hour episode
- Episode no.: Season 1 Episode 6
- Directed by: Giles Foster
- Written by: Nicholas Fisk
- Based on: Monster Maker by Matthew Jacobs
- Original air date: July 9, 1989

"Monster Maker" is a 1989 45-minute television special, adapted by Matthew Jacobs from the 1979 novel of the same name by Nicholas Fisk.

Harry Dean Stanton plays an American Special Effects expert living in England, who is befriended by a young fan named Matt Banting (played by Kieran O'Brien). From Jim Henson's London-based Henson Associates, it was produced by Duncan Kenworthy and directed by Giles Foster.

The show aired as a standalone special in the UK. In the US, it aired as an episode of The Jim Henson Hour.

== Introduction ==
Jim Henson talks about the Creature Shop, showing one of the devils from The Storyteller as an example of what the Creature Shop can make. He then introduces Monster Maker.

== Plot ==
English teenager Matt Banting idolizes American special effects creator Chauncey Bellow, and designs his own practical effects in his bedroom as a way to escape from his unhappy home life. When Matt learns that his hero's studio is in his hometown, he visits and shows the staff his creations. Even the taciturn, surly Chauncey is impressed by Matt's work, and agrees to hire him as an assistant. Chauncey begins to mentor Matt in the art of monster making, showing him a giant, dragon-like puppet they're currently building called "The Ultragorgon." But Matt has lied about his age, and when his abusive father finds out he's skipping school to work at the studio, Matt's dreams are threatened and no one can help him — except, perhaps, the Ultragorgon.

== Conclusion ==
Jim Henson mentions that although the creatures look real, they are not actually alive. He tells how many performers were needed for the Ultragorgon (including Brian Henson operating the head from the Ultragorgon's neck compartment) as the viewers will notice when they see the credits for this special. He also brings out Kermit the Frog who comments that he liked the special.

== Credits ==
- Michael Gambon as Ultragorgon (voice)
- Jonathan Coy as Teacher
- Matthew Scurfield as Vaughn
- Bill Moody as Reg
- Grant Bardsley as Ben
- Alison Steadman as Perriwinkle
- Amanda Dickinson as Mother
- George Costigan as Father
- Harry Dean Stanton as Chancey Bellow
- Kieran O'Brien as Matt Banting

Ultragorgon operated by Martin Anthony, Tony Ashton, Michael Bayliss, Marcus Clarke, Sue Dacre, David Greenaway, Brian Henson, and Christopher Leith.

== Notes ==
- This episode was later re-aired as a stand-alone special without the framing introduction and closing, or The Jim Henson Hour title/logos.
- A puppet later used as The Predator on Dinosaurs was first used in this film in the movie Matt is watching at the beginning.
