= Jacques Palminger =

Jacques Palminger (born Heinrich Ebber in 1964 in Borken, North Rhine-Westphalia) is a German actor, musician, and member of the comedy ensemble Studio Braun.

== Discography ==
=== Albums ===
- 2007: Rasta Dub ’76 — Les Tools D’Amour (Nobistor)
- 2008: Mondo Cherry (with The Kings Of Dub Rock) (PIAS Germany)
- 2009: Songs For Joy (with Erobique) (Staatsakt)

=== Singles and EPs ===
- 1999: Sabàta (Gagarin Records)
- 1999: Universal Gonzáles (DJ Melanie)
- 2003: Deutsche Frau (Gagarin Records)
- 2007: Die "Henry" Maske (Nobistor)
- 2008: Polizeihubschrauber (mit The Kings Of Dub Rock) (Vulcano)
- 2009: Pudel Produkte 9 (Nobistor)
