= Fritz Honka =

German serial killer

- Born: Friedrich Paul Honka; 31 July 1935; Leipzig, Nazi Germany
- Died: 19 October 1998 (aged 63); Langenhorn, Hamburg, Germany
- Parent(s): Fritz Honka Sr. Else Honka
- Convictions: Murder; Manslaughter (3 counts)

Details
- Victims: 4
- Span of crimes: 1970–1975
- Country: West Germany
- Date apprehended: 15 July 1975

Friedrich "Fritz" Paul Honka (31 July 1935 – 19 October 1998), also known as Peter Jensen, was a German serial killer. Between 1970 and 1975 he killed at least four women from Hamburg's red light district, keeping three of the bodies in his flat.

== Youth ==
Honka was born on 31 July 1935 in Leipzig as the third of ten children. His father Fritz Honka (Senior) was a joiner and later a stoker, and his mother Else Honka worked as a cleaner. Three of his siblings died during birth.

During his later trial, Honka described his youth thus: "My father was in a concentration camp. I too was in a concentration camp for children. I was freed by the Russians. My father too. School afterwards didn't amount to much." His mother was said to be unable to cope with her children, and Honka grew up in children's homes in Leipzig. His father was said to have been sent to a concentration camp to do hard labor under the Communist occupation of Eastern Germany. He died in 1946 of alcoholism and long-term health issues caused by imprisonment.

In the early 1950s, Honka started an apprenticeship as a bricklayer but had to give it up due to an allergy. Honka fled to West Germany in 1951 and started work as an unskilled farm worker in the small village of Brockhöfe on the Lüneburg Heath. He had an affair with a woman named Margot which yielded a son, Heinrich. Honka had to pay 3000 Deutschmarks alimony and left the village. In 1956 he came to Hamburg and was employed as a harbour worker at Howaldtswerke-Deutsche Werft. A serious traffic accident in 1956 smashed his nose and gave him a pronounced squint. In 1957 he married Inge and had a son called Fritz, but the marriage failed and they separated in 1960. Neighbours recall violent scenes in their flat. The couple reconciled but separated a second time in 1967.

He moved to the Hamburg neighbourhood of Ottensen in 1967. In 1972 he lived together with Irmgard Albrecht for a while. On 15 August 1972, he attempted to force Ruth Dufner to have sex with him and Irmgard. Dufner fled unclothed from Honka's flat and reported him to the police. She received treatment in hospital. At the time of the incident, Honka had a very high blood alcohol level. On 4 April 1975, a court ordered him to pay a fine of 4500 DM, but a charge of rape was dropped. In the years afterwards, his problems with alcohol prevented him from maintaining relationships with women, and he turned to prostitutes he met in pubs or around the Reeperbahn for sex.

== Murders ==
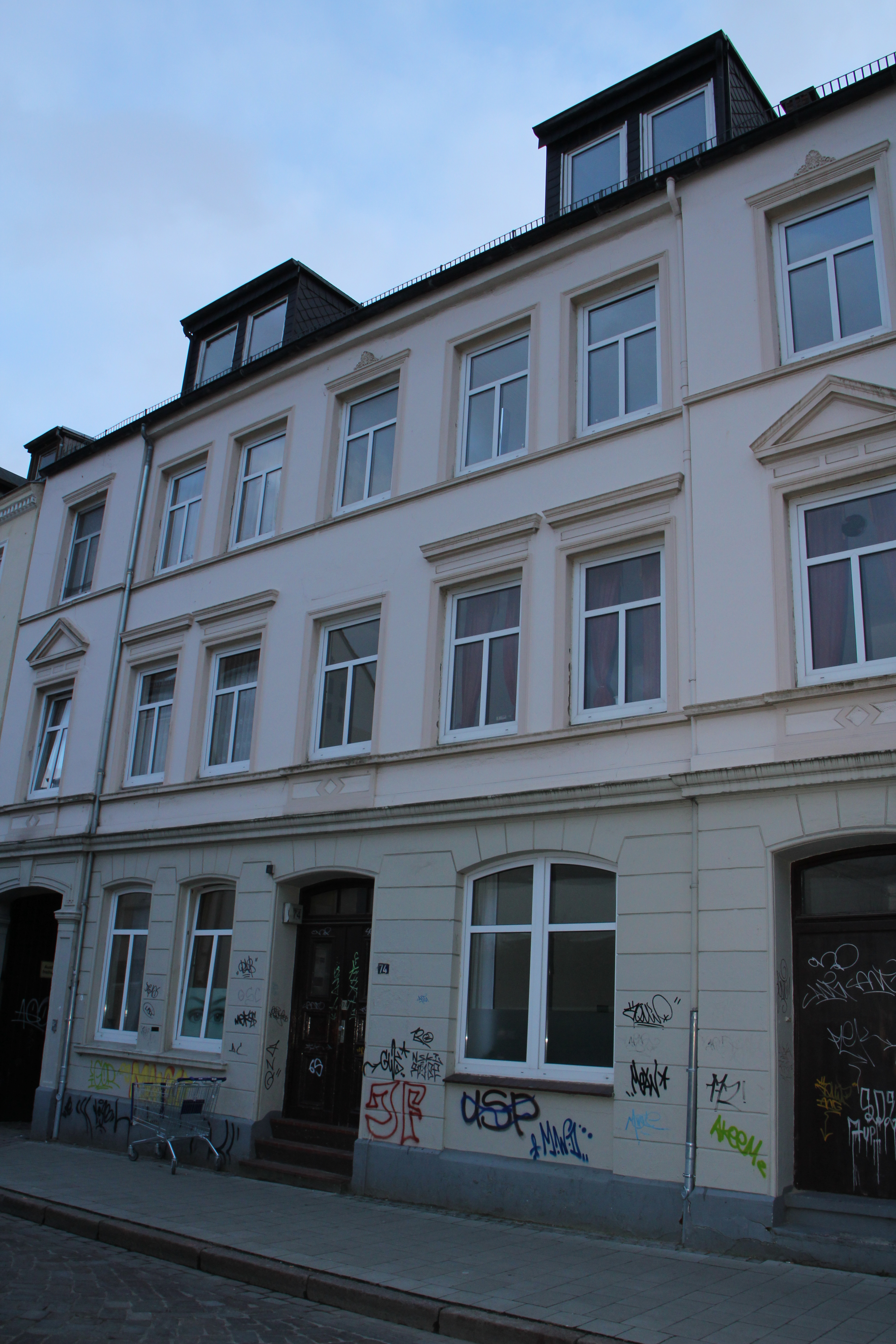
The apartment house in Ottensen, Hamburg where Honka lived

In December 1970 Honka, then a night watchman for Shell, committed his first proven murder. He strangled Gertraud Bräuer, a 42-year-old hairdresser and occasional sex worker, in his flat. Honka said that she would not have sex with him. Honka sawed the corpse into pieces that he then wrapped up and hid in various places in the nearby area. The body parts were found and identified by Hamburg police, but their investigation did not find the murderer.

Honka murdered again, four years later, when he strangled the 54-year-old sex worker Anna Beuschel in his flat in August 1974. He claimed that she had not been passionate enough when they had sex.

In December 1974 he killed 57-year-old Frieda Roblick in the same way and in January 1975 he murdered the 52-year-old sex worker Ruth Schult.

In all three cases, Honka cut the corpses into small pieces and hid them in his flat and in the house's attic. The disappearance of the three women was not reported to the police. Complaints of other people living in the house regarding the stench of rotting flesh were disregarded. Honka used large numbers of pine-scented perfume blocks in an attempt to mask the odour.

== Motives and personality ==
Fritz Honka was 1.68 m (5 ft 6 in) tall, and of slight build. He had a squint and a speech impediment. Both of his marriages failed due to heavy alcohol consumption. When very drunk he would vent his aggression on women, usually shorter than him and often toothless, to alleviate his fears of mutilation during oral sex.

== Discovery and trial ==
On 15 July 1975 the apartment building where Honka lived caught fire. Firemen tackling the blaze discovered a partially decomposed female torso in a plastic bag which prompted the police to search the flat. Honka was at work at the time and was arrested when he returned home. On 29 July Fritz Honka confessed to murdering the women. He withdrew his confession in November 1976, claiming not to remember anything.

In custody, Honka said he killed the women after they mocked his preference for oral sex over conventional intercourse. The court found him guilty of one count of murder and three counts of manslaughter. He was sentenced to 15 years of imprisonment in a psychiatric hospital. His habitual abuse of alcohol was considered a mitigating factor, as it diminished his mental capacity.

== Final years ==
Honka was released from prison in 1993 and spent his last years in a nursing home under the name of Peter Jensen. He died in a hospital in Langenhorn, Hamburg on 19 October 1998.

== Legacy ==
In 1975, German musician Karl-Heinz Blumenberg recorded the black humour single Gern hab ich die Frau’n gesägt (“I loved to saw the women”, a titular reference to the 1920s Schlager Gern hab ich die Frau’n geküßt, “I loved to kiss the women”, sung by Richard Tauber) under the pseudonym of Harry Horror, in reference to Honka. The song quickly became an underground hit in Hamburg clubs, but Blumenberg's record company RCA Records refused to officially release it due to its controversial theme. In 2017 the song was covered by the German rock band Kneipenterroristen.

German writer Heinz Strunk’s novel Der goldene Handschuh (“The Golden Glove”) was published in 2016, winning the Wilhelm Raabe Literature Prize and nominated for the Leipzig Book Fair Prize. It tells the story of Fritz Honka and bears the name of one of the St Pauli bars in which Honka met his victims.

German director Fatih Akin acquired the rights to Strunk's novel and made a movie adaptation which was released in 2019. Fritz Honka is played by Jonas Dassler.

== See also ==
- List of German serial killers
