= Jonas Dassler =

German stage and screen actor

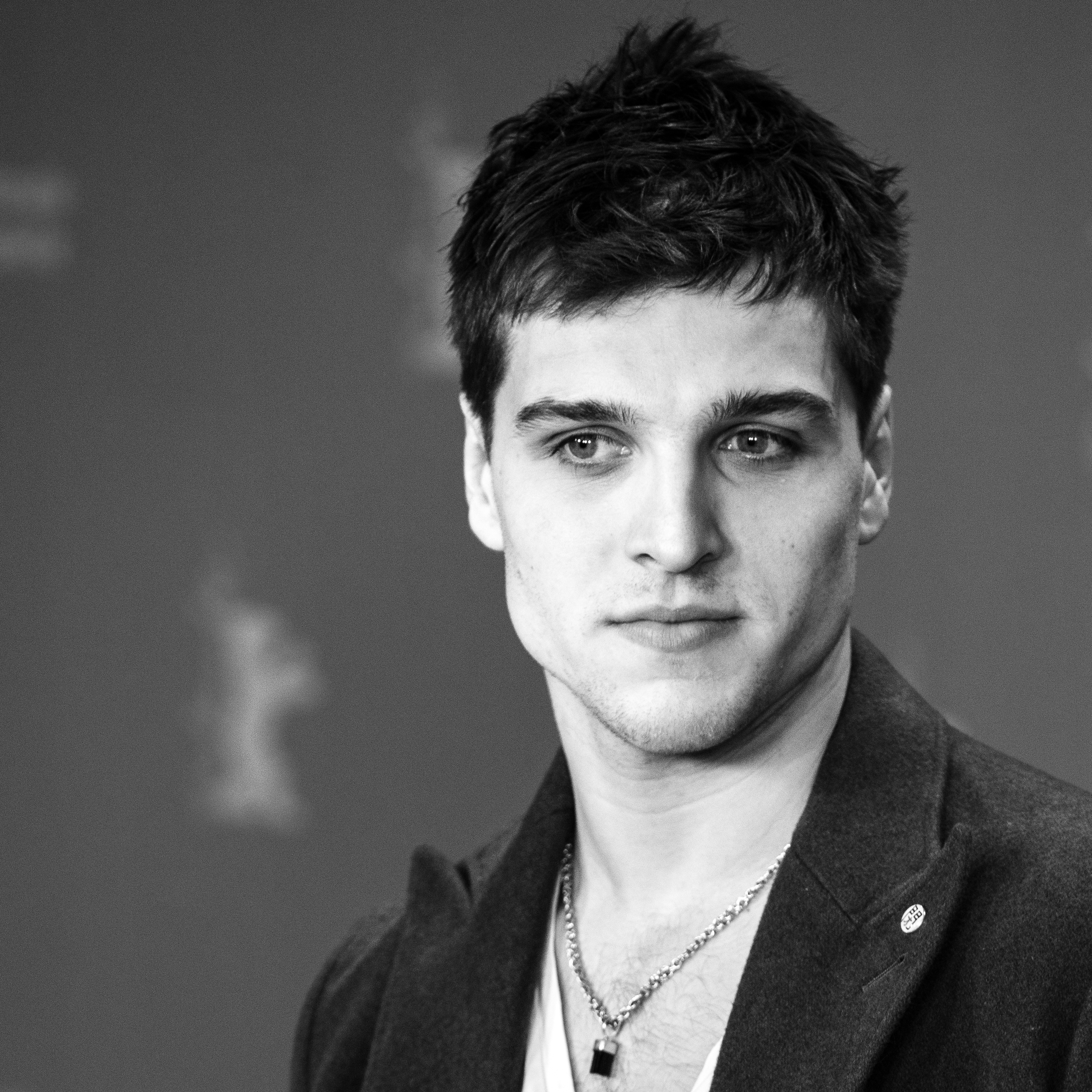
Jonas Dassler at the Berlin Film Festival, 2019

Jonas Dassler (born March 22, 1996) is a German stage and film actor.

== Life ==
Dassler was born on March 22, 1996, in Remscheid, Germany. Beginning in the eighth grade he participated in the theatre club at the Ernst-Moritz-Arndt high school. After graduating in 2014, he started studying acting at the Ernst Busch Academy of Dramatic Arts in Berlin.

During the 2016 season he performed the lead role in Georg Büchner's Danton's Death at the Schaubühne in Berlin. Since the 2017/18 season he has been a permanent cast member at the Maxim Gorki Theatre and appeared in several productions.

Reviewing his film performance in LOMO–The Language of Many Others, Variety wrote that Dassler "show[ed] strong heartthrob potential". In June 2018, it was announced that Dassler would star in Fatih Akin's Der goldene Handschuh (The Golden Glove) portraying the lead character, serial killer Fritz Honka. His work earned him a German Film Awards nomination for Best Actor.

== Theater engagements ==
- 2016: Dantons Tod by Georg Büchner, Direction: Peter Kleinert (Schaubühne Berlin, Berlin)
- 2017: Nach uns das All – Das innere Team kennt keine Pause by Sibylle Berg, Direction: Sebastian Nübling (Maxim Gorki Theatre, Berlin)
- 2017: Alles Schwindel by Mischa Spoliansky, Marcellus Schiffer, Direction: Christian Weise (Maxim Gorki Theatre, Berlin)
- 2018: A Walk on the Dark Side by Yael Ronen, Direction: Yael Ronen (Maxim-Gorki-Theater, Berlin)
- 2018: Die Gerechten by Albert Camus, Direction: Sebastian Baumgarten (Maxim Gorki Theatre, Berlin)

== Filmography ==
- 2015: Uns geht es gut
- 2017: LOMO – The Language of Many Others
- 2018: The Silent Revolution
- 2018: Never Look Away "Werk ohne Autor"
- 2018: Die Protokollantin (TV-miniseries)
- 2019: The Golden Glove
- 2021: My Son
- 2022: Skin Deep (Aus meiner Haut)
- 2024: A Sacrifice
- 2024: Bonhoeffer:Pastor. Spy. Assassin. (film)
