= Heinz Strunk =

German novelist and humorist (born 1962)

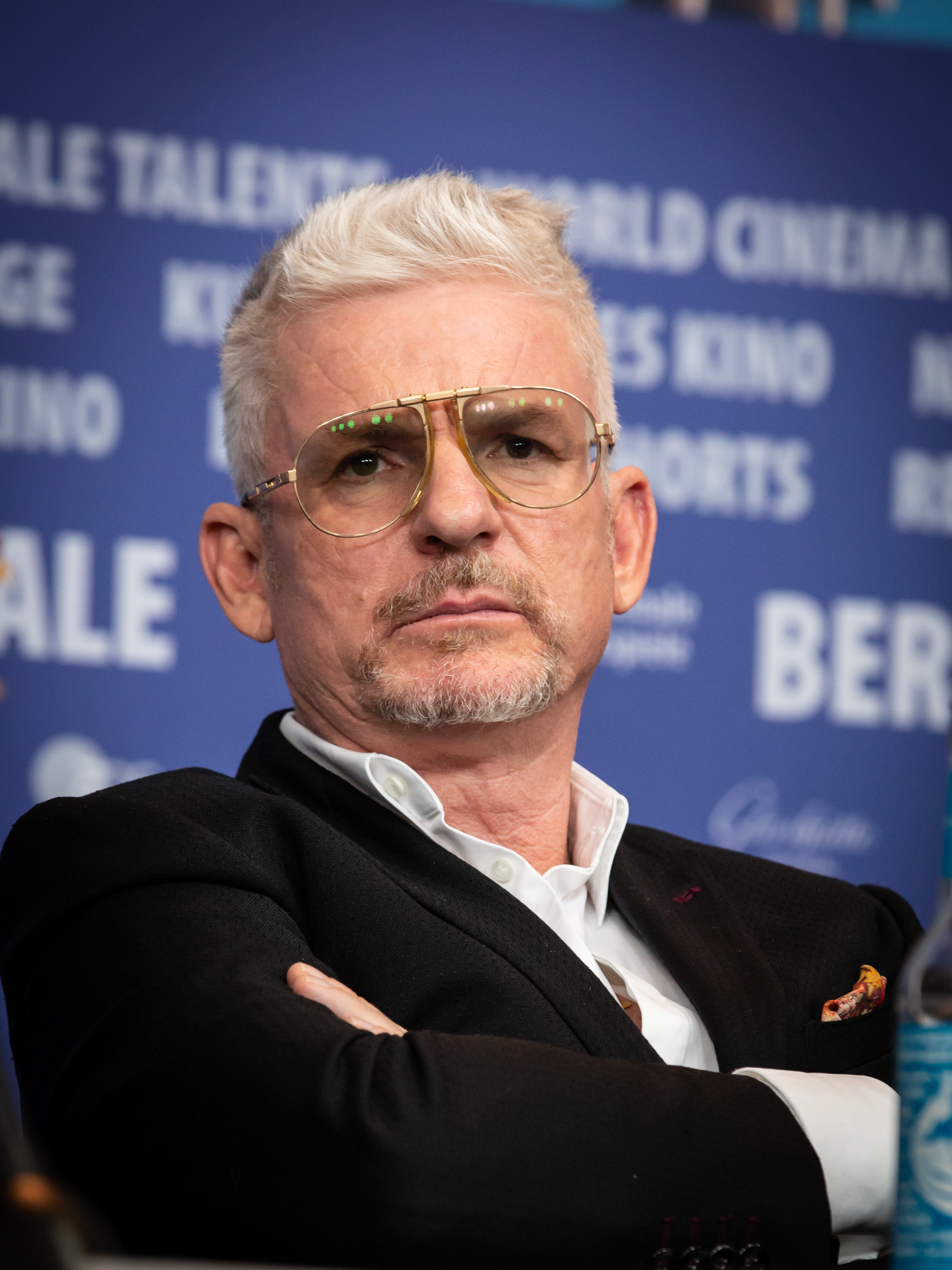
- Heinz Strunk at the Berlinale 2019
- Born: Mathias Halfpape; 17 May 1962 (age 64); Bevensen, West Germany
- Occupations: Writer, actor, musician
- Years active: 1992–present
- Website: heinzstrunk.de

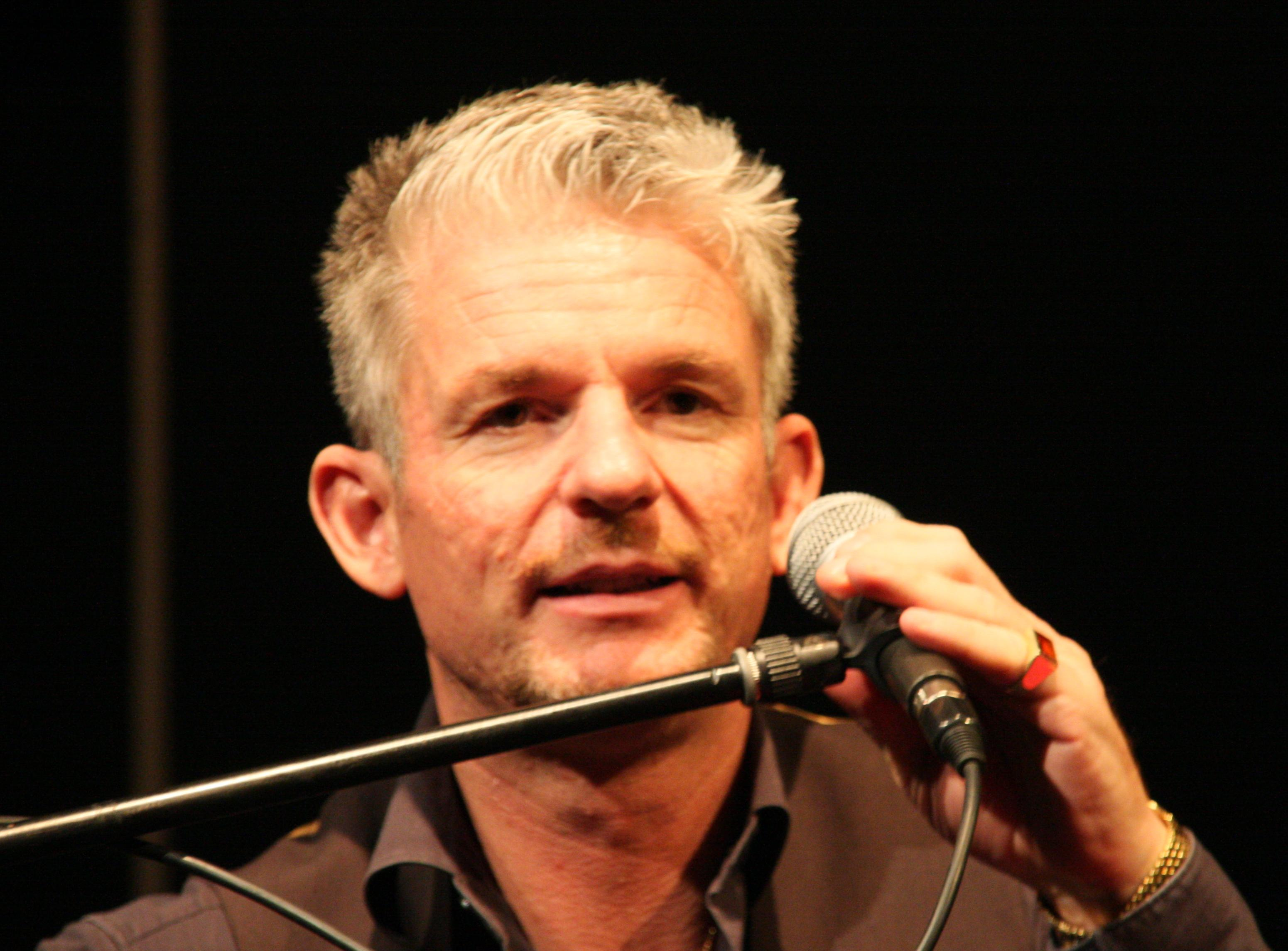
Heinz Strunk in November 2008

Heinz Strunk, legal name Mathias Halfpape (born 17 May 1962), is a German novelist, humorist, musician, actor, and member of Hamburg-based comedy trio Studio Braun. Strunk's comedy ranges from goofy prank calls to biting political and cultural satire, often involving music. Strunk plays woodwind and keyboard instruments.

== Career ==
Strunk was born in Bevensen and grew up in Hamburg. Performing in the pop duo Dis Noir under his real name Mathias Halfpape, he released the album Paradise is Far Away in 1989, produced by Dirk Steffens. He has released three audio albums with Studio Braun containing prank phone calls. An example of such calls include Strunk calling a coal merchant to order coke, where he means cocaine but the coal merchant understands coke fuel. In another call, Strunk phones a resident of rural Saxony, an area known for a strong regional accent, to offer him free elocution lessons to “correct” his Saxon accent. Strunk claims to represent a fictional charity for Hamburg residents to “help” Saxony.

In 2003 Studio Braun released the song Komputerfreak, which takes a serious look at the washed-up lives and addictive/compulsive personalities of those who spend large amounts of time using computers.

In 2004 Strunk’s comic novel Fleisch ist mein Gemüse (Meat is my vegetable) was published, based on his own youth as a musician in various small-time bands in the 1980s. A movie based on the book was released in 2008, directed by Christian Görlitz and filmed in and around Hamburg. In 2010 the novel was adapted into a stage play.

The writer and actor has an alter ego called Jürgen Dose. His works often deal with social outcasts and the bleakness of everyday life.

Strunk is a member of the German satirical political party Die PARTEI (“The PARTY”).

In 2016 Strunk’s highly praised novel Der goldene Handschuh (The Golden Glove) was published. The bestseller tells the story of the German serial killer Fritz Honka. Strunk won the Wilhelm Raabe Literature Prize and was nominated for the Leipzig Book Fair Prize. German director Fatih Akin acquired the film rights to make a movie based on Der goldene Handschuh. The eponymous film was released in 2019 and received mixed critical reviews.

In 2024 Strunk published Zauberberg 2 (“Magic Mountain 2”) to mark the 100th anniversary of Thomas Mann’s The Magic Mountain. The novel is a free adaptation of the original and set in the present day.

== Works ==
Books

- 2004: Fleisch ist mein Gemüse
- 2008: Die Zunge Europas
- 2009: Fleckenteufel
- 2011: Heinz Strunk in Afrika
- 2013: Junge rettet Freund aus Teich
- 2014: Das Strunk-Prinzip
- 2016: Der goldene Handschuh
- 2017: Jürgen
- 2018: Das Teemännchen
- 2019: Nach Notat zu Bett: Heinz Strunks Intimschatulle
- 2021: Es ist immer so schön mit dir
- 2022: Ein Sommer in Niendorf
- 2023: Der gelbe Elefant
- 2023: Die Käsis (storybook)
- 2024: Zauberberg 2

Filmography

- 1999: Derby – Fußball ist kein Wunschkonzert (short film)
- 2007: Immer nie am Meer
- 2007: Zeit (short film)
- 2008: Krauts, Doubts & Rock ’n’ Roll (Fleisch ist mein Gemüse)
- 2011: Trittschall im Kriechkeller – Die neue Schwester (short film)
- 2012: Fraktus
- 2013: Banklady
- 2014: Mord mit Aussicht (TV, 1 episode)
- 2015: Drei Eier im Glas
- 2017: Jürgen – Heute wird gelebt (TV film)
- 2019: Der goldene Handschuh (cameo)
- 2023: Last Exit Schinkenstraße
- 2023: Die Discounter (1 episode)

TV shows

- 2003–2004: Fleischmann TV (host)
- 2013–2021: extra 3 (commentator)
- 2016: Herr Strunk, Herr Schulz und das Jahr 2016 (host)

Solo albums

- 1993: Spaß mit Heinz
- 1994: Der Mettwurstpapst
- 1999: Der Schlagoberst kommt
- 2003: Einz
- 2005: Trittschall im Kriechkeller
- 2006: Mit Hass gekocht
- 2007: Der Schorfopa
- 2015: Sie nannten ihn Dreirad
- 2017: Die gläserne Milf
- 2019: Aufstand der dünnen Hipsterärmchen

Albums with Studio Braun

- 1999: Gespräche 1
- 2000: Gespräche 2
- 2001: Jeans Gags
- 2002: Fear of a Gag Planet
- 2004: Ein Kessel Braunes
- 2012: Braunes Gold

Albums with Fraktus

- 2012: Millenium Edition
- 2015: Welcome to the Internet

Stage plays

- 2005: Phoenix – Wem gehört das Licht
- 2010: Fleisch ist mein Gemüse: Eine Landjugend mit Musik
- 2017: Der goldene Handschuh
