= The Jim Henson Hour =

1989 television series

- Genre: Comedy; Anthology
- Created by: Jim Henson
- Starring: Jim Henson; Muppet performers: Jim Henson; Frank Oz; Jerry Nelson; Dave Goelz; Richard Hunt; Steve Whitmire; Fran Brill; Kevin Clash
- Country of origin: United States
- Original language: English
- No. of seasons: 1
- No. of episodes: 12 (1 unaired)

Production
- Executive producer: Jim Henson
- Producer: Martin G. Baker
- Production company: Jim Henson Productions

Original release
- Network: NBC
- Release: April 14, 1989 – August 7, 1993

The Jim Henson Hour is an American television series that aired on NBC in 1989. It was developed as a showcase for the Jim Henson Company's various puppet creations, including the Muppets.

Nine of the twelve episodes produced aired on NBC before the program was canceled due to low ratings. Two episodes later aired on Nickelodeon in November 1992 and August 1993, and the final episode "Food" never aired in the United States, but was broadcast in the UK in December 1990. After The Jim Henson Hour, the Muppets' next prime-time TV show would be Muppets Tonight (1996–98), six years after Jim Henson's death.

== Format ==
The Jim Henson Hour was modeled after the Walt Disney Presents specials, in which every week Disney would show off the latest innovations and creations of his production company. At the beginning of each episode, during the opening credits The Gryphon from Dreamchild, sitting in a temple on a hill and holding a crystal ball looking at an orange and pink gradient sky with thunder being heard. With a flash of lightning, the title appears on-screen (with the ball seen inside the "O" of "Hour"), as the sky clears and becomes blue with white clouds, some creatures (Droop, a lizard from "I Go to Rio", The Snail from The Tale of the Bunny Picnic, and a cave creature from Fraggle Rock) approach to observe the ball. Droop pops the ball, which causes a tornado to appear.

Inside this tornado are various characters from the show (and other Henson productions). This sequence includes:

- Bean Bunny in a cup
- Digit
- Gonzo, fishing
- Emmet and Ma Otter in their rowboat
- Miss Piggy
- Mad Dog in a vehicle
- The Swedish Chef tossing a pie at Fozzie Bear (who is in a TV set)
- Kermit the Frog on a bicycle
- Prince Leo riding a wolf
- a picture of the Storyteller

Jim Henson would enter an abstractly-decorated set (alongside the Thought Lion from his series The Storyteller) and introduce the evening's show. Beyond that, the series never had a set structure. The room where Henson and the Thought Lion performed their introduction was a computer-generated environment.

Three of the twelve installments were hour-long mini-movies:

- The faux film noir "Dog City", narrated by Muppet Rowlf the Dog
- "Monster Maker", in which an alienated teenager begins secretly working at a special-effects company
- "Living with Dinosaurs", in which a young boy's stuffed Dinosaur comes to life and helps him deal with a troubled family life.

Other shows like "Secrets of the Muppets" went behind the scenes at Henson studios, showing how the Muppets are built and operated.

Ordinarily, however, the hour was split into two thirty-minute segments. These shows would always start with a modernized variation of The Muppet Show, titled MuppeTelevision. That would often lead into more serious and sometimes darker content, such as a rerun of The Storyteller. Occasionally, a light-hearted story or more Muppet situations would close out the hour in the second half.

The first episode produced —Sesame Street… 20 Years & Still Counting— was aired as a stand-alone special. Henson's series officially premiered a week later.

=== MuppeTelevision ===
MuppeTelevision regularly occupied the first half of The Jim Henson Hour. It was an updated version of the classic series The Muppet Show, the new twist being that the Muppets were now running an entire cable television network rather than a single variety show. The Muppets broadcast their network's programming from a unique control room called "Muppet Central". Regulars included previous characters Kermit the Frog, Gonzo, and Link Hogthrob in addition to new characters Digit, Leon the Lizard, Lindbergh the Kiwi, Vicki, Clifford, Jacques Roach, and computer-generated Muppet Waldo C. Graphic, who was created through a collaboration between Jim Henson's Creature Shop and Pacific Data Images. Also appearing as a series regular was Bean Bunny, who had previously starred in the television special The Tale of the Bunny Picnic (1986). After The Jim Henson Hour ended, Waldo would go on to have a main role in the theme park film Muppet*Vision 3D (1991), and Clifford and Bean Bunny would continue to make appearances in various Muppet productions.

Muppet characters Fozzie Bear and Miss Piggy appeared intermittently on the series, due to scheduling conflicts with their performer Frank Oz's directing career. Miss Piggy received her own thirty-minute special for one episode; Miss Piggy's Hollywood, in which she and Gonzo attempt to interview unwilling celebrities.

The house band for MuppeTelevision was called Solid Foam, taking the place of the Electric Mayhem band that had appeared in most previous Muppet projects. The band members included, Digit on keyboard, Flash on saxophone and vocals, Clifford on bass guitar and vocals, Beard on guitar and vocals and an unnamed female drummer.

Electric Mayhem regulars Zoot and Animal eventually made appearances with Solid Foam in the episode "Food." Dr. Teeth also appeared in the background of a few of Solid Foam's music videos.

MuppeTelevision would occasionally get interrupted by an illegal TV station called Gorilla Television run by new characters Ubu, Chip, and Zondra. After The Jim Henson Hour ended, Chip would go on to make minor appearances in various Muppet productions.

As with The Muppet Show, every episode had a celebrity guest star. Celebrities such as Louie Anderson, Ted Danson, Smokey Robinson, Buster Poindexter, and k.d. lang appeared on the series.

== Episodes ==
No.	Title	Performers	Original release date	Prod. code	Viewers (millions)
1	"Outer Space/The Heartless Giant"	Jim Henson; With: Fran Brill; Kevin Clash; Dave Goelz; Rob Mills; Jerry Nelson; Dan Redican; Gordon Robertson; Steve Whitmire	April 14, 1989	106	12.6
Intro – Jim Henson states that this show is out of this world.; MuppeTelevision – Digit gets satellite feed from other planets, and winds up breaking down. It is up to Kermit, Lindbergh, and Waldo to go inside Digit's brain to fix the problem. Louie Anderson guest stars.; Musical Dance – "Neutron Dance" by The Extremes; My Dinner with Codzilla – Louie Anderson has a dinner date with Codzilla.; Miss Galaxy Pageant – An alien pageant hosted by Marty the Earthling (played by Chris Langham) as he interviews Zsa Zsa Porkmustard from Koozebane and Jo Beth Garfdoohoo from the Crab Nebula. Jo Beth Garfdoohoo ends up winning the competition by eating the judges.; War and Peace – Part one, war. Part two, peace.; Bootsie and Brad – Bootsie becomes an astronaut and Brad is worried because due to her many outfits and variations, Bootsie hardly has any time for him.; The Adventures of Space Guy – A sketch starring Louie Anderson as Space Guy as he and his crew of lobsters face off against Bean Bunny and his crew of Bunnies from the planet Cutetron.; Closing Number – The Muppets perform "Chattanooga Choo Choo" with the Teppums.; Before Henson introduces the Storyteller, he tells the viewers how he came up with idea of the series by mashing up ancient folk stories with elements from music videos.; The StoryTeller in "The Heartless Giant"; Closing – Henson talks about the guards that were seen in "The Heartless Giant".; Note: These are the first appearances of Waldo C. Graphic, Vicki, Leon the Lizard, Clifford, Lindbergh, Brad and Bootsie, and the Extremes.
2	"Oceans/Lighthouse Island"	Jim Henson; With: Fran Brill; Kevin Clash; Dave Goelz; Rob Mills; Jerry Nelson; Gordon Robertson; Steve Whitmire	April 21, 1989	109	9.6
MuppeTelevision – Kermit tries to run the show with several water-related issues interrupting. Ted Danson guest stars.; Musical Number – A fish sings "Splish Splash."; Guest Spot – Ted Danson stars in a sketch where he is on a cruise ship run by pirates.; Merlin M.D. – Rowlf the Dog plays Merlin as he helps a man who has a fish through his head.; Trailer – A trailer detailing "Karate Squid 3."; Musical Number – "Maneater" by The Extremes; The Underwater Life of Jacques Roach – Jacques Roach pilots a submarine with its crew consisting of rats and sheep.; Fable – Clifford tells an environmental fable where Ted Danson stars as a fish becoming a human.; Lighthouse Island – A boy named Zeb Norman (portrayed by Chris Makepeace) comes to a small strange town to look for a gift for his fiancée Rosalie (portrayed by Carolyn Dunn). He finds a pair of silver slippers in a local antique/curio shop run by a witch named Clara Buford (portrayed by Helen Burns) who drags Zeb into going with her to Hog Island to obtain a mysterious pearl that was stolen from her rival Fred (portrayed by Jerry Nelson). Also starring Margaret Moore as a fortune teller, John Dunsworth as Sam, Marty Reno as Jake, Bruce Armstrong as Carl, and Gord Robertson as the performer of a polar bear; Closing – Henson shows off a whale puppet and shows the viewer how small it is depending how you see it.; Notes: This is the first appearance of Jacques Roach. The MuppeTelevision half had no closing number in this episode.
3	"Power/The Soldier and Death"	Jim Henson; With: Fran Brill; Kevin Clash; Dave Goelz; Rob Mills; Frank Oz; Dan Redican; Gordon Robertson; Steve Whitmire	April 28, 1989	108	9.5
Intro: Jim Henson finds the StoryTeller's Dog in the Thought Lion's place as the dog tells Jim that Kermit got him a job in front of the Public Library.; MuppeTelevision – Gonzo and Leon convince Kermit to take a vacation so that they can have a chance at running the show. Willard Scott, Jane Pauley, and The Nylons guest star.; Musical Number – "The Lion Sleeps Tonight" by The Nylons; Monster Telethon – A telethon that is run by the Muppet Monsters.; The Time Channel – The Timecaster tells the different time forecasts until he is interrupted by Beautiful Day Monster and some other Muppet Monsters from the telethon asking if he has given any money.; Mrs. Goldfarb – A soap opera sketch featuring Franklin telling Darlene that he has called Mrs. Goldfarb. It is crashed by the Muppet Monsters asking if they have given any money.; Fozzie Bear – Fozzie attempts to become a Weather Bear on The Today Show by replacing Willard Scott.; Bootsie and Brad – Bootsie runs for president with Brad as her vice-president.; The Hat Sharpener – A story about a king who did not know how to rule a kingdom and worked as a hat sharpener.; Closing Number – "Sweet Vacation" by Kermit the Frog and the cast.; The StoryTeller in "The Soldier and Death"; Closing – Henson notices that the Thought Lion has a library card and notes that everyone should have one.; Note: This is one of the first of the few episodes to feature Frank Oz. First appearance of the Solid Foam band.
4	"Dog City"	Jim Henson; With: Camille Bonora; Ricky Boyd; Fran Brill; Kevin Clash; Dave Goelz; Rob Mills; Jerry Nelson; Dan Redican; Gordon Robertson; Steve Whitmire	May 5, 1989	105	8.8
Intro – Inspired by C.M. Coolidge's painting of dogs playing poker, Jim Henson states that he has made a movie inspired by it called "Dog City" and shows a trailer for it which is narrated by Jerry Nelson.; MuppeTelevision – Kermit announces that it is "Muppet Night at the Movies" as they try to find the film to broadcast on the All Dog Network (ADN).; Trailers – Bean Bunny shows two different trailers for his movie. The first one is "Bean Bunny and the Cuteness Thief" where Bean Bunny is stalked by Evil McBad (portrayed by the Wolf). The second one is "Beanbo" (a parody of Rambo).; Dog City Behind the Scenes – ADN shows some behind the scenes features of "Dog City" narrated by Rover Cleveland and featuring Lyle the Dog as ADN's anchorman. One of the scenes shown is that there are cats that are hired as stunt men that wear dog costumes.; Dog City – Rowlf the Dog hosts a 1930s gangster-type story in which a dog named Ace Yu travels to Dog City to investigate his uncle's murder. While there, he meets a homeless dog named Collien, and gets in trouble with a gangster named Bugsy Them.; Closing – Henson is shown with his character Bugsy Them as Bugsy states that he did not like the ending of "Dog City."; Note: Henson won the Emmy Award for Outstanding Directing in a Variety Music Program for this episode.
5	"First Show/Miss Piggy's Hollywood"	Jim Henson; With: Camille Bonora; Fran Brill; Kevin Clash; Dave Goelz; Rob Mills; Dan Redican; Gordon Robertson; Steve Whitmire; Frank Oz	May 14, 1989	101	8.4
Intro – Jim Henson wishes the viewers a Happy Mother's Day and talks about the second half of the show detailing "Miss Piggy's Hollywood."; MuppeTelevision – Kermit struggles to keep the ratings up. Meanwhile, Digit experiences several malfunctions. Bobby McFerrin guest stars.; Graffiti Muppets – Bobby McFerrin performs with some Graffiti Muppets as Statler and Waldorf look on.; Documentary – A documentary about the tranquility of nature turns into a war film as caterpillars and butterflies try to destroy each other.; Hurting Something – A yuppie drama from another planet starring Anthony. It is a parody of Thirtysomething.; Gorilla Television – Chip, Zondra, and Ubu hack the MuppetTelevision broadcast to feature Marc Weiner and his puppet Rocco. Unlike Ubu, Chip, and Zondra, Marc is shown to appreciate Henson's show. Ubu and Chip end up angering Weiner's puppet Rocco when Weiner's hypnosis on him was interrupted.; Muppet News Flash – Bobby McFerrin reads the news while The Muppet Newsman provides interpretations for the unhip.; Response-O-Matic – Link Hogthrob is at the mercy of the Response-O-Matic.; Closing Number – Bean Bunny and the cast sing "La Bamba".; Miss Piggy's Hollywood – Miss Piggy hosts a tour of Hollywood, with 'help' from Gonzo. However, Piggy quickly learns that Hollywood is not quite what she thought it would be. Meanwhile, Fozzie auditions at The Comedy Store which is attended by Statler and Waldorf. Guest stars: Justine Bateman, Dudley Moore, Bob Hope and George Wendt.; Closing – Henson demonstrates how the Graffiti Muppets who performed with Bobby McFerrin earlier in the show works and Henson has a dog Muppet and does a demonstration in front of the Thought Lion.; Notes: This is the first episode of the series to be produced and taped.; This is the first appearance of Anthony, Fern, Zondra, Ubu, and Chip.; Airing on Mother's Day, this was the first episode to air in a new Sunday night timeslot. According to the May 17, 1989 issue of Star-News, this episode was the lowest rated TV program among the three major networks the week it aired.; The footage of Miss Piggy phoning Muppet Central from a phone booth was taped in the parking lot of VTR Productions. Steve Whitmire performed Piggy while Frank Oz did post-production dubbing.
6	"Monster Maker"	N/A	July 9, 1989	110	7.2
Intro – Jim Henson talks about the Creature Shop, showing one of the devils from The StoryTeller as an example of what the Creature Shop can make.; Monster Maker – Based on the novel by Nicholas Fisk, a teenage boy named Matt Banting (played by Kieran O'Brien) wants to work for a famous creature and effects man named Chancey Bellows (played by Harry Dean Stanton). Matt winds up getting more than he bargained for when one of the creatures, the dragon-like Ultragorgon (voiced by Michael Gambon), supposedly comes to life and takes Matt under its wing. Henson's son Brian makes a cameo performing the Slerks. Also starring George Costigan as Matt's father, Amanda Dickinson as Matt's mother, Alison Steadman as Perriwinkle, Grant Bardsley as Ben, Bill Moody as Reg, Matthew Scurfield as Vaughn, and Jonathan Coy as a teacher.; Closing – Henson mentions that although the creatures look real, they are not actually alive. Henson states that when the viewers see the credits, it will state that it took eight puppeteers (consisting of Martin Anthony, Tony Ashton, Michael Bayliss, Marcus Clarke, Sue Dacre, David Greenaway, Christopher Leith, and Henson's son Brian) to operate the Ultragorgon where he also mentioned that Brian operated the Ultragorgon's head from the Ultragorgon's neck compartment. Henson also brings out Kermit the Frog who comments that he liked the special.
7	"Fitness/The Song of the Cloud Forest"	Jim Henson; With: Fran Brill; Kevin Clash; Dave Goelz; Richard Hunt; Rib Mills; Jerry Nelson; Gordon Robertson; Steve Whitmire	July 16, 1989	107	6.7
Intro – Jim Henson reminds the Thought Lion that he was supposed to be wearing a pith helmet. Henson also remarks that whenever they go to a fancy restaurant, the Thought Lion refuses to wear a black tie.; MuppeTelevision – Kermit wants the show to be all about being healthy and fit, but does not have much luck with all the Muppets getting sick. Digit gets a cold, while Gonzo's nose "goes off", and Link thinks that he has Canadian Snout Fever. Smokey Robinson guest stars.; Exercise Video – An exercise video starring Bean Bunny.; Musical Number – "Just to See Her" by Smokey Robinson and Solid Foam; Merlin M.D. – Rowlf the Dog plays Merlin as he helps a man who has a sword through his head.; Muppet Labs – Dr. Bunsen Honeydew demonstrates the new Exercise Shoes with Beaker trying them out.; The Swedish Chef – The Swedish Chef attempts to make cake and is constantly interrupted by Jacques Roach.; Story – A story about a couple that lets some animals stay in their house.; Closing Number – "Jump (for My Love)" by Smokey Robinson featuring Gonzo, Sweetums, Timmy Monster, Doglion, Link Hogthrob, Bean Bunny, The Swedish Chef, Digit, Vicki, Leon, Clifford, Beard, Flash, Jacques Roach, and the Chickens. Statler and Waldorf watch the musical number on their television.; The Song of the Cloud Forest – In this story that takes place in the rainforest, a golden toad named Milton (performed by Dave Goelz) worries that he may be the last of his species alive and may never find a mate to love until he meets another golden toad named Ruth (performed by Camille Bonora) and has an encounter with the Uprights (their term for humans) named Jack and Louise (portrayed by Jerry Nelson and Fran Brill) who are looking for a golden toad. While Bonora also performed Blanche the Chameleon, Nelson performed Ralph Robin, and Carmen Cuestas voiced a quetzal, the rest of the puppeteers consist of Steve Whitmire as Wilf the red howler monkey, Kevin Clash as Nick the Anaconda and a caiman, Ricky Boyd as Aart the Armadillo. Additional puppeteer work was done by Laine Cooke, Paul Hartis, Rick Lyon, Brian Muehl, and David Rudman.; Closing – Henson states that golden toads are endangered and that their homes are disappearing which happens to matter to Henson and the Thought Lion.; Note: According to the July 18, 1989 issue of the Kentucky New Era, this episode was the lowest rated program among all four networks.
8	"Videotape/The True Bride"	Jim Henson; With: Fran Brill; Kevin Clash; Dave Goelz; Richard Hunt; Rob Mills; Jerry Nelson; Gordon Robertson; Steve Whitmire; Frank Oz	July 23, 1989	102	6.6
Intro – Jim Henson introduces a clip from "The True Bride" where the Thought Lion speaks in. When Henson asks the Thought Lion if he will ever speak again, the Thought Lion says that he doubts it.; MuppeTelevision – In order to be in two places at once, Gonzo decides to prerecord himself. Buster Poindexter guest stars.; Music Video – "The Music Keeps on Rolling Along" by Solid Foam; Guest Spot – Buster Poindexter is with the Solid Foam as Beard and Clifford state how they admire him.; Bootsie and Brad – Talking Teddy and Sergeant Killing Death Machine visit Bootsie and Brad's tea party.; Fozzie Bear – Meanwhile, Fozzie spends the night in a creepy motel room and sees how kids playing basketball at night are using their heads as basketballs.; Closing Number – "All Night Party" by Buster Poindexter; The StoryTeller in "The True Bride"; Closing – Acknowledging the fact that The Thought Lion actually talked in "The StoryTeller," Henson asks the Thought Lion why he does not talk anymore. The Thought Lion says that he does not have anything further to say.
9	"Garbage/Sapsorrow"	Jim Henson; With: Kevin Clash; Dave Goelz; Rob Mills; Jerry Nelson; Dan Redican; Gordon Robertson; Sandra Shamas; Steve Whitmire	July 30, 1989	104	7.4
Intro – Jim Henson sees the Thought Lion eating chips and tells him that he will spoil his appetite. Henson learns from Kermit that the control room is covered in garbage.; MuppeTelevision – Kermit tries to run the show with bags of talking garbage continuously bothering him. k.d. lang guest stars.; Bootsie and Brad; Musical Number – "(Waltz Me) Once Again Around That Dance Floor" by k.d. lang and the Muppets; Musical Number – "I Love Trash" by k.d. lang; How the Nightingale Got Its Voice – Kermit tells a story on how a nightingale got its voice.; Observing Humans – Billy the Bear and a Raccoon observe a human family in their backyard.; Closing Number – "On the Road Again" by the Garbage; The StoryTeller in "Sapsorrow".; Closing – Henson demonstrates the performance of a garbage puppet which was made from a real garbage bag.; Note: This was the last episode to air on NBC.
10	"Secrets of the Muppets"	Dave Goelz; Steve Whitmire; Jerry Nelson; Kevin Clash; Fran Brill; And: Jim Henson; With: Rob Mills; Gordon Robertson; Bob Stutt; Brian Henson (uncredited)	November 29, 1992	112	N/A
Accompanied by a Cairn Terrier named Jojo, Jim Henson gives us a behind the scenes look at the Muppets and other projects. Upon learning this from Kermit, the other Muppets at MuppeTelevision try to deal with the fact that Henson is revealing all of their "secrets". He starts off by telling Jojo that she was built by Ed Christie with her mechanical riggings created by Tom Newby. Henson also tells Jojo that she was modeled after a real dog named Bamboo (who is also used for full body shots of Jojo). Henson then talks about the room that he is in which is actually a blue screen set. He then gives Jojo a tour of The Muppet Workshop as he demonstrates the operation of a puppet sandwich. Henson and Jojo meet Jane Gootnik who is preparing to reconstruct Gonzo since the principal Muppets tend to get a lot of use. Then he gives Jojo a tour of the Creature Shop in London where they see characters from Labyrinth, The StoryTeller, and Monster Maker. Back on the set, he shows a behind the scene footage of The Song of the Cloud Forest, how the Doozers and Gorgs from Fraggle Rock are operated, and how the Muppets ride bicycles. The Muppets then start to get worried when it comes to the puppeteers as Henson starts out by showing Jojo that she is performed by Camille Bonora. Then he goes to Pacific Data Images and demonstrates to Jojo how Waldo C. Graphic is operated and turned into a computer graphic. When it comes to the puppeteers for the Muppets of MuppeTelevision, Kermit states that the one under him is Henson, the puppeteer for Beard is Jerry Nelson, the puppeteer for Gonzo is Dave Goelz, the puppeteer for Vicki is Fran Brill, the puppeteer for Bean Bunny is Steve Whitmire, and the puppeteer for Leon is Kevin Clash. In the final scene, Jojo asks about how the Thought Lion works and goes near it. The Thought Lion roars scaring Jojo as Henson calms her down. Note: This was originally aired as a stand-alone special on Nickelodeon in 1992.
11	"Living with Dinosaurs"	N/A	December 30, 1989 (UK); August 7, 1993 (US)	111	N/A
Intro: Henson introduces the viewers to the special Living with Dinosaurs.; Living with Dinosaurs: A young, socially awkward boy named Dom (portrayed by Gregory Chisholm) tries to deal with a new school, an unemployed stepfather, a pregnant mother, and asthma. The boy finds comfort in his favorite stuffed toy, a dinosaur named Dog (performed and voiced by Brian Henson and assisted by Sue Dacre and David Greenaway). Also starring Michael Maloney as Lee, Juliet Stevenson as Vicky, Patrick Malahide as Uncle Aaron, Darren Bastable as Victor, Gwyneth Strong as a teacher, Myron McKay as a friend, Byron Spiers as Case, and Pippa Ford-Jones as a girl.; Closing: Henson shows everyone the Dog the Dinosaur puppet.; Note: Originally aired in the UK as a stand-alone special, "Living with Dinosaurs" was later reformatted as an episode of The Jim Henson Hour. However, NBC canceled the series before the reformatted version could air. The stand-alone version debuted in the US on Nickelodeon in 1993.
12	"Food/The Three Ravens"	Jim Henson; With: Camille Bonora; Fran Brill; Kevin Clash; Dave Goelz; Jerry Nelson; Rob Mills; Dan Redican; Steve Whitmire	Unaired	103	N/A
Intro – Jim Henson warns the audience that tonight's episode might make you hungry.; MupppeTelevision – Kermit has trouble keeping the show running because the entire staff is waiting for their lunch to be delivered.; Music Video – "The Food Chain Song"; Where Do Eggplants Come From – A stock boy tells an old woman where eggplants come from.; Luncheon With Link – Link Hogthrob hosts a food review show.; Let's Eat – An advertisement for food songs.; Hurting Something – Anthony and Fern snack on the Screaming No-Nos.; Gorilla Television – Chip, Zondra, and Ubu have a television consumer named Vivian Eggloff (portrayed by Camille Bonora) in bondage in order to demonstrate how a person is a slave to media.; The Swedish Chef – The Swedish Chef once again ends up in a duel with Jacques Roach.; Closing Number – "You and Me" by Solid Foam and the cast; The StoryTeller in "The Three Ravens".; Closing – Henson talks about the Screaming No-Nos and mentioned that they were made from wind-up toys.; Note: this episode's MuppeTelevision segment is the only one to not feature a guest star. In this episode, the Solid Foam band has Electric Mayhem members Zoot and Animal in place of Solid Foam's usual members Flash and the unnamed Female Drummer.

== Cast ==
- Jim Henson – Himself
- John Hurt – Storyteller
- Erica Lancaster – Amanda
- Jennifer Lee – Bootsie
- Andrew Wilson – Brad

=== Muppet performers ===
- Jim Henson – Kermit the Frog, Dr. Teeth, Rowlf the Dog, Link Hogthrob, Waldorf, Muppet Newsman, Swedish Chef, Waldo C. Graphic (demonstration only), Whatnot (demonstration only), Timecaster, Timrek the Gorf, Doglion, Bugsy Them
- Camille Bonora – Fern, Jojo, Miss Belle, Blanche, Ruth, Twitch Bunny
- Rickey Boyd – Laughing Boy, Aart the Armadillo
- Fran Brill – Vicki, Zondra, Merlin's Assistant, Alfonso D'Bruzzo, Maxine, Colleen
- Kevin Clash – Clifford, Leon the Lizard, Codzilla, Doglion, Timmy Monster (voice), Zoot, Ace Yu, Blue Extreme, Green-Furred Frackle, Nick the Anaconda
- Dave Goelz – Gonzo, Digit, Cabbage, Doglion, Timmy Monster, Dr. Bunsen Honeydew, Frisky, Jade Green Frackle, Milton
- Brian Henson – Storyteller's Dog, Dog the Dinosaur
- Richard Hunt – Beaker, Statler, Lugsy Bunny
- Brian Knatchbull
- Trish Leeper
- Rob Mills – Sweetums, Gramps, Solid Foam Drummer, Ubu the Gorilla (2nd Time), Animal
- Jerry Nelson – Lobster, Narrator, Jo Beth Garfdoohoo, Sheep, Shark, Fish, Beard, Wolf, Bubba the Bartender, Luncheon Counter Monster, Cow, a guy with a sword through his head, Garbage, Raccoon, Slim, Orange Extreme, Ralph the Robin
- Frank Oz – Miss Piggy, Fozzie Bear
- Mike Quinn - Devil
- Dan Redican – Beautiful Day Monster, Rhonda, Anthony
- Gord Robertson – Lindbergh the Kiwi, Chip, Luncheon Counter Monster, Timmy Monster, Rat, Scruffy, Vinnie Molar
- Bob Stutt – Ubu the Gorilla (1st time)
- Karen Valleau
- Steve Whitmire – Waldo C. Graphic, Bean Bunny, Foo-Foo, Yellow Extreme, Jacques Roach, Flash, Garbage, Billy the Bear, Doozer, Mad Dog, Wilf the Howler Monkey
- Sharon Lee Williams – Purple Extreme (voice only)

=== Special guest stars ===
- Louie Anderson – Himself
- Ted Danson – Himself
- Willard Scott – Himself
- The Nylons – Themselves
- Jane Pauley – Herself
- Bobby McFerrin – Himself
- Dudley Moore – Himself
- Justine Bateman – Herself
- Karl Rumberg – Himself
- Kathleen Wirt – Herself
- Marc Weiner – Himself
- George Wendt – Himself
- Bob Hope – Himself
- Smokey Robinson – Himself
- Michael Kilgarriff - Thought Lion (voice)
- K.d. lang – Herself
- David Johansen – Himself

== Cancellation and "lost" episodes ==
The show frequently acknowledged its own low ratings, with segments offering satirical takes on what viewers would rather watch—violent movies, ridiculous stunts, etc. In the end, the show produced twelve episodes, three of which did not make it to air before cancellation.

In 1992, children's cable network Nickelodeon aired Secrets of the Muppets, one of the lost episodes. They followed with the previously unaired Living with Dinosaurs segment, as a standalone special in 1993. The Jim Henson and Muppets segments in that episode have never aired. The final hour, consisting of the MuppeTelevision installment "Food" and The Storyteller episode "The Three Ravens", has never aired, though "The Three Ravens" segment has aired in the UK as part of The Storyteller series.

In Canada, the MuppeTelevision segments have run as a separate series called The Jim Henson Show. All of the feature drama segments, except for "Miss Piggy's Hollywood", have been run as standalone specials in the US and other countries, and have been released on home video. The Storyteller segments have run with that series.

=== Unused episode ideas ===
In addition to the abandoned hour-long episodes of The Storyteller, Lead-Free TV and picture-book specials, Jim Henson had many ideas for potential episodes or features that were never produced. These ideas included: The Saga of Fraggle Rock (a Fraggle Rock origin story), Inside John (a variation on Henson's Limbo concept in which the various parts of a seventeen-year-old boy's brain try to wrest control of him throughout a typical day) and ASTRO G.N.E.W.T.S. (a special that would have blended puppets with animation, computer graphics, and video effects). Other stories were proposed by Henson involving enchanted bowling balls, extraterrestrial mailmen, outer-space adventures, and a detective story with Kermit and the other Muppets. Henson also considered adapting Madeleine L'Engle's A Wrinkle in Time and the works of A. A. Milne. Also proposed was "an hour-long musical special featuring The Electric Mayhem in Mexico".

== Ownership ==
After the sale of The Muppets and Bear in the Big Blue House to the Walt Disney Company in 2004, the rights to various portions of the show have been split between Disney and the Jim Henson Company. The Walt Disney Company owns all of the MuppeTelevision segments (including the 15-minute episode shown with Dog City), Miss Piggy's Hollywood, and The Secrets of the Muppets, while the Jim Henson Company retains ownership of the rest of the series.
