= The Golden Glove =

2019 film

- German theatrical release poster
- Der Goldene Handschuh
- Directed by: Fatih Akin
- Written by: Fatih Akin
- Based on: Der goldene Handschuh by Heinz Strunk
- Produced by: Nurhan Sekerci-Porst; Fatih Akin; Herman Weigel
- Starring: Jonas Dassler
- Cinematography: Rainer Klausmann
- Edited by: Andrew Bird; Franziska Schmidt-Kärner
- Music by: F.M. Einheit
- Production companies: Bombero International; Warner Bros. Film Productions Germany; Pathé
- Distributed by: Warner Bros. Pictures (Germany, Austria and Switzerland); Pathé Distribution (France)
- Release dates: 9 February 2019 (Berlin); 21 February 2019 (Germany)
- Running time: 110 minutes
- Countries: Germany; France
- Languages: German; Greek
- Box office: $603,434

The Golden Glove (German: Der Goldene Handschuh) is a 2019 biographical horror film co-produced, written and directed by Fatih Akin. A co-production between Germany and France, it was selected to compete for the Golden Bear at the 69th Berlin International Film Festival. The film is an adaptation of Heinz Strunk's eponymous novel and tells the story of the German serial killer Fritz Honka who murdered four women between 1970 and 1975 and hid their body parts in his apartment. The Golden Glove is named after the pub in the red-light district of Hamburg where the disfigured alcoholic Honka met his victims. The Golden Glove was the first film by Fatih Akin to receive an 18 rating in Germany.

== Plot ==
In 1970, alcoholic night watchman Fritz Honka murders Gertraud Bräuer, a prostitute, in his squalid apartment in Hamburg. He quarters the body, disposing of some parts by throwing them away in a suitcase, while the rest are kept in an improvised locker in his wall. The police find the suitcase but cannot identify the culprit.

In 1974, Fritz sees schoolgirl Petra Schulz at a bar with her classmate, Willi. Despite the briefness of their encounter, Fritz begins to recurrently fantasize about Petra. Fritz spends nearly all his free time at The Golden Glove pub, often soliciting prostitutes that reject him in disgust. One night Fritz brings home Gerda Voss, a vagrant, who is allowed to pass the night conditional on having sex with him. The next day however, Fritz allows her to stay in exchange for sex and housework, as well as a signed contract of being introduced to her attractive daughter, Rosi.

After having lunch with Fritz's recently divorced brother Siggi, Fritz and Gerda go to the pub to meet Rosi. Gerda finally confesses that Rosi and herself are completely estranged and that she will not be coming. Outraged, Fritz shatters his glass and begins bleeding. While he is washing himself in the bathroom, an evangelist offers Gerda rehabilitation, which she gladly accepts. With Gerda gone, Fritz approaches three alcoholic women: Inge, Herta, and Anna. As a fight erupts at the pub, they accept Fritz's invitation to his home, although Herta collapses on the street and is left lying there. Upon arrival, Fritz asks the women to perform oral sex on each other. While Anna is too inebriated to respond, Inge adamantly refuses and Fritz assaults her, but she manages to escape. Frustrated, Fritz kills Anna by repeatedly smashing her head against a table. Again, he quarters the body and stashes it in the locker.

The following morning, a still-intoxicated Fritz is hit by a van. He survives and visits the pub for the last time before abstaining from alcohol altogether. Now consistently sober, he obtains a night shift as a watchman at an office complex, where he meets Helga Denningsen, a cleaner whom he finds attractive. At Helga's birthday party, Fritz is disillusioned to learn that she is married to a man named Erich. When Erich leaves, a saddened Helga reveals to Fritz that her husband has been unemployed for months and now is a financial burden to both. After sharing a few drinks, Fritz relapses and attempts to rape Helga at their next encounter, but she flees.

Fritz returns to the pub and takes another prostitute, Frida, to his home. While having sex, he hits her for laughing at his erectile dysfunction. Once Fritz is asleep, Frida begins robbing the apartment. In retaliation, she rubs spicy mustard on Fritz's genitals. When he wakes up in pain, she kicks him in the groin and insults him. A violent fight ensues, with Frida being strangled, battered, and quartered by Fritz. In the following days, he lures Ruth, another prostitute, to his apartment and murders her.

One night, Willi convinces Petra to go to The Golden Glove in order to impress her. In the bathroom, Willi unintentionally provokes an older man, who urinates on him. Humiliated, he locks himself in a stall and refuses to come out when Petra comes to check on him, asking her to leave without him. Fritz notices Petra and follows her through the streets, only to discover that his apartment has caught fire. Firefighters find the corpses and Fritz is immediately arrested.

== Cast ==
- Jonas Dassler as Fritz Honka
- Margarethe Tiesel as Gerda Voss
- Katja Studt as Helga Denningsen
- Dirk Böhling as Soldaten-Nobert
- Hark Bohm as Dornkaat-Max
- Uwe Rohde as Herbert
- Lars Nagel as Nasen-Ernie
- Greta Sophie Schmidt as Petra Schulz
- Martina Eitner-Acheampong as Frida
- Jessica Kosmalla as Ruth
- Tilla Kratochwil as Inge
- Barbara Krabbe as Anna
- Philipp Baltus as Pimp
- Marc Hosemann as Siggi Honka
- Adam Bousdoukos as Lefteris
- Tristan Göbel as Willi

== Reception ==
=== Critical response ===
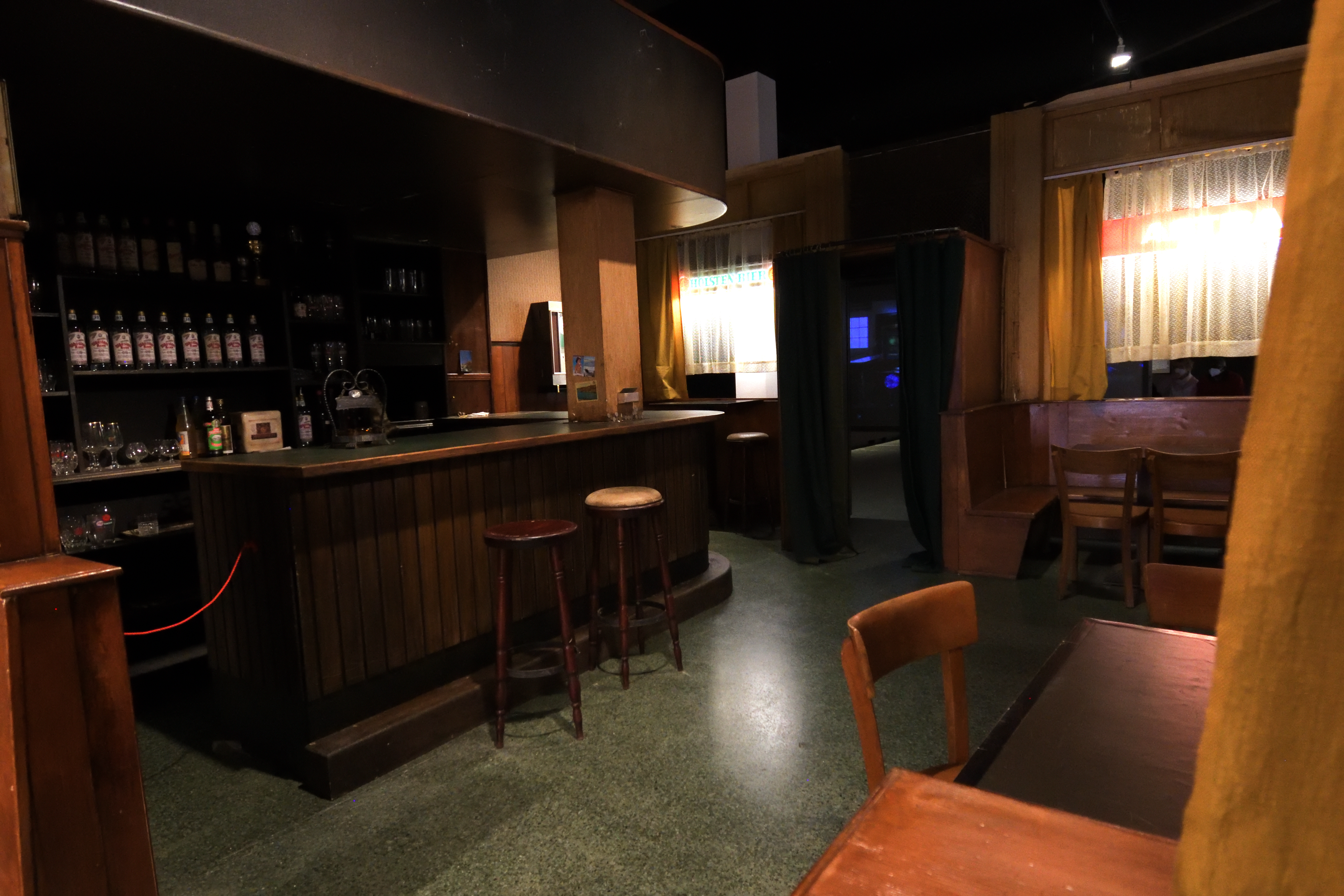
Filmset of tavern Zum Goldener Handschuh

At the 69th Berlin International Film Festival, The Golden Glove received mostly negative reviews from critics. Most German critics described it as a failed or inadequate attempt to adapt the novel and criticized Akin for making a nauseating horror film out of Strunk's artistic presentation of the events. On review aggregator Rotten Tomatoes, The Golden Glove holds an approval rating of 54% based on 35 reviews, with an average rating of 5.6/10. Its consensus reads, "Grim to a fault, The Golden Glove embarks on a well-crafted but deeply unsavory descent into the depraved mind and rank brutality of a serial killer." On Metacritic, the film has a weighted average score of 38 out of 100, based on 15 critics, indicating "generally unfavorable reviews".

The Guardian's Peter Bradshaw awarded the film two out of five stars, while commending Dassler's performance and technical accomplishments, he criticized the film for its realistic and brutal violence, and felt it was a pointless recreation of the events it depicts. David Ehrlich of Indiewire gave it a D and called it "disgusting" and "one of the most vile serial killer movies ever made." Pat Brown of Slant Magazine called the film "ugly" and "hollow", feeling that the film was "mostly an excuse to stage some unsettling murder scenes in the grimy underbelly of Hamburg." Carlos Aguilar of The Los Angeles Times echoed this sentiment, stating that Akin pushed the film's repulsiveness to its limits, depicting little psychological substance. Ben Sachs from The Chicago Reader called it "virtually unwatchable", panning the film's soundtrack, imagery, and brutal violence. The Austin Chronicle's Richard Whittaker rated the film two and a half out of a possible five stars, noting that the film's brutality, self-awareness, and director Akin's adherence the facts of the case made the film "desperately grueling". Even so, Whittaker praised Dassler's performance and the film's effective depiction of 1970s Hamburg.

Conversely, Spleeny Dotson of Starburst Magazine gave it six out of ten stars, commending the film for effectively capturing "the bleak hopelessness of the seamy side of the 1970s," as well as the makeup design and Dassler's performance. Dotson however, criticized the film's brutal violence as "repetitive and predictable" as well as its failure to explain the reason behind Honka's killings. Bloody Disgusting's Meagan Navarro rated it a score of four and a half out of five, calling it "a marvel of technical filmmaking", praising the film for its editing, production design, makeup effects and Akin's direction.
