= Nicholas Fisk (author) =

British writer

- Born: David Higginbottom; 14 October 1923; London, England
- Died: 10 May 2016 (aged 92)
- Occupation: Author
- Spouse: Dorothy Richold (m. 1949; died 2007)
- Children: 4
- Writing career
- Genre: Children's science fiction

David Higginbottom (14 October 1923 – 10 May 2016) was a British author who published under the pen name Nicholas Fisk. He was a writer of science fiction books, mainly for children. His works include Grinny, You Remember Me, Space Hostages, and Trillions. He also wrote the Starstormers series of novels.

Fisk died in May 2016 at the age of 92.

== Early life ==
Fisk was born in London. His father, William, author of Frightfulness in Modern Art (1928), was an artist and art teacher. His mother was the sister of the Irish actor Micheál Mac Liammóir. He was educated at Ardingly College, West Sussex.

== Books ==
=== Space Hostages ===
A group of children are kidnapped by a critically ill Flight Lieutenant aboard a top secret spacecraft. Left to command the ship alone, they struggle to return safely home. The book explores the dynamics of the global cold war and interpersonal relationships between the children. Published in 1967.

=== Trillions ===
A mysterious shower of tiny crystals fall all over Earth. No-one knows where they came from, or what their purpose is. Bonding together they form strange, and sometimes threatening, shapes. A boy with a microscope is just as likely as adult scientists to discover what is happening. Published 1971.

=== Grinny ===
Grinny deals with a normal family in middle England whose lives change when they are visited by aliens. The alien takes the form of an apparently benign elderly relative who can play mind tricks on the adults in the family but decides not to use this method on the children (although the sequel You Remember Me has the second alias used by these aliens, 'Lisa Treadgold' announcing that this decision was for the purposes of studying human children in what her race deemed to be a natural unaltered state. They do not bother with this process in their second attempt). This Granny-esque figure is eventually caught out by the children's ingenuity (they realise she is no normal human being when she expects what they describe to her as a "cast-iron conker" to be made of cast iron). Published 1973. Animated as an episode of CBS Storybreak, and briefly serialised on an episode of The Book Tower.

=== You Remember Me ===
In You Remember Me, the same breed of aliens from the previous book, Grinny, return to Earth and make another attempt to take over the planet, this time by inhabiting an attractive television presenter who can apply her mind tricks to many thousands as she presents her TV shows. Once again, she is thwarted by the children. Published 1984.

=== Wheelie In The Stars ===
Drone workers on a grim industrial settlement on a distant planet dream of assembling a smuggled motorbike, and taking to the open spaces. But petrol and combustion engines are banned and their attempts are sure to land them in trouble with the all-seeing authorities. Published 1976.

=== Time Trap ===
A teenager in the late 21st century discovers he can time-travel using a drug supplied by his "Uncle" Lipton, a man who has already lived over 130 years and likely to live at least 100 more. Together they escape the horrors of their mindless present to experience life in the past. But time travel has its own dangers, and Uncle Lipton isn't totally honest about his motivations. Published 1976.

This book was adapted into a film released in Denmark.

=== Monster Maker ===
This book was adapted into a 45-minute television special of the same name, directed by Giles Foster and starring Harry Dean Stanton.

=== Starstormers series ===
Published between 1980 and 1983 by Hodder, "Starstormers" consisted of five books; Starstormers, Sunburst, Catfang, Evil Eye and Volcano. Fed up of being left in a boarding school on Earth while their parents colonize a new planet, a group of children decide to build their own spaceship out of obsolete equipment in order to join their parents, but in order to get there they will first have to deal with the mysterious Octopus Emperor.

== Full bibliography ==
- The Fast Green Car (1965)
- There's Something on the Roof (1966)
- Making Music (1966)
- Space Hostages (1967)
- Lindbergh the Lone Flier (1968)
- Richthofen: The Red Baron (1968)
- Cars (1963)
- Trillions (1971)
- Grinny (1973)
- High Way Home (1973)
- Emma Borrows a Cup of Sugar (1974)
- Little Green Spaceman (1974)
- The Witches of Wimmering (1976)
- Wheelie in the Stars (1976)
- Time Trap (1976)
- Antigrav (1978)
- Escape from Splatterbang (AKA Flamers!) (1978)
- Monster Maker (1979)
- The Best of New Dimensions (1979)
- Starstormers (1980)
- Sunburst (1980)
- A Rag, a Bone and a Hank of Hair (1980)
- Leadfoot (1980)
- Catfang (1981)
- Robot Revolt (1981)
- Evil Eye (1982)
- Extraterrestrial Tales (1976)
- Volcano (1983)
- On the Flip Side (1983)
- You Remember Me (1984)
- Snatched (1984)
- Bonkers Clocks (1985)
- Dark Sun, Bright Sun (1986)
- Mindbenders (1987)
- Sweets from a Stranger: And Other Strange Tales (1982)
- Living Fire: And Other Science Fiction Stories (1987)
- Backlash (1988)
- The Talking Car (1988)
- Horror Stories (1988)
- The Worm Charmers (1989)
- The Back-Yard War (1990)
- The Model Village (1990)
- A Hole in the Head (1991)
- The Telly Is Watching You (1991)
- Broops! Down the Chimney (1991)
- Pig Ignorant (1992)
- The Puffin Book of Science Fiction (1993)
- The Great Pet Show (1994)
- Fantastico (1994)
- Not a Dickybird (1996)
- Space Stories (1996)
- Flip Side (1998)
- The Young Oxford Book of Aliens (1998)
- Bruce Coville's Strange Worlds (2000)
- Bruce Coville's UFOs (2000)
