= My Son (2021 German film) =

2021 German film

- Theatrical release poster
- Directed by: Lena Stahl
- Written by: Lena Stahl
- Produced by: Miriam Düssel; Susanne Freyer
- Starring: Anke Engelke; Jonas Dassler
- Cinematography: Friede Clausz
- Edited by: Barbara Gies
- Production companies: Akzente Film; Warner Bros. Film Productions Germany
- Distributed by: Warner Bros. Pictures
- Release dates: 8 July 2021 (FFM); 18 November 2021
- Running time: 94 minutes
- Country: Germany
- Language: German

My Son (German: Mein Sohn) is a 2021 German drama film written and directed by Lena Stahl.

== Cast ==
- Anke Engelke - Marlene
- Jonas Dassler - Jason
- Hannah Herzsprung - Sarah
- Karsten Mielke - Sebastian
