= Studio Braun =

German comedy ensemble

Studio Braun is a Hamburg, Germany comedy ensemble consisting of Rocko Schamoni, Heinz Strunk and Jacques Palminger.
