= Jean Bethke Elshtain =

American ethicist, political philosopher, and public intellectual (1941–2013)

- Born: Jean Paulette Bethke; January 6, 1941; Windsor, Colorado, U.S.
- Died: August 11, 2013 (aged 72); Nashville, Tennessee, U.S.
- Other name: Jean Paulette Bethke Elshtain
- Spouses: Norman Shaw (div. c. 1964); Errol Elshtain (m. 1965)

Academic background
- Education: Colorado State University; University of Wisconsin, Madison; University of Colorado; Brandeis University
- Thesis: Women and Politics (1973)
- Influences: Augustine of Hippo; Reinhold Niebuhr; Michael Walzer

Academic work
- Discipline: Philosophy; political science
- Sub-discipline: Ethics; political philosophy
- School or tradition: Christian realism; communitarianism
- Institutions: University of Massachusetts, Amherst; Vanderbilt University; University of Chicago
- Main interests: Just war theory
- Notable works: Democracy on Trial (1995)

Jean Paulette Bethke Elshtain (January 6, 1941 – August 11, 2013) was an American ethicist, political philosopher, and public intellectual. She was the Laura Spelman Rockefeller Professor of Social and Political Ethics in the University of Chicago Divinity School with a joint appointment in the department of political science.

== Biography ==
=== Early life ===
Jean Paulette Bethke was born on January 6, 1941, to Paul Bethke and Hellen Lind in Windsor, Colorado. She grew up in Timnath, Colorado. She was from a Lutheran background. She received a Bachelor of Arts degree from Colorado State University and master's degrees in history from the University of Wisconsin–Madison and the University of Colorado. She received her Doctor of Philosophy degree from Brandeis University in Massachusetts in 1973, writing her dissertation on Women and Politics: A Theoretical Analysis.

=== Career ===
Elshtain taught from 1973 to 1988 at the University of Massachusetts and then from 1988 to 1995 she taught at Vanderbilt University as the first woman to hold an endowed professorship. Elshtain was selected as a Phi Beta Kappa scholar, a Fellow of the American Academy of Arts and Sciences, a Fellow at the Institute for Advanced Study in Princeton, New Jersey, a Guggenheim Fellow, and recipient of nine honorary degrees. In 1995 she became a professor at University of Chicago. She was the Laura Spelman Rockefeller Professor of Social and Political Ethics at the University of Chicago Divinity School, and a contributing editor for The New Republic. She was also a Visiting Distinguished Professor of Religion and Politics at Baylor University.

In the 1990s, she chaired the Council on Civil Society, a joint project of the Institute for American Values and the University of Chicago Divinity School, which issued the report A Call to Civil Society: Why Democracy Needs Moral Truths.

She was a member of the American Academy of Arts and Sciences and she has served on the boards of the Institute for Advanced Study, Princeton, and the National Humanities Center. She was the recipient of a Guggenheim Fellowship, and received nine honorary degrees. In 2002, Elshtain received the Frank J. Goodnow award, the highest award for distinguished service to the profession given by the American Political Science Association.

The focus of Elshtain's work is an exploration of the relationship between politics and ethics. Much of her work concerned the parallel development of male and female gender roles as they pertain to public and private social participation. After the September 11, 2001, attacks she was one of the more visible academic supporters of US military intervention in Afghanistan and Iraq.

She published over five hundred essays and authored and/or edited over twenty books, including Democracy on Trial, Just War Against Terror: The Burden of American Power in a Violent World, Jane Addams and the Dream of American Democracy, Augustine and the Limits of Politics, and Sovereignty: God, State, Self.

In 2006, she was appointed by US President George W. Bush to the Council of the National Endowment for the Humanities, and also delivered the prestigious Gifford Lectures at the University of Edinburgh, joining such previous Gifford Lecturers as William James, Hannah Arendt, Karl Barth, and Reinhold Niebuhr. In 2008, Elshtain received a second presidential appointment to the President's Council on Bioethics.

Elshtain contributed to national debates on the family, the roles of men and women, the state of American democracy, and international relations for more than thirty-five years.

==== Analysis of major works ====
Elshtain's importance to the United States stems both from her impact in political ethics, and also her position in society as a woman. Carlin Romano, author of America the Philosophical, explains in his work that Elshtain's aim "was not so much to lobby for specific policies as to push for good civic-minded 'individualism' over the egoism of 'bad individualism'".

In one of her more popular titles, Women and War, Elshtain examines women's roles in war as contrasted against masculine roles and why these concepts are important to society. Beginning by examining America's societal interpretations of gender roles during wartime (man as a brave fighter and woman as a pacifist), Elshtain argues that men may make poor civic soldiers due to the fact that they are predisposed to a dangerous kind of eager adolescence on the battlefield, while women may be enthusiastically patriotic and possess a kind of necessary maturity, which is vital to successful combat.

In one of her more famous works, Democracy on Trial, Elshtain reflects on democracy in America, discussing how socio-cultural insistence on "difference" or "separatism" have evolved since the ratification of the Constitution, and how it may be detrimental to the system. Elshtain does not deny the importance of difference, especially within a civic body. Rather, she recognizes that Americans are no longer acting as representative bodies in governments, which embrace separate interests and also work as a collective towards the betterment of the whole. Elshtain, like James Madison, explains that American factional hostility is only a detriment to society: "one makes war with enemies: one does politics – democratic politics – with opponents".

=== Death ===
She died on August 11, 2013, at the age of 72 of heart failure resulting from endocarditis. She was buried at Grandview Cemetery, Fort Collins.

== Published works ==
=== Books ===
- Sovereignty: God, State, Self (2008)
- Just War Against Terror: The Burden of American Power in a Violent World (2003)
- Jane Addams and the Dream of American Democracy (2002)
- Who Are We? Critical Reflections and Hopeful Possibilities. Politics and Ethical Discourse (2000)
- New Wine in Old Bottles: International Politics and Ethical Discourse (1998)
- Real Politics: Political Theory and Everyday Life (1997)
- Augustine and the Limits of Politics (1996)
- Democracy on Trial, New York: Basic Books, 1995 [1993].
- Just War Theory, 1991.
- Power Trips and Other Journeys, 1990.
- Women and War, New York: University of Chicago Press, 1995 [1987].
- Meditations on Modern Political Thought, 1986.
- Public Man, Private Woman: Women in Social and Political Thought (1981)

=== Articles and interviews ===
- "The Self: Reborn, Undone, Transformed". Telos 44 (Summer 1980). New York: Telos Press
- "Voices on Antisemitism" (interview). The US Holocaust Memorial Museum. Archived from the original on May 19, 2007.
- "Is There Such a Thing as the Female Conscience?". The Virginia Quarterly Review. 2012.

Academic offices
Preceded by Dame Margaret Anstee	Gifford Lecturer; 2005–2006	Succeeded by Simon Conway Morris
Preceded by Noam Chomsky	Gifford Lecturer; 2005–2006	Succeeded by Simon Conway Morris
Preceded by Stephen Toulmin	Gifford Lecturer; 2005–2006	Succeeded by Simon Conway Morris
Professional and academic associations
Preceded by Kader Asmal	Grotius Lecturer; 2001	Succeeded by Moisés Naím
Awards
Preceded by 14th Dalai Lama	Democracy Service Medal; 2010; With: Floribert Chebeya and Laura Pollán	Succeeded by Madeleine Albright
Preceded by Francis Fukuyama	Democracy Service Medal; 2010; With: Floribert Chebeya and Laura Pollán	Succeeded by George Shultz
Preceded by Vin Weber	Democracy Service Medal; 2010; With: Floribert Chebeya and Laura Pollán	Succeeded by George Shultz
