= The Storyteller (TV series) =

British children's fantasy (1987)

- Title card for The StoryTeller
- Genre: Juvenile fantasy
- Created by: Jim Henson
- Developed by: Anthony Minghella
- Starring: John Hurt; Michael Gambon; Brian Henson
- Theme music composer: Rachel Portman
- Countries of origin: United Kingdom; United States
- Original language: English
- No. of series: 1 (Original); 1 (Greek Myths)
- No. of episodes: 9 (Original); 4 (Greek Myths)

Production
- Producer: Duncan Kenworthy
- Production location: Elstree Studios
- Running time: 22 minutes
- Production companies: Jim Henson Productions; TVS

Original release
- Network: NBC (US); Channel 4 (UK); HBO (US) (Greek Myths)
- Release: 31 January 1987

The Storyteller is a live-action/puppet television series that originally aired in 1987 and which was created and produced by Jim Henson.

Reruns of The Storyteller episodes were featured in some episodes of The Jim Henson Hour.

== History ==
The series retold various European folk tales, particularly ones considered obscure in Western culture, created with a combination of actors and puppets. The framing device had an old Storyteller (John Hurt) sitting by a fire telling each tale to both the viewers and to his talking dog (a realistic looking puppet of a brown and blonde Pudelpointer performed and voiced by Brian Henson) who acted as the voice of the viewers, and was written in a language and traditional style in keeping with old folk tales.

Jim Henson said on the first episode of The Jim Henson Hour that he came up with idea of The Storyteller because he wanted to mashup old folk stories with elements from music videos that were shown on MTV and VH1 at the time.

In the "Secret of the Muppets" episode of The Jim Henson Hour, Jim Henson stated that the Storyteller has a half-puppet appearance. Heavy make-up was used to create the character, notably large ears and a prosthetic nose, resembling the titular character from the children's book by Roald Dahl, The BFG. The Storyteller was initially conceived by Jim Henson as an animatronic puppet character. However, Ron Mueck filmed a test with facial prosthetics, to suggest that an actor in make-up would be more effective.

Henson, having worked with director Steve Barron on the music videos for David Bowie's songs "As the World Falls Down" and "Underground" (both from Henson's Labyrinth (1986)), was so impressed with Barron's work that he invited him to direct several episodes of the series.

== Broadcast ==
"Hans My Hedgehog", "Fearnot", "A Story Short", and "The Luck Child" aired (in that order) in the United States on NBC as standalone specials in January 1987, October 1987, January 1988, and April 1988, respectively. All nine episodes were then aired in the UK on Channel 4 between May and July 1988. "The Heartless Giant", "The Soldier and Death", "The True Bride", and "Sapsorrow" first aired (in that order) in the US as part of The Jim Henson Hour on NBC, the first two in April 1989, the latter two in July 1989. "The Three Ravens" was included in the Jim Henson Hour's twelfth episode, "Food", but the series was cancelled before it had a chance to air. "The Three Ravens" was not shown in the US until 1997, when the entire series was rerun by HBO.

== The episodes ==
=== The Soldier and Death ===
Taken from an early Russian folk tale retold in English by Arthur Ransome and is also inspired by "Godfather Death". A soldier returns home after 20 years of war, with three biscuits in his knapsack. On his way he meets three beggars to whom he gives the biscuits; in return one gives him a ruby whistle, one the jolliest dance, and the final man, who gets the last biscuit despite the soldier being hungry himself, in return gives him a pack of magic playing cards and a musty sack that has the power to trap anything ordered into it. Using the sack, the soldier manages to trap a flock of geese, and so manages to feed himself. Upon arriving at an abandoned castle overrun with small devils, he plays them in a game of cards, winning 40 barrels of gold, and when they try to kill him, he captures them in the sack only letting them go when they promise to never return. He makes one of them swear to serve him and keeps its foot as leverage. Quickly becoming rich and famous because he removed the devils from a palace that is owned by the Tzar, his luck runs short when his son becomes deathly ill. Calling upon the devil, the soldier is given a glass goblet that allows the owner to see Death. If Death is at the foot of the person's bed (as was the case with his son), he or she will recover if sprinkled with water from the goblet. If Death is at the head of the bed, nothing can be done. Then the Tzar becomes ill and the soldier, seeing Death at the head of his bed, makes a bargain with Death: his life in exchange for the Tzar's. Death takes his offer and gives the illness to the soldier, curing the Tzar. Lying in his death bed, he summons Death into his sack and stops death from happening everywhere. But as time goes on, he sees people everywhere who are waiting for death that will not come. So he frees Death, who fears the soldier and his sack so much that he refuses to take the soldier's life. The soldier, old and weary of life, seeks out a way to die. He travels down to the underworld, forcing the devils at the gates (the same ones from before) to give him two hundred souls and a map to heaven. Terrified of the sack, the devils agree to his demands. Upon reaching the gates of heaven, he asks to be let in with the souls while begging for forgiveness from God, but he is denied by the gatekeeper. He gives the sack to one of the souls, asking the soul to summon him into the sack when he has passed through the gates. But since there is no memory in heaven, the soul forgets and the soldier is condemned to live forever upon the Earth. In closing, the Storyteller remarks (with a smile) that the soldier is still probably about his business. As the Storyteller tosses the bag aside, a devil emerges from the bag unnoticed by the Storyteller but noticed by the dog who dismisses it as his imagination.

The episode stars Bob Peck as the Soldier, John Franklyn-Robbins as the Tzar and Alistair Fullarton performs Death. The Devils are performed by David Barclay, Michael Bayliss, Marcus Clarke, Richard Coombs, John Eccleston, Geoff Foxx, Brian Henson, Mike Quinn, and Francis Wright while Tony Jackson, Peter Hawkins, and Peter Marinker voice the Devils.

This episode was directed by Jim Henson.

=== Fearnot ===
From an early German folk tale. The Storyteller recounts the adventures of a boy who goes out into the world to learn what fear is, accompanied by a dishonest but loveable tinker. He faces many dangers without learning to be afraid, only to learn that fear is at home: the fear of losing his sweetheart.

This episode stars Reece Dinsdale as Fearnot, Gabrielle Anwar as his sweetheart, Willie Ross as the Tinker, Mr. McKay, Mark Williams as Fearnot's brother, and Michael Cuckson as the Pond Sprite.

The episode was directed by Steve Barron.

=== The Luck Child ===
Featuring elements from the German folk tales "The Griffin" and "The Devil with the Three Golden Hairs". The seventh son of a seventh son is born—a Luck Child. The wise men prophesy that someday he will be King. The oppressive King hears about the prophecy, and plots to kill the child. With his chancellor by his side, he sweeps the countryside for the Luck Child. Taking him away from the boy's biological parents, he pushes the chancellor and the child off a high cliff. While the chancellor becomes a meal for the Griffin, the boy survives since his swaddling safely unraveled him to the shore. He is found and raised by an elderly couple and is named Lucky. Years later, the King finds Lucky while inspecting a mill's harvest. Recognizing him as the Luck Child after hearing the elderly couple's tale, the King promptly hands the young man a proclamation to be delivered to his kingdom. Lost in the forest, Lucky stumbles into an underground den of thieves and meets a little man. The little man drugs the gullible Lucky, being skilled in the art of hiding his concoctions in goulash. Curious of his victim's message, The Little Man reads the King's proclamation: the King demands that the Queen have Lucky chopped into a thousand pieces. The Little Man pities Lucky and forges the King's handwriting to change the youth's fate--"Marriage. Do this without delay". While Lucky is still unconscious, the Little Man drags him within eyesight of his destination. The King is enraged upon his return as he sees Lucky marrying his treasured daughter with his written approval. Claiming that the new groom must prove his worth, the king declares that Lucky must bring him a golden feather from the dreaded Griffin (a nigh impossible task as far as the king is concerned). Lucky sets for the island where the beast dwells and has a ferryman take him to his destination. The ferryman shares that he doesn't know why he is forced to perform his task rowing back and forth across the blackened water without ending. So Lucky promises to find the answer. In the beast's lair, he meets the Little Man from the forest who was saved and brought there by the Griffin due to his delicious cooking. The Little Man tells Lucky to hide, drugs the Griffin with his tampered goulash, plucks the golden feather for the boy, and persuades the creature to reveal the solution to the ferryman's lament. As Lucky escapes while the Griffin sleeps, the youth takes a chest full of treasure on the shore of the island and returns triumphant. He explains to the ferryman to offer his pole to the next visitor in order to gain freedom. The King reluctantly gives his blessing to marry the Princess, yet is soon enchanted by the jewels Lucky has brought back. His greed leads him to the Griffin's island but he becomes impatient with the ferryman's speed. The ferryman offers his pole and the King is given the ferryman's previous fate as the ferryman is set free from his curse.

This episode stars Steven Mackintosh as the Luck Child, Philip Jackson as the King, Cathryn Bradshaw as the Princess, Pauline Moran as the Queen, Anthony O'Donnell as the Little Man, Robert Eddison as the Cursed Ferryman, and George Little as the voice of the Griffin (which is operated by Alistair Fullarton and Brian Henson).

The episode was directed by Jon Amiel.

=== A Story Short ===
From an early Celtic folk tale according to the creators of the series. Based on a folk tale with many variants worldwide. In an adaptation of the Stone Soup fable, the Storyteller tells of a harsh time when he was forced to walk the land as a beggar. Finding himself in sight of the castle kitchen, he picks up a stone and fools the castle cook into helping him make soup from a stone, by adding it into a cauldron of water and slowly adding other ingredients to improve the flavour. When the cook realizes he has been swindled, he asks that the Storyteller be boiled alive. As a compromise, the King promises to give the Storyteller a gold crown for each story he tells for each day of the year - and to boil him if he fails. The Storyteller does well at first, but on the final day, he awakens and can think of no story. In a panic he roams the castle grounds, running into a magical beggar who turns him into a flea. At the end of the day when the King calls for his story, the Storyteller confesses he has no story, and instead tells the King the true tale of his adventures under the magic of the beggar that day.

This is the only episode where the Storyteller himself plays a major part in the story he tells. The other actors include Brenda Blethyn as the Storytel's wife, Bryan Pringle as the cook, Richard Vernon as the King, and John Kavanagh as the Beggar.

This episode was directed by Charles Sturridge.

=== Hans My Hedgehog ===
From an early German folk tale of the same name and The Enchanted Pig. A farmer's wife drives her husband mad with her desperate measures to have a baby. She says to him that she wants a child so badly, she would not care how he looked even if he were covered in quills like a hedgehog. That, of course, is what she gets: a baby covered in quills, as soft as feathers. His mother calls him 'Hans My Hedgehog' and she is the only one to love him; his father grows to prejudice him for his appearance. The village children also taunt Hans, calling him "Grovelhog". So eventually Hans leaves for a place where he cannot hurt anyone and where no-one can hurt him. Deep inside the forest, for many years Hans the Grovelhog dwells with his animals for companions. One day a king gets lost in Hans' forest and hears a beautiful song being played on a bagpipe. He follows the music and finds Hans' castle. When Hans helps him to escape the forest, the King promises that he will give to Hans the first thing to greet him at his castle - which the King secretly expects will be his dog. Instead, it turns out to be his beautiful daughter, the princess of sweetness and cherry pie. Hans and the King have made a deal that in exactly one year and one day his prize (the princess) shall be his. A year and one day later Hans returns to the castle. The princess says she knows what she must do. Hans asks her if she finds him ugly and she replies that he is not nearly as ugly as a broken promise. They are married, to the dismay of the entire kingdom. On their wedding night, the princess awaits her husband in bed. He comes into the chamber with his bagpipes and takes a seat by the fire and begins to play the same beautiful music that saved the king a year prior. The Princess is soothed by the music and dozes off. She wakes and finds a pelt of quills as soft as feathers on the ground before the fire. She sees her husband in the form of a handsome young man freeing the animals of the castle, to live with his friends in his forest castle. He knows she has seen him when he finds her slumbering on the discarded quills the following night. He tells her that he is bewitched and only if she can keep his secret for one more night can he be freed and remain in the form of the handsome man. She agrees. The next morning at breakfast the Queen inquires why her daughter is so cheerful. The Princess tries to resist but as her mother pries she gives in and tells her that Hans is bewitched. The Queen says that the only way to reverse the spell is to fling the quills in the fire. That night when Hans sheds his quills, she obeys her mother and burns them. She hears his screams of pain as if he were aflame, and Hans runs from the castle. The Princess has a blacksmith make her three pairs of solid iron shoes and slips away in search of her husband. She wears the shoes to nothing and moves on to the second pair, with still no sign of Hans. When she is donning the third pair of shoes, she finds a river and reclines by it, taking off the shoes and rubbing her sore feet. Catching sight of her reflection, she sees that her red hair has grown white. She weeps bitterly for her hair and her husband, forever lost. The next day she comes to a cottage, abandoned, covered in dust and cobwebs. Then comes the flapping of wings and she sees her husband whom she had so long searched for. He toasts a glass of wine to no-one, "to the beautiful woman who could not keep her promise." She asks him how long he has toasted to a woman as ugly as her broken promise and he becomes rigid and asks how she found him. She tells him all of the perils that she has faced and how she has walked the world and worn through three pairs of iron shoes. Then she flings herself into his embrace and with her confession of love and loyalty, he transforms into the handsome man, the spell lifted by her fidelity and affection. Her hair returns red as they have a second wedding. The Storyteller states that he was given the final pair of the Princess' third pair of shoes which were worn down to nothing.

This episode stars Jason Carter as Hans' human form, Terence Harvey as the voice of Hans the Hedgehog, Abigail Cruttenden as the Princess, David Swift as the King, Helen Lindsay as the Queen, Eric Richard as the Farmer, and Maggie Wilkinson as the Farmer's Wife.

The episode was directed by Steve Barron.

=== The Three Ravens ===
Based on the early German folk tale, The Six Swans. After the queen dies, an evil witch ensnares the King and turns his three sons into ravens to rid herself of her rivals. The Princess escapes and must stay silent for three years, three months, three weeks and three days in order to break the spell. But after she meets a handsome Prince, this is suddenly not so easy for her stepmother has remarried and to the prince's father...

This episode stars Joely Richardson as the Princess, Miranda Richardson as the Witch, Robert Hines as the Prince, Jonathan Pryce as the King, and Richard Butler as the Second King.

The episode was directed by Paul Weiland.

=== Sapsorrow ===
From an early German folk tale, this is a variant on "Allerleirauh", as well as containing elements of Donkeyskin and the Cinderella story recorded by the brothers Grimm. There is a widowed king, who has three daughters. Two are as ugly and as bad as can be, but the third nicknamed Sapsorrow is as kind and as beautiful as her sisters are not. There is a ring belonging to the dead queen and a royal tradition that states that the girl whose finger fits the ring will become queen as decreed by law. Neither of the bad sisters wish their father to marry for fear that his bride will stand to inherit his title and riches. In an effort to secure the royal wealth for their own they each try on the ring, though the ring becomes stuck on one of the sisters' fingers and Sapsorrow is forced to remove the ring. When Princess Sapsorrow slips on her dead mother's ring for safekeeping, she discovers, much to her own dismay, that the ring fits perfectly and the king (against his own wishes) must marry her, his own daughter, according to the law. The princess attempts to stall the wedding by demanding three magnificent gowns: a gown as pale as the moon, a gown as sparkling as the stars, and a gown as golden as the sun. Once her father provides these, on the night of the wedding she takes the gowns and goes into hiding, disguising herself as a creature of fur and feathers known as Straggletag. She lives thus for years, working in the kitchen of a handsome but proud prince. On the night of the ball, she discards her disguise and attends three different balls in one of her bridal gowns and captures the heart of the prince, leaving him naught but a single slipper as she runs off into the night. The prince scours the kingdom for the girl whose foot fits the slipper and agrees to marry Straggletag when hers is the foot it fits. At this proclamation, her pets strip away her disguise for good and the two become happily wed as they dance until they get exhausted. The Storyteller states that he has to go wake them up before the wedding starts.

This episode stars Alison Doody as Sapsorrow, Dawn French and Jennifer Saunders as her bad sisters, Geoffrey Bayldon as the King, and James Wilby as the Prince. The badgers, birds, and squirrels are performed by David Greenaway, Robert Tygner, and Mak Wilson.

The episode was directed by Steve Barron.

=== The Heartless Giant ===
From an early German folk tale according to the creators of the series. A heartless giant, who once terrorized the land before being captured and imprisoned, is befriended by the young Prince Leo who, one night, sets him free. His older brothers go after the giant to capture him, but do not return, so Leo sets off to find the giant himself. Once found, Leo decides to find the giant's heart, but this is no easy task - it sits in an egg in a duck in a well in a church in a lake in a mountain far away. No easy task indeed. Even when Prince Leo finds the heart and brings it to the giant, one of the brothers grabs the heart and squeezes it enough to kill the giant, whose dead body becomes a hill. The Storyteller tells his dog that when Prince Leo became king, he retold the story where he states that he gave the heart back to the giant and that the giant never bothered the kingdom again.

This is a variation upon the Norwegian tale The Giant Who Had No Heart in His Body, though there are some parallels with the Slavic legend of Koschei the Deathless.

This episode stars Elliott Spiers as Prince Leo, Nicholas Selby as the King, Peter Marinker as the voice of the wolf, and Frederick Warder as the giant. The birds, salmon and wolf are performed by David Greenaway, Robert Tygner, and Mak Wilson.

The episode was directed by Jim Henson.

=== The True Bride ===
Based on an early German folk tale The True Bride, combined with the Norwegian fairy tale, East of the Sun and West of the Moon. A troll had a daughter, but since trolls are so mean, they can't even stand each other, she left straight off. So the troll took another girl to replace her to wait on him hand and foot. Her name is Anja and she has no father or mother, making the troll her only "family". Setting her impossible tasks, then beating her with his "contradiction stick" when she invariably fails, the troll makes sure to make her life miserable, until she one day makes a wish. Her wish is heard by a white lion called the Thought Lion who completes her impossible tasks for her. When the troll asks her to build him a palace, the Lion builds it for her, and the troll falls to his death in a bottomless room. Anja lives happily in the castle. She finds her true love in the handsome palace gardener, whom she makes into a prince from his humble beginnings. He disappears one day, so Anja sets out to find him. When she finally does, he turns out to be bewitched at the hands of the troll's evil daughter, the Trollop, so that he has forgotten his past.

Anja trades three magical nuts to the greedy Trollop—one which gives unlimited fine silk, one which gives unlimited gold, and one which give unlimited jewels—for three nights with her beloved. However, on the first two nights, she is unable to wake him, for the Trollop had drugged him. On the third day, before night fall, the man hears the Trollop's prisoners calling out, asking how he can sleep each night with such a beautiful woman calling to him and weeping for him. The gardener, who can't remember Anja because of the Trollop's spell, becomes suspicious. On the third night, he avoids the drink the Trollop bring him, and pretends to fall asleep. When Anja comes to him for the last time and tries to wake him, he gets up and tells her that he cannot remember who she is. She kisses him, and the Trollop's spell is broken, and he remembers their love. At that moment, the three magical gifts fail, and the gold, silk, and jewels disappear.

In a rage, the Trollop pursues Anja and her sweetheart, who ride back to their castle on the back of the Thought Lion. When the Trollop catches up to the pair at the castle, she is misled by what she thinks is the scent of the couple and sounds of their voices, and falls to her death the same bottomless room that killed her father the troll. Anja and her beau are married and have a statue made to commemorate the Thought Lion.

This episode stars Jane Horrocks as Anja, Sean Bean as the Prince, Michael Kilgarriff as the voice of the Thought Lion, Alun Armstrong as the voice of the Troll, and Sandra Voe as the voice of the Trollop. The Thought Lion is operated by David Greenaway, Robert Tygner, and Mak Wilson while the Troll and Trollop are performed by Frederick Warder.

The episode was directed by Peter Smith.

== The Storyteller: Greek Myths ==
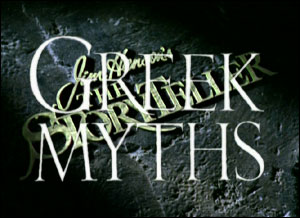
Title card for The Storytel: Greek Myths

The Storyteller: Greek Myths is a four episode follow-up, with a different Storyteller (Michael Gambon) paired with the same dog (again performed and voiced by Brian Henson). This second series was produced by Jim Henson in 1990, beginning shortly before he died and continuing after his death. A US broadcaster could not be found, NBC having deemed the original episodes too strong for children, and refused to run them as a separate series. It remained unaired in the US until the entire 13 episode series was rerun in 1997 by HBO. The four episodes first aired in the Netherlands in April 1991, and the UK in December 1991. Written by Nigel Williams, the spin-off series follows a new Storyteller recounting tales from Greek mythology, while his dog interjects with commentary and questions. The two explore underground ruins, uncovering artifacts that prompt the stories along the way.

=== Theseus and the Minotaur ===
An Athenian Storyteller and his dog take shelter in the labyrinth of Knossos.

There, he recounts the story of the Minotaur confined to the maze by King Minos ten centuries earlier. King Aegeus had left his sword under a huge rock and told Aethra that when their son Theseus would grow up, he should move the rock to learn who his father was. Theseus grew up and became a brave young man. He managed to move the rock and took up his father's sword. His mother then told him the truth about his father's identity. Theseus decided to go to Athens, either by sea, which was the safe way or by land, following a dangerous path with bandits and monsters all the way. Young and ambitious, Theseus decided to go to Athens by land; slaying Procrustes, Sciron the Kicker, and Sinis the Pine Bender along the way. He arrived in Athens where King Aegeus welcomed while Medea plotted to kill Theseus so her own son can be king. After King Aegeus recognized the sword that Theseus is carrying, he knocked the poisoned drink out of his hand in time. Before the guards can arrest Medea, she teleports away while cursing Aegeus. Reclaiming his rightful place as the son of King Aegeus, Theseus insisted on travelling to Crete to kill the dreaded Minotaur. He promised to his father Aegeus that he would put up a white sail on his journey back home if he was successful. Ariadne, Minos' daughter, fell in love with Theseus and helped him get out of the Labyrinth by giving him a ball of thread allowing him to retrace his path. Theseus killed the Minotaur; even though he was Ariadne's brother. Theseus took Ariadne with him but on the return trip abandoned her on the island of Naxos. He also failed to fly white sails on his return journey due to using it to wrap the Minotaur's head, thus causing his father to throw himself into the Aegean Sea which was since named after him. Theseus becomes king. Many nights, he dreams he slew his own parents or Ariadne, and had the Minotaur's face; hinting the monster he became because of his lust for glory.

This episode stars David Morrissey as Theseus, Steve Varnom as the Minotaur, Maggie O'Neill as Ariadne, Lindsay Duncan as Medea, Robert Flemyng as Aegeus, and Amanda Burton as Aithra. David Greenaway does the face performance for the Minotaur.

The episode was directed by John Madden.

=== Perseus and the Gorgon ===
The Storyteller and his dog arrive in a part of a Labyrinth which shows statues of different people and one statue detailing Perseus' encounter with the Gorgon Medusa as the Storyteller talks about it. The Storyteller describes Medusa as having terrible claws, wings of brass, a breath as foul as corpses, poisonous snakes for hair, and can turn anyone who looks at her to stone.

Owing to the oracle's prophecy that he would kill his grandfather, Perseus, the son of Danaë and Zeus, was born in darkness and captivity. Discovering Perseus's existence, King Acrisius of Argos banished Perseus and his mother to a wooden chest cast into the sea. They managed to escape death at sea where they are found by Diktys. After coming of age, the young hero vowed to bring back the head of Medusa in order to stop the evil King Polydectes from marrying his mother. He was given special weapons and armour by the gods to complete his task. He gained directions from Graeae and headed in the direction while encountering the Titan Atlas along the way. Perseus used his weapons in order to slay Medusa and avoids the other two Gorgons. Briefly interrupted by the Storyteller's Dog on why he never mentioned that there were three Gorgons after standing the statue of Perseus holding Medusa's head up, the Storyteller says that there are branches of this story. On the way back to King Polydectes, Perseus used Medusa's head to turn Atlas to stone where he became a mountain. Upon Perseus' return, King Polydectes did not believe that Perseus returned with the true head of Medusa. Perseus proves it to him by using Medusa's head to turn him to stone. Still, he could not escape the prophecy that he would one day kill his grandfather King Acrisius.

The Storyteller stated that this happened the day when King Acrisius was killed in the crowd by the discus that was hurled at him with the strength of an oracle. As the Storyteller states that Athena can corroborate the story of Perseus and Medusa, the eyes of Medusa on the sculpture of Perseus briefly open.

This episode stars Jeremy Gilley as Perseus, Frances Barber as Medusa, John McEnery as King Polydectus, Kate Buffery as Danaë, Tony Vogel as Diktys, Arthur Dignam as King Acrisius, Pat Roach as Atlas, and Trevor Martin as the voice of Atlas. The Gracea are played by Barbara Barnes, Justine Glenton, and Tacy Kneale and their voices are provided by Sandra Voe. Twin actress Tessa Vale and Deborah Vale portray the other two Gorgons.

The episode is directed by David Garfath

=== Orpheus and Eurydice ===
While rummaging through the labyrinth, the Storyteller finds an only lyre and briefly plays it. He recounts the story of Orpheus and Eurydice. A supernaturally gifted musician, son of Calliope of the Muses, Orpheus freed Eurydice from a tree. They fell in love and married. Chased by the lustful satyr Aristaeus, Eurydice trips over a poisonous snake and dies. Orpheus descends to the Underworld to plead to Hades for her return. Failing to yield to fear, he looks back and loses her forever, after which the village's wild women, vengeful over his refusal to play again, set on and behead him. (The beheading does not appear onscreen.) Orpheus's head continues to prophesy, though. Orpheus appears in a vision to the Storyteller and his dog with an idealistic message about the power of music.

Guest-starring Art Malik as Orpheus, Gina Bellman as Eurydice, Jesse Birdsall as Aristaeus, Robert Stephens as Hades, and Mel Martin as Persephone, Trevor Peacock as Charon.

The episode is directed by Tony Smith.

=== Daedalus and Icarus ===
After putting Daedalus' statue back together, it seems to come alive and sadly walk away. The Storyteller pleads for him to stay, but comes to his senses, and laments over his hurt friend. He mentions about how Daedalus built the labyrinth that he and the Storyteller's Dog are in, ships that can sail under the sea, fireworks which can knock down a wall, lenses that set together can as far as the stars, and fell from grace a broken man where he made from clay a sculpture of a child without wings which he had no control over. The Storyteller's Dog sniffs the statue and accidentally breaks it.

Daedalus was a skilful architect, inventor, and master craftsman with a dream to fly. Daedalus lived with his son Icarus. Daedalus was embarrassed and frustrated by his clumsy son and took on his nephew Talos as an apprentice. Talos displayed a skill and intellect that rivalled Daedalus's intellect. Daedalus was upset that Talos was everything his son was not. A sadistic vulture speaks to Daedalus, confronting him about his feelings towards Talos and tempts Daedalus to murder the boy. Daedalus and Icarus fled to the island of Crete, where he found himself in the court of King Minos. There he constructed the Labyrinth to contain the monstrous Minotaur. Minos cast Daedalus and Icarus into the Labyrinth to keep the exit a secret. Daedalus managed to get out of the Labyrinth for after all, he had built it. The vulture reappears calling Daedalus a murderer for killing Talos. Full of rage and guilt, Daedalus kills the vulture; declaring they shall fly to escape. They build wings with bird's feathers held by beeswax. Daedalus warned his son not to fly too close to the sun (as it would melt his wings) and not too close to the sea (as the sea spray would dampen them and weigh him down). They successfully flew from Crete, but Icarus soon flew too close to the sun. The wax holding the feathers melted and he fell to his death, drowning in the sea (which the Icarian Sea was named after). Daedalus lamented his dead son and blamed himself for the tragedy because of his arrogance and ambition.

Soon Daedalus found himself in the court of King Cocalus. There he continued his craft and skills of inventing and building. But soon King Minos, in pursuit of Daedalus, came to the court. Minos offered a reward to whoever could lead a thread through a spiral seashell. King Cocalus' daughters knew that Daedalus' talents could solve the puzzle, and gave the shell to him. Daedalus tied the string to an ant and using honey as a reward made the ant to walk through the spiral chambers until it came out the other end. When Minos saw that someone had solved the puzzle, he demanded that King Cocalus surrender Daedalus. But as he takes a bath smugly on his triumph, he is murdered by Daedalus who used his knowledge of the plumbing system to fill Minos' bath with boiling water as revenge for his part in Icarus's death. Daedalus goes on building statues of Icarus and regretting having failed him.

The Storyteller states that Daedalus couldn't come up with a way to turn back time and change the past or a way to turn solid stone in to flesh. Just then, a ceiling opens revealing the Moon as the Storyteller and his dog see two birds flying under the Moon.

This episode stars Derek Jacobi as Daedalus, Ian Hawkes as Icarus, Alastair White as Talos, John Wood as King Minos, Steve Varnom as the Minotaur, and Peter Hawkins as the voice of the Vulture (which is operated by David Barclay and David Greenaway). It also features a very young Victoria Shalet as one of King Cocalus' daughters.

The episode is directed by Paul Weiland.

== Media ==
The stories have been made available through a variety of media.

=== VHS ===
In the UK, all nine episodes of series 1 were made available in 1989 on a set of four VHS tapes released by Channel 4.

In 1999 four of the stories were re-released by Columbia Tri-Star across two VHS tapes in both the UK and the US. These were A Story Short, The Luck Child, The Soldier and Death and Sapsorrow.

=== DVD ===
Both series 1 and 2 are available in region 1 & 2 DVD format. They offer no extra features other than the original episodes in their original stereo format.

A more recent collection, Jim Henson's The Storyteller - The Definitive Collection, which contains both series in full, was released on DVD in the US in May 2006.

=== Blu-ray ===
Jim Henson's The Storyteller: The Complete Collection, featuring both the original series and Greek Myths, was supposed to be released on Blu-ray in a 2-disc set from Fabulous Films in the UK on 11 August 2025, but was later delayed to 3 November 2025. The same version of the set will also be made available in Australia from Via Vision on 20 August 2025.

=== Books ===
Two editions of the book have been published, with different illustrations. The text, by Anthony Minghella, is adapted to fit the medium of prose. One edition (ISBN 0-517-10761-9, Boxtree) features a photograph of the Storyteller on the cover; the illustrations within (by Stephen Morley) are the silhouettes as seen in the programme, and photographic stills of the episodes alongside the text. The other version (ISBN 0-679-45311-3, Random House) has full-page color hand illustrations by Darcy May, depicting the stories alongside the text.

=== Graphic novels ===
An anthology of The Storyteller was released by Archaia Entertainment on 6 December 2011. The stories announced are: "Old Nick & the Peddler" (from a Scandinavian folktale), "Puss in Boots" (from a French fairy tale), "The Milkmaid & Her Pail" (from an Aesop fable), "Old Fire Dragaman" (from an Appalachian Jack tale), "Momotaro the Peach Boy" (from a Japanese fairy tale), "An Agreement Between Friends" (from a Romanian folktale), "The Frog Who Became an Emperor" (from a Chinese folktale), "The Crane Wife" (from a Japanese folktale) and "The Witch Baby" (from a Russian fairytale), this last being adapted from one of three unproduced screenplays for the original series by Anthony Minghella. This is part of Archaia's arrangement with The Jim Henson Company, by which they are also producing Fraggle Rock and The Dark Crystal graphic novels, and a graphic novel of Henson's unproduced Jim Henson's Tale of Sand, as well as having the rights to do Labyrinth and MirrorMask. The 2024-25 anthology series Jim Henson Presents included The Storyteller as one of the featured properties, with an adaptation of The Tortoise and the Birds in the second issue.

This was followed by other miniseries based on different themes including

- The Storyteller: Witches where the stories include "The Magic Swan Goose & the Lord of the Forest," "The Snow Witch," "The Phantom Isle", and "Vasilissa the Beautiful", adapted from another unused screenplay.
- The Storyteller: Dragons which featured the stories "The Son of the Serpent" (based on Native American folktales of the Horned Serpent), "The Worm of Lambton", "Albina" (a gender-swapped retelling of the Russian story of Alyosha Popovich and Tugarin), and "Samurai's Sacrifice" (based around the alleged Japanese folk tale A Story of Oki Islands).
- The Storyteller: Giants, featuring "The Peach's Son" (a Momotaro variant), "The Tailor's Daughter" (from Russian, Norwegian and German fairytales), "Pru and the Formorian Giants" (from an Irish folktale), and "The Fisherman and the Giant"
- The Storyteller: Fairies, featuring "The Elf Queen and the Shepherd" (from an Icelandic folktale), "Faerie Hill" (from a Danish folktale), "The Pond" (based on the Menehune of Hawaiian folklore), and "The Fairy Pool".
- The Storyteller: Sirens, featuring "The Fisherman and the Mermaid" (from a Polish folktale), "Empress Wa" (from Chinese legend), "One Spared to the Sea" (from a Scottish folktale), and "Lorelei: Daughter of the Rhine" (from a German folktale).
- The Storyteller: Ghosts, featuring ghost stories about the Myling of Scandinavian folklore, the Ahp of Khmer folklore, the Banshee from Irish folklore, and Weles from Slavic folklore.
- The Storyteller: Tricksters, featuring tales of Anansi, Eshu, Loki, and Reynard the Fox
- The Storyteller: Shapeshifters, featuring the Children of Lir, The Dancers (inspired by Lipan Apache heritage), the Kitsune, and the Ole Heg.

== Awards ==
Series 1 was nominated for and won several awards.

Year	Result	Award	Category/Recipient(s)
1987	Won	Emmy Award	Outstanding Children's Program; Jim Henson (executive producer); Mark Shivas (producer); For episode Hans My Hedgehog.
1988	Nominated	Emmy Award	Outstanding Children's Program; Jim Henson (executive producer); Duncan Kenworthy (producer); For episode A Story Short.
1988	Nominated	Emmy Award	Outstanding Children's Program; Jim Henson (executive producer); Duncan Kenworthy (producer); For episode The Luck Child.
1989	Won	BAFTA TV Award	Best Children's Programme (Entertainment/Drama); Duncan Kenworthy
1989	Won	BAFTA TV Award	Best Costume Design; Ann Hollowood
1989	Nominated	BAFTA TV Award	Best Make Up; Sally Sutton

== Reboot ==
On February 19, 2019, it was announced that a reboot series was being developed by Neil Gaiman, and produced by The Jim Henson Company and Fremantle. However, it never came to be.
