= Camille Bonora =

American Muppet performer and philanthropist

- Born: Camilla Bonora; May 13, 1956 (age 70)
- Education: Catholic University of America
- Occupations: Puppeteer, comedian, philanthropist
- Years active: 1985–1996
- Known for: Muppet performer
- Television: Sesame Street; The Jim Henson Hour
- Spouse: Emmanuel Kampouris (m. 1992)

Camille Bonora (also known as Camille Kampouris; born May 13, 1956) is an American former Muppet performer. She currently serves on the board of BibleMesh online theological studies, as well as a member of the Kairos Journal editorial board.

Bonora, a native of New Jersey, graduated from Catholic University of America, was a member of Phi Beta Kappa and initially worked in musical comedy and improvisational comedy. Bonora was also one of the puppeteers who performed The Muppets from 1985 to 1997. Bonora influenced Joey Mazzarino when she taught an improvisation class at Fordham University, and eventually introduced him to Jim Henson. Mazzarino later became the head writer for Sesame Street and also worked on The Adventures of Elmo in Grouchland, Muppets from Space, and Kermit's Swamp Years.

In 1996, she later retired from performing and co-founded the Kairos Journal with her husband Emmanuel A. Kampouris. She serves on its editorial board. The journal is an online tool to assist pastors and church leadership with Biblical references, historical precedents, quotations and writing, and commentary.

== Early life and career ==
Bonora was born in Morristown, New Jersey on May 13, 1956. She was raised in a devout Roman Catholic household and prayed every evening, but by the time she reached high school she said she had drifted from God.

She moved to New York to get into acting, but lost her confidence after many rejections at auditions. On the advice of a friend who was a comedian, she took a comedic improvisation class to boost her confidence. At the class, she observed two performers who particularly impressed her with their skills. Subsequently, she pursued their company and found that they were Christian. In the conversations that developed, the two gave her materials to read, spoke to her about God, and prayed with her, also giving her a verse that she said "touched her heart" for many years and helped her find purpose in life: Psalm 37:4.

The next five years for Bonora included theater comedy and comedic improvisation. She performed sketches and said that the years were difficult and financially lean, but she maintained some success with her improvisation show. The period enabled her to sharpen her character creation and improvisational skills.

She said she was puzzled when Muppet performers wanted her to audition, as she hadn't been a puppeteer. In fact, when she was asked to perform with a puppet, all she could do was shake it. However, the group enjoyed her voices and characters and asked if they could train her, which she accepted. They told her it would take four years to learn the craft, but she was able to pick up the skills quickly and was a lead Muppet performer in one year.

One of the first projects she was assigned to, in 1985, was a short-lived CBS series Little Muppet Monsters. Although it was not a success on the air, it was an opportunity for Bonora to learn more about puppeteering from mentor Richard Hunt.

In 1990, with Ben Harney, she co-wrote a Christian home video series for children called Ben & Eddie, and performed the character of Eddie. Although the show was not officially affiliated with the Muppets, their production facility and puppeteers were used. The show was about Eddie, a puppet dog born in Central Park who was abandoned by his mother, adopted by Ben, a human.

Bonora considered herself "the church lady" of the Muppets as sometimes she would be late to script readings due to being in church or doing charitable volunteer work.

The bulk of her recurring puppet work was done on Sesame Street performing many of the characters on that show, including Goldilocks, Clementine, Ruby Monster, and Meryl Sheep.

== Filmography ==
- Muppet Meeting Films - Deanna, Clarissa, Additional Muppets (1985-1993)
- Little Muppet Monsters - Molly Monster
- Sesame Street - Agnes, Annette Monster, Britta, Celeste, Clementine, Deirdre, Glo, Goldilocks, Herry's Mother, Ilsa, Juliet, Lady Agatha, Mama Bear, Meryl Sheep, Miss Marble, Ruby Monster, Sally Soho, Stella, Stephanie Chicken, Umeko, Vivian Vase, Additional Muppets (1985-1996)
- The Muppets: A Celebration of 30 Years - Molly Monster, Additional Muppets
- The Tale of the Bunny Picnic - Twitch Bunny
- The Christmas Toy - Meteora
- Inner Tube - Maya
- The Comic Strip (TV series) (1987)
- Tiger Sharks (1987) - Octavia
- Ben & Eddie (1990) - Eddie
- A Muppet Family Christmas - Additional Muppets
- Jim Henson's Play-Along Video - Kai-Lee, Stella, Mergie, Doris Bird, Herself
- Free to Be... A Family - Meryl Sheep
- Dog City - Miss Belle, Dalmatian Army member, Additional Muppets
- The Song of the Cloud Forest - Blanche, Ruth
- The Jim Henson Hour - Fern, Twitch Bunny, Jojo, Vivian Eggloff, Herself, additional Muppets
- Furby Boom- Hyper Personality
- The Muppets at Walt Disney World - Yolanda Rat, Frog, Additional Muppets
- The Muppets Celebrate Jim Henson - Additional Muppets
- Big Bird's Birthday or Let Me Eat Cake - Ruby Monster
- Elmo's Sing Along Guessing Game - The Director
- "Kokomo" music video - Additional Muppets
- We All Sing Together - Herry's Mother
- Muppet Sing-Alongs Muppet Treasure Island - Girl Pirate
- Muppet Sing-Alongs It's Not Easy Bein Green - Additional Muppets
- The Wubbulous World of Dr. Seuss - Sally Spingel Spungel Sporn (episode: The Muckster)
