= Democracy Service Medal =

This list of recipients of the Democracy Service Medal covers recipients of the National Endowment for Democracy's Democracy Service Medal. The Medal was established in 1999 and awarded annually, sometimes to more than one person.

== Recipients ==
- 2025: Gedhun Choekyi Nyima, the 11th Panchen Lama
- 2024: Lobsang Sangay
- 2016: Tenzin Delek Rinpoche (Tibet) (Posthumous)
- 2013: Vytautas Landsbergis (Lithuania)
- 2012: Madeleine K. Albright (USA), George P. Shultz (USA)
- 2011: Laura Pollán, Cuba; Jean Bethke Elshtain, USA; Floribert Chebeya, Democratic Republic of the Congo
- 2010: Vin Weber, USA; the 14th Dalai Lama, Tibet; Francis Fukuyama, USA
- 2009: Leszek Kołakowski, Poland
- 2008: Max Kampelman, USA; Tom Lantos, USA
- 2007: Morton I. Abramowitz, USA; Emmanuel Kampouris, USA; Václav Havel, Czech Republic
- 2006: Thomas R. Donahue, USA
- 2005: John C. Whitehead, USA; John Richardson, Jr., USA
- 2004: Bob Graham, USA; Seymour Martin Lipset, USA; Matthew McHugh, USA
- 2003: Enrique Bolaños, Nicaragua; Donald M. Payne, USA
- 2002: Chen-Wu Sue-jen, Taiwan; Jan Nowak, Poland; Paula J. Dobriansky, USA
- 2001: John Brademas, USA; Fred Iklé, USA; Richard Lugar, USA; Stephen Solarz, USA
- 2000: John B. Hurford, USA
- 1999: Lech Wałęsa, Poland; Lane Kirkland, USA; Alexandr Vondra, Czech Republic; Martin Butora, Slovakia
