= Emmanuel Kampouris =

American businessman and philanthropist (born 1934)

- Born: December 14, 1934 (age 91); Egypt
- Occupations: Business executive, philanthropist
- Known for: Chairman and CEO of American Standard Companies
- Spouses: Myrto Stellatos (m. 1959, d. 1992); Camille Bonora (m. 1992)
- Children: 2
- Relatives: Elena Kampouris (granddaughter)

Emmanuel Andrew Kampouris (born December 14, 1934) is an American businessman and philanthropist. He spent more than 30 years with American Standard Companies, a conglomerate known for manufacturing plumbing fixtures and air conditioning equipment, including 11 years as chief executive of the company, where he implemented efficiency processes for which Fortune described him as a "prophet of zero working capital". Born in Egypt to a Greek family, Kampouris was educated in England before joining a family ceramic manufacturing business. After retiring from American Standard in 1999, Kampouris remained active as a corporate board member, philanthropist and film producer.

== Early life and education ==
According to a biography published by Mark Coppenger on which Kampouris collaborated, he was born in Egypt in 1934 to Eurydice Caralli Kampouris, a concert pianist, and Andrew Kampouris, a Greek cotton businessman. He grew up speaking Greek, English, Italian and Arabic and was raised in the Greek Orthodox Church. His primary and secondary education was at the Mansourah Greek School and Victoria College in Egypt, then at the King's School, Bruton, in England, where he was a fencing champion. He matriculated at Christ Church, Oxford in 1954 and studied law.

== Business career ==
According to Coppenger, Kampouris returned to Egypt after his studies and joined his father's business. After the Kampouris family's cotton farms were nationalized by Egyptian ruler Gamal Abdel Nasser, he joined his wife's family business, a stoneware concern that manufactured sewer pipes. He undertook a chemistry course with a focus on ceramic technology at North Staffordshire College of Technology. The company relocated its manufacturing operations from Egypt to Greece, and Kampouris became plant manager there. Through business connections, he recommended that Ideal Standard, then the European brand of American Standard, build a plant in Greece.

In 1966, Kampouris joined American Standard's new Greece operation as general manager of manufacturing. He rose through the ranks, relocating to the United States to become vice president of the international and export group in 1979 and later becoming senior vice president for building supplies.

=== American Standard CEO ===
When Kampouris became president and CEO in 1989, American Standard had taken on over $3 billion in debt in a management buyout the year before that he led as a senior executive to fend off a hostile takeover proposal by Black+Decker. The early 1990s recession reduced construction and cargo shipping and pinched American Standard's business lines. Facing bankruptcy, Kampouris adopted demand flow technology (DFT) to streamline American Standard's manufacturing processes and supply chain and tap into the company's $735 million in working capital. By retooling to manufacture goods on demand, the company would shorten the period between spending on production and payment by customers and spend less on inventory.

Kampouris's goal was to reduce working capital to zero by 1996; by 1994, it absorbed 5 percent of sales compared to an industry average of 15 percent. Some plants were seeing inventory turnover figures as high as 40, compared with an average of four across most companies, resulting in increases in cash flow. General Electric's Jack Welch sent teams to three American Standard plants and personally visited American Standard to learn the methodology.

He also sought to roll out DFT in the company's white-collar office environment, which he acknowledged was more difficult. Among his office efficiency decisions was the use of cubicles for all office staff. The company initiated a major expansion in China in 1994. After the 1992 low-flush toilet mandate, he defended American Standard's products on the market but commented that the regulation was burdensome on the industry.

Kampouris led American Standard through an initial public offering in 1995 that raised $270 million and turned its first profit that year since the 1988 LBO. The company's stock price multiplied eight times from 1988 through 1996. He pushed the company beyond air conditioning, truck brakes and plumbing fixtures into medical diagnostic equipment In 1997, Kampouris turned down a takeover bid by Tyco International, a move that disappointed shareholders and contributed to downgrades by investment analysts. American Standard offered an employee stock ownership program that saw a quarter of the company's stock owned by its employees by 1999.

Having added the title of chairman in 1993, Kampouris retired as chairman and CEO in December 1999, receiving $4 million in bonuses in addition to a $13.8 million lump-sum retirement payment.

=== Management style ===
At American Standard, Kampouris emphasized flexible roles that would give employees opportunities to take on new work and build their skills. Although his formal title was chairman, president and CEO, Kampouris eschewed his executive title, using the term "corporate leader" on his business card. Executives at American Standard were described as "coaches" whose role is to guide employees on their career paths. "It has meant learning to manage our egos, and accepting that we could learn as much from blue-collar workers as from each other," Kampouris told The New York Times in 1999. Coaches were rewarded with bonuses and promotions based on the performance of the employees they were responsible for coaching.

As a convert to evangelicalism, Kampouris cited Nehemiah, who according to the biblical narrative oversaw the rebuilding of the walls of Jerusalem, as a leadership role model.

== Other business activities ==
After leaving American Standard, Kampouris served on several boards. He was one of the first directors of Alticor, the parent company of Amway, not to come from the DeVos or Van Andel families. He was also a board member of the U.S. Chamber of Commerce, Horizon Blue Cross Blue Shield of New Jersey, the National Endowment for Democracy and the Hudson Institute. He was awarded the Democracy Service Medal by the NED in 2007.

Kampouris and his second wife Camille co-produced the 2024 Angel Studios drama Bonhoeffer, based on the life of theologican Dietrich Bonhoeffer. Inspired by Eric Metaxas's biography of Bonhoeffer, the film took 12 years to develop and produce.

== Philanthropy ==
The Kampourises have been active in a range of philanthropic activities. They were early supporters of Metaxas's "Socrates in the City" events. They are co-founders of the Kairos Journal, an online publication aimed at pastors, and BibleMesh, an online theological training program.

== Political activities ==
Kampouris was head of the finance committee for Dan Quayle's 2000 presidential campaign.

== Personal life ==
Coppenger's biography recounts that Kampouris married Myrto Stellatos on July 4, 1959, at the Cathedral of the Annunciation, Alexandria. They had two sons and five grandchildren, including actress Elena Kampouris. Myrto died from breast cancer in 1992. Kampouris was remarried to Muppet performer and comedienne Camille Bonora. Bonora retired from performing with the Muppets in 1998.

Although he grew up Greek Orthodox, Kampouris became fond of Anglican worship while studying at Oxford. Around the time of Myrto's death, he began attending David Wilkerson's Times Square Church and converted to evangelical Christianity. He is a member of the Anglican Church in North America and a trustee and guarantor of the Global Fellowship of Confessing Anglicans (GAFCON). In this role, he is a member of the Global Anglican Council established to oversee GAFCON following its March 2026 meeting in Abuja, Nigeria. Kampouris was awarded an honorary doctorate from Ajayi Crowther University for his services to GAFCON.
