= Gallowglass (disambiguation) =

Gallowglass were a class of mercenary warriors.

Gallowglass may also refer to:

- Gallowglass (novel), a novel by Barbara Vine
- Gallowglass (miniseries), the television adaptation of the novel
