= Brett Whiteley House =

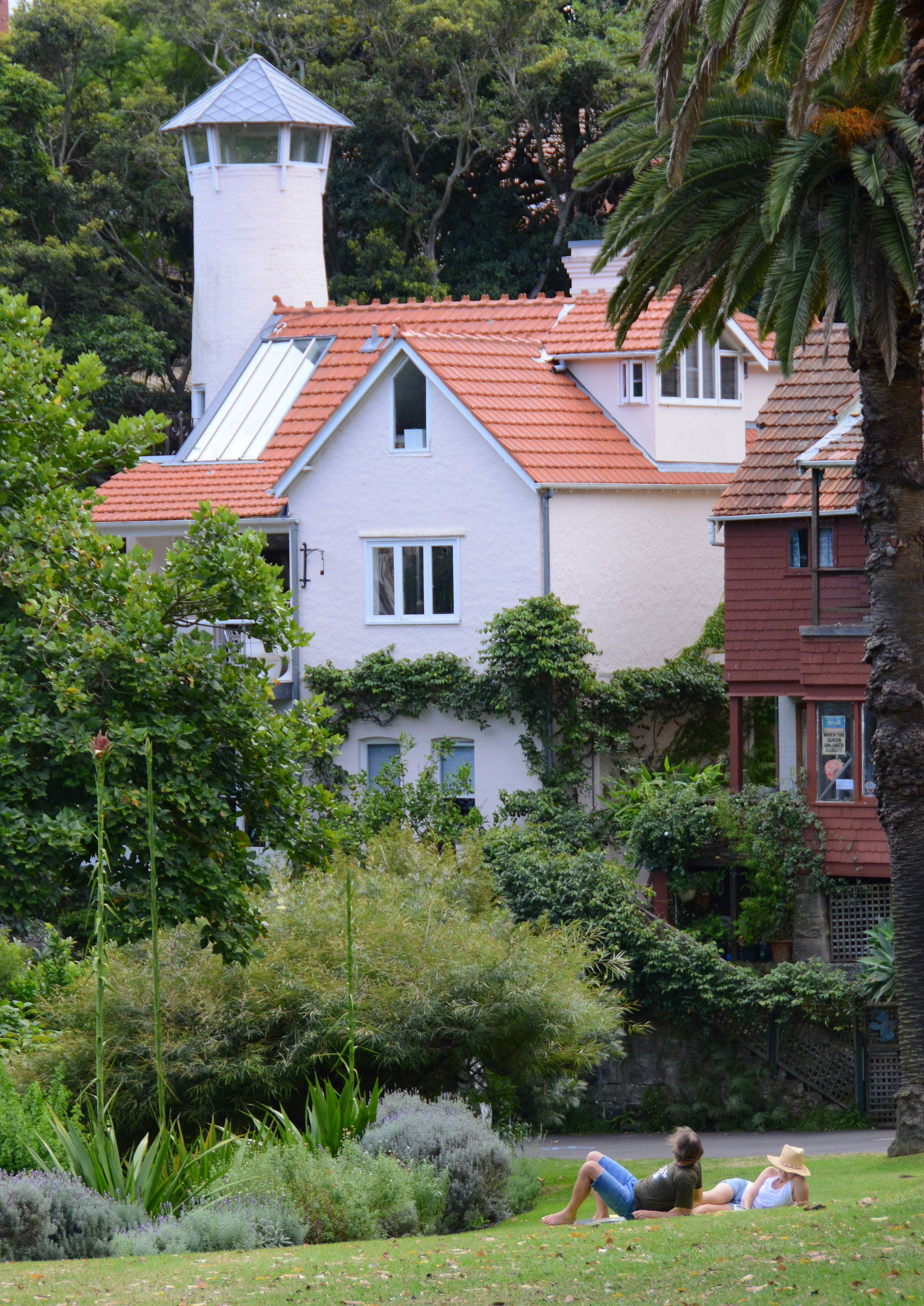
- Brett Whiteley House in 2016

- Location within Sydney Location within Australia
- 33°50′38″S 151°12′31″E
- Location: 1 Walker Street, Lavender Bay, New South Wales, Australia

History
- Built: 1905

Site notes
- Architectural style: Federation

New South Wales Heritage Register
- Official name: Brett Whiteley House and Visual Curtilage; Lochgyle
- Type: State heritage (landscape)
- Designated: 23 March 2018
- Reference no.: 1949
- Type: Other - Landscape - Cultural
- Category: Landscape - Cultural
- Builders: Henry Green

Brett Whiteley House is a heritage-listed arts and crafts studio and residence in Lavender Bay, New South Wales, Australia. It was built during 1905 by Henry Green. It is also known as Brett Whiteley House and Visual Curtilage and Lochgyle. It was added to the New South Wales State Heritage Register on 23 March 2018.

== History ==
The Whiteley House is located on the 20 hectares (50 acres) that was granted to James Milson between 1821 and 1825. Milson provided fresh water and ballast for passing ships as well as grazing cattle and producing milk. After a fire in 1826 he built a large two storey home called Brisbane House and another called Grantham. Both have since been demolished.

The house location overlooks Lavender Bay which was once known as Hulk Bay. This name may originate from the presence of the convict prison hulk which was once moored in the Bay to provide accommodation for convicts.

Lavender Bay, and later, suburb was named after George Lavender. He was an officer in charge of the ship called "Phoenix" that housed convicts moored in this bay. He married Billy Blue's daughter, Susannah, and eventually made this district his home.

The land upon which the Whiteley House stands was purchased from the Milson family by speculative builder Henry Green in 1905. The house is one of a group of five Federation-style houses built on a triangular shaped allotment created by the formation of Walker Street, Lavender Street and foreshore land proclaimed as a public recreational bathing reserve in 1868. Green sold the house to Abraham Wallace Taylor, storekeeper, in 1908. After Taylor's death in 1929 Sarah Taylor took in lodgers and it is possible that the conversion to two flats occurred at this time. Brett Whiteley, Wendy Whiteley and their young daughter Arkie moved into the house in 1969 after returning from a lengthy time overseas. The Whiteleys had been in London, New York and Fiji. They visited a Sydney friend, Rollin Schlicht, in a ramshackle Federation house - the rent was cheap, so they moved in.

In 1974 the Whiteleys purchased the whole property and worked with architect Tony Edye who helped return the building to a single dwelling making the most of the views and providing a studio space. Back then, nobody wanted to live near the harbour because it was a working industrial site' says Wendy Whiteley. "They used to empty everything into it and it stank! Later, we bought it and knocked down the (internal) walls. Not long after, (artist) Peter Kingston moved next door. Soon, the (Tim & Janet) Storriers came and we became a tight little enclave. Lavender Bay was run down, a dead end, but to us it seemed magical."

=== Life of Brett Whiteley ===
Brett Whiteley was born in Sydney in 1939 and grew up at Longueville. He was sent to boarding school at the Scots School in Bathurst and was awarded first prize in the Young Painters' section of the Bathurst Show. He attended Scots College in Sydney briefly in 1954-55 before leaving school in 1956. After leaving school he took night classes in drawing at the Julian Ashton Art School in Sydney while holding down a job at an advertising agency. In 1960, aged 21, Whiteley left Australia on a Travelling Art Scholarship (judged by Sir Russell Drysdale at the Art Gallery of New South Wales), and by 1961 had settled in London where his work was shown at the Whitechapel and Marlborough galleries. In London, he produced a series of abstractions, one of which (Untitled red painting) was bought by the Tate Gallery, making Whiteley the youngest artist to enter the collection of Tate Modern.

In London, he met many other painters, including fellow Australians, Arthur Boyd and John Passmore. In 1962 he won second prize in the Biennale de Paris (International Biennale for Young Artists) and had his first solo exhibition. He married Wendy Julius the same year. In 1967 he was awarded a scholarship by the Harkness Fellowship which enabled him to live and work in New York for 18 months. From there he and his family stayed in Fiji before returning to Sydney in 1969.

A well-publicised drug charge in Fiji saw the Whiteleys' permanent return to Australia. After visiting a friend (Note: Architect and artist Rollin Schlicht.) who lived in the downstairs flat of the house at 1 Walker Street, Brett, Wendy and their daughter, Arkie, then aged five years, moved there in 1969, renting the upstairs flat. The lower level became Brett's first studio in Sydney. In an interview with the Sydney Morning Herald in 2012 Wendy described how they came to stay at Lavender Bay:

"We kind of fell in love with the bay and Arkie was sick of being shunted around," she says. "She was just about to be five and she wanted to go to a school where she wouldn't be dragged out of six months later. It became the central focus, which we'd never really had before. We were gypsies."

— Wendy Whiteley, in the Sydney Morning Herald, 29 April 2012.

The house was one of a row of five Federation houses next to Clark Park. Their home became a "scene" well-managed by Wendy. Raucous parties, fuelled by loud music and alcohol, drew the famous and infamous - writers, poets, artists, actors and musicians. The Schlicts left Lavender Bay for the inner city around 1971. The Whiteleys bought the house in 1974 and began converting it back into a single dwelling, knocking down walls to open up the living space, installing arches and eventually adding a distinctive tower. Also in 1974, Brett debuted his first series of artworks inspired by Lavender Bay, at an exhibition at the Australian Galleries in Melbourne. This heralded a new phase in his artistic development, which would produce many of his most-highly prized works over the next 15 years.

Whiteley was one of a collective of writers, musicians, artists and performers that lived, worked, performed and exhibited at the Yellow House at 59 Macleay Street, Potts Point from 1970 to 1972. It was established by the artist Martin Sharp in 1970 and inspired by Van Gogh's Yellow House in Arles, France. Young artists that participated included George Gittoes, Peter Weir, Jim Sharman and Whiteley. It is one of the few remnant buildings associated with the artists' quarter of Potts Point and Kings Cross and the Bohemian period that lasted from the 1930s through to the 1970s.

Between 1971 and 1975 Brett worked in the sitting room of the house at 1 Walker Street and undertook his larger works at a studio at the Old Gas Works in Waverton (which for a short time he shared with artist Tim Storrier. After the house renovations, Brett could work from his Lavender Bay studio in Walker Street.

In 1974 one of the downstairs flats in the house at 3 Walker Street became home to artist, writer and quiet observer Tom Carment, then 19 years old. During the time he spent there, Tom got to know several of his artist neighbours. He left before the year was up and artist Peter Kingston soon moved in. Kingston - known to his friends as "Kingo" - already knew many of the personalities of the Lavender Bay scene. In 1970 he had made an experimental film called "Brett and butter and jam on his face" that featured Whiteley. A modest inheritance on the death of his father allowed Kingston to buy the lower level of the house at 3 Walker Street in 1974. Later he bought the top level and combined his living and studio spaces. Kingston was invited to assist fellow artist Martin Sharp in giving Luna Park, at the south-eastern end of the bay, a pop art makeover. Friends since school days, Sharp and Kingston shared an enthusiasm and nostalgia for the joyous fairground art of Arthur Barton, one of Luna Park's original artists. Several other artists joined the eruption of creativity at Luna Park in the mid-1970s, including Garry Shead. Like Kingston, he was a contributing cartoonist for the controversial satirical magazine "Oz", co-edited by Sharp. He also created a series of experimental films featuring several of his friends. One, inspired by the character of the Phantom from the comic strip by Lee Falk, was filmed in Lavender Bay and featured Kingston, Wendy Whiteley and a brief appearance by Brett.

While living and working at Lavender Bay, Whiteley produced a series of major paintings. Many of these successively won Australia's most prestigious art prizes. Some of these works include the Archibald Prize winning "Self portrait in the studio" 1976, Sir John Sulman Prize winning "Interior with time past" 1976 and Wynne Prize for "The jacaranda tree" (on Sydney Harbour) 1977.

In 1975 he was awarded the Sir William Anglis Memorial Art Prize, Melbourne. In 1978 he was again awarded the Archibald Prize for "Art, life and the other thing" (1978) and the Sir John Sulman Prize for "The yellow nude" (1978). He also won the Wynne Prize for "Summer at Carcoar" (1978). Whiteley's trifecta (Archibald, Wynne and Sulman) of 1978 continues to be unique in Australian art history. He won the Wynne Prize in 1984 for "The South Coast after rain".

In 1970 Brett met young sculptor Joel Elenberg in Melbourne and for a decade the pair shared an intense friendship. Following Elenberg's diagnosis of lymphoma in 1979, he moved to Sydney and lived next door to the Whiteleys. Brett spent three months in Bali with his dying friend Joel in 1980. Today, one of Elenberg's sculptures in bronze, "Head" (c. 1970) stands at the entrance to the magnificent garden created by Wendy outside the houe; nearby is a carved timber sculpture of a nude by Brett.

In 1981 Brett rented a studio at Reiby Place in Circular Quay. Over the next two years he travelled to Europe and to Central Australia. In 1985 Whiteley bought an old T-shirt factory in Raper Street, Surry Hills, which he converted into a studio. Whiteley used the Raper Street Studio, which has become a permanent museum studio/gallery. He lived there from 1987 and moved there permanently following his divorce from Wendy in 1989 and travelled extensively.

In 1991, Brett Whiteley was awarded an Order of Australia (General Division). He died in Thirroul in 1992.

=== Residence at No. 1 Walker Street ===
The house at No. 1 Walker Street is at the lower south western end of the group of five Federation style houses overlooking Clark Park and Lavender Bay. The building was converted to two flats c. 1929. The Whiteley's purchased it in 1974 and reinstated it as a single dwelling, with an eclectic set of features. A tower addition was added, enclosed verandas were opened up, a new side entrance and south entrance created and new windows on the west and south elevations. The white washed sitting room has panoramic views of Sydney Harbour with views of Lavender Bay Jetty and the surrounding bay. This view - including interiors and exterior scenery - was to be the subject of many of Whiteley's iconic paintings. The downstairs space was converted into Brett Whiteley's studio. Some internal walls have been removed to allow Whiteley to work in the sitting room level as well as the studio level.

==== Lavender Bay and Whiteley's Art ====
The body of work undertaken by Brett Whiteley at Lavender Bay between 1974 and 1981 is considered some of his best and is perhaps that for which he is best known to the general public. The house and its environs are a representation of Brett Whiteley's life and work. The immediate setting of 1 Walker Street assists in the understanding of his creative output; the birds, the trees, the harbour and its icons. The house and its viewshed are a link to his most awarded and most popular works. Architectural details and spaces of the house feature in many of his works as do features of the outdoors, including his Archibald Prize winning work "Self portrait in the studio" 1976, Sir John Sulman Prize winning work "Interior with time past" 1976 and Wynne Prize for "The jacaranda tree" (On Sydney Harbour) 1977.

Whiteley's Lavender Bay phase constituted a substantial and highly significant part of his artistic career and this is well attested by both the prolific output and the successive years of critical acclaim that his works of this period attracted - not least the impressive list of major prizes won during the 1970s. Wendy Whiteley summed it up in her submission to the SHR listing proposal in 2015 that "through his art, the view from the house at Lavender Bay has become an indelible part of the story of Australian art". In the words of Brett Whiteley: he expresses the importance of Lavender Bay within his life's body of works: "...two-thirds of Braque's work is table tops, there's Morandi's bottles, Lloyd Rees's hills... My repeating theme - a subject I will always go back to until I die - Lavender Bay" (from McGrath, 1992 quoted in Britton, 2016).

==== Lavender Bay: Key recurring themes and important views from 1 Walker Street ====
Lavender Bay scenery from 1 Walker Street has been depicted by Whiteley in numerous works: paintings, drawings, etchings, silkscreen prints, onto objects such as vases, plates and pots. Within these works there is understandably much variation in the permutations of particular elements Whiteley chose to include. Sometimes the Harbour Bridge appears, or the Opera House or there are glimpses of built environment across Milsons Point or, rarely even Harry Seidler's Blues Point tower.

Across the many works featuring Lavender Bay, these key elements are all present with their spatial order rearranged according to poetic and compositional priorities. Some of these key scenic elements that form part of the viewshed include the bay and harbour waterscape; the Lavender Bay shorelines; the group of three Washingtonia robusta palms at the foreshore; Lavender Bay ferry wharf; moored yachts; vegetated foreshore, Fig Trees and Canary Island palms. Often the foreground to many of his major works included the interiors of his residence at 1 Walker Street. In some works, he emphasised the interiors of his residence, with glimpses of the key scenic elements, subtly in the background ('Self portrait in the studio' 1976, "Interior with time past" 1976, "The Cat" 1980, "The window, Lavender Bay" 1980, "Interior with bull-bull egg sculpture" 1980 for example) or illustrated the scenic harbour with elements of his interior in the foreground ('The Balcony 2' 1975, "Feeding the doves" 1979 for example).

In addition, the brick viaduct at the end of Walker Street reserve and Quibaree Park, the Sydney Harbour Bridge, parts of Circular Quay and Luna Park are all occasionally featured. Whiteley has included the rail lines along Lavender foreshore in some of his works. A number of prominent trees and distinct vegetation are also included in his art which highlights the importance of these vegetated areas.

The following provides a brief list of the recurring theme and elements featured in some of his paintings- this list is not exhaustive by any account, rather it is provided as examples that illustrate his works portraying the harbour:

- the bay and harbour waterscape: vast area of water as a colour field dominates some major works as the "Big Orange" 1974, "The Balcony 2" 1975, "The jacaranda tree (on Sydney Harbour)" 1977, "Lavender Bay with palms" 1974, "Sydney Harbour in the rain" 1976–77,'Grey Harbour' 1978 for example.

- the Lavender Bay shorelines: either or both of the extended Lavender Bay shorelines are used to frame his works: "The balcony 2" 1975, The jacaranda tree (on Sydney Harbour)' 1977, for example.
- the groups of three Washingtonia robusta palms: examples include "Lavender Bay in the rain" 1981, "Sydney Harbour by night" 1981, "Lavender Bay at dusk" 1984, "Big orange" 1974 for example.
- Lavender Bay ferry wharf: "Grey Harbour" 1978, "Sydney Harbour by night" 1981 for example.
- moored yachts: many works that feature the harbour and Lavender Bay include various renditions of the yachts for example.
- vegetated foreshore: "Clark Gardens" 1978, "The turquoise prince" 1979, "The split second summer began" 1979, for example.
- Fig tree: "Moreton Bay fig" 1975, "Moreton Bay fig" 1979 (etching), for example.
- Canary Island palms: "Clark Gardens" 1978, "The turquoise prince" 1979, "The split second summer began" 1979, for example.

Brick viaduct: "The split second summer began" 1979, 'Sketchbook pages (BWS 1063 pages 35 verso & 36 1975+)'

==== Wendy's Secret Garden ====
When the Whiteleys first moved into Lavender Bay, they considered the fig tree on the railway land in front of their house as an extension of their outdoor environment. The fig tree was drawn and painted by Brett Whiteley in numerous sensually anthropomorphised versions. A sculpture by Joel Elenberg titled "Head" was placed by Brett and Joel under this tree. The original marble sculpture was later replaced with a bronze cast as people began to graffiti the original.

Following Brett Whiteley's untimely death in 1992, Wendy Whiteley started clearing the land below the fig tree on part of the unused railway land at the foot of her house. Over the years, with help larger areas were added, transforming the unused railway land into an intimately landscaped guerrilla garden.

A number of sculptures were added to the garden by Wendy Whiteley. Some rail artefacts, found while clearing the land were incorporated into the landscaping, all of these features are documented in detail in the publication on the garden titled "Wendy Whiteley and the Secret Garden" by Janet Hawley in 2015. The website for Wendy Whiteley's Secret Garden provides further details about the garden, its history, map and artefacts on display.

The garden on RailCorp land is now secured by a 30-year lease. The land incorporating Wendy Whiteley's Secret Garden is now subdivided from the rest of the RailCorp land. RailCorp can revoke the lease for essential Railway purposes only and/or to perform any of its duties and functions under the Railway legislation.

Since the publication of the book Wendy Whiteley and the Secret Garden by Janet Hawley in 2015, the announcement of the lease by the then Premier Mike Baird in 2016 and its listing on popular tourism sites, the garden has gained popularity. Visitor's books maintained by Wendy Whiteley at the garden are an evidence of the increasing visitation to the garden. In March 2017, Premier Gladys Berejiklian announced the creation of a trust fund to further secure the future of Wendy Whiteley's garden. The trust fund, yet to be established, includes a government contribution of $30,000.

== Description ==
No.1 Walker Street

The house known as No.1 Walker Street is at the lower south western end of the group of five Federation style houses overlooking Clark Park and Lavender Bay. The house is two storey with painted brick walls and contemporary alterations. The building was formerly converted to two flats c. 1929.

After the Whiteleys purchased the house in 1974, it was altered and reinstated to a single dwelling. A tower addition was added, enclosed verandas were opened up, a new side entrance and south entrance created and new windows added on the west and south elevations. The tower has a terracotta tiled conical roof with strip windows up the southern side. The attic tower has windows on all sides and the adjacent gable end has been glazed for the Attic bedroom. The western side of the roof has large skylights. A timber stair with tree branches for railings, leads from the Walker Street steps to the first floor. The west elevation has been modified and has a set of windows along the first floor level. The white washed sitting room has panoramic views of Sydney Harbour with views of Lavender Bay Jetty and the surrounding bay. This view - including interior scenes and exterior scenery - was to be the subject of many of Whiteley's iconic paintings. The downstairs space was converted into Brett Whiteley's studio. Some internal walls have been removed to allow Whiteley to work in the sitting room level as well as the studio level. On the sitting room level walls have been opened up with arches making the level open plan and linking it to the tower.

Settings and Views

A significant component of the setting of the house is the vegetated slope down to Lavender Bay and Sydney Harbour. The setting includes railway land and parklands including Clark Park, a section of Quibaree Park, Lavender Bay foreshore and Lavender Bay waters. The house is separated from the harbour by railway sidings and a brick viaduct, parkland, foreshore reserve and a garden created by Wendy Whiteley on unused railway land from 1992. The garden, now known as Wendy Whiteley's Secret Garden is leased from RailCorp by North Sydney Council.

The house enjoys extensive views over a canopy of trees and glimpses of railway infrastructure to the waterscape of Lavender Bay. The foreground includes a mature Moreton Bay fig (Ficus macrophylla), and fig trees along Walker Street Reserve. Prominent palms (Phoenix canriensis) in Clark Park frame the views to the left and Washingtonia (or Californian desert fan) palms (Washingtonia robusta) close to the Lavender Bay ferry wharf provide a focal point. The views include the brick viaduct, rail lines, Lavender Bay ferry wharf, which were included in numerous of Brett Whiteley's smaller, though no less engaging, works including drawings and prints. The larger view incorporates iconic Sydney landmarks: Luna Park, the Sydney Harbour Bridge, the Sydney Opera House, the Walsh Bay piers and Lavender Bay waterscape all of which featured in many of Whiteley's works.

=== Condition ===
As at 17 July 2017, the house is in excellent condition and continues to be the home of Wendy Whiteley. The setting is intact as it was when Brett Whiteley created his notable Lavender Bay works though the Moreton Bay fig tree at the front has now become a large tree framing views of the harbour from the house and Wendy's garden now obscures most views to the railway siding. Nevertheless, there exists a readily appreciable viewshed projecting out from the southern openings of the house and tower at 1 Walker Street.

As a personalised harbourside residence of a celebrity artist continuing in the ownership of the family, the house is intact in the context of the modified built form occupied by Brett Whiteley between 1969 and 1989. All the major spaces and architectural features, such as the studio, conical tower and glazed southern elevation remain. The fig tree in front of the house is now overgrown providing a filtered harbour view, however, the features painted by Brett Whiteley remain.

=== Modifications and dates ===
The following modifications have been made to the site:

- c. 1929 – Converted to two flats
- 1974 – Modifications by Brett and Wendy Whiteley include: Tower and attic level, internal walls removed and planning opened up; enclosed verandas re-opened, enlargement and enclosure of the southern verandas and creation of studio space, new windows, floor boards and entries
- 1978 – Dressing room and bathroom on the first floor adjacent to the kitchen
- 1992 – Wendy Whiteley commenced restoration of the adjoining RailCorp land into a garden
- 1999 – Ground floor studio made more accessible, reorganisation of the laundry and enlargement of the kitchen
- 2008 – Dormer window on southern roof plane, stairs are now replaced with a lift
- 2014 – North Sydney Council leases the land from RailCorp and names it "Wendy Whiteley's Secret Garden"

== Heritage listing ==
As at 4 October 2017, Brett Whiteley's House and Visual Curtilage, at 1 Walker Street, Lavender Bay is of state significance for its historic association with internationally and nationally acclaimed Australian artist Brett Whiteley AO. As well as being his family home and studio, the house, its setting and views inspired a substantial body of award-winning and influential works of art including paintings, works on paper and installations. The awards included two Archibald Prizes, three Wynne Prizes, and two Sir John Sulman Prizes, some of which were painted at Walker Street. The Walker Street house was personalised to create the Whiteley home and studio and provides physical evidence of the life and work of the late artist.

The house, its setting and the views is of state significance as the inspiration for the considerable body of Brett Whiteley's art undertaken here. The interiors and the setting/views are the subject of many of Whiteley's Lavender Bay works. The interior aspects and the exterior views/setting were often juxtaposed in his paintings expressing his creative genius and the significance of Lavender Bay as a subject. The house and its setting has social significance at a state level as the former home and studio of the artist Brett Whiteley, being regularly visited by art appreciation groups. Wendy Whiteley's garden on railway land has associational and social significance at the state level as a memorial place because the ashes of Brett Whiteley and Arkie Whiteley (their daughter) are buried there. The house with its harbour views reveal more information about Brett Whiteley's life and art, the genesis of his paintings and to assist in the ongoing discussion and assessment of his contribution to Australian art. As the place where he spent most of his artistic life in Australia, Brett Whiteley's house provides a rare insight into the workings of one of Australia's prominent artists.

Brett Whiteley House was listed on the New South Wales State Heritage Register on 23 March 2018 having satisfied the following criteria.

The place is important in demonstrating the course, or pattern, of cultural or natural history in New South Wales.

Brett Whiteley's house and visual curtilage at 1 Walker Street (house and studio) and its setting within parklands adjacent to Sydney Harbour is of state heritage significance for the outstanding body of work it inspired in one of Australia's finest artists during several decades of the mid-20th century. The place is particularly associated with a number of prize-winning paintings (Archibald, Sulman and Wynne) by Brett Whiteley during the 1970s. 1 Walker Street, together with the other four houses built in 1908 form a townscape row for developer and alderman Henry Green, are of local heritage significance as it interprets part of the form of the early beach head at Lavender Bay before the 1890s landfill and Clark Park adjacent to 1 Walker Street is also locally significant as it incorporates the 1866 public reserve that enveloped the early Lavender Bay beach head.

The place has a strong or special association with a person, or group of persons, of importance of cultural or natural history of New South Wales's history.

Brett Whiteley's house and visual curtilage is of state heritage significance for its historic association with nationally and internationally renowned Australian artist Brett Whiteley AO. The studio and home was an environment which provided inspiration that lead to award-winning and influential works of art. Whiteley was awarded two Archibald Prizes, three Wynne Prizes and two Sir John Sulman Prizes, including all three prizes in 1978-a feat that remains unique in Australian art history. Of these major works, most were painted at Walker Street and took in some aspect of the house interiors and/or its environs.

The place is important in demonstrating aesthetic characteristics and/or a high degree of creative or technical achievement in New South Wales.

Brett Whiteley's house and visual curtilage at 1 Walker Street is of state significance as the inspiration for the considerable body of work undertaken during Whiteley's "Lavender Bay phase". In his own words, he described Lavender Bay as... "my repeating theme - a subject I will always go back to until I die". The house and the immediate setting assists in the understanding of his creative output; the birds, the trees, the harbour and its icons. The house and its views over Lavender Bay are an important link to his most awarded and popular works.

The interiors and the contents of the house are the subject of many of Whiteley's Lavender Bay works. The interior aspects are often the foreground of the larger Lavender Bay landscapes or in some instances, the Lavender Bay landscape features subtly in the background of the rich internal spaces. The sitting room and studio at the lower level from where Brett Whiteley painted are interior spaces that demonstrate the achievements of Brett Whiteley. The interior arrangements reflect the current occupant's requirements and they do not necessarily reflect the particular arrangements featured in Whiteley's works. Minor modifications have been made to the interiors of the house, however, the space retains its integrity as the place where Whiteley lived and worked. The view from the house including railway land, parklands, Lavender Bay foreshore and the Lavender bay waters provided a rich palette for the paintings and artwork created by Brett Whiteley during his most productive "Lavender Bay phase". The house and setting and the views from the house are demonstrative of the inspiration it provided for the creative genius of Brett Whiteley.

The place has a strong or special association with a particular community or cultural group in New South Wales for social, cultural or spiritual reasons.

The house at 1 Walker Street has social significance at a state level as the former home and studio of artist Brett Whiteley, regularly visited by art appreciation groups and art appreciation tours are conducted for Art Society of NSW and Friends of the Whiteley Studio. Community consultation has not been undertaken to assess the social value associated with the house, however, it is highly likely that the house at No.1 Walker Street is valued for its association with Brett Whiteley by the art community and general public. Wendy Whiteley's unique "guerrilla" garden is gaining popularity and increased visitation contributing to a communal "sense of place". The locally significant garden, also functions as an important memorial space for the remains of Brett Whiteley and their daughter, Arkie Whiteley contributing further to a potential social value.

The place has potential to yield information that will contribute to an understanding of the cultural or natural history of New South Wales.

According to the New South Wale's Department of Climate Change, Energy, the Environment and Water, The Brett Whiteley House and Visual Curtilage inspired award winning artworks, including paintings such as Whitely's Lavender Bay series. Whitely's 1974 artwork "Lavender Bay," one of his most well-known paintings, as well as Big orange sunset (1974) and Self portait in the studio (1976), were painted from views within his home. In a statement of significance from the department, The Whitely House is noted for its research potential, and future study of the interior may reveal more details about Brett Whitely's life.

The place possesses uncommon, rare or endangered aspects of the cultural or natural history of New South Wales.

Brett Whiteley's house and visual curtilage at 1 Walker Street is of state heritage significance as the one place where he spent most of his artistic life in Australia. As the principal vantage point for virtually all of the celebrated Lavender Bay works, Brett Whiteley's house and visual curtilage is considered unique. Many of his most awarded paintings were undertaken at the house with the interiors and its waterscape and landscape environs featuring prominently in many of his major works.

== See also ==
- Australian residential architectural styles
