= Galloglass (disambiguation) =

Galloglass, or Gallowglass, were a type of Gaelic-Norse warrior.

Galloglass may also refer to:

- Gallowglass (novel), a novel by Barbara Vine
- Gallowglass (TV series), a miniseries based on the novel
- Galloglass, 1521 painting by Albrecht Dürer
