= Future Sex =

Future Sex may refer to:

- Future Sex (magazine), an erotic magazine published from 1992 to 1993
- Future Sex, a 2016 book by Emily Witt

== See also ==
- FutureSex/LoveSounds, a 2006 album by Justin Timberlake
  - "FutureSex/LoveSound", a 2006 song by Justin Timberlake
- FutureSex/LoveShow, a 2007 concert tour by Justin Timberlake
- Future Sex Drama, a 2012 album by Lunic
