= The Ten Commandments (miniseries) =

- Written by: Ron Hutchinson
- Directed by: Robert Dornhelm
- Starring: Dougray Scott; Naveen Andrews; Omar Sharif; Linus Roache; Paul Rhys
- Theme music composer: Randy Edelman
- Country of origin: United States
- Original language: English

Production
- Producers: Bernard Dudek; Robert Halmi Sr.; Paul Lowin
- Running time: 167 minutes
- Production companies: Actuality Productions; RHI Entertainment

Original release
- Network: ABC
- Release: April 10 – April 11, 2006

The Ten Commandments is a 2006 miniseries that dramatizes the Biblical story of Moses. It aired on ABC.

The series was filmed in Egypt, Mount Sinai, and the Sinai Peninsula.

== Plot ==
Moses's mother, Jochebed, saves her baby from the edict of the Pharaoh that all newborn male Hebrew children must die by placing him in a basket on the Nile River. He is found by Pharaoh's daughter Bithia and adopted into the royal house.

Some time later, Bithia gives birth to a son Menerith, and they are raised as brothers. Moses grows up knowing that he is not the blood brother of Menerith, but is shown his true heritage (something he knows nothing about) at about the age of 10: he is re-introduced to Jochebed, his father Amram, his brother Aaron, and his sister Miriam.

Years later, Prince Moses and Menerith inspect a building site. While Menerith leaves for a task, Moses continues his inspection only to witness an Egyptian overseer attempting to rape the wife of a Hebrew laborer. Moses manages to rescue the Hebrew couple by killing the Egyptian overseer and hiding the body. When the body is discovered, Pharaoh orders Moses' arrest, but he is able to escape with the aid of Menerith.

After traveling days through the desert, Moses arrives in Midian and saves the seven daughters of Jethro from tribesmen. In gratitude, their father gives Moses the choice of one of them to take for his wife. He refuses but is later convinced by Zipporah to marry her.

Moses, still wanting to know why God allows the Hebrews to be enslaved, climbs Mount Sinai (Mount Horeb) and is confronted by God in the form of a bush that burns but is not consumed. God tells Moses that "I am who I am", gives Moses his powers, and endows him with the knowledge to free the Hebrews.

Because Pharaoh Ramesses refuses to free the Hebrews, Egypt is struck with ten plagues. Only after the final one, during which Pharaoh's beloved son dies, are the Hebrews freed. However, Pharaoh's heart is hardened once more due to him being unable to accept his son's death, and decides to try to re-capture them.

The Hebrews are guided to the Red Sea by a cloud. When the Egyptians' chariots get near, God blocks their path and Moses parts the Red Sea, providing the Hebrews an escape route. When the Hebrews make it to the other side, Moses closes the separated waters, drowning the pursuing Egyptians — including Menerith. The Hebrews witness Moses weeping over Menerith, whom he later gives a proper burial.

Moses climbs the mountain to receive God's commandments in the form of two stone tablets, but when he descends, he finds that many of the Hebrews have built a golden calf and created an orgy. Moses destroys the tablets and the idol in a fit of rage and orders the deaths of the wicked revelers. After a brutal fight that leaves many dead, the survivors plead to receive God's commandments and Moses climbs up the mountain again. After Moses reads the commandments, the tablets are placed in an ark.

Sometime later, an elderly Moses lives his life as a hermit on a mountain slope and is seen looking at the promised land, which he is not allowed to enter due to an unspecified previous disobedience to God.

== Cast ==
- Dougray Scott as Moses
- Linus Roache as Aaron
- Naveen Andrews as Menerith
- Mía Maestro as Zipporah
- Paul Rhys as Ramses
- Richard O'Brien as Anander
- Silas Carson as Jered
- Padma Lakshmi as Princess Bithia
- Susan Lynch as Miriam
- Claire Bloom as Rani
- Omar Sharif as Jethro

== Reception ==
Barry Garron of The Hollywood Reporter gave the mini-series generally positive review, praising the performances as well as "the stunning cinematography and eye-catching special effects" but also noted that it "fails to take full advantage of the source material". David Bianculli of the New York Daily News reviewed it as "Thou shalt not watch", while Matt Roush of TV Guide wrote the film "violates the primary commandment of epic filmmaking, Biblical or otherwise: Thou shalt not bore". Matthew Gilbert of the Boston Globe called it "an empty inane remake" and The Washington Post's Tom Shales calls it a "dreadful, doleful remake of Cecil B. DeMille's 1956 classic The Ten Commandments".
