= Tom Polo =

Australian artist

Tom Polo (born 1985) is an Australian artist based in Sydney, New South Wales. His work has been exhibited in group and solo exhibitions in several capital cities of Australia as well as in London, England.

He holds a Bachelor of Fine Arts (Hons) and Master of Fine Arts from the UNSW College of Fine Arts.

== Awards and residencies ==
Polo was the inaugural recipient of the Parramatta Artists' Studios residency in 2007, and continued to work there until 2014. Other awards and residencies include:

- 2011: Art & Australia / Credit Suisse Private Banking Contemporary Art Award
- 2014: Redlands Konica Minolta Emerging Art Prize
- 2015: Brett Whiteley Travelling Art Scholarship
- 2015: Parramatta City Council Creative Fellowship
- 2016: Residency at the Cité internationale des arts, Paris
- 2016: Associate Artist Residency with Acme Studios, London
- 2017: Finalist, Sir John Sulman Prize
- 2018: His portrait of artist Joan Ross, entitled I once thought I'd do anything for you (Joan), was a finalist in the Archibald Prize.
- 2025: Finalist, Ramsay Art Prize

== Selected exhibitions ==
His work has been represented in many exhibitions, including:

- The National 2021: New Australian Art
- The 2022 Adelaide Biennial
