= Acme Studios =

Charity based in London

Acme, also styled ACME, is a charity based in London, England which provides affordable studio and living space, residencies and awards for visual artists. Its studios are known as Acme Studios. It formerly provided two gallery spaces, first the Acme Gallery and later the Acme Project Space.

== History ==
Acme was founded in 1972 by Jonathan Harvey and David Panton, who both received an OBE for services to the arts in 2014. Harvey and Panton led a group of London graduates, finding at that time there were empty factories, warehouses and other properties available to provide cheap spaces for artists to work and live in, albeit temporarily.

=== The Acme Gallery ===
From 1976 to 1981 Acme ran The Acme Gallery, a contemporary art space and former disused banana warehouse in Covent Garden. The gallery focused on showcasing installation and performance art which was difficult to exhibit elsewhere, and between 1976 and 1981 featured artists such as Stephen Cripps, Jock McFadyen, Helen Chadwick, Stuart Brisley and Frank Bowling. Alongside Camden Arts Centre, The Acme Gallery was one of the venues to host the New Contemporaries Live Show.

=== Acme Project Space ===
From June 2009 to December 2015, the Acme Project Space provided both UK-based and international artists on Acme's Residencies & Awards programme with a project and exhibition space, to show new work and engage in a critical dialogue with a wider audience. The Project Space featured artists such as David Blandy, Vishwa Shroff, Luke McCreadie, Clare Price, and Marianna Simnett. (The space is now the home of Auto Italia South East.)

== Today ==
Acme provides studio and living space, residencies and awards for visual artists.

As of 2022 Acme supports 800 artists with affordable studio space across 15 sites in Greater London (within Bethnal Green, Bow, Deptford, Elephant & Castle, Homerton, Kensal Green, Peckham, Poplar, Stockwell, Stratford, as well as Carshalton and Purfleet). It also provides space for Auto Italia South East, East London Printmakers, Kinetika, Fieldnotes, and the Central Saint Martins Associate Studio Programme.

== Residencies and awards ==
As well as artist studio provision, Acme also offers artist support, and hundreds of artists have benefited from its programme since 1982. In 2014, Australian artist Tom Polo took up an associate artist residency with Acme.

Acme runs a number of residencies and awards in collaboration with partners, including Slade School of Fine Art, Goldsmiths, University of London, Australia Council for the Arts, Conseil des arts et des lettres du Québec, and Khazanah Nasional, catered for emerging Malaysian artists. The Khazanah Nasional Associate Artist Residency Programme (KAAR) has invited renowned industry professionals such as Vanessa Murrell to help develop and prepare young artists for the next growth phase in their professional careers. The programme also includes Acme's five-year Fire Station Residency, established in 1997, whose previous recipients include Martin Creed, Lindsay Seers, Erika Tan, Haroon Mirza, Jonathan Baldock, Samson Kambalu, George Charman and Noel Paine.

== Publications ==
- Studios for Artists: Concepts and Concrete, ed. Jonathan Harvey, Graham Ellard, 2015. (ISBN 978-1910433089)
- 72-82, William Raban, 2015. (co-published by LUX)
- "Are we there yet?" Duncan Pickstock, Paintings 2014-2015 at The Acme Project Space, text by Paul O’Kane, 2015. (ISBN 978-0-9566739-8-5)
- I Killed a Viper, Clare Price, text by Keran James, 2014. (ISBN 978-0-9566739-7-8)
- The Fire Station Project, Acme Studios' Work/Live Residency Programme, 1997-2013, ed. Jonathan Harvey, Julia Lancaster, 2013. (ISBN 978-0-9566739-5-4)
- Time and Vision, Australia Council for the Arts London Residencies Hosted by Acme Studios, 1992–2012, 2012. (ISBN 978-0-9566739-3-0)
- Roger Kite, Pathways, 2012. (ISBN 978-0-9566739-4-7)
- 25 Years – Hosting International Artists’ Residencies in London, 2012. (ISBN 978-0-9566739-2-3)
