= Mitch Cairns =

Australian artist

Mitch Cairns (born 1984) is an Australian painter. In 2017, he won the Archibald Prize. His work has been collected by many prominent Australian institutions.

== Life and career ==
Cairns was born in the Sydney suburb of Camden and grew up in Casula and later Wollongong. He studied at the National Art School during which time he worked as a labourer for his father, a bricklayer.

Cairns won the Brett Whiteley Travelling Art Scholarship in 2012. With the scholarship, Cairns undertook a residency in Paris. In 2017, Cairns won the Archibald Prize for his painting Agatha Gothe-Snape. Former Archibald winner John Olsen criticised the decision to award the prize to Cairns, describing it as "the worst decision I've ever seen." The decision was defended by artist and prize judge Ben Quilty who praised Cairns and the portrait.

Cairns is married to fellow artist Agatha Gothe-Snape with whom he has a son.

== Work ==
Cairns' work has been noted for its geometric character and bold colours. New Zealand artist Tom Kreisler is among his influences.
