= Kaitee Page =

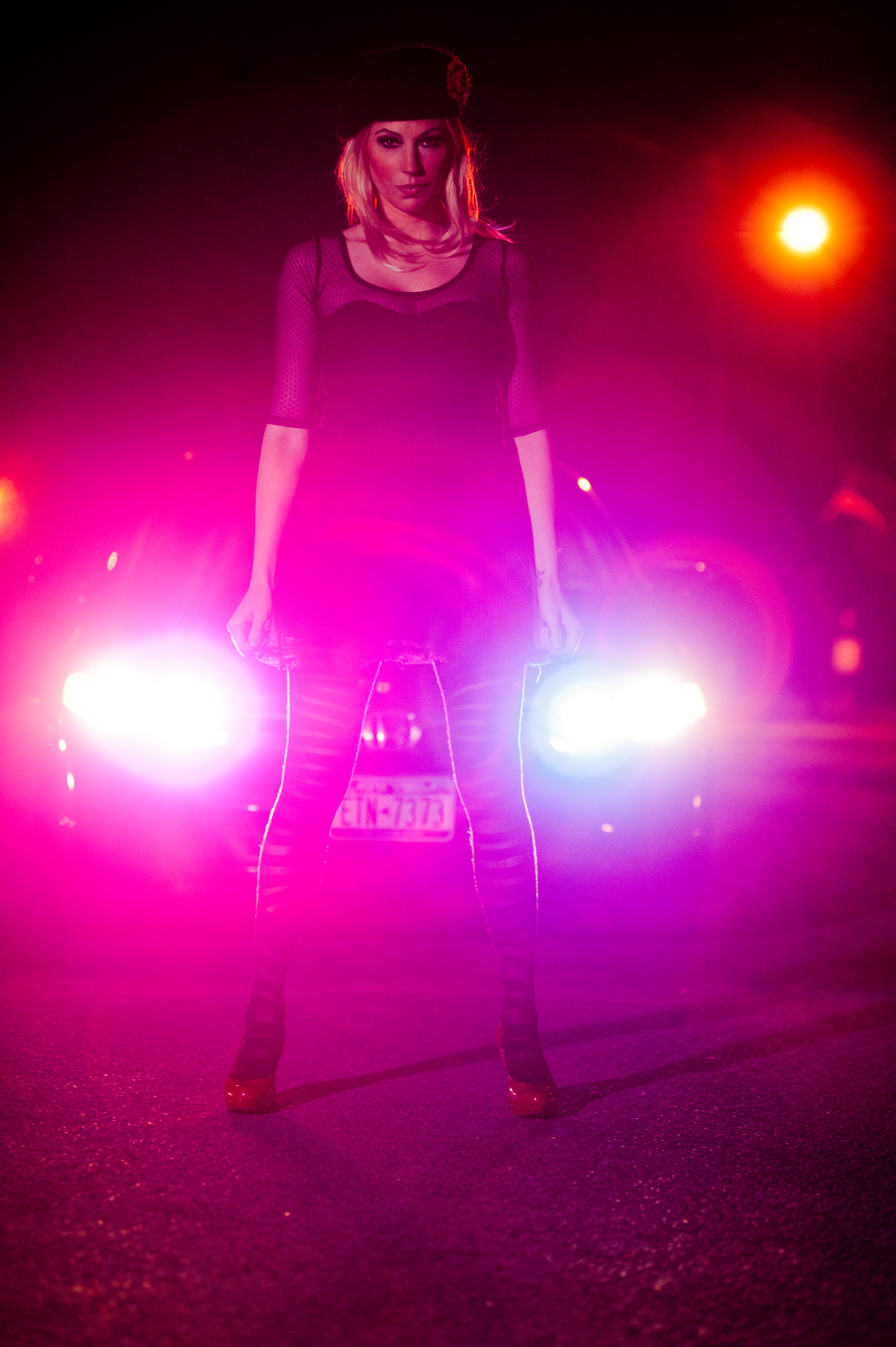

Background information
- Born: Kaitee Page
- Origin: New York City; currently Nashville, Tennessee
- Genres: Indie rock, electropop
- Instruments: vocals, guitar, keyboards, viola, violin, piano, bass, electronic drums
- Years active: 2005–present
- Website: kaiteepage.com

Kaitee Page, formerly known as Lunic, is a songwriter, singer, electronic musician, and multi-instrumentalist . A classically trained violist and violinist, Page fuses contemporary and classical instrumentation with electronic music. Originally from New York, Page is currently based in Guanacaste, Costa Rica.

In March 2008 Lunic became the third UK artist (17th artist worldwide) to raise $50,000 on European crowd-sourcing website Sellaband. Page used the money to record Lunic's second full-length album, Lovethief, in NY with producer Peter Denenberg and mastering engineer Ted Jensen. Lovethief was released May 14, 2009, and Lunic was subsequently interviewed by Good Morning America and the New York Times regarding fan-funded albums.

Page has played hundreds of shows throughout the United States, United Kingdom, Canada, & Italy Her live performance has been described as, "a psychedelic display of lyric poetry in the form of an understated, powerful show." In 2012, Lunic opened for Lights at Envol et-Macadam in Quebec City, Canada, Moby at Larkfest in Albany, NY, Youngblood Hawke in Clifton Park, NY Mindless Self Indulgence in Albany, NY, Company of Thieves at Revolution Hall in Troy, NY, Public Image Ltd. in Albany, NY, as well as Creed at the Saratoga Performing Arts Center.

== Beginning and formation ==
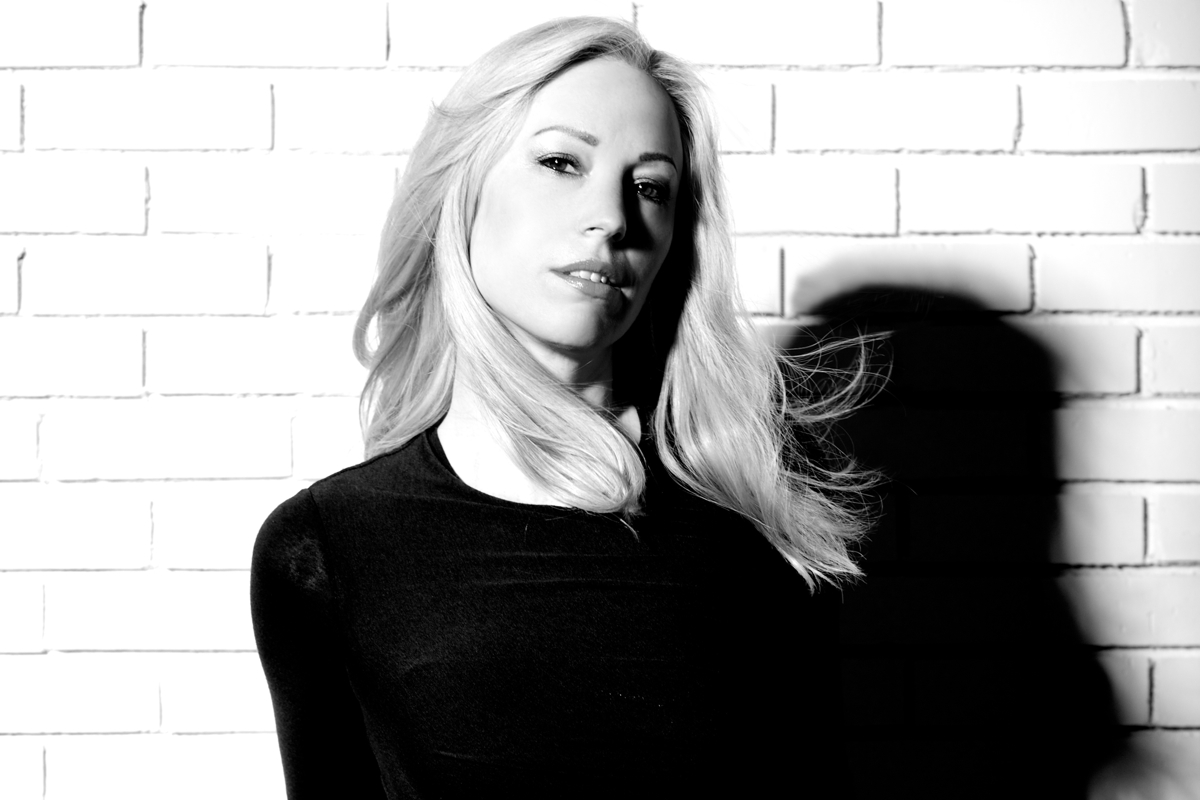
Lunic Official Photo 2014

Kaitee Page was born in upstate New York, attended Vanderbilt University in Nashville, TN and moved to Los Angeles in 2003. Her experience as a performer began as an electric violinist and keyboard player in various LA-based pop/rock bands, most notably the Australian pop rock band Porcelain signed to Universal Records. Page also studied acting at Playhouse West School & Repertory Theater while living in Los Angeles and has appeared in various short films, commercials, & plays.

Page began writing songs in 2005 after seeing the alt. rock band Muse perform live at Coachella Music Festival while simultaneously residing in Los Angeles and Las Vegas. In 2006, Page left Porcelain amicably to pursue a songwriting career. In 2007 she relocated to London, and spent the next 7 years touring, traveling the world, writing new music, and studying Spanish, French, & German. Much of the inspiration for her writing is derived from her travels. To date, she has visited 25 countries.

Page coined the band name Lunic in early 2006 while visiting London. Inspiration was derived from the fact that the word "lunic" did not exist in any language, except when written with specific accents; l'únic (Catalan) and lúnic (Galician) both translate to English as "the only" or "the one." Similarly, the Spanish and French words for "moon" are luna and lune. Thus, the word "lunic" evokes mystery as well as images of the moon, space, femininity, uniqueness, individuality, lunacy, and all things cyclical.

In 2009 Page returned to upstate NY to take care of her ailing father after he suffered a massive stroke. A year later, she relocated to Manhattan.

In 2013, Page moved to Dallas, TX to begin writing/recording her fourth studio album.

== Style ==
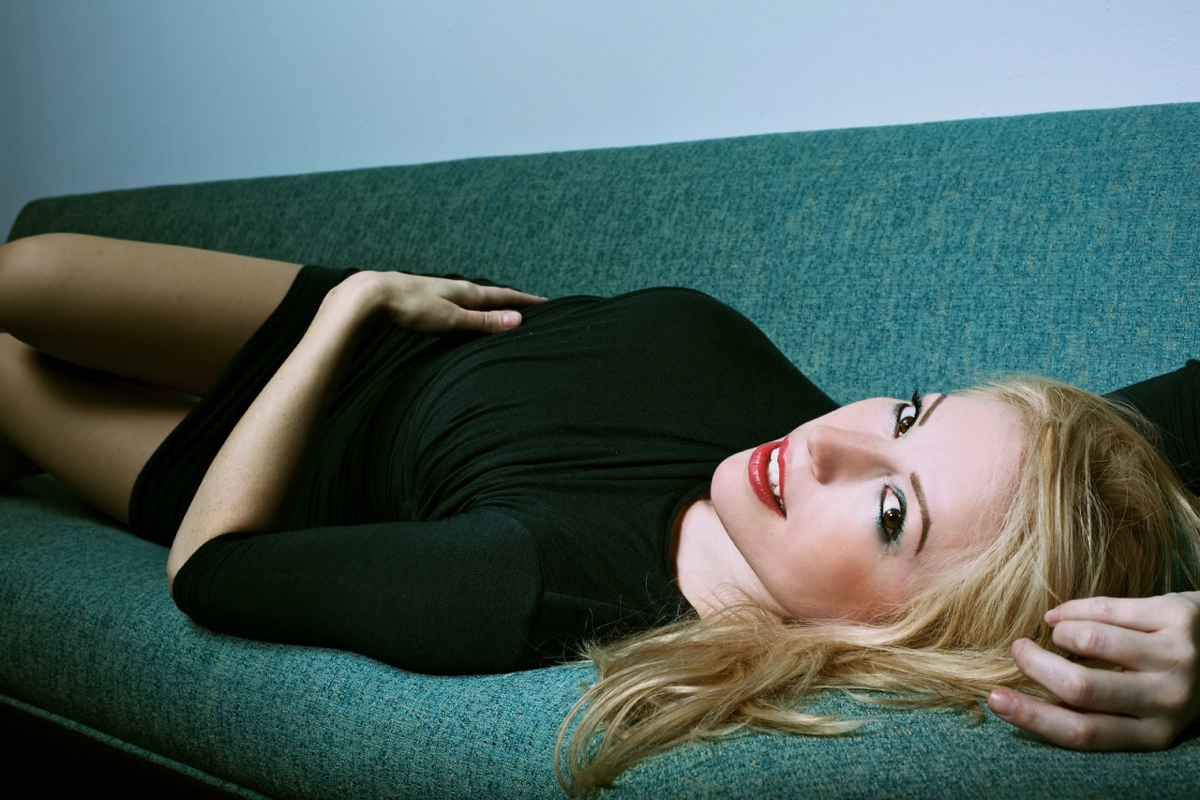
Lunic Music 2014

Lunic's first release, in 2006, was a collection of piano-based alternative songs called The Uglylights (demos), written & recorded in California, followed quickly by the EP Splinter, recorded in London in just 3 days. They were followed up in 2009 by Lunic's first fan-funded album titled Lovethief written & recorded in upstate NY. In 2012, she released Future Sex Drama, a full-length written & recorded in Germany & New York City, originally described as "sultry, ethereal synthpop" by Lunic herself. She has also released 6 digital singles on iTunes throughout the years.

On Future Sex Drama, Lunic begins taking her first steps as co-producer alongside Peter Denenberg, bringing together the experimentation behind her early work and a cutting edge pop aesthetic.

Each album tackles a different set of influences and styles. Lunic is known for dabbling in different genres. Her newest album, Future Sex Drama, incorporates influences as wide as The xx, Ladytron, Metric, and Placebo drawing from genres like electropop, new wave, synthpop, darkwave, alternative, and art-rock. This approach has allowed the project to remain flexible and evolving.

For live performances, Lunic regularly performs with various accompanying musicians, usually including a drummer.

Lunic's recent work has been compared to The xx and Portishead, "Lunic make(s) distinctive and sultry psychedelic indie with hints of downbeat British electronica acts The xx and Portishead, mournful dashes of violin and melodic lead guitar flourishes." -NXNE She describes her work as "a sensual, cathartic escape." CMJ called her work "Glossy enough for the dance floor but retaining that sinister edge."

== Discography ==
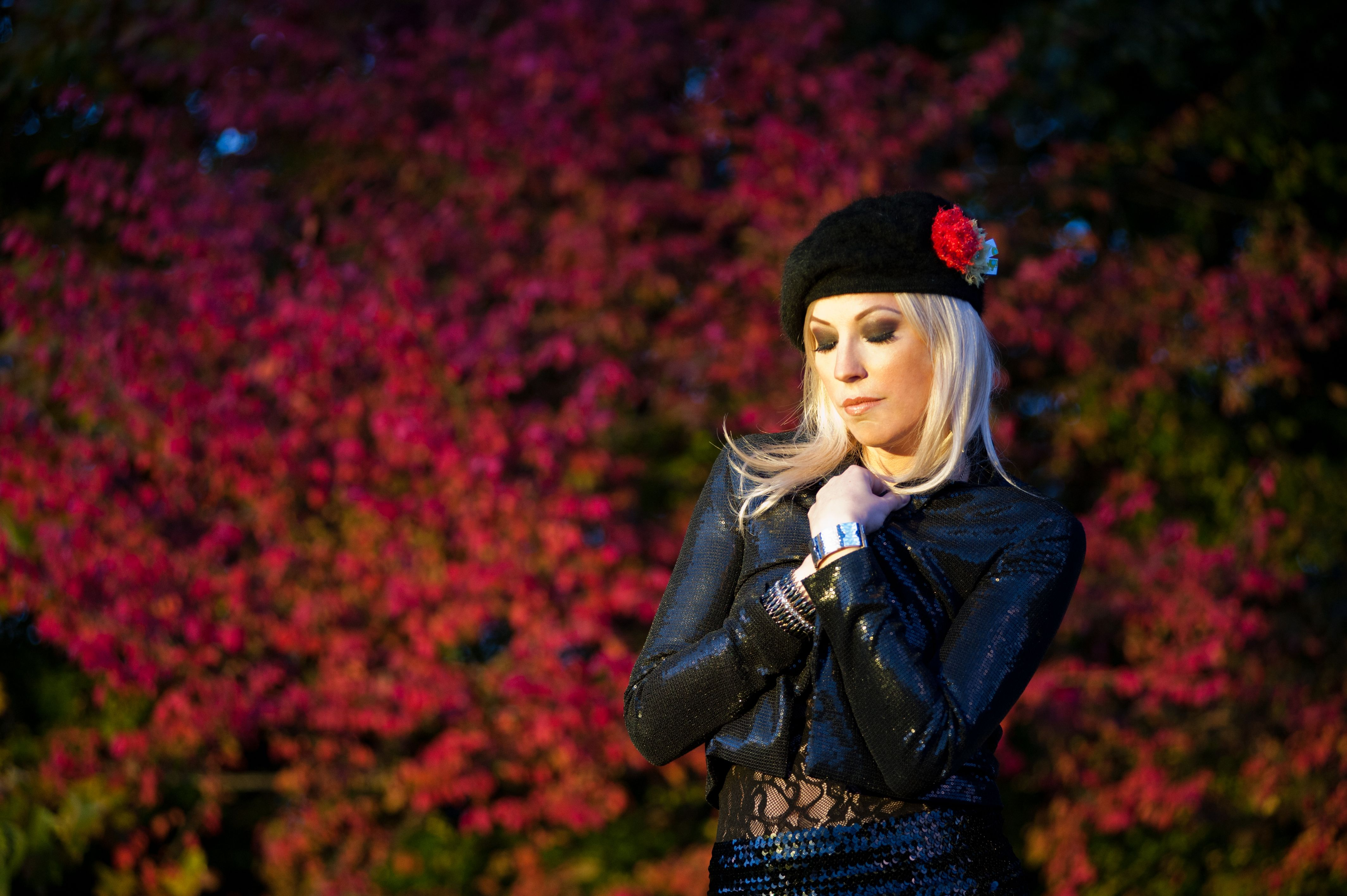
Lunic Official Band Phot 2012

=== Albums ===
- The Uglylights (demos), 2006 Audio Virus X Studio City, CA
- Skeletons, 2008 Audio Virus X Studio City, CA
- Lovethief, 2009 Acme Studios Mamaroneck, NY
- Future Sex Drama, 2012 Acme Studios Mamaroneck, NY

=== EPs ===
- Splinter, 2008 Livingston Recording Studios London, UK

=== Singles ===
- "Beautiful" 2007 Monkey-Man Studios Thousand Oaks, CA
- "Dichotomy" 2007 Monkey-Man Studios Thousand Oaks, CA
- "Magic Love-Hate Thing" 2010 Acme Studios Mamaroneck, NY
- "Oh No Yoko!" 2010 Acme Studios Mamaroneck, NY
- "Far Away (Radio Edit)" 2015 Acme Studios Mamaroneck, NY
- "The Dark House (Elliot Tribal Remix)" 2015 Acme Studios Mamaroneck, NY
- "What Day is it Today" 2021 Topetitud Studios Mexico City, MX
- "Famous" 2021 Topetitud Studios Mexico City, MX
- "New Day" 2025 Nocny Studios Nashville, TN

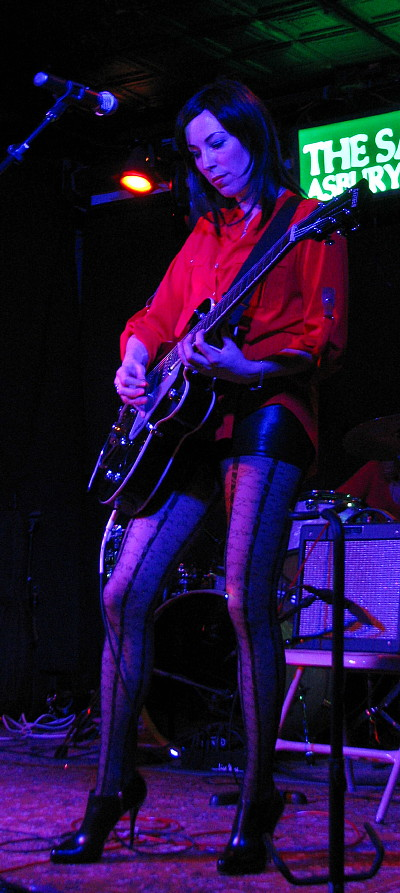
Kaitee Page of Lunic on stage at The Saint in Asbury Park, NJ, April 2012

== Songwriting awards ==
- 2009 WGY-FM/Channel 103.1's Most Original Band Contest: Top 6 Finalist
- 2009 Mike Pinder's Songwars Songwriting Competition: Finalist "Him"
- 2009 Gina for Missing Persons Songwriter Contest: Finalist "Him"
- 2009 LA Music Awards: Rock Single of the Year Nomination "Him"
- 2009 John Lennon Songwriting Contest: Top 3 Finalist in Rock Category – Him
- 2010 Great Lakes Songwriting Contest: Honorable Mention "Oh No Yoko!"
- 2010 SongCircle Songwriter Awards: Honorable Mention "Oh No Yoko!"
- 2011 Elfenworks Social Justice Award: Runner Up "Hope (Nothing Left to Lose)"
- 2011 John Lennon Songwriting Contest: Top 3 Finalist in Electronic Category – "Hope (Nothing Left to Lose)"
- 2012 Eco Arts Awards: Songs of Freedom Finalist – "War"
- 2012 PlanetRox Competition: 1st place Winner United States – "Moving On"
- 2013 John Lennon Songwriting Contest: Grand Prize Winner in Electronic Category – "War"
- 2014 International Songwriting Competition: Semi-finalist in Rock Category – "Magic Love-Hate Thing"
