= Love Lies Bleeding (1999 film) =

- Directed by: William Tannen
- Written by: Tony Rush
- Produced by: Wally Lake; Ricardo Freixa
- Starring: Paul Rhys; Emily Raymond; Faye Dunaway; Malcolm McDowell
- Cinematography: Vladimír Smutný
- Edited by: Peter Cohen
- Music by: Michal Dvorák
- Production company: Village Roadshow Pictures
- Distributed by: Warner Bros.
- Release date: June 23, 1999
- Running time: 90 minutes
- Countries: United States; Australia
- Language: English

Love Lies Bleeding is a 1999 drama film directed by William Tannen.

== Plot summary ==
Jack the Ripper terrorizes London in 1888. The young talented journalist Catherine Winwood (Emily Raymound) begins her first job. The relationship between Catherine and the surgeon Jonathan Stevens (Paul Rhys) threatens to shatter, as her fiancé may be involved in the gruesome murders of young prostitutes in the Whitechapel district. But Inspector Frederick Abberline (Wayne Rogers) arrests another suspected surgeon ...

== Cast ==
- Paul Rhys as Jonathan
- Emily Raymond as Catherine Winwood
- Malcolm McDowell as Malcolm Mead
- Wayne Rogers as Inspector Abberline
- Faye Dunaway as Josephine Butler
- Noel le Bon as Emmett-Lloyd
- John Comer as Constable Neal

rest of cast listed alphabetically

- Peter Alton as Drunken Sailor
- Kevin Barron as Bunter
- Alice Bendová as Elisabeth Stride (as Alice Veselá)
- Nancy Bishop as Polly
- Paul Bowers as Photographer
- Colleen Case as Passer By
- Michael Cella as Barkeeper
- Barbara Day as Charlotte
- Christian Dunckley Clark as Masonry Worker
- David Fisher as Coroner Baxter
- Monika Foris Kvasnicková as Madam (as Monika Kvasnicková)
- Simon Francis as Stead
- Simon French as Brown
- Tim Gosling as Bobby 1
- Michaela Hans as Annie Chapman
- Vashti Hughes as Tart
- Janet Lynch as Trudy
- Hugh McGahan as Prof. Coweling
- Caroline Medows as Maggie
- Andrea Miltner as Mary Kelly (as Andrea Miltnerova)
- Frank Navratil as Intern 2
- Jan Nemejovský as Monroe
- David Nykl as Fraser
- Robert Orr as George Lusk
- Rudolf Pellar as Thornton
- Jakob Schwarz as Bremner
- Robert Seymour as McKenzie
- Kate Simpson as Mrs. Cooper
- Bruce Solomon as Intern 1
- Elin Spidlová as Kathy Eddows
- Gordon Stone as Quinn
- Nick Stuart as Cross
- Pavel Vokoun as Shoemaker Pizer
- Collin Williams as Crowd Member
- Garry Wright as Clerk
- Jennifer Yeager as Nurse Ellis
- Laura Zam as Demonstrator

== Production ==
Love Lies Bleeding was the last small budget film produced by the Village Roadshow Pictures before it was bought out by Warner Brothers. The script was written by Tony Rush, Richard Rush's son, and was co-produced by Wally Lake and Ricardo Freixa. The film was an Australian–American co-production.

== Home media ==
The film was released on DVD in 2000.
