= Paul Rhys =

Welsh actor

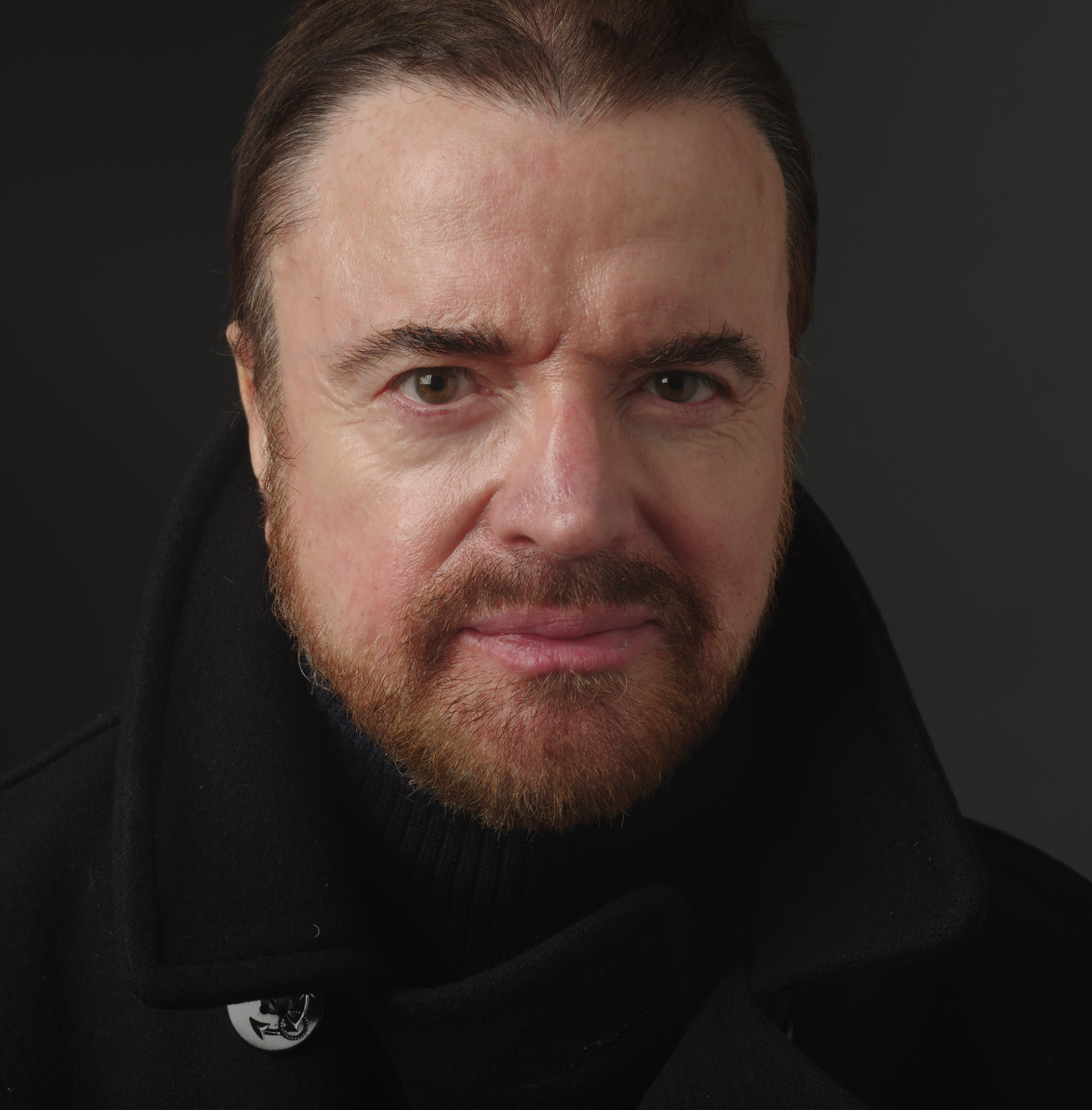
- Born: 19 December 1963 (age 62); Neath, Wales, United Kingdom
- Education: Royal Academy of Dramatic Art
- Occupation: Actor
- Years active: 1986 – present

Paul Rhys (born 19 December 1963) is a Welsh actor with an extensive career in theatre, radio, television and film.

== Early life ==
Rhys was born in Neath to working-class Catholic parents, Kathryn Ivory and Richard Charles Rhys, a labourer. He is of part-Irish descent on his mother's side. From the age of ten, he bred and trained horses, becoming a highly accomplished rider. A committed punk during his youth, Rhys sang in several bands.

== Career ==
Rhys received a Bernard Shaw Scholarship to study at RADA. In the first term he was spotted by Philip Prowse and was invited to perform in Oscar Wilde's A Woman of No Importance at the Glasgow Citizens Theatre, playing the illegitimate son, Gerald. He also appeared as Dean Swift in Julien Temple's film Absolute Beginners (1986). Rhys completed his education at RADA by winning the William Pole prize and the Bancroft Gold Medal.

=== Film ===
His next film role was in Franklin J. Schaffner's Lionheart. After a brief spell at the Royal Shakespeare Company he played opposite Colin Firth in Richard Eyre's award-winning film Tumbledown. Soon after this, he appeared in Vincent & Theo, directed by American film director Robert Altman, as Vincent van Gogh's younger brother Theo van Gogh. Continuing the theme of famous brothers, Paul then played Sydney Chaplin opposite Robert Downey Jr.'s Charlie Chaplin in Richard Attenborough's Chaplin. He went on to play Massis in Alan Bennett's 102 Boulevard Haussmann. He then appeared opposite Peter O'Toole in Rebecca's Daughters. A series of films then followed including From Hell, Food of Love, Love Lies Bleeding, Becoming Colette and Hellraiser: Deader. He appears as Talleyrand in Ridley Scott's 2023 epic Napoleon, and as Duncan in Emerald Fennell's Saltburn.

=== Television ===
Running parallel to Rhys's film work has been a diverse and notable television career, working in leading roles with directors such as Mike Hodges, Stephen Frears, Sir Richard Eyre, Philip Martin, Christopher Morahan, Tom Vaughan, Edward Hall, Harry Bradbeer in productions including Tumbledown, A Dance to the Music of Time, The Heroes, Ghosts, Gallowglass, The Healer, Anna Karenina, The Deal, Beethoven, The Ten Commandments, Borgia, Luther and Spooks.

In 2008 Rhys appeared in the series Agatha Christie's Poirot. In 2014, he played the lead as traitor Aldrich Ames, in The Assets miniseries, then as King George III in Turn: Washington's Spies and as Sir John Conroy in Victoria. He has made a minor industry out of playing vampires: Being Human (as Ivan); as Vlad, the Prince of Wallachia aka Dracula in seasons 1–3 of the 2015 series Da Vinci's Demons; and as Andrew Hubbard in two seasons of the 2020–2021 hit, A Discovery of Witches. In 2023, he appears as Tommy in the BBC film, Men Up.

In 2026 Rhys appeared in Russell T Davies’s Channel 4 drama Tip Toe.

=== Theatre ===
Rhys's early stage work included performances at Glasgow Citizens Theatre, Royal Shakespeare Company, Riverside Studios, Compass Theatre and Young Vic. His first appearance at the Royal National Theatre was opposite Ian McKellen in Bent, subsequently playing Angelo in Simon McBurney's Measure for Measure for which he won the Critics' Circle Theatre Award; Housman in The Invention of Love; and Edgar in King Lear, for which he was nominated for an Olivier Award. He appeared as Edmund in Long Day's Journey into Night and as Leo in Design for Living at The Donmar Warehouse, performing opposite Rachel Weisz and Clive Owen. In 2000 he played the title role in Hamlet at the Young Vic and later in Tokyo and Osaka. He received several awards for this performance. Rhys continued his collaboration with Simon McBurney in Vanishing Points and The Dark is Rising, and played The Master in Master and Margarita. The show opened at the Barbican in 2010 and continued on international tour, returning to the Barbican for a second sell-out season in 2012. In 2016, he starred in a new version of Chekhov's Uncle Vanya by Robert Icke at The Almeida Theatre alongside Tobias Menzies, Jessica Brown Findlay and Vanessa Kirby.

Real-life characters played by Rhys have included Vlad Tepes, Ludwig van Beethoven, Peter Mandelson, Paul McCartney, Thomas De Quincey, A. E. Housman, Frédéric Chopin, Marcus Tullius Cicero and Talleyrand.

On two occasions, Rhys was taken to hospital while working on a stage production, once with pneumonia and, on the other occasion, with exhaustion. In the title role in Howard Brenton's play Paul at the Royal National Theatre, he was unable to continue as he had lost an unhealthy amount of weight, dropping from 76 to 57 kilograms (168 to 126 lb).

=== Radio ===
Rhys has acted in over one hundred BBC Radio dramas. His roles include: Simon Templar in Leslie Charteris's The Saint (1995), Prince Myshkin in Fyodor Dostoevsky's The Idiot (2002), Charles Lamb in Carlo Gébler's Charles and Mary (2011), and Jacques Futrelle's Augustus S. F. X. Van Dusen in The Rivals (2011–2013).

== Personal life ==
Rhys was in a relationship with the late Australian actress Arkie Whiteley, with whom he appeared in Gallowglass. When Whiteley received a diagnosis of terminal cancer at the age of 36, he nursed her until her death.

Rhys is queer.

== Filmography ==
=== Film ===
| Year | Title | Role | Notes |
|---|---|---|---|
| 1986 | Absolute Beginners | Dean Swift | |
| 1987 | Lionheart | Mayor of the Underground City | |
| 1987 | Little Dorrit | Charles Stiltstalking | |
| 1989 | Spirit | Douglas Rimmer | |
| 1990 | Vincent & Theo | Theo van Gogh | |
| 1991 | Becoming Colette | Chapo | |
| 1992 | Rebecca's Daughters | Anthony Raine | |
| 1992 | Chaplin | Sydney Chaplin | |
| 1995 | Nina Takes a Lover | Photographer | |
| 1999 | Love Lies Bleeding | Dr. Jonathan Stephens | |
| 1999 | The Strange Case of Delphina Potocka or The Mystery of Chopin | Frédéric Chopin | |
| 2001 | From Hell | Dr. Ferral | |
| 2002 | Food of Love | Richard Kennington | |
| 2003 | Vacuum | Adam | Short film |
| 2003 | Y Mabinogi | Lord Pwyll | Voice |
| 2003 | The Deal | Peter Mandelson | |
| 2005 | Hellraiser: Deader | Winter | Direct-to-video |
| 2007 | Unknown Things | Hoogstraten | |
| 2011 | Eliminate: Archie Cookson | Archie Cookson | BIFFF Thriller Prize – Special Mention |
| 2023 | Napoleon | Talleyrand | |
| 2023 | Saltburn | Duncan | |
| 2023 | Widow Clicquot | Droite | |
| 2026 | Wuthering Heights | Heathcliff's father | |

=== Television ===
| Year | Title | Role | Notes |
|---|---|---|---|
| 1987 | My Family and Other Animals | George | |
| 1988 | Tumbledown | Hugh MacKessac | Television film |
| 1988 | The Heroes | Ivan Lyon | |
| 1990 | Screen Two | Amable Massis | Series 7, episode 5: "102 Boulevard Haussmann" |
| 1990 | Opium Eaters | Thomas De Quincey | Television film |
| 1992 | Chillers | Adam Marshall | Series 1, episode 9: "A Bird Poised to Fly" |
| 1993 | Gallowglass | Sandor | |
| 1994 | The Healer | Dr. John Lassiter | Television film; BAFTA Cymru Award for Best Actor |
| 1994 | A Summer's Day Dream | Christopher | Television film |
| 1995 | Ghosts | Captain Peter Buckle | Series 1, episode 2: "Blood and Water" |
| 1995 | The Haunting of Helen Walker | Edward Goffe | Television film |
| 1996 | Kavanagh QC | Sam Wicks | Series 2, episode 6: "Job Satisfaction" |
| 1997 | A Dance to the Music of Time | Charles Stringham | |
| 1998 | Performance | Edgar | King Lear |
| 2000 | Randall & Hopkirk (Deceased) | Douglas Milton | Series 1, episode 4: "Paranoia" |
| 2000 | I Saw You | Ben Walters | Television film |
| 2000 | Anna Karenina | Nikolai | |
| 2001 | The Innocent | David Pastorov | Television film |
| 2001 | The Cazalets | Rupert Cazalet | |
| 2002 | I Saw You | Ben Walters | |
| 2002 | The Lives of Animals | John | Television film |
| 2003 | Murder in Mind | Matthew Hopkins | Series 3, episode 1: "Echoes" |
| 2005 | Timewatch | Cicero | Episode: "Murder in Rome" |
| 2005 | Beethoven | Ludwig van Beethoven | |
| 2006 | The Ten Commandments | Ramesses II | |
| 2008 | Bonekickers | Edward Laygass | Series 1, episode 1: "Army of God" |
| 2008 | Agatha Christie's Poirot | Robin Upward | Series 11, episode 1: "Mrs McGinty's Dead" |
| 2008 | Spooks | Alexis Meynell | Series 7, episode 5 |
| 2009 | The Queen | Prince Charles | Series 1, episode 4: "The Enemy Within" |
| 2010 | Being Human | Ivan | 5 episodes |
| 2010 | Luther | Lucien Burgess | Series 1, episode 3 |
| 2010 | New Tricks | Sebastian Carter | Series 7, episode 1: "Dead Man Talking" |
| 2010 | When Harvey Met Bob | Paul McCartney | Television film |
| 2010 | Agatha Christie's Marple | Lewis Pritchard | Series 5, episode 3: "The Blue Geranium" |
| 2011 | Murdoch Mysteries | Dr. Llewellyn Francis | 3 episodes |
| 2011 | Moving On | Andy | Series 3, episode 4: "Donor" |
| 2011 | Great Expectations | Compeyson/Denby | |
| 2013–14 | Borgia | Leonardo da Vinci | 6 episodes |
| 2013–15 | Da Vinci's Demons | Vlad the Impaler | 4 episodes |
| 2014 | The Assets | Aldrich Ames | |
| 2015–17 | Turn | George III | 3 episodes |
| 2015 | Casanova | Count of St. Germain | Television film |
| 2016 | Victoria | Sir John Conroy | 3 episodes |
| 2017 | Rellik | Patrick Barker | 3 episodes |
| 2018 | Lore | Philip Smith | Series 2, episode 5: "Mary Webster: The Witch of Hadley" |
| 2021 | A Discovery of Witches | Andrew Hubbard | Series 2, 3 |
| 2023 | Men Up | Tommy Cadogan | Television film |
| 2025 | The Sandman | Hippogriff (voice) | Episode: "Long Live the King" |
| 2026 | Tip Toe | Melba | Miniseries |

=== Theatre ===
| Year | Title | Role | Notes |
|---|---|---|---|
| 1983 | Bouncers | Ralph | Yorkshire Actors |
| 1984 | A Woman of No Importance | Gerald Arbuthnot | Glasgow Citizens Theatre |
| 1985 | La Vie parisienne | Milord | Glasgow Citizens Theatre |
| 1986 | The Orphan | Polydore | Greenwich Theatre |
| 1986 | The Merchant of Venice | Lorenzo | Royal Shakespeare Company |
| 1986 | Much Ado About Nothing | Claudio | Royal Shakespeare Company |
| 1987 | Ghetto | Solomon | Riverside Studios |
| 1988 | The Government Inspector | Khlestakov | Compass Theatre |
| 1990 | Bent | Rudy | Royal National Theatre |
| 1994 | Design for Living | Leo | Donmar Warehouse |
| 1995–96 | Long Day's Journey Into Night | Edmund | Young Vic |
| 1997 | King Lear | Edgar | Royal National Theatre; Nominated — Laurence Olivier Award |
| 1997 | The Invention of Love | Young Housman | Royal National Theatre (premiere run) |
| 1999–2000 | Hamlet | Hamlet | Young Vic; Barclays Theatre Award |
| 2004 | Measure for Measure | Angelo | Royal National Theatre; Critics' Circle Theatre Award |
| 2005 | Paul | Paul | Royal National Theatre (premiere run) |
| 2012 | The Master and Margarita | Woland/The Master | Barbican Theatre |
| 2016 | Uncle Vanya | Uncle Vanya | Almeida Theatre |
