= Arkie Whiteley =

Australian actress (1964–2001)

- Born: Deya Whiteley; 6 November 1964; Westminster, London, England
- Died: 19 December 2001 (aged 37); Sydney, Australia
- Resting place: Lavender Bay, Sydney, Australia
- Occupation: Actress
- Spouses: Christopher Kuhn (m. 1995; div. 1999); Jim Elliott (m. 2001)

Arkie Deya Whiteley (6 November 1964 – 19 December 2001) was an Australian actress who appeared in television and film.

== Early life and education ==
Whiteley's parents were the renowned Australian artist Brett Whiteley and cultural figure Wendy Whiteley. According to her obituary in The Times, when living with her parents at the Hotel Chelsea in New York as an infant, her babysitter was singer Janis Joplin. Arkie was educated at Ascham School in Sydney and at an alternative school: the Australian International School at North Ryde, Sydney. She also attended Cremorne Girls High.

== Career ==
Her television and film work included A Town Like Alice, Razorback, Mad Max 2: The Road Warrior, Gallowglass, Princess Caraboo and The Last Musketeer with Robson Green. She also appeared in the television series Prisoner as troubled prostitute/junkie Donna Mason and in early episodes of A Country Practice.

After her father's overdose in 1992, she negotiated with the New South Wales government to purchase his studio and run it as a studio museum managed by the Art Gallery of New South Wales.

== Personal life and death ==
Whiteley married her first husband Christopher Kuhn in 1995; they divorced in 1999. She married her second husband Jim Elliott in December 2001, shortly before she died from adrenal cancer on 19 December, at the age of 37. She had a seven-year relationship with actor Paul Rhys, who nursed her during her illness.

She was cremated at Northern Suburbs Crematorium. Both Arkie's and her father Brett's ashes are buried in an undisclosed location in Wendy's Secret Garden in the Sydney North Shore suburb of Lavender Bay.

== Filmography ==
=== Film ===
Year	Title	Role	Notes
1980	Slippery Slide		TV movie
1981	The Killing of Angel Street	Tina Benson	Feature film
1981	Mad Max 2: The Road Warrior	The Captain's Girl	Feature film
1984	Razorback	Sarah Cameron	Feature film
1989	Scandal	Vicky	Feature film
1990	The Secret Life of Ian Fleming	Gallina	TV movie
1994	Princess Caraboo	Betty	Feature film
1999	Without Warning	Megan Turner	TV movie
2000	The Last Musketeer	Dr. Elizabeth Fraser	TV movie

=== Television ===
Year	Title	Role	Notes
1978	People Like Us	Young Elaine Frith	Miniseries, 3 episodes
1979	A Place in the World		Miniseries, 1 episode
1980	Spring & Fall	Angela	Episode: "The Last Card"
1981	Menotti		1 episode
1981	Sporting Chance		Episode 2: "Nobody Loves A Loser"
1981	A Town Like Alice	Annie	Miniseries, 2 episodes
1981	A Country Practice	Jenny Secombe	2 episodes
1982	Prisoner	Donna Mason	13 episodes
1983–1984	Kings	Alison King	13 episodes
1990	Screen Two	Mary	Episode: "Drowning in the Shallow End"
1990	Perfect Scoundrels	Fleur	2 episodes
1991	Van der Valk	Ruth Van Der Valk	Episode: "Doctor Hoffmann's Children"
1991	4 Play	Girl on beach	Episode: "But Beautiful"
1992	Love Hurts	Annabel Golding	2 episodes
1992	Natural Lies	Jo Scott	3 episodes
1993	Gallowglass	Nina	Miniseries, 3 episodes
1993	Sweating Bullets	Patsy Stratton	Episode: "The Patsy"
1995	Casualty	Eleanor Morrisey	Episode: "Money for Nothing"
1996–1997	Kavanagh QC	Helen Ames	6 episodes
1998	The Grand	Madame Euphrasine de Bourg D'Oisans	Episode: "#2.5"
1998	McCallum	Catrin	Episode: "Beyond Good and Evil"
2000	A Dinner of Herbs	Madeleine Cottle	Miniseries, 3 episodes
2001	A Touch of Frost	Dr. Helena Gibson	Episode: "Benefit of the Doubt: Part 1" (final appearance)
