= The House of Stairs (Vine novel) =

Book by Ruth Rendell

- First edition (UK)
- Author: Barbara Vine (Ruth Rendell)
- Language: English
- Genre: Crime / Mystery novel
- Publisher: Viking (UK); Harmony (US)
- Publication date: 1 September 1988
- Publication place: United Kingdom
- Media type: Print/Audiobook
- Pages: 328 (paperback)
- ISBN: 0-14-011446-7
- OCLC: 59149231
- Preceded by: A Fatal Inversion
- Followed by: Gallowglass

The House of Stairs is a 1988 novel by British writer Ruth Rendell, published under the name Barbara Vine. Writing in The Washington Post, Michael Dirda referred to the novel as a "stunning suspense [thriller]".
