= Brett Whiteley Travelling Art Scholarship =

- Sponsored by: Art Gallery of New South Wales
- Country: Australia
- Rewards: A$25,000 and a three-month residency at the Cité internationale des arts, Paris
- First award: 1999
- Most recent winner: Mark Maurangi Carrol (2023)
- Website: Art Gallery of NSW

The Brett Whiteley Travelling Art Scholarship is an Australian annual art award in honour of the painter Brett Whiteley. The scholarship is administered by the Art Gallery of New South Wales.

Whiteley died in 1992. In 1999, his mother Beryl Whiteley (1917 – 2010) made funds available to establish a scholarship in his memory. The inspiration for the scholarship was the profound effect of international travel and study experienced by Brett as a result of winning the Italian Travelling Art Scholarship at the age of 20.

The Brett Whiteley Travelling Art Scholarship is open to Australian artists aged between 20 and 30. The winner receives A$25,000 and a three-month residency at the Cite Internationale des Arts in Paris.

In 2004, Beryl Whiteley was awarded the Medal of the Order of Australia (OAM) for her service as a benefactor to the visual arts through the creation and endowment of the scholarship. Brett Whiteley himself was appointed an Officer (AO) of the order a year before his death.

In recent years, Brett Whiteley's ex-wife Wendy Whiteley has presented the prizes.

Beryl Whiteley died on 1 April 2010, aged 93.

== Winners of the Brett Whiteley Travelling Art Scholarship ==
- 1999: Alice Byrne, Newtown shed
- 2000: Marcus Wills, Parable of the sower
- 2001: Petrea Fellows, Treescape
- 2002: Ben Quilty, Elwood Park
- 2003: Karlee Rawkins, Bitch in India
- 2004: Alan Jones (artist), Figure # 11
- 2005: Wayde Owen, Californian Quail
- 2006: Samuel Wade, Grey Day at Central
- 2007: Nathan Hawkes, Icebergs
- 2008: Amber Wallace, Untitled landscape
- 2009: Nicole Kelly, Figure in landscape
- 2010: Belem Lett
- 2011: Becky Gibson
- 2012: Mitch Cairns
- 2013: Tim Phillips
- 2014: James Francis Drinkwater
- 2015: Tom Polo
- 2016: Lucy O'Doherty
- 2017: Sally Anderson, Dilling's Bromeliads with Gullfoss Falls
- 2018: Natasha Walsh, Dear Frida
- 2020: Emily Grace Imeson, Home Amongst Giants Study
- 2021: Mia Boe, Mia and Eliza Fraser
- 2022: Bill Hawkins, Butterfly brut
- 2023: Mark Maurangi Carrol, Psalm (part-1)
