= Noel Paine =

English painter (born 1971)

- Born: 1971 (age 54–55); Woolwich, London, England
- Education: The Cardiff Metropolitan University; The College of Charleston, South Carolina; Canterbury Christ Church University
- Known for: Painting
- Movement: En plein air, Landscape painting

Noel Paine (born 1971 in Woolwich, London) is an English artist, currently based in Lazio, Italy and Vienna, Austria.

== Life and career ==
Noel Paine was born in 1971 in Woolwich, London. He was educated at Colfe's School, London. He studied Art and Aesthetics at The Cardiff Metropolitan University (formerly the Cardiff Institute of Higher Education); The College of Charleston, South Carolina (he worked under Prof. Michael Tyzack and as studio assistant to David Novros). In 1998, he completed an MA degree in Fine Art at Canterbury Christ Church University in Kent.

In 1995, he worked for a year in a studio in New York City. Returning to London in 1996, he worked at a Barbican Arts Trust studio, he was then awarded a ‘Fire Station’ residency with Acme Studios, London. From 2001 he worked from a studio at Trinity Buoy Wharf, before going to work in the Italian campagna, Rome and the surrounding region. He currently maintains a studio in Anticoli Corrado in Lazio, and in Vienna, Austria to where he moved in 2013.

== Work ==
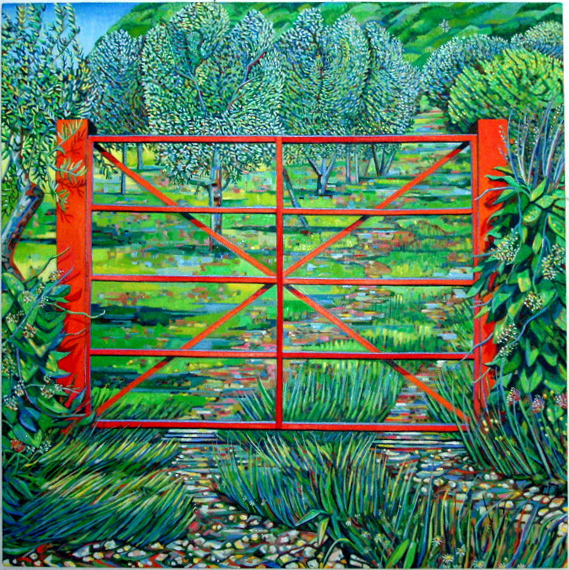
‘The Red Gate’, Private Collection, 2012

Paine is a landscape painter. He divides his working practice between working directly outside in the landscape and within the studio. He paints predominately from drawings, completing large oil on canvas works in the studio. Although his paintings are widely recognised for their distinctive figuration, the themes and ideas behind the paintings remain conceptually abstract.

I do not set out to make a ‘picture’ of a tree, instead I want to explore the colour, line, shape and light of a tree. I like to remove myself from a subject in a visual sense and direct observation because when I live with a subject day after day, the ‘realness’ of the subject remains. I can take the abstract qualities as far as I like in any given subject, but if I maintain the ‘realness’ through re-drawing each time I am in front of it, the subconscious ‘real’ is always there.

— Noel Paine

Paine lectures at The National Gallery and The Art Academy, London.

== Exhibitions ==
Exhibitions include:

- BP Portrait Award, National Portrait Gallery, 1996;
- The Discerning Eye, Mall Gallery 2000;
- Docklands Landscapes, Dash Gallery, Tower Hamlets 2002;
- Il Tempo Rivelato, Archaeological Museum, Mondragone, Italy 2010;
- London & Londoners, Mayor's Office, City Hall, London 2010;
- Circled Seasons, and Un Giorno Ancora (Recent Italian Paintings), Menier Gallery 2008 and 2011;
- Recent Paintings, Gallery 27, Cork Street 2013.
