= Agatha Gothe-Snape =

Australian artist

Agatha Gothe-Snape (born 1980) is an Australian artist who lives and works in Sydney, Australia. Her works range from digital slide presentations to performances to works on paper and, more recently, collaborative sound installations. A number of Gothe-Snape's works are held by a range of public galleries and collections, including the Art Gallery of New South Wales, Campbelltown Arts Centre, University of Western Australia, Griffith University Art Collection, Heide Museum of Modern Art, Monash University Museum of Art and National Gallery of Victoria. Gothe-Snape's partner is Australian artist Mitch Cairns, who won the Art Gallery of New South Wales's Archibald Prize in 2017 with a portrait of her.

== Career ==
Gothe-Snape's first exhibition was in 2006 and since then her works have been included in a range of exhibitions, including Performa 15, the 8th Berlin Biennale for Contemporary Art in 2014, Art as a Verb at Monash University Museum of Art in 2014, Trace: Performance and its Documents at Queensland Art Gallery in 2014, Melbourne Now at the National Gallery of Victoria in 2013, Reinventing the Wheel: The Readymade Century at Monash University Museum of Art in 2013, Contemporary Australia: Women at Queensland Art Gallery in 2012, Power to the People: Contemporary Conceptualism and the Object in Art at the Australian Centre for Contemporary Art in 2011 and Primavera at the Museum of Contemporary Art, Sydney in 2010. Solo exhibitions and performances include: Agatha Gothe-Snape –Trying to find comfort in an uncomfortable chair, with the Cruthers Collection of Women's Art, Perth Institute of Contemporary Art (2019); Rhetorical Chorus, Performance Space, Sydney (2017); and Oh Window, Mori Art Museum, Tokyo (2017). She was awarded the Sydney Biennale Legacy Artwork commission in 2016 for an installation, titled Here, an Echo, which consisted of large text printed using roadmarking materials on the road and brick walls in Wemyss Lane, Surry Hills in Sydney, Australia. In 2020, a survey exhibition of her key works from 2008 to the present was exhibited at Monash University Museum of Art.

Gothe-Snape has also been involved in a longstanding collaborative performance project with artist Brian Fuata called Wrong Solo.
