= Food of Love (2002 film) =

- Directed by: Ventura Pons
- Written by: David Leavitt; Ventura Pons
- Produced by: Gemma Folch; Monika Ganzenmüller; Ventura Pons; Petra Schepeler; Aintza Serra; Michael Smeaton; Thomas Spieker
- Cinematography: Mario Montero
- Edited by: Pere Abadal
- Music by: Carles Cases
- Production companies: 42nd Street Productions S.L. Els Films de la Rambla; FFP Media Entertainment; Televisió de Catalunya (TV3) (as TVC); Televisión Española (TVE); Vía Digital
- Distributed by: Indie Rights; Laurenfilm; PPR Films; Salzgeber & Company Medien; TLA Releasing
- Release date: February 1, 2002 (Spain)
- Running time: 112 minutes
- Country: Spain
- Language: English
- Box office: $113,164

Food of Love is a 2002 Spanish/German film based on the 1998 novel The Page Turner by David Leavitt. The screenplay was written by Ventura Pons who also directed the feature.

In 2002, the film was the Official Selection at the Berlin International Film Festival, the Montreal World Film Festival and San Francisco International Gay & Lesbian Film Festival and the Philadelphia International Gay & Lesbian Film Festival.

The film was released on DVD by Peccadillo Pictures in 2004.

== Plot ==
Paul Porterfield (Kevin Bishop) is an 18-year-old music student who is offered the chance to be the page turner for the acclaimed pianist Richard Kennington (Paul Rhys). Kennington, and his agent and lover Joseph Mansourian (Allan Corduner), is instantly attracted to Paul's youth and attractiveness, but Kennington's attempts to get to know Paul better are thwarted by Paul's possessive, neurotic mother, Pamela (Juliet Stevenson) who is initially unaware of the attraction. She dotes on her son but is faced with the revelation that her husband is cheating on her and the exasperation of her son, who feels suffocated by her love. Paul is keen to escape his mother and meets Kennington in a hotel; After talking Kennington offers Paul a massage which leads on to other things. After meeting up again in Barcelona, the two begin an affair behind the back of Pamela and Mansourian, who consistently attempts to contact Kennington to no avail after his dog dies. On the last day before Kennington returns to New York City, and Pamela and Paul head on to Granada, Pamela makes excuses and goes to Kennington's hotel to seduce him. He is clearly not interested. While consoling herself in the bathroom, she finds a pair of her son's boxer shorts hanging on the shower line.

After Kennington returns to New York, and Pamela and Paul head on to Granada, the affair seems over. Six months later Paul, now at Music College and in a relationship with another older man, meets Mansourian again who invites him to page turn at a private event, where he later seduces Paul unaware of his previous connection with Kennington. Again his mother is unaware, but while cleaning Paul's room after he returns for Christmas, she finds a photo of Kennington, with a love note written on the back, in his suitcase. She attempts to confront Paul and later Kennington as the revelations are faced by Paul, Pamela, Kennington and Mansourian. Pamela then attends a PFLAG meeting where she discovers her now ex-husband's wife has a lesbian daughter.

== Cast ==
- Kevin Bishop - Paul
- Paul Rhys - Richard
- Juliet Stevenson - Pamela
- Allan Corduner - Joseph
- Craig Hill - Izzy
- Leslie Charles - Tushi
- Pamela Field - Diane
- Naim Thomas - Teddy
- Geraldine McEwan - Novotna
