= Gallowglass (TV series) =

- VHS cover
- Genre: Drama
- Written by: Ruth Rendell
- Screenplay by: Jacqueline Holborough
- Directed by: Tim Fywell
- Starring: Michael Sheen; Paul Rhys
- Country of origin: United Kingdom
- Original language: English
- No. of series: 1
- No. of episodes: 3

Production
- Producer: BBC
- Running time: 157 minutes

Original release
- Network: BBC1
- Release: 10 January – 24 January 1993

Gallowglass is a 1993 British television mystery serial adaptation of the 1990 Ruth Rendell novel of the same name. It is a three-part drama.

== Plot ==
Joe is saved by Sandor from committing suicide in front of an oncoming tube train. Sandor now demands his absolute loyalty and teaches Joe that he is now a 'gallowglass', a servant of a chief. So deep is Joe's gratitude that he helps with the kidnapping of a young wealthy married woman, Nina, whom Sandor is obsessed with. His adoptive sister Tilly is also involved in the plot, which also involves the abduction of the daughter of Nina's bodyguard.

Nina and the child are both released when the ransom is paid, and soon after this Sandor jumps to his death into the path of a train as Joe watches. Nina is then lured to her death by Gianni, a former gay partner of Sandor, and her body is found buried in woodland a few days later. Sandor's mother, who had no other children, then accepts Joe as her second son, and he begins a relationship with Tilly.

== Cast ==
- Michael Sheen – Joe
- Paul Rhys – Sandor
- Arkie Whiteley – Nina
- John McArdle – Paul
- Claire Hackett – Tilly
- Gary Waldhorn – Ralph Apsoland
- Harriet Owen – Jessica

== Reception ==
A review in the Los Angeles Times stated that the series was "driven largely by Rhys’ seething energy as the dangerous Sandor, with support from Sheen’s slothful, spineless Joe. Even they cannot adrenalize a laborious section of Part 3 that stalls the story, but director Tim Fywell (“A Dark Adapted Eye”) gets it all together in time for a multiple-twist ending that is interestingly complex if not entirely logical." Described as "a moody TV mystery", it has been found to be "Not one of the better BBC adaptations of a Ruth Rendell novel".
