= Wendy Whiteley =

Australian artist (born 1941)

Wendy Whiteley OAM
- Born: Wendy Susan Julius; 1941 (age 84–85); Sydney, New South Wales, Australia
- Education: National Art School
- Known for: Visual arts
- Movement: Avant-garde
- Spouse: Brett Whiteley (m. 1962; div. 1989)

Wendy Susan Whiteley OAM (née Julius; born 1941) is best known as the former wife of the Australian artist Brett Whiteley, and as the mother of their daughter, actress Arkie Whiteley (1964–2001). She has become a notable cultural figure, particularly since her ex-husband's death in 1992. She posed for Brett many times. Although they divorced three years before he died, she has control of Brett Whiteley's estate including the copyright to his works. She played an important role in the establishment of the Brett Whiteley Studio in Surry Hills which is now owned and managed as an art museum by the Art Gallery of New South Wales.

Wendy Whiteley is also known for the restoration and landscaping of derelict railway land in Lavender Bay, which she turned into a secret garden and where her ex-husband Brett and daughter Arkie Whiteley's ashes were scattered.

== Background and early years ==
Wendy Susan Julius was born in Sydney in 1941, the elder of two daughters. She came from a creative lineage. Her great-grandfather was Charles Yelverton O'Connor, engineer for Fremantle Harbour and the Goldfields Water Supply Scheme, who committed suicide ten months before the pipeline was opened. Her grandfather was George Julius, the inventor of the totalisator and co-founder of the CSIRO. A great-aunt, Kate O'Connor, was a painter who lived in Paris most of her life.

Her father, George Yelverton Julius, known as "Gentleman George", was thrown out by her mother for infidelity when Wendy was six and she and her sister have little or no memory of him. When Wendy was about 12, she was devastated to read in the newspapers that her father had been sent to prison for eight years for burglary. Her mother later remarried and had two more children.

Wendy attended Lindfield Public School and Hornsby Girls' High School. She won art awards and a David Jones Drawing Prize, which defrayed the costs of her formal studies at East Sydney Technical College.

== Relationship with Brett Whiteley ==
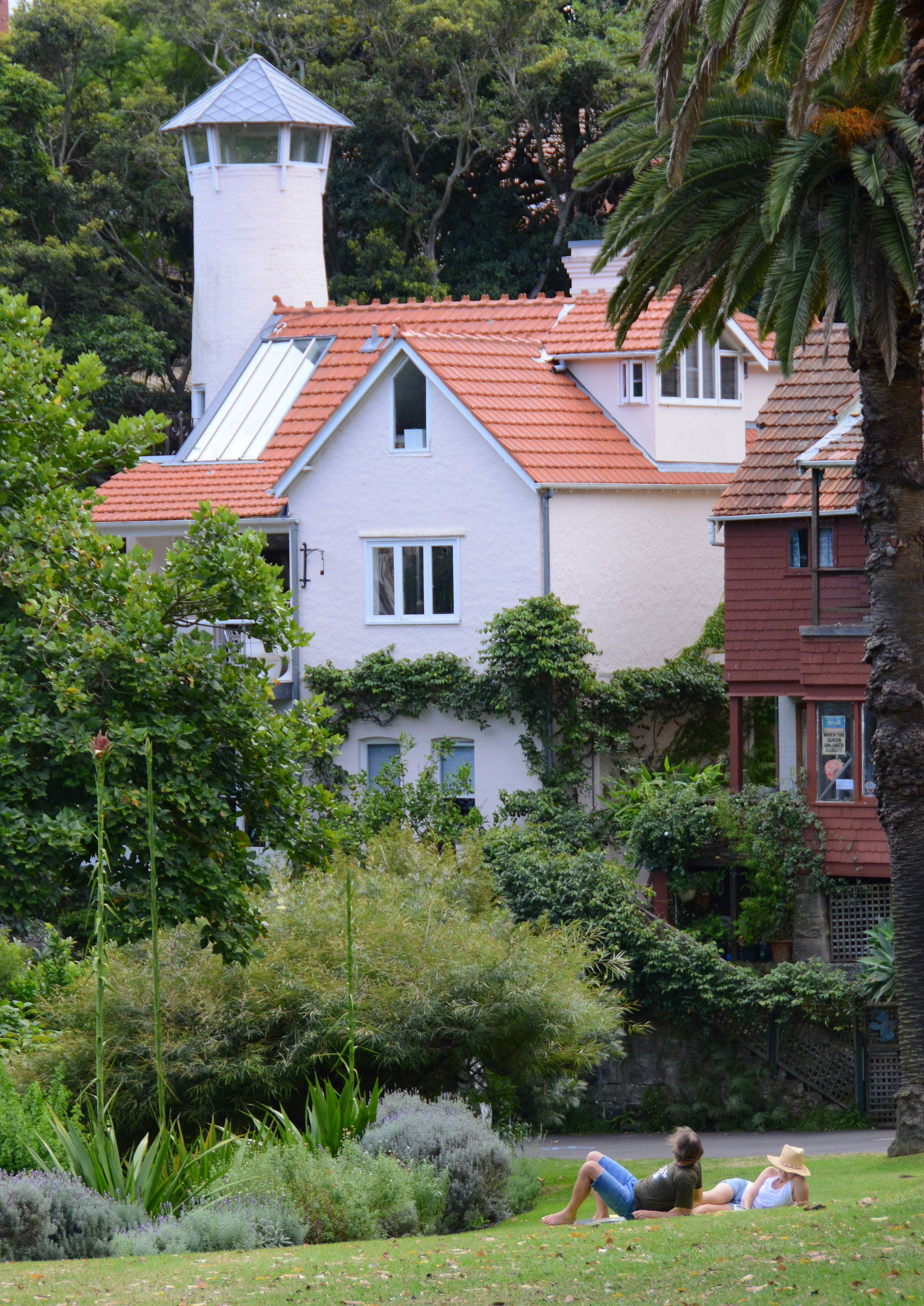
Former Brett Whiteley home at Lavender Bay

In 1956, aged 15, she met the 17-year-old Brett Whiteley. It is sometimes claimed that this meeting occurred at Jerichos, a Sydney coffee shop known for its bohemian clientele, but while they spent time there, they in fact were introduced to each other at Longueville by Tony Applebaum, a mutual friend. There was an immediate mutual attraction and they soon became lovers. At that time, Brett was attending the life drawing classes at the Julian Ashton Art School, while working for Lintas Advertising. A short time before their meeting, Brett's mother Beryl had separated from her husband and moved overseas. Brett was devastated when she refused his entreaties to come home. He was still living with his father Clem Whiteley, and Wendy moved in; she also went to work for Clem's interior design business. As a couple, their sense of style and extravagance was compared with that of Scott and Zelda Fitzgerald. Their relationship had extremes of passion right from the start.

In November 1959, Brett was awarded an Italian Government Travelling Art Scholarship. He wanted to take Wendy with him, but Clem refused to supply the necessary money; there were quarrels, which resulted in Wendy moving out of the house. She saw Brett off on the boat, and then started working 18 hours a day to earn the money to pay her own way to Europe. Brett arrived in Italy in February 1960, and Wendy reunited with him in Paris on 14 June. They lived in Florence for some months, and in 1961 they moved to London and set up his studio there. In March 1962 his first one-man exhibition, at the Matthiesen Galleries, was a financial success, which prompted them to marry on 27 March, in the Chelsea registry office. They had en extended honeymoon in the south of France, where his Summer at Sigean had its genesis. At the time, Brett said: "If ever I have a retrospective, it will be a chronological testament to Wendy – to my relationship with her". After their return to London, Brett started on the Bathroom paintings, a major series of nudes celebrating Wendy's form and his domestic happiness.

Wendy worked as a fashion under-buyer for Harvey Nichols. Wendy and Brett's daughter Arkie Whiteley was born in London on 6 November 1964. They returned to Australia in December 1965, living at Whale Beach, north of Sydney, where Arkie took her first steps.

In 1967 they moved to New York for Brett to take up a Harkness Fellowship scholarship. They sailed on the RMS Queen Elizabeth, not the Queen Mary as sometimes claimed. They went to the Hotel Chelsea and purely by chance were given the penthouse apartment. At that time, Arkie was frequently looked after by baby-sitters, who included Janis Joplin. Brett Whiteley was working feverishly on his paintings, particularly The American Dream, becoming very stressed, and turning to alcohol for relief. Wendy opened a clothes shop in New York called the Put On. Brett was unhappy about this; he explained that it reminded him too much of his own mother leaving his father as soon as she was financially independent. Wendy called his bluff, and Brett took up with a woman named Constance Abernathy for a few weeks, but he returned to Wendy after Constance fell down an elevator shaft and broke her teeth. Brett had other occasional affairs during this time, and Wendy herself, some years later, back in Australia, had an affair with Michael Driscoll, whom they had met at the National Art School and who had become their long-time friend. Prior to her affair, Wendy, Brett and Michael tried heroin together for the first time. While it was intended to be a one-off experience, it ultimately led to total heroin addiction for both Wendy and Brett. They attended a treatment clinic in England together, but both returned to heroin a few weeks later. Wendy later overcame her addiction.

In July 1969 Brett's physical and mental fatigue caused him to abandon work on The American Dream and to quickly leave New York for Fiji, with his family. They stayed there for five months, living in a small village, mixing with the Fijians, and far from all communications. They had a rooster, an old car, and some bedding. They decided to stay permanently, living a life of utter simplicity in a tranquil tropical paradise, in the manner of Paul Gauguin in Tahiti. They were given two-thirds of an island by the village chief. In November, Brett rented an old barn in Suva to show off his recent work done in Fiji. At the opening, in conversation with officials and politicians, he naively talked about drugs. The next day the barn was raided and a small quantity of marijuana was found, for which he was fined £F50. The Whiteleys were subsequently given a very short time to pack up and leave Fiji.

They returned to Australia, and moved into a Federation house originally known as Lochgyle, built in 1905, in the Sydney suburb of Lavender Bay. They had travelled widely, visiting many of the world's great art museums and exhibitions. But the five-year-old Arkie said she was sick of moving and losing her friends every time she moved, and that she wanted to stay in one place. This made Wendy and Brett decide to settle down in Lavender Bay. Initially they rented one floor of the house, but in 1974 they bought the house outright. The interior of the home was frequently the subject of Brett's paintings, often with Wendy's naked form reclining on a sofa or in the bathtub.

In 1985, Brett bought an abandoned T-shirt factory in Surry Hills and turned it into a studio away from home. Their tandem heroin addiction continued, and in 1987 they were advised to seek separate treatment; Brett would stay to work in Australia, while Wendy and Arkie went to England. On Wendy's return from England in 1988, clean of heroin, Brett was now in a relationship with Janice Spencer, whom he had met at a Narcotics Anonymous meeting earlier that year, and was also still using heroin. Wendy refused to share the same house as Brett for fear of becoming trapped in heroin addiction once more, so Brett took up residence in his Surry Hills studio. They were divorced in 1989.

Brett Whiteley died of a heroin overdose in 1992, Janice Spencer died of a heroin overdose in 2000, and Arkie died of cancer in 2001. The Surry Hills studio is now the location of the Brett Whiteley Studio, an art museum that was operated initially by Wendy in Brett's memory, but is now owned and managed by the Art Gallery of New South Wales.

== Wendy's secret garden ==
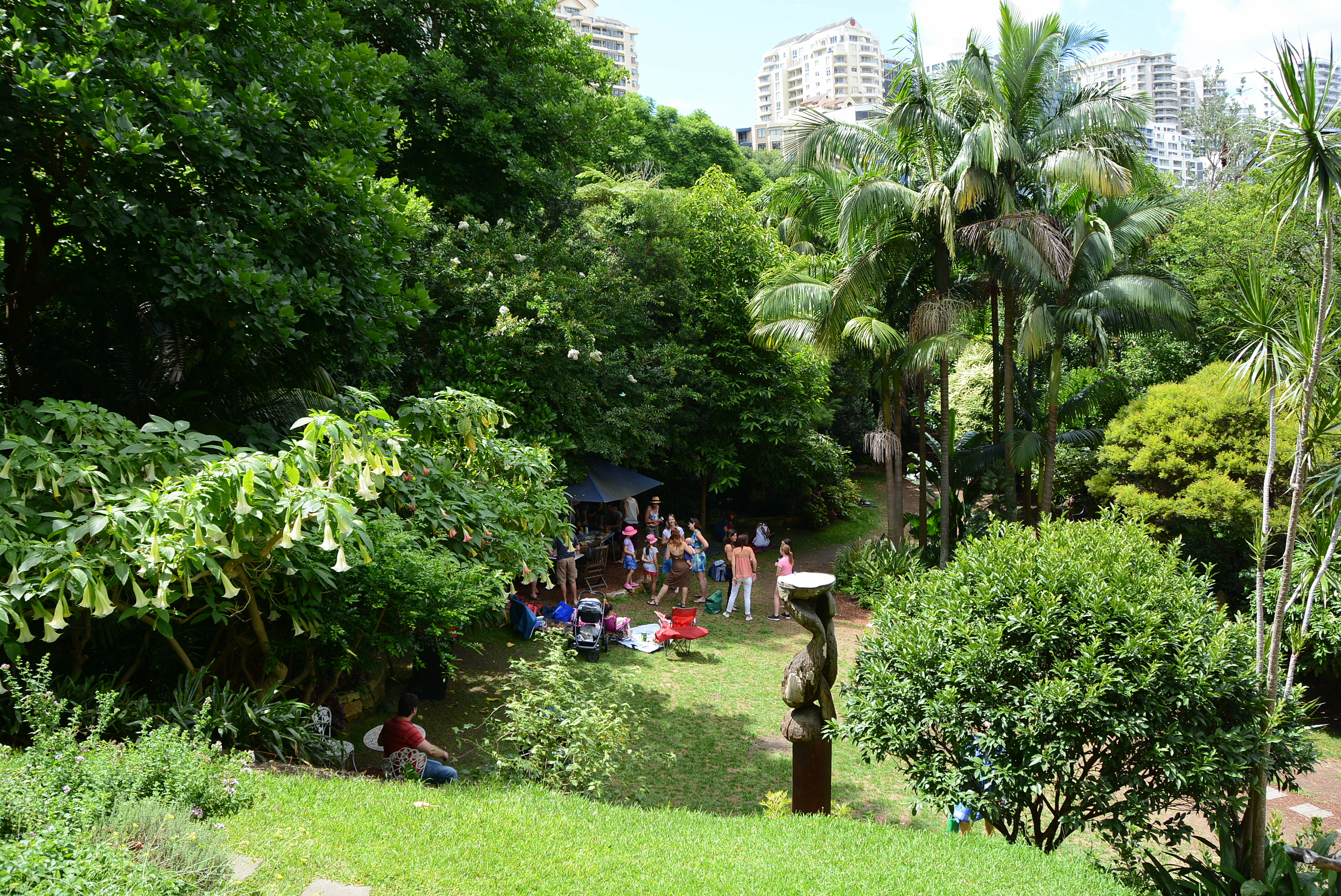
Wendy Whiteley's Secret Garden

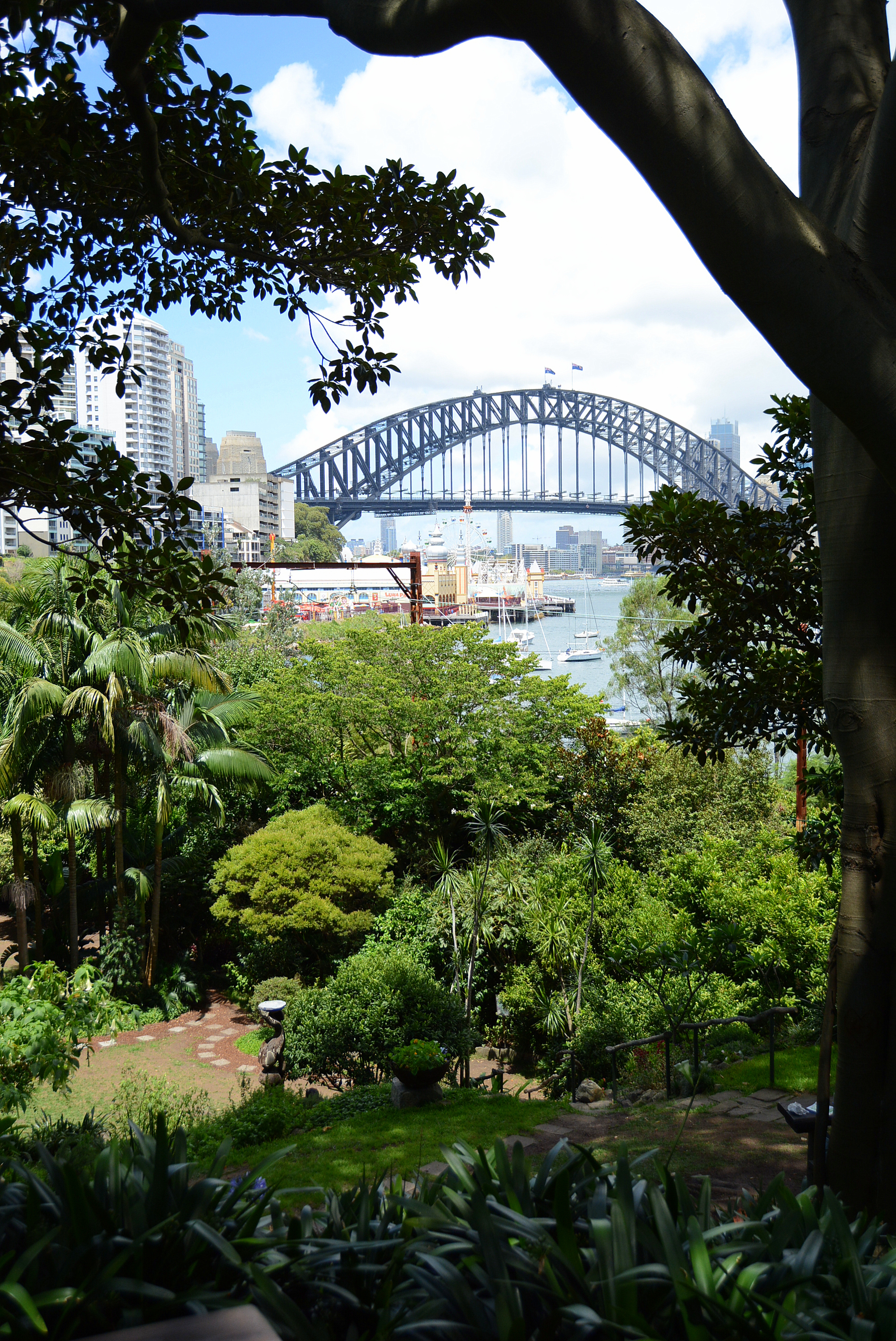
View of the Bay

Wendy Whiteley showed artistic ability during her teens. Brett believed her life drawing talent and understanding of colour was superior to his. Wendy suppressed her own artistic ambitions to be a wife and mother. After Brett's death she found a new outlet for her creativity.

At considerable personal expense—in Ashleigh Wilson's 'A Year with Wendy Whiteley', she estimates the garden has cost her about three million dollars, taking in wages and equipment and other expenses—Wendy started to clean up and landscape a large patch of derelict land adjacent to her home in Lavender Bay, owned by RailCorp. It was choked by weeds and lantanas, and strewn with old train carriages, abandoned refrigerators, rotting mattresses and broken bottles. Homeless people sometimes slept there. RailCorp had no interest in doing anything with it, and they raised no objections to her beautifying the area. They even helped by removing the larger pieces of junk. Wendy treated the garden like a giant painting, structuring, planting, pruning, moving things around, and letting nature do its work. Over a period of fifteen years, the garden became a coveted spot for those who had heard about or chanced upon it, with random benches in quiet spots, secluded paths, and a spectacular view to the Sydney Harbour Bridge. A wide variety of birdlife previously unknown to the area arrived. It has been described as rivalling Claude Monet's garden. It is affectionately known by locals as "Wendy's Secret Garden", although the public have always had free access. Features of the garden include an antique fountain from the Paddington garden of Margaret Olley, Bangalore palms donated by Arkie and objects found in the scrub, like an old tricycle and a child's scooter.

As well as helping her mother with the project, Arkie planned to hold her second wedding ceremony, to Jim Elliott, in the garden. However, her adrenal gland cancer intervened, and they married in the house overlooking the garden, only a few weeks before Arkie's death in 2001. The ashes of both Brett and Arkie were scattered in the garden, as were the ashes of Wendy's father and mother, her twin sister Joyce and her beloved pet dogs.

In 2009, Wendy Whiteley was awarded the Medal of the Order of Australia (OAM) for "service to the community through the establishment and maintenance of a public garden at Lavender Bay, and as a supporter of the visual arts".

In October 2015, the Government of New South Wales, which owns the land, agreed to give the North Sydney Council a thirty-year renewable lease on it.

Members of the community are able to help maintain the gardens. These days are co-ordinated by the Lavender Bay Precinct.

== Brett Whiteley's will and other matters ==
Brett's will became the subject of a major legal dispute. Janice Spencer claimed she had lived with Brett for the last five years of his life, and produced a will that left the estate to her. Arkie Whiteley claimed that her father had hand-written a revised will after his divorce, leaving everything to her, but that the piece of paper was lost. Ultimately, the Supreme Court of New South Wales found in Arkie's favour, but permitted Janice Spencer one painting, a large erotic portrait of herself, Sunday Afternoon, Surry Hills, which Brett had painted in 1988 at the height of their relationship. A shortage of money forced her to sell it in 1995, and it attracted $239,000 at auction.

Arkie's first marriage, to Christopher Kuhn, ended in divorce. Arkie left Wendy the bulk of the artworks she had inherited from Brett, and those works as well as Wendy's own collection of Brett's paintings and artefacts became the genesis of the Brett Whiteley Studio. Before her death in 2001, Arkie had commenced negotiations with the Art Gallery of New South Wales for them to take over and manage the studio, and these negotiations were later successfully concluded by Wendy.

== Public life ==
Wendy Whiteley has become a well-known figure in Australia's artistic life. She appears at gallery openings, as a judge at art competitions, gives talks about Brett Whiteley, arranges and curates exhibitions of his work, and presents winners of the Brett Whiteley Travelling Art Scholarship with their prizes, on behalf of the late benefactress, Brett's mother Beryl Whiteley OAM.

The story of her life was covered in detail in Ashleigh Wilson's 2022 book, A Year with Wendy Whiteley: Conversations About Art, Life and Gardening. About the book Miriam Margolyes said: 'This astonishing, glorious book reveals Wendy Whiteley as she really is—an artist in her own right, a unique personality. Wendy tells the truth: she made a garden for Australia. And found the right person to tell her amazing story.'

Wendy was also the subject of an Australian Story program in 2004, and has had magazine articles written about her from time to time.

For the Archibald Prize, a prize that Brett Whiteley won twice, in 1976 and 1978, Wendy has been the sitter for portraits by Danelle Bergstrom, Garry Shead and John Phillips; none of which won the award.

On 8 December 2008, Wendy Whiteley was Andrew Denton's final guest on ABC TV Enough Rope. She was interviewed by Peter Thompson on ABC TV's Talking Heads on 10 August 2009.

== Bibliography ==
- A Year with Wendy Whiteley, Ashleigh Wilson (Text Publishing) 2022
- Wendy Whiteley and the Secret Garden, Janet Hawley (Lantern) 2015 ISBN 9781921383939
- Hilton, Margot; Blundell, Graeme (1996). Whiteley: An Unauthorised Life. MacMillan.
- McGrath, Sandra (1979). Brett Whiteley (revised 1992, reprinted 1995 ed.). Rushcutters Bay: Bay Books.
- Brett Whiteley Studio
- Brett Whiteley Studio – Life line
- North Sydney Council: Rail Corp Beautification Lease – Wendy Whiteley's Secret Garden
- Wendy Whiteley at IMDb
- Arkie Whiteley at IMDb
- Australian Government: Culture and Recreation Portal
- Ben Hills: A Brush With Fame
- Time Out Sydney: Walkabout: #1 on Blues Point Road
- jac bowie pr & events: 2006 Brett Whiteley Travelling Art Scholarship
- Regionale art consultants: More Affordable Fine Art – Why Not a Graphic?
- Finally a lease on Wendy's garden
- "Doodles from the edge", Benjamin Genocchio, Weekend Australian, 13–14 May 2000
