= Lavender Bay =

- Suburb
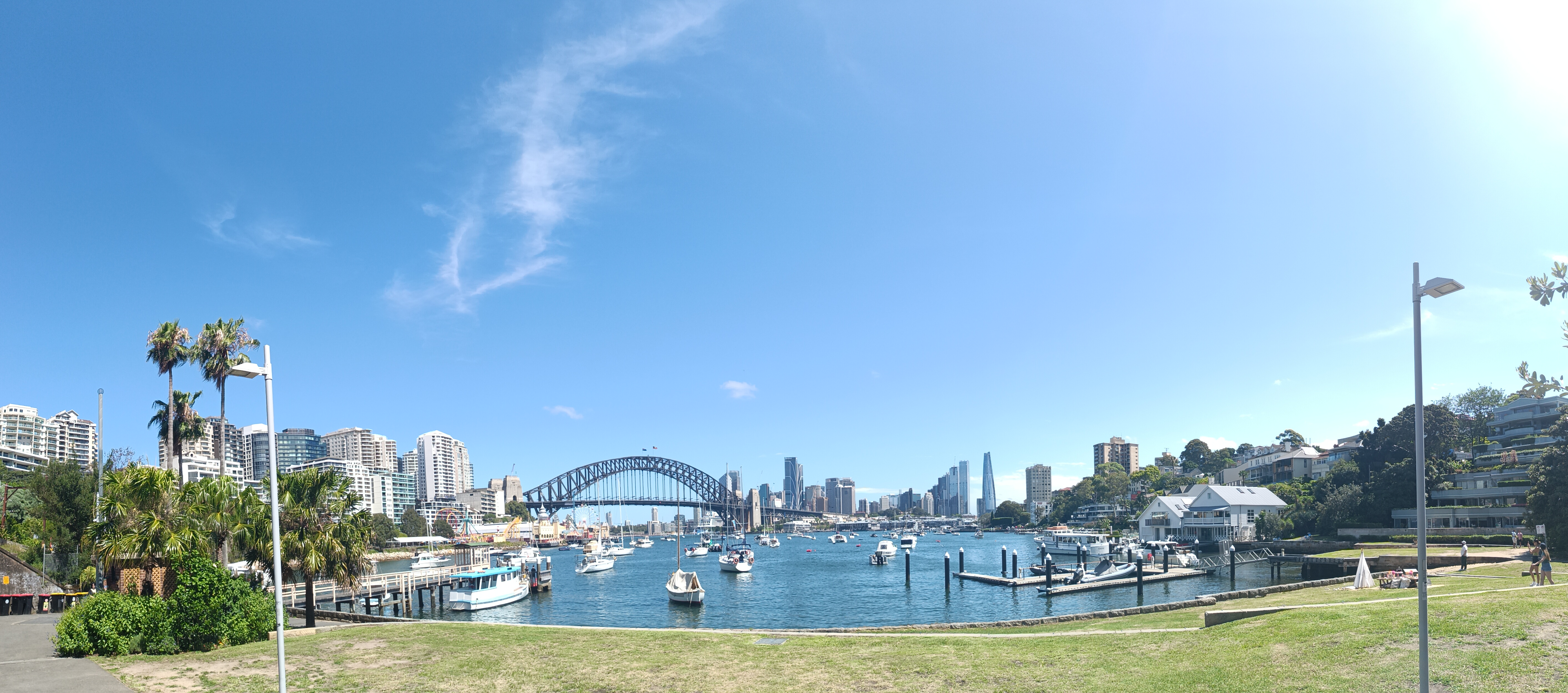
- Lavender Bay, NSW

- Interactive map of Lavender Bay
- Country: Australia
- State: New South Wales
- City: Sydney
- LGA: North Sydney Council
- Location: 3 km (1.9 mi) north of Sydney CBD

Government
  - State electorate: North Shore
  - Federal division: Warringah

Area
  - Total: 0.2 km^{2} (0.077 sq mi)

Population
  - Total: 870 (2021 census)
  - Density: 4,400/km^{2} (11,300/sq mi)
- Postcode: 2060
Suburbs around Lavender Bay
North Sydney	North Sydney	North Sydney
McMahons Point	Lavender Bay	Milsons Point
	Dawes Point

Lavender Bay is a harbourside suburb on the Lower North Shore of Sydney, New South Wales, Australia. Lavender Bay is located three kilometres north of the Sydney central business district, in the local government area of North Sydney Council.

The suburb takes its name from Lavender Bay, a natural feature of Port Jackson (Sydney Harbour) immediately west of the Sydney Harbour Bridge. It lies between Milsons Point and McMahons Point. The suburb North Sydney is located to the north. Lavender Bay is a residential suburb with expansive views of Sydney Harbour.

== History ==
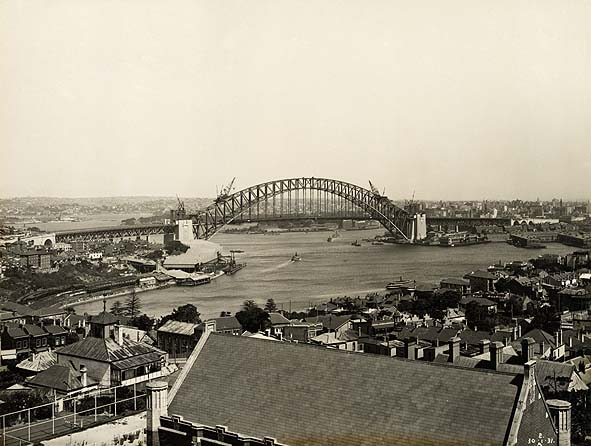
Lavender Bay in 1931 with the Sydney Harbour Bridge under construction and Lavender Bay railway station on the left

Lavender Bay was named after the boatswain (bosun) George Lavender from the prison hulk Phoenix, which was moored there for many years. The bay is dual-named Gooweebahree, (also sometimes written as Quiberee) in the Dharug language of the local inhabitants, the Cammeraygal people of the Eora nation. The colonists also called it Hulk Bay and sometimes Phoenix Bay. George Lavender lived on 14 acres (5.7 ha) adjacent to the property of Billy Blue.

On 30 May 1915 Lavender Bay railway station was opened to take the place of Milsons Point railway station. This only lasted for seven weeks, as passengers refused to alight here and demanded that trains stop at Milsons Point. During the Sydney Harbour Bridge construction, Lavender Bay station was the terminus of the North Shore railway line. The area is now used to stable Sydney Trains rolling stock.

=== Heritage listings ===
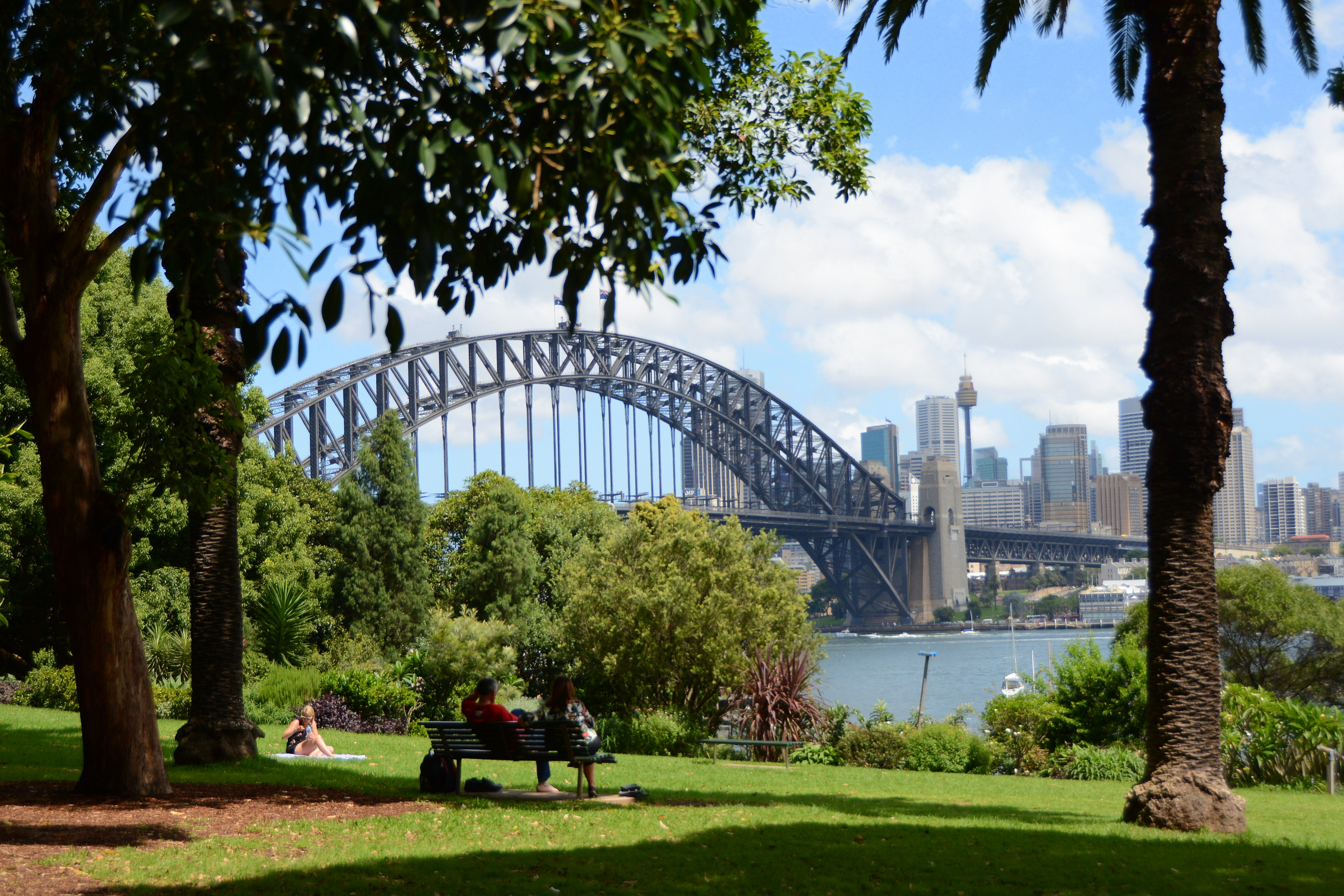
The Harbour Bridge from Clark Park, Lavender Bay

Lavender Bay has a number of heritage-listed sites, including:

- 1 Walker Street: Brett Whiteley House

== Population ==
In the 2021 Census, there were 870 people in Lavender Bay. 59.4% of people were born in Australia and 75.5% of people spoke only English at home. The most common responses for religion were No Religion 41.6% and Catholic 23.9%.

== Landmarks ==
- A wharf is located in the bay which provides access to private vessels.
- The Lavender Bay Baths (1910), also known as Cavill's Baths, a tidal swimming pool, were once popular with swimmers, located in the area beside the ferry wharf.
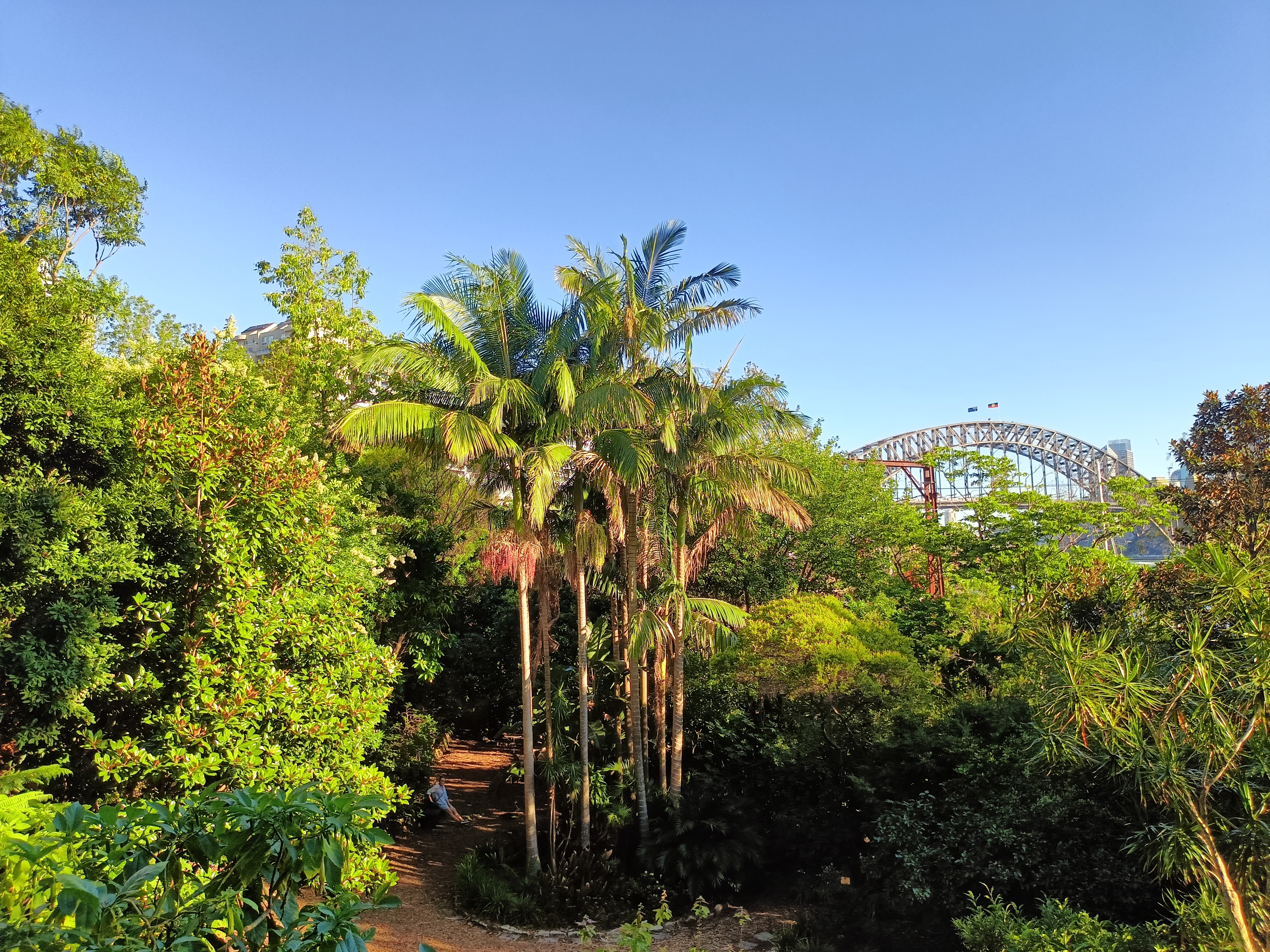
  Wendy's Secret Garden
- Wendy Whiteley created a garden in 1992 adjacent to her home, in an overgrown railway siding between Clark Park and the old railway line. Known as Wendy's Whiteley's Secret Garden, it is now operated by a trust and is open to the public.

== Churches ==
- Christ Church, Lavender Bay, a Lower North Shore landmark.
- The Jesuit Church of St Francis Xavier was founded in 1856 and is now part of North Sydney Parish.

== Notable residents ==
- Cricketer Don Bradman lived in the harbourfront Bay View Street, and was one of the first few Australians to get a private telephone number while living in Bay View Street.
- Artist Norman Lindsay lived at 'Heidelberg' at 9 Bay View Street
- Artist Brett Whiteley lived in a house overlooking the Bay with his wife Wendy Whiteley; Wendy continued to live there as of 2019. In 2018 the NSW Government granted heritage status to the Whiteleys' house, its views of Sydney Harbour, and the Secret Garden.
- Artist Peter Kingston lived at 3 Walker Street. Many of his most well known artworks depict the view of the Bay from his home.
