= Auto Italia South East =

Auto Italia

- Established: 2007
- Location: 44 Bonner Road; Bethnal Green; Tower Hamlets; London E2 9JS
- Coordinates: 51.532414°N 0.052351°W
- Type: Artist-run project, non-profit organisation
- Directors: Kate Cooper; Marianne Forrest; Edward Gillman
- Public transit access: No. 8, 26, 254, D3 buses; Bethnal Green, Cambridge Heath Overground
- Website: www.autoitaliasoutheast.org

Auto Italia is an artist-run project and studio in Bethnal Green, London, England. It commissions and produces new artwork, collaborating directly with emerging artists. Throughout its history, Auto Italia’s work has taken many forms, ranging from collaborative public programming in temporary spaces, commissions and presentations in institutions and galleries, and the production of collaborative projects through working online.

This work has been shown nationally and internationally at Tate Modern and Institute of Contemporary Arts in London; KW Institute for Contemporary Art and abc – art berlin contemporary in Berlin; Artissima LIDO in Turin; Hessel Museum in New York; Künstlerhaus Bremen and Firstdraft in Sydney amongst others.

== Auto Italia ==
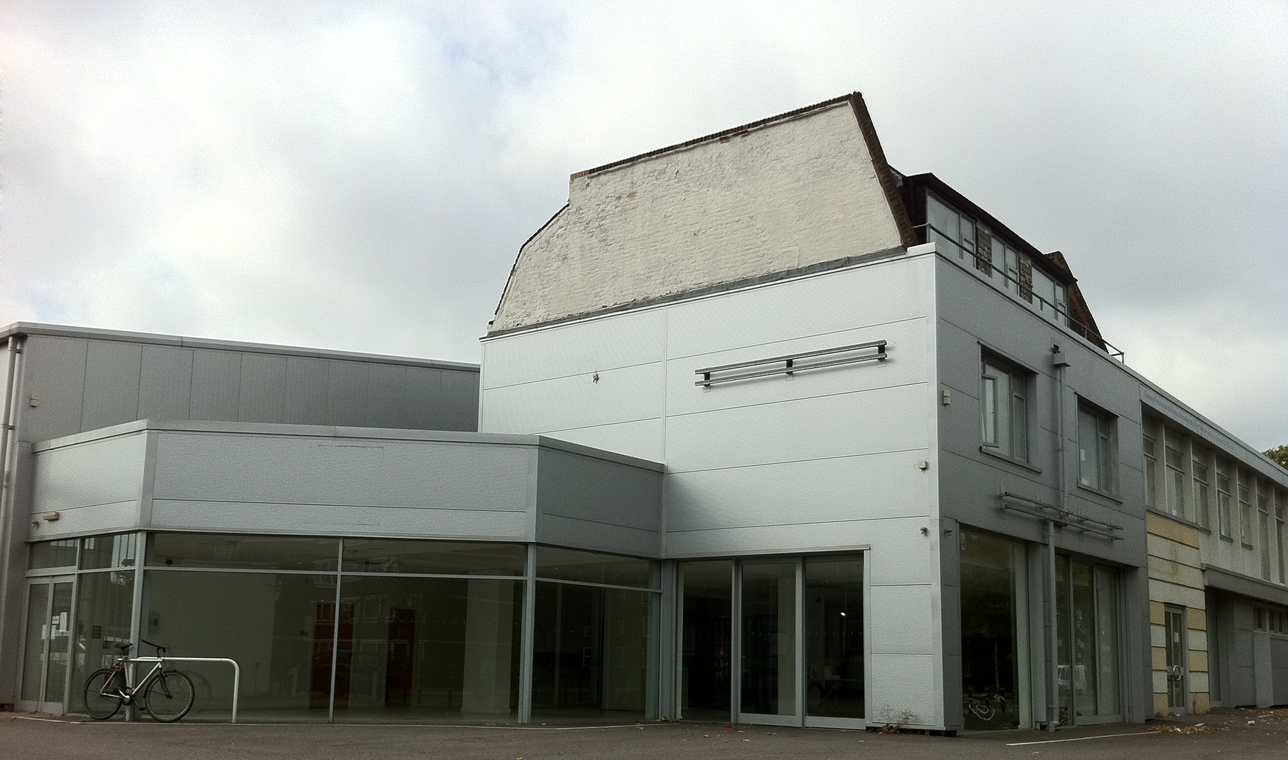
The Peckham gallery in 2011

Auto Italia was founded by artists Kate Cooper, Amanda Dennis and Rachel Pimm in a squatted car garage named ‘auto-italia south east’ in Peckham, South London.

Throughout the history of the organisation, Auto Italia’s programming has questioned how artists can work together to develop new formats for artistic production. This has been explored under a number of guises, with artists at the heart of the organisation exploring the project as an artist, an organisation, a collaboration, a community and a space. This has been developed by an evolving group of collaborating artists. Alumni include Marleen Boschen (2014–16), Amanda Dennis (founding member 2007-2012), Richard John Jones (2009-2012) and Rachel Pimm (founding member 2007-2009).

This work has been developed through a series of temporary spaces in Peckham (2007–12), Kings Cross (2013-15) and its current space in Bethnal Green (2016–present). Since 2012, Auto Italia's has been one of Arts Council England's National Portfolio Organisations. In May 2024, Dr Maggie Matić, a curator and researcher specializing in contemporary feminist, crip, and queer theory, succeeded Edward Gillman as Director of Auto Italia.

== Auto Italia LIVE ==
In 2010 Auto Italia LIVE was launched in collaboration with LuckyPDF with five, one hour long TV episodes performed and broadcast live over the internet and to a studio audience. In September 2011 Auto Italia began a second series of TV shows again performed in front of a live audience and broadcast live online from the space. This series focuses on how television affects expectations and perceptions of culture and public spaces. Artists have been commissioned to produce new work for the shows including soap operas, factual programmes, documentary works, and human and mechanical choreography.

Participating artists include Nathan Budzinski, Benedict Drew, Francisco Pedraglio, Heather Phillipson, Eddie Peake, Andrew Kerton, Leslie Kulesh, Rachel Pimm, and Lorenzo Tebano.
