= Gallowglass (novel) =

1990 novel by Ruth Rendell

- First edition (UK)
- Author: Barbara Vine (Ruth Rendell)
- Language: English
- Genre: Crime / mystery novel
- Publisher: Viking (UK); Harmony (US)
- Publication date: 1 March 1990
- Publication place: United Kingdom
- Media type: Print/audiobook
- Pages: 304
- ISBN: 0-670-83241-3
- OCLC: 24669658
- Preceded by: The House of Stairs
- Followed by: King Solomon's Carpet

Gallowglass is a 1990 novel by the British writer Ruth Rendell, written under the name Barbara Vine.

== Plot summary ==
Sandor comes from a wealthy home and is highly educated. Joe, longing for a friend, falls under his spell.

Some years earlier, Sandor had taken part in the kidnapping of a former model, Nina. He now plans to kidnap her again so that they can live together. At present, Nina lives in a heavily guarded residence with her husband and many servants. Eventually, Joe's colourful stepsister, Tilly, is also dragged into the plot. However, things do not turn out as Sandor had planned. Most of the story is seen through Joe's eyes, but Paul Garnet, Nina's driver, also tells part of the tale.

== Adaptation ==
The novel was adapted by the BBC as part of The Barbara Vine Mysteries. Jacqueline Holborough wrote the screenplay for this version.
