= The Doomsters =

Novel by Ross Macdonald

- First edition
- Author: Ross Macdonald
- Language: English
- Series: Lew Archer
- Genre: Mystery novel
- Publisher: Knopf
- Publication date: 1958
- Publication place: United States
- Media type: Print (Hardcover, Paperback)
- ISBN: 9-997-51958-2
- OCLC: 1376657
- Preceded by: The Barbarous Coast
- Followed by: The Galton Case

The Doomsters is a 1958 mystery novel by American writer Ross Macdonald, the seventh book in his Lew Archer series.

The title is taken from the poem To an Unborn Pauper Child, by Thomas Hardy:

Breathe not, hid Heart: cease silently, / And though thy birth-hour beckons thee, / Sleep the long sleep: The Doomsters heap / Travails and teens around us here / And Time-Wraiths turn our songsingings to fear.

The poem reflects on the difficulty of escaping the lot to which we are born, an underlying theme of Macdonald's book.

== Plot summary ==
Archer is hired by escaped mental patient Carl Hallman to investigate the deaths of his wealthy and influential parents. His mother died in a drowning several years earlier, and his father, a Senator, died more recently. Carl claims to have been sent to a mental hospital by his older brother to prevent him from exposing the family's dark secrets, and escaped to contact Archer. Carl's brother dies in a shooting that is blamed on Carl, and a manhunt for Carl ensues across the family's vast orange orchards and surrounding property. The more Archer investigates, the more suspects he finds for the trio of deaths that haunt the Hallman family.

== Reception ==
Many sources agree that this book marked a turning point in the series, wherein Macdonald abandoned his imitations of Raymond Chandler and Dashiell Hammett and found his own voice. It also marks Lew Archer as a man more interested in understanding the criminal than in catching him. Macdonald described The Doomsters and its successor, The Galton Case (1959), as the books where after a decade as a professional novelist he felt most satisfied with his writing.

Writing in The New York Times, critic Anthony Boucher called the book a study of the "complex strands that shape responsibility and doom," and "an analysis at once compassionate and cruel, giving dimension and meaning to an unusually well paced and characterized puzzle of murder."
