= The Zebra-Striped Hearse =

1962 novel by Ross Macdonald

- First edition
- Author: Ross Macdonald
- Language: English
- Series: Lew Archer
- Genre: Detective, Mystery novel
- Publisher: Knopf
- Publication date: 1962
- Publication place: United States
- Media type: Print (Hardcover, Paperback)
- Preceded by: The Wycherly Woman
- Followed by: The Chill

The Zebra-Striped Hearse is a detective novel written in 1962 by American author Ross Macdonald, the tenth book featuring his private eye, Lew Archer. The Coen Brothers wrote an as-yet-unproduced screenplay based on the novel for Joel Silver.

== Plot ==
Colonel and Mrs. Blackwell hire Archer to investigate their prospective son-in-law, an artist named Burke Damis. Blackwell believes Damis is marrying their daughter Harriet only for her money. Archer takes the case, warning the Blackwells that they must be prepared to accept whatever information he uncovers, good or bad. Soon after beginning his investigation, he finds Blackwell threatening Damis with a gun. Damis and Harriet leave the house and vanish. From there, the search for the runaways takes Archer to San Francisco, Mexico, Nevada, and back to California, finding dead bodies linked to Damis along the way.

Archer repeatedly encounters a group of surfers driving around in a zebra striped hearse, which gives the book its title.

== Reception ==
The Zebra-Striped Hearse was praised by some critics, stating, for example that it had a "fantastic plot" and that "Lew Archer fit into the PI mold while still being his own unique creation". Terry Teachout's appraisal was more negative; he found the Archer books "repetitive and often dully written" and The Zebra-Striped Hearse in particular was "perfectly readable" but marred by "dime-store psychologizing".

James Ellroy has cited his discovery of the book, as a teenager in 1965, as a formative reading experience: "It was the most exultant reading experience of my young life. Ross Macdonald dropped a match and sent me to Cinder City. I discovered the beauty of tragedy. I’m ever the Lutheran choirboy. I caught glimmers of redemption in murderous squalor."

== Adaptation ==
KCRW adapted The Zebra-Striped Hearse for a radio play in 2000.
