= Rover Boys =

Juvenile book series

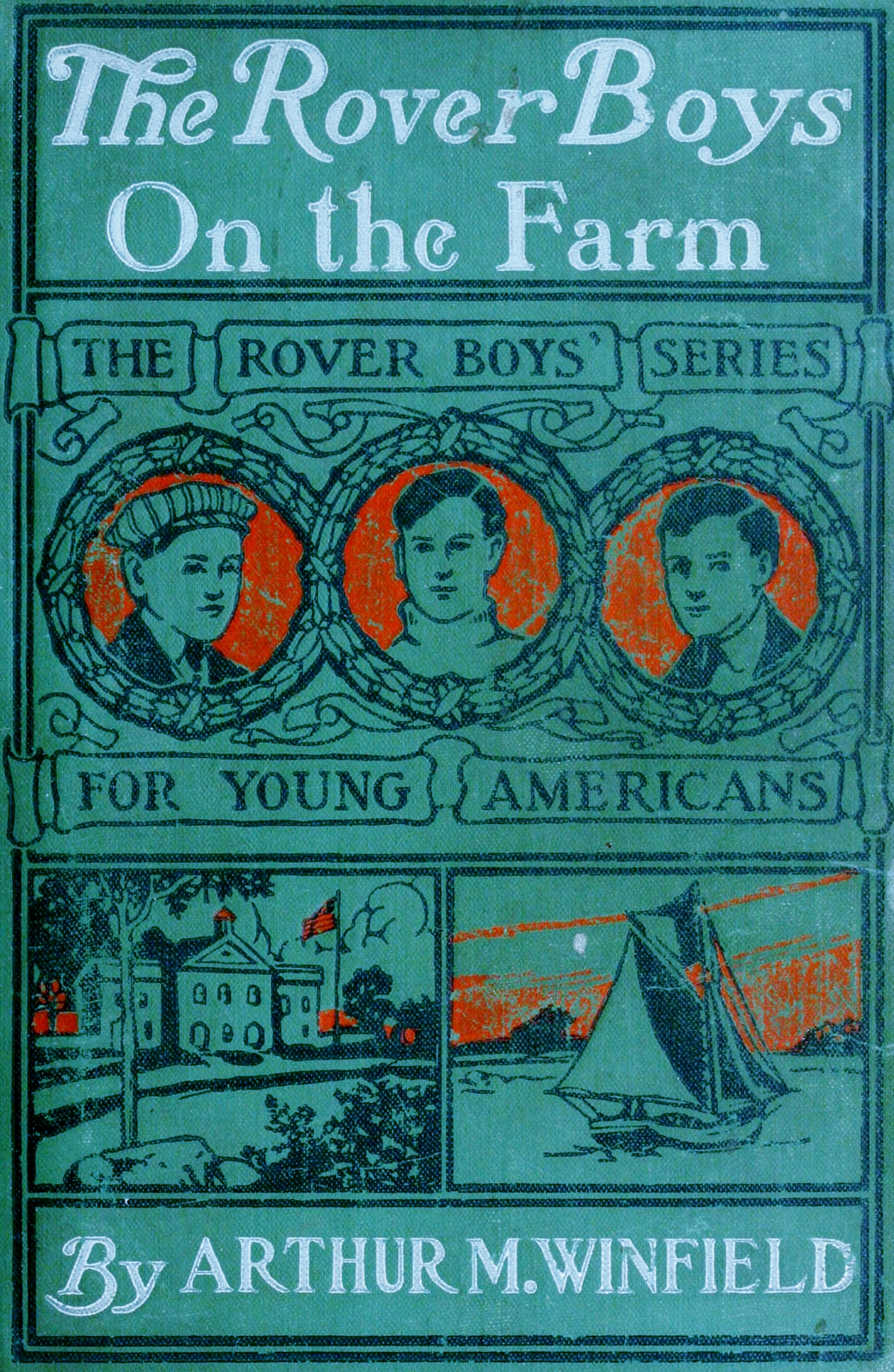
The Rover Boys on the Farm, 1908, first edition cover

The Rover Boys, or The Rover Boys Series for Young Americans, was a popular juvenile series written by Arthur M. Winfield, a pseudonym for Edward Stratemeyer. Thirty titles were published between 1899 and 1926 and the books remained in print for years afterward.

The original Rover Boys were brothers Tom, Sam, and Dick Rover, the sons of wealthy widower Anderson Rover, who entrusted his brother and sister-in-law, Randolph and Martha, with the rearing of the boys. As the series progressed the brothers became smitten with Dora Stanhope and Nellie and Grace Laning, the daughter and nieces of a wealthy widow.

The Rover boys' children (Fred, son of Sam Rover; Jack, son of Dick; Andy and Randy, twin sons of Tom) became the main characters of the "second series" that began with Volume 21, The Rover Boys at Colby Hall, published in 1917. The elder Rovers continued making appearances in the second series.

Additionally, there was a related Putnam Hall series of six books that featured other characters from the first Rovers series, although the Rovers themselves do not appear.

The Rovers were students at a military boarding school: adventurous, prank-playing, flirtatious, and often unchaperoned adolescents who were frequently causing mischief for authorities, as well as for criminals. The series often incorporated modern technology of the era, such as the automobile, airplanes (The Rover Boys in the Air) and news events, such as World War I.

The earliest volumes focused on the boys' travel adventures, but later stories were filled with mystery and suspense.

== Publishers ==
From 1899 to 1906 The Mershon Co. published volumes 1 through 11; from 1906 to 1907 Chatterton-Peck Co. published volumes 1 through 11. Starting in 1907 Grosset & Dunlap began publishing the Rover Boys, eventually printing all 30 volumes. They published the series through at least the 1930s. Starting in the 1940s Whitman Publishing reprinted volumes 1, 2, 7, 8, 10, 11, 13 and 14.

== Legacy ==
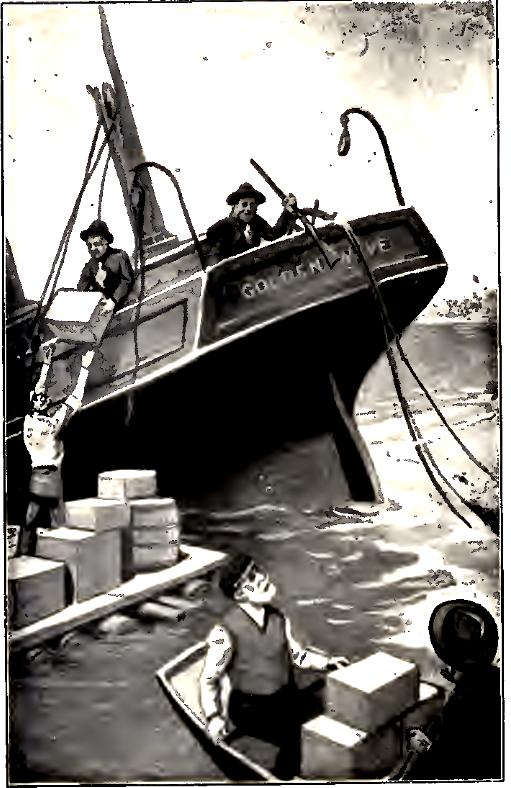
Image appearing on DJVU page 6 (frontispiece) of Rover Boys on Land and Sea. (1903)

More than a million Rover Boys books were sold, and the titles remained in print by Grosset & Dunlap and later Whitman for years after the final title was published. The most commonly encountered are the green and brown cover editions published by Grosset & Dunlap during the 1910s and 1920s. While there are better-known and longer-running juvenile series such as the Hardy Boys, Nancy Drew, and Tom Swift, the Rovers were very successful and influential. They established the template for all later Stratemeyer Syndicate series. It was Stratemeyer's first series, and one of his favorites. Stratemeyer did all of the writing himself, rather than hiring ghostwriters.

- The Rover Boys were parodied in a 1942 Warner Brothers Merrie Melodies cartoon as The Dover Boys, subtitled "The Rivals of Roquefort Hall" (as opposed to Colby, both terms being cheeses). The cartoon was directed by Chuck Jones. The characters from this Rovers' parody would later appear in two episodes of Animaniacs ("Frontier Slappy" and "Magic Time") and its 1999 series finale Wakko's Wish, as well as the 1996 movie Space Jam.
- In the 1951 detective novel The Way Some People Die by Ross MacDonald, a police lieutenant accuses protagonist Lew Archer of running "a murder investigation as a one-man show". He mocks Archer by asking if he read The Rover Boys at Hollywood and Vine.
- In the 1952 movie Macao, starring Robert Mitchum and Jane Russell, the Mitchum character, Nick Cochran, asks "are the Rover Boys still here?", referring to two thugs sent to find him.
- The 18th episode of the first season (1953) of The Adventures of Ozzie and Harriet is titled "Rover Boys", which features a narrative driven by a disagreement between Ozzie and his neighbor Thorny concerning the plot of a Rover Boys story.
- In the 1935 movie Special Agent, the character of Julie Gardner, played by Bette Davis, says to two mobsters who kidnapped her (to prevent her from testifying against crime boss Alexander Carlton, played by Ricardo Cortez) “Never seen you two before. Which one of the Rover Boys are you?”
- In the 1938 movie Letter of Introduction, the character of Barry Paige, played by George Murphy, is accused of being a "Rover Boy" for coming to the rescue of Kay Martin, played by Andrea Leeds, when she found herself in a predicament at a restaurant when she couldn't pay the bill.
- In the 1939 movie Slightly Honorable, there is a reference to morally ambiguous attorney John Webb, played by actor Pat O'Brien, as acting like a "Rover Boy" when he comes to the aid of a young party girl who was being physically assaulted by a drunk man. He responded with "That's what fascinates people. So many sides to my character."
- In the 1955 MGM musical It's Always Fair Weather, there are two references to the Rover Boys. The first is in the beginning of the movie when a bartender exclaims, "Well, if it isn't the Rover Boys" as the three main characters walk into his bar. The second is toward the end of the movie; while trying to evade thugs, the character named Ted borrows a jacket that has "The Rover Boys" embroidered on the back.
- In 1956, a Canadian vocal group named after the Rover Boys had a Top 20 single with the school-themed "Graduation Day".
- The names Tom, Sam, and Dick Rover are mentioned by Scout in Harper Lee's 1960 novel To Kill a Mockingbird in reference to a game of pretend in which Dill, Jem, and Scout all had good parts.
- In a 1965 episode of I Spy called "Carry Me Back to Old Tsing-Tao", Scotty referred to the three money-hungry sons-in-law of an aged Chinese criminal mastermind as "The Rover Boys" by saying, "...Now can the Rover Boys be far behind?"
- The Rover Boys books were mentioned in the 1966 supernatural soap opera Dark Shadows (episode 38), where the governess Victoria Winters was searching for the books in the basement of the old mansion for her charge David Collins.
- In the eighth season of The Andy Griffith Show, in a 1967 episode titled "The Tape Recorder", the bank robber character Eddie Blake complains that his luck was he had to run into the "Rover Boys", when Opie and Arnold asked him to confess his crime because they secretly recorded him in his cell revealing the location of the stolen money.

== Titles ==
1. The Rover Boys at School, or, The Cadets of Putnam Hall - 1899
2. The Rover Boys on the Ocean, or, A Chase for a Fortune - 1899
3. The Rover Boys in the Jungle, or, Stirring Adventures in Africa - 1899
4. The Rover Boys Out West, or, The Search for a Lost Mine - 1900
5. The Rover Boys on the Great Lakes, or, The Secret of the Island Cave - 1901
6. The Rover Boys in the Mountains, or, A Hunt for Fun and Fortune - 1902
7. The Rover Boys on Land and Sea, or, The Crusoes of Seven Islands - 1903
8. The Rover Boys in Camp, or, The Rivals of Pine Island - 1904
9. The Rover Boys on the River, or, The Search for the Missing Houseboat - 1905
10. The Rover Boys on the Plains, or, The Mystery of Red Rock Ranch - 1906
11. The Rover Boys in Southern Waters, or, The Deserted Steam Yacht - 1907
12. The Rover Boys on the Farm, or, Last Days at Putnam Hall - 1908
13. The Rover Boys on Treasure Isle, or, The Strange Cruise of the Steam Yacht - 1909
14. The Rover Boys at College, or, The Right Roads and the Wrong - 1910
15. The Rover Boys Down East, or, The Struggle for the Stanhope Fortune - 1911
16. The Rover Boys in the Air, or, From College Campus to the Clouds - 1912
17. The Rover Boys in New York, or, Saving their Father's Honor - 1913
18. The Rover Boys in Alaska, or, Lost in the Fields of Ice - 1914
19. The Rover Boys in Business, or, The Case of the Missing Bonds - 1915
20. The Rover Boys on a Tour, or, Last Days at Brill College - 1916

Second series
21. The Rover Boys at Colby Hall, or, The Struggles of the Young Cadets - 1917
22. The Rover Boys on Snowshoe Island, or, The Old Lumberman's Treasure Box - 1918
23. The Rover Boys Under Canvas, or, The Mystery of the Wrecked Submarine - 1919
24. The Rover Boys on a Hunt, or, The Mysterious House in the Woods - 1920
25. The Rover Boys in the Land of Luck, or, Stirring Adventures in the Oil Fields - 1921
26. The Rover Boys at Big Horn Ranch, or, The Cowboys' Big Roundup - 1922
27. The Rover Boys at Big Bear Lake, or, The Camps of the Rival Cadets - 1923
28. The Rover Boys Shipwrecked, or, A Thrilling Hunt for Pirates Gold - 1924
29. The Rover Boys on Sunset Trail, or, The Old Miner's Mysterious Message - 1925
30. The Rover Boys Winning a Fortune, or, Strenuous Days Ashore and Afloat - 1926

Putnam Hall series
1. The Putnam Hall Cadets, or, Good Times In School and Out - 1901
2. The Putnam Hall Rivals, or, Fun and Sport Afloat and Ashore - 1906
3. The Putnam Hall Champions, or, Bound to Win Out - 1908
4. The Putnam Hall Rebellion, or, The Rival Runaways - 1909
5. The Putnam Hall Encampment, or, The Secret of the Old Mill - 1910
6. The Putnam Hall Mystery, or, The School Chums Strange Discovery - 1911

All of these books are available for download free at Project Gutenberg and some are available as audiobooks for free at LibriVox.
