= Drowning Pool (disambiguation) =

Drowning Pool may refer to:

- Drowning Pool, a rock band
  - Drowning Pool (album), one of their albums
- The Drowning Pool, a novel by Ross Macdonald
  - The Drowning Pool (film), a 1975 film based on the novel
- "The Drowning Pool" (Baywatch), a 1989 television episode

== See also ==
- Drowning pit
