= The Goodbye Look =

The Goodbye Look may refer to:

- The Goodbye Look, a 1969 novel by Ross Macdonald in the Lew Archer series
- "The Goodbye Look", a 1982 song by Donald Fagen from the album The Nightfly
- "The Goodbye Look", a 1992 episode of the British TV series Perfect Scoundrels
- "The Goodbye Look", a 2005 episode of the British TV series Murphy's Law
- "The Goodbye Look", a 2011 episode of the American TV series Pretty Little Liars
