= The Name Is Archer =

Short story collection by Ross Macdonald

Cover of the 1955 Bantam paperback

The Name Is Archer is a short story collection by the American-Canadian mystery writer Kenneth Millar, who used the pseudonyms John Ross Macdonald and Ross Macdonald. The collection was published by Bantam Books in 1955 and went through multiple reprintings. The stories all feature the Los Angeles-based private detective Lew Archer.

== Background ==
The detective protagonist in Millar's first four novels had gone by various names. It was not until his fifth novel, The Moving Target (1949), that Millar chose "Lew Archer", and the name stuck. In addition to his novels, Millar had begun writing short stories while serving in the U.S. Navy during and after World War II. He entered a short story competition sponsored by Ellery Queen's Mystery Magazine. "Death by Air" won fourth prize, worth $300, and was published by the magazine in June 1946. In the late 1940s and '50s, Millar continued contributing Lew Archer stories to pulp magazines. In each story, the detective at one point identifies himself by saying, "The name is Archer", which became the character's trademark phrase.

== Publishing ==
In 1955, Bantam Books published seven of Millar's works of short fiction under the title, The Name Is Archer, by John Ross Macdonald. Over the next two decades, Bantam brought out numerous reprint editions of The Name Is Archer, using the shortened pseudonym Ross Macdonald.

Two more Archer stories—"Midnight Blue" published in Ed McBain's Mystery Book in October 1960, and "Sleeping Dog" published in Argosy in April 1965—were added to the original seven for the 1977 anthology, Lew Archer: Private Investigator, with a new Introduction by Ross Macdonald.

== Contents ==
The seven stories that appeared in The Name Is Archer (1955) were:

- "Find the Woman" (titled "Death by Air" in Ellery Queen's Mystery Magazine, June 1946), by Kenneth Millar
- "The Bearded Lady", (American Magazine, October 1948), by Kenneth Millar
- "Gone Girl" (titled "Imaginary Blonde" in Manhunt, February 1953), by Kenneth Millar
- "The Sinister Habit" (titled "The Guilty Ones" in Manhunt, May 1953), by John Ross Macdonald
- "The Suicide" (titled "The Beat-Up Sister" in Manhunt, October 1953), by John Ross Macdonald
- "Guilt-Edged Blonde" (Manhunt, January 1954), by John Ross Macdonald
- "Wild Goose Chase" (Ellery Queen's Mystery Magazine, July 1954), by John Ross Macdonald

In the "Death by Air" short story, the private detective hired to locate a missing Hollywood starlet is named Joe Rogers. For The Name Is Archer anthology, the story was retitled "Find the Woman" and the detective renamed Lew Archer. When the story was adapted in 1958 for the CBS television series Pursuit, Macdonald insisted on using the character's original name of Joe Rogers, and the episode was called "Epitaph for a Golden Girl".

At the time he wrote "Death by Air", Macdonald was under the influence of Raymond Chandler and modeled his private detective after Philip Marlowe, "a cultured man with a healthy sense of humor". The story's first two pages are packed with literary and cultural allusions. The narrator has recently been discharged from the Navy: "I was all dressed up in civilian clothes with no place to go," he explains, adapting to his circumstances a song from 1913, "When You're All Dressed Up and No Place to Go". In walks his first client, the smartly turned-out Millicent Dreen: "My hair is hennaed but comely, said her coiffure", adapting in this case the Biblical "I am black, but comely, O ye daughters of Jerusalem" from the Song of Songs - a statement "inviting not to conviction but to suspension of disbelief". The concept of suspending disbelief was discussed in Samuel Taylor Coleridge's Biographia Literaria (Millar wrote his Ph.D. thesis on Coleridge), but is borrowed from Aristotle's literary theory, and is the first of three successive references in the story to ancient Greek literature.

Millicent Dreen provides the next allusion when she remarks that "apron strings don't become me", adapting the title of the recent play-cycle Mourning Becomes Electra, which Eugene O’Neill had based on the Oresteia of Aeschylus. The narrator later caps this with a dramatic allusion of his own: "Una Sand meant less to me than Hecuba". In this case he is referring to Hamlet's question, "What's Hecuba to him, or he to Hecuba, / That he should weep for her?" Behind the history of Hecuba, however, lies her story as dramatised by Euripides in The Trojan Women. Cultural references were a common part of Macdonald's future work, though not quite in such concentrated form as here.

Cultural references, but now to works of art, appeared in Macdonald's next published short fiction, "The Bearded Lady". The story revolves around a stolen painting by Jean-Baptiste-Siméon Chardin, supposedly of a boy in a blue waistcoat looking at an apple. Within two pages, mention of this is followed by a reference to a jungle "scene by Le Douanier Rousseau". Later, Mr. Hendryx’s bodyguard is described as "sitting in a Thinker pose", alluding to the sculpture by Auguste Rodin. Macdonald had initially meant the story to simply be a money-generating piece of formula writing, and he considered it "very bad". The detective was named Sam Drake (the lead character of his novel Trouble Follows Me), and the action was set in San Marcos, a place "surrounded by the mountains that walled the city off from the desert in the north-east", which was patterned after Santa Barbara, the California city where Millar and his wife had relocated. When Millar revised the story for the Bantam anthology, a fistfight with the bodyguard replaced its romantic sub-plot and Drake's name was changed to Archer.

The title of another story, "Guilt-Edged Blonde", puns on the phrase gilt-edged bond. As the shortest in the collection, it was the one most often reprinted, for example, in Bloodhound Detective Story Magazine (May 1962) and Ellery Queen's Mystery Magazine (February 1974), as well as in crime fiction anthologies, beginning with the Mystery Writers of America collection, A Choice of Murders (1958). There have been two film adaptations: "Guilt-Edged Blonde", a black-and-white short from Cape Town International Film School, won the 2002 Stone Award. The French full-length feature adaptation, Le loup de la côte ouest (West Coast Wolf, 2002), did less well.

"Gone Girl" was first printed in February 1953 in the New York magazine Manhunt, a venture aiming "to combine the hard-boiled style of classic pulps with the commercial appeal of Spillane". Macdonald would go on to publish several more Lew Archer stories in Manhunt.

== Additional Lew Archer stories ==
After Macdonald's death, his biographer Tom Nolan discovered among his papers three unpublished Lew Archer stories, and published them as Strangers in Town (Crippen & Landru, 2001):

1. "Death by Water", also featuring Joe Rogers, a companion piece to "Death by Air". Macdonald never used it because he considered its plot too similar to "Death by Air".
2. "Strangers in Town", written in 1950 and expanded into the novel The Ivory Grin (1952). Elements from "Strangers in Town", including verbatim conversations, names of characters, and the theme of an elderly gangster's gun moll, were recycled in Macdonald's next piece of magazine short fiction, "Gone Girl", which was published after The Ivory Grin.
3. "The Angry Man", written in 1955. Macdonald opted to use it as the basis for his 1958 novel The Doomsters.

Macdonald's notebooks contained a number of other Lew Archer story fragments, possible opening scenes for novels, etc., all of which had been written during the period 1952–65. Nolan included these writings in a section titled "Case Notes" in the 2007 collection, The Archer Files.

== Bibliography ==
- Nolan, Tom (1999). Ross Macdonald: A Biography. New York: Scribner. ISBN 978-0684812175.
