= The Drowning Pool (film) =

1975 film by Stuart Rosenberg

- Theatrical release poster
- Directed by: Stuart Rosenberg
- Screenplay by: Tracy Keenan Wynn; Lorenzo Semple Jr. Walter Hill
- Based on: The Drowning Pool (1950 novel) by Ross Macdonald
- Produced by: David Foster; Lawrence Turman
- Starring: Paul Newman; Joanne Woodward; Anthony Franciosa
- Cinematography: Gordon Willis
- Edited by: John C. Howard
- Music by: Michael Small
- Production company: First Artists
- Distributed by: Warner Bros. Pictures
- Release dates: June 18, 1975 (New Orleans); July 25, 1975 (U.S.)
- Running time: 109 minutes
- Country: United States
- Language: English
- Budget: $2.7 million
- Box office: $2.6 million (US and Canada rentals)

The Drowning Pool is a 1975 American neo-noir mystery thriller film directed by Stuart Rosenberg and starring Paul Newman, Joanne Woodward, and Anthony Franciosa. It is the sequel to the 1966 film Harper, and is adapted by Tracy Keenan Wynn, Lorenzo Semple Jr., and Walter Hill from Ross Macdonald's 1950 novel. In the film, private investigator Lew Harper (Newman) travels to Louisiana to help his wealthy former lover (Woodward) escape a blackmailer, but is caught up in a scheme by an oil baron.

The film was released by Warner Bros. on July 25, 1975. Unlike its predecessor, The Drowning Pool received mixed reviews and was a commercial disappointment, though was nominated for an Edgar Allan Poe Award for Best Motion Picture Screenplay.

== Plot ==
Lew Harper, a private investigator from Los Angeles, flies to Louisiana to do a job for Iris Devereaux, with whom he'd had a memorable six-day fling, six years earlier. She believes her family's ex-chauffeur, Pat Reavis, is blackmailing her with the knowledge that she cheated on her closeted husband James. James does not care but her tyrannical mother-in-law, Olivia, torments her. Harper is propositioned by Iris's teenaged daughter, Schuyler, and attracts the attention of Police Chief Broussard and Lieutenant Franks. Franks in particular displays a deep-felt personal interest in the Devereaux family.

Oil magnate J. Hugh Kilbourne thinks Harper might be useful in taking ownership of Olivia's oil-rich properties, which she refuses to sell. Harper is abducted by two hoods working for Kilbourne, but Kilbourne releases him after realizing Harper won't help. Olivia has been murdered in the meantime. Harper searches for Reavis, the prime suspect, and is abducted again, this time by hoods working for Kilbourne's wife, Mavis, who demands an account book documenting her husband's illicit dealings.

Harper tracks down Reavis, who denies involvement in the murder of Olivia and the blackmailing of Iris, claiming his presence at Olivia's death was because of an affair with Schuyler. Reavis promises that information he's holding will yield a lot of money for both of them but the car they're riding in is forced off the road by masked gunmen who kill Reavis in a gunfight. Broussard tells Harper no report was made to the police and Franks has been injured in a "hunting accident."

Iris begs Harper to give up the case and he correctly deduces that Reavis gave the account book to his girlfriend Gretchen. Harper ambushes Franks and forces him to admit he works for Kilbourne. Harper then confronts Kilbourne who confesses to hiring Reavis, but only to spy on Olivia, not kill her. Kilbourne offers Harper a fortune for the account book, but Harper refuses. When Franks arrives to visit he is killed by Kilbourne's trained dogs.

Harper is again abducted by Kilbourne, bound and left with Mavis in an abandoned sanitarium. He refuses to turn over the account book and Kilbourne has them tortured before abandoning them in a hydrotherapy room. Harper floods the room, intending to float through the skylight, but the pair are instead trapped in the pool and down to their last breaths when the door opens and Mavis rescues them, killing Kilbourne in the process.

Harper discovers Iris has committed suicide and Broussard reveals they had had an affair seventeen years earlier. Harper confronts Schuyler and lays out how she engineered the entire situation, making her criminally liable. Schuyler insists that "they really did a job on" her father before admitting that she hated both Iris and Olivia. Harper reveals Broussard has been listening to their conversation. Broussard slaps Schuyler but lets her go, confirming he is her real father. Harper visits Gretchen, giving her what's left of Reavis's money, less his expenses, and tells her to send the account book to "the biggest newspaper in New Orleans."

== Cast ==
- Paul Newman as Lew Harper
- Joanne Woodward as Iris Devereaux
- Richard Derr as James Devereaux
- Anthony Franciosa as Chief Broussard
- Murray Hamilton as J.Hugh Kilbourne
- Gail Strickland as Mavis Kilbourne
- Melanie Griffith as Schuyler Devereaux
- Linda Haynes as Gretchen
- Andre Trottier as Hydrotherapist
- Richard Jaeckel as Lieutenant Franks
- Paul Koslo as Candy
- Joe Canutt as Glo
- Andrew Robinson as Pat Reavis
- Coral Browne as Olivia Devereaux
- Helena Kallianiotes as Elaine Reavis

== Production ==
=== Development ===
In 1966, a film was made of another Lew Archer novel The Moving Target called Harper, starring Paul Newman. The character of Archer was renamed Lew Harper for the film. It was based on a script by William Goldman, who then wrote a follow-up Archer adaptation, based on The Chill, but that film was never made.

In April 1973, producers David Foster and Lawrence Turman announced they had optioned the rights to the novel The Drowning Pool for director Robert Mulligan and had hired Walter Hill to adapt it.

At the time the film was being made, Paramount was producing a TV series based on the Lew Archer novels starring Brian Keith. Part of the deal meant that Foster & Turman couldn't use the character name "Lew Archer" in their film, although this proved a moot point since Harper had already renamed the character.

=== Writing and casting ===
Hill did a draft, saying he "tried to toughen up the material and put a little more muscle in Lew Archer's pants, which was probably a mistake. Certainly, the studio and the producers ended up feeling that way; their main criticism was MacDonald's fans don't respond to physical action. They may have been right, but I thought going in the direction they wanted with the script was a highway to dullsville." Hill said this prompted him to "more or less jump ship" to go and make his directorial debut Hard Times. Hill says that when he became involved, Paul Newman was not attached to the film, and that when Hill left the project, so did Mulligan.

Eventually, Paul Newman agreed to star. This meant the film was co-produced by First Artists at Warner Bros. Pictures. By July 1974, Newman's wife Joanne Woodward had agreed to co-star and Lorenzo Semple had rewritten the script. Woodward suggested to relocate the story from California to Louisiana, as she felt it would offer a point of difference from its predecessor.

Originally, the plan was to rename the lead character Dave Ryan to disassociate the film from Harper, and title the film Ryan's the Name. Then a few weeks before preproduction, it was decided by Foster that it was "foolish to make this change" and the character ended up being called Lew Harper. Newman said, "a character like Harper is very easy. It's great fun to get up in the morning and play Harper."

By September 1974, Tracy Keenan Wynn, who had earned a strong reputation writing TV movies, was working on the screenplay. Hill said that later Eric Roth did some writing on it. Jack Garfein said his agent pitched Garfein to direct the movie and Newman was agreeable, but then Stuart Rosenberg approached Newman asking for the job, saying he was going through personal problems and was "desperate" for the job, so Newman chose Rosenberg. This was the fourth and final collaboration between Rosenberg and Newman.

=== Filming ===
The film was shot in late 1974. Location filming occurred in Lake Charles, Lafayette, Franklin and New Orleans. The scenes at the Deveraux's "Beau Rivage" estate were shot at Oaklawn Manor near Franklin. The "drowning pool" sequence was shot on a set at Warner Brothers' Burbank studios, using a sound-stage specially designed for water-heavy sets.

Before the movie came out, a film buyer said, "You're sure it's going to be a disaster because Stuart Rosenberg — ooh! What has Stuart Rosenberg got on Paul Newman? I mean, after WUSA, how could anyone...? This man has got to be the Otto Preminger of grade-B movies. He just hasn't made a commercial movie in years, and people still give him big properties." Hill later estimated that only two minor scenes in the film were true to his adaptation and said he "wasn't too crazy about the movie."

The voiceover for the trailer was done by Lynda Carter, a rarity for a female actress.

=== Music ===
The film score was written by Michael Small. The score heavily incorporates the 1971 popular song, "Killing Me Softly with His Song", as an instrumental rendition.

== Release ==
The Drowning Pool premiered at the Saenger Theatre in New Orleans on June 18 , 1975, as a gala benefit for the Policemen’s Association of New Orleans.

=== Home media ===
The Drowning Pool was released on November 14, 2006, as part of the Paul Newman Collection DVD box set. The film made its Blu-ray debut via the Warner Archive Collection in 2018.

== Reception ==
=== Box office ===
The film was a box-office disappointment in the United States and Canada, earning rentals of $2.6 million against a budget of $2.7 million, failing to recoup negative and promotional costs. However, it performed better abroad — especially in Italy, France, Spain and South Africa — earning $8 million worldwide.

=== Critical response ===
A. H. Weiler of The New York Times said in the review: "Under Stuart Rosenberg's muscular but pedestrian direction, the script, adapted from (Ross Macdonald's) 1950 novel, transports our hero from his native California to present-day New Orleans and its bayou environs. ... Of course, Mr. Newman's Harper survives beatings, traps, and a variety of enticing offers with quips, charm, and inherent decency projected in underplayed, workman-like style. If his performance is not outstanding, it is a shade more convincing than the characterizations of the other principals, who emerge as odd types and not as fully fleshed, persuasive individuals. ... Unfortunately, the performances and such authentic facets as Cajun talk, bayous, New Orleans and an imposing, white-pillared, antebellum mansion set amid wide lawns and ancient live oaks, serve only to make The Drowning Pool a mildly interesting diversion."

Roger Ebert gave the film two out of four stars. He wrote that the basic premise of The Drowning Pool was "straightforward thriller material, and could have made a decent B movie, but since The Drowning Pool is a Paul Newman vehicle, it goes first class, and that turns out to be fatal. So much attention is given to making the movie look good visually that the story gets mislaid."

Stanley Kauffmann of The New Republic described The Drowning Pool as a "rotten thriller".

=== Awards and nominations ===
The film was nominated for the Edgar Allan Poe Award for Best Motion Picture Screenplay.

== See also ==
- List of American films of 1975
