= Meet Me at the Morgue =

- first edition cover
- Author: Ross Macdonald
- Language: English
- Publication date: 1953

Meet Me at the Morgue is the ninth novel completed by Ross Macdonald. Credited at the time to John Ross Macdonald, it was published in 1953 by A. A. Knopf and released as a paperback by Pocket Books the following year. In that year too the book was published by Cassell & Co in the UK under the title Experience with Evil. There had been disagreement over the novel's original title. Knopf turned down Macdonald's suggestion of Message from Hell and Macdonald turned down the suggestion of The Convenient Corpse from Pocket Books.

== Plot ==
As Howard Cross, head of the county probation service, is on his way to work, he is introduced to four-year-old Jamie Johnson by the family chauffeur, Fred Miner. Miner, a navy veteran from World War 2, is now on probation after running down an unknown man while driving under the influence of alcohol. Shortly after the two leave, Cross learns from Amy Miner that a ransom note has been delivered to the Johnsons at their Pacific Point home and her husband is suspected of being part of a kidnapping plot.

The boy's father leaves a suitcase containing $50,000 at the city railway station and Cross decides to investigate so as to exonerate Miner from blame. He manages to pick up the trail of the crook who collected the suitcase, only to discover him murdered in his car. When the victim's body is taken to the morgue, no one can identify him, but Cross' assistant Ann Devon believes she had seen him some months before, talking to the Johnson family lawyer, Larry Seifel.

Although the FBI have now been called in, Cross leaves for Los Angeles to follow up clues to the identity of the murdered man. Eventually Cross finds that he was Art Lemp and had been an associate of Kerry Snow, the previously unidentified hit and run victim. Snow had served on the same ship as Miner during the war and had been imprisoned as a deserter in 1946 following information furnished by a red-haired woman. Suspicion for this falls on Helen Johnson, Jamie's mother, and the possibility arises that the kidnapping was an act of revenge on her, with Miner abetting.

Helen believes that Miner may have taken Jamie to a desert cabin that the family own. After the boy is discovered there unharmed, Miner tries to escape by car and is killed when he wrecks it. There remains the question of what has happened to the ransom money and who killed Art Lemp. It emerges that Miner's wife, who also worked for the Johnsons, had dyed her hair red in the past. Now she is heading for her old home in San Diego. Cross manages to arrive first in a radio car driven by Sam Dressen from the sheriff's office.

Amy had posted the money to her father's house and makes a confession after her arrest there. It was she who had informed on Snow after having an affair with him in the past, and then killed him when he returned for revenge. Later she had tailed Lemp and murdered him as well. It was only due to the circumstance that she had been held in jail as an accessory after the fact that she had not been able to make her escape earlier.

== The novel ==
The novel was written during 1952 at a period when Macdonald used a wheelchair due to gout. As well as its hardback and paperback publication, it was reissued by the Mystery Guild Book Club and condensed for serialisation in Cosmopolitan. But Pocket Books had complained that the characters lacked the "contrast between good and evil, so noticeable in Chandler's books" and wondered whether Knopf's experts could "somehow sharpen both the characters and the action". Macdonald responded that "I can write a sample of the ordinary hard-boiled mystery with my eyes closed" but wants to do something different, based on relationships; he believes that in this novel his own "characters are more human than in anything I've done, closer to life".

Meet Me at the Morgue had been preceded by the first four in the Lew Archer detective series. In this case the formula is varied to make the protagonist a probation officer who plays a leading part in the investigation. Macdonald even wondered whether his alternative hero might be material for a television series. The book was later classified as a novel of mystery and suspense.

Macdonald also featured in the story an element of the imaginary Southern California that he created over the course of his writing. Here it is the coastal city of Pacific Point that had first appeared in The Way Some People Die (1951). Sometimes identified as based on La Jolla, it is introduced in an early chapter as viewed from above, with Catalina Island in the distance. "I could see the curved spit of land that gave the city its name, half enclosing the oval blue lagoon. The harbour and the sea beyond it were flecked with sails." Afterwards the place went on to figure in several other novels.
