= Black Money (novel) =

1966 novel by Ross Macdonald

- First edition (publ. Knopf)
- Author: Ross Macdonald
- Publisher: Knopf
- Publication date: 1966

Black Money is a 1966 novel by American mystery writer Ross Macdonald, first published by Knopf. It is among the most powerful of all Ross Macdonald's novels and was his own personal choice as his best book.

== Plot summary ==
The plot is typically intricate: Peter Jamiesen, the jilted boyfriend of the formerly wealthy Virginia Fablon, hires sleuth Lew Archer to investigate the background of Francis Martel, a man of mysterious wealth, grandiose claims, and violent threats. Fablon and Martel quickly wed after Archer's arrival. The resulting inquiries take Archer from the homeless to the wealthy, a canvassing seen in other Macdonald novels. Archer links Martel and Fablon to old gambling debts and a suicide that might have been murder.

Except for brief forays into Las Vegas (the title refers to cash skimmed by casino operators to avoid taxes) and the environs of Los Angeles, the action takes place around Montevista. A wealthy enclave, Montevista is characterized by private clubs, opulent homes and exclusive medical clinics. The plot's implications, however, reach beyond California, as the edges of the story extend to Central America and Europe, whose cultures and economies the book sees as inextricably tied to American life.

== Style ==
Macdonald commented on his novel that he had spent some twenty years thinking about and taking notes for Black Money. It was "the longest I have held a book in mind before I wrote it". He also mentioned as formative influences his visit to Panama as a seaman in 1946 and F. Scott Fitzgerald's The Great Gatsby (1925); it is no accident that Fitzgerald is mentioned once in the text itself. Matthew Bruccoli draws a parallel between the themes of Fitzgerald there and Macdonald's novel. The poor boy whose love for a 'golden girl' inspires him to try and raise himself to her level, at times by dubious means; and beyond that "the effect of money, both on those who have it and those who, for whatever reasons, want it".
