= The Dark Tunnel =

1944 crime novel by Kenneth Millar

- First-edition book cover
- Author: Kenneth Millar
- Genre: Crime; mystery; spy
- Publisher: Dodd, Mead & Co.
- Publication date: 1944
- Publication place: United States
- Media type: Print

The Dark Tunnel is the first novel by Kenneth Millar. The first edition was published by Dodd, Mead & Co. in 1944 New York; in January 2020, a fine-condition copy was priced at US$8,500 (equivalent to about $10,600 in 2025). Millar's biography describes The Dark Tunnel as "a hybrid of old-fashioned puzzle-mystery, Buchanesque spy adventure, and Chandleresque exposé of sexual perversion. Because of the latter, a 1950 paperback reprint was subtitled "The story of a homosexual spy".

As an author, Millar was influenced by John Buchan and Raymond Chandler, with The Dark Tunnel bearing a strong resemblance to The Thirty-Nine Steps, and echoing Chandler's hallmarks of "rough-and-ready humor, its extravagant similes, and its more lurid events and descriptions".

Millar's protagonist is Professor Robert Branch, a dichotomous character heavily influenced by the Professor Millar himself. Branch has studied T. S. Eliot, W. C. Handy, Norse mythology, and William Shakespeare; Branch is skilled in lock picking, athletic, and possesses a Doctor of Philosophy.
