= Harper (film) =

1966 film by Jack Smight

- Theatrical release poster
- Directed by: Jack Smight
- Screenplay by: William Goldman
- Based on: The Moving Target by Ross Macdonald
- Produced by: Jerry Gershwin; Elliott Kastner
- Starring: Paul Newman; Lauren Bacall; Julie Harris; Arthur Hill; Janet Leigh; Pamela Tiffin; Robert Wagner; Shelley Winters
- Cinematography: Conrad Hall
- Edited by: Stefan Arnsten
- Music by: Johnny Mandel
- Production company: Gershwin-Kastner Productions
- Distributed by: Warner Bros. Pictures
- Release date: February 23, 1966
- Running time: 121 minutes
- Country: United States
- Language: English
- Budget: $3.5 million
- Box office: $12 million

Harper is a 1966 American neo-noir mystery thriller film directed by Jack Smight from a screenplay by William Goldman, based on the 1949 novel The Moving Target by Ross Macdonald. It stars Paul Newman as private investigator Lew Harper (renamed from the novel's Lew Archer), who is tasked with finding a missing multimillionaire. The cast also features Lauren Bacall, Julie Harris, Arthur Hill, Janet Leigh, Pamela Tiffin, Robert Wagner and Shelley Winters.

The film was released by Warner Bros. Pictures on February 23, 1966, and was both a critical and commercial success. Goldman received a 1967 Edgar Award for Best Motion Picture Screenplay. A sequel, The Drowning Pool, was released in 1975, with Newman reprising his role.

== Plot ==
Private investigator Lew Harper is retained by an old pal, attorney Albert Graves, to search for Graves' employer, multi-millionaire Ralph Sampson. He has disappeared after flying into Los Angeles, and Sampson's physically disabled wife Elaine wants to ensure her estranged husband is not squandering the fortune she hopes to inherit. Harper interviews Allan Taggert, Sampson's private pilot, and his flirtatious daughter Miranda, object of Albert's desire. An old photo of a glamorous starlet in Sampson's bungalow leads Harper to Fay Estabrook, now an aging alcoholic. Harper gets her drunk to see if she is connected to Sampson's disappearance. When she passes out, he encounters the armed Dwight Troy, Fay's husband, who falls for Harper's cover story that he is a fan of the former star.

Having intercepted a call at Fay's, Harper tracks down Betty Fraley, a lounge singer, at her club. When he asks about the missing Sampson, she recognizes his voice and has the bouncer, Puddler, take him out to beat him in a back alley, but Taggert arrives and knocks Puddler unconscious. Taggert joins Harper as they head back to Troy's house to check on the truck Betty warned Fay to head off on the phone. Harper leaves Taggert standing watch outside; though the truck gets away when Taggert shoots at it and misses, it leaves distinctive tire marks in the dust.

Elaine receives a message from Sampson asking her to cash in $500,000 in bonds, and Harper deduces that he has been kidnapped. Driving to a remote mountaintop property that Sampson previously had given to Claude, a bogus holy man, for his cult's temple, Harper evades attempts to distract him and finds the familiar tire prints.

Back at the Sampson estate, Harper finds a ransom note with instructions to drop the cash that night outside town. Harper sends Taggert and Graves to make the drop while he keeps watch. During it, the man picking up the money is shot dead, and the cash is taken by someone in a white convertible. A clue leads Harper to a seedy bar where Harper learns the dead man was Eddie, a regular customer. Outside, Harper spots Puddler driving the same truck, which he follows back to Claude's temple. There, he uncovers an illegal immigrant smuggling operation run by Troy. Harper is caught and questioned by Troy, who knows nothing of the kidnapping or Eddie's part in it, but realizes the white convertible belongs to Betty.

Puddler takes Harper to a dockside warehouse, where he falls to his death failing to prevent Harper's escape. Harper suspects it was Taggert, Betty, and her brother Eddie who kidnapped Sampson. When questioned, Taggert pulls a gun on Harper but is shot by the arriving Graves. Harper then finds junkie Betty at her cottage being tortured by Troy, Claude, and Fay. As Betty reveals where the money is, Harper bursts in, shoots Troy, and subdues the others before fleeing with Betty. When Harper informs her that Taggert, her secret lover, is dead, she breaks down and reveals that Sampson is being held in an abandoned oil tanker. Harper calls Graves to meet them there, but as Harper searches the ship, he is knocked unconscious from behind. Some time later Harper comes to, and the pair discover Sampson's murdered body. Meanwhile, Betty drives off in Harper's car, is pursued by Harper and Graves, and dies when she loses control on a winding road.

The two men retrieve the money and Graves drives Harper to the Sampson home. On the way, Harper tells Graves he knows that he killed Sampson. Graves admits he did because of his hatred for him and knowing that Sampson would oppose any relationship with Miranda. Harper warns Graves that he has to turn him in to the police and that Graves will have to shoot him to stop him. However, when Harper gets out and walks toward the door, he drops the bundle containing the half million dollars in cash to the ground. Graves cannot bring himself to pull the trigger, and Harper raises his arms in resignation.

== Cast ==
- Paul Newman as Lew Harper
- Lauren Bacall as Elaine Sampson
- Julie Harris as Betty Fraley
- Arthur Hill as Albert Graves
- Janet Leigh as Susan Harper
- Pamela Tiffin as Miranda Sampson
- Robert Wagner as Allan Taggert
- Robert Webber as Dwight Troy
- Shelley Winters as Fay Estabrook
- Harold Gould as Sheriff Spanner
- Roy Jenson as Puddler
- Strother Martin as Claude
- Martin West as deputy
- Jacqueline deWit as Mrs. Kronberg
- Eugene Iglesias as Felix
- Richard Carlyle as Fred Platt
- Tom Steele as Eddie Rossiter (uncredited)

== Production ==
=== Development ===
William Goldman had written the novel Boys and Girls Together (1964), the film rights to which had been optioned by producer Elliot Kastner. Kastner met with Goldman and expressed a desire to make a tough movie, one "with balls". Goldman suggested the Lew Archer novels of Ross Macdonald would be ideal—Goldman had long been an admirer of Macdonald, saying the Archer books were "the finest series of detective novels ever written by an American" and that Macdonald was "one of the best American novelists now operating, and he keeps getting better."

Goldman offered to do an adaptation. Kastner agreed, saying he would option whatever of the novels Goldman suggested. Goldman chose The Moving Target, Archer's first. Kastner later said he paid Macdonald $1,000 for the film rights and Goldman $5,000 to write the script.

According to Goldman, the script was offered first to Frank Sinatra, who turned it down, then to Paul Newman, who was eager to accept as he had just starred in the period film fiasco Lady L (1965), and was keen to do something contemporary. Newman's signing was announced in March 1965. Kastner set up the film at Warner Bros. for a budget of $3.3 million, of which Kastner received $500,000.

The script originally was called Archer. The name of the lead character was changed from Lew Archer to Harper because the producers had not bought the rights to the series, just to The Moving Target. Goldman later wrote, "So we needed a different name and Harper seemed OK, the guy harps on things, it's essentially what he does for a living." Newman also requested that the character's name be changed from Archer to Harper due to his success in two films beginning with the letter "H"—The Hustler (1961) and Hud (1963). The film's title remained The Moving Target outside North America.

"It's a Bogie kind of film", Newman said, adding the difference in the private eye character "is the level of commitment. He has more of a sense of humor about his job."

=== Director ===
Goldman said the film was originally offered to a director who was engaged in a legal fight with Warners. The job eventually went to Jack Smight, then-known then for his TV work, who had recently signed a six-picture deal with Warner Bros. The Third Day (1965) was the first and Harper was to be the second.

According to Smight, Newman had admired some of the director's work for live TV. The director met with Newman, discussed the script, and received the star's approval. In contrast with his first two features, Smight loved the script for Harper.

Smight later said, "Attempting a private eye story at the height of all these Bonds could have been a risky business. We wanted to capture some of the qualities of Double Indemnity and all those earlier Raymond Chandlers and Hammetts – in other words to do a really good movie – without being accused of retrogressing. I studied some of those pictures to see what made them tick. One great thing they had going for them was that the character people were so visually explicit: When Peter Lorre or Sydney Greenstreet walked in on Bogart, you didn't need an explanation. Today it's harder to find them; they just aren't being developed in the way they used to be."

Smight asked for and was granted rehearsal time for the film.

Robert Wagner later recalled Smight "lacked confidence; his wife was with him on the set for the entire shoot and seemed to function as a kind of security blanket. That was annoying, because a film set derives its specific temperature from the star and the director. Our director was nervous, which can make the cast and crew nervous. But Paul pretended not to notice, and his confidence spread to the rest of the cast. The reason he was confident was because William Goldman's script was tight and amusing, and the cast kept things bubbling."

=== Filming ===
Principal photography began on June 7, 1965, on the Warner Bros. Studios lot in Burbank, California, and concluded on August 20 of that year. Filming took place on 23 locations in the Los Angeles area, including Malibu Canyon, Marion Davies' former mansion in Beverly Hills, the Moon Fire Temple in Topanga Canyon, Westwood, Bel Air, Trancas Beach in Malibu, Wrigley Field in Los Angeles, Newhall, San Pedro, Terminal Island, and the Huntington Beach oil fields.

In the title sequence, Harper dunks his head into a sinkful of ice cubes to rouse himself awake, a bit that Newman repeated in the 1973 film The Sting. Newman reportedly followed this routine every morning in real life.

== Reception ==
=== Box office ===
Harper was a financial success and earned $5.3 million in North American rentals in 1966, and has generated a $12 million cumulative domestic and international gross through 2025. The film is credited with launching Goldman's career as a screenwriter.

=== Critical response ===
On the review aggregator website Rotten Tomatoes, 95% of 21 critics' reviews are positive.

=== Awards and nominations ===
Award	Category	Recipient(s)	Result	Ref.
Edgar Allan Poe Awards	Best Motion Picture	William Goldman	Won	
Laurel Awards	Top Action Drama		5th Place	
Laurel Awards	Top Action Performance	Paul Newman	3rd Place	
Writers Guild of America Awards	Best Written American Drama	William Goldman	Nominated	

== Sequel ==
Goldman adapted The Chill (1964), another Macdonald 'Archer' novel, for the same producers, but it was not filmed. Newman pulled out of the project, and Sam Peckinpah became attached as director for a while as the film was set up at Commonwealth United Entertainment. When that company ended its film operations, The Chill was not made.

An adaptation of Macdonald's 1950 novel The Drowning Pool, with Paul Newman reprising his role, was released in 1975.

== See also ==
- List of American films of 1966
