= Moon Fire Temple =

Temple in Los Angeles Country, California

Coordinates: 34.057006°N 118.594674°W

Moon Fire Temple is a garden temple located in the Santa Monica Mountains with a 360 degree panoramic view overlooking the Pacific Ocean, Malibu and the greater Los Angeles metropolitan area. Jimi Hendrix, Janis Joplin and The Doors performed at the Moon Fire Temple regularly during the late 1960s and early 1970s.

The temple was built for the 1966 Paul Newman film, Harper, and is featured prominently as The Temple in the Clouds.

Artists who have featured their work include Andy Warhol, David Nelson Rose, Bon Jovi, Mastodon, My Life with the Thrill Kill Kult, Dokken's music video "Walk Away", and Tommy Chong in Far Out Man.

Media appearances include:

- Harper (1966 film)
- The Stone Killer (1973 film)
- Far Out Man (1990 film)
- Babylon A.D. (2008 film)
- Maxim magazine
- Bebe magazine
- Italian Vogue magazine
- Vogue magazine
- Violet magazine
- High Times magazine
- Amica magazine
