= The Way Some People Die =

1951 novel by Ross Macdonald

- First edition
- Author: Ross Macdonald
- Language: English
- Series: Lew Archer
- Genre: Detective, Mystery novel
- Publisher: Knopf
- Publication date: 1951
- Publication place: United States
- Media type: Print (Hardcover, Paperback)
- Preceded by: The Drowning Pool
- Followed by: The Ivory Grin

The Way Some People Die is a detective mystery published, under the author's then pseudonym of John Ross Macdonald, by Alfred A. Knopf in 1951. It is Ross Macdonald's third book to feature his private eye Lew Archer. The plot centres on the activities of heroin-traffickers, a form of criminality which Macdonald particularly despised.

== Plot ==
An investigation keeps Lew Archer constantly on the move about Southern California, beginning in Santa Monica, where Mrs. Samuel Lawrence gives Lew Archer 50 dollars for one day of his time to find her missing daughter Galatea (a.k.a. Galley). Archer soon discovers that Galley has married a small-time mobster named Joe Tarantine. Starting the investigation in the most likely place, with Tarantine's brother, Mario, Archer finds the man in hospital after a severe beating. Shortly after that Mr. Dowser, a big-time mobster and drug runner living near Pacific Palisades, offers him a retainer to find Tarantine, who has absconded with property of his. That this was a shipment of heroin stolen from Dowser's agent, Herman Speed, is not revealed until later.

Archer travels to Palm Springs, where Galley was last sighted, and is led to Joe Tarantine's hideout by her admirer Keith Dalling. Though Archer manages to speak to Galley briefly, he is slugged from behind and is found lying by the roadside by Mrs Marjorie Fellows. When he returns to Dalling's apartment, it is to find him shot; then later Tarantine's body is discovered in a motorboat awash on the rocks beyond the fictitious Pacific Point. Following another lead, Archer discovers that Marjorie's husband, "Colonel Henry Fellows", is in fact Herman Speed, who has borrowed $30,000 from her to invest on her behalf. In reality he had used it to buy the stolen heroin from Joe Tarantine, hoping to sell it on at a profit. Archer tracks Speed down in San Francisco and forces him to hand over the drugs, after which Speed commits suicide. Archer then hands the heroin over to Dowser and arranges for the police to raid the house and arrest him immediately afterwards.

When Archer returns to the Pacific Point morgue, he learns that Joe Tarantine had been dead before being placed in his boat and set adrift. Mario suspects that it was Galley who was responsible, using Dalling as an accomplice, and goes after her. Archer discovers her in Dalling's house, where she has shot Mario after he attacked her. She admits to having helped kill Joe and then Dalling and is about to shoot Archer when the badly injured Mario enters the room and she empties the gun into him before he will die. Galley now admits that she had been Speed's hospital nurse after he was shot during the heroin robbery and had met Joe Tarantine through him. After Archer has her arrested, he visits Mrs Lawrence to tell her the case is closed. Finding her convinced of Galley's innocence, he gives her the fee he had originally accepted from Dowser in order to help pay her legal fees.

== Evaluation ==
On its appearance, The Way Some People Die was met with admiring reviews as a book transcending its genre. For James Sandoe of the New York Herald Tribune, "his book follows the hard-boiled pattern with a rare freshness and originality". And for Anthony Boucher, writing in The New York Times, "Macdonald has the makings of a novelist of serious calibre – in his vivid realization of locale; in his striking prose style…in his moving three-dimensional characterization…[It is] the best novel in the tough tradition I've read since Farewell, My Lovely and possibly since The Maltese Falcon."

Tom Nolan later described the novel in his biography of Macdonald as "A vivid tableau of postwar southern California and a stylish retelling of certain Greek myths". Galley is a strikingly beautiful 24-year-old who uses her looks to manipulate susceptible men. The name Galatea (which means milk-white) occurs twice in ancient myth. Firstly it is that of the stone statue with whom her creator, Pygmalion, fell in love. Secondly it was the name of a sea nymph whose partner meets a violent death.

The mythological parallel is not insisted on by Macdonald. Though Joe Tarantine's body is discovered in a wrecked boat, suggesting a sea connection, it had been placed there after he had been murdered on land and his body kept in a refrigerator. Another critic makes more of the Pygmalion connection. The sculptor had despised all women before he created his ideal in stone and fell in love with that. Other characters in the novel project onto Galley their own perceptions and so do not guess her true, inhuman nature. It is only towards the end that Archer himself sees through her: "Only the female sex was human in her eyes, and she was its only important member."

Indeed, Archer's insight is itself one more projection, a reflection of his own personality. Although he is capable of sympathy - and manifests it in his care to rehabilitate the teenage addict Ruth – his insight into the chaos of human relationships is mainly useful "as a means to follow his profession". Essentially, as several other commentators have put it, Archer is (and must remain) a neutral figure. As with Galley, he uses what he has for his own ends, even though those are widely divergent.

== Bibliography ==
- Tom Nolan, Ross Macdonald: a biography, Scribner 1999
