= Find a Victim =

Novel

First edition 1954

Find a Victim is a novel by Canadian-American author Ross Macdonald, the fifth in a series featuring detective Lew Archer. It was published as a Borzoi Book by Alfred A. Knopf in 1954 and mass marketed by Bantam Books in the following year. The first British hardback was published in Cassell & Company's Crime Connoisseur series in 1955, the same year that a French translation appeared as Vous qui entrez ici (Presses de la Cité, collection 'Un Mystère' #202). At this period the author was writing under the name John Ross Macdonald and was also identified as Kenneth Millar on the Knopf dust jacket.

Macdonald had to rewrite parts of Find A Victim "as often as five times", in part because of conflicting expectations from his main publisher, Knopf, and Bantam, his new paperback publisher. Macdonald wanted to avoid explicit violence popularized by the likes of Mickey Spillane, and rather to emphasize character and psychology. However, Knopf demanded less wordiness and more drama. Bantam would have preferred more sex but Knopf thought that would offend readers. Though the novel had mixed notices, some favorable reviewers saw in Macdonald the successor to Raymond Chandler and Dashiell Hammett. Anthony Boucher, critic for The New York Times, described the book as "about as good as the hardboiled detective story can get".

== Plot ==
On the way from southern California to a court hearing in Sacramento, private detective Lew Archer comes across a trucker who has been shot and dumped by the roadside. Archer drives him to Kerrigan's Motel and calls an ambulance from there, but the victim dies soon afterwards and Archer agrees to stop in Las Cruces for the inquest.

Archer soon finds that most people in Las Cruces know each other. The victim was Tony Aquista and trucked for the embittered Meyer; of Meyer's two daughters the elder, Hilda, is married to the town's antagonistic Sheriff Butler. The younger daughter, Anne, had been raped by her father at 15 and later had affairs with her brother-in-law, with Kerrigan and with Aquista, among others; now she is missing. So is the truck full of whiskey that Aquista was driving and Meyer hires Archer to trace it.

His investigation takes him to The Golden Slipper nightclub where Jo Summer was the singer until lately. After tracking her down, he falls foul of her lover Bozey, a vicious young thug who beats him up. Then, in following Kerrigan, Archer discovers the hiding place of the missing truck and Bozey nearly runs him down in it. Afterwards Archer doubles back to Kerrigan's motel, discovers Kerrigan has been shot and sees Jo driving away.

Archer talks to Mrs Kerrigan, who gives him the keys to her mountain cabin on Lake Perdida, where he goes to look for Anne Meyer. He learns that Anne and Kerrigan had spent a recent weekend there and also speaks to MacGowan, the only permanent resident of the resort, who turns out to be Jo Summer's grandfather.

In Las Cruces, Archer has a fight with the sheriff and is only saved from being shot by Hilda Butler. Believing that Butler does not want to get to the truth, Archer goes to District Attorney Westmore, who gives him details of Bozey's recent involvement in a bank robbery: since the notes were recorded, he needed to raise ready cash from the hijacked whiskey consignment. For Westmore, Bozey is the obvious culprit for Aquista's and Kerrigan's murders, but Archer remains unconvinced.

From Kerrigan's wife Archer learns that her husband was in financial difficulties and his motive for involvement in the hijacking was to get away with Jo, using the pay-off – not realizing that Bozey had swindled him by using the hot money from the robbery. As they are talking, MacGowan arrives with the news that Jo had been up to Lake Perdida but had left again to search for Bozey and was heading for the abandoned mining camp of Traverse.

MacGowan and Archer set out for Traverse, convinced that the stolen truck is hidden there. On their way they meet Jo driving down with the stolen bank money; she has been raped by Bozey's gang, and the gang has also beaten up Bozey, intending to steal the whiskey consignment for themselves. She also reveals that Kerrigan had previously found Anne murdered in his cabin and disposed of the body.

MacGowan and Archer now ambush the gang, who are transferring the consignment into a different truck so as to escape detection. One of the gang is killed, another is wounded but manages to board the truck as it leaves; eventually it goes off the road, killing those on board. Archer meanwhile persuades Bozey to cooperate with him as the only way to escape being convicted for the murders in which he is circumstantially implicated. Together they locate where Anne's body has been hidden.

Ballistic evidence proves that Anne, Kerrigan and Aquista were all killed by the same gun. The gun was given by Meyer to Anne, but Archer gets Hilda to admit that she had stolen it from her sister. Hilda's motive for the murders was jealousy of her sister and the men Anne had slept with, and especially the ultimate betrayal of stealing her own husband. Sheriff Butler arrives to clarify details and is ready to turn himself in for not acting earlier on the knowledge of his wife's guilt. Archer promises not to support the legal case against him and advises Butler to have his wife committed as temporarily insane.

== Bibliography ==
- Tom Nolan, Ross Macdonald:A Biography, Scribner 1999
