= Sleeping Beauty (novel) =

1973 novel by Ross Macdonald

- First edition
- Author: Ross Macdonald
- Language: English
- Series: Lew Archer
- Genre: Detective fiction
- Publisher: Alfred A. Knopf
- Publication date: 1973
- Publication place: United States
- Media type: Print (Hardcover and Paperback)
- Pages: 271 p.
- ISBN: 0-394-48474-6
- OCLC: 539704
- Dewey Decimal: 813/.5/2
- LC Class: PZ3.M59943 Sl PS3525.I486
- Preceded by: The Underground Man
- Followed by: The Blue Hammer

Sleeping Beauty is a 1973 novel by Ross Macdonald.

== Adaptation ==
KCRW adapted Sleeping Beauty for a radio play in 1996.
