= The Ivory Grin =

1952 novel by Ross Macdonald

First edition 1952

The Ivory Grin is Ross Macdonald's fourth Lew Archer detective novel, published in April 1952. Like most of Macdonald's, the plot is complicated and takes place mostly in out of the way Californian locations.

== The novel ==
Macdonald's working title for the novel was The Split Woman. The phrase The Ivory Grin that he eventually preferred appears near the start of the book. The author had still not decided on the final form of his assumed name by that date and used John Ross Macdonald on the cover. It was published by Alfred A. Knopf in April 1952, and by Cassel & Co in London. Next year the paperback edition from Pocket Books was retitled Marked for Murder without Macdonald's permission. The cover featured a blonde loading an automatic, a female corpse and a blazing car.

In Britain the book was favourably reviewed by Julian Symons, noting in the Times Literary Supplement that "The Ivory Grin uses many of the thriller’s standard ingredients, but it is not at all a standard product". In 1958 Symons also compiled for the Sunday Times a list of "The 99 Best Crime Stories" from 1794 to the present and included there The Ivory Grin. In the decade between 1964 and 1975 eight translations of the book were to appear: in Catalan, Danish, French, Czech, in German from Switzerland, Hungarian, Finnish, and in Spanish from Argentina.

== Plot ==
Archer is asked to tail Lucy Champion, a colored girl light enough to pass for white. He suspects that his client Una has given him false details about herself and the reason for her request but agrees because he needs the money. After tailing Lucy, he discovers her in a motel room with her throat slit. Among her effects is a newspaper clipping offering a reward for information concerning Charles Singleton, a socialite missing from his home in Arroyo Beach. Archer sees a connection, since it is dated from the time that Lucy left her employer a fortnight before.

Lucy's boyfriend Alex is imprisoned on suspicion of being her murderer. Archer believes he is innocent and agrees to help Lieutenant Brake with the case, hoping to clear Alex's name. What he learns about Singleton is that he had been connected since 1943 with a good-looking blonde named Bess. This eventually proves to be the clue that helps Archer to unravel a complicated history. As a teenager, Bess had been given a night club position by Chicago gangster Leo Durano and had then come West and married the small-town Doctor Benning, while at the same time carrying on an affair with Singleton.

Singleton's car is discovered burnt out after an accident in the mountains, but Archer is able to prove that the body in it belongs to crooked private eye Maxfield Heiss, who was also in pursuit of the reward money. When Archer locates the missing Bess, she agrees to tell her story in return for stake money to escape the area. She confirms that Una is Leo Durano's sister, who has been intermittently insane for years while Una has cared for him. Presently they are located in a mansion at Arroyo Beach, living off his share of the numbers game pay-off. Two weeks before, she had given Leo a gun and driven him to where Bess and Charles shared a mountain shack. Leo had shot Charles and they had taken him to Dr Benning for treatment, but Charles had died on the operating table. At this point, Una bursts in and shoots Bess, while Archer kills Una.

Later Archer confronts Dr Benning and accuses him of deliberately killing Charles out of jealousy. Lucy, who had been acting as Benning's nurse, spotted his guilt and the doctor had in turn murdered her. He had also disposed of Charles' body and mounted the skeleton in a cupboard, pretending he had bought it for study purposes. Archer disgustedly denies him the chance of committing suicide and turns him in so as to exonerate the wrongly imprisoned Alex.

== Bibliography ==
Tom Nolan, Ross MacDonald: A Biography, Scribner 1999
