= The Far Side of the Dollar =

Novel by Ross Macdonald

First edition cover by Collins Publishers illustrating the theme of social dislocation

The Far Side of the Dollar is the 12th detective novel by Ross Macdonald to feature his private eye, Lew Archer. A condensed version was published by Cosmopolitan in 1964; in 1965 the full version appeared in the US from Alfred A. Knopf and in the UK from Collins Publishers.

Macdonald's dedication of the book "To Alfred" acknowledges his regular American publisher. The novel received the 1965 Gold Dagger Award in the UK and was nominated in the US for the 1966 Edgar Awards.

== Plot ==
Lew Archer is called to a facility for disturbed youngsters from rich families to locate Tom Hillman, who has escaped after barely a week. While Archer is there, Tom's father, successful businessman Ralph Hillman, arrives in a rage and is refunded his fee. Archer then drives Hillman back to his home south of Los Angeles and learns on the way that Hillman has received a ransom demand for Tom.

Once home, it is plain that tensions in the Hillman family will make finding what has happened to Tom difficult as both parents are wary about discussing the events that led to their son's committal. Hillman is a self-made man who rose to command in the navy during World War 2 and had only married his frigid wife Elaine for the sake of her money. He seems to relate more closely now to another young man, Dick Leandro, whom he takes along to help crew his yacht. Only Tom's girlfriend, Stella Carson, who lives next door, is prepared to provide any background to help bring him back.

Archer follows a lead to the bar where Tom used to play jazz piano, and then to the leader of the combo that played there. From him Archer learns that as well as Stella, Tom has been seen around with an older blonde and Archer suspects that she may have been used as bait by the kidnap gang. When he locates the woman, however, Archer discovers her apparently beaten to death in a motel and is himself shot at and clubbed by her husband when he tries to catch him. Meanwhile Hillman has paid the ransom but still has not heard from Tom.

From Lieutenant Bastian, who is assigned to the murder case, Archer learns that the husband has escaped in a car with Idaho license plates. From a Hollywood contact, Archer learns that the dead woman was once a 1945 starlet called Carol Brown who came from Idaho and had married a sailor. Her publicity photo had been taken by Harold Harley, then based at the Barcelona Hotel. The hotel is now shut down, but Archer eventually locates Harold in Long Beach. He too is from Idaho, but it is Harold's domineering brother Mike who was Carol's husband.

Bastian and Archer interview Hillman after discovering evidence that Tom may have been co-operating with Mike Harley. Hillman remembers that Harley had served with him in the navy, from which Hillman had Harley discharged for bad conduct, raising the possibility that the kidnap is a spite crime. Harley's trail is traced to Las Vegas, where he has lost all the ransom money gambling. Archer then heads for the Harley farm in Pocatello, Idaho, discovering there that the Harley father had had several stays in mental institutions and used to beat his boys sadistically. Archer also visits the dysfunctional Browns, who had allowed Mike to stay with them for a while. It was their daughter Carol whom Mike had run away with and married, leaving in the company of a crooked ex-policeman named Otto Sipe.

Stella tells Archer that Tom has asked her to meet him at Santa Monica bus station. Archer suspects that Tom has been hiding out at the Barcelona Hotel, where Sipe acts as caretaker. He and the manager of the service station opposite come across Sipe digging a grave for Mike Harley, who has been stabbed with a long knife, but Sipe is shot while trying to escape. Later Elaine Hillman admits that Tom has discovered that he was adopted and that Carol Harley was his real mother. The adoption had been arranged by Dr Weintraub, another of Hillman's former naval colleagues, and the child was really Hillman's.

Archer takes Stella to meet Tom in Santa Monica and they all return home, where Bastian arrives to reveal that Carol had really been stabbed with the same knife that killed Harley and that Hillman had purchased it. Leandro is also identified as having driven to the hotel on the night of Harley's killing. Eventually it emerges that he was driving Mrs Hillman, who had been responsible for murdering both Carol and Mike. Archer refuses to be bribed to keep quiet and she stabs herself with her own knitting needles.

== Symptoms of social chaos ==
The Far Side of the Dollar is somewhat formulaic in dealing with the hunt for a missing son while functioning in addition as an indictment of the corroding influence of wealth. The title adapts a remark at the start of the 11th chapter that the "guys and dolls pursuing the rapid buck hated to be reminded of what was waiting on the far side of the last dollar". The investigator himself sees through the "comfortable surfaces [that] cover histories of self-deception and the plastic morality of the marketplace" where "quarrelling adults and disoriented children are the tell-tale symptoms of the social chaos" with which Archer is asked to deal. But while being "a mystery of character and substance", in the opinion of one commentator the novel is not among the author's best. Partly this is because the murderer, an East Coast kill-joy who fails to fit into the Californian setting, "is one of Macdonald’s less believable creations". For another commentator it is Archer himself who is the problem. Very little detection is done by him; instead he stands apart, judgmentally observing others as they bare their souls before him.
