= Archer (1975 TV series) =

American television series

- Based on: the character Lew Archer by Ross Macdonald
- Developed by: David Karp
- Starring: Brian Keith; John P. Ryan
- Theme music composer: Jerry Goldsmith
- Composers: Duane Tatro; Jerry Goldsmith
- Country of origin: United States
- Original language: English
- No. of seasons: 1
- No. of episodes: 6

Production
- Executive producer: David Karp
- Running time: 60 minutes
- Production company: Paramount Television

Original release
- Network: NBC
- Release: January 30 – March 13, 1975

Archer is an American TV drama series that aired on NBC from January 30, 1975, to March 13, 1975. The show was based on the titular private-eye featured in the series of novels by Ross Macdonald.

Due to low ratings, NBC announced it would cancel the show after only two episodes had aired. The show aired 9pm–10pm Eastern Time on Thursday nights, with the show continuing to air until March 13, 1975.

== Premise ==
Lew Archer was a detective and former cop who often worked with the police but sometimes bent the law if necessary. He used his basic skills of deduction to solve his cases, rather than force, and the show portrayed him as a regular guy without any gimmicks.

== Cast ==
- Brian Keith as Lew Archer
- John P. Ryan as Lt. Barney Brighton

== Episodes ==
No.	Title	Directed by	Written by	Original release date
1	"The Turkish Connection"	Gary Nelson	David P. Harmon	January 30, 1975
An underground newspaper editor (Marjoe Gortner) does a favor for Archer by going undercover to break up an extortion ring.
2	"The Arsonist"	Paul Stanley	Jim Byrnes	February 6, 1975
Archer aids the owner of a delicatessen who accuses the county tax collector of cheating him out his land.
3	"The Body Beautiful"	Edward M. Abroms	Leigh Brackett	February 13, 1975
Archer is hired to retrieve pornographic photos of a man's fiancee that are being used to embarrass her ex-husband. At first, he refuses, but a subsequent beating gets him back on the case.
4	"Shades of Blue"	John Llewellyn Moxey	David Karp	February 20, 1975
While investigating a claim that a building fire was actually arson, Archer becomes the prime suspect in a murder case.
5	"The Vanished Man"	Arnold Laven	Harold Livingston	March 6, 1975
Archer is hired by a wealthy businessman to find a missing body.
6	"Blood Money"	Jack Arnold	Anthony Lawrence & Wallace Ware	March 13, 1975
Bitter memories are stirred up for two women when Archer is hired as a courier.

== Soundtrack ==
On February 19, 2019, La-La Land Records released a limited edition soundtrack containing the one episode famous film composer Jerry Goldsmith scored (paired with a reissue of the score to the film Warning Shot, from newly discovered better elements).
