= The Ferguson Affair =

Detective story by Ross Macdonald

The Ferguson Affair is a detective story by Ross Macdonald that was published in the US by Alfred A. Knopf in 1960. In 1961 it was published in the UK by William Collins, Sons in their Crime Club series and the same year was published in Italy as Segreto di famiglia (Family Secret) by Il Gallo Mandori. Macdonald's usual protagonist, Lew Archer, is replaced as narrator in this instance by the defence lawyer William Gunnarson.

== Bibliography ==
- Tom Nolan, Ross Macdonald: A Biography, Scribner, 1999
