= The Galton Case =

1959 novel

- First US edition
- Author: Ross Macdonald
- Series: Lew Archer
- Publisher: Knopf
- Publication date: 1959

The Galton Case is the eighth novel in the Lew Archer series by American writer Ross Macdonald. It was published in the US in 1959 by Knopf and in 1960 by Cassel & Co in the UK. The book has been widely translated, although the title has been changed in some cases to highlight other aspects of the story. In French it appeared as Un Mortel Air De Famille (A deadly family likeness, 1964); in Turkish as Ölmek Yasak (Forbidden to die, 1972); in Finnish as Rouva Galtonin perillinen (Mrs Galton’s heir, 1981); and in Italian as Il ragazzo senza storia (Boy without history, 2012). Macdonald thought that with this novel he found his own voice as a writer.

== Plot ==
Lew Archer is hired by attorney Gordon Sable on behalf of Maria Galton, Santa Teresa resident and widow of an oil millionaire. He must try and locate her son Anthony, who had left home twenty years before with his sluttish, pregnant wife. Sable is himself preoccupied with his much younger, mentally unstable wife Alice and has hired as manservant the belligerent Peter Culligan.

Just as Archer is preparing to follow up a clue, Culligan is mortally stabbed and the armed assailant steals Archer's car after crashing his own. Archer flies instead to San Francisco and eventually discovers that the missing Anthony had settled in a former rum-running area called Luna Bay. After the cottage where he had lived under the name of John Brown was demolished during redevelopment, a headless body was discovered buried beneath it. With the help of Anthony’s former doctor and the Luna Bay sheriff, Archer establishes the body’s identity as that of the man he is seeking.

Before leaving, Archer learns that his stolen car has been located, and that the crashed car had belonged to San Francisco resident Roy Lemberg. Interviewing Lemberg's drunken wife, Archer learns that Roy and his violent brother Tommy had associated with a Reno mobster called Schwartz. Archer then visits Redwood City, where Culligan's former wife has remarried and is desperately hiding her past. She had once worked for 'John Brown' in Luna City and, though she was unaware of his murder, she was able to throw suspicion on Culligan and his fellow gang member, 'Shoulders' Nelson.

Sable now drives up to San Francisco to join Archer and they hear that a young man calling himself John Brown has recently arrived from the Detroit area in search of news of his lost father. After Sable and Archer interview him, John leaves for Santa Teresa with Sable while Archer stays behind to tie up loose threads. Finding that Roy Lemberg has left for Reno, he flies there but is waylaid and badly beaten by Schwartz's thugs.

Back in Santa Theresa after hospitalisation, Archer finds that John Brown has been accepted by Mrs Galton as her grandson, although some still suspect him of being an imposter. One who does is Dr Howell, the Galtons' doctor, whose daughter Sheila has fallen in love with the young man. John claimed to have been dumped by his mother in an Ohio orphanage, since destroyed by fire; from there he went to Ann Arbor and had been provided with an education by a benefactor who had since died. Another reason for Howell's distrust is that John's pronunciation and spelling is Canadian rather than American. He hires Archer to investigate further.

In Ann Arbor, Archer locates John's former girlfriend, who confides that his name was Theodore Fredericks and that he had been raised in the poor section of the Canadian town of Pitt, Ontario. John's mother there reveals that he had always been an ambitious fantasist and had run away to the United States six years before with Peter Culligan, who had been a boarder in the family home. Archer also discovers that the Lemberg brothers are now using the house as a hide-out, but Tommy claims that he did not kill Culligan; he had only been sent to intimidate Alice Sable, who had run up gambling debts in Schwartz's casino. Archer believes him and persuades Tommy to take the chance of giving himself up.

Dr Howell and Archer now confront Sable, who has had his wife discharged from the nursing home where she was confined. Sable had been trying to pin Culligan's murder on her when it was actually he who had stabbed Culligan. Both men were part of a plot to impose John on Mrs Galton and syphon off some of his inheritance. But meanwhile, John has escaped with Sheila Howell to Canada, where Archer follows them. In the end, it is John who has solved the mystery. Anthony Galton was John's father after all. Mrs Fredericks was Anthony's young pregnant bride, and she agreed to marry Shoulders Nelson (Fredericks) after he murdered Anthony Galton, to keep herself and her son alive. She is free to tell the truth now that Fredericks has hanged himself rather than face imprisonment.

== The novel ==
Macdonald's biographer has described The Galton Case as "the first of Macdonald’s mature works". Edward Margolies has called it "a kind of bourgeois fairy tale" in which the underdog makes good. The novel was written at a time of personal crisis, when Macdonald was facing memories of his own troubled past, growing up in Canada during the Great Depression. He later mentioned in an interview that the book "is an imaginative reconstruction of certain aspects of my own life as a boy", but went on to clarify that this referred not to actual events so much as the sense of displacement, of not belonging, and it is this that he projects into the character of John Brown junior. On another occasion he described his dilemma then as one "of finding myself to be at the same time two radically different kinds of people, a pauper and a member of the middle class".

Another point of similarity between the author and his anti-hero is the succession of names by which both went. The young man is known as Theodore Fredericks in Canada, then as John Lindsay in Ann Arbor, John Brown in San Francisco, and finally John Galton in Santa Teresa, the last name turning out paradoxically as rightfully his own. In Macdonald's case, he started out as Kenneth Millar in Canada and published his first four books under that name; in 1949 he switched to the pseudonym John Macdonald for his fifth novel, subsequently modifying it to John Ross Macdonald in 1950 and then Ross Macdonald in 1954.

Brown and Macdonald also have acting experience while at university in common. It was because of his proficiency in this, as much as his family likeness, that Brown was first drawn into the conspiracy to defraud the Galton family, thereby setting up the conditions for the story's surprise ending. For, as another commentator observes, the paradox there is that "in posing as John Galton, John Brown was in fact impersonating himself". But it may even be claimed that Macdonald shares in the fatherhood of his alter ego at a deeper literary level, when a poem titled "Luna" provides the vital clue to the destination of Anthony Galton after leaving home. Supposedly written by John Brown's absent father, it is in fact an undergraduate poem written by Macdonald himself.

The poem is a tightly rhymed love lyric represented in the novel as published two decades before by a San Francisco literary figure named Chad Bolling, of whose hip jive and poetry performance at "The Listening Ear" Lew Archer gives a satirical account. Although the satire is directed at the Beat Generation, of whose "sloppy aesthetics" Macdonald disapproved, the character is modelled on Kenneth Rexroth, the literary elder statesman who championed their work. As an incidental character, Bolling only plays a passing role but eventually earns Archer's sympathetic approbation. As in the case of others in the novel, first impressions prove deceptive.

Other aspects of the book influenced Jerome Charyn to begin his detective series "The Isaac Quartet", beginning with Blue Eyes, published in 1974. In an Afterword to Blue Eyes, Charyn subsequently wrote of the insights he gained from Macdonald's novel: "The book had a morphology I happened to admire - as if Ross Macdonald were in the habit of undressing bodies to find the skeleton underneath. Nothing was overwrought: landscape, language, and character were all laid bare. But this was no simpleminded accident. It was Macdonald’s particular craft, that 'wild masonry of laying detail on detail to make a structure'."
