= The Drowning Pool =

1950 mystery novel by Ross Macdonald

- First edition
- Author: Ross Macdonald
- Cover artist: Bill English
- Language: English
- Series: Lew Archer
- Genre: Mystery novel
- Publisher: Knopf
- Publication date: 1950
- Publication place: United States
- Media type: Print (Hardcover, Paperback)
- Pages: 182
- ISBN: 0-679-76806-8
- OCLC: 35172920
- Dewey Decimal: 813/.52 20
- LC Class: PS3525.I486 D75 1996
- Preceded by: The Moving Target
- Followed by: The Way Some People Die

The Drowning Pool is a 1950 mystery novel by American writer Ross Macdonald, then writing under the name John Ross Macdonald (and simply John Macdonald in the UK). It is his second book in the series revolving around the cases of private detective Lew Archer and was published by Alfred A. Knopf in the US and in 1952 by Cassell in the UK. It was made into the 1975 Paul Newman film The Drowning Pool

== Plot ==
Archer is hired by Maude Slocum to investigate a libellous letter accusing her of adultery. He begins his enquiry at the Californian town of Quinto, north of Los Angeles, where the Slocums live on a mesa above the seedy oil-boom town of Nopal Valley on the other side. Also in the house live Maude's mother-in-law Olivia, who holds the family's financial reins, as well as her effeminate son James, Maude's husband, and their vulnerable teenage daughter Cathy.

At a party to which he gets himself invited, Archer becomes aware of the tensions in the family, especially after the recent arrival of Francis Marvell, English author of the play in which Slocum is acting at the local theatre. Also present is Ralph Knudson, the Valley police chief, who only adds to the uneasiness.

When Archer drives away, he gives a lift to Pat Reavis, the Slocums' fantasist chauffeur, and goes for a drink with him in Nopal Valley. While still in the town, Archer is apprehended and escorted back to the Slocum residence as a murder suspect by the belligerent Detective Sergeant Franks. In his absence, Olivia Slocum had been drowned in her swimming pool, but suspicion finally falls on Reavis instead.

Archer discovers where Reavis has an apartment in Los Angeles and that his true name is Patrick Ryan, but is caught going through his papers and knocked out. Following a lead, however, he locates Reavis' sister Elaine in Las Vegas. Trailing her to Reavis' hideout, Archer forces him at gunpoint to drive back to California. Just before they get to Nopal Valley, however, they are ambushed by a party of masked men who gun Reavis down and burn his body.

Archer now establishes that the corrupt Detective Sergeant Franks has been working for Walter Kilbourne, owner of the local oil company. In the past the company had surveyed the Slocum property and made a bid for it that had been refused by Olivia. But by the time Archer makes it back to the Slocum residence, Maude has poisoned herself with strychnine. When Knudson arrives, Archer tells him that Franks was the informant responsible for the death of Reavis. Knudson threatens to have Archer arrested unless he agrees to drop the case.

Kilbourne's wife Mavis now telephones Archer and asks him to meet her at the pier in Quinto. She wants to have her husband arrested for his complicity in the murder of Reavis, but Kilbourne comes in by speedboat and abducts Archer. Having failed to bribe him to stay silent, Kilbourne turns Archer over to his criminal associate Melliotes to torture him in a private hydrotherapy clinic. Archer barely escapes with his life and locates Mavis there, who in turn shoots Kilbourne, expecting Archer to help her escape to Mexico. Instead he persuades her to turn herself in and plead self-defence.

After meeting an old friend of Maude Slocum's, Archer learns that she had an affair with Knudson while at university, but they could not marry. When she became pregnant, Maude agreed to marry Slocum, who was a closet homosexual and needed to hide it. When Archer next visits the house, Slocum tells him that he is convinced Maude had murdered his mother. Leaving him to the future care of Francis Marvell, Archer confronts Cathy, who confesses that she had murdered her supposed grandmother in a muddled attempt to restore family harmony.

When Knudson discovers Archer back at the house, the two men fight and Knudson loses. Deciding that too many people have died already, Archer lets Cathy leave for Chicago uncharged and in the care of her real father.

== Genre ==
Macdonald was consciously aiming at the hardboiled fiction market in this novel, which features a good deal of gratuitous violence, rather than the psychological investigations which later became the speciality of his private investigator, Lew Archer. But in his introduction to a later edition, John Banville sees Macdonald's eventual signature themes already waiting in the wings. "There is hardly a character in the book without something to hide from his or her past." Seeing the character’s potential, himself, Macdonald commented to his publisher, Alfred Knopf, that "I have an idea that Archer as he becomes well known will do quite well for both of us" while measuring his own performance against Raymond Chandler's.

The Drowning Pool was also included by Drewey Wayne Gunn in his survey of Gay American Novels, describing James Slocum as "a stereotypical gay man [who plays] a very small but catalytic role". Slocum's companion, the gay playwright Francis Marvell, with his stringy neck and bobbing Adam's apple, is claimed to be based on W. H. Auden, Macdonald's former professor at the University of Michigan in 1938

== Reception ==
The New York Times called the book "a fast moving, smoothly written first rate whodunit" and named it one of the top mysteries of 1950.

The later 1975 movie The Drowning Pool was loosely based on the novel but made radical departures from the plot, particularly in moving the location to Louisiana.
