= The Barbarous Coast =

1956 novel by Ross Macdonald

- The original Knopf cover
- Author: Ross Macdonald
- Language: English
- Publication date: 1956

The Barbarous Coast is a 1956 detective novel by Canadian-American author Ross Macdonald, the sixth to feature private investigator Lew Archer and his eleventh novel overall. It was published by Alfred A. Knopf in hardcover, and by Bantam Books as a paperback. The plot follows Archer's attempt to locate a missing young woman who is associated with an upscale country club. The novel takes an acid view of Southern California society that foreshadows Macdonald's later treatment of cross-generational deterministic themes.

== Plot summary ==
Lew Archer is summoned to the Channel Club on Malibu Beach and stops to talk to the gateman, Tony Torres. Just then a hot-headed Canadian named George Wall tries to barge into the private grounds with the plea that he is looking for his wife, but is turned away. Once inside, Archer discovers from Clarence Bassett, the club manager, that the job being offered is to protect him from Wall's threats. His wife Hester had once been an exhibition diver at the club and the middle-aged Bassett has taken a fatherly interest in her welfare. In his office is an old photograph of three divers in action who are identified as Hester Campbell, as she was then known, Gabrielle Torres (Tony's daughter) and her cousin Manuel (who now calls himself Lance). Since the three were photoed together, Gabrielle had been found shot dead on the beach, Hester had run away from Malibu and married Wall in Toronto, while Lance had started working for the gangster Carl Stern.

In order to keep him out of trouble, Archer allows Wall to tag along as he tries to locate Hester. As he does so, he discovers that Stern has been trying to establish a casino in Las Vegas. Unable to gain a gaming licence because of his Syndicate connections, Stern has brought in Simon Graff as his front man. Graff, a partner in Helio-Graff Studios in Hollywood, is a member of the Channel Club and has married the unstable daughter of his partner. Manuel Torres, now going by the name of Lance Leonard, is to have a part in the studio's next film.

Another lead takes Archer to Hester's former home in Beverly Hills, into which she has moved again, having suddenly become affluent. There he is beaten up by one of Stern's thugs and taken to be interrogated by Leroy Frost, head of security at Helio-Graff; after receiving a further beating when he resists, he finally manages to escape. Archer believes that Hester has been murdered and checks Lance's home, only to find him murdered there. However, on returning to the Beverly Hills house he discovers Hester packing to leave in a state of terror.

Later Wall rings Archer from a hospital in Las Vegas, where he has been taken after a beating in Stern's office. Hester has also rung Archer from the town and he flies to Las Vegas to locate her. When he does so, he discovers the woman is really Rina Campbell, Hester's sister, who resembles her closely. Carl Stern had persuaded Rina to lay a false trail in order to allow Hester to escape abroad. But as they talk, Frost appears together with Stern's thugs in order to kill Rina, having already disposed of Hester, as Archer suspected. This time Archer overcomes the thugs and disables Frost by shooting him in the arm; then he forces Frost to show them where Hester's corpse has been hidden.

After returning to Los Angeles, Archer interviews Dr Frey, Rina's employer, about his schizophrenic patient Isobel Graff, whom Archer had met the evening before at a party in the Channel Club. Her husband Simon had once had an affair with Gabrielle Torres and Isobel may have been the girl's killer and later complicit in Hester's death too. In fact Isobel had shot Gabrielle with a gun belonging to Graff, but only wounded her. Bassett had engineered the confrontation and used the gun himself to complete the killing. Later he blackmailed Graff, making him believe that it was his wife's shot that was fatal. It also emerges that Bassett was responsible for the killing of Hester, Lance and Stern, who had also been blackmailing Graff. Graff incites Tony Torres to kill Bassett in revenge for the death of his daughter Isobel and Archer turns Graff over to the police.

== Background and themes ==
Ross Macdonald's first nine novels had been published under various pen names, and also under the author's legal name of Kenneth Millar. The Barbarous Coast was the first in which he used the Ross Macdonald name, under which all his earlier works were eventually re-published. His working title for the novel had been The Dying Animal, the one given the condensed version of the narrative published in Cosmopolitan. That title had been rejected by Knopf, who offered alternatives inspired by fellow crime writer Mickey Spillane, such as "Cut the Throat Slowly" and "My Gun Is Me". Macdonald's counter suggestion of The Barbarous Coast has been conjectured as a parody of 'Barbary Coast', the red-light district in 19th-century San Francisco. Two years before he had given the similarly punning title "The Guilt-Edged Blonde" to one of his Lew Archer short stories.

There may also be a connection between this title and Archer's Chandleresque denunciation of the relationship between Hollywood culture and its links with organized crime, which is one of the novel's themes. As he is flying back to Los Angeles from Las Vegas with Rina Campbell, she comments that the pressure of fear which she had been under had made her feel "like a whore – as though I wasn’t worth anything to myself". Archer's reply is "That’s the way the jerks want you to feel…And the jerks would get away with the things jerks want to get away with. They're not, though. Jerkiness isn't as respectable as it used to be, not even in L. A. Which is why they had to build Vegas." Archer's judgment is echoed in the words of a contemporary review that appeared in The Detroit News: "Not since the novels of Nathanael West has the theme of American innocence grinding to a stop at the polluted waters of the Pacific so consistently reverberated through a body of writing".

=== Social mobility themes ===
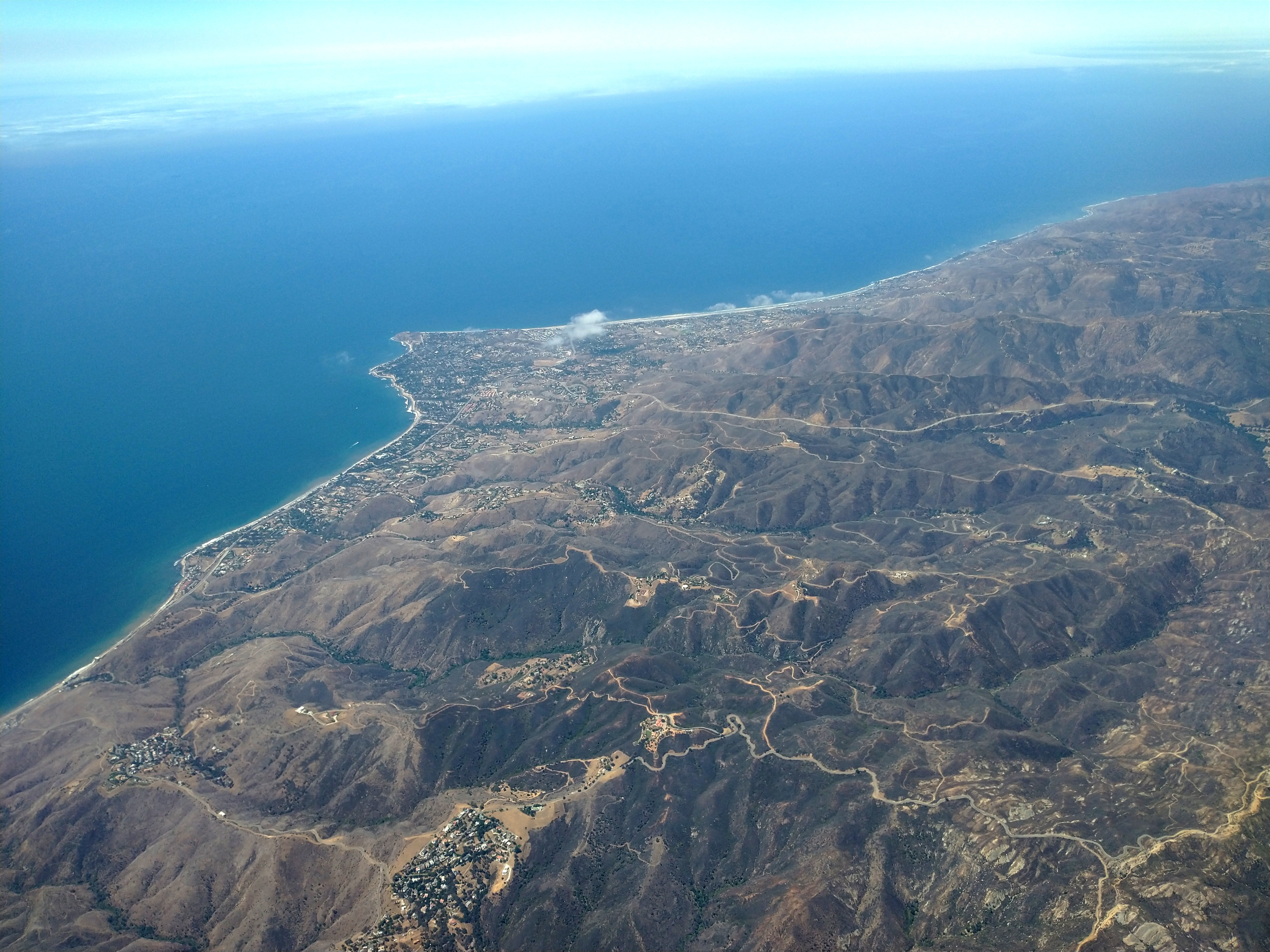
Malibu, a landscape of blocked opportunity and twisted motivation in The Barbarous Coast

In a later introduction to his novel, Macdonald noted that "it was my largest book so far, in both social range and moral complexity". But there is a definite pessimism about the avenues to social mobility displayed there. Joseph Tobias, having served as a black soldier, chooses the way of education and seems trapped in the role of life guard at the socially exclusive Channel Club. Tony Torres had chosen boxing as his avenue away from Anti-Mexican sentiment and afterwards serves grudgingly as the Channel Club's security guard. His daughter Gabrielle makes up to a film magnate there as a way of escape and is murdered. His nephew changes his name to Lance and graduates from boxer to well-heeled criminal, with the possibility of a film career before he is shot. The Campbells had been victims of the Wall Street crash of 1929. One daughter attempts to escape poverty by marrying money and is murdered while trying to undo the mess she has got herself into; her sister chooses the nursing profession and only narrowly escapes murder herself. Bennett is another Stock Market casualty who, from being an original co-founder of the Channel Club is reduced to club servant, having to defer to its corrupt membership. When ill-feeling takes him down the path of blackmail and murder, he becomes a murder victim himself at the hands of one of his employees.

Macdonald was aged forty by the time The Barbarous Coast was published, and the novel's sense of disenchantment has an autobiographical basis. Having known poverty also in his Canadian boyhood, he had returned to California to make a career as a writer – perhaps even as a serious or academic author. He had a Ph.D and "was one of the most brilliant graduate students in the history of the University of Michigan". Yet with the approach of middle age he had achieved a place no higher than as a genre writer of crime fiction. His family life was troubled as well. 1956 was the year in which his daughter Linda was responsible for a hit and run incident while she was driving. The novel marks the initiation of Macdonald's interest in treating cross-generational themes that was to be such of feature of his later books, even as he turned at the same time to the task of facing up to his own personal devils.
