= The Wycherly Woman =

1961 novel

- The Knopf first edition cover
- Author: Ross Macdonald
- Language: English
- Genre: Mystery Thriller
- Publisher: Borzoi Books (Penguin Random House)
- Publication date: 1961
- Publication place: United States
- Media type: Print
- Pages: 278

The Wycherly Woman is a detective novel by Ross Macdonald. The ninth to feature Lew Archer, it was published by Alfred A. Knopf in 1961. Earlier that year a condensed version had appeared in Cosmopolitan under the title "Take My Daughter Home". The novel was nominated for the 1962 Edgar Awards, and earlier included in Anthony Boucher’s best crime fiction list of 1961.

While some translations of the title were faithful to the original, others contained glosses of the plot, which turns on the hunt for and confusion in identifying a mother and daughter. Titles included Die wahre Mrs. Wycherly (The True Mrs Wycherly, German 1964); Mutter und Tochter (Mother and Daughter), German e-book, 2018; Så levende så død (So living, so dead), Danish 1966; Honba za Phoebe (The Hunt for Phoebe), Czech 1972; Rikas tyttöparka (Rich girl on the lam), Finnish 1990; 위철리 여자 (Smart Woman), Korean 1992.

== Plot ==
Archer is summoned to the Meadow Farms mansion of Californian oil millionaire, Homer Wycherly, just returned from an ocean cruise. Asked to locate Wycherly's daughter Phoebe, missing since she saw Homer off two months before, Archer begins his search at Boulder Beach College, where she had formerly studied. There he interviews Phoebe's college roommate, and her boyfriend Bobby Doncaster. He then heads for San Francisco to interview staff of the docked cruise liner and learns that Phoebe was seen leaving the ship before it sailed with her divorced mother Catherine.

Archer's enquiries take him down the San Francisco Peninsula to a villa in Atherton once owned by Mrs Wycherley, and then to the home of Wycherly's brother-in-law, Carl Trevor, who manages the business for him. Archer had already run foul of crooked estate dealer Ben Merriman, whom he later discovers murdered in the Atherton villa. Another lead takes him to Sacramento, where he manages to interview Catherine Wycherly before he is knocked out by an assailant who drives away with Catherine.

Back on the Peninsula, another lead takes Archer to a run-down apartment where Phoebe had stayed. Her neighbor back then had been Stanley Quillan who, it turns out, was an associate of Merriman's in his blackmailing business and is shot while preparing to escape further enquiries. Archer is accused of the crime but Carl Trevor intervenes to have him released. Together the two then leave for the nearby Medicine Stone resort, where Phoebe's car had been discovered in the sea with a woman's body behind the back seat. Trevor has a heart attack while identifying the body and Archer later finds a witness who identifies the driver of the car as Bobby Doncaster.

By the time Archer gets to Boulder Beach, Bobby has had a phone call and left in great excitement. The call had come from Palo Alto, made by a woman resembling Catherine Wycherly. It turns out to be Phoebe, greatly changed in looks, who has briefly escaped from the sanitarium where her uncle had taken her. She is in a bad mental state and blames herself for all the crimes that have been taking place around her. She is also four months pregnant with Bobby's child.

Under questioning from Archer, Phoebe has to admit that she was not responsible for the murders of Merriman and Quillan, nor of her mother, whose body she had discovered at Atherton. The two blackmailers had forced Phoebe to impersonate her mother so that they could collect her substantial alimony checks and the money raised from selling the villa. Carl Trevor later confesses to Archer that Phoebe is actually his own child and that he had murdered Catherine when she wanted to confess the fact to her husband. He had also killed the blackmailers before they turned on him. In order to protect the vulnerable Phoebe from learning the truth of her parentage, Archer allows Trevor to commit suicide in return for a written confession to the murders.

== The novel ==
Macdonald's agent Dorothy Olding (to whom the novel was ultimately dedicated) read through The Wycherly Woman while it was still in typescript and reported of its style that the "excellent mystery plotting goes on steadily, holding the reader fascinated as the sentences follow each other with an impelling rhythm so suitable to the subject matter, [and] there are underlying cadences of beauty".

For some, however, the confusion of identity between mother and daughter strained credibility. "Can one really believe, for example, that a daughter could impersonate her mother so well as to fool half a dozen people, including her mother's lover?" asks Geoffrey O'Brien in Hardboiled America two decades after publication, but gives the device the benefit of the doubt "because the interrelationships of these characters are more than just a casual permutation". This in turn echoes a press review of the time that "the ending has the psychological truth and depth that the Greeks were so fond of. Here the relationship between mother, father and daughter as revealed at the end does not simply explain the always interesting plot but also expands the scope of the events so that the work opens outwards rather than closes inward".

Macdonald himself considered that "I got into more important moral material there than I had previously and also closer to me. But I didn't think the book was wholly successful. That [it] should have been rewritten, even".
