= Trouble Follows Me =

First edition (publ. Dodd Mead and Company)

Trouble Follows Me is a spy thriller written in 1946 by Kenneth Millar. For this novel, as with his other early work featuring detective Chet Gordon, Millar used his real name—he was to become generally better known as Ross Macdonald.

== Plot summary ==
It's 1945. Ensign Sam Drake attends a party on his last night stationed in Hawaii and meets the woman of his dreams. But before the night is out, her best friend is dead in an upstairs room at the party. It appears to be suicide.

The next day Sam starts his leave before receiving a new post. He returns to his home town of Detroit, and decides to check into a connection there between the dead woman and a radical group of black activists. Another death quickly follows and Sam finds himself on a cross-country adventure, haunted by dangerous characters everywhere he turns.

Trouble Follows Me was reprinted by Lion Paperbacks in 1950 and 1955 under the title of Night Train, with cover art that presented it as a "race novel" to capitalize on the Detroit race riot of 1943.
