= Mystery fiction =

Literary genre

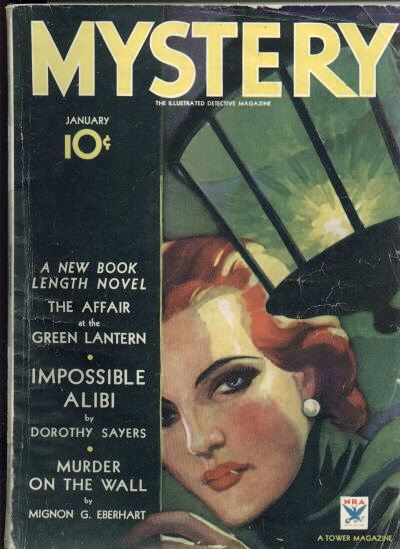
Cover of the pulp mystery-fiction magazine Mystery (January 1934)

Mystery is a fiction genre where the nature of an event, often a murder or other crime, remains mysterious until the end of the story. Often within a closed circle of suspects, each suspect is usually provided with a credible motive and a reasonable opportunity for committing the crime. The central character is often a detective (such as Sherlock Holmes), who eventually solves the mystery by logical deduction from facts presented to the reader. Some mystery books are non-fiction. Mystery fiction can be detective stories in which the emphasis is on the puzzle or suspense element and its logical solution such as a whodunit. Mystery fiction can be contrasted with hardboiled detective stories, which focus on action and gritty realism.

Mystery fiction can involve a supernatural mystery in which the solution does not have to be logical and even in which there is no crime involved. This usage was common in the pulp magazines of the 1930s and 1940s, whose titles such as Dime Mystery, Thrilling Mystery, and Spicy Mystery offered what were then described as complicated to solve and weird stories: supernatural horror in the vein of Grand Guignol. That contrasted with parallel titles of the same names which contained conventional hardboiled crime fiction. The first use of "mystery" in that sense was by Dime Mystery, which started out as an ordinary crime fiction magazine but switched to "weird menace" during the later part of 1933.

== Beginnings ==
The genre of mystery novels is a young form of literature that has developed since the early 19th century. The rise of literacy began in the years of the English Renaissance and, as people began to read over time, they became more individualistic in their thinking. As people became more individualistic in their thinking, they developed a respect for human reason and the ability to solve problems.

Perhaps a reason that mystery fiction was unheard of before the 19th century was due in part to the lack of true police forces. Before the Industrial Revolution, many towns would have constables and a night watchman at best. Naturally, the constable would be aware of every individual in the town, and crimes were either solved quickly or left unsolved entirely. As people began to crowd into cities, police forces became institutionalized, and the need for detectives was realized – thus the mystery novel arose.

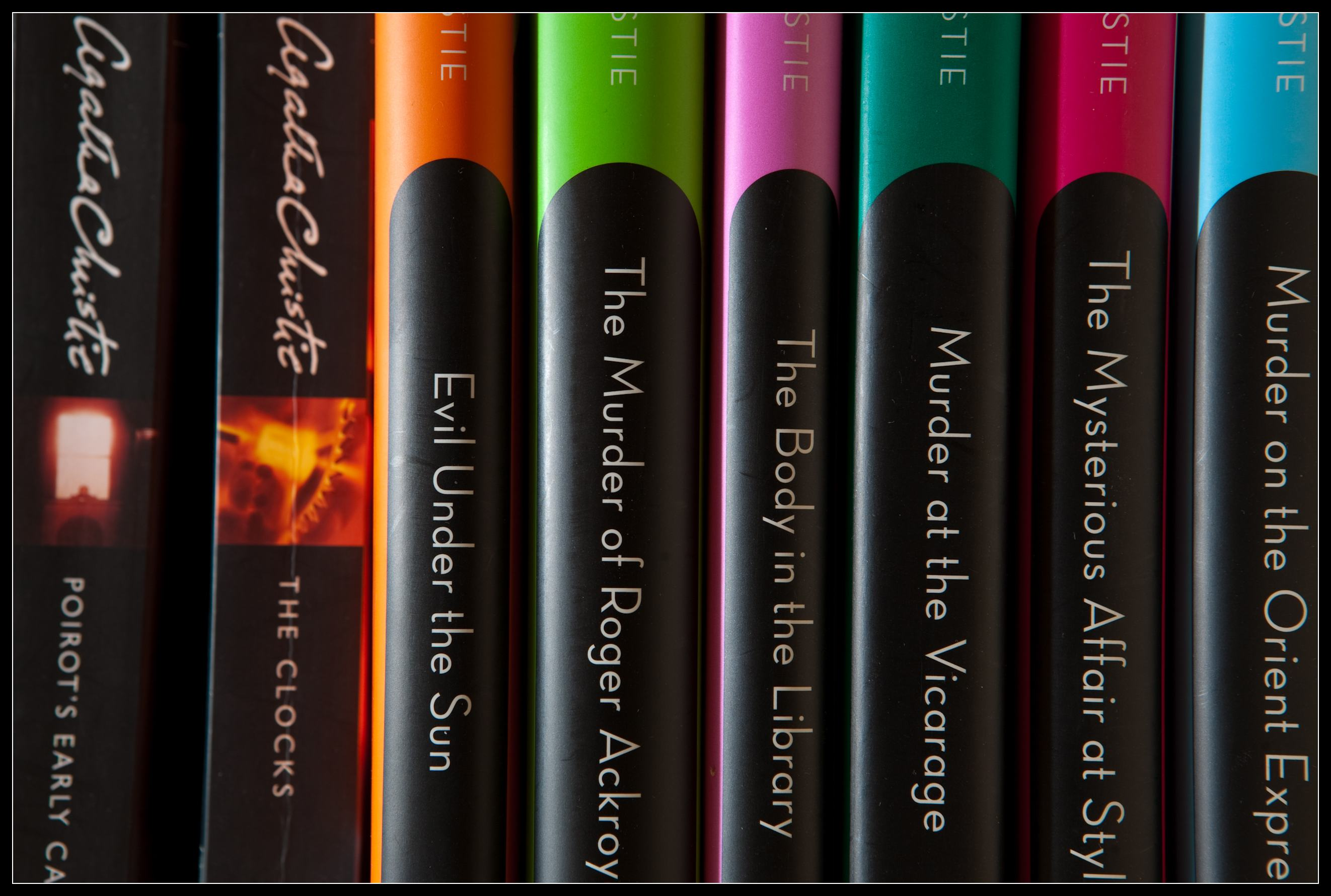
Novels by Agatha Christie

An early work of modern mystery fiction, Das Fräulein von Scuderi by E. T. A. Hoffmann (1819), was an influence on "The Murders in the Rue Morgue" by Edgar Allan Poe (1841) as may have been Voltaire's Zadig (1747). Wilkie Collins' novel The Woman in White was published in 1860, while The Moonstone (1868) is often thought to be his masterpiece. In 1887 Arthur Conan Doyle introduced Sherlock Holmes, whose mysteries are said to have been singularly responsible for the huge popularity in this genre. In 1905 Maurice Leblanc created gentleman burglar, Arsène Lupin, whose creative imagination rivaled the "deduction" of Sherlock Holmes, who was disparagingly included in some Lupin stories under obvious pseudonyms.

The genre began to expand near the turn of the century with the development of dime novels and pulp magazines. Books were especially helpful to the genre, with many authors writing in the genre in the 1920s. An important contribution to mystery fiction in the 1920s was the development of the juvenile mystery by Edward Stratemeyer. Stratemeyer originally developed and wrote the Hardy Boys and Nancy Drew mysteries written under the Franklin W. Dixon and Carolyn Keene pseudonyms respectively (and were later written by his daughter, Harriet Adams, and other authors). The 1920s also gave rise to one of the most popular mystery authors of all time, Agatha Christie, whose works include Murder on the Orient Express (1934), Death on the Nile (1937), and the world's best-selling mystery And Then There Were None (1939).

The massive popularity of crime-fiction titles among pulp magazines in the 1930s and 1940s reflected an increased interest in mystery fiction. Pulp magazines decreased in popularity in the 1950s with the rise of paperback books and television, and were supplanted for the most part by digest-sized-fiction magazines; of the U.S. newsstand digests, only two continue publishing today: Alfred Hitchcock's Mystery Magazine and Ellery Queen's Mystery Magazine—both now published by Must Read Magazines, a division of 1 Paragraph, Inc. The detective fiction author Ellery Queen (pseudonym of Frederic Dannay and Manfred B. Lee) is also credited with continuing interest in mystery fiction, with Dannay editing the magazine and taking an active role in encouraging scholarship in the literary field. A few larger-format newsstand magazines also continue publishing in the U.S., notably the revival of The Strand Magazine.

=== 21st century ===
Interest in mystery fiction continues to this day partly because of various television shows which have used mystery themes and the many juvenile and adult novels which continue to be published. There is some overlap with "thriller" or "suspense" novels and authors in those genres may consider themselves mystery novelists. Comic books and graphic novels have carried on the tradition, and film adaptations or the even-more-recent web-based detective series, have helped to re-popularize the genre in recent times.

== Classifications ==
=== Detective fiction ===
Though the origins of the genre date back to ancient literature and One Thousand and One Nights, the modern detective story as it is known today was invented by Edgar Allan Poe in the mid-19th century through his 1841 short story "The Murders in the Rue Morgue", which featured arguably the world's first fictional detective, C. Auguste Dupin. However, detective fiction was popularized only later, in the late 19th century, by Sir Arthur Conan Doyle's Sherlock Holmes stories, considered milestones in crime fiction.

The detective story shares some similarities with mystery fiction in that it also has a mystery to be solved, clues, red herrings, some plot twists along the way and a detective denouement, but differs on several points. Most of the Sherlock Holmes stories feature no suspects at all, while mystery fiction, in contrast, features a large number of them. As noted, detective stories feature professional and retired detectives, while mystery fiction almost exclusively features amateur detectives. Finally, detective stories focus on the detective and how the crime was solved, while mystery fiction concentrates on the identity of the culprit and how the crime was committed, a distinction that separated And Then There Were None from other works of Agatha Christie.

A common subgenre of detective fiction is the Whodunit. Whodunits experienced an increase in popularity during the Golden Age of Detective Fiction of the 1920s-1940s, when it was the primary style of detective fiction. This subgenre is classified as a detective story where the reader is given clues throughout as to who the culprit is, giving the reader the opportunity to solve the crime before it is revealed. During the Golden Age, whodunits were written primarily by women, however Wilkie Collins' The Moonstone is often recognized as one of the first examples of the genre.

=== True crime ===
True crime is a literary genre that recounts real crimes committed by real people, almost half focusing on serial killers. Criticized by many as being insensitive to those personally acquainted with the incidents, it is often categorized as trash culture. Having basis on reality, it shares more similarities with docufiction than the mystery genre. Unlike fiction of the kind, it does not focus much on the identity of the culprit and has no red herrings or clues, but often emphasizes how the culprit was caught and their motivations behind their actions.

=== Cozy mystery ===
Cozy mysteries began in the late 20th century as a reinvention of the Golden Age whodunit; these novels generally shy away from violence and suspense and frequently feature female amateur detectives. Modern cozy mysteries are frequently, though not necessarily in either case, humorous and thematic. This genre features minimal violence, sex and social relevance, a solution achieved by intellect or intuition rather than police procedure, with order restored in the end, honorable characters, and a setting in a closed community. The murders are often committed by less violent tools such as poison and the wounds inflicted are rarely if ever used as clues. The writers who innovated and popularized the genre include Agatha Christie, Dorothy L. Sayers and Elizabeth Daly.

=== Legal thriller ===
The legal thriller or courtroom novel is also related to detective fiction. The system of justice itself is always a major part of these works, at times almost functioning as one of the characters. In this way, the legal system provides the framework for the legal thriller as much as the system of modern police work does for the police procedural. The legal thriller usually starts its business with the court proceedings following the closure of an investigation, often resulting in a new angle on the investigation, so as to bring about an outcome different from the one originally devised by the investigators. In the legal thriller, court proceedings play a very active, if not to say decisive part in a case reaching its ultimate solution. Erle Stanley Gardner popularized the courtroom novel in the 20th century with his Perry Mason series. Contemporary authors of legal thrillers include Michael Connelly, Linda Fairstein, John Grisham, John Lescroart, Paul Levine, Lisa Scottoline and Scott Turow.

=== Police procedural ===
Many detective stories have police officers as the main characters. These stories may take a variety of forms, but many authors try to realistically depict the routine activities of a group of police officers who are frequently working on more than one case simultaneously, providing a stark contrast to the detective-as-superhero archetype of Sherlock Holmes. Some of these stories are whodunits; in others, the criminal is known, and the police must gather enough evidence to charge them with the crime.

In the 1940s the police procedural evolved as a new style of detective fiction. Unlike the heroes of Christie, Chandler, and Spillane, the police detective was subject to error and was constrained by rules and regulations. As Gary Huasladen says in his book Places for Dead Bodies, "not all the clients were insatiable bombshells, and invariably there was life outside the job." The detective in the police procedural does the things police officers do to catch a criminal. Writers of the genre include Ed McBain, P. D. James and Bartholomew Gill.

=== Howcatchem ===
An inverted detective story, also known as a "howcatchem", is a plot structure of murder mystery fiction in which the commission of the crime is shown or described at the beginning, usually including the identity of the perpetrator. The story then describes the detective's attempt to solve the mystery. There may also be subsidiary puzzles, such as why the crime was committed, and they are explained or resolved during the story. This format is the inversion of the more typical "whodunit", where all of the details of the perpetrator of the crime are not revealed until the story's climax.

=== Hardboiled fiction ===
Martin Hewitt, created by British author Arthur Morrison in 1894, is one of the first examples of the modern style of fictional private detective. This character is described as an "'Everyman' detective meant to challenge the detective-as-superman that Holmes represented."

By the late 1920s, Al Capone and the Mob were inspiring not only fear, but piquing mainstream curiosity about the American crime underworld. Popular pulp fiction magazines like Black Mask capitalized on this, as authors such as Carrol John Daly published violent stories that focused on the mayhem and injustice surrounding the criminals, not the circumstances behind the crime. Very often, no actual mystery even existed: the books simply revolved around justice being served to those who deserved harsh treatment, which was described in explicit detail." The overall theme these writers portrayed reflected "the changing face of America itself."

In the 1930s, the private eye genre was adopted wholeheartedly by American writers. One of the primary contributors to this style was Dashiell Hammett with his famous private investigator character, Sam Spade. His style of crime fiction came to be known as "hardboiled", which is described as a genre that "usually deals with criminal activity in a modern urban environment, a world of disconnected signs and anonymous strangers." "Told in stark and sometimes elegant language through the unemotional eyes of new hero-detectives, these stories were an American phenomenon." According to author Michael Connelly, "Chandler credited Hammett with taking the mystery out of the drawing-room and putting it out on the street where it belongs."

In the late 1930s, Raymond Chandler updated the form with his private detective Philip Marlowe, who brought a more intimate voice to the detective than the more distanced "operative's report" style of Hammett's Continental Op stories. Despite struggling through the task of plotting a story, his cadenced dialogue and cryptic narrations were musical, evoking the dark alleys and tough thugs, rich women and powerful men about whom he wrote. Several feature and television movies have been made about the Philip Marlowe character. James Hadley Chase wrote a few novels with private eyes as the main heroes, including Blonde's Requiem (1945), Lay Her Among the Lilies (1950), and Figure It Out for Yourself (1950). The heroes of these novels are typical private eyes, very similar to or plagiarizing Raymond Chandler's work.

Ross Macdonald, pseudonym of Kenneth Millar, updated the form again with his detective Lew Archer. Archer, like Hammett's fictional heroes, was a camera eye, with hardly any known past. "Turn Archer sideways, and he disappears," one reviewer wrote. Two of Macdonald's strengths were his use of psychology and his beautiful prose, which was full of imagery. Like other 'hardboiled' writers, Macdonald aimed to give an impression of realism in his work through violence, sex and confrontation. The 1966 movie Harper starring Paul Newman was based on the first Lew Archer novel The Moving Target (1949). Newman reprised the role in The Drowning Pool in 1976.

Michael Collins, pseudonym of Dennis Lynds, is generally considered the author who led the form into the Modern Age. His private investigator, Dan Fortune, was consistently involved in the same sort of David-and-Goliath stories that Hammett, Chandler, and Macdonald wrote, but Collins took a sociological bent, exploring the meaning of his characters' places in society and the impact society had on people. Full of commentary and clipped prose, his books were more intimate than those of his predecessors, dramatizing that crime can happen in one's own living room.

The PI novel was a male-dominated field in which female authors seldom found publication until Marcia Muller, Sara Paretsky and Sue Grafton were finally published in the late 1970s and early 1980s. Each author's detective, also female, was brainy and physical and could hold her own. Their acceptance, and success, caused publishers to seek out other female authors.

=== Historical mystery ===
These works are set in a time period considered historical from the author's perspective, and the central plot involves the solving of a mystery or crime (usually murder). Though works combining these genres have existed since at least the early 20th century, many credit Ellis Peters's The Cadfael Chronicles (1977–1994) for popularizing what would become known as the historical mystery.

=== Locked-room mystery ===
The locked-room mystery is a subgenre of detective fiction. The crime—almost always murder—is committed in circumstances under which it was seemingly impossible for the perpetrator to commit the crime and/or evade detection in the course of getting in and out of the crime scene. The genre was established in the 19th century. Poe's "The Murders in the Rue Morgue" (1841) is considered the first locked-room mystery; since then, other authors have used the scheme. John Dickson Carr was recognized as a master of the genre and his The Hollow Man was recognized by a panel of 17 mystery authors and reviewers as the best locked-room mystery of all time in 1981. The crime in question typically involves a crime scene with no indication as to how the intruder could have entered or left, i.e., a locked room. Following other conventions of classic detective fiction, the reader is normally presented with the puzzle and all of the clues, and is encouraged to solve the mystery before the solution is revealed in a dramatic climax.

=== Occult detective fiction ===
Occult detective fiction centers around the investigation of supernatural phenomena in the absence of or in concert with criminal investigation. Like cozy mysteries, the detective may be an amateur sleuth or otherwise not associated with the police. Supernatural elements typically occur in a world where magic is not diegetically usual, common, or expected; other stories such as Sir Arthur Conan Doyle's The Hound of the Baskervilles utilizes phenomena to misdirect the reader and investigator from a solution grounded in reality.

While the paranormal and occult are long-standing occurrences in fiction, Horace Walpole's 1764 The Castle of Otranto and its supernatural elements constituted a prominent influence for late 18th century literature and future works of occult mystery. Additions to the genre extend beyond written novels into television, podcasts, and videogames.
