= The Moving Target =

1949 novel by Ross Macdonald

- First edition
- Author: Ross Macdonald
- Cover artist: Bill English
- Language: English
- Series: Lew Archer
- Genre: Mystery
- Publisher: Knopf
- Publication date: 1949
- Publication place: United States
- Media type: Print (Hardcover, Paperback)
- Pages: 245
- Followed by: The Drowning Pool

The Moving Target is a detective novel by writer Ross Macdonald, first published by Alfred A. Knopf in April 1949.

== Plot ==
Lew Archer is a 35-year-old private eye based in Los Angeles. He is hired by the crippled wife of millionaire Ralph Sampson to discover what has happened to him since he disappeared after recently landing at Burbank Airport. Archer begins by interviewing Sampson's pilot Alan Taggert and his flirtatious daughter Miranda at their Santa Teresa villa before going downtown to talk to the family lawyer, Bert Graves, an old friend of Archer's from before World War 2. A lead takes him to Fay Estabrook, an aging Hollywood film star whom he later picks up during a night's drinking, but when he takes her home he is interrupted by Fay's husband, the gun-toting crook Dwight Troy.

On the way back, Archer drops in on a run-down bar called The Wild Piano and listens to a boogie performance by convicted addict Betty Fraley. When he starts questioning her about Sampson, she turns him over to a thug called Puddler and he is only saved from a bad beating by Taggert, who is also there on Sampson's trail. The following day Archer discovers that The Wild Piano's owner is Troy, who appears to be a crook down on his luck. He then drives to the Sampson home, where a letter has been received that makes it seem that Sampson has been kidnapped.

Among other things that emerge about Sampson is that Troy is his business associate and that he gifted a mountain hunting lodge to a religious cult leader called Claude as a temple. After Archer and Miranda go to search this for some trace of Sampson, a ransom demand arrives at the villa. Graves and Taggert arrange to drop the money while Archer waits to follow the kidnapper's car. However, its driver is shot and the other members of the gang get away.

While trying to find out more about the dead driver at a truck stop, a truck driven by Puddler draws up which Archer tails to Claude's mountain temple. Eventually it emerges that Sampson and Troy have been using it as a drop-off point to smuggle illegal Mexican immigrants over the border and then hire them out at low pay rates to local ranchers. Archer is captured there by Troy, who acts with surprise when he hears of the kidnap. Puddler drives him back down to a dock on the coast and is drowned in a fight while Archer returns to the villa. There he learns from Graves that the dead kidnapper was Betty Fraley's brother, Eddie; Taggert is revealed to be Betty's lover and complicit in Sampson's kidnapping. When Taggert tries to shoot Archer, he is shot instead by Graves.

Archer tracks down Eddie's sister, who is being tortured by Troy to reveal where Sampson is being held captive. Archer rescues her but is knocked unconscious from behind when he gets to the place. Graves arrives half an hour later to bring him round and they discover Sampson's body, strangled but still warm. On the drive back Archer accuses Graves of the murder. He had just married Miranda, who stood to inherit over a million dollars on her father’s death. Sickened at the realisation of how the lust for money has twisted all connected with the crime, Graves turns himself in.

== Background and creation ==
The Moving Target introduces the detective Lew Archer, who was eventually to figure in a further seventeen novels. Up to this point Macdonald had been writing under the name Kenneth Millar, but adopted the pseudonym John Macdonald for this one. His first drafts were begun in 1947, using the working title of The Snatch; its style was meant to be a refinement on hardboiled fiction, featuring a successor to Philip Marlowe. Macdonald's publisher was dissatisfied with the quality of the writing when it was first submitted and only accepted it after considerable revisions and a change of title. The new title derived from a conversation that Archer has in the novel with a young woman who describes the craving for excitement and risk-taking of her post-war generation as being like driving fast in hope of meeting "something utterly new. Something naked and bright, a moving target in the road."

For the book, Macdonald created the fictional city of Santa Teresa, heavily based on Santa Barbara, California where he lived in his later life. The city is portrayed as divided between a rich class corrupted by easy living who live in the canyons above it and a poor underclass, many of them non-white.

== Reception ==
Anthony Boucher greeted the novel enthusiastically in The New York Times Book Review: "Human compassion and literary skill returns the much-abused hard-boiled detective story to its original Hammet-high level." Raymond Chandler, on the other hand, dismissed Macdonald's literary homage in a private letter not published until 1962 as the work of a "literary eunuch".

== Adaptation ==
The novel became the basis for the 1966 Paul Newman film Harper, when Pocket Books retitled a reprint of the novel Harper without permission as part of the movie tie-in.

== Bibliography ==
Tom Nolan, Ross Macdonald, Scribner 1999
