= The Chill (Macdonald novel) =

1964 novel by Ross Macdonald

First US edition cover

The Chill is Ross Macdonald's eleventh Lew Archer novel, published by Alfred A. Knopf in their Borzoi series in 1964. Macdonald's reputation was now growing and the front cover bore the announcement "a new novel by the author of The Zebra Striped Hearse", which had been well received. After the book was published by Collins Publishers in the UK that year, it went on to gain the Silver Dagger award for 1964 from the British Crime Writers Association. A French translation also appeared in 1964, followed by a Danish translation the following year and an Italian translation in 1967.

== Plot ==
Archer is hired by Alex Kincaid to trace his wife Dolly, after she had left him on the first day of their honeymoon in Pacific Point. The detective soon traces her to the nearby college where she has enrolled as a student. There Dolly also acts as chauffeur for Mrs Bradshaw, whose son Roy is the college Dean. On the night of Archer's arrival, Dolly discovers the murdered body of Helen Haggerty, her college counsellor, and becomes hysterical. While Alex comforts Dolly, Archer contacts Dr Godwin, her former psychiatrist. Godwin immediately arranges for her to enter a clinic where she can be isolated from the predatory Sheriff Crane, who would like to convict her for Helen's murder.

Ten years before, Dolly had been manipulated into appearing as the principal witness when her father Thomas McGee was convicted of shooting her mother. After his release from San Quentin State Prison, McGee had contacted his daughter, protesting his innocence, and the trauma of this was what had caused her to run away. Archer now sets out to look into the background of the killing and begins to suspect a link between that, the murder of Helen Haggerty and the shooting of property developer Luke Deloney in the Chicago suburb of Bridgeton twenty years before. Helen's father, Police Lieutenant Earl Hoffman, had been in charge of the investigation but had been bullied into declaring it a case of suicide. That had caused a breach with his daughter, who knew differently.

Archer returns from Bridgeton via Reno, where his contacts Arnie and Phyllis Walters help him locate Jud Foley, a suspect that he and Roy Bradshaw had seen in the grounds on the night of Helen's murder. It eventually comes out that Jud had supplied Helen with information concerning Bradshaw's financial standing. She had then blackmailed Bradshaw in return for not revealing details of his affair with McGee's murdered wife years before. Knowing that Bradshaw is also staying in Reno, Archer visits his hotel room and discovers that he has secretly married his academic colleague Laura Sutherland and is living with her there. To be able to marry, he had earlier passed a summer in Reno so as to establish residence according to Nevada law and get a divorce from a marriage he made while still a student at Bridgeton to Letitia Macready.

Back in Pacific Point, Dr Goodwin questions Dolly under pentothal and learns further details about the nights of Mrs McGee's and of Helen's murders. For a while suspicion falls on Bradshaw, then shifts to his former wife, whom no one in Pacific Point has ever seen. Archer deduces at the last moment that she must be the woman Bradshaw has been passing off as his mother and that she was responsible for murdering his other sexual partners out of jealousy. Bradshaw had made it appear as if he meant to marry Helen; now that it is apparent that Laura is his real wife, her life is endangered. Bradshaw sets out to intercept Mrs Bradshaw and is killed when her car collides with his.

== "Writing well is the best revenge" ==
At the time he was writing The Chill, Macdonald was smarting from the criticism and ridicule of his work recently published in the posthumous Raymond Chandler Speaking (1962). Tom Nolan has even speculated in his biography of Macdonald that the portrayal of Roy Bradshaw's domestic situation was sarcastically based on Chandler's mother-fixation and late marriage to a woman twenty years his senior.

For Macdonald this novel had "my most horrible plot yet", structured around the Oedipus theme, the Freudian interpretation of which was significant to the author. His working title for the novel was "A Mess of Shadows", a phrase taken from the fourth stanza of the poem "Among School Children" by W. B. Yeats, in which the future is envisaged as shaped by mythical themes, as if it "took a mess of shadows for its meat".

Another theme of frustrated approximation, returned to several times in the novel, is Zeno's paradox of Achilles and the tortoise, first introduced in a conversation between students as Archer begins his investigation in Bradshaw's college. In a race between the athlete and the tortoise, the latter is given a start which Achilles halves at any given moment of time, but it can never be reached because the two are caught in an infinite series of adjustments. Such variations on the time theme were now becoming the main topic of Macdonald's novels, complicating Archer's efforts at detection.

A series of bitter social observations add one more layer of significance to the problems that Archer has to negotiate. When Alex's father tries to pull the detective off the case, Archer comments that "Kincaid was a frightened man who valued his status the way some previous generations valued their souls". In a tree-lined street of an exclusive Chicago suburb, "the light that filtered through their turning leaves on to the great lawns was the color of sublimated money". A divorcee's husband reluctant to make alimony payments is "a combination of Dracula, Hitler and Uriah Heep". Such judgments continue the attacks on small-minded types begun at the start of Macdonald's career in Blue City and reflect the frustrations of his youth.

== Bibliography ==
- Tom Nolan, Ross Macdonald: A Biography, Scribner 1999
