= Lew Archer =

- Lew Archer, as he appeared in volume 39 of Detective Conan
- First appearance: The Moving Target
- Last appearance: The Blue Hammer
- Created by: Ross Macdonald
- Portrayed by: Paul Newman; Peter Graves; Brian Keith; Harris Yulin; James Faulkner

In-universe information
- Gender: Male
- Occupation: Private detective
- Spouse: Sue Archer (divorced)
- Nationality: American

Lew Archer is a fictional character created by American-Canadian writer Ross Macdonald. Archer is a private detective working in Southern California. Between the late 1940s and the early '70s, the character appeared in 18 novels and a handful of shorter works as well as several film and television adaptations. Macdonald's Archer novels have been praised for introducing more literary themes and psychological depth to the hardboiled fiction genre. Critic John Leonard declared that Macdonald had surpassed the limits of crime fiction to become "a major American novelist", while author Eudora Welty was a fan of the series and carried on a lengthy correspondence with Macdonald. The editors of Thrilling Detective wrote: "The greatest P.I. series ever written? Probably."

== Profile ==
Initially, Lew Archer was similar to (if not completely a derivative of) Philip Marlowe, the pioneering sleuth created by Raymond Chandler in the 1930s. However, Macdonald eventually broke largely from that mold. Archer's principal difference from the tough Marlowe is that he is much more openly sensitive and empathetic. Also, whereas Chandler's books were primarily studies of Marlowe's character and code of honor, Macdonald used Archer as a lens to explore the relationships of the other characters in the novels. Macdonald wrote, "Certainly my narrator Archer is not the main object of my interest, nor the character with whose fate I am most concerned," nor the novels' "emotional center."

Another difference was that Marlowe prowled the city of Los Angeles during the 1940s, while Archer followed the populace outward and primarily worked the suburbs in the 1950s. Like Marlowe, Archer observes changing American society. In 1962's The Zebra-Striped Hearse, Archer hunts a missing girl who may be dead, possibly murdered. His path repeatedly crosses a group of young surfers who own a hearse painted whimsically in zebra stripes. To the youngsters, death is remote and funny. To the world-weary detective, it's close and grim.

Lew Archer is largely a cipher, rarely described. His background is most thoroughly explored in The Moving Target: he got his training with the Long Beach, California, Police Department, but left (Archer himself says he was "fired") after witnessing too much corruption. Subsequent novels mentioned details of Archer's life only in passing. In Black Money (1966) Archer mentions that he's about 50 years old, thus born circa 1916. In The Doomsters a sheriff mocks his 6'2" and blue eyes. As old failures plague him, we learn he once "took the strap away from my old man", that he was a troubled kid and petty thief redeemed by an old cop, that he sometimes drank too much, that his ex-wife's name is Sue, and he thinks of her often. During World War II, he served in military intelligence in the United States Army, again mentioned in The Doomsters.

Archer is sometimes depressed, often world-weary. An almost Greek sense of tragedy pervades the novels as the sins of omission and crimes of sometimes-wealthy parents are frequently visited upon their children, young adults whom Archer tries desperately to save from disaster. This use of Greek drama was deliberate, as in The Galton Case (1959) being based on a loose interpretation of the Oedipus myth. Tom Nolan in his Ross Macdonald, A Biography, wrote of the author, "Gradually he swapped the hard-boiled trappings for more subjective themes: personal identity, the family secret, the family scapegoat, the childhood trauma; how men and women need and battle each other, how the buried past rises like a skeleton to confront the present. He brought the tragic drama of Sophocles and the psychology of Freud to detective stories, and his prose flashed with poetic imagery." Philosophical references underlined the thoughtful tone of the novels, with The Chill (1964) having mentions of Parmenides, Heraclitus and Achilles and the tortoise, while Black Money (1966) briefly discusses Henri Bergson.

Two recurring characters of note are Arnie and Phyllis Walters, who appear in several of the novels and seem to enjoy a warm friendship with Archer. Arnie is a private detective in Reno, Nevada, about 470 miles north of Los Angeles, where Archer's investigations sometimes lead, due to Nevada then both having some of the most liberal marriage and divorce laws in the nation and being one of the only states with legalized casino gambling (and its associated organized crime presence).

Archer's name pays a double homage to Dashiell Hammett and Lew Wallace. Macdonald named the character after Miles Archer, Sam Spade's murdered partner in Hammett's The Maltese Falcon (1930), whereas Archer's first name was derived from Lew Wallace, the author of the novel Ben Hur (1880).

== Recognition ==
In the New York Times, biographer Tom Nolan wrote that "some critics ranked him [Macdonald] among the best American novelists of his generation" and included a blurb by William Goldman that the Archer books were "the finest series of detective novels ever written by an American".

Over his career, Macdonald was presented with several awards, primarily for his Lew Archer series. In 1964, the Mystery Writers of America awarded the author the Silver Dagger award for The Chill. Ten years later, he received the Grand Master Award from the Mystery Writers of America, and in 1982 he received "The Eye", the Lifetime Achievement Shamus Award from the Private Eye Writers of America. In 1982, he was awarded the Robert Kirsch Award (the Los Angeles Times Book Prize) by the Los Angeles Times for "an outstanding body of work by an author from the West or featuring the West."

== Books ==
=== Novels ===
1. The Moving Target (1949)
2. The Drowning Pool (1950)
3. The Way Some People Die (1951)
4. The Ivory Grin (1952; aka Marked for Murder)
5. Find a Victim (1954)
6. The Barbarous Coast (1956)
7. The Doomsters (1958)
8. The Galton Case (1959)
9. The Wycherly Woman (1961)
10. The Zebra-Striped Hearse (1962)
11. The Chill (1964)
12. The Far Side of the Dollar (1965)
13. Black Money (1966)
14. The Instant Enemy (1968)
15. The Goodbye Look (1969)
16. The Underground Man (1971)
17. Sleeping Beauty (1973)
18. The Blue Hammer (1976)

=== Short stories ===
- "Find the Woman" (June 1946, EQMM)
- "The Bearded Lady" (American Magazine, October 1948)
- "The Imaginary Blonde" (February 1953, Manhunt; AKA Gone Girl)
- "The Guilty Ones" (May 1953, Manhunt; AKA The Sinister Habit)
- "The Beat-Up Sister" (October 1953, Manhunt; AKA The Suicide)
- "Guilt-Edged Blonde" (January 1954, Manhunt)
- "Wild Goose Chase" (Ellery Queen's Mystery Magazine, July 1954)
- "Midnight Blue" (October 1960, Ed McBain's Mystery Magazine)
- "The Sleeping Dog" (April 1965, Argosy)

in three collections: The Name Is Archer, Lew Archer, Private Investigator, and Strangers in Town

== Adaptations ==
=== Film ===
The character has been adapted for visual media several times: Two feature films starring Paul Newman as "Lew Harper":

- Harper (1966, directed by Jack Smight) derived from the novel The Moving Target (1949)
- The Drowning Pool (1975, directed by Stuart Rosenberg) derived from the novel of the same title
- The Underground Man (1974, directed by Paul Wendkos) a television movie starring Peter Graves.
- Le Loup de la côte Ouest (2002, directed by Hugo Santiago, based on the short story "Guilt-Edged Blonde") starring James Faulkner as Lew Millar. (Alternate Title: The Wolf of the West Coast)

Random House Films made a deal in October 2011 to create a movie franchise of Ross Macdonald's detective Lew Archer with Silver Pictures and Warner Bros. Rights holder Stephen White and Random House Studio president Peter Gethers would be executive producers on the movies. This movie series would start adapting with the eighth book in the series, The Galton Case. From Silver Pictures, Andrew Rona and Alex Heineman will be executive producers with Joel Silver producing.

=== TV series ===
Archer, a 1975 NBC TV series (NBC) starring Brian Keith based on the character. It was cancelled after six episodes:

- "The Turkish Connection", aired 30 January 1975
- "The Arsonist", aired 6 February 1975
- "The Body Beautiful", aired 13 February 1975
- "Shades of Blue", aired 20 February 1975
- "The Vanished Man", aired 6 March 1975
- "Blood Money", aired 13 March 1975

=== Radio ===
- "Sleeping Beauty", aired 1 January 1996 on NPR starring Harris Yulin as Archer
- "The Zebra Striped Hearse", produced by KCRW starring Harris Yulin as Archer
