= Ross Macdonald =

American writer (1915–1983)

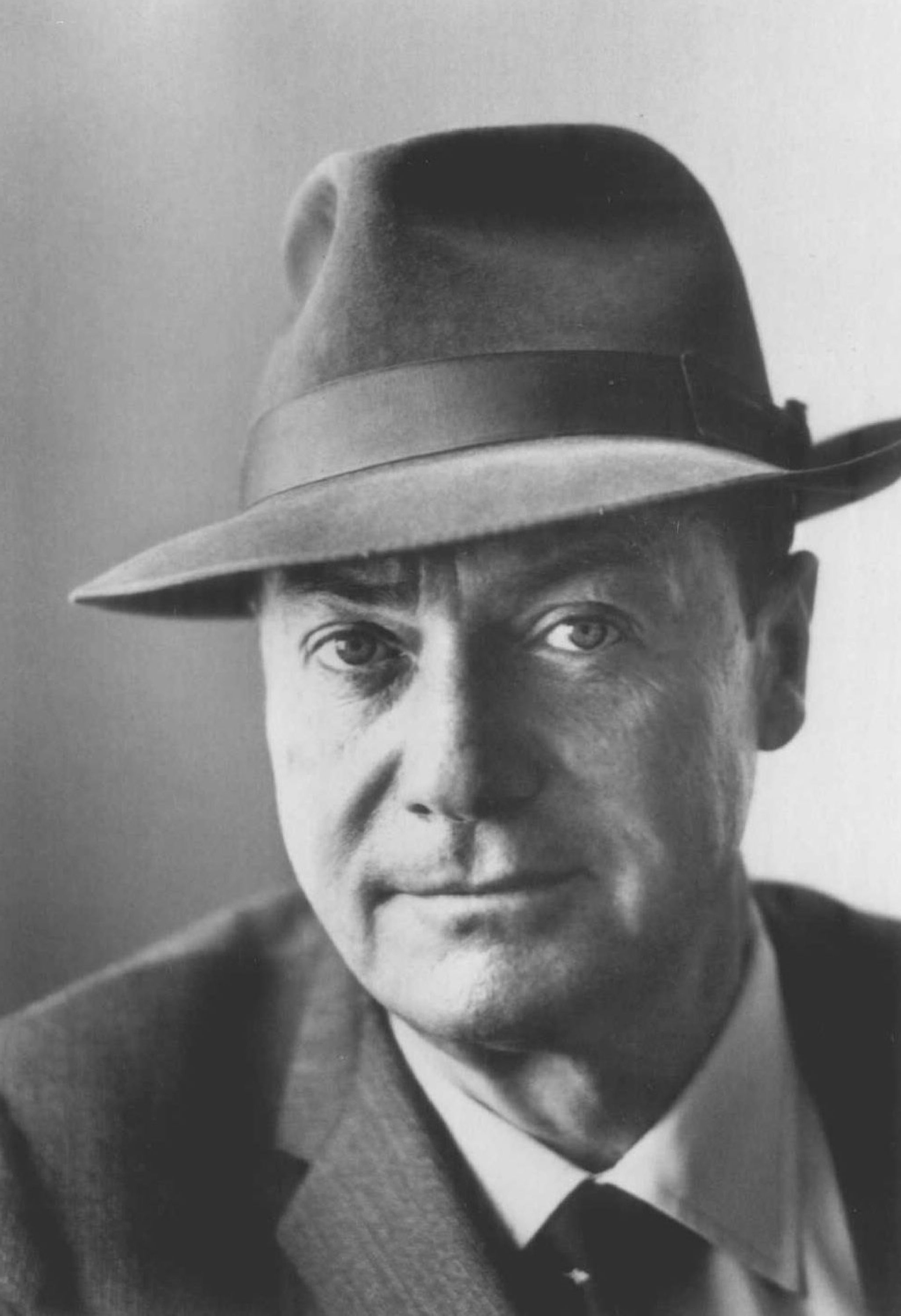
- Born: Kenneth Millar; December 13, 1915; Los Gatos, California, U.S.
- Died: July 11, 1983 (aged 67); Santa Barbara, California, U.S.
- Education: University of Western Ontario, University of Michigan
- Occupation: Novelist
- Spouse: Margaret Millar (m. 1938)
- Children: 1
- Writing career
- Pen name: John Macdonald, John Ross Macdonald, Ross Macdonald
- Genre: Crime fiction

Kenneth Millar (/ˈmɪlər/; December 13, 1915 – July 11, 1983), known mainly by the pseudonym Ross Macdonald, was an American-Canadian writer of crime fiction. He is best known for his series of hardboiled novels set in Southern California and featuring private detective Lew Archer. Since the 1970s, Macdonald's works (particularly the Archer novels) have received attention in academic circles for their psychological depth, sense of place, use of language, sophisticated imagery and integration of philosophy into genre fiction. Brought up in the province of Ontario, Canada, Macdonald eventually settled in the state of California, where he died in 1983.

The Wall Street Journal wrote that:

... it is the sheer beauty of Macdonald’s laconic style—with its seductive rhythms and elegant plainness—that holds us spellbound. "Hard-boiled," "noir," "mystery," it doesn’t matter what you call it. Macdonald, with insolent grace, blows past the barrier constructed by Dorothy Sayers between "the literature of escape" and "the literature of expression." These novels, triumphs of his literary alchemy, dare to be both.

== Life ==
Millar was born in Los Gatos, California, and raised in his Canadian parents' native Kitchener, Ontario. Millar was a Scots spelling of the surname Miller, and the author pronounced his name Miller rather than Millar. When his father abandoned the family unexpectedly when Millar was four years old, he and his mother lived with various relatives, and he had moved several times by his 16th year.

Back in Canada as a young adult, he graduated from the University of Western Ontario with an Honors degree in History and English. He found work as a high school teacher. Some years later, he attended the University of Michigan and received a PhD in 1952. He married Margaret Sturm in 1938, though they'd known each other earlier in high school. They had a daughter in 1939, Linda, who died in 1970. The family moved from Kitchener to Santa Barbara in 1946.

Millar began his career writing stories for pulp magazines and used his real name for his first four novels. Of these he completed the first, The Dark Tunnel, in 1944. After serving at sea as a naval communications officer from 1944 to 1946, Millar returned to Michigan, where he obtained his Ph.D. degree in literature. For his doctorate, Millar wrote a dissertation on Samuel Taylor Coleridge and studied under poet W. H. Auden. Unusual for a prominent literary intellectual of the era, Auden held mystery or detective fiction could rise to the level of literature and encouraged Millar's interest in the genre.

For his fifth novel, in 1949, he wrote under the name John Macdonald (his father's first and middle names) in order to avoid confusion with his wife, who was achieving her own success writing as Margaret Millar. He then changed his pen name briefly to John Ross Macdonald, before settling on Ross Macdonald (Ross borrowed from a favorite cousin) in order to avoid being confused with fellow mystery writer John D. MacDonald, who was writing under his real name. Millar would use the pseudonym Ross Macdonald on all his fiction from the mid '50s forward.

Most of his books were set primarily in and around his adopted hometown of Santa Barbara. In these works, the city where Lew Archer is based goes under the fictional name of Santa Teresa.

In 1983 Macdonald died of Alzheimer's disease.

== Work ==
Macdonald first introduced the tough but humane private eye Lew Archer in the 1946 short story "Find the Woman" (credited then to "Ken Millar"). A novel featuring him, The Moving Target, (1949) was the first in a series of eighteen. Macdonald mentions in the foreword to the Archer in Hollywood omnibus that his detective derives his name from Sam Spade's partner, Miles Archer, and from Lewis Wallace, author of Ben-Hur, though the character was patterned on Philip Marlowe. Macdonald also said the surname "Archer" was inspired by his own astrological sign of Sagittarius the archer.

The novels were hailed by genre fans and literary critics alike. He has been called the primary heir to Dashiell Hammett and Raymond Chandler as the master of American hardboiled mysteries.

Macdonald's writing built on the pithy style of his predecessors by adding psychological depth and insights into the motivations of his characters. His plots, described as of "baroque splendor", were complicated and often turned on Archer's unearthing family secrets of upwardly mobile clients, sometimes going back over several generations. Lost or wayward sons and daughters were a theme common to many of the novels. During adolescence, Macdonald engaged in petty crime and delinquency from school, and his own daughter Linda dropped out of college and disappeared for a week in 1959 only to be found living with an older man, events which he later said explained his sympathy for the troubled young adults often featured in his novels. Critics have commented favorably on Macdonald's deft combination of the two sides of the mystery genre, the "whodunit" and the psychological thriller. Even his regular readers seldom saw a Macdonald denouement coming.

Tom Nolan, Macdonald's biographer, wrote,

"By any standard he was remarkable. His first books, patterned on Hammett and Chandler, were at once vivid chronicles of a postwar California and elaborate retellings of Greek and other classic myths. Gradually he swapped the hard-boiled trappings for more subjective themes: personal identity, the family secret, the family scapegoat, the childhood trauma; how men and women need and battle each other, how the buried past rises like a skeleton to confront the present. He brought the tragic drama of Freud and the psychology of Sophocles to detective stories, and his prose flashed with poetic imagery."

== Recognition ==
The Lew Archer novels are recognized as some of the most significant American mystery books of the mid 20th century, bringing a literary sophistication to the genre. Literary critic John Leonard declared that Macdonald had surpassed the limits of crime fiction to become "a major American novelist". William Goldman, who adapted Macdonald's The Moving Target to film as Harper in 1966, called his works "the finest series of detective novels ever written by an American". A later film adaptation was The Drowning Pool (1975), also starring Paul Newman as the detective Lew Harper. In addition, The Underground Man was adapted as a TV movie in 1974.

Over his career, Macdonald was presented with several awards. In 1964, the Mystery Writers of America awarded him the Silver Dagger award for The Chill. Ten years later, he received the Grand Master Award from the Mystery Writers of America, and in 1982 he received "The Eye," the Lifetime Achievement Shamus Award from the Private Eye Writers of America. In 1982, he was awarded the Robert Kirsch Award by the Los Angeles Times for "an outstanding body of work by an author from the West or featuring the West."

== Published works ==
=== Writing as Kenneth Millar ===
- The Dark Tunnel (a.k.a. I Die Slowly) – 1944
- Trouble Follows Me (a.k.a. Night Train) – 1946
- Blue City – 1947 (filmed with Judd Nelson as Blue City, 1986)
- The Three Roads – 1948 (filmed with Michael Sarrazin as Deadly Companion, 1980)

These first four novels, all non-series standalones, were initially published using Millar's real name, but have since been intermittently reissued using his literary pseudonym, Ross Macdonald.

=== Other non-series novels ===
Two later non-series novels were also published:

- Meet Me at the Morgue (aka Experience With Evil) – 1953, credited to John Ross Macdonald
- The Ferguson Affair – 1960, credited to Ross Macdonald

=== Lew Archer ===
==== Novels ====
Title	Year	Highest NYT position reached	Number of weeks on NYT list	Notes
The Moving Target	1949	—	—	credited to John Macdonald, filmed with Paul Newman as Harper, 1966
The Drowning Pool	1950	—	—	also filmed with Paul Newman as The Drowning Pool, 1975
The Way Some People Die	1951	—	—	
The Ivory Grin	1952	—	—	aka Marked for Murder
Find a Victim	1954	—	—	
The Barbarous Coast	1956	—	—	
The Doomsters	1958	—	—	
The Galton Case	1959	—	—	
The Wycherly Woman	1961	—	—	
The Zebra-Striped Hearse	1962	—	—	
The Chill	1964	—	—	
The Far Side of the Dollar	1965	—	—	CWA Gold Dagger Award winner
Black Money	1966	—	—	
The Instant Enemy	1968	—	—	
The Goodbye Look	1969	#7	14	filmed as Tayna 1992
The Underground Man	1971	#4	17	filmed as a television series pilot in 1974
Sleeping Beauty	1973	#9	6	
The Blue Hammer	1976	—	—	

Source: The New York Times Best Seller list Figures are for the Adult Hardcover Fiction lists for the years of publication: highest position reached and total number of weeks on list (possibly nonconsecutive). A "—" indicates it did not make the list. Note that the Times list consisted of a Top 10 from 1973 through 1976, but a Top 15 in the covered years before that.

==== Short story collections ====
- The Name Is Archer (paperback original containing seven stories) – 1955
- Lew Archer: Private Investigator (The Name Is Archer + two additional stories) – 1977
- Strangers in Town (unpublished drafts edited by Tom Nolan) - 2001
- The Archer Files, The Complete Short Stories of Lew Archer Private Investigator, Including Newly Discovered Case Notes, ed. Tom Nolan – 2007.

==== Omnibuses ====
- Archer in Hollywood – 1967 includes The Moving Target, The Way Some People Die, and The Barbarous Coast.
- Archer at Large – 1970 includes The Galton Case, The Chill, and Black Money.
- Archer in Jeopardy – 1979 includes The Doomsters, The Zebra-Striped Hearse, and The Instant Enemy.
- Archer, P.I.—includes The Ivory Grin, The Zebra-Striped Hearse and The Underground Man. Mystery Guild, 1990. Collects three Vintage Crime/Black Lizard printings.
- Ross MacDonald: Four Novels of the 1950s - May 2015, Library of America, includes The Way Some People Die, The Barbarous Coast, The Doomsters, and The Galton Case.
- Ross MacDonald: Three Novels of the Early 1960s - April 2016, Library of America, includes The Zebra-Striped Hearse, The Chill and The Far Side of the Dollar.
- Ross MacDonald: Four Later Novels - July 2017, Library of America, includes Black Money, The Instant Enemy, The Goodbye Look, and The Underground Man

==== British omnibuses ====
Allison & Busby published three Archer omnibus editions in the 1990s.

- The Lew Archer Omnibus. Vol. 1. includes The Drowning Pool, The Chill and The Goodbye Look.
- The Lew Archer Omnibus. Vol. 2. includes The Moving Target, The Barbarous Coast, and The Far Side of the Dollar
- The Lew Archer Omnibus. Vol. 3. includes The Ivory Grin, The Galton Case, and The Blue Hammer.

=== Non-fiction ===
- On Crime Writing – 1973, Santa Barbara : Capra Press, Series title: Yes! Capra chapbook series; no. 11, The Library of Congress bibliographic information includes this note: "Writing The Galton case."
- Self-Portrait, Ceaselessly Into the Past – 1981, Santa Barbara : Capra Press, collection of book prefaces, magazine articles and interviews.
