= Bay Ridge, Brooklyn =

Neighborhood in New York City

Bay Ridge
- Neighborhood of Brooklyn
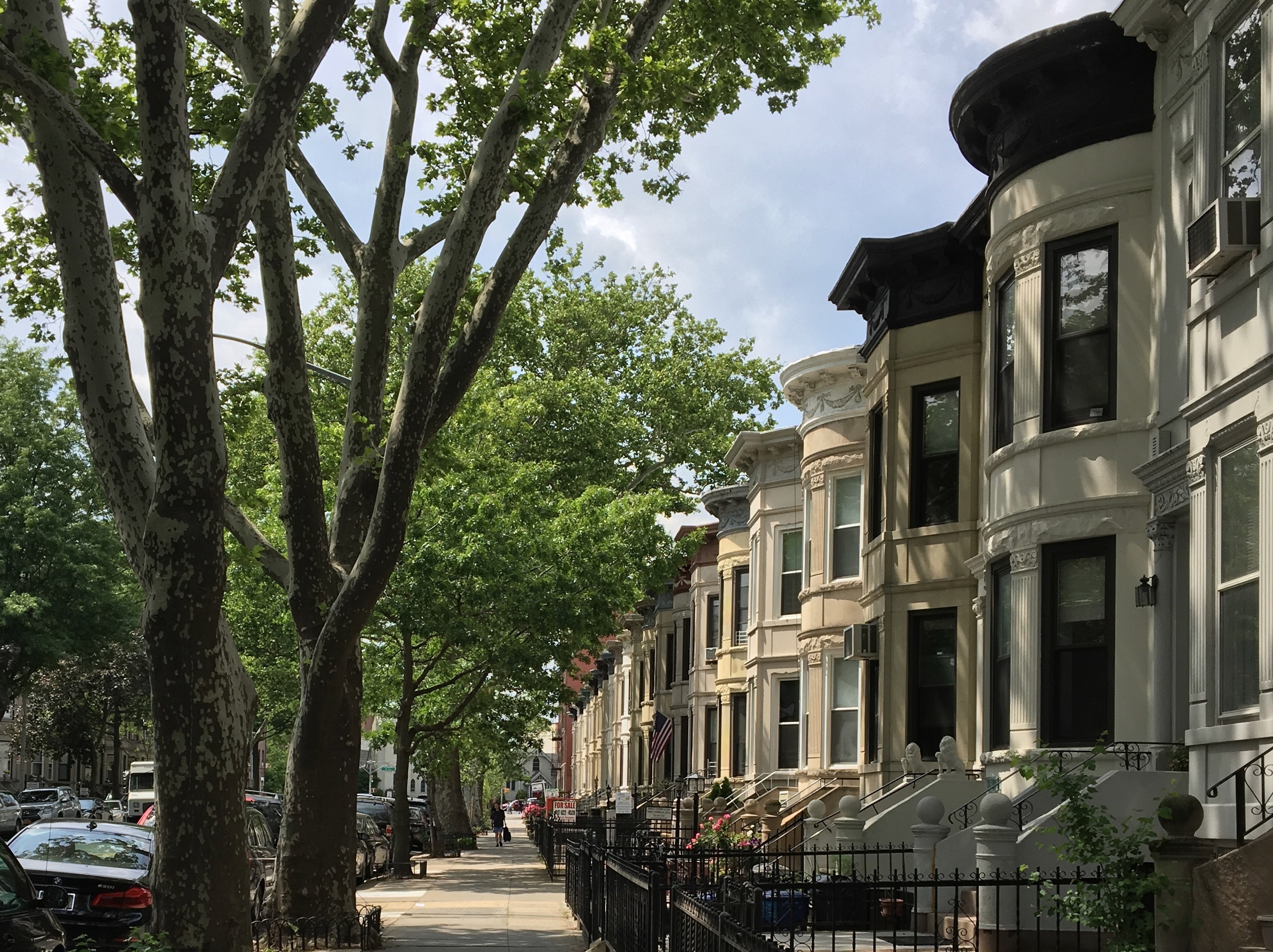
- Interactive map of Bay Ridge
- Coordinates: 40°37′53″N 74°01′40″W
- Country: United States
- State: New York
- City: New York City
- Borough: Brooklyn
- Community District: Brooklyn 10

Government
  - Congress: Dan Goldman (10th); Nicole Malliotakis (11th)

Area
  - Total: 2.12 sq mi (5.49 km^{2})
  - Land: 2.12 sq mi (5.49 km^{2})
  - Water: 0 sq mi (0 km^{2})

Population (2010)
  - Total: 79,371
  - Density: 37,400/sq mi (14,500/km^{2})

Race/Ethnicity
  - White: 68.7%
  - Hispanic: 13.9%
  - Asian: 12.2%
  - Black: 3.0%
  - Other: 2.1%
- Time zone: UTC−5 (Eastern)
  - Summer (DST): UTC−4 (EDT)
- ZIP Codes: 11209, 11220
- Area code: 718, 347, 929, and 917

Bay Ridge is a neighborhood in the southwest corner of the New York City borough of Brooklyn. It is bounded by Sunset Park to the north, Dyker Heights to the east, the Narrows and the Belt Parkway to the west, and Fort Hamilton Army Base and the Verrazzano–Narrows Bridge to the south. The section of Bay Ridge south of 86th Street is sometimes considered part of a sub-neighborhood called Fort Hamilton.

Bay Ridge was formerly the westernmost portion of the town of New Utrecht, comprising two smaller villages: Yellow Hook to the north and Fort Hamilton to the south. Yellow Hook was named for the color of the soil and was renamed Bay Ridge in December 1853 to avoid negative connotations with yellow fever at the time; the name Bay Ridge was chosen based on the local geography. Bay Ridge became developed as a rural summer resort during the mid-19th century. The arrival of the New York City Subway's Fourth Avenue Line (present-day R train) in 1916 led to its development as a residential neighborhood. Bay Ridge is known for its Norwegian community, though it also has Irish, Italian, Arab and Greek communities, with smaller populations of Chinese, Russian, and Eastern Europeans.

Bay Ridge is part of Brooklyn Community District 10, and its primary ZIP Codes are 11209 and 11220. It is patrolled by the 68th Precinct of the New York City Police Department. Politically, it is represented by the 47th District of the New York City Council.

== History ==
=== Early settlements ===
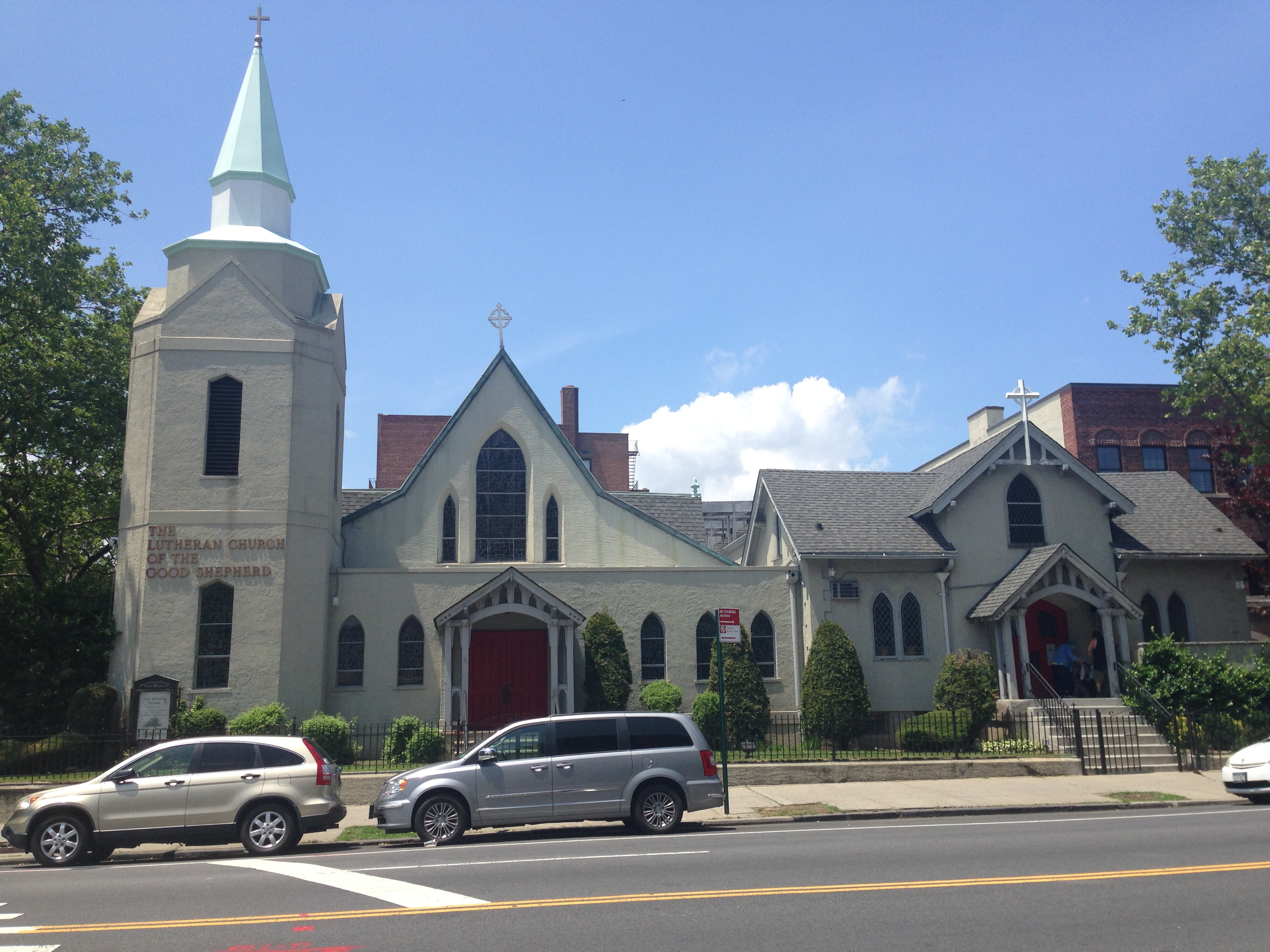
Lutheran Church of the Good Shepherd, Bay Ridge

South Brooklyn was originally settled by the Canarsee Indians, one of several indigenous Lenape peoples who farmed and hunted on the land. Their main village in the area was Nyack. The Canarsee Indians had several routes that crossed Brooklyn, including a path from Fulton Ferry along the East River that extended southward to Gowanus Creek, Sunset Park, and Bay Ridge. The Canarsee traded with other indigenous peoples, and by the early 17th century, also with Dutch and English settlers.

The first European settlement at Bay Ridge occurred in 1636 when Willem Adriaenszen Bennett and Jacques Bentyn purchased 936 acres (379 ha) between 28th and 60th Streets, in what is now Sunset Park. (Note: Until the 1960s, present-day Sunset Park was considered part of Bay Ridge.) However, after the land was purchased in the 1640s by Dutch settlers who laid out their farms along the waterfront, the Canarsee were soon displaced, and had left Brooklyn by the 18th century. Present-day Bay Ridge was the westernmost portion of New Utrecht, founded in 1657 by the Dutch. The area consisted of two sister villages: Yellow Hook to the north, named for the color of the soil, with "Hook" from the Dutch hoek, meaning "corner" and Fort Hamilton to the south, named for the military installation at its center.

Yellow Hook was mostly farmland until the late 1840s. In 1848, Third Avenue within the area was widened. Two years later, a group of artists moved to the area and founded a colony called Ovington Village, named after the family who owned the farmland in the area. Around 1853, Yellow Hook changed the community's name to avoid association with yellow fever. "Bay Ridge" was suggested by local horticulturist James Weir after the area's most prominent geographic features: the high ridge that offered views of New York Bay. The natural beauty attracted the wealthy, who built country homes along Shore Road, overlooking the water.

The first settlers referred to Fort Hamilton as the Nyack Tract, after the Native American tribe that lived there. Fort Hamilton began to develop in the 1830s as a resort destination when the corresponding military fortification was created. The mostly immigrant laborers in the area started to create a community to the fort's north and west, which included stores, houses, churches, and a school. The community was linked by stagecoach to New Utrecht, Gowanus, and downtown Brooklyn, as well as by ferry to Staten Island and Manhattan.

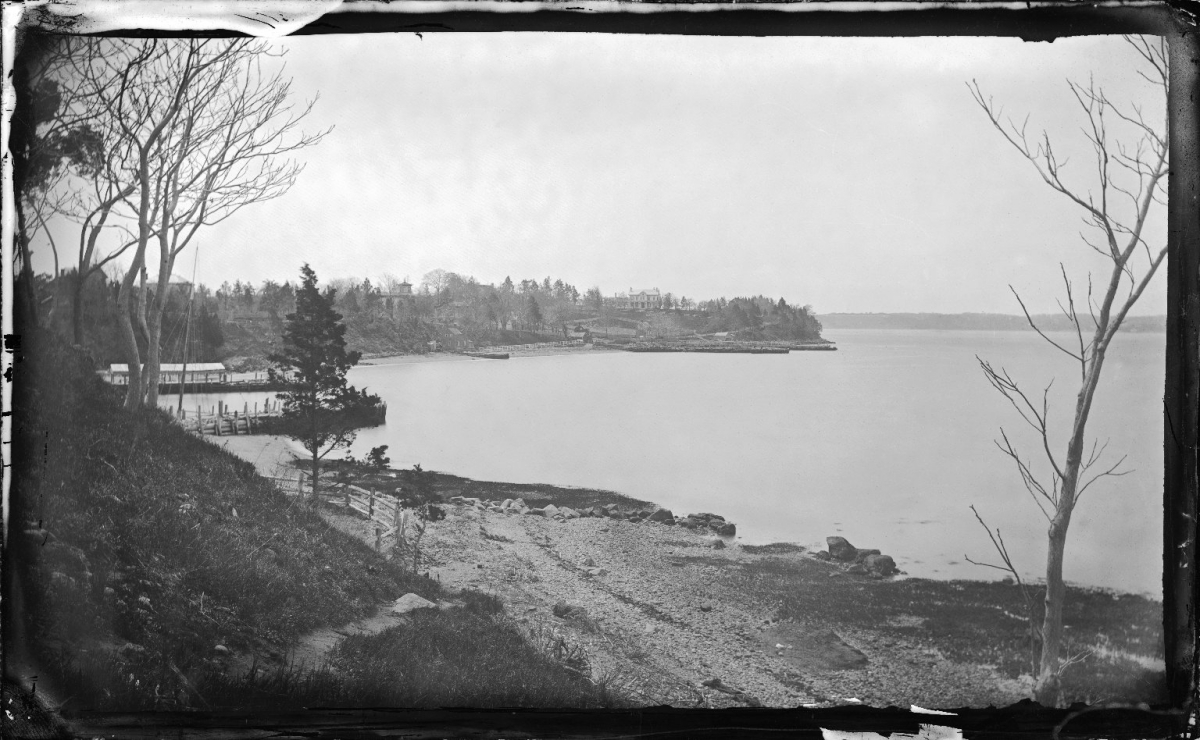
George Bradford Brainerd, Bay Ridge, c. 1872 – c. 1887 Brooklyn Museum

In the mid-19th century, a large number of country houses were built in Bay Ridge, especially along Shore Road, which faced the New York Harbor to the west. The advent of the telephone allowed estate owners to communicate with their businesses in Manhattan while enjoying their stays at the elegant estates of Bay Ridge. Through this period Greek Revival, Italianate, and Gothic Revival villas were built on Shore Road; many of these villas were constructed by the descendants of the area's original settlers. Development in Bay Ridge continued through the 1890s. One of the most prominent organizations in Bay Ridge was the Crescent Athletic Club, a football club built in 1884, which contained a summer clubhouse, boathouse, and playing fields. By the late 19th century, it was anticipated that a series of parkways would be built across Brooklyn, connecting Bay Ridge to Eastern Parkway, Ocean Parkway, and Prospect Park. As such, several wide, tree-lined streets were laid through the neighborhood, including 75th Street (now Bay Ridge Parkway); Fort Hamilton Parkway; and Shore Road. (Note: The name "Bay Ridge Parkway" was originally used to refer to a route that ran on 67th Street and then Shore Road. It currently refers to the street located between 74th and 76th Streets.)

=== Rapid development and subway construction ===
Until the late 19th century, Bay Ridge would remain a relatively isolated rural area, reached primarily by stagecoaches, then by steam trolleys after 1878. In 1892, the first electric trolley line was built in Brooklyn, starting at a ferry terminal at 39th Street and running via Second Avenue to 65th Street, and then via Third Avenue. The Fifth Avenue Elevated was then extended to Third Avenue and 65th Street. This had the effect of raising land prices: one entity, the Bay Ridge Improvement Company, was able to buy land for $1,000 per acre ($2,500/ha) in 1890, and then sell land off for $1,000 per lot several years later.

Real estate speculation commenced at the beginning of the 20th century. A building boom in South Brooklyn started in about 1902 and 1903, and thousands of people started coming to the area from Manhattan and from other places. The first definite plans for a Fourth Avenue subway (today's R train) were proposed by Rapid Transit Commission engineer William Barclay Parsons in 1903, and two years later, a citizens' committee was created to aid the creation of the subway line. The announcement of the subway line resulted in the immediate development of row houses in Bay Ridge. In 1905 and 1906 realty values increased by about 100 percent, and land values increased due to the promise of improved transportation access. Such was the rate of development that houses were being sold before they were even completed, and land prices could rise significantly just within several hours.

The subway itself faced delays. In 1905, the Rapid Transit Commission adopted the Fourth Avenue route to Fort Hamilton; following approval by the Board of Estimate and mayor of New York City, the route was approved by the Appellate Division of the Supreme Court. Bids for construction and operation were let, but in 1907, the Rapid Transit Commission was succeeded by the Public Service Commission (PSC). For much of 1908, there were legal disagreements about whether the project could be funded while remaining within the city's debt limit. The PSC voted unanimously for the Fourth Avenue subway line in March 1908, but the Board of Estimate did not approve contracts for the line until October 1909. By then, a non-partisan political body, with the backing of 25,000 South Brooklyn residents, was created that would only support candidates in the municipal election that pledged support for the Fourth Avenue subway. Groundbreaking for the first section of the subway, between DeKalb Avenue and 43rd Street took place in 1909. Not long after the contracts were awarded, the PSC started negotiating with the Brooklyn Rapid Transit Company and the Interborough Rapid Transit Company in the execution of the Dual Contracts, which were signed in 1913. During the Dual System negotiations, the construction of an extension of the Fourth Avenue subway was recommended as part of the Dual System, which was approved in 1912. Construction began on the sections between 61st–89th Streets and between 43rd–61st Streets in 1913, and was completed two years later.

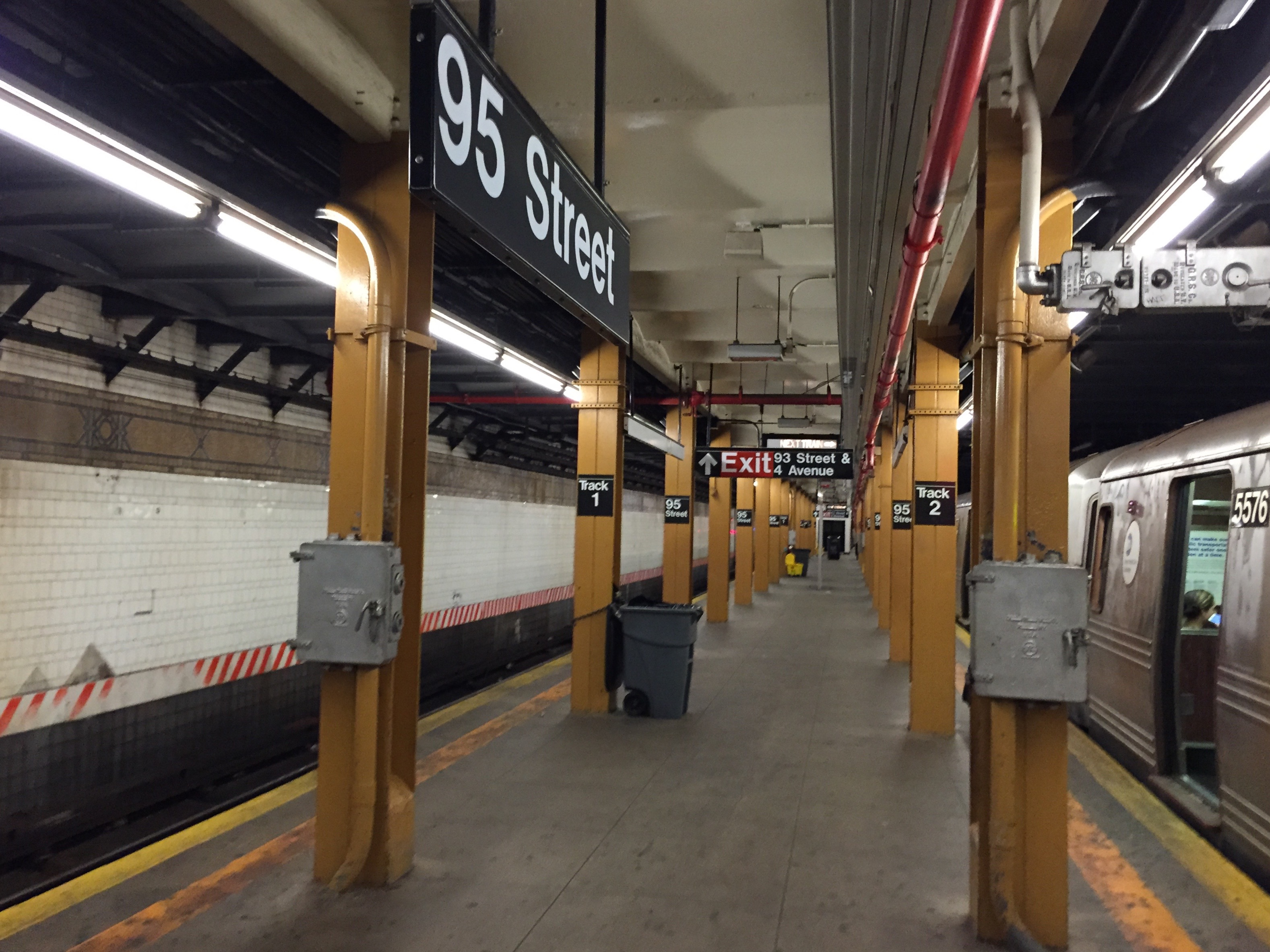
The Bay Ridge–95th Street terminal station of the BMT Fourth Avenue Line was opened in 1925.

The line opened to 59th Street on June 21, 1915, and was extended to 86th Street on January 15, 1916, at which time development started to accelerate. At the time, Bay Ridge extended northward to what is now present-day Sunset Park. Industrial developments were constructed along the waterfront north of present-day 65th Street, such as Bush Terminal (now Industry City), and those were considered to be within Bay Ridge. By the 1920s, the number of apartment buildings had increased fivefold, replacing old farms, homesteads and houses. Schools, churches, stores, movie theaters, and other structures were also created to serve the growing population. The Fourth Avenue subway was extended further to Bay Ridge–95th Street in 1925, by which point Bay Ridge's population had more than doubled since 1900. By World War II, almost all of these large houses had been replaced with apartment buildings.

In the nineteenth and early twentieth centuries, many Norwegian and Danish sailors emigrated to Brooklyn, including Bay Ridge and neighboring Sunset Park; Lapskaus Boulevard, referring to the salted Norwegian beef stew, is the nickname of Eighth Avenue in this area.

=== Staten Island connection and later years ===
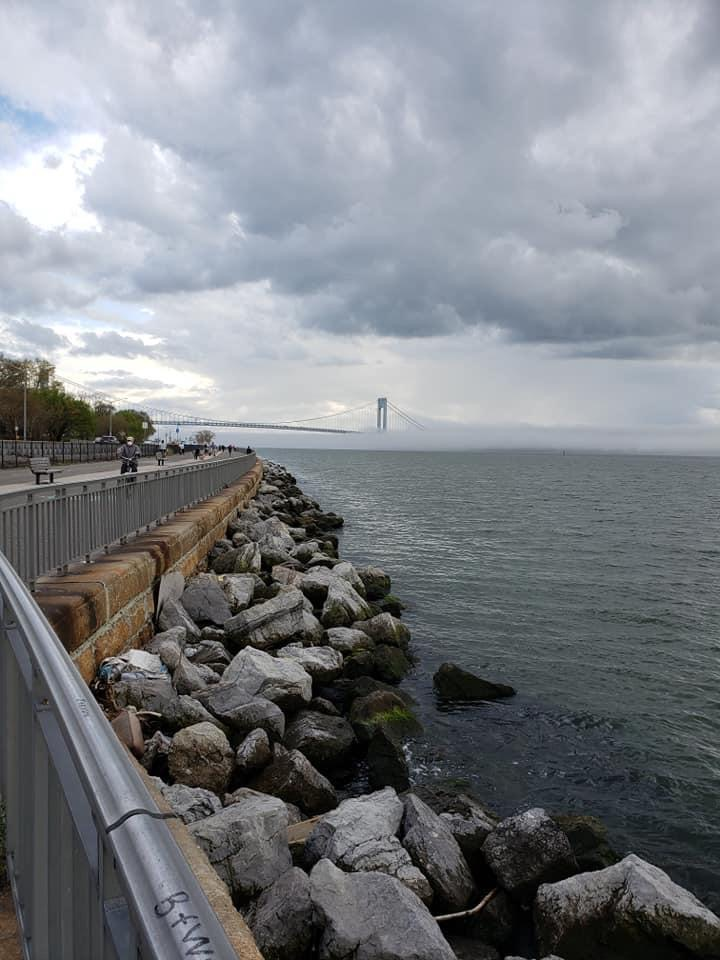
The Verrazzano Bridge on a foggy day

There had been plans to build the Staten Island Tunnel, a railroad or subway tunnel, from Bay Ridge to Staten Island as early as 1890. By the 1910s, there were two proposals to build a tunnel splitting from the Fourth Avenue subway in Bay Ridge, either at Fort Hamilton or between 65th and 67th Streets. The plan for the tunnel from 65th-67th Streets was ultimately selected and work started in 1923, though the project was halted two years later. In 1927, two years after the cancellation of the Staten Island Tunnel, engineer David B. Steinman brought up the possibility of constructing a vehicular bridge, the "Liberty Bridge", across the Narrows. The tunnel proposal was also revived with the announcement of the Liberty Bridge, and proposals for vehicular and rail tunnels were both considered. The bridge was disapproved by the United States Department of War in 1934, and plans for a bridge were revived in 1936. By the time the bridge was approved by the city's Board of Estimate in 1943, residents of Bay Ridge had turned against it, citing a detrimental impact to the neighborhood's character.

Robert Moses, the chairman of the Triborough Bridge and Tunnel Authority (TBTA), announced the revival of plans for what would become the Verrazzano–Narrows Bridge in 1947. U.S. Representative Donald Lawrence O'Toole, whose constituency included Bay Ridge, opposed the proposal for the bridge in part because he believed it would damage the character of Bay Ridge. The U.S. military approved the proposal anyway, and in 1957, Moses proposed expanding Brooklyn's Gowanus Expressway and extending it to the Narrows Bridge by way of Seventh Avenue, which would require cutting through the middle of Bay Ridge. This proposal drew opposition from the community, who wanted the approach to follow the Belt Parkway along the Brooklyn shore. After holding a hearing for concerned Bay Ridge residents, the Board of Estimate affirmed the Narrows Bridge plan in October 1958, though this angered Bay Ridge residents since the construction of the approach would displace 7,500 people. Also destroyed was Fort Lafayette, part of New York City's defense system along with Fort Hamilton and Fort Wadsworth in Staten Island; it was replaced by the base of the bridge's east tower. The Verrazzano–Narrows Bridge opened in 1964.

The 2007 Brooklyn tornado hit this area, specifically 68th Street and Bay Ridge Avenue between Third and Fourth Avenues. Eleven houses had to be vacated after they suffered significant damage, and many of the trees on the two blocks toppled, landing on cars and stoops. The 4th Avenue Presbyterian Church had its very large stained glass window blown out. As the tornado lifted, it peeled the roof of a nearby Nissan dealership and deforested 40% of Leif Ericson Park. The tornado has been rated EF2 on the Enhanced Fujita scale, with winds between 111 and 135 MPH.

== Demographics ==
Based on data from the 2020 United States census, the population of Bay Ridge was 111,952, an increase of 32,581 from the 79,371 counted in the 2010 Census, representing an increase of 41.04% and an increase of 31,413 (39%) from the 80,539 counted in 2000. Covering an area of 1,571.96 acres (636.15 ha), the neighborhood had a population density of 50.5 inhabitants per acre (32,300/sq mi; 12,500/km^{2}).

As of the 2010 US Census, the racial makeup of the neighborhood was 68.7% White (75,976), 13.9% Hispanic (15,413), 12.2% (13,509) Asian, 3.0% Black (3,358), 1.8% (2,015) from two or more races, and 0.3% (335) as other races.

The entirety of Community Board 10 had 142,075 inhabitants as of NYC Health's 2018 Community Health Profile, with an average life expectancy of 83.1 years. This is higher than the median life expectancy of 81.2 for all New York City neighborhoods. The median age is 38, while 20% are between the ages of 0–17, 34% between 25 and 44, and 25% between 45 and 64. The ratio of college-aged and elderly residents was lower, at 7% and 15% respectively.

As of 2020, the median household income was $105,177. In 2018, an estimated 19% of Bay Ridge and Dyker Heights residents lived in poverty, compared to 21% in all of Brooklyn and 20% in all of New York City. One in twelve residents (8%) were unemployed, compared to 9% in the rest of both Brooklyn and New York City. Rent burden, or the percentage of residents who have difficulty paying their rent, is 49% in Bay Ridge and Dyker Heights, slightly lower than the citywide and boroughwide rates of 52% and 51% respectively. Based on this calculation, as of 2018, Bay Ridge and Dyker Heights are considered to be high-income neighborhoods relative to the rest of the city.

According to the 2020 census data from New York City Department of City Planning, Bay Ridge had 40,000 or more White residents, while its Asian and Hispanic populations each had between 10,000 and 19,999 residents.

== Climate ==
Bay Ridge, Brooklyn falls under different climate types depending on the climate classification system used. However, the Köppen climate classification system is the most widely used climate classification scheme.

Bay Ridge, Brooklyn Climate according to major climate systems
Climatic scheme	Initials	Description
Köppen system	Cfa	humid subtropical climate
Trewartha system	Do	Temperate oceanic climate
Alisov system	—N/a	Temperate climate (Note: Mid-latitude temperate maritime climate)
Strahler system	—N/a	Moist continental climate
Thornthwaite system	C2 B'1	Moist subhumid
Neef system	—N/a	Temperate climate

Bay Ridge, Brooklyn

Climate chart (precipitation, max. and min. temperature)
J	F	M	A	M	J	J	A	S	O	N	D
0 37 31	0 40 33	0 48 39	0 60 49	0 70 59	0 78 68	0 84 75	0 82 72	0 76 66	0 64 55	0 52 45	0 43 38
- █ Average max. and min. temperatures in °F
- █ Precipitation totals in inches
Metric conversion
J	F	M	A	M	J	J	A	S	O	N	D
0 3 −1	0 5 1	0 9 4	0 15 9	0 21 15	0 26 20	0 29 24	0 28 22	0 24 19	0 18 13	0 11 7	0 6 3
- █ Average max. and min. temperatures in °C
- █ Precipitation totals in mm

Climate data for Bay Ridge, 2010-2022 normals
Month	Jan	Feb	Mar	Apr	May	Jun	Jul	Aug	Sep	Oct	Nov	Dec	Year
Record high °F (°C)	68 (20)	77 (25)	81 (27)	90 (32)	92 (33)	96 (36)	102 (39)	95 (35)	96 (36)	92 (33)	75 (24)	71 (22)	102 (39)
Mean maximum °F (°C)	57.0 (13.9)	59.7 (15.4)	69.2 (20.7)	80.0 (26.7)	88.3 (31.3)	90.2 (32.3)	94.5 (34.7)	91.5 (33.1)	89.8 (32.1)	79.6 (26.4)	69.2 (20.7)	61.3 (16.3)	95.4 (35.2)
Mean daily maximum °F (°C)	37.2 (2.9)	40.2 (4.6)	48.3 (9.1)	59.5 (15.3)	69.7 (20.9)	77.9 (25.5)	84.0 (28.9)	82.1 (27.8)	75.9 (24.4)	64.1 (17.8)	52.1 (11.2)	43.2 (6.2)	61.2 (16.2)
Daily mean °F (°C)	34.1 (1.2)	36.6 (2.6)	43.7 (6.5)	54.3 (12.4)	64.6 (18.1)	73.2 (22.9)	79.4 (26.3)	77.3 (25.2)	71.0 (21.7)	59.8 (15.4)	48.7 (9.3)	40.6 (4.8)	56.9 (13.9)
Mean daily minimum °F (°C)	31.0 (−0.6)	33.0 (0.6)	39.1 (3.9)	49.0 (9.4)	59.4 (15.2)	68.4 (20.2)	74.7 (23.7)	72.4 (22.4)	66.1 (18.9)	55.4 (13.0)	45.3 (7.4)	38.0 (3.3)	52.7 (11.5)
Mean minimum °F (°C)	10.5 (−11.9)	14.3 (−9.8)	22.5 (−5.3)	34.5 (1.4)	46.2 (7.9)	55.8 (13.2)	65.1 (18.4)	63.5 (17.5)	53.7 (12.1)	40.2 (4.6)	28.9 (−1.7)	22.4 (−5.3)	8.6 (−13.0)
Record low °F (°C)	3 (−16)	−1 (−18)	14 (−10)	27 (−3)	35 (2)	51 (11)	61 (16)	61 (16)	49 (9)	33 (1)	16 (−9)	13 (−11)	−1 (−18)

== Community ==
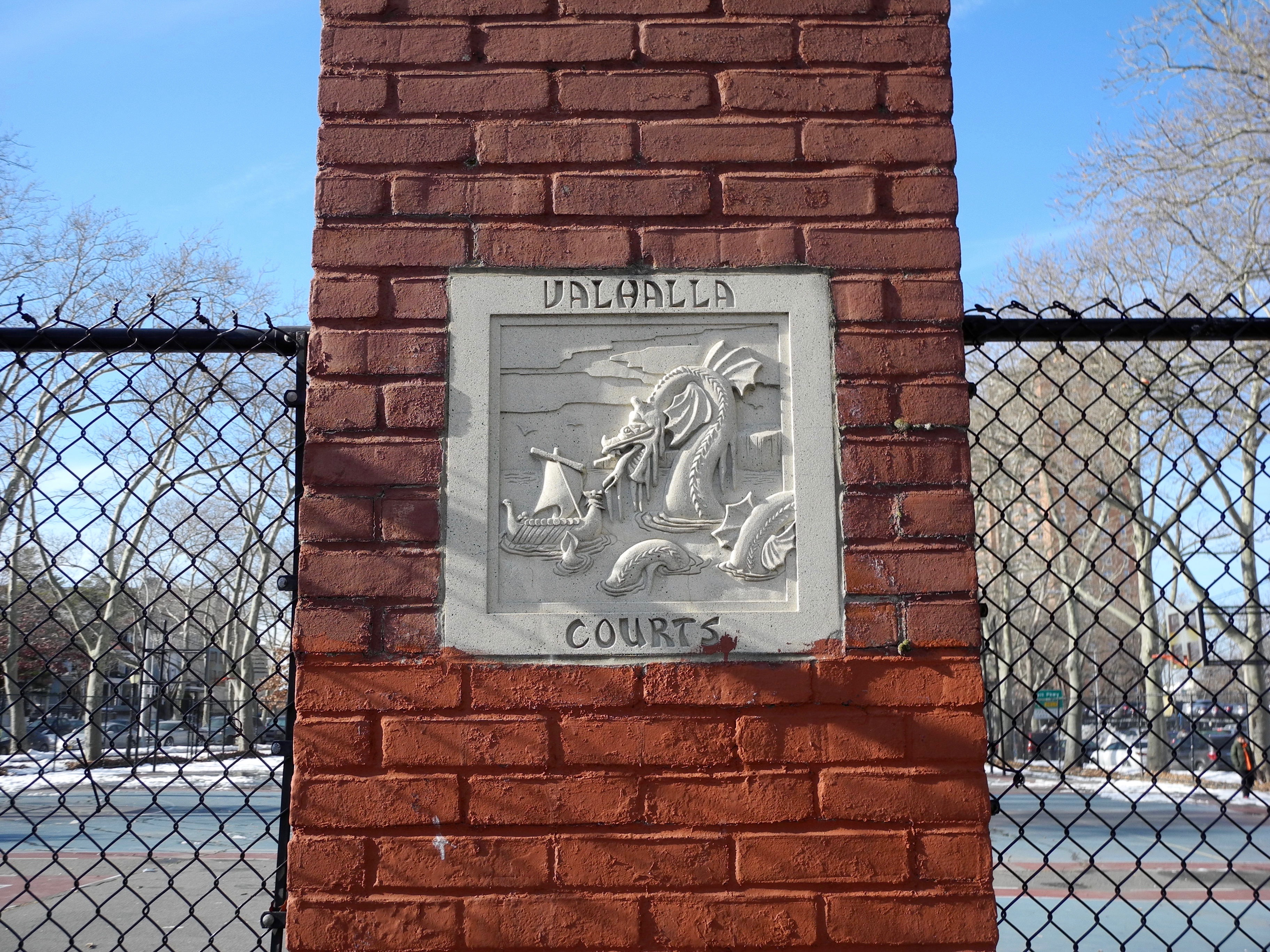
Bay Ridge's Norwegian heritage is represented in the Valhalla Courts.

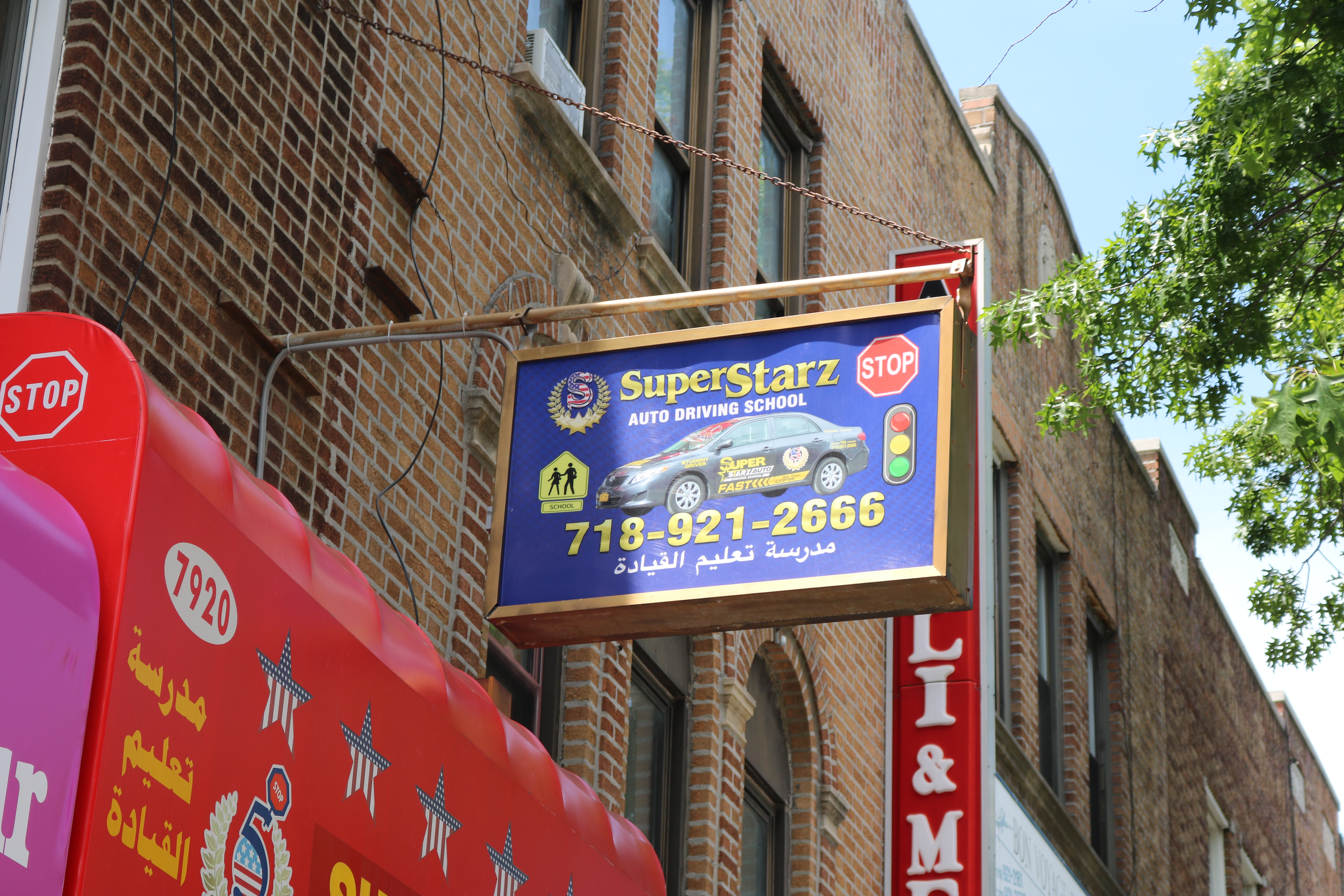
A sign including Arabic on 79th street in Bay Ridge

Bay Ridge is well known for its Norwegian community. By 1971, the 55,000-strong Norwegian community of Bay Ridge boasted that it was the fourth-largest Norwegian "city" in the world. Residents also compared Eighth Avenue's string of Norwegian businesses to Oslo's Karl Johans gate. The community continues to host the annual Norwegian Constitution Day Parade, also known as the Syttende Mai Parade, in which hundreds of people in folk dress proceed down Third Avenue. The celebration ends in Leif Ericson Park, where "Miss Norway" is crowned near the statue of Leif Ericson. The statue was donated by Crown Prince Olav, Prince of Norway, on behalf of the nation of Norway in 1939. Nordic Delicacies, a Norwegian gifts-and-groceries store, operated until 2015.

As of 2023, Bay Ridge still maintains a sizable Norwegian population at around 30,000 individuals. It also has Swedish and Danish communities. Later in the 20th century, like other areas in southern and southwestern Brooklyn, there was an increase in the number of Irish, Italian, Greek, Russian, Polish, Jordanians, Lebanese, Syrian, Egyptian and to a lesser extent Chinese people living in Bay Ridge. In the late 20th and early 21st centuries, Middle Eastern, North African, and Arab Americans moved to Bay Ridge, with The New York Times referring to it as "the heart of Brooklyn's Arab community". The neighborhood also has many Muslim residents, particularly in its northern area bordering the Sunset Park neighborhood. Bay Ridge is one of the largest Arab-American communities in the United States, and the largest in New York City.

In addition to the large Scandinavian, Irish, Italian, and Arab American communities, there are sizable numbers of Puerto Ricans, Mexicans, and—to a lesser extent—Central Americans and Dominicans in Bay Ridge.

Bay Ridge has many ethnic restaurants, especially along Third and Fifth Avenues, its main commercial strips.

Bay Ridge has a large elderly population. It has been called a naturally occurring retirement community (NORC) as many of its families have grown up in the neighborhood while their children moved away. In 2006, it was reported that 20% of the population of Bay Ridge was 60 years of age or more.

=== News ===
Local newspapers include The Home Reporter, Sunset News, The Bay Ridge Courier, and Bay Ridge News. The neighborhood is also often covered by The Brooklyn Daily Eagle. These newspapers publish other local offshoots: The Home Reporter also publishes The Spectator; the Courier's parent company also publishes The Brooklyn Paper; and the Eagle publishes a weekly digest called Bay Ridge Life.

=== Development ===
Bay Ridge Theatre on 3rd Avenue at 72nd Street had been redeveloped for commercial use by 2025.

In the 1990s and 2000s, many decades-old two-family houses were demolished and replaced by condominiums known colloquially as "Fedder Homes", after the branded air conditioners poking out from the buildings' facades. In 2005, local community leaders and community activists from across the political spectrum united to issue rezoning laws. The six-story apartment complexes lining Shore Road are among the tallest buildings in the neighborhood.

== Landmarks ==
=== Points of interest ===
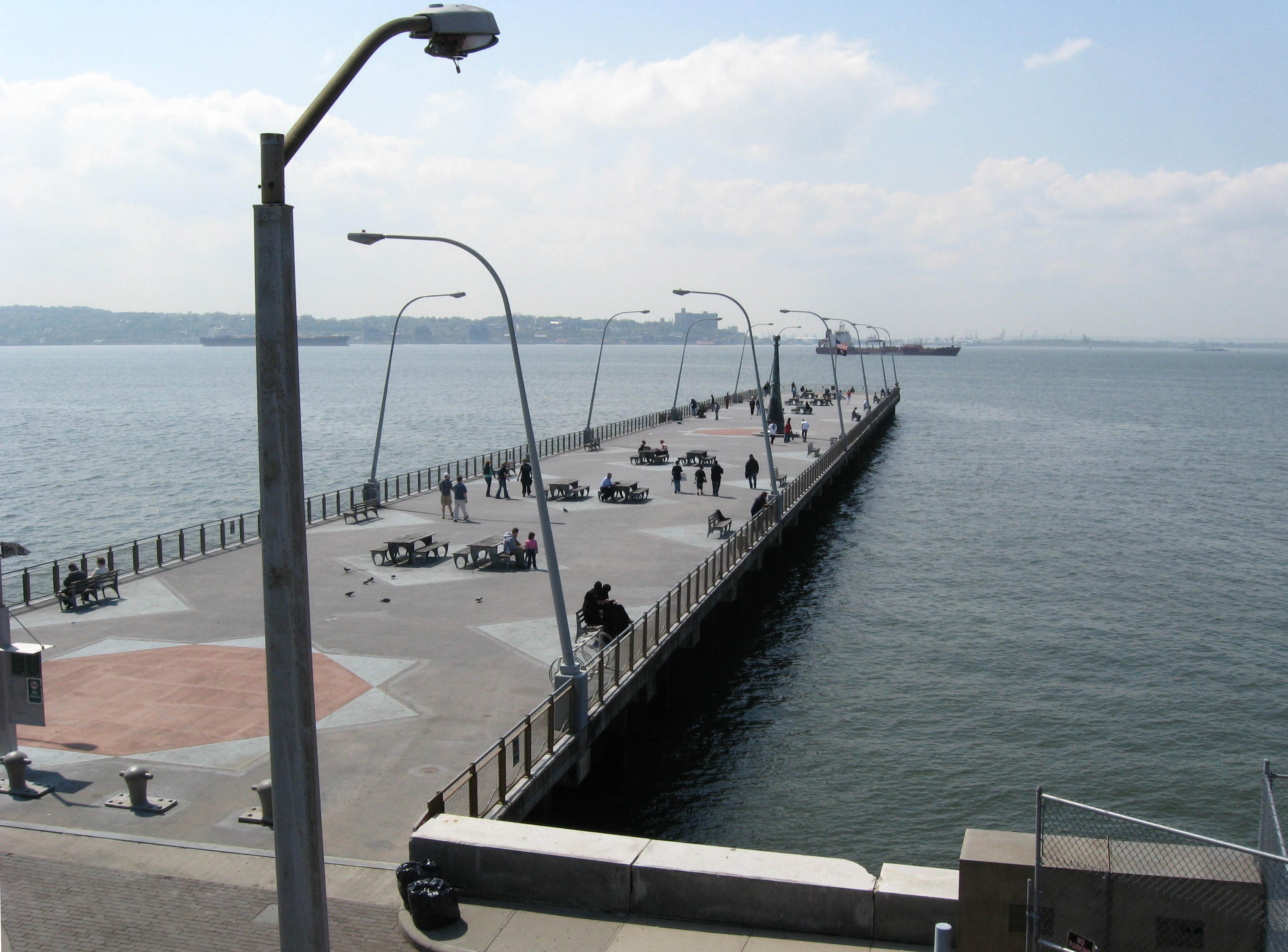
69th Street Pier in 2008

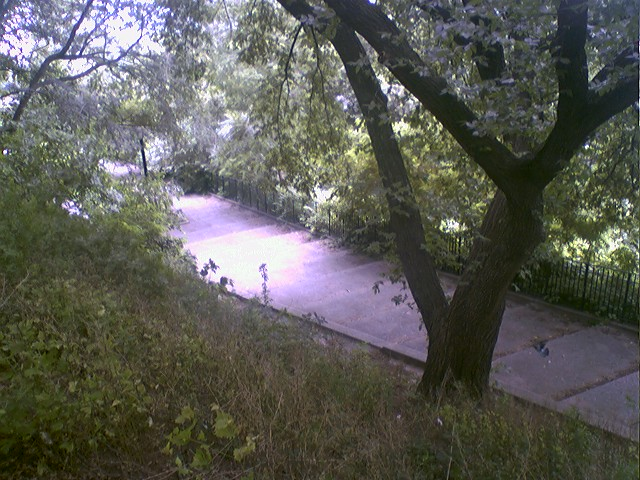
The park strip between the shore road and Narrows

- 8200 Narrows Avenue House, (commonly referred to as the "Gingerbread House"), designed by James Sarsfield Kennedy in 1917, is a city landmark.
- American Veterans Memorial Pier (commonly referred to as the 69th Street Pier) at Bay Ridge Avenue and Shore Road is the community's key seaside recreation spot. Sports fishermen travel to fish the waters of "The Bay Ridge Anchorage" and along the seawall promenade that runs south from the pier to the Verrazzano–Narrows Bridge and east along Gravesend Bay. The pier features a sculpture that emits a beam of light as a memorial to those who died in the September 11 terrorist attacks. Commuter ferry service operated between this pier and the St. George Ferry Terminal in Staten Island from 1912 until 1964, the year the Verrazzano Bridge opened. Ferry service to Wall Street and points along the western coast of Brooklyn began in 2017 from the pier as part of NYC Ferry's South Brooklyn route.
- Bennet-Farrell-Feldman House, located at 119 95th Street, was built in 1847 and is now an official city landmark. An accompanying structure, thought to have been used as a barn, couldn't be saved and was demolished. Legend has it the house was turned so that its "widow's walk", a balcony that traditionally faces the sea so women left at home could watch for their husbands' ships, would no longer face the Narrows.
- Doctors' Row, a series of houses along Bay Ridge Pkwy between Fourth and Fifth Avenues (see § Doctors' Row)
- Fort Hamilton, an active military base near the Verrazzano–Narrows Bridge (see § Fort Hamilton Army Base)
- The Houses at 216–264 Ovington Ave. were listed on the National Register of Historic Places in 2007.
- Owl's Head Park (also known as Bliss Park), in the neighborhood's northwest corner, was previously the private estate of the Bliss Family, for whom nearby Bliss Terrace is named. They sold what remained of the estate to the city in 1928 for $850,000, after Eliphalet Williams Bliss specified in his will 25 years earlier that he wanted the city to buy the land and convert it into parkland. Before them, a portion of the property was owned by Henry C. Murphy, a former Mayor of Brooklyn, ambassador, congressman and New York State Senator for whom the nearby Senator Street is named. Remnants of the estate—mansion, stable, observation tower—were still visible into the 1930s and 40s, when they were finally demolished, having been left to fall into disrepair. It is a 24-acre (97,000 m^{2}) walking park that has a state-of-the-art skate park, dog run, children's playground and basketball courts; it has the first concrete skatepark built in Brooklyn.
- The Senator Street Historic District was listed on the National Register of Historic Places in 2002.
- New York Road Runners hosts a weekly 3-mile (4.8 km) open run at Shore Road Park.
- Step streets are public staircases in the middle of a street. As a rule they were placed on hills that were too steep to build a road for cars but still allow access to pedestrians.
- St. John's Episcopal Church was where Robert E. Lee served as a vestryman and where his future "right hand", Thomas J. "Stonewall" Jackson, was baptized. The building no longer hosts services.

=== Fort Hamilton Army Base ===
Historic Fort Hamilton Army Base is located in the southwestern corner of the New York City borough of Brooklyn, with gates in Bay Ridge and Dyker Heights, and is one of several posts that are part of the region which is headquartered by the Military District of Washington. Its mission is to provide the New York metropolitan area with military installation support for the Army National Guard and the United States Army Reserve. The base is considered to be part of Bay Ridge. The children stationed at the base are zoned into Bay Ridge schools.

Fort Hamilton houses one of the neighborhood's few cultural attractions, the Harbor Defense Museum.

=== Doctors' Row ===
Doctors' Row is a series of rowhouses located on Bay Ridge Parkway between 4th and 5th Avenues, built in the 1900s and 1910s prior to the opening of the Fourth Avenue subway line. The 54 houses that comprise Doctors' Row include elements of the Renaissance Revival architectural style, with some elements in the Colonial Revival style. In 2019 the New York City Landmarks Preservation Commission made Doctors' Row an official city-designated historic district, making it the first such district in the neighborhood.

== Police and crime ==
The NYPD's 68th Precinct is located at 333 65th Street. The 68th Precinct ranked 7th safest out of 69 patrol areas for per-capita crime in 2010. As of 2018, with a non-fatal assault rate of 23 per 100,000 people, Bay Ridge and Dyker Heights' rate of violent crimes per capita is less than that of the city as a whole. The incarceration rate of 168 per 100,000 people is lower than that of the city as a whole.

The 68th Precinct has a lower crime rate than in the 1990s, with crimes across all categories having decreased by 88.6% between 1990 and 2018. The precinct reported 2 murders, 16 rapes, 59 robberies, 129 felony assaults, 96 burglaries, 387 grand larcenies, and 86 grand larcenies auto in 2018.

== Fire safety ==
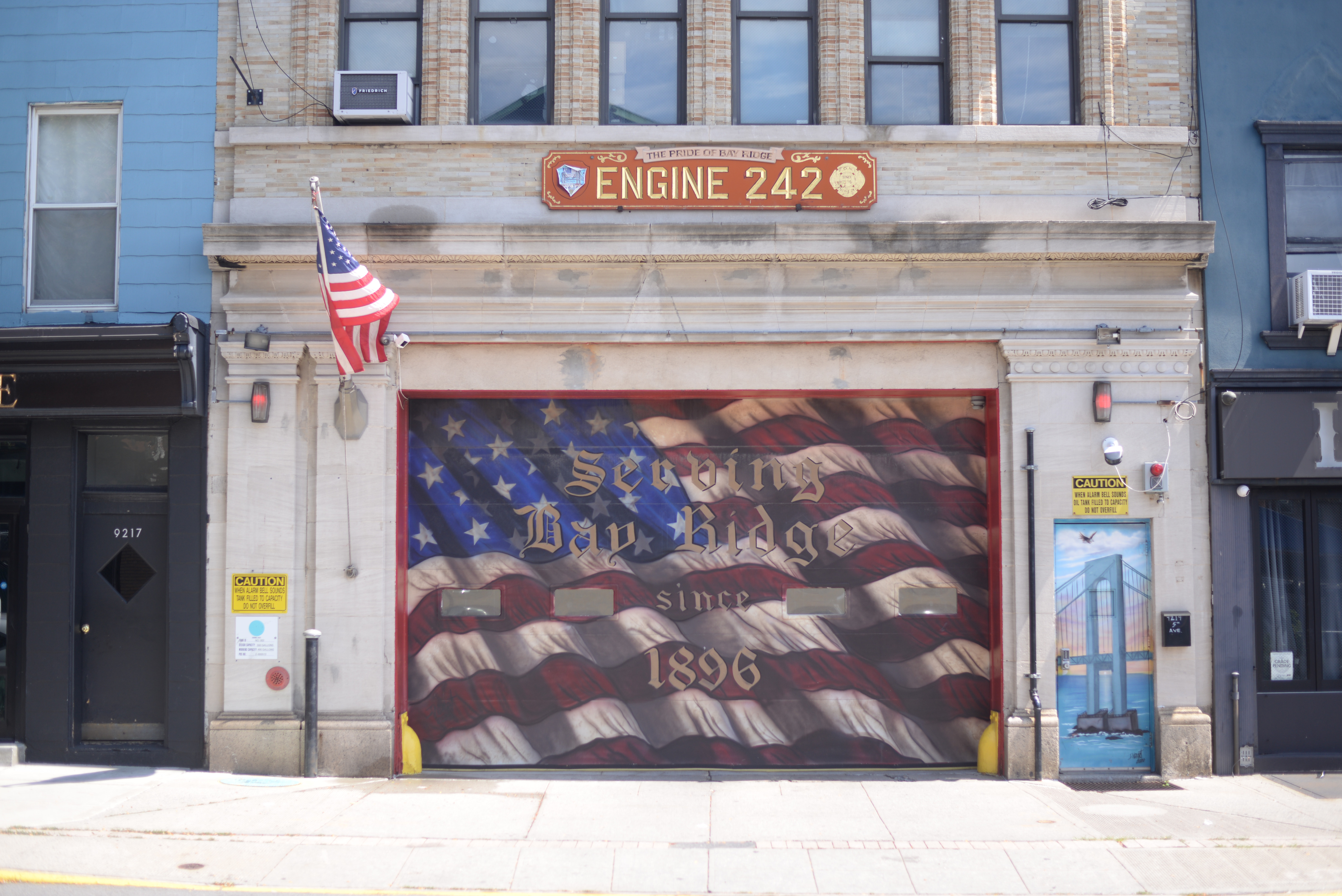
The fire station for Engine Co. 242

The New York City Fire Department (FDNY) contains two fire stations in Bay Ridge. Engine Co. 241/Ladder Co. 109 is located at 6630 3rd Avenue. Engine Co. 242, serving primarily Fort Hamilton, is located at 9219 5th Avenue.

== Health ==
As of 2018, preterm births and births to teenage mothers are less common in Bay Ridge and Dyker Heights than in other places citywide. In Bay Ridge and Dyker Heights, there were 71 preterm births per 1,000 live births (compared to 87 per 1,000 citywide), and 11.4 births to teenage mothers per 1,000 live births (compared to 19.3 per 1,000 citywide). Bay Ridge and Dyker Heights have a high population of residents who are uninsured, or who receive healthcare through Medicaid. In 2018, this population of uninsured residents was estimated to be 15%, which is higher than the citywide rate of 12%.

The concentration of fine particulate matter, the deadliest type of air pollutant, in Bay Ridge and Dyker Heights is 0.0074 milligrams per cubic metre (7.4×10^{−9} oz/ft^{3}), lower than the citywide and boroughwide averages. Twelve percent of Bay Ridge and Dyker Heights residents are smokers, which is lower than the city average of 14% of residents being smokers. In Bay Ridge and Dyker Heights, 28% of residents are obese, 15% are diabetic, and 31% have high blood pressure—compared to the citywide averages of 24%, 11%, and 28% respectively. In addition, 16% of children are obese, compared to the citywide average of 20%.

Ninety-two percent of residents eat some fruits and vegetables every day, which is slightly higher than the city's average of 87%. In 2018, 74% of residents described their health as "good", "very good", or "excellent", lower than the city's average of 78%. For every supermarket in Bay Ridge and Dyker Heights, there are 20 bodegas.

The Bay Ridge/Dyker Heights/Bensonhurst area does not have any hospitals after the Victory Memorial Hospital was closed and converted to a nursing home by Joel Landau in 2010 (now known as the Hamilton Park Nursing and Rehabilitation Center). In 2023, Maimonides Health opened a Bay Ridge Emergency Department in the same area, next door. However, the Coney Island Hospital, NYU Langone Hospital – Brooklyn, and Maimonides Medical Center are located in nearby neighborhoods. Additionally, the BRAVO Volunteer Ambulance is run by the Bay Ridge Ambulance Volunteer Organization.

== Post offices and ZIP Codes ==
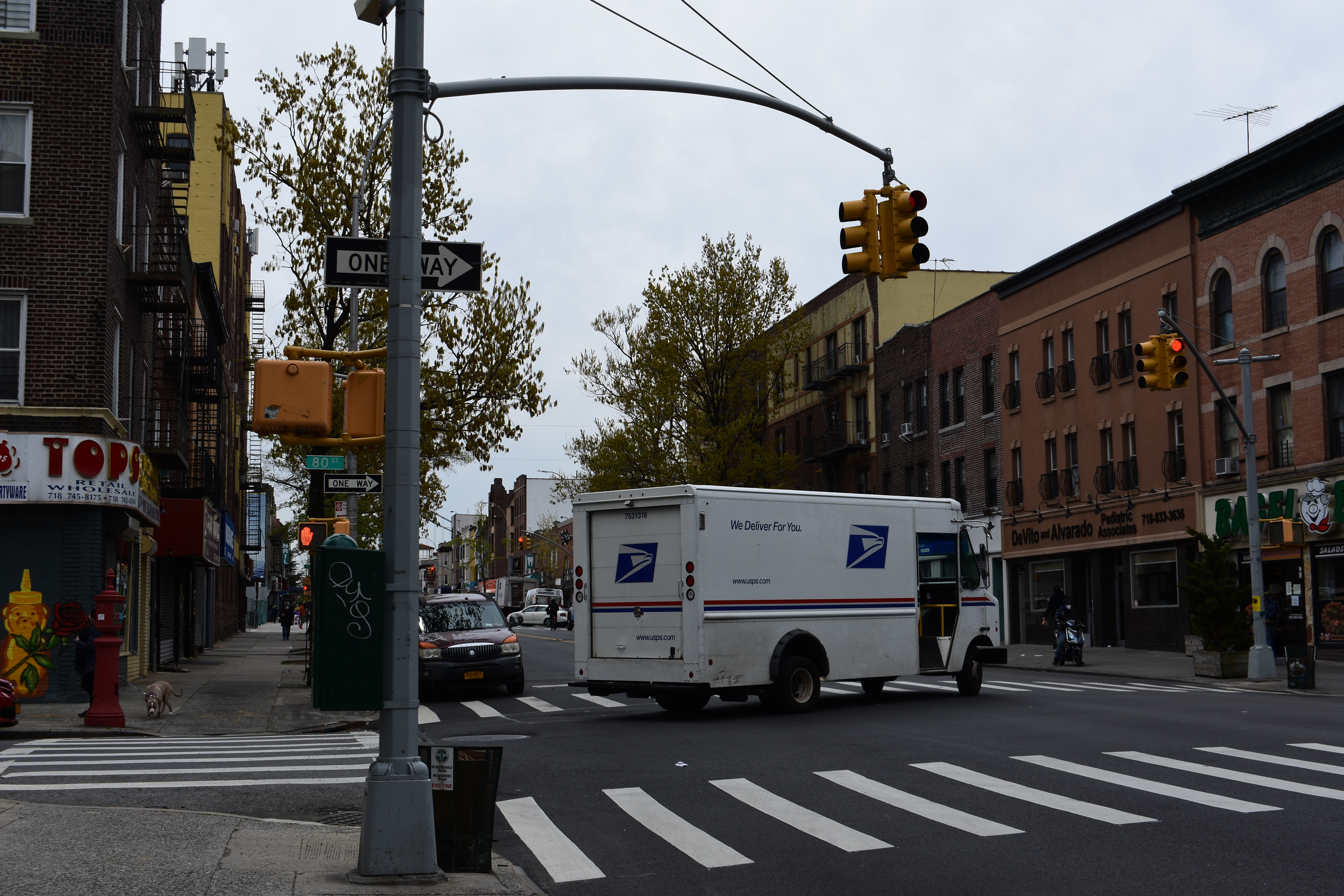
United States Postal Service Truck in Bay Ridge, April 2020

Bay Ridge is covered mostly by ZIP Code 11209, though the small portion north of 65th Street is covered by ZIP Code 11220. The United States Post Office operates the Ovington Station at 6803 4th Avenue and the Fort Hamilton Station at 8801 5th Avenue.

== Politics ==
For many years, Bay Ridge has been a relatively conservative enclave of Brooklyn. Mike Long, who served as chairman of the Conservative Party of New York from 1988 to 2019, owned a liquor store and resided in the district. The community is also considered a Republican stronghold. An exception was Democrat Sal Albanese, who was elected to the neighborhood's City Council seat in 1983, defeating the 21-year incumbent Republican-Conservative Minority Leader Angelo G. Arculeo, and went on to represent the district for 15 years. After the 1990 census, the area was split into two Assembly districts to eliminate a Republican Assembly Seat. The political landscape began to change with population shifts over the 1990s and early 2000s, when the multigenerational white ethnic population began to die or move from the area.

The community supported the Democratic Party during many presidential elections. In the 2010s, the neighborhood increasingly supported Democrats, such as City Councilmembers Justin Brannan (elected in 2017) and Kayla Santosuosso (elected in 2025) and state senator Andrew Gounardes (elected in 2018, defeating longtime Republican Marty Golden).

The neighborhood is part of New York's 11th congressional district, represented by Republican Nicole Malliotakis as of 2021. It is also part of the 26th State Senate district, represented by Gounardes, and the 46th, 51st and 64th State Assembly districts, represented respectively by Republican Alec Brook-Krasny, Democrat Marcela Mitaynes and Republican Michael Tannousis.

== Education ==
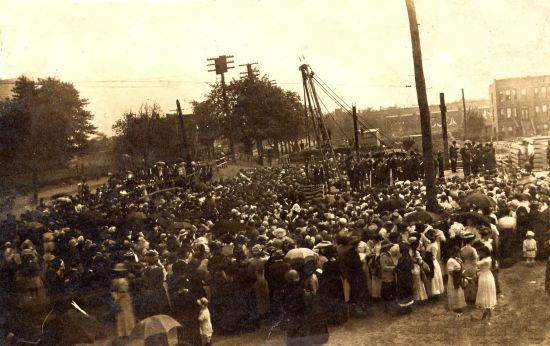
Breaking ground on Bay Ridge High School, 1914

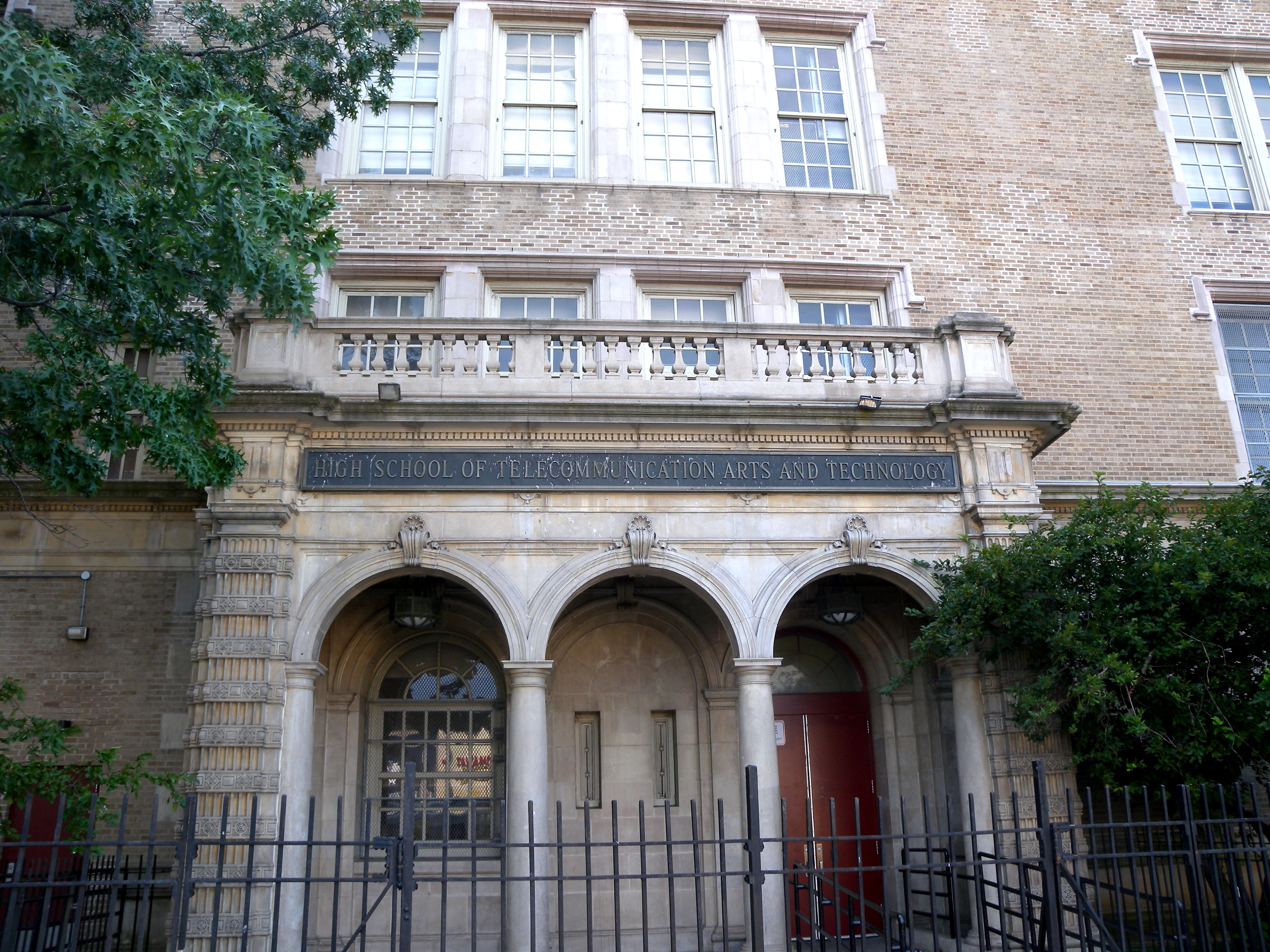
High School of Telecommunications

Bay Ridge and Dyker Heights have a ratio of college-educated residents similar to the rest of the city's as of 2018. Forty-six percent of Bay Ridge and Dyker Heights residents age 25 and older have a college education or higher, 19% have less than a high school education, and 35% are high school graduates or have some college education. By contrast, 40% of Brooklynites and 38% of city residents have a college education or higher. The percentage of Bay Ridge and Dyker Heights students excelling in reading and math has been increasing, with reading achievement rising from 51 percent in 2000 to 52 percent in 2011, and math achievement rising from 49 percent to 71 percent within the same time period.

Bay Ridge and Dyker Heights' rate of elementary school student absenteeism is lower than the rest of New York City's. In Bay Ridge and Dyker Heights, 8% of elementary school students missed twenty or more days per school year, compared to the citywide average of 20% of students. Additionally, 82% of high school students in Bay Ridge and Dyker Heights graduate on time, higher than the citywide average of 75% of students.

=== Primary and secondary schools ===
The New York City Department of Education operates area public schools. Educational institutions in Bay Ridge include PS 102, PS 170, PS 127, PS 185 (Walter Kassenbrock Elementary School), PS 104 (called the Fort Hamilton School), PS 264 (Bay Ridge Elementary School for the Arts), Lutheran Elementary School, Bay Ridge Catholic Academy (formerly St. Anselm's Roman Catholic School), PS/IS 30 (also known as Mary White Ovington), PS 413 Joanne Seminara School of Law and Medicine, IS 259 (also known as William McKinley Junior High School), Fort Hamilton High School, and High School of Telecommunications (originally all-girls Bay Ridge High School).

There are also parochial or private schools in Bay Ridge. These include Angels Catholic Academy, Bay Ridge Preparatory School, Poly Prep Country Day School, Visitation Academy, Adelphi Academy, Fontbonne Hall Academy, St. Patrick Elementary School, D., G. Kaloidis Parochial School, and Xaverian High School. Fort Hamilton High School, between 83rd and 85th streets, was erected in the 1940s on the grounds of the Crescent Athletic Club, a country club.

=== Libraries ===
Brooklyn Public Library (BPL) operates two public libraries in the neighborhood. The Bay Ridge Library, located at 7223 Ridge Boulevard at 73rd Street, is the larger of the two. The Bay Ridge Reading Club first organized the library in 1880. It opened on its present site in 1896 and became a BPL branch in 1901. The current two-story facility opened in 1960. In 2004 it received a $2.1 million renovation, including new furniture and shelving, new lighting equipment, a new roof, and 27 additional public access computers.

The Fort Hamilton Library, located at 9424 Fourth Avenue between 94th and 95th Streets, was built as a Carnegie library in 1906. The current branch's predecessor became a part of the BPL system in 1901 and moved to its current location in 1905. Since then it has gone through numerous renovations. The most recent renovation was completed in March 2011.

== Transportation ==
The area is served by the R train on the BMT Fourth Avenue Line of the New York City Subway between Bay Ridge Avenue and 95th Street.

Additionally, there are MTA express bus routes X27, X37 which mainly serve for the commute to Manhattan, but also run during off-peak hours on weekdays. The X27 also runs on weekends. The routes X28, X38 also serve the eastern part of Bay Ridge. Many Bay Ridge commuters opt for the relative comfort and convenience of the express bus, even though it costs more than the subway. Bay Ridge is readily accessible by car, encircled by the Belt Parkway and Gowanus Expressway. Local bus routes include B1, B4, B8, B9, B16, B37, B63, B64, B70, S53, S79 SBS, S93.

The freight-only Bay Ridge Branch connects car floats to the Long Island Rail Road. The Interborough Express, under planning as of late 2025, would be a light metro line running along the right-of-way of the Bay Ridge Branch, with the line terminating at Brooklyn Army Terminal to the west and continuing to Queens in the east.

In June 2017, Bay Ridge became the terminus of NYC Ferry's South Brooklyn route. NYC Ferry's St. George route took over service to Bay Ridge in 2025.

== Notable people ==
- Sal Albanese (born 1949), politician who served as a member of the New York City Council
- Maria Bartiromo (born 1967), Fox News anchor, grew up in Bay Ridge, where her family owned an Italian restaurant
- Bob Berg (1951–2002), jazz saxophonist
- Alexis Bittar (born 1968), jewelry designer and CEO
- Richard Bright (1937–2006), actor
- Jason Calacanis (born 1970), technology entrepreneur and founder of Silicon Alley Reporter
- Ron Chernow (born 1949), biographer
- Chuck Connors (1921–1992), actor of The Rifleman fame, grew up on Senator Street between 3rd and 4th Avenues, and attended Adelphi Academy
- Bill Corbett (born 1960), writer and actor known for his work on the later seasons of Mystery Science Theater 3000
- C. C. DeVille (born 1962 as Bruce Anthony Johannesson), guitarist of the 1980s glam band Poison grew up in Bay Ridge, attending P.S. 102, McKinley JHS, and Fort Hamilton H.S.\
- Calvert DeForest (1921–2007), actor and comedian (known for his character Larry "Bud" Melman)
- Chris Distefano (born 1984), comedian from Guy Code, Girl Code, Bay Ridge Boys and History Hyenas
- Jimmy Fallon (born 1974), television host, comedian, actor, singer, musician, and producer
- Joel Gertner (born 1975), professional wrestling TV personality, a graduate of Poly Prep, and current resident of Bay Ridge
- Robert Ginty (1948–2009) actor who played Lt. T.J. Wiley in TV series Baa Baa Black Sheep
- John Gray, creator and writer of the Ghost Whisperer TV series
- Emmett Grogan (1942–1978), novelist and counterculture icon
- James Hayden (1953–1983), actor best known for his role in Once Upon a Time in America
- Stonewall Jackson (1824–1863), Confederate General, once stationed at Fort Hamilton
- Willard F. Jones (1890–1967), naval architect, head of National Safety Council's marine section and Vice President of Gulf Oil
- Jackie Kelk (1923–2002), actor
- Walter Kelleher (?-1970), photographer
- June Kirby (1928–2022), actress and model
- Lordz of Brooklyn members Adam "ADM" McLeer and Michael "Mr. Kaves" McLeer – born in and still resides in Bay Ridge
- Robert E. Lee (1807–1870), Confederate General, once stationed at Fort Hamilton
- Nadine Macaluso (born 1967), psychologist and former model
- Kevin Matthews (born 1983), professional wrestler better known under the ring name "KM" for Impact Wrestling
- Allyn Ann McLerie (1926–2018), actress known for They Shoot Horses, Don't They?, Punky Brewster and more.
- Giulia Melucci (born 1966), author of I Loved, I Lost, I Made Spaghetti, grew up in Bay Ridge and attended Visitation Academy
- Daniel J. Murphy (1922–2001), US Navy Admiral, chief of staff to George H. W. Bush during his first term as vice president
- Yannis Pappas, comedian who has appeared in Bay Ridge Boys and History Hyenas
- Larry Ray (born 1959), criminal convicted of sex trafficking, extortion, forced labor, and other offenses, sentenced to 60 years in prison
- Pee Wee Reese (1918–1999), shortstop for the Brooklyn Dodgers who lived in a brick duplex at 9712 Barwell Terrace, off 97th Street.
- Jerry Rosenberg (born c. 1934), owner of JGE Appliance Stores, and pitchman of various local businesses in the New York Tri-State area throughout the 1970s
- Lillian Russell (1860–1922), operetta singer and vaudeville actress
- Hubert Selby Jr. (1928–2004), novelist (Last Exit to Brooklyn, Requiem for a Dream)
- Frank Seminara (born 1967), former professional baseball player
- Brandon Silvestry (born 1979), professional wrestler better known by his ring name, Low Ki.
- Duke Snider (1926–2011), Brooklyn Dodger, rented 178 Marine Avenue during the baseball season
- Gilbert Sorrentino (1929–2006), novelist, poet, and editor
- Janet Yellen (born 1946), former United States Secretary of the Treasury and former Chair of the Federal Reserve, attended Fort Hamilton High School and lived on Ridge Boulevard
- Henny Youngman (1906–1998), comedian

== In popular culture ==
=== Books ===
- Between Two Moons, Aisha Abdel Gawad's debut novel, is set in the Arab immigrant community of Bay Ridge, Brooklyn, during the month of Ramadan.
- Two of Lawrence Block's Matthew Scudder novels, When the Sacred Ginmill Closes and A Walk Among the Tombstones, are partially set in Bay Ridge.
- Kenneth H. Brown's The Narrows (1970) is set in Bay Ridge during the 1950s.
- The Fort Hamilton army base is the setting for most of Nelson DeMille's novel Word of Honor (1985).
- Tom McDonough's novel Virgin with Child is set in Bay Ridge.
- Several short stories by Hubert Selby, Jr. are set in the neighborhood, including "Liebesnacht" and "Double Feature". Some of his novels are also set in the neighborhood or nearby, like Last Exit to Brooklyn and The Demon.
- Several novels by Gilbert Sorrentino are set in the neighborhood, including Steelwork, Red the Fiend, Crystal Vision, A Strange Commonplace, Little Casino, and The Abyss of Human Illusion.

=== Films ===
- The movie Saturday Night Fever (1977) was set in Bay Ridge as well as Sunset Park and Bensonhurst
- The film White Irish Drinkers (2010), directed by John Gray, is set in Bay Ridge

=== Television shows ===
- NYPD Commissioner Frank Reagan (Tom Selleck) on CBS-TV's Blue Bloods lives in Bay Ridge; his home at 8070 Harbor View Terrace, near Fort Hamilton High School, is seen in each episode
- The 2012 reality series Brooklyn 11223 was set in Bay Ridge
- Peggy Olson, the Norwegian-American copywriter on AMC's Mad Men, is from Bay Ridge. In the second episode of Season One, she declared, "I'm from Bay Ridge. We have manners."
