= A Walk Among the Tombstones =

A Walk Among the Tombstones may refer to:

- A Walk Among the Tombstones (novel), a 1992 novel by Lawrence Block
  - A Walk Among the Tombstones (film), a 2014 film based on the novel, starring Liam Neeson
