= The Music Room (short story) =

Short story by Stephen King

- Short story by Stephen King
- Country: United States
- Language: English
- Genre: Horror short story

Publication
- Published in: Playboy (December 2016); In Sunlight or in Shadow Pegasus Books (Illustrated) (December 2016); You Like It Darker (paperback edition)
- Publisher: Playboy Enterprises
- Media type: Print, digital, audiobook
- Publication date: 2016 (1st release)

Chronology
| Cookie Jar | Gwendy's Button Box |

"The Music Room" is a short story by Stephen King, first published in the December 2016 issue of Playboy magazine. It was inspired by the 1932 Edward Hopper painting Room in New York.

== Plot summary ==
Mr. and Mrs. Enderby are a childless couple living in a brownstone apartment on Third Avenue in New York City in the late-1930s. As the story begins, they are seated in the titular music room of their apartment. Mr. Enderby is reading the New York Journal-American; he notes that there is no mention of "our pal" George Timmons, then goes on to read aloud to Mrs. Enderby from the funny pages.

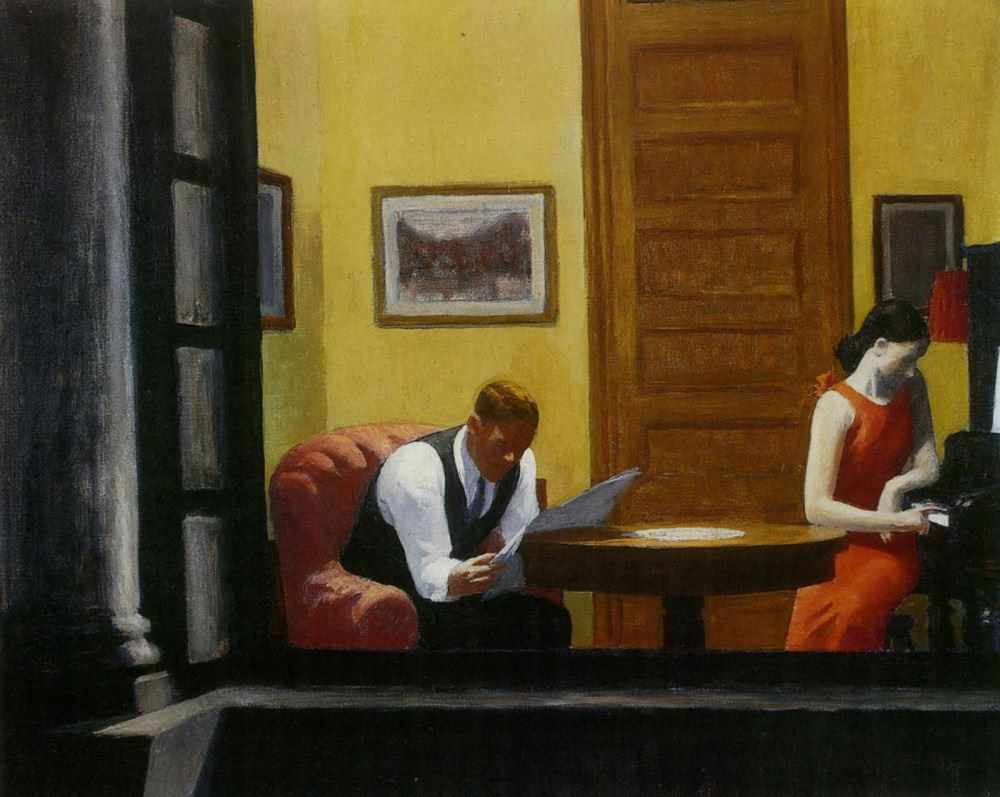
The 1932 Edward Hopper painting Room in New York inspired "The Music Room"; the unnamed couple in the painting are reimagined as the villainous Enderbys.

As the couple talk, there are various noises from the music room's closet. It is revealed that the aforementioned George Timmons is locked in the closet, which has been reinforced for this purpose; he is the sixth person the Enderbys have imprisoned there. Mr. Timmons is a businessman from Albany, New York whom Mr. Enderby met in McSorley's Old Ale House and invited home for dinner, whereupon the couple drugged him by putting chloral hydrate in his wine and imprisoned him in the closet. The couple have stolen Mr. Timmons' wallet and watch and forced him to sign checks made out to cash, representing around $1,000. They are now waiting for him to die from thirst and starvation, upon which they will use the van of Enderby Enterprises – their company, which folded two years prior due to the Great Depression – to deposit his body in the New Jersey Pine Barrens.

Mrs. Enderby is discomforted by the noises from the closet and wishes Mr. Timmons would stop. She is shocked when Mr. Enderby offers to kill Mr. Timmons, claiming that the couple are thieves but not murderers. After Mr. Enderby disagrees, Mrs. Enderby states that if she was put on trial, she would tell the judge and jury that the couple were "victims of circumstance". Mr. Enderby notes that after Mr. Timmons is dead, the couple will not have to "go back to work" for some time. At his prompting, Mrs. Enderby admits that she enjoys capturing their victims and searching their wallets, but does not enjoy waiting for them to die.

The story ends with Mr. Enderby encouraging Mrs. Enderby to play her piano. After Mrs. Enderby has played several songs, the noises from the closet have ended. Mr. Enderby jokes that music "hath powers to soothe the savage beast" and the couple "laugh together, comfortably, the way people do when they have been married for many years and have come to know each other's minds".

== Publication ==
"The Music Room" was initially published in Playboy magazine in November 2016. It was included in the 2016 anthology In Sunlight or in Shadow: Stories Inspired by the Paintings of Edward Hopper edited by Lawrence Block. An audio recording of the story was included with the audiobook of Gwendy's Button Box. In July 2024, King noted that "The Music Room" had been omitted from his 2024 short story collection You Like It Darker due to him forgetting about it, but that it would "probably" be included in the paperback edition. In 2025, "The Music Room" was included in the paperback edition of You Like It Darker.

== Reception ==
Writing for Screen Rant, Alisha Grauso described "The Music Room" as "a quick but effective story utilizing Stephen King's greatest strength, albeit in a different setting: the monstrous hiding just underneath a seemingly idyllic, normal setting." Reviewing In Sunlight or In Shadow: Stories Inspired by the Paintings of Edward Hopper for The New York Review of Books, Michael J. McCann stated "...the anthology would not have been complete without Stephen King's 'The Music Room,' inspired by the Hopper painting Room in New York (1932). Master of the thousand-page bestseller, King proved he can also produce short fiction with a story that moves from an innocuous interior scene featuring a man and woman passing time in a room to a chilling, horrifying revelation of cold-blooded cruelty that only King could pull off." Reviewing the collection for the Chicago Review of Books, Amy Brady described "The Music Room" as being "only tangentially related" to the painting that inspired it, noting King's "delightfully twisted perspective". Reviewing the collection for The Woven Tale Press, DeWitt Henry cited "The Music Room" as an example of a "[mystery] of situation rather than of heart" with "the lure of O. Henry snapper plots, or of Roald Dahl or Rod Serling, combined with gleeful cynicism". Publishers Weekly described "The Music Room" as "disturbingly ghoulish". Mike Finn described the story as "short, stylised and delightfully dark and twisted".

== See also ==
- Stephen King short fiction bibliography
