= Last Call =

Last call is an announcement made in a bar before serving drinks is stopped.

Last Call may also refer to:

== Film and television ==
=== Film ===
- Last Call (1958 film), an Australian television play
- Last Call (1991 film), a thriller film
- Last Call (1999 film), a Chilean-American thriller featuring Peter Coyote and Elizabeth Berkley
- Last Call (2002 film), a film about F. Scott Fitzgerald
- Last Call, a 2004 film featuring Lynn Cohen
- Last Call, a 2005 short film written by Laura Censabella
- Last Call, a 2006 film featuring Natalie Denise Sperl
- Last Call, a 2008 film starring Lori Petty
- Last Call (2012 film), a film starring Diora Baird
- The Last Call (2013 film), a Mexican comedy-drama film directed by Francisco Franco
- Last Call (2017 film), or Dominion, a film about Dylan Thomas
- Last Call (2019 film), a film by Gavin Michael Booth
- Last Call (2020 film), a Bulgarian film starring Maria Bakalova
- Last Call (2021 film), a film starring Jeremy Piven

=== Television ===
==== Shows ====
- Last Call (talk show), a 1994–1995 American late-night show hosted by Tad Low
- Last Call: When a Serial Killer Stalked Queer New York, a 2023 documentary miniseries based on a book by Elon Green
- Last Call with Carson Daly, a 2002–2019 American late-night talk show
- Last Call, a Canadian late-night show that aired on Toronto One
- Last Call, a series that aired on Bounce TV

==== Episodes ====
- "Last Call" (Ash vs Evil Dead), 2016
- "Last Call" (The L Word: Generation Q), 2021
- "Last Call" (Person of Interest), 2014
- "The Last Call" (The Good Wife), 2014

== Literature ==
- Last Call (novel), a 1992 novel by Tim Powers
- Last Call, a 2008 novel by James Grippando
- Last Call, a 2004 short-story collection by K. L. Cook
- Last Call: Memoirs of an NFL Referee, a 1999 book by Jerry Markbreit
- Last Call: The Rise and Fall of Prohibition, a 2010 book by Daniel Okrent
- "Last Call", a 2009 short-story set in the Dresden Files book series by Jim Butcher

== Music ==
=== Albums ===
- Last Call (Rittz album), 2017
- Last Call, by Betty Blowtorch, 2003
- Last Call, by Cayouche, 2003
- Last Call, by Alleycat Scratch, 2009
- Last Call, by Jeff Healey, 2010

=== Songs ===
- "Last Call" (Dave Van Ronk song)
- "Last Call" (Lee Ann Womack song), 2008
- "Last Call", by the Alkaholiks from 21 & Over
- "Last Call", by Dierks Bentley from Feel That Fire
- "Last Call", by Elliott Smith from Roman Candle
- "Last Call", by Junior Walker & The All-Stars from Road Runner
- "Last Call", by Kanye West from The College Dropout
- "Last Call", by Katy Hudson (later known as Katy Perry) from Katy Hudson
- "Last Call", by Logic from YSIV
- "Last Call", by OutKast from Speakerboxxx/The Love Below
- "Last Call", by Patti Smith from Peace and Noise
- "Last Call", by Pink from Trustfall
- "Last Call", by the Plain White T's from All That We Needed
- "Last Call", by the Reklaws from Freshman Year
- "Last Call", by The Saturdays from On Your Radar
- "Last Call", by Traci Braxton from Crash & Burn

== Other uses ==
- Last Call (store), a chain of clearance centers operated by Neiman Marcus
- Last Call (video game), a 2000 computer game
- Operation Last Call, a law enforcement initiative in the U.S. state of Texas
- Last Call, a program on Hardcore Sports Radio
- "Last Call", a nickname for mixed martial artist Danny Castillo

== See also ==
- Final Call (disambiguation)
