= Last Call (Dave Van Ronk song) =

Last Call is a song by Dave Van Ronk, originally released on his album Songs For Ageing Children in 1973, and released in a different version on Going Back To Brooklyn in 1994, and is one of the few songs he has written.

Van Ronk claims that he woke up one morning after a night of drinking with Leonard Cohen and Joni Mitchell, and the lyrics to this song were written on a piece of paper. Neither of them admitted to writing it, so he had to assume that he had.

== In popular culture ==
Crime writer Lawrence Block took the title of his Matthew Scudder novel When the Sacred Ginmill Closes (1986) from the lyrics to the song:

And so we’ve had another night
of poetry and poses,
and each man knows he’ll be alone
when the sacred ginmill closes.

A key scene in the novel has ex-cop Scudder listening to the song late one night in the studio apartment of a bartender as they drink their lives away, and the song serves as a structural and philosophical theme for the book.
