= 8 Million Ways to Die =

1986 film by Hal Ashby

- Theatrical release poster
- Directed by: Hal Ashby
- Written by: Oliver Stone; R. Lance Hill; Robert Towne (uncredited)
- Based on: 8 Million Ways To Die by Lawrence Block
- Produced by: Stephen J. Roth; Mark Damon; Charles Mulvehill; John W. Hyde
- Starring: Jeff Bridges; Rosanna Arquette; Alexandra Paul; Andy Garcia
- Cinematography: Stephen H. Burum
- Edited by: Robert Lawrence; Stuart H. Pappé
- Music by: James Newton Howard
- Production company: Producers Sales Organization
- Distributed by: PSO International; Tri-Star Pictures
- Release date: April 25, 1986
- Running time: 115 minutes
- Country: United States
- Language: English
- Budget: $18 million
- Box office: $1,305,114

8 Million Ways to Die is a 1986 American neo-noir crime thriller film directed by Hal Ashby and starring Jeff Bridges, Rosanna Arquette, and Andy Garcia. It was Ashby's final film, and the first attempt to adapt the Matthew Scudder detective stories of Lawrence Block for the screen. The screenplay was written by Oliver Stone, an uncredited Robert Towne and David Lee Henry (R. Lance Hill using a pseudonym).

== Plot ==
An alcoholic Los Angeles Sheriff's Deputy, Matt Scudder, takes part in a drug bust that results in his fatal shooting of a small-time dealer in front of the man's wife and kids. Scudder ends up in a drunk ward, suffering from booze and blackouts, ending his career, and his marriage, and jeopardizing his relationship with his daughter.

After an Alcoholics Anonymous meeting, a woman hands Scudder a note, which invites him to a private gambling club on a hill, accessible only by a funicular, owned by Chance Walker. At the club, Scudder is greeted by a call girl named Sunny, who pretends that he is her boyfriend. He also meets Angel Maldonado, who places large wagers with Chance and is infatuated with another call girl there, Sarah.

Bewildered by Sunny's behavior, Scudder ends up back at his place, where after a failed attempt to seduce him, Sunny explains that she is frightened and needs help. After she pays him $5,000, Scudder offers Chance $2,500 to allow Sunny to quit prostitution. An insulted Chance insists that all he does is run the club, paying the girls a flat salary to attend his parties. Any prostitution they do is up to them.

Sunny is kidnapped in front of Scudder and, during a chase, is murdered and thrown off a bridge. Scudder goes on a binge and wakes up in a drunk ward several days later. It transpires that he gave statements to detectives before getting drunk that have implicated himself and Chance in the murder. At the club, Maldonado wears a ring with an emerald that matched the missing jewel in a necklace that Sunny owned. Convinced now that Maldonado is her killer, Scudder persuades Sarah to leave the club with him, as a jealous Maldonado looks on. Sarah fails to get Scudder to drink with her, then tries to initiate sex but is too drunk and vomits on his bed.

Scudder pieces together that Maldonado is running a drug ring through Chance's legitimate businesses. Setting up a meeting where he pretends to set up a drug buy, Scudder has a confrontation with Maldonado, who forces Sarah to leave with him. Chance is furious that Maldonado has been using him and that he killed Sunny, but Scudder convinces him to go along with the drug deal, in order to trap Maldonado.

At Maldonado's house, a unique one designed by Antoni Gaudí, a suspicious Maldonado puts off any talk of drugs. He taunts Scudder about Sunny's death and carefully implies she was killed to scare off others who would cross him. Maldonado knows that Scudder is or was a cop, so is wary of being trapped in a sting. Scudder notices a package from a supermarket Chance owns. Deducing that the drugs were stashed there, Scudder and Chance go to the grocery store and find the hidden cocaine. Scudder offers to return them in exchange for Sarah.

At an empty warehouse, Maldonado arrives with Sarah duct-taped to a shotgun that one of his underlings is holding. Scudder in turn has booby-trapped the drugs and threatens to destroy them if Sarah is harmed. After seeing some of his cocaine burned, Maldonado agrees to cut Sarah loose, but before he can secure his drugs, a shootout erupts between Maldonado's men and undercover drug agents who have accompanied Scudder to the scene. Maldonado manages to escape in the chaos, but Chance is killed.

Sarah and Scudder head back to Chance's club, and as they ride the funicular up to the house, they see Maldonado standing at the top, waiting for them. Scudder manages to kill him in a tense gunfight. Scudder is later seen attending an AA meeting, then strolling happily with Sarah on a beach.

== Cast ==
- Jeff Bridges as Los Angeles Sheriff Deputy Matt Scudder
- Rosanna Arquette as Sarah
- Alexandra Paul as Sunny
- Randy Brooks as Willie "Chance" Walker
- Andy García as Angel Maldonado
- Tommy Lister as Nose Guard
- Lisa Sloan as Linda Scudder
- Christa Denton as Laurie Scudder
- Vance Valencia as Quintero
- Wilfredo Hernández as Hector Lopez (as Wilfredo Hernandez)
- Luisa Leschin as Hector's Wife
- Vyto Ruginis as Durkin
- Henry O. Arnold as Homicide Detective (as Chip Arnold)
- James Avery as Deputy District Attorney

== Production ==
Oliver Stone began writing a film adaptation of Lawrence Block's novel Eight Million Ways to Die, the fifth of Block's Matthew Scudder series of novels, after its release in 1982. It was originally intended to be directed by Walter Hill and star Nick Nolte. The film went into turnaround before being revived by Stephen J. Roth and the Producers Sales Organization in 1985. They cast Jeff Bridges and Jamie Lee Curtis in the primary roles. After Curtis left the film, the producers considered casting Cher before settling on Rosanna Arquette. By this time, Stone was committed to directing Salvador (1986) and was unavailable for rewrites, and so Robert Towne was hired to revise his script. PSO also moved the film's setting from New York City to Los Angeles in order to cut costs.

Production began in July 1985 in El Segundo, California, but Towne had not finished his script revisions yet. As a result, Bridges, Arquette, and the film's director Hal Ashby were forced to improvise many of the film's scenes until Towne finished his writing in August 1985. After the film was completed, the PSO fired both Ashby and his editor Robert Lawrence, and hired Stuart H. Pappe as the new editor to oversee the film's post-production without Ashby and Lawrence's participation. Pappe's edits drastically changed the film, deleting important scenes with Arquette and dubbing new dialogue with Bridges. Pappe also ordered James Newton Howard to recompose his score for the film to more closely resemble the theme for the popular television series Miami Vice. Ashby appealed to the Directors Guild of America for arbitration but was rejected.

== Reception ==
8 Million Ways to Die received negative reviews from critics. On the review aggregator website Rotten Tomatoes, 0% of 8 critics' reviews are positive, with an average rating of 3.3/10. Metacritic, which uses a weighted average, assigned the film a score of 29 out of 100, based on 10 critics, indicating "generally unfavorable" reviews. Audiences polled by CinemaScore gave the film an average grade of "C" on an A+ to F scale.

Gene Siskel and Roger Ebert gave the film "two thumbs down" on their syndicated movie reviews program. Both agreed the film squandered the talents of Bridges and Arquette, and was essentially a pale imitation of the 1983 version of Scarface. Siskel thought the film glamourized drug traffickers and the climactic shootout was the only good part of the movie, while Ebert believed the 12-step elements for Bridges' character were poorly-integrated into the larger plot and served no purpose.

Darren Hughes wrote in his 2004 Senses of Cinema article about director Hal Ashby, that 8 Million Ways to Die marked "something of a return to form" for Ashby. He describes it as "an entertaining piece of film noir", though "burdened by the stylistic influence of TV’s Miami Vice and by James Newton Howard’s cloying, synthesized score". Hughes writes that the movie "comes to life at surprising moments, particularly in the final act."

In an interview with Empire in 2014, Block said: "It was a terrible movie. From everything I've heard, it was not a happy set, [but] it's also been evident one did not have to have written the book to dislike the movie.

Although famed director Quentin Tarantino has publicly criticized 1980s cinema as being too soft and risk-averse, he listed 8 Million Ways To Die as one of his favorite films of the decade.
