= Houses at 216–264 Ovington Avenue =

Historic district in Brooklyn, New York

- Houses at 216–264 Ovington Ave.
- U.S. National Register of Historic Places
- U.S. Historic district
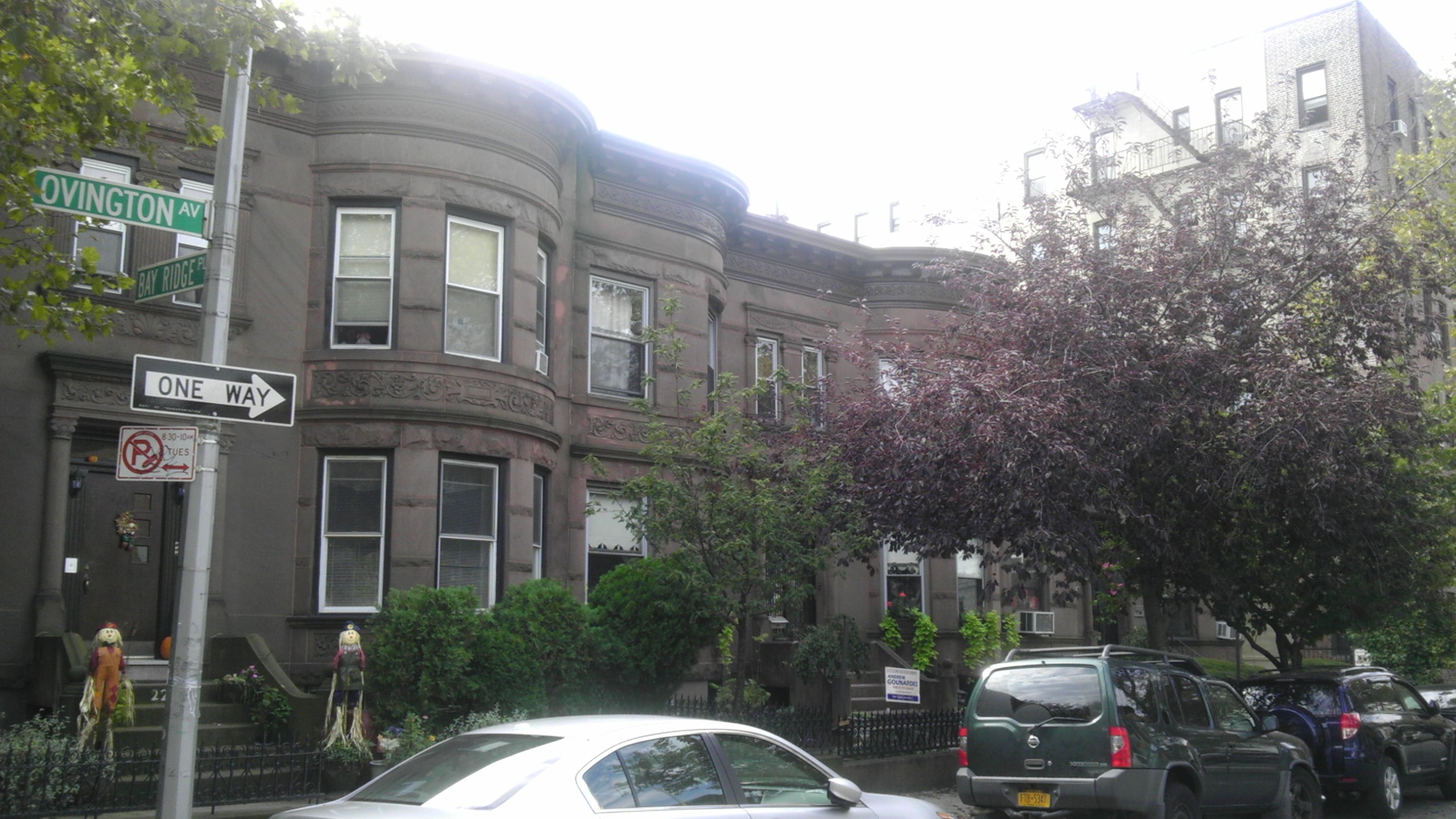

- Location within New York City Location within New York Location within the United States
- Location: 216–264 Ovington Ave., Brooklyn, New York
- Coordinates: 40°38′6″N 74°1′40″W
- Area: 1.3 acres (0.53 ha)
- Architect: Silliman Construction Co.
- Architectural style: Late 19th And 20th Century Revivals, Renaissance
- NRHP reference No.: 07000488
- Added to NRHP: June 5, 2007

The houses at 216–264 Ovington Ave. form a national historic district in Bay Ridge, Brooklyn, New York, New York. It consists of 20 contributing residential buildings built between 1908 and 1910. They are brownstone rowhouses with bowed fronts in the Neo-Renaissance style. The houses are two or three stories in height.

It was listed on the National Register of Historic Places in 2007.
