= In Sunlight or in Shadow =

2016 anthology edited by Lawrence Block

- Editor: Lawrence Block
- Language: English
- Publisher: Pegasus Books
- Publication date: December 6, 2016
- Publication place: United States
- Pages: 288
- ISBN: 978-1-68177-245-5

In Sunlight or in Shadow: Stories Inspired by the Paintings of Edward Hopper is a 2016 anthology of short stories inspired by pictures by the American painter Edward Hopper. It was edited by Lawrence Block and contains 17 stories, each by a different author.

== Background ==
Lawrence Block got the idea for the project after finishing an anthology called Dark City Lights. He immediately came up with the title In Sunlight or in Shadow. It is close to the phrase "in sunshine or in shadow" from the song "Danny Boy", but Block thought "sunlight" was more fitting for stories inspired by the paintings of Edward Hopper. Block thinks Hopper may be particularly appealing to writers because his paintings do not tell stories, but rather "suggest that there is a story there to be told".

Block began to compile a list of authors to approach the same afternoon. He stressed to them that all types of stories were desirable. According to Block, almost everybody he asked did select a Hopper painting and submit a story inspired by it.

== Contents ==
- "Foreword: Before We Begin..." by Lawrence Block
- "Girlie Show" by Megan Abbott
- "The Story of Caroline" by Jill D. Block
- "Soir Bleu" by Robert Olen Butler
- "The Truth about what Happened" by Lee Child
- "Rooms by the Sea" by Nicholas Christopher
- "Nighthawks" by Michael Connelly
- "The Incident of 10 November" by Jeffery Deaver
- "Taking Care of Business" by Craig Ferguson
- "The Music Room" by Stephen King
- "The Projectionist" by Joe R. Lansdale
- "The Preacher Collects" by Gail Levin
- "Office at Night" by Warren Moore
- "The Woman in the Window" by Joyce Carol Oates
- "Still Life 1931" by Kris Nelscott
- "Night Windows" by Jonathan Santlofer
- "A Woman in the Sun" by Justin Scott
- "Autumn at the Automat" by Lawrence Block

== Reception ==
Kirkus Reviews wrote that the content in the book "is not cheerful, but the best of it goes deep", and that it "winds up showing how powerful inspiration can be". Publishers Weekly called it a "remarkable collection".
