= Final Call =

(The) Final Call may refer to:

- The Final Call (newspaper), Nation of Islam newspaper
- The Final Call (TV series), a 2019 Indian web television thriller series
- Final Call (album), by Japanese New Age recording artist Kitaro
- Final Call (The Lost Tapes), AZ (rapper)
- The Final Call (album), comedy calls album by Matt Tilley
- The Final Call, a 2001 album by Hawkwind bassist Alan Davey
- "The Final Call", song from Black Market Militia's self titled album
- "The Final Call", a song by Crossfaith from Ark
- "Final Call", a song by D'espairsRay from Monsters
- "Final Call", a song by Noisettes from Contact
- "Final Call", a song by Primal Fear from Rulebreaker
- "Final Call", a song by Shadows Fall from Threads of Life
- "Final Call", a song by Thirteen Senses from Contact

== See also ==
- Last Call (disambiguation)
