= Brooklyn 11223 =

American reality television series

- Genre: Reality
- Starring: Joey Lynn Tekulve; Amanda Gordon; Valona Saka; Nick Biancaniello; Chris Biancaniello; Christie Maria Livoti; Carla Cozzolino; Angelina Favuzza; Karina Gazello; Angelina Favuzza; Danielle Cuccurullo; Denise Centofante; Jennifer DiBitetto; John Guzzone; Kelly Linton; Marco Cozzolino; Maria Leto; Matthew Gordon; Matthew Guzzone
- Country of origin: United States
- Original language: English
- No. of seasons: 1
- No. of episodes: 6

Production
- Executive producers: Ethan Goldman; Lenid Rolov; Michael Hirschorn; Wendy Roth
- Running time: 42 minutes (excluding commercials)
- Production companies: Ish Entertainment; First Look Entertainment

Original release
- Network: Oxygen
- Release: March 26 – April 30, 2012

Brooklyn 11223 is an American reality television series that premiered on Oxygen on March 26, 2012. The series, set in Bay Ridge, Brooklyn and follows the lives of a group of twelve Italian-American men and women in their mid-20s. The series was picked up by MTV Canada and premiered on June 4, 2012.

== Episodes ==
No.	Title	Original release date	U.S. viewers (millions)
1	"Everybody Loves Drama"	March 26, 2012	N/A
The premiere episodes tells the story on how Joey Lynn & Christie's friendship ended. The 2 separate cliques party it up on the streets of Brooklyn but sometimes things take turns for the worst. The day at the beach proves to be eventful when the two cliques face off leading to a heated confrontation between ex-best friends Joey Lynn & Christie & altercation between Kelly & Valona.
2	"There's Always Drama at the Glass Shop"	April 2, 2012	N/A
Christie is overwhelmed by betrayal from Nick leading to a showdown at the glass shop. Matthew is infuriated when he hears about it, but Christie solves things with both guys. Valona decides to come clean to her mother about her tattoos & Kelly and a drunk Angelina get into an altercation with Valona and Amanda.
3	"The Mouth That Never Stops Talking"	April 9, 2012	N/A
Angelina flips on Christie, further tearing the crew apart. Joey Lynn takes a chance at love with Nick from the glass shop but when he doesn't show up on their date, she decides to not go for 11223 guys.
4	"Miami, Brooklyn's Here!"	April 16, 2012	N/A
Christie's crew heads to Vegas to get away from the drama. Joey Lynn's crew heads to Miami for Labor Day weekend, but when things get too boring for Joey Lynn, she questions her friendships and reminisces about Carla. Christie's crew gets feisty & Carla cries over her ex-boyfriend.
5	"I Swear on My Dead Father"	April 23, 2012	0.712
Joey Lynn tries to meet up with Carla so they can put things behind them but when she does, things don't go the way she plans. Carla gets into an altercation with random girls and walks away from Joey Lynn proving that they still aren't going to be friends. The girl who saw everything the night Joey Lynn supposedly seduced Roberto unveils the truth.
6	"It'll Never Be Over"	April 30, 2012	N/A
On the season finale, Matthew and Christie hit a bump in their relationship road. The boys at the glass shop get tired of all the fighting between the two cliques so they decide to get the two cliques all in the same room so they can get over the drama. Joey Lynn and Christie argue and the tension between the two cliques finally breaks leading to a brawl in & out of the bar.

== Cast ==
Name	Hometown	Biography
Joey Lynn Tekulve	Gravesend, Brooklyn	
Amanda Gordon	Bergen Beach, Brooklyn	
Valona Saka	Gerritsen Beach, Brooklyn	
Nick Biancaniello	Brooklyn	
Chris Biancaniello	Brooklyn	
Christie Maria Livoti	Gravesend, Brooklyn	
Carla Cozzolino	Brooklyn	
Angelina Favuzza	Bergen Beach, Brooklyn	
Karina Gazello	Brooklyn	
Danielle Cuccurullo		
Denise Centofante		
Jennifer DiBitetto		
John Guzzone		
Kelly Linton		
Marco Cozzolino		
Maria Leto		
Matthew Gordon		
Matthew Guzzone		
