= Walter Kelleher =

Walter Kelleher was an American photographer from Bay Ridge, Brooklyn. He worked for the New York Daily News (circa) 1920s to his death in 1970.

== Career ==
The "Staff of New York Daily News", of which Kelleher was a part, won a Pulitzer Prize (Photography) in 1956. While the Pulitzer Committee highlighted a 1955 photo of a B26 crash by George Mattson, the award was for the staff's "consistently excellent news picture coverage in 1955". Kelleher was named individually as one of the ten finalists for the 1957 Pulitzer prize. This picture and hundreds more went on to define Kelleher's photojournalism and in 1968 he took Arthur Ashe's picture at the US Open; the Open many went on to describe as the moment that changed tennis history. His photographs live with us and are seen in everyday life.

Sports shows such as ESPN, used his picture of Ebbets Field to describe the top 10 baseball parks ever and Kelleher's love of sports and pop-culture were captured forever in his photographs. His name is sourced under pictures of the great American president John F. Kennedy, Dwight Eisenhower, and Richard Nixon.

Walter Kelleher died of heart failure in 1970 and was survived by his three sons, Donald Kelleher, Richard Kelleher and Thomas.
