= Jerry Rosenberg (pitchman) =

American television salesman (born c. 1934)

Gerald Rosenberg (born c. 1934) was an American television direct-response advertisement salesperson most notable for promoting local businesses. His distinctive balding scalp, rotund body, thick Brooklyn accent and impassioned sales pitches made him a recognized television presence in the United States, primarily in the New York Metropolitan Area.

Rosenberg was the co-owner of JGE (Jamaica Gas & Electric) Appliances, a 40-store appliance chain, along with his brother Charlie. He began with one store in Bayside, Queens, and created what he once called a "$100 million empire." One of the stores was owned by them, and the other 30 were licensed.

Beginning in 1971, Rosenberg appeared in a series of advertisements for JGE that started with the off-screen line "What's the story, Jerry?" and ended with another off-screen line "So that's the story, Jerry?" to which he would reply in his trademark accent "That's the story!"

Rosenberg ran the business with his brother Charles. In 1974, The New York Times said they "may well be the first appliance merchants who have made the media the message."

He presented himself as a friend of the working man, union members, civil service employees, and their families, who were the only customers allowed in the stores. JGE's sales increased from $2 million in 1971 to an estimated $50 million in 1974.

By the mid-1970s, he began advertising for other businesses such as jewelry stores, furniture retailers, and discothèques, all in the same style as those of his appliance chain, with the same union-member discounts.

In December 1974, New York City sued Rosenberg, his brother Charles and JGE Enterprises in New York State Supreme Court. The suit sought $250,000 in restitution for victimized customers, claiming deceptive advertising. Elinor C. Guggenheimer, the city's Commissioner of Consumer Affairs, said that JGE lured customers into leaving large deposits for furniture and appliances that would arrive months later, damaged. The city had received 300 consumer complaints. Rosenberg denied the charges.

Rosenberg countersued the city for libel, abuse of process and conspiracy. His company was defunct by 1977, when The New York Times reported that he had placed a "positions wanted" advertisement in The Wall Street Journal, stating that he was "ready for a challenge," and seeking a position in sales, merchandising, advertising or public relations.
