= A Walk Among the Tombstones (film) =

2014 film directed by Scott Frank

- Theatrical release poster
- Directed by: Scott Frank
- Screenplay by: Scott Frank
- Based on: A Walk Among the Tombstones by Lawrence Block
- Produced by: Danny DeVito; Michael Shamberg; Stacey Sher; Brian Oliver; Tobin Armbrust
- Starring: Liam Neeson; Dan Stevens; David Harbour; Boyd Holbrook
- Cinematography: Mihai Mălaimare Jr.
- Edited by: Jill Savitt
- Music by: Carlos Rafael Rivera
- Production companies: Cross Creek Pictures; Endgame Entertainment; 1984 Private Defense Contractors; Exclusive Media; Jersey Films; Double Feature Films
- Distributed by: Universal Pictures
- Release date: September 19, 2014
- Running time: 114 minutes
- Country: United States
- Language: English
- Budget: $23–28 million
- Box office: $62.1 million

A Walk Among the Tombstones is a 2014 American neo-noir action thriller film directed and written by Scott Frank, and based on the 1992 novel by Lawrence Block. It stars Liam Neeson, Dan Stevens, David Harbour, and Boyd Holbrook. The film was released on September 19, 2014. The film received mostly positive reviews from critics and grossed $62 million worldwide against a $28 million budget, making it a modest success. Although Frank and Neeson hoped for further adaptations, no more films have been made as of 2025.

== Plot ==
One morning in 1991, alcoholic NYPD Detective Matt Scudder is drinking at his usual bar when three criminals kill the bartender in an attempted shakedown. Scudder pursues them and, in a chaotic gun battle, kills two and cripples the third.

Eight years later, Scudder is retired and sober, working as an unlicensed private investigator. Peter Kristo, a fellow Alcoholics Anonymous member struggling with heroin addiction, introduces Scudder to his brother Kenny, a wealthy drug trafficker. Kenny explains that his wife Carrie was abducted and though he delivered the ransom, the kidnappers dismembered her, leaving him a recording of her brutal rape and murder. Agreeing to find the killers, Scudder visits the New York Public Library to research similar murders and meets TJ, a homeless teen with a knack for detective work.

Scudder comes across the murders of two other women: Leila Andresen, whose dismembered body was found in a pond at Green-Wood Cemetery, and Marie Gotteskind, a low-level drug dealer. He discerns that Leila's fiancé, Reuben Quintana, is also tied to the drug trade, and questions both him and Jonas Loogan, the cemetery groundskeeper. Reuben tells Scudder he saw three men grab Leila and force her into a van. After catching TJ following him and reluctantly enlisting his help, Scudder tails Jonas to a shack atop an apartment building across the street from Reuben's and discovers evidence Jonas was stalking Leila. Jonas admits he wanted to save Leila from Reuben and was approached by two men who claimed to be DEA agents, helping them kidnap Leila and fleeing when they began torturing her. Overcome with guilt, Jonas steps off the roof after telling Scudder that one of the kidnappers called himself Ray.

While searching the neighborhood Marie dealt drugs out of, Scudder is attacked by two dealers who tell him she was an undercover DEA agent. Scudder realizes the killers are using her files to target local dealers, kidnapping their loved ones for ransom and murdering them anyway. He tells Kenny to spread the word amongst his fellow dealers, knowing the pair intend to keep their scheme going.

After noticing a white van with a fake company logo following him, Scudder is accosted by DEA agents who deny knowing Marie and attempt to pressure him into admitting he is working for Kenny. He confronts Peter, who had informed on Kenny to Marie out of jealousy, unknowingly providing the information that allowed the killers to kidnap Carrie. TJ is beaten by neighborhood dealers for stealing a handgun, and Scudder visits him in the hospital to learn he has sickle cell anemia. Scudder reveals that a young girl was accidentally killed in the shootout in 1991, prompting him to quit the force and swear off drinking.

One of Kenny's fellow traffickers, Yuri Landau, discovers his teenage daughter Lucia was taken by the killers, Ray and Albert, while caring for her ailing mother. When the kidnappers call, Scudder convinces them to return Lucia alive in exchange for one million dollars. Meeting at Green-Wood, Scudder delivers the money and Lucia is reunited with her father, but Albert discovers much of the cash is counterfeit. In the ensuing shootout, Peter is killed while Albert and a wounded Ray escape in their van, unaware TJ is hiding in the back.

TJ sees Albert strangle Ray and calls Scudder, leading him and Kenny to the killers' house. Leaving Albert's fate in Kenny's hands, Scudder sends TJ to his apartment in a taxi, but returns to find Albert has broken free and killed Kenny. Albert ambushes Scudder and attacks him with a cleaver, but Scudder subdues him with Ray's taser before shooting him in the head. Watching from afar as police arrive, Scudder returns home.

== Cast ==
- Liam Neeson as Matthew Scudder, a former NYPD detective and alcoholic who is now operating as a Private Investigator
- Dan Stevens as Kenny Kristo, a drug trafficker whose wife fell victim to the kidnappers
- Boyd Holbrook as Peter Kristo, Kenny's junkie Brother who participated in AA with Scudder
- Ólafur Darri Ólafsson as Jonas Loogan, the groundskeeper for the cemetery and pigeon keeper who helped the kidnappers
- Brian "Astro" Bradley as T.J., a homeless teen and aspiring detective who assists Scudder in his case
- Mark Consuelos as Reuben Quintana, a drug trafficker whose fiancé fell victim to the kidnappers and murderers
- David Harbour as Ray, one of the kidnappers known for their psychotic killings
- Adam David Thompson as Albert, one of the kidnappers known for their psychotic killings
- Sebastian Roché as Yuri Landau, a Russian drug trafficker whose daughter fell victim to the kidnappers
- Laura Birn as Leila Andresen, a victim of the kidnappers and a fiancé to Reuben Quintana
- Razane Jammal as Carrie Kristo, a victim of the kidnappers and wife to Kenny Kristo
- Leon Addison Brown as Agent Stover, a DEA Team leader who had Scudder under surveillance
- Danielle Rose Russell as Ludmilla 'Lucia' Landau, a victim of the kidnappers and Yuri's daughter
- Marielle Heller as DEA Agent Marie Gotteskind, a victim of the kidnappers whose files on the traffickers were the blueprint for their schemes
- Frank de Julio as Eduardo Solomon, a store owner connected to Gotteskind
- Maurice Compte as Detective Danny Ortiz, Scudder ex-Partner

== Development ==
Scott Frank first read the novel A Walk Among the Tombstones by Lawrence Block in 1998. The book is the tenth in a series featuring the character of Matthew Scudder. Frank said about the book: "What was interesting about this story is that it wasn't just a mystery, it was also frightening, intense— it was a real thriller. I always knew that if I was ever going to do any of the Scudder books it would be this one. Frank's screenplay also features elements from the first novel in the series The Sins of the Fathers and the ninth, A Dance at the Slaughterhouse. In May 2002 it was announced that Harrison Ford was in talks to play Scudder with Joe Carnahan also in talks to direct for Universal Pictures for a proposed start on production in January 2003. Ford subsequently dropped out of the project. According to Frank, Ford was concerned about the darkness in the character of Scudder. After Ford dropped out, Universal put the project in turnaround. In 2014 Frank said: "At the time, movies like this were not getting made. Without him it didn't stand a chance. And there wasn't really anybody the right age that could help us get it made."

In June 2011 it was announced that Cross Creek Pictures would finance the film with D. J. Caruso in talks to direct. Caruso subsequently dropped out to make Invertigo for Sony Pictures. In May 2012 Liam Neeson was announced as Scudder, with Frank himself directing, and production slated to begin February 2013. Frank stated that without Neeson, the film would not have been made. Block supported the casting of Neeson, saying he had thought of the actor as an ideal choice for Scudder ever since seeing Michael Collins.

== Production ==
Filming began on March 3, 2013, in New York City. Locations featured in the film include Green-Wood Cemetery. Filming at the cemetery had to be adandoned one time due to lightning. The kitchen and basement of the killers Ray and Albert was built at Stage 1 of Broadway Stages in Greenpoint, Brooklyn. Block visited the set several times and filmed a cameo which ended up being cut from the film.

== Editing ==
Frank admitted he was unhappy with his first cut of the film, and screened it for friends Tony Gilroy and Steven Soderbergh to get their input.

As Frank explained, he did extensive filming of camera coverage in anticipation of his belief studio executives would demand substantial edits to the final film. He completed a preliminarily rough cut of the film, which he found disappointing. “It wasn't working for me and I couldn't figure out why. It seemed to be fighting itself, and I couldn't understand what it was. So I showed it to my toughest friend I know, Steven Soderbergh. He watched the movie, and the first thing he said when the lights came up is, 'You didn't cut it the way you shot it. You need to cut this movie the way you shot this movie.’” There were never demands for edits, and Frank attributed his first version of the film to a “failure of nerves” on his part. He added: “We then stuck to our guns. We cut the movie the way it was supposed to be cut from that point on." Over three weeks Frank and Soderbergh recut the entire film. In total, twenty minutes were removed from the original cut of the film.

Gilroy suggested eliminating scenes with the character Jo Durkin, a cop friend from Scudder's past, played by Ruth Wilson. Frank praised Wilson's performance, but decided Scudder was a stronger character on his own. Neeson's real-life son Micheál Richardson was featured in another cut subplot as Scudder's son. Neeson supported the removal of this part, saying: “It didn't belong, it cluttered things up."

== Release ==
The MPAA classified the film as rated R for "strong violence, disturbing images, language, and brief nudity". On January 30, 2014, it was announced the film would be released on September 19, 2014.

=== Home media ===
Universal Studios Home Entertainment released A Walk Among the Tombstones on DVD and Blu-ray on January 13, 2015.

== Reception ==
=== Box office ===
A Walk Among the Tombstones grossed $26 million in the United States and Canada, and $36.1 million in other territories, for a worldwide total gross of $62.1 million, against its $28 million budget.

The film earned $428,000 from Thursday night from 1,918 theaters, and $4.7 million from 2,712 theaters on its opening day. It debuted at number two at the box office on its opening weekend earning $13.1 million behind The Maze Runner ($32.5 million).

=== Critical response ===
On review aggregator Rotten Tomatoes, the film holds an approval rating of 68% based on 165 reviews, with an average rating of 6.20/10. The site's critical consensus reads, "A Walk Among the Tombstones doesn't entirely transcend its genre clichés, but it does offer Liam Neeson one of his more compelling roles in recent memory, and that's often enough." On Metacritic, the film has a weighted average score of 57 out of 100, based on 36 critics, indicating "mixed or average" reviews. Audiences polled by CinemaScore gave the film an average grade of "B−" on an A+ to F scale.

Richard Roeper gave the film a B+ rating, calling the film "a stylish and smart thriller". Manohla Dargis in The New York Times called it "one of those rare cinematic offerings: intelligent pulp" but also noted that the film "can be tough to watch, particularly its fleeting images of tortured women". In Variety, Andrew Barker found it a well-made thriller "with a good deal of panache and style". On October 18, 2013, Block tweeted that he had seen the film, praising the performance of Neeson and Frank's writing and direction.

== Sequel ==
Neeson stated that both he and Frank wanted to do a sequel but that it would be dependent on the box-office performance of the film. Neeson hoped that in any sequel that they could delve more into Scudder's past.
