= When the Sacred Ginmill Closes =

1986 novel by Lawrence Block

- First edition
- Author: Lawrence Block
- Language: English
- Series: Matthew Scudder
- Genre: Mystery
- Publisher: Arbor House
- Publication date: 1986
- Publication place: United States
- Media type: Print
- Pages: 239
- ISBN: 978-0-87795-774-4
- OCLC: 12420085
- Preceded by: 8 Million Ways to Die (1982)
- Followed by: Out on the Cutting Edge (1989)

When the Sacred Ginmill Closes is a Matthew Scudder novel, written by Lawrence Block. Based on the short story "By the Dawn's Early Light", and published four years after Eight Million Ways to Die, this novel resurrected Block's interest in the character and led to his writing 10 more titles in the series. The book's title derives from the Dave Van Ronk song "Last Call".

== Plot ==
This Matthew Scudder noir crime novel starts out much like the previous books in the series. Matt is still drinking heavily and solving crimes as an "unofficial" private detective in gritty New York. There are three separate mysteries that are intertwined, involving multiple dead bodies, stolen money and other complications. But the real story is Matt's drinking and how it affects his work.

== Awards ==
=== Wins ===
- 1987 Falcon Award

=== Nominations ===
- 1987 Anthony award, Best Novel
- 1987 Shamus Award, Best Nove
