= Joel Landau =

American investor (born 1980)

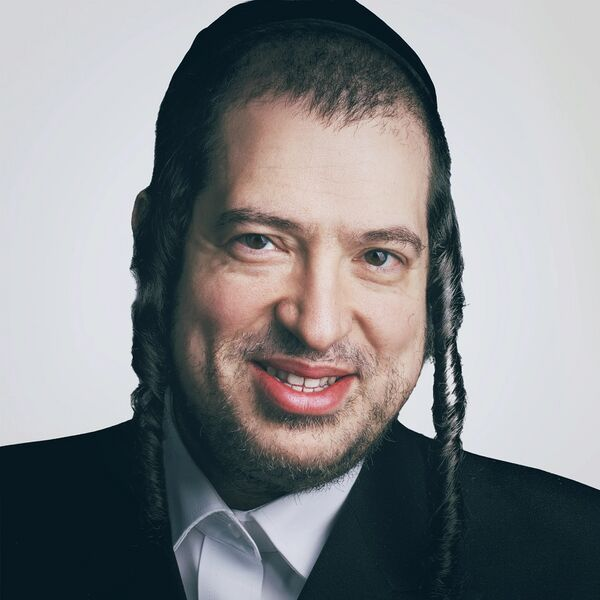
- Landau in 2025
- Born: August 22, 1980 (age 46); Monroe, New York, United States
- Other name: Yoely Landau
- Occupation: Co-founder
- Employer: Allure Group
- Website: joellandau.com

Joel Landau (Yiddish: יואל לאנדא; born August 22, 1980) is an American entrepreneur and health care industry executive. He is the founder of the Allure Group, which specializes in purchasing nursing homes and rehabilitation facilities in the United States that are in danger of closing, and AlphaCare company.

== Early life and education ==
Landau was born and raised in Monroe, New York, studying at the United Talmudical Academy, where he graduated in 1999. He belongs to the Satmar Hasidic community.

== Career ==
Landau co-founded AlphaCare in 2012, to insure and provide community-based long term care and support services for high risk elderly individuals who reside in the New York City area. AlphaCare was one of 25 businesses with a state license to provide care to Medicare dual eligible citizens. AlphaCare had changed to become a one product provider and required individuals to have Medicaid and not Medicare as they did previously by 2017.

He created The Allure Group to rescue skilled nursing homes that were in desperate need of improvement, and would otherwise face closure. The deed for the sale included a covenant that prevented the property from being developed like many of the buildings in the same district, stating that the building had to be used for non-profit residential health care. Despite this, the restriction was removed by the city of New York, which allowed Landau to sell the property for $116 million to developers in 2017. The sale was approved by New York City deputy mayor Anthony Shorris, without the knowledge of mayor Bill de Blasio, despite Landau owing $6 million in back taxes to the city. After it was reported that plans to redevelop the property into luxury housing were made before the sale had closed, the Attorney General of New York began an investigation. Landau agreed to pay $2 million in penalties and charitable donations to local nonprofits in a 2018 deal with New York State Attorney General Eric Schneiderman related to the sale.

He is a member of the Forbes New York Business Council.

== Political positions ==
He criticized the Ger Hasidic leadership in the Israeli political party Agudat Yisrael for taking money from the government and compromising their religious views. He advocated that they should become more independent and self-sufficient, so they can opt out of Israeli society and expectations, particularly the draft.
