= A Walk Among the Tombstones (novel) =

1992 crime thriller novel

- Author: Lawrence Block
- Language: English
- Publication date: 1992

A Walk Among the Tombstones is a 1992 crime thriller novel by Lawrence Block. It is the tenth novel to feature Matthew Scudder, an ex-cop and private investigator.

The film adaptation of the novel was released on September 19, 2014. It was written and directed by Scott Frank, with Liam Neeson playing the lead role.

== Reception ==
David Delman of the Philadelphia Inquirer wrote, "The story is compelling, the suspense is relentless, and Block's prose rises to whatever is demanded of it — always uncluttered, never pretentious, tender and tough by turns." Bill Spurgeon of The Star Press said, "Lawrence Block is a graphic writer, and in dealing with crimes of violence he pulls no punches." Jack Wood in the Cincinnati Enquirer called the novel "an exciting, satisfying story with one caveat - it veers close enough to the brutal in some passages to make you squirm." John Bret-Harte in the Arizona Daily Star found that Block "handles dialogue as well as any writer working today."
