= Matthew Scudder =

- First appearance: The Sins of the Fathers
- Last appearance: The Autobiography of Matthew Scudder
- Created by: Lawrence Block
- Portrayed by: Jeff Bridges; Liam Neeson

In-universe information
- Gender: Male
- Occupation: Private detective
- Nationality: American

Matthew (Matt) Scudder is a fictional character who appears in novels by American crime writer Lawrence Block.

== Fictional biography ==
Scudder debuted in 1976's The Sins of the Fathers as an alcoholic ex-cop who had recently quit the NYPD and left his family after accidentally causing the death of a young girl. Living in a rent-controlled hotel room in Hell's Kitchen, he earns his living as an unlicensed private investigator—or, as he puts it, "doing favors for friends".

The fifth entry, 1982's Eight Million Ways to Die concludes with Scudder introducing himself at an Alcoholics Anonymous meeting. Block planned to end the series there, but a promise he'd made to supply an editor friend with an original short story resulted in "By the Dawn's Early Light", a story set during Scudder's drinking days in the 1970s (Abe Beame is mentioned as New York mayor) but told from the perspective of a recovering addict. The story won a Shamus Award for best short story of 1985. Block would go on to expand on that success with 1986's When the Sacred Ginmill Closes.

From then on, Scudder's circumstances rarely remain the same for long. In Out On the Cutting Edge (1989), while looking into a missing prostitute he meets Mick Ballou, a brutal Irish mafia member and saloonkeeper who improbably becomes one of his best friends. 1990's A Ticket to the Boneyard reunites him with Elaine Mardell, a hooker from his days on the force, and concludes with him staging the suicide of a man who had threatened their lives. 1991's A Dance at the Slaughterhouse introduces TJ, a young Times Square hustler who becomes Scudder's protégé and closest ally. 1992's A Walk Among the Tombstones sees him struggling with Elaine's role as a prostitute (as well as a pair of violent kidnappers), while 1994's A Long Line of Dead Men ends with the two marrying.

While Scudder never takes another drink (coming closest in Boneyard), alcohol continues to play a large role in his life: he continues to attend Alcoholics Anonymous meetings (which constitute a central setting of the later novels), and have long late-night conversations with Ballou. He also has a standing Sunday night dinner with his sponsor, Jim Faber, who eventually becomes a surrogate father figure.

Scudder's friendship with Ballou comes back to haunt him in Everybody Dies (1999). A gang war claims the lives of several of Scudder's friends due to his association with Ballou, but he afterwards stays close with Ballou.

2005's All the Flowers Are Dying, the sixteenth title in the series, seemed to have been written as a possible final chapter. However, a new Scudder book, titled A Drop of the Hard Stuff,—a second "flashback" novel—was published in 2011 and again set in the 1970s but during Scudder's first year of sobriety. The novella A Time to Scatter Stones was published in 2019, featuring an aging Scudder helping friends of his wife Elaine who want to escape sex work.

== List of Matthew Scudder novels ==
- The Sins of the Fathers (1976)
- In the Midst of Death (1976) (#3 in the series)
- Time to Murder and Create (1977) (#2 in the series)
- A Stab in the Dark (1981)
- Eight Million Ways to Die (1982)
- When the Sacred Ginmill Closes (1986)
- Out on the Cutting Edge (1989)
- A Ticket to the Boneyard (1990)
- A Dance at the Slaughterhouse (1991)
- A Walk Among the Tombstones (1992)
- The Devil Knows You're Dead (1993)
- A Long Line of Dead Men (1994)
- Even the Wicked (1997)
- Everybody Dies (1998)
- Hope to Die (2001)
- All the Flowers Are Dying (2005)
- A Drop of the Hard Stuff (2011)
- The Night and the Music (2011) (short story anthology)
- A Time to Scatter Stones (2019) (novella)
- The Night and the Music (2021) (2nd edition of the 2011 short story anthology. Includes all the original stories, plus the 2019 novella A Time to Scatter Stones)
- The Autobiography of Matthew Scudder (2023)

== In other media ==
- The character of Matthew Scudder was portrayed by Jeff Bridges in 8 Million Ways to Die, in which the setting was moved to Southern California and characterized Scudder as a sheriff's deputy. The movie alters his backstory; in the film, he kills an adult drug dealer in front of the dealer's family rather than a young girl on a darkened street. Reviews were poor and the film was a box office bomb.
- Matthew is played by Liam Neeson in A Walk Among the Tombstones (2014), a performance that was well received by Block. The movie also used Scudder's original backstory as depicted in the novels. This film was a modest financial success and earned better reviews than the previous Scudder film, but no further Scudder movies are known to be in the works.
