= Lawrence Block =

American writer of crime fiction (born 1938)

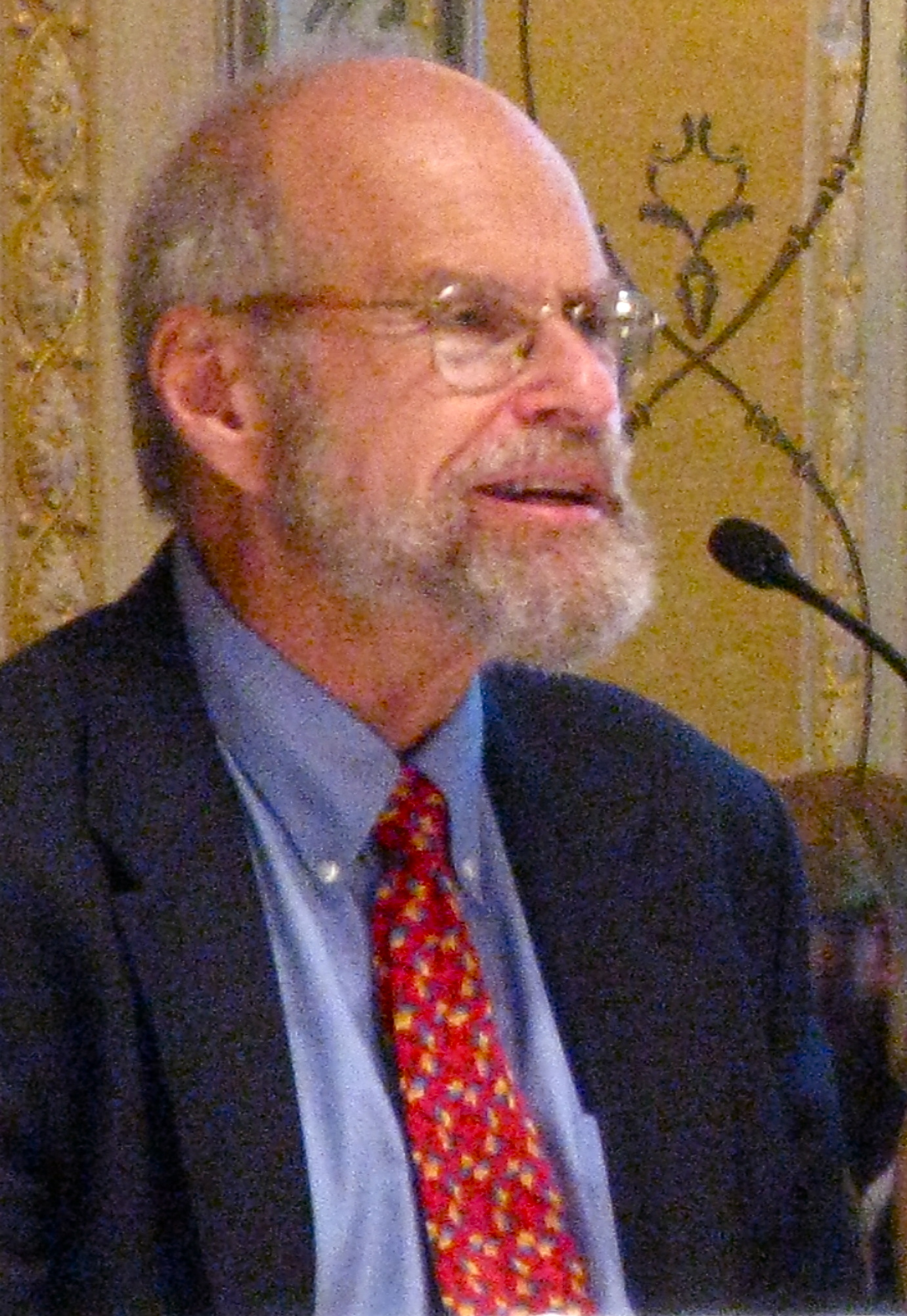
- Block in 2008
- Born: June 24, 1938 (age 88); Buffalo, New York, U.S.
- Occupations: Novelist, short story writer
- Writing career
- Pen name: Chip Harrison, Paul Kavanagh, Lee Duncan, Sheldon Lord, others
- Period: 1958–present
- Genres: Crime fiction, mystery fiction
- Website: lawrenceblock.com

Lawrence Block (born June 24, 1938) is an American crime writer best known for two long-running New York-set series about the recovering alcoholic P.I. Matthew Scudder and the gentleman burglar Bernie Rhodenbarr. Block was named a Grand Master by the Mystery Writers of America in 1994. Block has written in the genres of crime, mystery, and suspense fiction for more than half a century, releasing over 100 books.

== Early life ==
Lawrence Block was born June 24, 1938 in Buffalo, New York, where he was raised. He attended Antioch College in Yellow Springs, Ohio, but left before graduating. Block is Jewish.

== Career ==
Block's earliest work, published pseudonymously in the 1950s, was mostly in the soft-porn mass market paperback industry, an apprenticeship he shared with fellow mystery author Donald E. Westlake. Block describes the early sex novels as a valuable experience, noting that, despite the titillating content of the books (rather mild by later standards of adult fiction), he was expected to write fully developed novels with plausible plots, characters and conflicts. He further credits the softcore novels as a factor in his prolific output; writing 15 to 20 sex novels per year to support himself financially, Block was forced to learn to write in a manner that required little revision and editing of his first drafts. His first novel was a lesbian fiction titled Strange Are the Ways of Love, written under the name Lesley Evans. In 2016, Block reissued this novel with a new title Shadows, under another of his pseudonyms, Jill Emerson.

The first of his work to appear under his own name was the 1957 story "You Can't Lose," for the crime/adventure magazine Manhunt. The first novel to be published under Block's name was Grifter's Game (1961). It started as an erotic novel but, as Block would later write, "I decided it might be a cut above what I'd been writing, so I wrote it as a crime novel with the hope it might work for Gold Medal." He has since published more than fifty novels and more than a hundred short stories, as well as a series of books for writers.

Block has lived in New York City for decades, setting most of his fiction there, and has come to be very closely associated with the city. He is married to Lynne Block. He has three daughters, Amy Reichel, Jill Block and Alison Pouliot, from an earlier marriage. With Lynne, he spends much of his time traveling (the two have been to 135 countries), but continues to consider New York his home.

He was a regular guest on The Late Late Show with Craig Ferguson (2005–2015), appearing in eight of Ferguson's ten seasons as host of the program.

Considerable autobiographical information on the earlier phase of his life and career may be found scattered through Telling Lies for Fun and Profit (1981), a collection of his fiction columns from Writer's Digest.

In 2005 he was honored with the Gumshoe Lifetime Achievement Award.

Block is an alumnus of the Ragdale Foundation.

=== Recurring characters ===
==== Matthew Scudder ====
Block's most famous creation, the ever-evolving Matthew Scudder, was introduced in 1976's The Sins of the Fathers as an alcoholic ex-cop working as an unlicensed private investigator in Hell's Kitchen. Originally published as paperbacks, the early novels are in many ways interchangeable; the second and third entries—In the Midst of Death (1976) and Time to Murder and Create (1977)—were written in the opposite order from their publication dates. 1982's 8 Million Ways to Die (filmed in 1986 by Hal Ashby) breaks from that trend, concluding with Scudder introducing himself at an Alcoholics Anonymous meeting. The series was set to end on that note, but an idle promise Block had made to supply an editor friend with an original Scudder short resulted in "By the Dawn's Early Light", a story set during the character's drinking days, but told from the perspective of a recovering alcoholic. Block expanded on that with 1986's When the Sacred Ginmill Closes (named for a line in a song by folk singer Dave Van Ronk, a close friend), which proved not only one of the more literary entries, but also a favorite of the author and his fans. From then on, Scudder's circumstances rarely remain the same from one book to the next; 1990's A Ticket to the Boneyard, for example, reunites him with Elaine Mardell, a hooker from his days on the force, whom he marries several books later. Other fan favorites are 1991's taut, gruesome A Dance at the Slaughterhouse (winner of the Edgar Award for Best [mystery] Novel), and 1993's A Long Line of Dead Men, a tightly plotted puzzler featuring a rapidly dwindling fraternity known as the "Club of 31". A Walk Among the Tombstones, published in 1992, was made into a film, released in 2014, written and directed by Scott Frank, with Liam Neeson playing the lead role. The seventeenth entry, A Drop of the Hard Stuff was published in May 2011.

It has been suggested that Scudder's struggle with alcoholism is in part autobiographical; while Block has repeatedly refused to discuss the subject, citing AA's own tradition of anonymity, in a column he wrote for Writer's Digest, Block wrote that when he created Scudder, "I let him hang out in the same saloon where I spent a great deal of my own time. I was drinking pretty heavily around that time, and I made him a pretty heavy drinker, too. I drank whiskey, sometimes mixing it with coffee. So did Scudder."

==== Bernie Rhodenbarr ====
Block's other major series, humorous and much lighter in tone, relates the misadventures of gentleman burglar Bernie Rhodenbarr. The series is rich in sophisticated, witty dialogue.

Unlike Scudder, Rhodenbarr is ageless, remaining essentially the same from 1977's Burglars Can't Be Choosers, to the twelfth and most recent entry, 2022's The Burglar Who Met Fredric Brown. The only significant advancements come in the third volume, The Burglar Who Liked to Quote Kipling (1979, winner of the first annual Nero Award) which sees Bernie having used the spoils from his previous caper to buy a bookstore, and introduces Carolyn Kaiser, his lesbian "soulmate" and partner in crime. The plots run very much to form: Bernie breaks into a residence (usually on Manhattan's Upper East Side) and, through a series of implausible events, becomes involved in a murder investigation—often as the prime suspect. Not even an eleven-year hiatus (between 1983's The Burglar Who Painted Like Mondrian and 1994's The Burglar Who Traded Ted Williams) would see that basic formula change. There is, however, a meta quality to the more recent entries: Bernie, the reluctant detective, is himself a bookseller and genre fan, and is apt to make references to Agatha Christie, E.W. Hornung (his cat is named "Raffles"), Dashiell Hammett, Raymond Chandler, Sue Grafton and John Sandford, among others. The Burglar Who Thought He Was Bogart (1995) exploits this to full effect: set during a Humphrey Bogart film festival, the story is itself inspired by many of the actor's most famous roles. The Burglar in the Library (1997) similarly imagines a meeting between Hammett and Chandler at a New England inn in the 1940s, casting a volume inscribed by Chandler to Hammett as its own Maltese Falcon. In The Burglar in the Rye, Bernie helps track down a writer clearly based on J. D. Salinger.

The second novel, The Burglar in The Closet, was filmed in 1987 as Burglar, with Whoopi Goldberg as Bernie (or Bernice).

==== Evan Michael Tanner ====
Besides Scudder and Rhodenbarr, Block has written eight novels about Evan Tanner, an adventurer and accidental revolutionary who, as a result of an injury sustained in the Korean War, cannot sleep. All but the last of these were published in the 1960s and early 1970s (beginning with 1966's The Thief Who Couldn't Sleep), while the most recent, 1998's Tanner on Ice, revived the character after nearly a thirty-year hiatus.

==== Chip Harrison ====
Chip Harrison, motivated by lust and curiosity, originally appeared in two funny, non-mystery novels which revolved around seventeen-year-old Chip's obsessive quest to lose his virginity: No Score and Chip Harrison Scores Again.

Realizing the series did not have much of a future once Chip reached his goal, Block puts Chip to work as an assistant to Leo Haig, an admirer of sleuth Nero Wolfe who models himself after his hero (e.g., Wolfe raises tropical flowers, Haig raises tropical fish). They appeared in two subsequent, decidedly tongue-in-cheek mystery novels: Make Out With Murder and The Topless Tulip Caper, and a handful of short stories.

==== Keller ====
Four episodic novels — Hit Man (1998), Hit List (2000), Hit Parade (2006) and Hit Me (2013) — as well as the full-length novel Hit and Run (2008), chronicle the life of Keller, a lonely, wistful hitman who originally appeared as a semi-regular feature in Playboy magazine in the 1990s. Most of the novels are fix-ups of related short stories; Hit and Run is the only Keller novel conceived of and written as a single story. In 2016, a new novella was published, Keller's Fedora, in which Keller is persuaded to come out of retirement for one last job.

Keller's full name is John Paul Keller (a fact mentioned rarely, and almost in passing, in several books), although he is almost always addressed simply as Keller. The stories are rarely action-oriented or focused on the details of his crimes, instead being character studies of Keller's personality and the people he meets (e.g., Keller's being hired to kill a major league baseball designated hitter but postponing the act and following the team to away games so the hitter can reach the career milestone of 400 home runs). Originally based in New York City, after a disastrous hit gone wrong he later relocates to New Orleans where he lives under the name "Nicholas Edwards" and marries, has a child and works in construction. Keller receives assignments via a contact named Dot, who is originally based in White Plains. His assignments usually take him to different cities, where he often envisions himself retiring from the business, daydreaming about settling there, before finishing off the assignment and returning, his fantasies forgotten as a passing dream. Keller's pastime is stamp collecting, to which he is nearly obsessively devoted. He collects non-U.S. issues, prior to 1940, with a particular interest in stamps from former colonies of the French Empire.

Hit and Run was nominated for the CWA Gold Dagger at the 2009 Crime Thriller Awards.

=== Other works ===
Small Town (2003), Block's first non-series book in fifteen years, details a group of New Yorkers' varying responses to the terrorist attacks of September 11, 2001. Block has also written dozens of short stories over the years, and he is the only four-time winner of the Edgar Award for Best Short Story. The 2002 collection Enough Rope compiles stories, 84 in all, from earlier collections, such as Like a Lamb to Slaughter and Sometimes They Bite, along with new and previously uncollected stories.

Block describes series character Martin H. Ehrengraf as a dapper little criminal defense lawyer whose clients all turn out to be innocent. Ehrengraf charges a mere $1 retainer fee and afterwards works on contingency; he gets paid a massive fee if and only if his clients are cleared of wrongdoing. When his clients are cleared, it's because Ehrengraf has committed misdeeds up to and including murder to exonerate his client and often frame another for the crimes. The first short story featuring Ehrengraf, "The Ehrengraf Defense," was published in Ellery Queen's Mystery Magazine in 1978. By 2003, twelve stories had been published and in 2012 Block completed an eleventh story, "The Ehrengraf Settlement." All eleven were collected and published in an eVolume, Ehrengraf For The Defense (2012).

In addition to writing the scripts for a handful of television episodes over the years—including, in 2005, two episodes of the ESPN series Tilt—Block co-wrote the screenplay for My Blueberry Nights, a 2007 film directed by Wong Kar-wai and starring Norah Jones.

== Awards and nominations ==
Work	Year & Award	Category	Result	Ref.
Time to Murder and Create	1978 Edgar Allan Poe Award	Paperback Original	Shortlisted	
The Burglar Who Liked to Quote Kipling	1979 Nero Award		Won	
Eight Million Ways to Die	1983 Shamus Award	P. I. Hardcover Novel	Won	
Eight Million Ways to Die	1983 Edgar Allan Poe Award	Novel	Shortlisted	
"By Dawn's Early Light"	1985 Edgar Allan Poe Award	Short Story	Won	
"Like a Bug on a Windshield"	1985 Readers Choice Award		2nd Place	
When the Sacred Ginmill Closes	1987 Macavity Awards	Mystery Novel	Nominated	
When the Sacred Ginmill Closes	1987 Maltese Falcon Society	Falcon Award	Won	
When the Sacred Ginmill Closes	1987 Anthony Awards	Novel	Nominated	
"Answers to Soldiers"	1991 Edgar Allan Poe Award	Short Story	Shortlisted	
A Ticket to the Boneyard	1991 Anthony Awards	Novel	Nominated	
A Ticket to the Boneyard	1992 Maltese Falcon Society	Falcon Award	Won	
"A Blow for Freedom"	1992 Edgar Allan Poe Award	Short Story	Shortlisted	
A Dance at the Slaughterhouse	1992 Edgar Allan Poe Award	Novel	Won	
The Devil Knows You're Dead	1994 Shamus Award	P. I. Hardcover Novel	Won	
"Keller's Therapy"	1994 Edgar Allan Poe Award	Short Story	Won	
Some Days You Get The Bear	1994 Anthony Awards	Short Story Collection/Anthology	Nominated	
A Long Line of Dead Men	1995 Edgar Allan Poe Award	Novel	Shortlisted	
"Keller on the Spot"	1998 Edgar Allan Poe Award	Short Story	Won	
"Looking for David"	1999 Edgar Allan Poe Award	Short Story	Shortlisted	
Master's Choice II	2001 Anthony Awards	Anthology/Short-Story collection	Won	
Matthew Scudder	2009 Shamus Award	Best P. I. Series Character	Won	
Hit and Run	2009 Crime Writers' Association	Gold Dagger	Shortlisted	
The Burglar Who Counted the Spoons	2015 Crimefest Awards	Goldsboro Last Laugh Award	Shortlisted	
In Sunlight or in Shadow	2017 Anthony Award	Anthology	Nominated	
In Sunlight or in Shadow	2017 Killer Nashville Awards	2017 Readers’ Choice Award: Best Fiction Adult Anthology/Collection	Finalist	
"Autumn at the Automat"	2017 Macavity Awards	Mystery Short Story	Nominated	
"Autumn at the Automat"	2017 Edgar Allan Poe Award	Short Story	Won	
"Autumn at the Automat"	2017 Anthony Award	Short Story	Nominated	
	1994 Mystery Writers of America	Grand Master Award	Won	
	2002 Shamus Award	Lifetime Achievement Award	Won	
	2004 Crime Writers' Association	Cartier Diamond Dagger	Won	
	2005 Gumshoe Awards	Lifetime Achievement	Won	
