= Sansuke Yamada =

Japanese manga artist, illustrator, and musician

Sansuke Yamada 山田参助
- Born: 1972 (age 53–54) Toyonaka, Osaka Prefecture
- Areas: Manga artist, illustrator, musician
- Notable works: Areyo Hoshikuzu
- Awards: Japan Cartoonists Association Award, Tezuka Osamu Cultural Prize

Sansuke Yamada (山田参助, Yamada Sansuke; born 1972) is a Japanese manga artist, illustrator, and musician. He is noted for his early career in gay manga, as the lead singer of the kayōkyoku group Tomari, and for his 2013 award-winning manga series Areyo Hoshikuzu (あれよ星屑; transl. Alas, Stardust).

== Biography ==
Yamada was born in 1972 in Toyonaka, Osaka Prefecture. He began drawing manga in the fourth grade, and developed an interest the history of post-occupation Japan before studying at the Osaka University of Arts. Yamada cites among his early influences the films of Shoichi Ozawa; left-wing literary works by Ryusuke Saito, Miyoko Matsutani, Akiyuki Nosaka, and Komimasa Tanaka; historic news photography published by Mainichi Shimbun; Fujio Akatsuka's Introduction to Manga; and the television series Ōedo Sōsamō.

In 1991, Yamada made his debut as a manga artist, writing and illustrating a dōjinshi about comfort women. In 1994, he began to publish professionally as a gay manga artist, appearing in the gay interest magazines Sabu and Samson. Yamada would become a regular contributor to both magazines, and was the exclusive cover illustrator for Samson in 2005. In 2010, Yamada contributed artwork to "FACE TO REAL", an art series organized to raise awareness of HIV/AIDS in Japan.

Areyo Hoshikuzu, Yamada's first long-form manga series created for a general audience, was serialized in Comic Beam from 2013 to 2018. The series, which follows two veterans of the Imperial Japanese Army in the aftermath of World War II, received widespread critical acclaim, winning a Tezuka Osamu Cultural Prize and the Grand Prize at the Japan Cartoonists Association Awards.

In 2015, his manga series Nippon Night Pillow (ニッポン夜枕ばなし) began serialization in Comic Beam.

In addition to his manga work, Yamada is a kayōkyoku musician. He is the lead singer of the musical duo Tomari, with Atsuhiko Takemura. The group has released two albums through P-Vine Records: Utagoe no Minato (唄声の港; lit. "Hoarse Harbour") in 2010, and Seigetsu Shōkyoku-shū in 2014.
