= The Concierge at Hokkyoku Department Store =

Japanese manga series

- First tankōbon volume cover

北極百貨店のコンシェルジュさん (Hokkyoku Hyakkaten no Konsheruju-san)
- Genre: Comedy; Fantasy; Supernatural
- Manga
- Written by: Tsuchika Nishimura
- Published by: Shogakukan
- English publisher: NA: Seven Seas Entertainment
- Magazine: Big Comic Zōkan
- Original run: February 17, 2017 – November 16, 2018
- Volumes: 2
- Anime film

The Concierge
- Directed by: Yoshimi Itazu
- Written by: Satomi Ooshima
- Music by: Tofubeats
- Studio: Production I.G
- Licensed by: NA: Crunchyroll
- Released: October 20, 2023
- Runtime: 70 minutes
- icon

The Concierge at Hokkyoku Department Store (Japanese: 北極百貨店のコンシェルジュさん, Hepburn: Hokkyoku Hyakkaten no Konsheruju-san) is a Japanese manga series written and illustrated by Tsuchika Nishimura. It was serialized in Shogakukan's seinen manga magazine Big Comic Zōkan from February 2017 to November 2018, with its chapters collected into two tankōbon volumes. An anime film adaptation produced by Production I.G premiered in Japan in October 2023.

The series won the Excellence Award at the 25th Japan Media Arts Festival in 2022.

== Characters ==
Akino (秋乃)
Voiced by: Natsumi Kawaida
Eruru (エルル)
Voiced by: Takeo Ōtsuka
Tōdō (東堂)
Voiced by: Nobuo Tobita
Mori (森)
Voiced by: Megumi Han
Iwase (岩瀬)
Voiced by: Natsumi Fujiwara
Maruki (丸木)
Voiced by: Eiji Yoshitomi
Head Cook (給仕長, Kyūjichō)
Voiced by: Jun Fukuyama
Tokiwa (トキワ)
Voiced by: Yuichi Nakamura
Wally (ウーリー, Ūrī)
Voiced by: Kenjiro Tsuda
Laughing Owl (Husband) (ワライフクロウ夫, Warai Fukurō Otto)
Voiced by: Tatekawa Danshun
Laughing Owl (Wife) (ワライフクロウ妻, Warai Fukurō Tsuma)
Voiced by: Sumi Shimamoto
Sea Mink (Daughter) (ウミベミンク娘, Umibe Minku Musume)
Voiced by: Minako Kotobuki
Sea Mink (Father) (ウミベミンク父, Umibe Minku Chichi)
Voiced by: Hiroshi Yanaka
Male Peacock (クジャク, Kujaku)
Voiced by: Hiroki Nanami
Female Peacock (クジャク彼女, Kujaku Kanojo)
Voiced by: Maria Kano
Japanese Wolf (二ホンオオカミ, Nihon Ōkami)
Voiced by: Miyu Irino
Female Japanese Wolf (二ホンオオカミ彼女, Nihon Ōkami Kanojo)
Voiced by: Kana Hanazawa
Barbary Lion (バーバリライオン, Bābari Raion)
Voiced by: Ayumu Murase
Female Barbary Lion (バーバリライオン彼女, Bābari Raion Kanojo)
Voiced by: Emiri Suyama
Caribbean Monk Seal (カリブモンクアザラシ, Karibu Monku Azarashi)
Voiced by: Kyōko Hikami
Paradise Parrot (ゴクラクインコ, Gokurakuinko)
Voiced by: Risa Shimizu
Cat (ネコ, Neko)
Voiced by: Sumire Morohoshi

== Media ==
=== Manga ===
Written and illustrated by Tsuchika Nishimura, The Concierge at Hokkyoku Department Store was serialized in Shogakukan's Big Comic Zōkan magazine from February 17, 2017, to November 16, 2018. Two tankōbon volumes were published on November 30, 2017, and October 30, 2020.

In March 2024, Seven Seas Entertainment announced that it had licensed the series for English publication; the two volumes were released on August 13 and December 10.

==== Volumes ====
No.	Original release date	Original ISBN	English release date	English ISBN
1	November 30, 2017	978-4-09-189763-3	August 13, 2024	979-8-89160-286-1
1. "Smiling Guest" (笑うお客様, Warau Okyakusama); 2. "Beautiful Guest" (美しいお客様, Utsukushii Okyakusama); 3. "Faltering Guest" (ひるむお客様, Hirumu Okyakusama); 4. "Overboard Guest" (越えるお客様, Koeru Okyakusama); 5. "Taciturn Guest" (寡黙なお客様, Kamoku na Okyakusama)
2	October 30, 2020	978-4-09-860337-4	December 10, 2024	979-8-89160-287-8
6. "A Small Guest" (小さなお客様, Chiisana Okyakusama); 7. "Fussy Guests" (こだわるお客様, Kodawaru Okyakusama); 8. "A Serving Guest" (注ぐお客様, Sosogu Okyakusama); 9. "Fake Guests" (嘘のお客様, Uso no Okyakusama); 10. "A Misjudged Guest" (わからないお客様, Wakaranai Okyakusama)

=== Anime film ===
An anime film adaptation was announced on April 25, 2023. It is produced by Production I.G and directed by Yoshimi Itazu, with the screenplay written by Satomi Ooshima, character designs handled by Chiyo Morita, who also served as chief animation director, and music composed by Tofubeats. The film held its world premiere at the Annecy International Animation Film Festival on June 12, 2023. It was then released in Japan on October 20 of the same year by Aniplex. Myuk performed the theme song "Gift". Crunchyroll screened the film in North American theaters on September 11, 2024, under the title The Concierge.

== Reception ==
The Concierge at Hokkyoku Department Store ranked fourth in Freestyle magazine's "The Best Manga 2019 Kono Manga o Yome!" list, tying with Areyo Hoshikuzu and Sore wa Tada no Senpai no Chinko; it ranked 14th in the 2021 list. The series won the Excellence Award in the manga division of the 25th Japan Media Arts Festival in 2022.

The anime film adaptation won the Silver Audience Award for Best Animated Feature at the 27th Fantasia International Film Festival.
