= Areyo Hoshikuzu =

Japanese manga series

- Cover of the first volume, featuring Tokutarō Kawashima and Kadomatsu Kuroda

あれよ星屑
- Genre: Historical, war, slice of life
- Manga
- Written by: Sansuke Yamada
- Published by: Enterbrain
- Imprint: Beam Comix
- Magazine: Comic Beam
- Original run: September 2013 – February 2018
- Volumes: 7

Areyo Hoshikuzu (Japanese: あれよ星屑; transl. 'Alas, Stardust') is a Japanese manga series written and illustrated by Sansuke Yamada. Serialized in the manga magazine Comic Beam from September 2013 to February 2018, the series follows two veterans of the Imperial Japanese Army in the aftermath of World War II. Areyo Hoshikuzu received widespread critical acclaim, winning a Tezuka Osamu Cultural Prize and the Grand Prize at the Japan Cartoonists Association Awards.

== Synopsis ==
Described by publisher Kadokawa Shoten as a "bromance in the ruins of Tokyo", Areyo Hoshikuzu is set in 1946, a year after Japan's defeat in the Second World War. Tokutarō Kawashima, a demobilized Japanese sergeant and veteran of the Second Sino-Japanese War, reunites with Kadomatsu Kuroda, a private first class who served in his squad. The series follows the two men as they navigate life in occupied Tokyo, including their encounters with the black market, "pan pan girls", and the Recreation and Amusement Association.

== Production ==
As a student, series creator Sansuke Yamada fostered an interest in the post-war period and the history of occupied Japan through the works of Miyoko Matsutani, Akiyuki Nosaka, and Komimasa Tanaka. He was motivated to create Areyo Hoshikuzu after noting that while there are multiple popular manga series set in the later stages of the Japanese economic miracle, such as Chibi Maruko-chan and Sunset on Third Street, comparably fewer series have been set in the immediate aftermath of the war. In developing Areyo Hoshikuzu, Yamada sought to maintain a high level of historical accuracy, and researched period-specific military uniforms and equipment, drew landscapes based on historical news photography, and interviewed officers of the Japan Self-Defense Forces to confirm troop numbers and locations during the war.

Areyo Hoshikuzu is Yamada's first longform manga series for a general audience, following a career in which he was best known as a creator of gay manga. While the series is not a gay or boys' love (BL) manga, Yamada has stated that audiences "can read it as BL" given its narrative focus on close bonds between men. Certain stylistic hallmarks of Yamada's gay manga artwork appear in Areyo Hoshikuzu, notably the hirsute and bear-like appearance of its lead characters.

== Media ==
Areyo Hoshikuzu was serialized in the manga magazine Comic Beam from September 2013 to February 2018. The series has been collected into seven tankōbon (bound volumes) published by Kadokawa Shoten:

No.	Release date	ISBN
1	April 25, 2014	978-4047295919
2	October 25, 2014	978-4047299696
3	June 25, 2015	978-4047305366
4	December 25, 2015	978-4047308367
5	August 25, 2016	978-4047342514
6	March 25, 2017	978-4047345362
7	February 10, 2018	978-4047350465

Internationally, the series is published in French by Belgium-based publisher Casterman under the title Sengo.

== Reception ==
Areyo Hoshikuzu has received widespread critical acclaim. The series was praised by HuffPost for its balancing of comedic and serious subject material, and commended its non-negationist treatment of war crimes committed by the Empire of Japan. In 2015, Takarajimasha's Kono Manga ga Sugoi! ranked the series as the fifth best manga for male readers based on its survey of manga and publishing professionals, and Freestyle's The Best Manga 2015 ranked it as the third best manga of the year.

In 2019, Areyo Hoshikuzu won the Tezuka Osamu Cultural Prize in the New Creator category, and the Grand Prize at the Japan Cartoonists Association Awards.
