= Michelle Manning =

American film director

- Occupation(s): Executive Producer, television director, and producer.
- Years active: 1983–present

Michelle Manning is an American film director, television director, and producer best known for producing Sixteen Candles and The Breakfast Club. She served as the President of Production for Paramount Pictures from 1997 to 2005. In 2017, she became an executive producer on the Disney Channel series Andi Mack along with several Disney Channel original films, such as Adventures in Babysitting and Maleficient.

== Career ==
She began her career with Zoetrope Studios, where she was production supervisor of Francis Ford Coppola’s The Outsiders and Rumble Fish. Manning worked as an executive for Ned Tanen’s Channel Productions, where she produced The Breakfast Club and was associate producer of Sixteen Candles. Manning made her feature directorial debut in 1986 with Blue City for producers Walter Hill and William Hayward as well as musical sequences for Hill's Another 48 Hrs. In television, Manning directed episodes of Miami Vice and Paramount's Friday the 13th: The Series.

Manning was Vice President of Production at Orion Pictures in the early 1990s, where she served as a production executive on Academy Award-winning Best Pictures The Silence of the Lambs and Dances with Wolves as well as Little Man Tate, and The Addams Family, which was then distributed by Paramount.

In 1991, Manning began working for Paramount Pictures as Senior Vice President of Production. In 1994 she was promoted to Executive Vice President of Production and was promoted again in 1997 to President of Production replacing John Goldwyn. As President, she oversaw all aspects of the studio's film development and production in addition to supervising the group's production executives. During her time at Paramount, she was involved in over 20 Paramount classic films such as Forrest Gump which won six Academy Awards including Best Picture; The Hours, which was nominated for nine Oscars; as well as Titanic, The Firm, Nobody’s Fool, Clueless, The Talented Mr. Ripley, Braveheart, and Saving Private Ryan, among many others.

After leaving Paramount Pictures, Manning launched the production company MM Productions in 2005. Manning went on to produce Cruise/Wagner Productions' The Eye starring Jessica Alba and Chloë Grace Moretz, and Mary Agnes Donoghue’s Jenny's Wedding, starring Katherine Heigl and Tom Wilkinson. She also executive produced Prosecuting Casey Anthony starring Rob Lowe for Lifetime, as well as both Teen Beach 2 and Adventures In Babysitting for the Disney Channel.

From 2017 to 2019, Manning was an Executive Producer on the groundbreaking Disney Channel series Andi Mack. The show was produced by her production company, MM Productions. Manning directed eight episodes between its second and third seasons. It was the Disney Channel’s first serialized show, its first series centered around an Asian-American family, and its first to feature an LGBTQ character who spoke the words "I'm gay." Andi Mack was nominated for a Peabody Award and won both the inaugural GLAAD Media Award for Outstanding Kids & Family Programming and the Television Academy Honor which recognizes programming that educates and enlightens audiences.

In 2019, Manning executive produced Netflix’s The Dirt as well as Come Away, starring Angelina Jolie and David Oyelowo.

== Personal life ==
Manning attended USC Film School.
