= John Eskow =

American screenwriter

- Born: November 11, 1949 (age 76); Utica, New York, U.S.
- Occupations: Screenwriter, Musician, Journalist

John Eskow (born November 11, 1949) is an American screenwriter.

== Filmography ==
- Pink Cadillac (1989)
- Air America (1990)
- The Mask of Zorro (1998)

Novel: Smokestack Lightning, Delacorte, 1981.
