= Jenny's Wedding =

- Theatrical release poster
- Directed by: Mary Agnes Donoghue
- Written by: Mary Agnes Donoghue
- Produced by: Mary Agnes Donoghue; Gail Levin; Michelle Manning
- Starring: Katherine Heigl; Tom Wilkinson; Linda Emond; Grace Gummer; Alexis Bledel; Sam McMurray; Diana Hardcastle
- Cinematography: Seamus Tierney
- Edited by: Éva Gárdos; Nick Moore
- Music by: Brian Byrne
- Production companies: MM Productions; Merced Media Partners; PalmStar Entertainment
- Distributed by: IFC Films
- Release date: July 31, 2015 (United States)
- Country: United States

Jenny's Wedding is a 2015 American romantic comedy-drama film written and directed by Mary Agnes Donoghue and starring Katherine Heigl, Alexis Bledel, Tom Wilkinson, Linda Emond, Grace Gummer and Matthew Metzger. Heigl plays Jenny, a woman who finally decides to get married, but her choice of partner tears her conventional family apart. Jenny's Wedding was filmed on location in Cleveland from October 2013. An Indiegogo campaign was later launched to help raise money for post-production costs. The film was released on July 31, 2015, in a limited release by IFC Films.

== Plot ==
Jenny is the middle daughter of a conservative Catholic family in Cleveland, Ohio. She is a closeted lesbian who tells her family that her partner of five years, Kitty, is her roommate. Her parents, Eddie and Rose, have always dreamed of the day their middle daughter will get married and are always reminding her about her biological clock and trying to fix her up with men. Jenny realizes that she does want to get married and have a family, and proposes to Kitty. She decides to come out to her family and her parents are taken aback that she is not only gay, but engaged to a woman. Jenny has the support of her older brother, Michael, who says he suspected she was gay since high school. Her younger sister Anne always felt that Jenny was their mother's favorite and is not so much upset that Jenny is a lesbian as that she lied to her all those years. They reconcile when Jenny asks her to be her maid of honor. Jenny's parents want her to stay closeted in front of their friends but she refuses, causing a big fight with her father. Her parents at first refuse to go to the wedding, but eventually her mother realizes that Jenny is the same daughter she's always been proud of and agrees to go. Jenny's father has a talk with his best friend the day of the wedding and finally also agrees to go, and both parents walk her down the aisle. Over the closing credits a picture is shown of the whole family, including Jenny and Kitty with their new baby.

== Cast ==
- Katherine Heigl as Jennifer "Jenny" Farrell, Eddie and Rose's daughter, Michael and Anne's sister, Kitty's fiancée
- Alexis Bledel as Kitty Friedman, Jennifer's fiancée
- Tom Wilkinson as Eddie Farrell, Michael, Anne and Jennifer's father and Rose's husband
- Linda Emond as Rose Farrell, Michael, Anne and Jennifer's mother and Eddie's wife
- Grace Gummer as Anne Farrell, Michael and Jennifer's sister, Frankie's wife, Eddie and Rose's daughter
- Matthew Metzger as Michael Farrell, Anne and Jennifer's brother, Eddie and Rose's son and Lorraine's husband
- Houston Rhines as Frankie, Anne's husband
- Cathleen O'Malley as Lorraine Farrell, Michael's wife
- Sam McMurray as Denny O'Leary, Ellen's husband
- Diana Hardcastle as Ellen O'Leary, Denny's wife

== Production ==
=== Conception and development ===
Jenny's Wedding was written and directed by Mary Agnes Donoghue. She also produced the film, along with Gail Levin and MM Productions' Michelle Manning. The rights to the film were put up for sale at the American Film Market from November 6, 2013.

=== Filming ===
Principal photography on Jenny's Wedding commenced on October 28, 2013, in Greater Cleveland. The film was expected to shoot in the metropolitan area for three to four weeks. Filming locations included University Heights City Hall and Cuyahoga County Councilman Julian Rogers's home in Cleveland Heights. Rogers and his family moved out on October 23 and the studio paid for a rental in Shaker Heights. Representatives from the studio had noticed the house and asked Rogers "out of the blue" if they could use it for filming. The family returned home in November. On November 15, Heigl was seen shooting some scenes for the film on Euclid Avenue in Downtown Cleveland inside the 5th Street Arcades. Some filming was done at the Trinity Cathedral. Production wrapped in Cleveland during the same month.

=== Post-production ===
An Indiegogo campaign was set up to aid in post-production with Donoghue and her crew asking $150,000 to cover the costs of music, titles, color and sound. Lucas Shaw from The Wrap thought that some of the money raised would go towards taking the film to festivals, as, at the time, it had yet to secure a domestic distributor. The campaign ended on April 12, 2014, having raised $96,691.

== Release ==
The film had its world premiere at the Outfest Los Angeles Film Festival on July 10, 2015. IFC Films acquired distribution rights to the film and released it on July 31, 2015, in the United States in a limited release and through video on demand a day later on August 1, 2015.

== Reception ==
Jenny's Wedding received mainly negative reviews from critics. Review aggregation website Rotten Tomatoes gives the film a 20% rating based on reviews from 15 critics, with an average rating of 4.02/10.

Jeannette Catsoulis of The New York Times noted that, "One of the many irritants in this trite, well-intentioned lecture on tolerance: The audience is always several moves ahead of the script."

The Hungarian National Media- and News Authority (Nemzeti Média és Hírközlési Hatóság) in 2021 had declared Jenny's Wedding unfit for consumption by children, invoking the "Protection of Children act"", limiting viewership to only those above eighteen years of age."
