= Air America (book) =

1979 non-fiction book by Christopher Robbins

- Author: Christopher Robbins
- Publisher: Putnam
- Publication date: 1978

Air America is a 1978 non-fiction book by journalist Christopher Robbins. The book is a history of Air America, an airline covertly owned by the United States Central Intelligence Agency from 1950 to 1976.

== Background ==
From the 1950s to the early 1970s, Indochina had been the landscape of major drug and military operations, conducted by many actors including European and communist countries. When US military involvement started, costs rose and new resources, especially for covert operations, were needed.

== Anything, Anywhere, Anytime ==
Air America's pilots flew dangerous missions, those no one else would fly, frequently under enemy fire. Many missions were in fact aid-oriented missions to provide logistical support and food to allies who were fighting the war along with the South Vietnamese and the US. Most of the time, pilots did not know what they were delivering, just when and where, no matter what the weather was like, or whether it was day or night.

== Adaptation into film ==
- Air America, directed by Roger Spottiswoode in 1990, with Mel Gibson and Robert Downey Jr.
