= Blue City (film) =

1986 film by Michelle Manning

- Theatrical release poster
- Directed by: Michelle Manning
- Written by: Lukas Heller; Walter Hill
- Based on: Blue City by Ross Macdonald
- Produced by: William Hayward; Walter Hill
- Starring: Judd Nelson; Ally Sheedy
- Cinematography: Steven Poster
- Edited by: Ross Albert
- Music by: Ry Cooder
- Distributed by: Paramount Pictures
- Release date: May 2, 1986
- Running time: 83 minutes
- Country: United States
- Language: English
- Budget: $10 million
- Box office: $6.9 million

Blue City is a 1986 American action thriller film directed by Michelle Manning and starring Judd Nelson, Ally Sheedy and David Caruso. It is based on Ross Macdonald's 1947 novel of the same name about a young man who returns to a corrupt small town in Florida to avenge the death of his father.

== Plot ==
A young man, Billy Turner, returns to his hometown of Blue City, Florida, after five years away. He gets into a bar fight and is thrown in jail. Then, he learns that his father Jim, the town's mayor, was killed while he was gone. The chief of police, Luther Reynolds, tells Billy that the police did not find the killer but that Perry Kerch, Jim's widow Malvina's business partner, was a suspect. Billy decides to start his own investigation. He meets with his old friend, Joey Rayford, who refuses to help him. Billy then meets with Kerch. Kerch says that he did not kill Jim and then has his thugs beat up Billy. Billy talks to Joey again, and Joey agrees to help him take down Kerch. Billy blows up Kerch's car and robs Kerch's thugs of money. Joey's sister, Annie, does not approve of what Billy and Joey are doing, but they refuse to stop. Billy gives Annie a ride home, and they have sex. Afterwards, they start a relationship with each other. Annie, who works at the police station, starts to help Billy with investigating Jim's murder. Billy and Joey go to a club that Kerch owns, beat up the workers, and wreck the club. Kerch and Reynolds both continue trying to get Billy to leave town, without success. Billy, Joey, and Annie get lured to a motel. Kerch's thugs arrive, a gunfight ensues, and Kerch's thugs are killed. Reynolds forces Billy to leave. After he leaves, he learns that Joey was shot and killed. Billy returns and goes to confront Kerch at Kerch's house. Reynolds shows up, as well, and kills Kerch and his thugs. Then, Reynolds shoots Billy and reveals that he killed Jim. Billy fights and kills Reynolds. The police arrive, everything is sorted out, and Billy and Annie leave town on Billy's motorcycle.

== Cast ==
- Judd Nelson as Billy Turner
- Ally Sheedy as Annie Rayford
- David Caruso as Joey Rayford
- Paul Winfield as Luther Reynolds
- Scott Wilson as Perry Kerch
- Anita Morris as Malvina Kerch
- Julie Carmen as Debbie Torres
- Luis Contreras as Lieutenant Ortiz

In addition, The Textones (Carla Olson, Joe Read, George Callins, Phil Seymour and Tom Morgan Jr.) appear in the film, performing their song "You Can Run".

== Production ==
=== Development ===
The novel by Ross Macdonald was originally published in 1947. It was compared to the work of Dashiell Hammett, in particular Red Harvest. Walter Hill wrote the script with Lukas Heller and was originally intended to star a leading man in his mid-30s but by the mid-1980s, a number of popular young male actors had emerged, so the script was rewritten to accommodate one of them. The lead in the original novel, John Weather, was a man in his early 20s, although a war veteran.

Hill handed over directing duties to first-timer Michelle Manning. She previously worked with Ally Sheedy and Judd Nelson on The Breakfast Club as a producer. Her The Breakfast Club co-producer was Ned Tanen and when he took over as head of production at Paramount, the studio agreed to finance Blue City with Manning's direction.

"I don't think I'll become Samantha Peckinpah", said Manning, "but I don't think as a woman that I should have to make a movie with girls in locker rooms putting on make up." Manning did admit being a woman director meant "You're under a microscope. You suddenly become a media event for no good reason."

=== Casting ===
This was the first film Nelson made since St. Elmo's Fire. He had taken a year off to appear in several plays. "It's the first part ever that I didn't have to audition for", he said. "Instead of having to make the rounds and go to casting calls and auditioning with hundreds of other guys, suddenly my agent has more offers coming in than I can possibly handle. I'm in a position where I can actually turn a job down. It's a strange experience."

Nelson reflected on his role:

Cowboys and Indians, cops and robbers. That's the way Billy Turner sees it--it's good guys and bad guys. He's the misunderstood hero now. What, is he out of his mind? He doesn't even know what`s going on. Billy Turner is supposedly on a quest to find out who killed his father, but as soon as he gets a gun in his hand, it's like: 'Hey--I've got a gun in my hand!' It's a little like real life--sometimes you don't know what you're supposed to be doing, even when you're doing it.

"I think it's very exciting that a woman would direct a film of the Peckinpah mode rather the sweet, postman- falls-in-love-with-the-divorcee mode", said Nelson. "I think it could have been filmed in black and white with a blue tint. I think that would have been the coolest."

David Caruso had made a number of films for Paramount – An Officer and a Gentleman, Thief of Hearts – and said they specifically crafted his role for him.

=== Filming ===
Principal photography started in February 1985. The film was made at the height of the popularity of the Brat Pack. Manning said of them:

These actors function on three levels. As professionals, they're totally devoted, totally relentless, totally driven. In the public social scene, like at the Hard Rock Cafe, they have to deal with people coming up to them, asking for autographs, pulling on their clothes. And in the privacy of their homes, they're completely relaxed, and they're just kids. But they all want so much to grow as actors. They all so much want their careers to grow. And it scares them all, the idea that tomorrow this could all end. I mean, it could all just be over. They want so much to be doing the same thing when they're forty, and who's to say? Will the trend then be to make movies with forty-year-olds?

Preview audiences disliked the movie's ending so it was reshot.

=== Props ===
The motorcycle used is apparently the same 1978/9 750cc Triumph Bonneville T140E used by Richard Gere in An Officer and a Gentleman (1982) in which David Caruso also appeared.

== Release ==
=== Box office ===
Blue City earned $6,947,787 at the box office.

=== Critical reception ===
The film received negative reviews from critics.

Nelson's performance was particularly criticized, with USA Today saying "Is Judd Nelson the smirkiest actor in current movies, or is he simply getting stereotyped playing overbearing creeps? Either way, you spend Blue City's 83 interminable minutes begging to deck him." Los Angeles Daily News: "You haven't seen anything quite so ridiculous as a limp-jawed, dewy-eyed Nelson trying to carry off a tough guy part." San Francisco Chronicle: "It's another step in the slow process of revealing, movie by movie, what dull actors some of the celebrated Brat Pack kids are. Judd Nelson would make a great shopping cart, Sheedy a still life of a cornflower gone to wilt." The New York Times: "(The main character has) a passion as rootless as an Everglades air plant. . . . Though his clothes suggest that he and Don Johnson patronize the same boutique, Mr. Nelson has the looks of someone who's come South on a spring break and overshot Fort Lauderdale." Daily Variety: "Blue City is fictionally set in Florida, but was lensed entirely in California, thus managing to shame the citizenry on one coast and the film making industry on the other, all at the same time."

The Los Angeles Times wrote:

How many ways can a movie go wrong? You will never really know until you see Blue City. The packaging fools you. How could you guess that a Ross MacDonald novel, scripted by action pros Walter Hill and Lukas Heller, would come out sounding addle-brained? Or that Judd Nelson and Ally Sheedy--of The Breakfast Club--could exhibit subzero chemistry? Or that sun-drenched Florida (re-created in San Pedro) could be so flat and homely? The action so preposterous? The sex so dull? The wisecracks so witless? If this movie were a vaudeville act, you'd be yelling "Give 'em the hook!" after 15 minutes. Maybe that's Blue City's problem: too many hooks. It's a high-concept "Young '80s" reworking of MacDonald's 1947 Hammett-style thriller--with no Lew Archer, no metaphor and no edge.

On the review aggregator website Rotten Tomatoes, 0% of 5 critics' reviews are positive.

=== Awards ===
It was nominated for five Golden Raspberry Awards at the 7th Golden Raspberry Awards, but won none:

- Worst Actor (Judd Nelson) (lost to Prince in Under the Cherry Moon)
- Worst Actress (Ally Sheedy) (lost to Madonna in Shanghai Surprise)
- Worst Supporting Actor (Scott Wilson) (lost to Jerome Benton in Under the Cherry Moon)
- Worst Director (Michelle Manning) (lost to Prince for Under the Cherry Moon)
- Worst Picture (lost in a tie to Howard the Duck and Under the Cherry Moon)

=== Legacy ===
Sheedy later said she "didn't particularly like" the film:

Michelle Manning and I had been close friends. And she was so excited about the chance to direct that my feeling was it would be really great to work with someone I really liked and help contribute to their first big project. I was very naïve, I guess, because I kept hoping it would turn out OK, that somehow all the stuff that was missing would miraculously appear when they edited it all together. I guess that's not the way it works, so I was disappointed.

Tanen's associate at Paramount, Dawn Steel, later said, "I suspect Michelle took her shot at directing too early. I think the experience for Michelle was unbelievably difficult. She may not necessarily have had the experience she needed. She didn't have the production support we thought we'd be able to supply her with. She was out there pretty much by herself. That's really tough your first time out. I think Michelle will turn out to have enormous amounts of talent. She kills herself. I never saw anyone work harder, ever. She's very smart. I think she'll be one of the few who gets a second chance. I don't think a first-time male director would have had much more luck than Michelle, given all those things. It had nothing to do with her being a woman."

After hearing Steel's comments, Manning said: "I think that's fair. I was out there pretty much on my own. In retrospect, I do think the critics were more tough on me than they had to be. I'm not a war criminal. I don't think many directors' first films are perfect. Maybe the timing wasn't right. There was a lot of 'brat-pack' backlash."

Manning had a production deal at Paramount as a producer and was developing projects elsewhere as a director. However, she never directed another film.
