= Stanley Anderson =

American character actor (1939–2018)

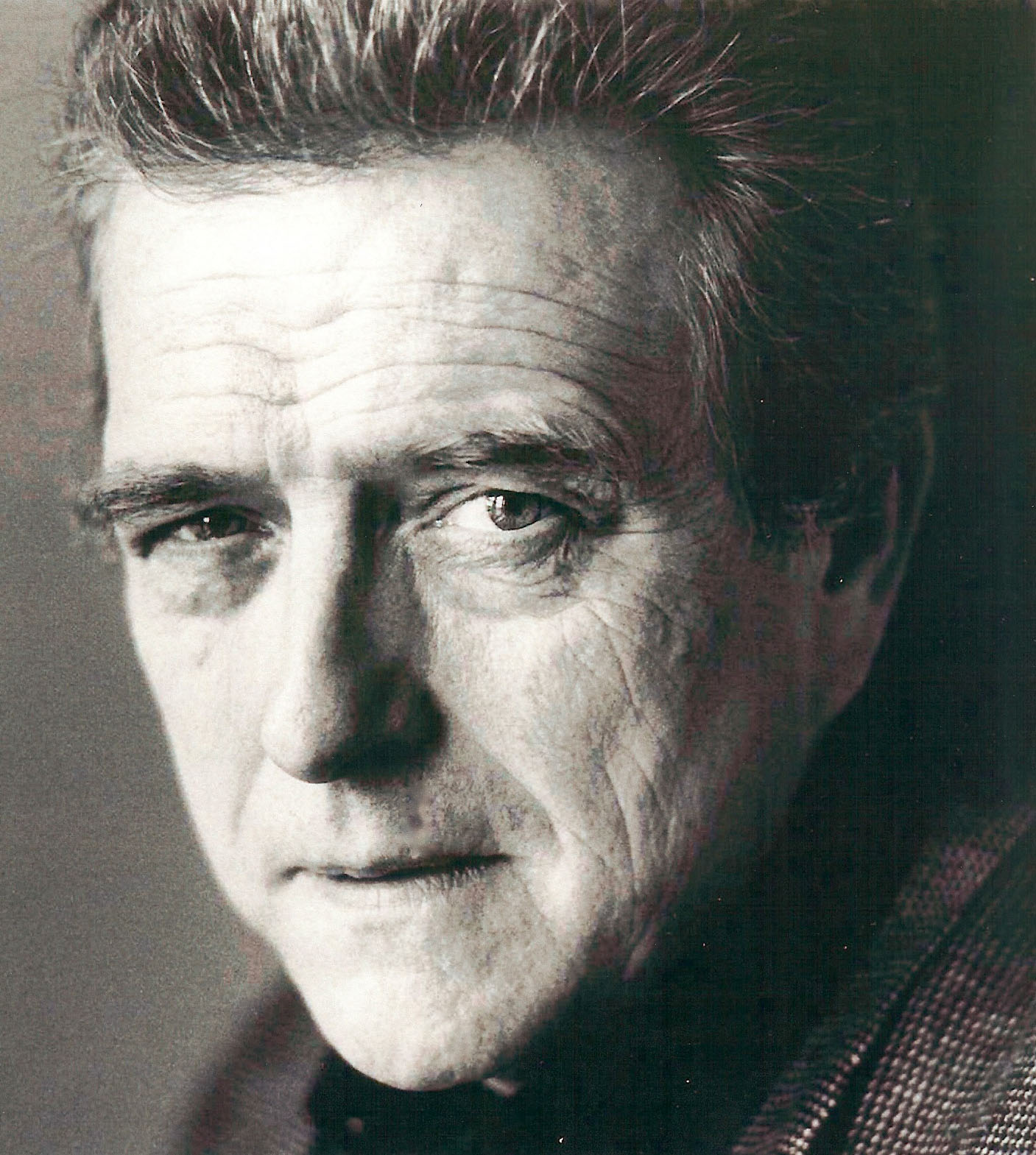
- Stanley Anderson in 2007
- Born: October 23, 1939; Billings, Montana, U.S.
- Died: June 24, 2018 (aged 78); Santa Rosa, California, U.S.
- Education: San Jose State University
- Occupation: Actor
- Years active: 1964–2007

Stanley Anderson (October 23, 1939 – June 24, 2018) was an American character actor who played Drew Carey's father on The Drew Carey Show.

== Early life ==
Born in Billings, Montana, Anderson attended Garfield Elementary School, Lincoln Junior High School, and Billings Senior High School. He graduated from San Jose State University in the 1960s with a master's degree in theatre.

He had two years of military service in Korea, where he served in a broadcasting post that he compared to the film Good Morning, Vietnam. Between returning from Korea and becoming an actor, he worked with display advertising in California.

== Career ==
Anderson began his professional acting career in 1967. Prior to 1990, and his work in film and television, Anderson had spent 23 years in over 200 productions as a professional actor working at Arena Stage, ACT, The Actors Company, and the California Shakespeare Festival, among others.

After undergraduate and graduate work at San Jose State University, where he appeared in 16 productions, he and his wife, actress Judith Long, moved to Seattle, Washington, where they spent three years at the Seattle Repertory Theatre. After two years at Actors Theatre in Louisville, Kentucky, Anderson headed to Washington, D.C., to join the Arena Stage. His debut with Arena Stage was in the starring role of Randle McMurphy in One Flew Over the Cuckoo's Nest. Anderson went on to spend 17 years with Arena Stage, appearing in nearly 100 of their productions. During the years he was active in Arena Stage, Anderson lived with his wife and their son in Springfield, Virginia. In the mid-2000s they moved to the Los Angeles area of California.

In the early 1970s, Anderson was a member of the board of directors of Actors Company of Ann Arbor, Michigan, in addition to acting with the group.

Anderson's films include Deceived, RoboCop 3 and The Pelican Brief. He appeared in Michael Bay's movies The Rock and Armageddon; in both films, he played the role of the US president. His TV guest appearances include The Practice, The X-Files, and "Judge Vandelay" in the Seinfeld episode "The Finale". Anderson also worked as voiceover talent for National Geographic, Discovery Channel, The Learning Channel, PBS, and the History Channel documentaries.

== Death ==
Anderson died of brain cancer on June 24, 2018, at the age of 78.

== Filmography ==
- 1986 The Imagemaker as Tony LaCorte (voice)
- 1991 Son of the Morning Star as Ulysses S. Grant
- 1991 He Said, She Said as Bill Weller
- 1991 Deceived as Detective Kinsella
- 1991-1993 L.A. Law (2 episodes) as Dr. Carlson
- 1993 RoboCop 3 as Zack
- 1993 The Pelican Brief as Edwin Sneller
- 1994 Murder Between Friends as Casey
- 1995 Canadian Bacon as Edwin S. Simon, NBS News Anchor
- 1996 City Hall as Train Conductor
- 1996 Primal Fear as Archbishop Richard Rushman
- 1996 The Rock as The President (uncredited)
- 1997 Shadow Conspiracy as Attorney General Toyanbee
- 1997 The Shining (mini TV Series) as Delbert Grady
- 1998 Seinfeld as Judge Vandelay
- 1998 Armageddon as The President
- 1999 Chicago Hope (1 episode) as Dr. Windsor
- 1999 Arlington Road as Dr. Archer Scobee
- 1999 Just Shoot Me! (1 episode) as Minister
- 1999 Judging Amy (1 episode) as Thomas Carr
- 2000 Waking the Dead as Fielding's Father
- 2000 The X-Files (1 episode) as Agent Schoniger
- 2000 The Kid as Bob Riley
- 2000 Proof of Life as Jerry
- 2001 Ally McBeal (1 episode) as Judge Walter McDonald
- 2001 Crossing Jordan (1 episode) as Pat Donnelly
- 2001 Roswell (1 episode) as Jim Valenti Sr.
- 2002 40 Days and 40 Nights as Father Maher
- 2002 Spider-Man as General Slocum
- 2002 S1m0ne as Frank Brand
- 2002 Red Dragon as Jimmy Price
- 1991-2003 Law & Order (2 episodes) as Jerry Manley / Nelson Lambert
- 2003 Legally Blonde 2: Red, White & Blonde as Michael Blaine
- 2003 Runaway Jury as Henry Jankle
- 2002-2003 American Dreams (2 episodes) as Father Ryan
- 1997-2004 The Practice (3 episodes) as Dr. Gale / Psychiatrist
- 1995-2004 The Drew Carey Show (10 episodes) as George Carey
- 2004 The Last Shot as Howard Schatz / Ben Cartwright
- 1994-2005 NYPD Blue (2 episodes) as Robert Heilbrenner / Professor John Goldman (final appearance)

=== Self ===
- 1990 When the Earth Quakes (TV) as The Narrator
- Richard I: The Lion Heart (1994)
- 1996 Ancient Mysteries (TV Series) as The Narrator (Origin of the Vampire) (unknown episodes)
  - ... aka Ancient Mysteries: New Investigations of the Unsolved (USA: video title)
