= Deceived =

1991 film directed by Damian Harris

- Theatrical release poster
- Directed by: Damian Harris
- Written by: Mary Agnes Donoghue; Derek Saunders
- Produced by: Ellen Collett; Wendy Dozoretz; Michael Finnell
- Starring: Goldie Hawn; John Heard
- Cinematography: Jack N. Green
- Edited by: Neil Travis
- Music by: Thomas Newman
- Production companies: Touchstone Pictures; Aysgarth Productions
- Distributed by: Buena Vista Pictures Distribution
- Release date: September 27, 1991
- Running time: 108 minutes
- Country: United States
- Language: English
- Box office: $28.7 million

Deceived is a 1991 American psychological thriller film directed by Damian Harris. The script was written by Mary Agnes Donoghue and rewritten by Bruce Joel Rubin. Goldie Hawn and John Heard star as a happily married couple whose lives are disrupted when secrets from the past are revealed. The film also marks the final screen appearance of veteran actress Beatrice Straight, who plays Adrienne's mother.

== Plot ==
Adrienne Saunders is happily married to art dealer Jack. They have a daughter named Mary. After the local museum curator is mysteriously murdered, Jack falls under suspicion of selling forged treasures to the museum. He has to suddenly go to Boston on a work-related trip, but Adrienne hears from a friend that she thought she saw Jack in town. Adrienne confronts him, but he denies being in town. As pressure mounts on Jack over a forged relic, Adrienne receives word from the police that he died in a car accident. In trying to wrap up his affairs, Adrienne begins to suspect that her husband was not who he claimed to be. When she sees a high school yearbook picture of her husband attributed to a man named Frank Sullivan, she realizes that she has been deceived.

She tracks down Jack's cousin, Evelyn, who confirms that Frank and Jack were inseparable in high school. After Jack died, she never saw Frank again. Evelyn explains that Frank's father was an alcoholic and that his mother worked as a toll booth operator. She directs Adrienne to Frank's mother Rosalie Sullivan, who lives in a rundown Brooklyn apartment. Rosalie bitterly receives the news of her granddaughter, telling Adrienne that Frank was always selfish and never looked in on her.

A stalker lurks at Adrienne's loft. One day, as the housekeeper finishes her chores, she surprises him. He leaves her almost dead in the bathroom and ransacks the apartment.

At work, Adrienne gets an urgent message from Mrs. Sullivan and rushes to her apartment. When she arrives, the door is open, and Mrs. Sullivan is nowhere to be found. "Frank" appears, and Adrienne slaps him for his cruelty. Frank explains that when his friend Jack died, he was distraught and fell into Jack's identity during the mourning process. He reveals that a man named Dan Sherman is blackmailing him. Frank faked his death to escape, knowing that he would have to give up his life with Adrienne and Mary. He tells her that Sherman is insistent on having an Egyptian necklace that is located in their apartment, and he asks Adrienne to look for it. As she leaves the apartment, Frank watches her from the window beside the body of his murdered mother.

During her search for the necklace, Adrienne discovers a Parks Department photo ID. It bears her husband's picture and the name Daniel Sherman. She tracks down an address and pays a surprise visit to the house. A pregnant Mrs. Sherman is on the phone and lets her in, thinking she is with a moving company. In the house, Adrienne sees wedding pictures of her husband with Mrs. Sherman. In a photo album, she sees a picture of Mary, who Mrs. Sherman says is her husband's dead sister. The person on the phone is Frank, who asks her to give the phone to Adrienne. He congratulates her on tracking down his new life and reveals that he has kidnapped Mary. Mary traded the necklace to another girl, and Frank instructs Adrienne to retrieve it and meet him at their loft to exchange Mary for the necklace. At the loft, Adrienne stabs him and flees. After a long chase throughout a construction area, Frank corners her in the freight elevator. Adrienne lures Frank into the elevator shaft, where he falls to his death. Later, Adrienne and Mary pack up to move out of the loft and start a new life somewhere else.

== Cast ==
- Goldie Hawn as Adrienne Saunders
- John Heard as Frank Sullivan / Jack Saunders / Dan Sherman
- Robin Bartlett as Charlotte, Adrienne's Business Partner
- Ashley Peldon as Mary Saunders
- Beatrice Straight as Adrienne's Mother
- George R. Robertson as Adrienne's Father
- Tom Irwin as Harvey Schwartz
- Jan Rubeš as Tomasz
- Anais Granofsky as Ellen
- Heidi Von Palleske as Mrs. Peabody
- Stanley Anderson as Detective Kinsella
- Francesca Buller as Lillian
- Bruce MacVittie as Social Security Man
- Amy Wright as Evelyn Saunders
- Kate Reid as Rosalie Sullivan
- Laura Hawn as Evelyn Saunders' Mother

== Production ==
Filming took place primarily in Toronto, with some exterior locations in New York City, from January 22 until April 16, 1991. Mary Agnes Donoghue wrote the initial screenplay. Donoghue was inspired by the thought of having a safe, middle-class life turn out to be a complete lie. When Donoghue declined to make changes to the script, Bruce Joel Rubin was hired, under the pen name "Derek Saunders".

== Box office ==
The film opened at number 3 in the US and grossed $4.3 million in its first week. Its final gross in the US was $28.7 million.

== Reception ==
Deceived gained a 38% approval rating on Rotten Tomatoes based on 21 reviews; the average rating is 5/10. Reviewers criticized the film for its illogical and predictable plot. Roger Ebert wrote, "Deceived opens with an ancient thriller formula, elevates itself to passages of genuine suspense, and then ends with a climax so absurd that it takes a real effort of memory to recall that parts of the movie were really pretty good."

Audiences polled by CinemaScore gave the film an average grade of "A-" on an A+ to F scale.

=== Home media ===
Deceived was released on VHS on April 1, 1992, by Touchstone Home Video. It proved successful in the video rental market, becoming the 9th most-rented film in the United States for 1992.
