= Air America (film) =

1990 film by Roger Spottiswoode

- Theatrical release poster
- Directed by: Roger Spottiswoode
- Screenplay by: John Eskow; Richard Rush
- Based on: Air America by Christopher Robbins
- Produced by: Daniel Melnick; Mario Kassar
- Starring: Mel Gibson; Robert Downey Jr.; Nancy Travis; David Marshall Grant; Lane Smith
- Cinematography: Roger Deakins
- Edited by: John Bloom; Lois Freeman-Fox
- Music by: Charles Gross
- Production company: Carolco Pictures
- Distributed by: Tri-Star Pictures
- Release date: August 10, 1990
- Running time: 113 minutes
- Country: United States
- Language: English
- Budget: $30–35 million
- Box office: $57.7 million

Air America is a 1990 American action comedy film directed by Roger Spottiswoode and starring Mel Gibson and Robert Downey Jr. as Air America pilots flying missions in Laos during the Vietnam War. When the protagonists discover their aircraft is being used by CIA agents to smuggle heroin, they must avoid being framed as the drug-smugglers.

The plot of the film is adapted from Christopher Robbins' 1979 non-fiction book, chronicling the CIA-financed airline to transport weapons and supplies in Cambodia, Laos and South Vietnam during the Vietnam War.

The publicity for the film, advertised as a lighthearted buddy movie, implied a tone that differs greatly from the actual film, which includes such serious themes as an anti-war message, focus on the opium trade, and a negative portrayal of Royal Laotian General Vang Pao (played by actor Burt Kwouk as "General Lu Soong").

== Plot ==
In late 1969, helicopter pilot Billy Covington has his pilot's license suspended for breaking safety regulations. His skills, bravery and disregard for the law are noticed by a government agent, who offers him a job in Laos working for the "strictly civilian" company Air America. In Laos, he is introduced to Air America's unorthodox pilots and aircraft, which is actually a front for CIA operations. He's taken under the wing of pilot Gene Ryack, whose official flights are a cover for buying black market weapons for his private cache. Senator Davenport arrives from the United States to investigate rumors that Air America is transporting drugs for Laotian forces. He makes a bad first impression on General Soong by mistaking him for a valet at the airport. Major Lemond and Rob Diehl, CIA leaders of Air America, guide the Senator around Laos to prevent him discovering that the rumors are true.

Billy and Jack Neely are shot at while airdropping livestock in a C-123 cargo aircraft, and crash-land at an abandoned World War II Japanese airstrip. General Soong's PC-6 lands and his soldiers transfer opium from the crashed plane, and abandon Billy and Jack when local Communist forces move in. They are rescued by Gene and another pilot, but Gene's helicopter is shot down. Billy and Gene are captured by a tribe. Gene strikes a deal to supply them with better weapons. They return to Gene's house, where Billy discovers Gene has a wife and children. Gene coaxes Billy to quit flying for Air America but Billy wants to get even with General Soong.

Senator Davenport demands to know who is facilitating the heroin trade. Lemond and Diehl blame Jack, who has been killed, but they fail to satisfy Davenport who keeps investigating. Gene finds a buyer for his arsenal, allowing him to quit Air America and take his family out of Laos. Billy flies one more mission, taking flour to a refugee camp, and is instructed to divert for "routine inspection." Suspecting a setup, Billy inspects the cargo and finds heroin. He crash-lands on the Japanese airstrip and hides the aircraft in the wreckage of the previous crash. Davenport recognizes the nature of the setup and threatens to reveal Lemond and Diehl's operation to Washington. Major Lemond threatens in turn to ruin Davenport's political career with innuendo about his connections.

Gene, making his final weapons delivery, diverts and rescues Billy. They respond to a distress call from a refugee camp caught in crossfire. The official in charge of the camp refuses to leave without the refugees. Billy pressures Gene into reluctantly dumping the weapons to make room for the refugees and they blow up the cache to cover their escape. Gene and Billy decide to sell the aircraft to recoup Gene's money.

The postscript reveals General Soong moves to the United States and opens a Holiday Inn. Gene wins a lottery in Thailand in 1975, and Billy is deported from Thailand for fixing the lottery Gene won.

== Cast ==
- Mel Gibson as Gene Ryack
- Robert Downey Jr. as Billy Covington
- Nancy Travis as Corinne Landreaux
- Ken Jenkins as Major Donald Lemond (Based on Richard Secord)
- David Marshall Grant as Robert Diehl (Based on Jerry Daniels)
- Lane Smith as Senator Davenport (Based on Senator Stuart Symington)
- Art LaFleur as Jack Neely
- Ned Eisenberg as Nick Pirelli
- Marshall Bell as O.V.
- David Bowe as Saunders
- Burt Kwouk as General Lu Soong (Based on General Vang Pao)
- Tim Thomerson as Babo
- Harvey Jason as Nino

== Production ==
=== Development ===
Director Richard Rush tried to develop the film in 1985, as the first comedy about Vietnam. Carolco Pictures bought the project as Rush wrote a script and found locations. Sean Connery was attached to play the older pilot, Gene Ryack, and the younger flier Billy Covington was at different times to be played by Bill Murray, James Belushi and Kevin Costner. The project was sold to producer Daniel Melnick after Connery and Costner became too expensive. Melnick hired screenwriter John Eskow to write a new script; and first hired director Bob Rafelson to work with Rush, but eventually hiring director Roger Spottiswoode. Mel Gibson was cast for a reported $7 million, for the role of Ryack, and Robert Downey Jr. took on the role of Covington. Nancy Travis was cast as Corinne Landroaux, replacing Ally Sheedy, and Michael Dudikoff was cast as General Lee.

=== Filming ===
The budget of Air America increased to $35 million as the production involved a 500-member crew shooting in 49 different locations between Thailand, London, and Los Angeles; operating between eight and fifteen cameras at a time. Principal photography began on October 3, 1989, and continued until February 10, 1990. The production was plagued by two earthquakes and a typhoon. The producers rented 26 aircraft from the Thai military, although some of the stunt flyers refused to perform some of the stunts, with 60-year-old veterans being drafted for the more demanding turns. PepsiCo wanted the filmmakers to use a fictional soda rather than show opium being refined at their abandoned factory. Therefore, the producers added a line about wondering if Pepsi knew what was going on. After previewing the film, six months after production, Gibson and other principals were called back to film a new ending.

== Soundtrack ==
Air America: Original Soundtrack Album

Soundtrack album by Various artists
- Released: 1990
- Recorded: 1990
- Genre: Rock
- Length: 33:45
- Label: MCA Records
- Producers: Becky Mancuso, Tim Sexton, Magstripe Entertainment

Professional ratings
Review scores
Source	Rating
AllMusic	2/5 stars

No.	Title	Writer(s)	Performed by	Length
1.	"Love Me Two Times"	John Densmore, Robby Krieger, Ray Manzarek, Jim Morrison	Aerosmith	3:22
2.	"Right Place, Wrong Time"	Mac Rebennack	B.B. King and Bonnie Raitt	3:37
3.	"Long Cool Woman in a Black Dress"	Roger Cook, Allan Clarke, Roger Greenaway	Charlie Sexton	4:15
4.	"Do It Again"	Donald Fagen, Walter Becker	Steely Dan	5:01
5.	"Free Ride"	Dan Hartman	Edgar Winter and Rick Derringer	3:23
6.	"California Dreamin'"	John Phillips, Michelle Gilliam	The Mamas & the Papas	2:38
7.	"Baby, I Need Your Lovin'"	Brian Holland, Lamont Dozier, Edward Holland Jr.	Four Tops	2:44
8.	"Get Ready"	William "Smokey" Robinson	The Temptations	2:38
9.	"Rescue Me"	Fontella Bass, Raynard Miner, Carl William Smith	Fontella Bass	2:53
10.	"Pushin' Too Hard"	Sky Saxon	The Seeds	2:35

== Reception ==
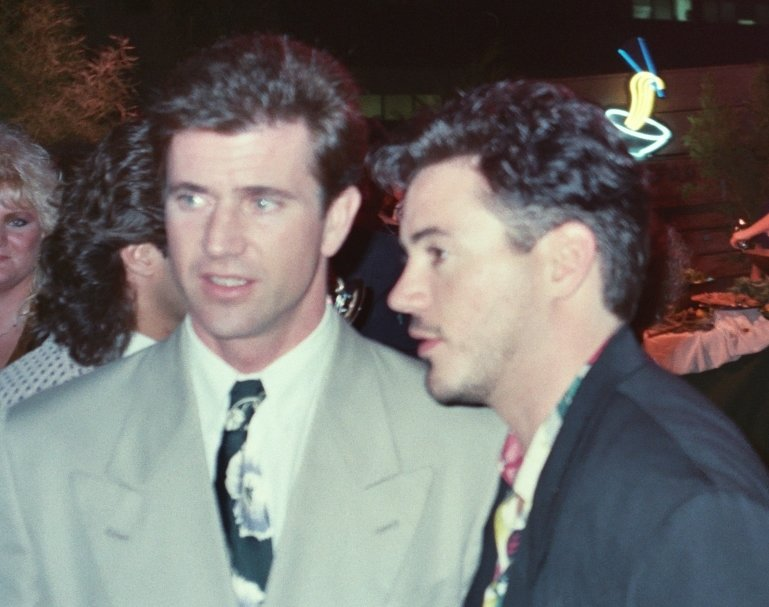
Robert Downey Jr. and Mel Gibson attending the film's 1990 premiere at Grauman's Chinese Theatre in Los Angeles.

On review aggregator website Rotten Tomatoes, the film holds an approval rating of 12% based on 17 reviews, with an average rating of 3.4/10. Metacritic reports a weighted average score of 33 out of 100, based on 13 critics, indicating "generally unfavorable" reviews. Audiences polled by CinemaScore gave the film an average grade of "B" on an A+ to F scale.

Upon its release, Air America was embroiled in controversy over its treatment of the "secret CIA airline service." After the Persian Gulf War began on January 15, 1991, the film was withdrawn from distribution in over 100 cinemas throughout Germany. Air America received mostly negative reviews from critics. The film review in The New York Times by Caryn James, saw the film as a flawed "star vehicle". "This muddled film about a secret C.I.A. project in Laos in 1969 fails on every possible level: as action film, as buddy film, as scenic travelogue and even, sad to say, as a way to flaunt Mel Gibson's appeal." Film historian Alun Evans in Brassey's Guide to War Films, in his commentary, was brief but pointed in characterizing Air America as a "... tawdry, unfunny war comedy."

Some criticism was levelled at the inaccuracies prevalent in the production. The review of Air America in the St. Paul Pioneer Press noted: "... the comedy adventure doesn't feature any real heroes of that war, men like the Hmong pilot Lee Lue." Christopher Robbins said the movie distorted his book's presentation of the Air America story, and historian William Leary noted "The exploits of CAT/Air America form a unique chapter in the history of air transport, one that deserves better than a misleading, mediocre movie."

British film critic Andy Webb opined that Air America worked as an aviation film. "... on a small positive some of the flying stunts, and there are plenty of them, are pretty spectacular. In a movie which almost floats these moments of aeronautic acrobats (they) give an injection of adrenalin although by no means enough to save it."

Alexander Cockburn wrote in the Los Angeles Times that Air America received abuse for "dar[ing] to say the unsayable, and commits the added offense of joking about it ... It injects into mass culture truth on a matter that official America has been lying about for three decades, namely the confluence between U.S. covert operations and criminality, whether in Laos, Afghanistan or Central America".

=== Box office ===
Air America debuted at number three behind Flatliners and Young Guns II. The film ended up grossing $31,053,601 in the US and $3,243,404 in other countries for a worldwide total of $36,297,005.

== Bibliography ==
- Carrrick, Peter. Mel Gibson. London: Robert Hale, 1998. ISBN 978-0-70906-088-8.
- Clarkson, Wensley. Mel Gibson: Man on a Mission. London: John Blake, 2004. ISBN 978-1-85782-577-0.
- Curry, Robert. Whispering Death, "Tuag Nco Ntsoov": Our Journey with the Hmong in the Secret War for Laos. Bloomington, Indiana: IUniverse Inc., 2004. ISBN 978-0-59576-639-0.
- Evans, Alun. Brassey's Guide to War Films. Dulles, Virginia: Potomac Books, 2000. ISBN 1-57488-263-5.
- Hamilton-Merritt, Jane. Tragic Mountains: The Hmong, the Americans, and the Secret Wars for Laos, 1942-1992 . Bloomington, Indiana: Indiana University Press, 1999. ISBN 978-0-25320-756-2.
- Robbins, Christopher. Air America. Cassell Military 2012. ISBN 978-1908059017.
