= Kaidan Restaurant =

Japanese media franchise

怪談レストラン (Kaidan Resutoran)
- Genre: Horror, mystery, supernatural
- Anime television series
- Directed by: Yoko Ikeda
- Produced by: Tomomi Imagawa (eps 1-11); Tomoharu Matsuhisa (eps 11-23); Takashi Washio; Yosuke Asama (eps 1-11)
- Written by: Shoji Yonemura
- Music by: Hiroshi Takaki
- Studio: Toei Animation
- Original network: ANN (TV Asahi)
- Original run: October 13, 2009 – June 8, 2010
- Episodes: 23
- Live-action film
- Directed by: Masayuki Ochiai
- Produced by: Ten Washio; Tomoharu Matsuhisa
- Written by: Shōji Yonemura
- Studio: Toei
- Released: August 21, 2010
- Runtime: 100 minutes
- icon

Kaidan Restaurant (Japanese: 怪談レストラン, Hepburn: Kaidan Resutoran) is a Japanese children's storybook series. The books take the form of horror anthologies, edited by Miyoko Matsutani and illustrated by Yoshikazu Takai and Kumiko Katō. As of 2007, there were 50 volumes published by Doshinsha. Over 8 million copies of the books have been published so far.

The books were adapted into a TV anime series by Toei Animation, which began airing in 2009. It derives its name from "kaidan", which loosely translates to "thriller" (from "kai", meaning strange, mysterious, rare or bewitching apparition, and "dan", meaning talk or recited narrative; a more direct translation would be a ghost or horror story). Rather than forming a linear plot, the anime follows the anthology format of the book and tells a collection of ghost stories similar to what would be traditionally told around a campfire. The anime was frequently among the 10 highest rated anime shows of the week in Japan.

The series was adapted into a hybrid live-action and anime feature film in 2010 starring Ayano Kudo.

== Plot ==
There is a loose theme throughout the series of the "Thriller Restaurant", which is introduced in the first episode. The remainder of the series is a collection of ghost stories reminiscent of the Scary Stories anthology and Kwaidan.

Each episode is broken up into three "dishes", namely the Appetizer, the Main Dish, and the Dessert. The "Appetizer" is a short story featuring something supernatural, such as ghosts, spirits, or similar. The "Main Dish" is a longer ghost story similar to the Appetizer, usually with a twist. The "Dessert" is a ghost story told by one of the main characters while playing Hyakumonogatari Kaidankai (百物語怪談会, Hyakumonogatari Kaidankai). These involve characters not related to the series and end with some sort of a moral lesson. From the thirteenth episode onwards, a fourth story is told while the ending score plays, replacing the original animation; these stories have a scary picture shown when the music ends.

== Characters ==
=== Main characters ===
Ako Ozora (大空 アコ, Ōzora Ako)

Voiced by: Ryoko Shiraishi

Ako is a grade schooler currently attending Yamazakura Elementary School. She is a bright and cheerful girl, who wants to write novels when she'll grow up. She doesn't have a fascination about ghost stories in general, but her will to always find out the truth doesn't let her walk away from a mystery.
She is the first of her classmates to make friends with Sho after his transfer to Yamazakura.
Sho Komoto (甲本 ショウ, Kōmoto Shō)

Voiced by: Hiro Yuki

Sho is a new transfer student at Yamazakura, who has recently moved back to Japan. He is handsome and is popular with the girls, although he likes being alone and doesn't have many friends. He loves ghost stories and has a whole room full of scary stories, he collects them from all around the world. He can also read rōmaji.
Reiko Sakuma (佐久間 レイコ, Sakuma Reiko)

Voiced by: Masumi Asano

Reiko is the class representative for Ako's class. She has a strong defiance towards everything even seemingly supernatural, but still tags along every time it is concerned. Her reasons are revealed as the story progresses.
Ghastly Garçon (おばけギャルソン, Obake Garuson)

Voiced by: Hiroaki Hirata

The ghost garçon (waiter) is the manager of the Restaurant. He introduces every meal. He typically appears during the opening credits, and after the main course, to wrap up the show.

=== Supporting characters ===
Yuma Misakubo (水窪 ユウマ, Misakubo Yūma)

Voiced by: Yoshihisa Kawahara

Takuma (たくま, Takuma)

Voiced by: Hisayoshi Suganuma

Michiko Ishimoto (石本 みちこ, Ishimoto Michiko)

Voiced by: Machiko Toyoshima

One of Ako's classmates.

Mari Kowada (小和田 まり, Kowada Mari)

Voiced by: Yuko Yajima

One of Ako's friends.

Kazuyo Ozora (大空 カズヨ, Ozora Kazuyo)

Voiced by: Ai Maeda

Ako's mother.

Koji Ozora (大空 コウジ, Ozora Kouji)

Voiced by: Kentaro Ito

Ako's father.

Bunta Ozora (大空 ブンタ, Ōzora Bunta)

Voiced by: Fuyuka Oura

Ako's younger brother.

Kicchom (きっちょむ, Kicchomu)

== Episode list ==
=== Anime ===
No.	Title	Original release date
1	"Thriller Restaurant: The Kikimora's Puppet: She's Gone Forever..."; Transliteration: "Kaidan Resutoran: Kikiimora Ningyou: Itte Shimatta Onnanoko..." (Japanese: 怪談レストラン: キキーモラ人形: 行ってしまった女の子...)	October 13, 2009
The meal in this episode is introduced by Garçon himself. Thriller Restaurant; Ako is daydreaming during school when a new transfer student (Sho) arrives and sits next to her during class. Reiko suggests that Ako shows him around town. When Ako mentions that the "Thriller Restaurant" is haunted, Sho insists they visit it, much to Ako's dismay. While there, they explore the building, and Sho records the whole thing on a camcorder. Ako answers a ringing phone, which welcomes her to The Thriller Restaurant, and is then immobilized, which Sho's camcorder reveals to be a ghost holding Ako's leg in place. They flee the restaurant, where Reiko is waiting. She tells them that she was the one who called the phone, although she never said any of the things Ako heard... The Kikimora Puppet; Ako's class is brainstorming ideas for a class play for the upcoming cultural festival, when Sho suggests the story of the Kikimora; a ghost, that - just like the Grim Reaper - comes to take souls, and complains about bad housekeeping. Reiko tells Ako that she should write the script for the play. After class, Ako, Reiko, Mari and Sho sit down to make a Kikimora puppet. Sho tells the girls that a famous puppet maker once said, a puppet can only come to life if it can stand on its own feet. Reiko retorts that one can give a soul to a puppet by breathing into its mouth. Sho warns her not to do it, but Reiko taunts them and does it anyway. She immediately starts sobbing, saying something is "squeezing her heart". After school, Ako returns to the classroom to retrieve her recorder. Reiko appears, telling her she will die, then attacks her. Sho arrives, telling Ako to suck Reiko's spirit out of the puppet and breathe it back into her mouth, using the recorder. Once Reiko is pacified, Sho smashes the Kikimora puppet's wireframe, effectively destroying it. Reiko recovers, but she doesn't remember anything that happened while the Kikimora had her soul... She's Gone Forever... Ako tells the story of a school that had a giant mirror along one of its stairway platforms. Rumor had it that at midnight, you could pass through the mirror into the afterlife. One day, a girl stood before the mirror, saying that at midnight, she would explore the afterlife. The next day, the girl went missing; only her shoes were left sitting in front of the mirror. She was never seen or heard from again, and when the old building was demolished, the mirror shattered, too. Ako ends the story by saying It is said, that she was lost forever.
2	"The Cat Goes To School: The Path To The Bottomless Pond: Become A Flounder"; Transliteration: "Neko, Gakkou he Iku: Ike no Fuchi no Michi: Hirame ni Nare" (Japanese: 猫、学校へいく: 池のふちの道: ひらめになれ)	October 20, 2009
The meal in this episode is introduced by Bakeneko. The Cat Goes To School; During lunch, Ako's classmate, Yoshio, is bullied by other kids because he doesn't like fish or milk, which they pile on his plate in generous helpings. The next morning, Yoshio pretends to be sick, then confesses to his cat, Totto, that he's afraid of being bullied. Meanwhile at school, Yoshio arrives, but he is acting strange. Sho notices weird hairs on Yoshio's chair, and at lunch, he shows none of his hate for fish and milk; rather, he wolfs the fish down as fast as he can, then pours the milk into a saucer and proceeds to drink it by lapping at it with his tongue. The bullies tell him to cut it out, whereupon Yoshio rips open their aprons, threatening them to never bully him again. He then runs away, and Sho and Ako follow him. He leaps over a wall, but behind it, Sho and Ako find Totto. They visit Yoshio at home, and Yoshio tells them that he had been home all day... The Path To The Bottomless Pond; Ako and her family go to visit her grandparents in the town where her father lived when he was little. While there, he promises to take Bunta to the pond where he used to fish. He goes visiting some of his old friends, one of which relates the old story about Kenji Asada, a boy their age who drowned in the pond while fishing, and how you could still hear him calling for help. On the way home, Ako's father gets caught in the rain. He decides to take the shortcut through the forest, which takes him by the pond. At the pond, he hears a voice cry out for help. He panics and runs back home, where the family is looking for Bunta, who has gone missing. They say he may have gone fishing alone. Ako's father, realizing his grave mistake, rushes back to the pond. He finds Bunta in the tall grass at the pond's edge. Bunta says he was fishing when he slipped and fell into the pond. He was then pushed back ashore by a boy wearing a name tag that says "Asada"... Become A Flounder Ako tells the story of a girl, Midori, who came across a cursed doll. If you wanted to hurt someone, you could stick a pin in the doll and bury it while saying the person's name. Midori remembered the girl who sat next to her in class, Kanaya, who would always sneak glances at Midori's notes. Midori relates this side-glancing to a flounder, which has two eyes on the side of its head, so she buried the doll, wishing Kanaya would become a flounder. From the next day on, Kanaya was absent from class. One day, when Midori is helping at the shop, a flounder speaks to her, and Midori knows it is Kanaya. Kanaya then turns Midori into a flounder, which Midori's father then cuts up into sashimi. Ako ends the story by saying the flounder you had for dinner tonight could have been somebody too ...
3	"Goodbye: The Midnight Princess: Passenger On A Rainy Night"; Transliteration: "Ja, Baai: Mayonaka no Oujo: U no Yoru no Kyaku" (Japanese: じゃ、バーイ: 真夜中の王女: 雨の夜の客)	October 27, 2009
The meal in this episode is introduced by the Ghastly Widow. Goodbye; Ako meets Bunta at his school, where he is participating in a Go tournament, elimination style. Bunta's first opponent is Michio Sakai, the runner-up of the previous year's tournament. Meanwhile, Michio is running late to the tournament. He runs into a crowd, who have gathered around an accident scene. Michio squeezes his way through, and makes it to the school just in time for the first match, although when he arrives, Bunta points out that he is looking unnaturally pale. The first match ends with Bunta conceding, and Michio advances his way through the bracket, but during the later matches, Michio's hand starts disappearing as he plays his piece. During the final match, Ako sees a news report saying that Michio was hit by a truck earlier that day, and had died in the hospital a few minutes ago. At this realization, Michio insists the match is finished. He wins, and his spirit moves on, saying he is finally "number one"... The Midnight Princess; Ako and Reiko go to Sho's house, which turns out to be a funeral home, to do homework. They go to Sho's room, which is filled with shelves covered in ghost stories written in many languages. Sho reads one of them, called The Midnight Princess. At the beginning, a princess of a foreign country dies. Before she does, however, she instructs that at the event of her death, the should be put in a coffin in the church, and her coffin should be guarded by a single guard every night. Her wish is honored, but every night, the guard would disappear at midnight. One day, a guard named Joseph was assigned to guard the coffin. His mother reassured him, since he had his father's rosary, which he prayed to every day. On the way to the church, Joseph meets a stranger that tells him to hide under the pulpit until the hour after midnight. He did so, and at midnight, the princess rose, searching for him, but could not find him. The next day, he was asked to guard the coffin again. The stranger appeared a second time, telling him to hide behind the altar this time. Again, he did so, and again, the princess could not find him. Joseph is asked to guard the coffin one last time. The stranger appears, telling him to hide in the confessional. He reveals that the princess is possessed, and the demon will die if it doesn't eat for three days. He does so, and when the demon appears, it transforms into its true form, scaring Joseph and causing him to drop the rosary. She sees him, and advances on him. He recovers the rosary just as the clock strikes one. The demon disappears, and the princess is revived. The king marries her to Joseph. The stranger appears one final time, and reveals himself to be Joseph's father... Passenger On A Rainy Night Sho tells the story of a taxi driver, who picks up a young girl next to a pond. She asks him to drive her to Yotsuya. She is completely silent during the entire ride. When they arrive at Yotsuya, the girl asks the driver to wait while she gets money to pay for the fare. The driver agrees, but the girl does not return for a while. Finally, he walks up to the door, and an older woman answers it. He asks about the girl, but when he describes what she was wearing, the woman reveals that it was her daughter wearing the clothes she wore on the day she died, the taxi she was driving in having crashed in to the pond. The driver rushes back to the taxi, but immediately after he closes the door, the car fills with water and the girl reappears in the back seat. Sho ends the story by saying And the girl said, please take me back to the pond ...
4	"Spirited Away: The Elder At Well's End: The White Muffler"; Transliteration: "Kami Kakushi: Ido no Soko Nobaasama: Shiroi Mafuraa" (Japanese: 神かくし: 井戸の底のばあさま: 白いマフラー)	November 10, 2009
The meals in this episode are introduced by Kappa. Spirited Away; Ako and Sho visit Yamazakura shrine and find Yuma and Takuma playing video games there. They taunt Ako, implying that she and Sho are a couple. Yuma discards an empty water bottle at the yorishiro, which punishes him by causing him to vanish. Ako's mother receives a call later that night from Mrs. Ishimoto, saying that Yuma hasn't returned. Ako, along with Yuma's parents, other classmates, and the police, search the temple grounds. Meanwhile, Yuma wakes up in the yorishiro's high branches and sees the search going on. He tries to call them, but they don't respond, and when he tries to grab Takuma, he passes through him. The search breaks up and everyone goes home. Yuma tries to follow them, but a barrier prevents him from leaving the shrine grounds. Then the yorishiro tells him he must clean the whole grounds if he wants to return home. The next day, Ako and Sho return to the shrine and find a sullen Takuma. They realize that Yuma might be spirited away, and Yuma shakes the tree's branches, revealing he is there. Later, they find him slumped against the trunk. He is overjoyed, then fervently cleans the shrine once more, afraid that me might get spirited away again... The Elder At Well's End; Ako sees an old woman near a sealed well while passing a construction area. She flees and returns with Sho, and the two meet up with Reiko. Sho digs up a stone next to the well, which conceal a pile of sutras. The old woman appears and tells her story while Sho records on his camcorder. She tells the story of Hanako, a young girl who is worked by her stepmother, who spoils her stepsister. One day, the girl drops her stepmother's precious plate down a well, and is told to go into the well to retrieve it. She climbs down the well, and at the bottom she finds a vast meadow with a small house. Inside the house, the old woman asks her to help get rid of her lice, and the girl agrees. She returns the dish, and gives her an elegant kimono. She tells her stepmother about the old woman, who sends her stepsister, Takeko down the well to get all of the old woman's treasures. The woman asks the stepsister to help get rid of her lice, which she refuses to do, and the woman slams the window shut. The stepmother goes down the well to find her daughter, but falls. The old woman then causes the well to collapse, crushing them. The old woman requests that Ako, Sho, and Reiko give the property a proper exorcism. They pass the message to the property owner, who disregards the request, since the old woman had disappeared from the camcorder's footage... The White Muffler Reiko tells the story of a woman stitching a muffler on a balcony. She asks Reiko if there is such thing as "the perfect crime". She tells her about a woman who grew to hate her husband, so she asked a swamp hag for advice on how to get rid of him. She says to plant silk seeds during the full moon, water the seeds during the full moon, extract the fabric during the full moon, knit a robe during the full moon, and give the robe to her husband during the full moon. She did all of this, and her husband disappeared the next day. The woman says this is "the perfect crime", and says she just finished knitting her muffler. Reiko ends the story by saying That night, there really was a full moon...
5	"The Wolf's Gaze: Grim Reaper Killer: You're Next"; Transliteration: "Ookami No Hikaru Me: Shinigami Kiraa: Tsugi wa Omae da" (Japanese: オオカミのひかる目: 死神キラー: つぎはおまえだ)	November 17, 2009
The meals in this episode are introduced by the Grim Reaper. The Wolf's Gaze; Ako meets up with her uncle who she loved dearly. He shows her pictures from his last trip and tells her how he plans to go to India to see the sun rise on the grasslands. Soon after that her uncle goes to India, she finds out he died in the grasslands. Her father went to India to get the body and all his belongings. Along with his stuff is a letter to Ako along with a gift. The letter says how her uncle saw the sun rise and set. Once the sun set though, wolves chased him up a tree only leaving when the sun rose again. He then tells of going to a market and buying her a gift: a cloth with a tree and shards of eyes around the bottom which he says looked like the wolves' eyes. He then says how he is going to go back and see the wolves' eyes again. Ako is very upset with his death and treasures the cloth, pinning it to the wall next to her bed. She then goes to sleep. In the middle of the night she wakes up to see that her floor has turned to grass, and a wolf is next to her bed glaring at her. Frightened by the wolf in her room, she freezes. After realizing that if she doesn't move the wolf will kill her, she grabs the cloth and holds it up, repelling the wolf. The next day at school she talks to Sho about the wolf. He suggests to her that perhaps her uncle wanted her to figure it out. The next night she is woken up again, this time the wolf is on top of her. She panics, but hears her uncle's voice. The wolf then turned into her uncle. He tells her he's fine and that just because he died traveling doesn't mean she should be scared to travel. He asks her to tell her dad he's fine, then says good bye and leaves her. Grim Reaper Killer; Ako tells Sho the story of the Grim Reaper Hospital, where everyone is said to die who goes there for treatment. She also tells him that Bunta saw shinigami there. Ako's father woke up with a stomach ache and his wife forced him to go to the Grim Reaper Hospital despite his fear of dying. Bunta then tells his father he'd go with him. Once they get there they can't find anyone who works there. Bunta becomes thirsty and goes to buy a drink but stumbles upon another vending machine and overhears shinigami complaining about an arrogant doctor who unfairly tells all of his patients that they won't live very long, thereby condemning them to death before their time. Bunta listens in on the spirits grouse about the trouble the doctor is causing for a while until he drops a coin, alerting them to his presence. They chase him up the steps and he grabs his father, dragging him out of the hospital. Ako later tells us that her father just had gastritis. Later, the doctor is seen in his posh apartment, where he is confronted by the head shinigami for his misdeeds. The doctor yells at the shinigami that it only has 3 months to live. As an ironic punishment for his arrogance, the shingami gives the doctor three months to live. The doctor then dies three months later. You're Next Sho tells the story of a hunter who waits for his prey. He sits in a bush and watches a worm eaten by a frog the frog by a snake the snake by a bird and the bird by him. Upon killing the bird he realizes that he's next in the chain, and is attacked from behind. Sho ends the story by saying Although no-one saw how this being looks like, it is said that his laugh has always echoed in the mountains.
6	"Spooky School: The House On The Ridge: Princess Of The Pot"; Transliteration: "Kowai Gakkou: Tougeno Ichi Ken Ie: Tsubo Himesama" (Japanese: こわーい学校: とうげの一けん家: つぼひめさま)	November 24, 2009
The meals in this episode are introduced by Mecha-Kinjiro. Spooky School; Ako and Yuma are sent in the forest to map the temple on one of the mountains near Yamazakura, when they find a mysterious school building. When they enter the school, they find many children who invites them to the dinner. However, they discover that the children and their leader are actually demons who eat human meat and that they are the dinner! While escaping, they accidentally roll under a bush of hiiragi, which is said to repel demons and saves their lives. The House On the Ridge; Ako and family stay at a lodge on vacation when it starts raining. Ako pulls her brother's leg by telling him the story of the Phantom Truck, which drives the mountain on rainy nights and steals any children passing by. Ako then hears a broken down vehicle in the night. The noise wakes up the whole family including Kicchomu, the family dog. Everyone apart from Bunta goes to investigate. The dad sees that the driver's sleeve is bloodied, but he driver explains that he cut himself whilst trying to repair the engine. The family try to help but the driver insists they go back inside as it's raining. Kicchomu starts barking at the driver. Bunta runs to them, sees the driver then runs back home. The dad gives the driver an umbrella who tells them that he will walk to his destination. The police appears and tells the family that a woman was murdered face down in her blood that night and that the driver was a suspect. That morning Ako's dad tells the family that the culprit was caught at night. Bunta explains that he was scared because he saw a woman on the driver's back. The woman's face was all bloody and what scared him the most were her eyes. Princess Of The Pot Ako tells a story about when she was in the first grade. In her school, there was a rumor about a ghost in the girls' bathroom, however, Ako did not believe in it. One day, when Ako was in the bathroom alone she started to hear a voice saying Help me ... it's dark in here... She later learnt that the area her school was built on was actually a castle. The princess of the castle was murdered by one of her servants and her body placed in a pot. Ako ends the story by saying She must be really lonely in that pot...
7	"Lady Car: Tatty: Bells From The After-Life"; Transliteration: "Kaa Obasan: Taachan: Ano Yo Karano Suzu No Oto" (Japanese: カーおばさん: たあちゃん: あの世からの鈴の音)	December 1, 2009
The meals in this episode are introduced by an Okiku doll. Lady Car; Ako hears from her classmates a rumor about a lady, who is said to appear on a certain overpass at night, ask children what their favorite number is, and would throw them off the overpass if certain conditions aren't met. That same night Ako is sent to throw the garbage out. She meets the ghost woman who tells her to pick a number. Ako is then forced to play her game, and is told that if the fourth car to pass through is not a semi, or one passes before the fourth, she will kill her. She also tells her she wants Ako to keep her son, Takeshi company, who died in a traffic accident when he fell off the overpass and was hit by a truck. Ako has bad luck, but before she could push her off, Takeshi appears to take his mother with him to the afterlife. Tatty; The class makes dolls out of clay when Sho, after getting praised, says that dolls might host a soul or spirit, so he hast to do his best making them. Then Sensei tells the class of the time when she was in college and had a clay doll, Taachan, who was left in her apartment from an earlier tenant. However, Taachan had a will on her own, and a love story unfolded. Bells From The After-Life Sho tells the story of two girls from school, who decide to ring bells when one dies ahead of the other, to tell each other that the afterlife exists. One year later one of them dies in a car accident. At her funeral the best friend offers incense, when she hears a bell ringing. Everyone at the funeral can hear the same bell. The girl believes her friend has kept her promise and that there is an afterlife. However the sound of the bell grows louder and overbearing, as if she was being desperate to escape. Sho ends the story by saying What kind of world awaits us in the afterlife?
8	"Room 31: Don't Turn Around: The Broken Photocopier"; Transliteration: "31 Goushitsu: Furimukuna: Kopii Ki Kara Gikogikogikogiko" (Japanese: 31号室: ふりむくな: コピー機からギコギコギコギコ)	December 8, 2009
The meals are introduced by the Wind-up Old lady. Room 31; Anko meets a family friend on the way back from school, who is on her way to the temple with her husband to celebrate her mother's 7th death anniversary. Anko, who also knew her well, tells her she thought of her mother like she was her granny. She also tells her she wants to bring her favorite snacks when she was alive, and will offer incense, too. On her way to the store she bumps into a shady man who drops his wallet. Anko follows him to an old apartment, and sees him enter room 31. But when she tries to give the wallet back, an old lady opens the door claiming she lives there alone. She speaks kindly to Ako, but when she lingers too long, she suddenly snaps at her and sends her away. That evening a murder is announced on TV. Anko realizes that the murderer was the man she was looking for. Anko and Sho go back to the apartment the next day, but nobody knows about the old woman. Anko later drops by to the anniversary, and is shown a younger picture of the deceased. It turns out she has been protecting her all along... Don't Turn Around; Reiko came down with a cold. Sho invites Anko over, and tells her about an Italian book he has recently read. An orphaned boy called Giovanni lives alone with his Grandpa, who has a heart condition. One night he turns ill, and Giovanni must go through a mountain road called Demon's Pass to get to the doctor in time. When he informs the doctor about what happened, he hurries over to the cottage right away. Giovanni, however, refuses to go with him not to slow the horse down, and once again takes Demon's Pass to return home. On his way, he hears his father speaking to him, telling him that he cannot ascend to Heaven unless he turns around. Giovanni resists the temptation and goes on. Then he hears his grandmother's voice, claiming that she has to wash clothes in a cold stream eternally if he doesn't save her. But once again, he remembers the promise he made to his grandfather and walks on. Then his mother's voice speaks to him, telling him to look at her to finally know how she was like. Giovanni bursts into tears, but keeps to his promise and runs up the hill. When he reaches the top, he turns back and saws a rooster with hooves, the devil itself. It praises Giovanni for not turning back, tells him he could've taken his soul if he did and leaves. Giovanni's grandpa survives the night. Sho asks Ako if she would have the courage not to turn back when hearing the voice of someone she knows. And then on her way home, Anko hears a familiar voice calling out for her.... The Broken Photocopier Ako tells the story of the ghost of a famous model, who committed suicide. She has appeared at the building ever since, where she lost her job because a fellow model slandered her and snatched her opportunities. But when she tries to make a copy of her picture, the printer seems to malfunction... Ako ends the story by saying And it was her face.
9	"I Saw My Funeral: Gift from the Water Fairy: My Wife Vanished in Morocco"; Transliteration: "Jibun no Soushiki wo Mita: Mizu no Sei no Okurimono: Morokko de Kieta Niizuma" (Japanese: 自分の葬式をみた: 水の精のおくりもの: モロッコで消えた新妻)	January 19, 2010
The meal is introduced by FlameBoy, a will-o-wisp. I Saw My Funeral; Every day at 2 p.m., Anko sees a will-o-wisp emerge from the town, flying off being followed by a funeral. The person she has seen dies in a few hours. But when they try to document this with Sho's camcorder, the will-o-whisp emerges from Anko herself. They chase after it desperately to return it to her body, and Anko sees the mirages of her grieving family following the sphere. They almost lose track of it, but then Reiko accidentally swings the events to the right direction. Gift From The Water Fairy; Anko's mother wants to teach Bunta a lesson, and tells them about the time when she made friends with a water fairy, when she was Bunta's age. However, she eventually got homesick and the fairy returned her to the surface; but before he let her go he gave part of his soul to her in the form of a globe filled with pure water. He told her that as long as she treasures the globe they will never really be apart, but if harm comes to it, he will return to take away what she treasures the most. She gives him a toy globe they got from a trip, but Bunta accidentally breaks it and panics when she and Anko start saying that the fairy will come for him. But then the lights go out, an enormous storm breaks out and someone unexpected is knocking on the door... My Wife Vanished In Morocco Sho tells the urban legend of german newly-wed couple Mark and Andrea, who go for their honeymoon in Morocco. However, when he wants to take her picture, Andrea suddenly vanishes in the flare... Sho ends the story by saying He always felt like she would once again appear, saying 'Come on, take it already'...
10	"The Mansion of Blue Flames: Her Little White House: The Ringtone from Beyond"; Transliteration: "Aoi Honoo no Yakata: Shiroi Ie no Shōjo: Ano Yo kara no Chaku Mero" (Japanese: 青い炎の館: 白い家の少女: あの世からの着メロ)	January 26, 2010
The meals are introduced by Baku. The Mansion of Blue Flames; Ako's class is rehearsing a play about vampires for the arts festival. Reiko claims the role of the protagonist, while Mari complains that she, too, wanted the role. Anko tells them she had to write the entire script and will have to be the narrator, but the teacher interrupts them. Reiko tells everyone that the cast and stage often has to be purified by an exorcist, so that a curse possibly related to the play would not pass on to them. Takuma says it's about vampires and not vengeful spirits, and Sho notes that she usually dismisses rumors like this. Reiko says that she doesn't believe in it, but was worried about the others. The play then begins. Reiko plays Mina, a girl who got lost in a storm and was found by Lumen (played by Sho), a dashing young gentleman. His father (played by Yuuma) appears, and asks her to marry his son. Mina agrees, and Lumen confesses his love. However, he wants to take Mina's blood, who is saved by the crucifix pendant she wears around her neck. Lumen runs off, and Mina tries to escape the castle, but cannot find her way out. Then she founds the father's casket, realizes that they are both vampires. Lumen tells her that he now has to kill her, but instead he shows her a secret escape route and lets her go. Yet the night fell on Mina, and Lumen's father found her in the woods, wanting to turn her. Lumen arrives as well, and tries to protect Mina. He takes her crucifix, wards off his father but is killed doing so. Mina cries as he and their mansion disappears in blue flames. But after the curtains close, Reiko starts acting weird. She uncovers her eyes which turned red, and she growls that Lumen is dead, but she will live on as a vampire and suck everyone's blood. Sho claps, and praises her for her acting talent. Reiko then takes her fake teeth and colored contact lens out, and laughs. The play becomes a success. Her Little White House; Sho and Ako are at the Car Graveyard at sundown, and Sho shows Ako the evening star on the sky, explaining her that it's actually Venus, and that it is something he loves just as much as the scary stories. Ako had a dream that night, where she had a pair of winged boots and flew through the sky. But when she tried to fly towards Venus, her wings fell off and she woke up. Next day she tells Sho what happened, and he says he too would like to walk the sky once. Sho then shows Ako a planisphere he bought from the internet, and that he's concerned about a recurring dream he's been having ever since. In this dream he's on a field under a starry sky, which resembles the planisphere. On the field there is a little white house, with a blond girl sitting alone next to the window. Whenever he tried to go closer and call out to her, he stopped and then he woke up. When Ako asks him why, he says it's because she somehow reminded him of Venus and he became shy. He tells Ako that he would like to find out why he's seeing the dream, and Ako offers him her help. Sho permits her to enter his dream, which happens that very night. They fly to the house and find its door open. They meet the blond girl who is playing with the planisphere, who says she's been waiting for him for a long time, but he always woke up last minute. Anko suspiciously asks her what she is, and she retorts that she only invited Sho. She tries to trap them in the house, and starts turning the planisphere backwards to keep them young forever. Anko grabs Sho, and pulls him out through the window. When the girl tries to catch them, she lets go of the planisphere, making her and the house become old in an instant. The girl chases after them, but then Sho instructs Ako to fly towards the Venus like she did for the first time, and when her wings fall off they both return to their bodies. The next day Sho tells her he had the same dream. The Ringtone from Beyond Anko tells of a girl named Junko, who bought a cell phone, and texted her grandpa every day. They chose the melody of their hometown as a ringtone. He lived in a mountain lodge. One day a storm broke out, and he tried to descend to the town for shelter, but got caught in a landslide and died. On his funeral, Jun placed his phone in the casket, and asked him never to forget her. Suddenly, her phone rang with the tone only the two of them used... Anko ends the story by saying That was the last time she received a mail from him.
11	"Whose Coat is This?: Monster Mansion: You've Got a Hand on Your Back"; Transliteration: "Dare no Kooto?: Yuurei Yashiki: Senaka ni Te no Ato ga" (Japanese: 誰のコート?: 幽霊屋敷: 背中に手のあとが)	February 2, 2010
In this episode the meals are presented by the Grim Reaper. Whose Coat is This? Anko and her mum are making dinner, when suddenly they hear someone knocking on the door. Anko opens the door, but no one seems to be outside. She goes back in only to see that the floor is covered in muddy footprints. Both Anko and Bunta are scolded by their mum for leaving them but they say it couldn't be them. Kouji comes home from work, and when he wants to hang his coat he sees a coat on the hanger that doesn't belong to him. He asks if Bunta brought it home but he denies it. Kazuyo asks them to throw it away the next day, but Kicchom seems to like the coat very much. He even curls up and naps on it, but finally it is put in a plastic bag and is packed away for the night. A windstorm rages that night, and in the morning when the family goes out to check the devastation, they see that their end of the road is completely clean and rid of debris. Even Kazuyo's precious flowers survived it unharmed. However, she finds the coat on the hanger, and panics. She throws it away again. When they want to set off, Kouji misses his bus, and the umbrella holder falls over when Bunta and Anko go out the door. Later Kouji sees that the bus was in an accident, and Anko and Bunta are the only ones with an umbrella when it starts to rain. Anko tells it to Sho in school, who notes that everything went well, and she shouldn't be afraid, as it might as well be a Zashiki-warashi, a friendly deity or spirit who protects the house it dwells in and the others who live there. However, Anko says that she thought that Zashiki-warashi - warashi being an archaic word for child - took the form of children, but the coat and the footprints would very well match a grown man. Then Sho tells her about a slavic house spirit who takes the form of a large elderly man. When she gets home, she finds her mum completely freaked out by the coat, although it has saved her again by putting pillows on the ground to where she would fall down from the stairs. She demands that Kouji burns it somewhere, but is too afraid to stay at home until then and goes with him. The children and Kicchom also go with them. Kouji tries to drive in the pouring rain, but can hardly see anything in the darkness. They almost get hit by a truck, but the coat flies off, blocks the truck's headlight and prevent it from blinding Kouji so that Kouji could evade the crash last minute. Anko gets out of the car and sees the coat fly off. She smiles and says it was there to protect them all along. Monster Mansion; Anko, Reiko and Sho go visit Dream Park to check out the new hit attraction, Monster Mansion. Bunta wants to go with them and is allowed too, but he has to take a mobile phone with him. When they see the queue, they decide to spend their time enjoying other rides and come back for the Mansion later. It is almost closing time when they go in. Anko sits with Bunta, and Reiko with Sho behind them. They go through several rooms where books fall off and spirits are cooking cuisine in the kitchen, also familiar faces begin to appear. When they reach the ball room, a mysterious voice asks everyone if they want to participate in the Ball of 99 Monsters, which is about to begin. Anko is too scared, but Bunta waves that he wants to, and the voice tells him that he is accepted as the 100th participant of the Ball. They continue on the path, and see spirits dancing behind glass walls. Anko then sees Bunta's reflection on the glass become a spirit, but thinks she's hallucinating. When Bunta asks her what is wrong she calms him and turns back to the screen... and then Bunta disappears. Anko starts looking for him, alerting Sho, Reiko and the staff, but Bunta is nowhere to be found. They go back to the ball scene, and see him dancing with the spirits, slowly turning into one. Anko tries to go in but cannot, Sho tells her that the ball is probably CG. He realizes Bunta has a phone, so they call him from Sho's. Anko blackmails him to come out or she will tell their mum, and so Bunta says he's quitting and is ported back into the real world. Anko bursts into tears and admits that had they left the phone at home, she might have lost Bunta forever. You've got a Hand on your Back Sho tells a story about an out-of-body experience. As he left his body every night, he could move more and more easier and fly farther and farther away. One night he went too far and lost control. Just when he began to fear he might never be able to return to his body, a voice told him if he floats on he won't be able to return and pushes his back. The next morning when he wakes up, his back hurts and when he goes to see himself in the mirror, he sees a palm print on his back. Sho ends the story by saying I was very fortunate to be able to return to my body, but still... whose hand could it have been?
12	"The Changeling: Let's Go Together: Eye Spy a Heated Table"; Transliteration: "Torikaerareta Akachan: Isshou ni Ikou: Shokudou no Kotatsu" (Japanese: とりかえられた赤ちゃん: いっしょにいこう: 食堂のこたつ)	February 9, 2010
In this episode the meals are presented by a Cyclops. The Changeling; Mari's little sister is born, so she invites the others over to celebrate with her and her family. Ako, Reiko and Yuuma start wandering what they should bring as a gift for the newborn. Ako suggests a protective charm, but Yuuma tells her no-one passes that as a gift. Ako then asks Sho whether he knows about any related customs from overseas. Sho suggests a metal spoon, and when the others look at him puzzled, he tells them about a story he just read. It is a tale from Norway about a married couple raising their newborn son near the fields. They lived merrily and loved each other, making a black fairy, who lived nearby, utterly jealous. When the couple left the house for a short while, the fairy came and looked at their son. He found his face and his giggle so cute, that he decided to swap him with his own child. So when the mother called out to her son asking whether he was hungry, she found the changeling child instead. She ran out yelling 'he has a moustache', and his husband wondered why the child had the face of an adult. When it started crying, and they offered it some milk to drink, the changeling demanded beer and snacks. The parents then decided to consult the elder of the village. When the elder and other townspeople arrived, they too were astonished. The elder asked them whether the cradle has always been put to where it was now, and when the parents confirmed, he looked near the cradle and found the hair of the fairy. He then told them about the envious black fairy who's been living in the area, and that he had probably switched children with them. When the parents asked him about the fate of their own child, he told them not to worry, as the fairies treasure him in return. They asked the elder for a way to get their own child back, who told them to smear the changeling's feet with oil, and light fire near them, so that the scared parents would come for it. They lit the fire, and the black fairy appeared stating that humans are cruel. His child replied that so was him for leaving him with them, and they left talking about beer. The parents got their own child back, thanked the elder, who told them that fairies hate metal, and that they should always keep a metal spoon near the child. Sho tells the others that it's not impossible that similar fairies may exist in Japan, too. Eventually they brought sweets and treats with them, as metal spoons proved to be surprisingly expensive. When they arrive to Mari's house, they hear someone ask for beer, and the fairy tale comes to their minds right away. However, it turns out to be one of Mari's adult relatives. Let's go together The family visits Anko in the hospital, who's still sulking about not being able to go to Hokkaido. She wakes up at the middle of the night, complaining that she shouldn't have drunk that much juice. While wandering about, the lights flicker, and Ako sees light coming from one of the rooms. She goes there to check it, and is seen by a boy who invites her in. She asks him why he's still up, and introduces herself. Then she sees a bandage on his throat, and realizes that he probably cannot speak. He shows her a picture book of Hokkaido, when Ako tells him she was supposed to go there with her family. The boy forms an x with his fingers asking if it was canceled, and Ako tells him it was because her cold got worse. She tells him she wanted to go skiing. Then he shows her pictures of it, and Ako cheers enthusiastically. Then she hears footsteps, but the nurse passes them by and walks on. The next day she returns to check if he was awake, the lights flicker again and she finds the boy in his room. When he shows her more pictures of distant lands, Ako tells him she'd like to visit them. The boy then hands Ako a message saying let's go together. When Ako is surprised, he adds when we get healthy. Ako agrees. She keeps visiting the boy, waking up at 2 AM every day. However, her health deteriorates doing so, still she couldn't resist wanting to see him. In the meantime, the doctor tells her father that they cannot discharge her, as her cardiopulmonary functions suddenly dropped for an unknown reason. When the doctor tells them that Ako's life is in danger, and there is nothing else to be done than wait, the parents panic. It's 2 AM again, and Ako takes off her oxygen mask to go see the boy. Her mother sleeps on beside her bed, unable to stop her. The lights flicker, and Ako staggers on to meet the boy. Upon entering his room, Ako now finds a forest with white, leafless trees and a gray sky, where the boy stands with his bandage loose. He calls out for Ako, who remarks that he can now talk again, and invites her to go together with him. He tells her that now they can go see anything they want, from mountains to seas. He reaches out to her, and Ako, half-conscious, agrees to go together, and she starts walking towards the boy. Then, hearing her mother calling out to her, she turns around. Her mother is screaming desperately at a nurse that her daughter went missing from her room. The nurse tells her to stay where she is, while she will alert the staff to go look for Ako. Ako, however, doesn't seem to recognize her situation, turns away and walks on. Remembering her smile and seeing her mother's despair, the boy withdraws his hand just before Ako could place hers in it. He tells her to go back, and that she cannot come with him, and darts off as fast as he can. The trees turn black as he runs, and Ako, still staggering after him, tries to remember his name. She is then found by her mother, and collapses. While her mother holds her, she sees a flash of him, standing in the waves, looking at her. She then found out that the room she was visiting had been used by a boy, who died after an unsuccessful throat surgery. Hearing that he has always wanted a friend, before being discharged, Ako goes to the room saying goodbye. Eye Spy a Heated Table Ako tells a story about her dad, coming across a small shelter house in the forest. Hungry, he enters the house, greets the chef and spots a kotatsu, exclaiming how nostalgic it is. He asks for a maitake soba, and lifts the sheets of the kotatsu, just to see a pair of hairy knees with a pair of pink eyes staring back at him. He gets freaked out, and tells the chef what he saw, who replies 'Oh really? Were those legs.. just like these?', pulling up his pants, revealing the furry knees with their eyes blinking. Ako's father passes out, and later awakens to be found by a mountaineer, asking if he was all right. He says he could swear he saw a rest area there, and is told that there never was one. The man tells him he might have been tricked by a tanuki, and that some living in that area are pretty clever. He sighs, and thinks loud, saying those legs were really freaky. Then the man asks him, 'you mean these?' , pulling up Ako's fathers' pants, revealing that now his knees have the brown fur and pink eyes on them. Once again he passes out, with a silhouette of a kitsune with glowing eyes standing in front of him. Ako ends the story by saying my dad's really easy to trick, isn't he?
13	"Path of the Dead: Mirror from the Sea: Nailed Down at Night: Cake"; Transliteration: "Mouja Michi: Umi ni Tadayotteita Kagami: Ushi no Kokumairi: Keeki" (Japanese: 亡者道: 海にただよっていた鏡: 丑の刻まいり: ケーキ)	February 16, 2010
In this episode the meals are presented by the Gastly Widow. Path of the Dead; Ako wins a contest and the reward is a trip with her family to a newly renovated seaside bed and breakfast. While on the train, they cheer on how good it will be to eat seafood, and enjoy the newly reopened accommodation. They stand in front of a beautiful house, but then Kouji takes another look at the map, and tells them it's not the place. They arrive at a run-down apartment, and meet the sickly landlady and her husband, who tells her wife to go back to sleep and let him manage this for her. They follow him to the stairs on the squeaky wooden floor, when Anko's mom says she was told that the house was renovated. The landlord tells her that the second floor in deed was, when they added a new room. Anko pouts and murmurs that it's not renovation but construction, but the landlord says that it's a beautiful and clean room that no-one has ever used before them. When they enter the room, Kouji tries to be polite and says it is nice and big, whereas Kazuyo says that the view must be beautiful, too. But when she opens the window, all she sees is a temple and a cemetery. Bunta is hungry, so his dad asks the landlord to prepare dinner, however, he apologizes and gives them coupons, as his wife will not be able to make dinner being this ill. They go out to eat at a restaurant, and while Ako complains about not getting to eat any seafood, Bunta tells her he's just as happy with hamburgers. Kouji returns with bad news; every other accommodation is full, they will have to stay for the night in the apartment. When they return Ako stops for a moment, and sighs. Then someone asks her if her family is staying in that room, and she sees an old monk in black robe approaching. He asks her which room they are staying at, and when Ako points at their room, the monk tells her to leave right away. Ako replies that they have nowhere else to go for the night, the monk offers her to stay at his temple. Ako refuses, but the monk hands her a protective charm saying it will surely come in handy. When they get to sleep, Ako wakes up hearing footsteps. She wakes Bunta up to ask if he had heard them too, but Bunta shrugs her off. The steps are getting louder, and Ako hides under her blanket. Then she starts hearing moans too, and sees white, transparent feet walking in front of her, just to vanish after stepping through something. She tries to hide and stay quiet, but one of the spirits spot her and look under her blanket. Anko throws her blanket off, screaming, and she sees that she's the only one who can move. The uncanny white figures draw closer, and one of them reaches out to Anko. She flails with the charm she got from the monk, repelling them, and then tries to free Bunta who is being dragged by the spirits. She touches everyone with her charm to free their bodies, but they are surrounded. Not being able to touch them, the spirits lift the blanket and start carrying the whole family on top with them, when an angry landlady opens the door. She asks them what they think they are doing to her guests, and tells them to take their hands off of them. She then sees them through an enormous black hole on the wall, bows, and goes through herself. An ambulance is in front of the apartment, and the next day the monk tells the family that the landlady has died. He tells them that they were attacked by the spirits of the dead. He also explains that these grounds were execution sites for prisoners during the Edo era, and the dead have walked the Path of the Dead towards the afterlife ever since. The path starts off from the temple, and heads west from there onwards to the sky. The room they stayed in is obstructing the path, and the monk has warned the owners beforehand. Anko then tells the monk that the landlady walked the path too, and the monk replied that she probably went there to protect them, and, already being severely ill, got dragged into the afterlife. Anko thanks her with gratitude. Mirror from the Sea; Anko tells Sho and Reiko at school how their vacation was ruined by crossing paths with the dead, and how she couldn't eat any seafood. Sho then shows her a tale which just sprang into his mind from mentioning the sea. Anko asks if it's a ghost story again, and Sho smiles. The story tells of a cruise ship caught up in a severe storm, which sank near the shore of a village. What remained of the ship, the cargo and the passengers' belongings was washed up on the shore for everyone to take. The villagers collected them, and shared them amongst themselves. While scavenging and salvaging, an old man fished a beautiful mirror out of the sea, and asked the others to let him have it, and take it home for his granddaughter named Sophie, who lost her parents and was raised by him. He got the mirror and put it on Sophie's wall, who was overjoyed. When Sophie was brushing her hair in front of the mirror, she saw water dripping from the glass. She tried to wipe it off with her sleeves, but it kept leaking water. She told her grandfather that it was just as if the mirror was crying endlessly, he replied it must be because of the weather. She replied that it was winter, but her grandpa answered that the weather was a bit different near the coast. That night Sophie saw water spilling through the mirror again. When she started wiping it with a piece of cloth, she saw a ghoulish face flash behind the surface. She dropped the cloth, and the face vanished. The next day Sophie brought home a new dress she had made for the village festival. She wanted to see herself in the mirror, but it became cloudy again. When she tried to wipe the dew away, she once again saw the figure of a woman, but this time, she reached through the mirror and grabbed Sophie's shoulders. Her grandfather came to her rescue, shoving the woman's hands off of her, and grabbed a chair to break the mirror with it, but it flew right through it. The woman began slowly climbing out through the mirror, but then her grandpa threw the mirror face down on the ground, until it stopped shaking. But when they thought they were finally safe, the woman appeared in another mirror above them. She came out of it, and pushed Sophie's grandfather away. While Sophie was looking at him worried, the woman's hand came creeping out of a hand mirror on the ground. She climbed out of it, told Sophie to 'give it back' , and vanished in a strong breeze through the window. When Sophie looked around, the mirror was gone. In the morning they saw a long trail leading from the house towards the sea, and Sophie's grandpa told her it was probably the owner of the mirror, who grew so jealous seeing Sophie's beauty, that she came to take her mirror back. Sho then tells that the same ship is still underwater, while the skeleton of the woman is shown watching herself in the mirror. Reiko exclaims that it's a fictional story and is completely cliché. However, when washing her hands in the bathroom, she sees water drops in the mirror... Nailed Down at Night; Anko tells the story of a man, who always took his sweet time returning home. One day he was late again, and decided to take the shortcut through the temple. It was 2 AM, the hour of the Ox, and when he went up the stairs, he heard a loud banging noise. Then he saw a woman wearing three candles on her head nailing a straw doll with a picture on it to the tree. He became frightened and ran home. The next morning he went back to the temple, and told the monk what he saw. They found the doll, and were astonished to find his picture on it. He asked if he was cursed and was going to die, but the monk told him he was in no danger. If someone sees the person putting on the curse, it falls on the caster instead. The man asked 'who would possibly want to curse me', when his phone rang; he was told that his wife died in a heart attack. Ako ends the story by saying Yes, the one nailing the doll and cursing him was none other than his own wife. Ending: Cake A girl named Katarina brought a cake for her grandma, who lived in the forest. However, she got hungry on the way, and ate the cake herself. She put a stone into the basket, gave it to her grandma and ran off. That night, she heard a voice calling out her name. She thought it was her grandma and she was angry, so she hid under her blanket. The voice said 'Katarina, I am standing at the front door.' The front door creaked open. 'Katarina, I am coming up the stairs.' Then the voice said 'Katarina, I am right in front of your room now.' 'Katarina, I am standing at your bed now.' Then Katarina peaked out from under the blankets...
14	"Return My Body: Replay"; Transliteration: "Watashi wo Kaeshite: Ripurei" (Japanese: わたしをかえして: リプレイ)	March 2, 2010
In this episode the meals are presented by Noro-chan and Wara-chan. Return my body One night, Ako noticed a strange wart on her right shoulders. It wasn't painful, but it was growing bigger and bigger steadily. A few days later, Ako wakes up because someone is calling to her; when there apparently is no one else in her room, she calls out to the source of the voice, only to discover that the 'wart' grew a face with her features, and was talking to her. Ako first tries to go through the day without anyone noticing this, but Kicchom keeps barking at her, and Bunta too is curious about her behaviour. She then runs off to school, and later she is seen doing garden duties. When she is grumpy about it, the 'wart' tells her that it is unfair that her classmates force it onto her. Sho shows up right behind her, and when he leaves, the 'wart' remarks how close they are, but a flustered Ako silences it. In class, the teacher is asking who would volunteer for garden duties, and Reiko suggests that Ako should do it again. But the 'wart' speaks up instead of her, refusing to do it and suggesting that everyone takes their turns. Even Mari apologises for leaving it all to Ako, and praises her for standing up to Reiko. When Reiko too acts assertive, Ako praises the 'wart' and they decide to somehow make it work. However, next morning Ako wakes up being the 'wart' on her own shoulder, as the being took over her body. When Kicchom barks again, she hits him, and when her family asks her about not wearing glasses, she says she was 'reborn'. Sho is doing the garden duty that day, and fake Ako flirts with him, and grabs his hand when a bee flies near her. Then she volunteers to solve a problem at the blackboard, and says she will get higher results than Reiko on the next test - if she does, she will become the class president instead. Reiko accepts the challenge, and Ako tries to call out to Sho's subconscious raising his suspicion. At sunset, the being threatens Ako to rub her against a shrine tree, which would make her disappear. In the nick of time, Sho appears and identifies the being as a Jinmensou, or Wartface demon. It then attacks Shou, who releases a bee that stings the demon, popping it off of Ako. Sho tells Ako that he followed her since school, since she was acting weird. He also tells her that as long as she has an unyielding confidence and fighting spirit, it will not be able to come back. Replay; Reiko tells the story of a boy, who once played an unusual video game, offering him meals as reward upon completion. He chose Replay Burger, and then the program tells him to say 'Replay' whenever he would like to change something that had just happened. The boy exploits this to the fullest; he rewrites his tests after getting to know all the questions, replays the night if he wanted to sleep more, and rewinds to Sunday countless times to play more football. But one day, he decides to climb atop Ghastly Apartments, an old run-down building. His friend opts out seeing the shabby fire escape, but he goes regardless. But when he steps on the last step, the structure collapses. He says 'Replay', but he cannot wind back past that fateful last step... Reiko ends the story by saying He kept screaming replay how many times, ten thousand, a million, maybe a billion... and he still keeps repeating.. 'Replay'. Ending: The carpenter's wife There was once a castle, and within the castle was a hidden room; it was so secret, that everyone who built it was killed afterwards. The carpenter responsible for building the bridge of the room was buried alive, and his wife became so maddened with grief that she hung herself from the banister. One stormy night, a samurai was crossing the bridge when he heard a quiet voice saying 'Return my husband to me'. The samurai turned towards the voice, and saw a round, glowing object on a banister. He went to take a closer look...
15	"It was you: I Can't Dance Without You: Empty Seat"; Transliteration: "Omaeda: Hitori de wa Odorenai no: Kuuseki" (Japanese: おまえだ: ひとりではおどれないの: 空席)	March 9, 2010
In this episode the meals are presented by Baku. It was you Ako and Sho go visit an abandoned library, and bump into Reiko. Sho then tells them that, according to the occult, books can have their own spirit, to which Reiko retorts they are just paper and ink. A book then falls off the shelf seemingly by itself, and when they check it they see it is about clairvoyance. Shou says it wanted them to read it, Reiko protests that it was just a coincidence but Ako already found a page about finding your future love. It says one must hold a comb in the mouth, look at a water surface and the image of their future spouse would be reflected, if done at the Hour of the Ox. Reiko remarks everyone would be doing it if it worked, but when she wakes up at night to find the book in her room, she decides to see for herself. While waiting for the reflection to appear, she almost gives up, but then she is startled by the image that forms on the surface - she accidentally breaks a mirror, and the razor-sharp shards fall into the water... I can't dance without you Everyone is staring at the poster for a new ballet performance, talking about how important good chemistry between the dancers is. However, a tight relationship might lead to dire consequences, explains Sho with a rigid complexion. He tells the tale of Sylvia and Andre, two young Bulgarian ballet performers who had been dancing together from an early age. They gained the silver trophy of an important competition near the Aegean sea, and promised to train day and night to win next time. One night while practicing, a loose chandelier fell from the ceiling. To save her love from certain death, Sylvia pushed Andre away and she herself got caught under the chandelier, falling into a coma. Andre ditched ballet afterwards, but was convinced by his trainer to dance for Sylvia's sake. He teamed up with a girl, and actually won the gold trophy this time, but he felt nothing but emptiness. That night, when Sylvia's mother stood vigilant by her side, a sudden gust of wind blew the curtains open. Sylvia opened her eyes, stood up and went to the window, to see Andre dance in the full moon. She called out to him, and he clasped her hand and pulled her into the moonlit night sky, to dance with him among the stars. When Sylvia's mother woke up, she found her daughter passed, smiling... and later it turned out that Andre passed away that same night too. Empty seat Ako tells the story of a girl, who just couldn't wait to start high school. She was accepted into an all girl school, and was raring to get to the opening ceremony. She wasn't paying enough attention, and was hit by a truck at the intersection, dying on the spot. By the time the school was notified, the opening ceremony could not be called off. But the students were not notified of the accident, and only the immediate classmates were told why there was an empty seat in their room. But when the teacher was about to say she could not make it, the empty seat started shaking furiously, and then fell. Ako ends the story saying Kayo really was looking forward to being there, didn't she... Ending: The Ruins; One late evening, a man was hopelessly lost in the forest, when he happened upon old stone ruins. When he entered the ruins, he heard marching. *thump thump, crackle crackle* The odd sounds were headed towards the ruins. He then remembered an old battle that was fought there, and that they said it was still fought by the dead. *thump thump, crackle crackle* It sounded like clanking bones! The man turned around, and then saw them...
16	"Your Beloved's Lock of Hair: Spooky Tunnel: School Spirit"; Transliteration: "Sukina Hito no Kami no Ke wo...: Yuurei Tonneru: Gakkou Warashi" (Japanese: すきな人の髪の毛を...: 幽霊トンネル: 学校わらし)	April 13, 2010
17	"Test of Courage: Welcome Home: Beautiful Palm"; Transliteration: "Kimodameshi: Okaeri, Anata!: Sugoi Tesou" (Japanese: きもだめし: おかえり、あなた!: すごい手相)	April 20, 2010
18	"Possessed: Rebirth: Loving Ghost"; Transliteration: "Tsukimono: Umarekawari: Kosodate Yuurei" (Japanese: 憑き物: 生まれ変わり: 子育て幽霊)	April 27, 2010
19	"Guide to the Afterlife: The Demon's Window: Weeping Bell"; Transliteration: "Ano Yo no Tabi no Goannai: Akuma no Mado: Naku Tsurigane" (Japanese: あの世の旅のご案内: 悪魔の窓: 泣くつり鐘)	May 4, 2010
20	"The Television from Space: A Nightmare in Yamazakura"; Transliteration: "Yogen Terebi no Kai: Akumu no Tsuzuki" (Japanese: 予言テレビの怪: 悪夢の続き)	May 11, 2010
21	"That Arm: One Stormy Night"; Transliteration: "Ude: Arashi no Yoru" (Japanese: うで: あらしの夜)	May 25, 2010
22	"The Doppelganger Returns: Cursed Goods"; Transliteration: "Mou Hitori no Sensei: Kombini no Noroi Guzzu" (Japanese: もうひとりの先生: コンビニののろいグッズ)	June 1, 2010
23	"Thriller Restaurant's First Guest"; Transliteration: "Kaidan Resutoran Saisho no Kyaku" (Japanese: 怪談レストラン最初の客)	June 8, 2010

== Music ==
=== Anime series ===
The ending theme is "Lost Boy", performed by SEAMO.

== References to mythology and modern culture ==
- In episode three, "Passenger on a Rainy Night" is about a girl getting a taxi ride to her house, where she is revealed to already be dead. This is a version of an urban legend, where a person (usually a young woman) gets a ride from the place of her death to an address, usually the house of a relative or close friend.

== Video games ==
Two video game adaptations were released for Nintendo DS on June 3, 2010 and June 30, 2011, respectively.
