= Christopher Robbins =

British writer and journalist (1946–2012)

- Born: 19 November 1946; Bristol, England, U.K.
- Died: 24 December 2012 (aged 66); London, England, U.K.
- Occupation: Writer
- Spouse: Mary Agnes Donoghue (m. 1996)
- Writing career
- Period: 1963–2012
- Genres: non-fiction; military history

Christopher Robbins (19 November 1946 – 24 December 2012) was a British writer and journalist. He is best known for his 1978 bestseller Air America, a non-fiction book which was made into a film in 1990. It is about the secret airline run by the CIA for covert operations during the Vietnam War.

== Life ==
Christopher Robbins was born on 19 November 1946, in Bristol, where he grew up and attended Taunton School. A gifted schoolboy, he started working for free on the Evening World and then the Evening Post. At the age of sixteen he won a talent competition and become "junior jazz critic" for The Daily Telegraph another Bristol local newspaper. He later specialized in investigative work—especially about the CIA—writing pieces for the Observer Magazine.

During the 1970s, prior to the publication of his bestseller, Robbins was just a freelance journalist, unable to pay off all his debts or pay the rent.

In 2008, In Search of Kazakhstan: The Land that Disappeared (also published as Apples Are from Kazakhstan) won the Dolman Best Travel Book Award. Another book of his, The Empress of Ireland won the Saga Award for wit.

Robbins wrote for many newspapers and magazines both in Europe and the US, spending most of the last years working as a journalist and scriptwriter.

He died of pancreatic cancer on 24 December 2012.

== Books ==
- Assassin: a terrifying true story (1977)
- Air America (Corgi, 1988) ISBN 0-552-12821-X
  - Air America: The Story of the CIA's Secret Airlines (Hardcover – 1 January 1978)
  - Air America: The Explosive Inside Story Of The CIA's Supersecret Airline (1979)
  - Air America: From WWII to Vietnam: The Explosive True Story of the Cia's Secret Airline (Paperback – 15 January 1988)
  - Air America: The True Story of the C.I.A.'s Mercenary Fliers in Covert Operations from Pre-war China to Present Day Nicaragua (Corgi, new edition, January 1991) ISBN 0-552-13722-7 ISBN 978-0552137225
  - Air America From World War II to Vietnam (Paperback – 2003)
- The Test of Courage: Michel Thomas (1999)
- The Ravens: Pilots of the Secret War of Laos (Asia Books Co., 2000) ISBN 974-8303-41-1
- The Empress of Ireland: A Chronicle of an Unusual Friendship (2005) ISBN 9781560257097
- Apples Are from Kazakhstan: The Land That Disappeared (London: Profile Books, 2007) ISBN 9780977743384

== Filmography ==
- Air America (1990) The plot is adapted from Christopher Robbins' 1979 non-fiction book, chronicling the US Central Intelligence Agency-financed airline during the Vietnam War to transport weapons and supplies within Laos and other areas of Indochina subsequent to the North Vietnamese invasion of Laos. The publicity for the film—advertised as a light-hearted buddy movie—implied a tone that differs greatly from that of the actual film, which includes such serious themes as an anti-war message, a focus on the opium trade, and a negative portrayal of Royal Laotian General Vang Pao (played by actor Burt Kwouk as "General Lu Soong").
- The Legendary Brian Desmond Hurst (2005)
