= The Buddy System (film) =

1984 film by Glenn Jordan

- Theatrical release poster by Tom Jung
- Directed by: Glenn A. Jordan
- Written by: Mary Agnes Donoghue
- Produced by: Alain Chammas
- Starring: Richard Dreyfuss; Susan Sarandon; Nancy Allen; Jean Stapleton
- Cinematography: Matthew F. Leonetti
- Edited by: Arthur Schmidt
- Music by: Patrick Williams
- Distributed by: 20th Century Fox
- Release date: January 20, 1984
- Running time: 110 minutes
- Country: United States
- Language: English
- Box office: $1,820,049 (domestic)

The Buddy System is a 1984 American romantic comedy film starring Richard Dreyfuss, Susan Sarandon, Nancy Allen, Wil Wheaton and Jean Stapleton. The film was directed by Glenn A. Jordan who is better known for directing and producing numerous television films and television dramas. The film follows the story of a cautious single mother who forms an unlikely friendship with her son's school security guard. The Buddy System was Wil Wheaton's first major film role and his second non-television role after the 1983 film Hambone and Hillie.

== Plot ==
Emily Price is a single mother: she got pregnant in high school and was abandoned by the father before her son, Tim, was born. She and Tim live with her mother, who is both protective and disparaging, and tends to overlook her daughter in favor of her grandson. She is trying to become a court reporter, but freezes up every time she takes the test.

Joe comes into their lives when he is sent out to do a residency check by the school: Emily and Tim have been lying about where they live so he can go to a better school. The price for Tim is loneliness: he can't tell anyone where he lives. Joe, who is an aspiring novelist and an inventor of gadgets, decides not to report them and strikes up an unlikely friendship with Tim that gradually escalates to include Emily as well. Previous romantic entanglements - for Emily, the withholding Jim; for Joe, the beautiful but self-absorbed Carrie - intervene while Emily gains courage and independence and Joe comes to understand where his real talents lie.

== Cast ==
- Richard Dreyfuss as Joe
- Susan Sarandon as Emily Price
- Nancy Allen as Carrie
- Jean Stapleton as Mrs. Price
- Wil Wheaton as Tim Price
- Edward Winter as Jim Parks
- Keene Curtis as Dr. Knitz
- Milton Selzer as Landlord
- F. William Parker as Lawyer

== See also ==
- 1984 in film
- Cinema of the United States
- List of American films of 1984
