= Blue City (novel) =

1947 thriller by Ross Macdonald

- Front cover first edition
- Author: Ross Macdonald
- Language: English
- Published: 1947
- Publication place: United States

Blue City is a thriller written in 1947 by Ross Macdonald. The novel was originally released under his real name, Kenneth Millar, by Alfred A. Knopf, while a condensed version was serialized in the August and September 1950 issues of Esquire.

One of the novel's earliest translations was into Russian as a 1972 serialization in the literary review Znamaya, where what was perceived to be its exposure of the common cause between capitalism and the gangster ethic was greatly appreciated. Later versions appeared in Italian (1975), Greek (1995), and Portuguese (2000). In 1986, after Macdonald's death, the novel was "very freely" adapted to the disastrous film named after it.

== Background ==
Publicity for Macdonald's hardboiled third novel, Blue City, linked the author's name with James M. Cain, Dashiell Hammett and Raymond Chandler, a comparison deprecated in the mixed reviews that the book received at the time, although The Chicago Sun noted that at least it was in a completely different league from Mickey Spillane. Macdonald himself later affirmed in an interview that Hammett had been a particularly strong influence on him: "I imagine I might never have written hard-boiled detective stories at all if it hadn't been for Hammett". Others have commented on the likeness between Macdonald's 'Blue City' and the 'Poisonville' of Hammett's Red Harvest.

The portrayal of the novel's unnamed Mid-Western small town, lying in the shadow of Chicago, is centered mostly on the disadvantaged who live in it and differs from the up-market California scenarios of Macdonald's later Lew Archer novels. In a 1952 letter to his publisher, he explained that he had in mind "a town where I had suffered, and several of the characters were based on people I hated." It is from this that the book's anger and political stance derive. The protagonist is narrator throughout, but will occasionally diverge from talking tough into what Macdonald's biographer describes as "civics lectures" or he overdoes literary reference. The particular target of his anger is small-town pettifoggery. The self-congratulatory tabloid editorial justifying anti-union violence or the list of books suppressed in the library from which "it was somehow comforting to know that the good people of the town … were protected against the lubricity of Rabelais, the immorality of Flaubert, the viciousness of Hemingway, and the degradation of Faulkner."

Reviewing the book, Nelson Algren praised the over-all clipped descriptive style: "Kenneth Millar never uses two words when one will do; and when he wants you to see a thing, you see it." A later commentator looked beyond thriller conventions and discovered that "Millar wanted to do in prose what jazzmen did in music". Here he was only following Macdonald himself, who had said in an earlier interview that "the imagery and rhythm and movements of jazz had a lot to do with forming my style in my early books. It's quite obvious in a book like Blue City." He also noted then that Jack Kerouac's "jazz-prose" was written later and more diffusely. There was no direct influence.

== Plot ==
Twenty-two-year-old John Weather has returned from the army, having served in the European Theater in the Second World War, only to find his estranged father had been shot two years previously. John had known his father as a prominent businessman and politician and now learns that he was a leading factor in the corruption of the town. Everyone seems more than happy to let his murder remain unsolved and, as John tries to uncover the murderer, he finds himself up against and manhandled by thugs in the pay of Roger Kerch. Kerch is a blackmailer who has taken over his father's slot machine franchise and seems to have a hold over his step-mother, Floraine, whom his father had married while John was young and living away from home.

Finally, with the help of Carla, a hostess at the Cathay Club, John gets ahead of those trying to prevent him uncovering the truth. After Kerch has killed his step-mother (who turns out to be Kerch's bigamous wife), and John is in line to inherit his father's assets, he gains the co-operation of Ralph Hanson, the police inspector in charge of the case, and Freeman Allister, the ineffectual reformist mayor. Kerch and his surviving associates are jailed, while Allister, the real murderer of John's father, is shot by his mistress.

== Bibliography ==
- Paul Nelson, Kevin Avery, It's All One Case: The Illustrated Ross Macdonald Archives, Fantagraphics Books, 2016
- Tom Nolan, Ross MacDonald: A Biography, Simon and Schuster 1999
