= Mary Agnes Donoghue =

American screenwriter and director

- Born: March 26, 1943 (age 81); Queens, New York City
- Occupation(s): Screenwriter, director, producer
- Spouse: Christopher Robbins (m. 1996; died 2012)

Mary Agnes Donoghue (26 March 1943 in Queens) is an American screenwriter and director. Following early jobs as a secretary and short story writer, Donoghue's first writing credit was the 1984 film The Buddy System. She went on to pen the screenplays for Beaches (1988) and Paradise (1991), which was also her directorial debut. Donoghue co-wrote and co-produced Deceived (1991) and two years later, her first play, Me and Mamie O'Rourke, made its debut at the Strand Theatre in London. In the 2000s, Donoghue wrote the screenplay for White Oleander (2002) and co-wrote Veronica Guerin (2003) with Carol Doyle. In 2013, Donoghue wrote and directed Jenny's Wedding.

== Early and personal life ==
Donoghue was born in Queens, New York City. Before becoming a screenwriter, she worked various secretarial jobs. Donoghue was also a short story writer and poet. Donoghue lived with her partner, writer and journalist Chris Robbins for 19 years, before marrying him in 1996. Robbins died on December 24, 2012, from pancreatic cancer.

== Career ==
Donoghue's first writing credit was the 1984 romantic comedy drama The Buddy System, starring Richard Dreyfuss and Susan Sarandon. Donoghue then adapted Iris Rainer Dart's 1985 novel Beaches for the screen. The film which starred Bette Midler and Barbara Hershey was released in 1988. During filming, the director Garry Marshall asked Donoghue to add "a couple more sugars" to the script. When she refused, Marshall fired her and hired a team of comedy writers to change the script. After three weeks, the head of the studio saw the script, which was described as being "really, really bad" and Donoghue's script was reinstated.

Donoghue wrote the screenplay for the 1991 film Paradise, which was based on the 1987 French film Le Grand Chemin. Paradise also marked Donoghue's directorial debut. Donoghue said she learned that directing was not as easy as she thought it would be. In the same year, Donoghue co-wrote and co-produced Deceived with Derek Saunders. Donoghue described how the film came to her; "You're sitting there at night and look over at your husband or your wife and think: Who is this person? I was fascinated by the idea of having a middle-class safe existence, predictable; and then certain events take place that let you know that you know nothing about your own life and the people in it."

Two years later, Donoghue wrote her first play titled Me and Mamie O'Rourke. The play was staged at the Strand Theatre and starred British comedians Dawn French and Jennifer Saunders. It received mixed reviews from critics. In the 2000s, Donoghue wrote the screenplay for White Oleander (2002). Producer John Wells enlisted Donoghue to adapt White Oleander from the novel of the same name by Janet Fitch. Wells wanted the story to be presented on-screen as fully as possible. Donoghue also co-wrote Veronica Guerin (2003) with Carol Doyle. The biographical film focuses on the life of Irish journalist Veronica Guerin, who was murdered in 1996. Donoghue called the film "a story about personal courage."

Donoghue wrote, directed and produced Jenny's Wedding starring Katherine Heigl. Production wrapped in November 2013, but a crowd funding campaign was launched in February 2014 to help raise post-production finishing money.

== Filmography ==
- The Buddy System (1984)
- Beaches (1988)
- Paradise (1991) – Also director
- Deceived (1991) – Co-written with Derek Saunders and co-produced
- White Oleander (2002)
- Veronica Guerin (2003) – Co-written with Carol Doyle
- Jenny's Wedding (2015) – Also director and producer

== See also ==
- List of female film and television directors
- List of LGBT-related films directed by women
