= Komimasa Tanaka =

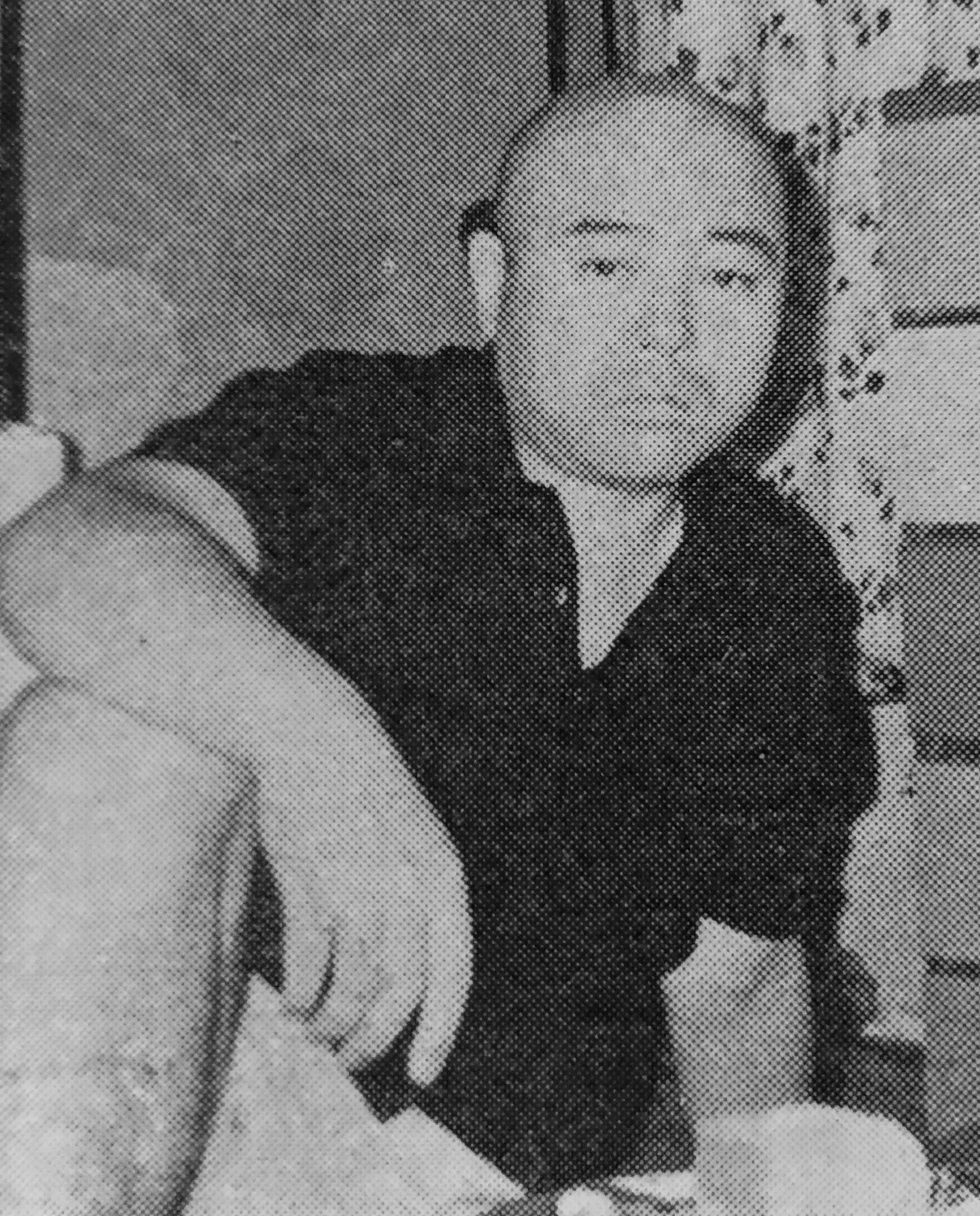
- Born: 2 April 1925
- Died: 27 February 2000
- Occupations: Writer, prosaist, essayist
- Writing career
- Language: Japanese language

Komimasa Tanaka (田中 小実昌, Tanaka Komimasa; April 29, 1925–February 29, 2000) was a noted Japanese writer, essayist, and translator.

== Prizes ==
- 1979 81st Naoki Prize (1979上) for Rōkyoku shiasahimaru no hanashi / Mimi no koto (浪曲師朝日丸の話 / ミミのこと)
- 1979 15th Tanizaki Prize for Poroporo (ポロポロ)

== Selected works ==
- Kaburitsuki jinsei, 1964.
- Ueno shōgitai, 1968.
- Jidōmakidokei no ichinichi, 1971.
- Omoshiro hambun taidan, 1971.
- Otomejima no otome, 1974.
- Ohōtsuku zuma, 1975.
- Cheri to no sampo, 1976.
- Betonamu ōjo, 1979.
- Biggu heddo, 1979.
- Gorinjū totokarucho, 1979.
- Ishagirai ni sasageru hon, 1979.
- Poroporo (ポロポロ), Tōkyō : Chūō Kōronsha, 1979.
- Rōkyoku shiasahimaru no hanashi / Mimi no koto (浪曲師朝日丸の話 / ミミのこと), 1979.
- Yashi no tabi (香具師 の 旅), Tōkyō : Tairyūsha, 1979.
- Joruigaku nyūmon, 1980.
- Mata yokomichi ni soremasu ga, 1981.
- Chōjikan taidan (超時間 対談), Tōkyō : Shūeisha, 1981.
- Yoi (酔), Tōkyō : Sakuhinsha, 1988.
- Boku no shinema gurafiti, Tōkyō : Shinchōsha, 1983.
- Nai mono no sonzai (ない もの の 存在), Tōkyō : Fukutake Shoten, 1990.
- Tanaka Komimasa essei korekushon (田中小実昌エッセイ・コレクション), Tåokyåo : Chikuma Shobåo, 2002.

== Selected translation works ==
- Carter Brown - The Dame, The Brazen, The Temptress, Tomorrow is Murder, The Stripper, The Bombshell, The Dream is Deadly, Zelda, The Lady is Available, The Girl Who Was Possessed, Nymph to the Slaughter, Charlie Sent Me, and more other works
- James M. Cain - The Postman Always Rings Twice
- Raymond Chandler - The Lady in the Lake, The High Window
- James Hadley Chase - Tiger By the Tail, Shock Treatment, You've Got It Coming, One Bright Summer Morning
- A.A. Fair - Bedrooms Have Windows, Some Women Won't Wait, You Can Die Laughing, Top of the Heap, Pass the Gravy, Owls Don't Blink, Bats Fly at Dusk, Double or Quits, Cats Prowl at Night, Crows Can't Count, Up for Grabs (Cool and Lam Series)
- Dashiell Hammett - Red Harvest
- Ross Macdonald - Blue City
- Richard Matheson - I Am A Legend
- Ed McBain - The Mugger, Lady Killer
- Mickey Spillane - Day of the Guns, Bloody Sunrise, The Death Dealers, The By-Pass Control
