= Miyoko Matsutani =

Japanese children's writer and novelist (1926–2015)

Miyoko Matsutani (松谷 みよ子; February 14, 1926 – February 28, 2015) was a Japanese picture book author and folktale researcher. She is best known for writing the book Taro the Dragon Boy.

== Early life and education ==
Matsutani was born in Tokyo, Japan on February 14, 1926. She was the youngest child of Yojiro Matsutani, a lawyer and politician. She was an avid reader. She graduated from high school in 1943. However, because her father died when she was 11 years old, her family could not afford to send her to college. Instead, she worked at a bank called Nihon Kangyō Ginkō and the Japan Travel Bureau. In 1945, during the Bombing of Tokyo that occurred during World War II, her family evacuated to the city of Nakano in Nagano prefecture. While there she met Jōji Tsubota, who mentored her as a writer.

== Career ==
Matsutani's first book was a collection of short stories called Kai ni natta kodomo (貝になった子供), which won an award. She married Takuo Segawa in 1955. Together they collected traditional legends of the Nagano area. This research eventually inspired her 1960 book Taro the Dragon Boy. It won the Hans Christian Andersen Award and was later adapted into a film. She was also well-known for her book Little Momo-chan (ちいさいモモちゃん, Chiisai Momo-chan), which was published in 1964. It won the Noma Prize for children's literature. She also edited the Kaidan Restaurant series.

Her books for young readers often focused on the relationship between mothers and children, while her books for older readers had a broader focus, touching upon social issues. The stories she wrote based on folktales were especially focused on the relationship between humans and nature.

Matsutani died of old age on February 28, 2015 in Tokyo.
