= Edgar Allan Poe Award for Best Short Story =

The Edgar Allan Poe Award for Best Short Story, established in 1951, is an annual American literary award, presented alongside other Edgar Awards.

The award is presented to stories between 1,000 and 22,000 words that have been published in a magazine, periodical, e-zine, or book-length anthology. Stories shorter than 1,000 words (i.e., mini- or flash fiction) or longer than 22,000 words are ineligible. Although the Edgar Awards do not have a flash fiction category, works considered too long for the Short Story Award may be eligible for the Edgar Allan Poe Award for Best Novel, Edgar Allan Poe Award for Best First Novel, or Edgar Allan Poe Award for Best Paperback Original.

The Edgar Allan Poe Award for Best Short Story winners are listed below.

== Winners ==
=== 1950s ===
1950s Best Short Story winners
Year	Author	Story	Result
1951	Lawrence Blochman	"Diagnosis: Homicide"	Winner
1952	John Collier	"Fancies and Goodnights"	Winner
1953	Philip MacDonald	"Something to Hide"	Winner
1954	Roald Dahl	"Someone Like You"	Winner
1955	Stanley Ellin	"The House Party"	Winner
1956	Philip MacDonald	"Dream No More"	Winner
1957	Stanley Ellin	"The Blessington Method"	Winner
1958	Gerald Kersh	"The Secret of the Bottle"	Winner
1959	William O'Farrell	"Over There, Darkness"	Winner

=== 1960s ===
1960s Best Short Story winners
Year	Author	Story	Result
1960	Roald Dahl	"The Landlady"	Winner
1961	John Durham	"Tiger"	Winner
1962	Avram Davidson	"Affair at Lahore Cantonment"	Winner
1963	David Ely	"The Sailing Club"	Winner
1964	Leslie Ann Brownrigg	"Man Gehorcht"	Winner
1965	Lawrence Treat	"H as in Homicide"	Winner
1966	Shirley Jackson	"The Possibility of Evil"	Winner
1967	Rhys Davies	"The Chosen One"	Winner
1968	Edward D. Hoch	"The Oblong Room"	Winner
1969	Warner Law	"The Man Who Fooled the World"	Winner

=== 1970s ===
1970s Best Short Story winners
Year	Author	Story	Result
1970	Joe Gores	"Goodbye, Pops"	Winner
1971	Margery Finn Brown	"In The Forests of Riga the Beasts Are Very Wild Indeed"	Winner
1972	Robert L. Fish	"Moonlight Gardener"	Winner
1973	Joyce Harrington	"The Purple Shroud"	Winner
1974	Harlan Ellison	"The Whimper of Whipped Dogs"	Winner
1975	Ruth Rendell	"The Fallen Curtain"	Winner
1976	Jesse Hill Ford	"The Jail"	Winner
1977	Etta Revesz	"Like a Terrible Scream"	Winner
1978	Thomas Walsh	"Chance After Chance"	Winner
1979	Barbara Owens	"The Cloud Beneath The Eaves"	Winner

=== 1980s ===
1980s Best Short Story winners
Year	Author	Story	Result
1980	Geoffrey Norman	"Armed and Dangerous"	Winner
1981	Clark Howard	"Horn Man"	Winner
1982	Jack Ritchie	"The Absence of Emily"	Winner
1983	Frederick Forsyth	"There Are No Snakes in Ireland"	Winner
1984	Ruth Rendell	"The New Girlfriend"	Winner
1985	Lawrence Block	"By Dawn's Early Light"	Winner
1986	John Lutz	"Ride the Lightning"	Winner
1987	Robert Sampson	"Rain in Pinton County"	Winner
1988	Harlan Ellison	"Soft Monkey"	Winner
1989	Bill Crenshaw	"Flicks"	Winner

=== 1990s ===
1990s Best Short Story winners and shortlists
Year	Author	Story	Publication	Result	Ref.
1990	Donald E. Westlake	"Too Many Crooks"	Playboy, 1989	Winner	
1990	Ruth Graviros	"Ted Bundy's Father"	Ellery Queen's Mystery Magazine, November 1989	Shortlist	
1990	Robert Halsted	"The Girl and the Gator"	Alfred Hitchcock Mystery Magazine, December 1989	Shortlist	
1990	Nancy Pickard	"Afraid All the Time"	Sisters in Crime	Shortlist	
1990	Stephen Wasylyk	"For Loyal Service"	Alfred Hitchcock Mystery Magazine, August 1989	Shortlist	
1991	Lynne Barrett	"Elvis Lives"	Ellery Queen's Mystery Magazine, September 1990	Winner	
1991	Lawrence Block	"Answers to Soldiers"	Playboy, 1990	Shortlist	
1991	Ed Gorman	"Prisoners"	New Crimes	Shortlist	
1991	Sue Grafton	"A Poison That Leaves No Trace"	Sisters in Crime 2	Shortlist	
1991	Clark Howard	"Challenge the Widow-Maker"	Ellery Queen's Mystery Magazine, August 1990	Shortlist	
1992	Wendy Hornsby	"Nine Sons"	Sisters in Crime 4	Winner	
1992	Doug Allyn	"Sleeper"	Ellery Queen's Mystery Magazine, May 1991	Shortlist	
1992	Lawrence Block	"A Blow for Freedom"	Playboy, October 1991	Shortlist	
1992	Liza Cody	"Spasmo"	A Classic English Crime	Shortlist	
1992	Susan Schwartz	"Dreaming in Black and White"	Psycho-Paths	Shortlist	
1993	Benjamin M. Schutz	"Mary, Mary, Shut the Door"	Deadly Allies	Winner	
1993	Doug Allyn	"Candles in the Rain"	Ellery Queen's Mystery Magazine, November 1992	Shortlist	
1993	Jo Bannister	"Howler"	Ellery Queen's Mystery Magazine, October 1992	Shortlist	
1993	Max Allan Collins	"Louise"	Deadly Allies	Shortlist	
1993	Gabrielle Kraft	"One Hit Wonder"	Sisters in Crime 5	Shortlist	
1994	Lawrence Block	"Keller's Therapy"	Playboy, May 1993	Winner	
1994	Doug Allyn	"The Ghost Show"	Ellery Queen's Mystery Magazine, December 1993	Shortlist	
1994	Harlan Ellison	"Mefisto in Onyx"	Omni, October 1993	Shortlist	
1994	Joseph Hansen	"McIntyre's Donald"	Bohannon's Country	Shortlist	
1994	Bruce Holland Rogers	"Enduring as Dust"	Danger in DC	Shortlist	
1995	Doug Allyn	"The Dancing Bear"	Alfred Hitchcock's Mystery Magazine, March 1994	Winner	
1995	Robert Barnard	"The Gentleman in the Lake"	Ellery Queen's Mystery Magazine, July 1994	Shortlist	
1995	Brenda Melton Burnham	"The Tennis Court"	Ellery Queen's Mystery Magazine, July 1994	Shortlist	
1995	Brendan DuBois	"The Necessary Brother"	Ellery Queen's Mystery Magazine, May 1994	Shortlist	
1995	Justin Scott	"An Eye for a Tooth"	Justice in Manhattan	Shortlist	
1996	Jean B. Cooper	"The Judge's Boy"	Ellery Queen's Mystery Magazine, August 1995	Winner	
1996	K. K. Beck	"Rule of Law"	Malice Domestic 4	Shortlist	
1996	Larry Beinhart	"Death in a Small Town"	New Mystery, Spring 1995	Shortlist	
1996	Kathleen Dougherty	"When Your Breath Freezes"	Ellery Queen's Mystery Magazine, September 1995	Shortlist	
1996	Bill Pomidor	"A Plain and Honest Death"	Ellery Queen's Mystery Magazine, September 1995	Shortlist	
1997	Michael Malone	"Red Clay"	Murder for Love	Winner	
1997	Brendan DuBois	"The Dark Snow"	Playboy, November 1996	Shortlist	
1997	David Corn	"My Murder"	Unusual Suspects	Shortlist	
1997	James Grady	"Kiss The Sky"	Unusual Suspects	Shortlist	
1997	S. J. Rozan	"Hoops"	Ellery Queen's Mystery Magazine, January 1996	Shortlist	
1998	Lawrence Block	"Keller on the Spot"	Playboy, November 1997	Winner	
1998	Simon Brett	"Ways to Kill a Cat"	Malice Domestic 6	Shortlist	
1998	Jeffery Deaver	"The Kneeling Soldier"	Ellery Queen's Mystery Magazine, March 1997	Shortlist	
1998	Stuart M. Kaminsky	"Find Miriam"	New Mystery, Summer 1997	Shortlist	
1998	Stuart M. Kaminsky	"The Man Who Beat the System"	Funny Bones	Shortlist	
1999	Tom Franklin	"Poachers"	Texas Review, Fall-Winter 1998	Winner	
1999	Lawrence Block	"Looking for David"	Ellery Queen's Mystery Magazine, February 1998	Shortlist	
1999	Clark Howard	"The Halfway Woman"	Ellery Queen's Mystery Magazine, February 1998	Shortlist	
1999	Perry Michael Smith	"For Jeff"	Ellery Queen's Mystery Magazine, February 1998	Shortlist	
1999	L. L. Thrasher	"Sacrifice"	Murderous Intent Mystery Magazine, Summer/Fall 1998	Shortlist	

=== 2000s ===
2000s Best Short Story winners and shortlists
Year	Author	Story	Publication	Result	Ref.
2000	Anne Perry	"Heroes"	Murder and Obsession	Winner	
2000	Jeffery Deaver	"Triangle"	Ellery Queen's Mystery Magazine	Shortlist	
2000	James W. Hall	"Crack"	Murder and Obsession	Shortlist	
2000	Stuart M. Kaminsky	"Snow"	First Cases	Shortlist	
2000	Laurie R. King	"Paleta Man"	Irreconcilable Differences	Shortlist	
2001	Peter Robinson	"Missing in Action"	Ellery Queen's Mystery Magazine	Winner	
2001	Noreen Ayres	"Delta Double-Deal"	The Night Awakens	Shortlist	
2001	Mat Coward	"Twelve Little Buggers"	Ellery Queen's Mystery Magazine	Shortlist	
2001	Reginald Hill	"A Candle for Christmas"	Ellery Queen's Mystery Magazine	Shortlist	
2001	Kristine Kathryn Rusch	"Spinning"	Ellery Queen's Mystery Magazine	Shortlist	
2002	S.J. Rozan	"Double-Crossing Delancey"	Mystery Street	Winner	
2002	Jan Burke	"The Abbey Ghosts"	Alfred Hitchcock's Mystery Magazine	Shortlist	
2002	Michael Collins	"The Horrible Senseless Murders of Two Elderly Women"	Fedora: Private Eyes & Tough Guys	Shortlist	
2002	Michael Lewin	"If the Glove Fits"	Alfred Hitchcock's Mystery Magazine	Shortlist	
2002	Margaret Maron	"Virgo in Sapphires"	Ellery Queen's Mystery Magazine	Shortlist	
2003	Raymond Steiber	"Mexican Gatsby"	Ellery Queen's Mystery Magazine	Winner	
2003	Doug Allyn	"The Murder Ballads"	Ellery Queen's Mystery Magazine	Shortlist	
2003	Clark Howard	"To Live and Die in Midland, Texas"	Ellery Queen's Mystery Magazine	Shortlist	
2003	John Mortimer	"Rumpole and the Primrose Path"	The Strand Magazine	Shortlist	
2003	Joyce Carol Oates	"Angel of Wrath"	Ellery Queen's Mystery Magazine	Shortlist	
2004	G. Miki Hayden	"The Maids"	Blood On Their Hands	Winner	
2004	Jeff Abbott	"Bet on Red"	High Stakes	Shortlist	
2004	Shelley Costa	"Black Heart & Cabin Girl"	Blood On Their Hands	Shortlist	
2004	David Edgerley Gates	"Aces and Eights"	Alfred Hitchcock's Mystery Magazine	Shortlist	
2004	Kristine Kathryn Rusch	"Cowboy Grace"	The Silver Gryphon	Shortlist	
2005	Laurie Lynn Drummond	"Something About a Scar"	Anything You Say Can and Will Be Used Against You	Winner	
2005	Terence Faherty	"The Widow of Slane"	Ellery Queen's Mystery Magazine	Shortlist	
2005	Pete Hamill	"The Book Signing"	Brooklyn Noir	Shortlist	
2005	Gary Lovisi	"Adventure of the Missing Detective"	Sherlock Holmes: The Hidden Years	Shortlist	
2005	Luke Sholer	"Imitate the Sun" by	Ellery Queen's Mystery Magazine	Shortlist	
2006	James W. Hall	"The Catch"	Greatest Hits	Winner	
2006	Jeffery Deaver	"Born Bad"	Dangerous Women	Shortlist	
2006	Andrew Klavan	"Her Lord and Master"	Dangerous Women	Shortlist	
2006	Barbara Seranella	"Misdirection"	Greatest Hits	Shortlist	
2006	Daniel Walker	"Welcome to Monroe"	A Kudzu Christmas	Shortlist	
2007	Charles Ardai	"The Home Front"	Death Do Us Part	Winner	
2007	Thomas H. Cook	"Rain"	Manhattan Noir	Shortlist	
2007	Bill Crider	"Cranked"	Damn Near Dead	Shortlist	
2007	S. J. Rozan	"Building"	Manhattan Noir	Shortlist	
2008	Susan Straight	"The Golden Gopher"	Los Angeles Noir	Winner	
2008	Mark Ammons	"The Catch"	Still Waters	Shortlist	
2008	Stuart M. Kaminsky	"Blue Note"	Chicago Blues	Shortlist	
2008	Laura Lippman	"Hardly Knew Her"	Dead Man's Hand	Shortlist	
2008	Daniel Woodrell	"Uncle"	A Hell of a Woman	Shortlist	
2009	T. Jefferson Parker	"Skinhead Central"	Mystery Writers of America Presents: The Blue Religion	Winner	
2009	Sean Chercover	"A Sleep Not Unlike Death"	Hardcore Hardboiled	Shortlist	
2009	David Edgerley Gates	"Skin and Bones"	Alfred Hitchcock's Mystery Magazine	Shortlist	
2009	Laura Lippman	"Scratch a Woman"	Hardly Knew Her	Shortlist	
2009	Dominique Mainard	"La Vie en Rose"	Paris Noir	Shortlist	

=== 2010s ===
2010s Best Short Story winners and shortlists
Year	Author	Story	Publication	Result	Ref.
2010	Luis Alberto Urrea	"Amapola"	Phoenix Noir	Winner	
2010	Ace Atkins	"Last Fair Deal Gone Down"	Crossroad Blues	Shortlist	
2010	Dana Cameron	"Femme Sole"	Boston Noir	Shortlist	
2010	Jim Fusilli	"Digby, Attorney at Law"	Alfred Hitchcock's Mystery Magazine	Shortlist	
2010	Dennis Lehane	"Animal Rescue"	Boston Noir	Shortlist	
2011	Doug Allyn	"The Scent of Lilacs"	Ellery Queen's Mystery Magazine	Winner	
2011	Jeffery Deaver	"The Plot"	First Thrills	Shortlist	
2011	Judith Green	"A Good Safe Place"	Thin Ice	Shortlist	
2011	Stephen Ross	"Monsieur Alice is Absent"	Alfred Hitchcock's Mystery Magazine	Shortlist	
2011	Edmund White	"The Creative Writing Murders"	Dark End of the Street	Shortlist	
2012	Peter Turnbull	"The Man Who Took His Hat Off to the Driver of the Train"	Ellery Queen's Mystery Magazine	Winner	
2012	John C. Boland	"Marley's Revolution"	Alfred Hitchcock's Mystery Magazine	Shortlist	
2012	David Dean	"Tomorrow's Dead"	Ellery Queen's Mystery Magazine	Shortlist	
2012	Bradley Denton	"The Adakian Eagle"	Down These Strange Streets	Shortlist	
2012	Diana Gabaldon	"Lord John and the Plague of Zombies"	Down These Strange Streets	Shortlist	
2012	Neil Gaiman	"The Case of Death and Honey"	A Study in Sherlock	Shortlist	
2013	Karin Slaughter	"The Unremarkable Heart"	Mystery Writers of America Presents: Vengeance	Winner	
2013	Mike Carey	"Iphigenia in Aulis"	An Apple for the Creature	Shortlist	
2013	Steve Liskow	"Hot Sugar Blues"	Mystery Writers of America Presents: Vengeance	Shortlist	
2013	Tom Piccirilli	"The Void it Often Brings With It"	Ellery Queen's Mystery Magazine	Shortlist	
2013	Teresa Solana	"Still Life No. 41"	Ellery Queen's Mystery Magazine	Shortlist	
2014	John Connolly	"The Caxton Private Lending Library & Book Depository"	Bibliomysteries	Winner	
2014	Reed Farrel Coleman	"The Terminal"	Kwik Krimes, edited by Otto Penzler	Shortlist	
2014	Max Allan Collins and Mickey Spillane	"So Long, Chief"	The Strand Magazine	Shortlist	
2014	Trina Corey	"There are Roads in the Water"	Ellery Queen's Mystery Magazine	Shortlist	
2014	Tim L. Williams	"Where That Morning Sun Does Down"	Ellery Queen's Mystery Magazine	Shortlist	
2015	Gillian Flynn	"What Do You Do?"	Rogues	Winner	
2015	Doug Allyn	"The Snow Angel"	Ellery Queen's Mystery Magazine	Shortlist	
2015	John Floyd	"200 Feet"	Strand Magazine	Shortlist	
2015	Dennis Lehane vs. Michael Connelly	"Red Eye"	FaceOff	Shortlist	
2015	Brian Tobin	"Teddy"	Ellery Queen's Mystery Magazine	Shortlist	
2016	Stephen King	"Obits"	The Bazaar of Bad Dreams	Winner	
2016	Megan Abbott	"The Little Men"	Mysterious Bookshop	Shortlist	
2016	Mat Coward	"On Borrowed Time"	Ellery Queen's Mystery Magazine	Shortlist	
2016	Peter Farrelly	"The Saturday Night Before Easter Sunday"	Providence Noir	Shortlist	
2016	Shirley Jackson	"Family Treasures"	Let Me Tell You: New Stories, Essays, and Other Writings	Shortlist	
2016	Denise Mina	"Every Seven Years"	Mysterious Bookshop	Shortlist	
2017	Lawrence Block	"Autumn at the Automat"	In Sunlight or in Shadow	Winner	
2017	Megan Abbott	"Oxford Girl"	Mississippi Noir	Shortlist	
2017	Laura Benedict	"A Paler Shade of Death"	St. Louis Noir	Shortlist	
2017	Stephen King	"The Music Room"	In Sunlight or in Shadow	Shortlist	
2017	Joyce Carol Oates	"The Crawl Space"	Ellery Queen's Mystery Magazine	Shortlist	
2018	John Crowley	"Spring Break"	New Haven Noir	Winner	
2018	Jeffery Deaver	"Hard to Get"	Ellery Queen's Mystery Magazine	Shortlist	
2018	Eric Heidle	"Ace in the Hole"	Montana Noir	Shortlist	
2018	Kenji Jasper	"A Moment of Clarity at the Waffle House"	Atlanta Noir	Shortlist	
2018	S. J. Rozan	"Chin Yong-Yun Stays at Home"	Alfred Hitchcock's Mystery Magazine	Shortlist	
2019	Art Taylor	"English 398: Fiction Workshop"	Ellery Queen's Mystery Magazine	Winner	
2019	Paul Doiron	"Rabid – A Mike Bowditch Short Story"		Shortlist	
2019	John Lutz	"Paranoid Enough for Two"		Shortlist	
2019	Val McDermid	"Ancient and Modern"	Bloody Scotland	Shortlist	
2019	Lisa Unger	"The Sleep Tight Motel"	The Sleep Tight Motel	Shortlist	

=== 2020s ===
2020s Best Short Story winners and shortlists
Year	Author	Story	Publication	Result	Ref.
2020	Livia Llewellyn	"One of These Nights"	Cutting Edge: New Stories of Mystery and Crime by Women Writers	Winner	
2020	Hector Acosta	"Turistas"	Pa'Que Tu Lo Sepas	Shortlist	
2020	Kirsten Tranter	"The Passenger"	Sydney Noir	Shortlist	
2020	Sam Wiebe	"Home at Last"	Die Behind the Wheel: Crime Fiction Inspired by the Music of Steely Dan	Shortlist	
2020	Dave Zeltserman	"Brother's Keeper"	Ellery Queen's Mystery Magazine	Shortlist	
2021	Maaza Mengiste	"Dust, Ash, Flight"	Addis Ababa Noir	Winner	
2021	Leslie Elman	"The Summer Uncle Cat Came to Stay"	Ellery Queen's Mystery Magazine	Shortlist	
2021	Joseph S. Walker	"Etta at the End of the World"	Alfred Hitchcock's Mystery Magazine	Shortlist	
2021	James W. Ziskin	"The Twenty-Five Year Engagement"	In League with Sherlock Holmes	Shortlist	
2022	R.T. Lawton	"The Road to Hana"	Alfred Hitchcock's Mystery Magazine	Winner	
2022	Michael Bracken and James A. Hearn	"Blindsided"	Alfred Hitchcock's Mystery Magazine	Shortlist	
2022	V. M. Burns	"The Vermeer Conspiracy"	Midnight Hour	Shortlist	
2022	Tracy Clark	"Lucky Thirteen"	Midnight Hour	Shortlist	
2022	Gigi Pandian	"The Locked Room Library"	Ellery Queen's Mystery Magazine	Shortlist	
2022	Cornell Woolrich	"The Dark Oblivion"	Ellery Queen's Mystery Magazine	Shortlist	
2023	Gregory Fallis	"Red Flag"	Alfred Hitchcock's Mystery Magazine	Winner	
2023	Charles John Harper	"Backstory"	Alfred Hitchcock's Mystery Magazine	Shortlist	
2023	William Burton McCormick	"Locked-In"	Alfred Hitchcock's Mystery Magazine	Shortlist	
2023	Tim McLoughlin	"The Amnesty Box"	Alcohol, Tobacco, and Firearms	Shortlist	
2023	Donna Moore	"First You Dream, Then You Die"	Black is the Night	Shortlist	
2024	Linda Castillo	"Hallowed Ground"	Macmillan Publishers/ Minotaur Books	Winner	
2024	Heather Graham	"Thriller"	Thriller	Shortlist	
2024	Rob Osler	"Miss Direction"	Ellery Queen's Mystery Magazine	Shortlist	
2024	Ian Rankin	"The Rise"	Amazon Original Stories	Shortlist	
2024	Lisa Scottoline	"Pigeon Tony's Last Stand"	Amazon Original Stories	Shortlist	
2025	Erika Krouse	"Eat My Moose"	Conjunctions: 82, Works & Days	Winner	
2025	Margaret Atwood	"Cut and Thirst"	Amazon Original Stories	Shortlist	
2025	Liv Constantine	"Everywhere You Look"	Amazon Original Stories	Shortlist	
2025	Ariel Lawhon	"Barriers to Entry"	Amazon Original Stories	Shortlist	
2025	Steven Sheil	"The Art of Cruel Embroidery"	Alfred Hitchcock Mystery Magazine – July-August 2024	Shortlist	
2026	Lisa Scottoline	"Julius Katz Draws a Straight Flush"	Alfred Hitchcock Mystery Magazine, September-October 2025	Winner	
2026	Graham Greene	"Reading at Night"	The Strand Magazine	Shortlist	
2026	Charlaine Harris	"The One That Got Away"	Ellery Queen Mystery Magazine, January-February 2025	Shortlist	
2026	Gregg Hurwitz	"Orphan X: A Mysterious Profile"		Shortlist	
2026	Tim Maleeny	"Lucky Heart"	Blood on the Bayou – Case Closed	Shortlist	
2026	Lisa Unger	"The Kill Clause"	Amazon Original Stories	Shortlist	
