= Edgar Allan Poe Award for Best Novel =

Annual literary award

The Edgar Allan Poe Award for Best Novel was established in 1954 as part of the Edgar Awards. Only hardcover novels written by a published American author are eligible. Paperback original novels are eligible for the Edgar Allan Poe Award for Best Paperback Original. Debut novels by American authors are eligible for the Edgar Allan Poe Award for Best First Novel.

Winners for the Edgar Allan Poe Award for Best Novel are listed below.

== Recipients ==
=== 1950s ===
1950s Best Novel winners
Year	Author	Title	Result	Ref.
1954	Charlotte Jay	Beat Not the Bones	Winner	
1955	Raymond Chandler	The Long Goodbye	Winner	
1956	Margaret Millar	Beast in View	Winner	
1956	The Gordons	The Case of the Talking Bug	Shortlist	
1956	Patricia Highsmith	The Talented Mr. Ripley	Shortlist	
1957	Charlotte Armstrong	A Dram of Poison	Winner	
1957	Margot Bennett	The Man Who Didn't Fly	Shortlist	
1957	Charles Samuels and Louise Samuels	Night Fell on Georgia	Shortlist	
1958	Ed Lacy	Room to Swing	Winner	
1958	Bill Ballinger	The Longest Second	Shortlist	
1958	Marjorie Carleton	The Night of the Good Children	Shortlist	
1958	Arthur Upfield	The Bushman Who Came Back	Shortlist	
1959	Stanley Ellin	The Eighth Circle	Winner	
1959	David Alexander	The Madhouse in Washington Square	Shortlist	
1959	Lee Blackstock	The Woman in the Woods (Miss Fenny as Charity Blackstock)	Shortlist	
1959	Dorothy Salisbury Davis	A Gentleman Called	Shortlist	

=== 1960s ===
1960s Best Novel winners
Year	Author	Title	Result	Ref.
1960	Celia Fremlin	The Hours Before Dawn	Winner	
1960	Philip MacDonald	The List of Adrian Messenger	Shortlist	
1961	Julian Symons	The Progress of a Crime	Winner	
1961	Herbert Brean	The Traces of Brillhart	Shortlist	
1961	Peter Curtis	The Devil's Own	Shortlist	
1961	Geoffrey Household	Watcher in the Shadows	Shortlist	
1962	J. J. Marric	Gideon's Fire	Winner	
1962	Anne Blaisdell	Nightmare	Shortlist	
1962	Suzanne Blanc	The Green Stone	Shortlist	
1962	Lionel Davidson	The Night of Wenceslas	Shortlist	
1962	Ross Macdonald	The Wycherly Woman	Shortlist	
1963	Ellis Peters	Death and the Joyful Woman	Winner	
1963	Ross Macdonald	The Zebra-Striped Hearse	Shortlist	
1963	Mark McShane	Seance	Shortlist	
1963	Jean Potts	The Evil Wish	Shortlist	
1963	Dell Shannon	Knave of Hearts	Shortlist	
1963	Shelley Smith	The Ballad of the Running Man	Shortlist	
1964	Eric Ambler	The Light of Day	Winner	
1964	Elizabeth Fenwick	The Make-Believe Man	Shortlist	
1964	Stanton Forbes	Grieve for the Past	Shortlist	
1964	Dorothy B. Hughes	The Expendable Man	Shortlist	
1964	Ellery Queen	The Player on the Other Side	Shortlist	
1965	John le Carré	The Spy Who Came in from the Cold	Winner	
1965	Hans Hellmut Kirst	The Night of the Generals	Shortlist	
1965	Margaret Millar	The Fiend	Shortlist	
1965	Mary Stewart	This Rough Magic	Shortlist	
1966	Adam Hall	The Quiller Memorandum	Winner	
1966	Dorothy Salisbury Davis	The Pale Betrayer	Shortlist	
1966	Len Deighton	Funeral in Berlin	Shortlist	
1966	H. R. F. Keating	The Perfect Murder	Shortlist	
1966	Ross Macdonald	The Far Side of the Dollar	Shortlist	
1966	Mary Stewart	Airs Above the Ground	Shortlist	
1967	Nicolas Freeling	King of the Rainy Country	Winner	
1967	Dick Francis	Odds Against	Shortlist	
1967	Ngaio Marsh	Killer Dolphin	Shortlist	
1967	Donald E. Westlake	The Busy Body	Shortlist	
1968	Donald E. Westlake	God Save the Mark	Winner	
1968	Charlotte Armstrong	The Gift Shop	Shortlist	
1968	Charlotte Armstrong	Lemon in the Basket	Shortlist	
1968	George Baxt	A Parade of Cockeyed Creatures	Shortlist	
1968	Dick Francis	Flying Finish	Shortlist	
1968	Ira Levin	Rosemary's Baby	Shortlist	
1968	Victoria Lincoln	A Private Disgrace	Shortlist	
1969	Michael Crichton	A Case of Need	Winner	
1969	Heron Carvic	Picture Miss Seeton	Shortlist	
1969	Dorothy Salisbury Davis and Jerome Ross	God Speed the Night	Shortlist	
1969	Peter Dickinson	A Glass-Sided Ants' Nest	Shortlist	
1969	Stanley Ellin	The Valentine Estate	Shortlist	
1969	Dick Francis	Blood Sport	Shortlist	

=== 1970s ===
1970s Best Novel winners
Year	Author	Title	Result	Ref.
1970	Dick Francis	Forfeit	Winner	
1970	Dorothy Salisbury Davis	Where the Dark Streets Go	Shortlist	
1970	Peter Dickinson	The Old English Peep Show	Shortlist	
1970	Shaun Herron	Miro	Shortlist	
1970	Chester Himes	Blind Man with a Pistol	Shortlist	
1970	Emma Lathen	When in Greece	Shortlist	
1971	Maj Sjöwall and Per Wahlöö	The Laughing Policeman	Winner	
1971	Shaun Herron	The Hound and the Fox and the Harper	Shortlist	
1971	Margaret Millar	Beyond this Point Are Monsters	Shortlist	
1971	Patricia Moyes	Many Deadly Returns	Shortlist	
1971	Pat Stadley	Autumn of a Hunter	Shortlist	
1971	Donald E. Westlake	The Hot Rock	Shortlist	
1972	Frederick Forsyth	The Day of the Jackal	Winner	
1972	G. F. Newman	Sir, You Bastard	Shortlist	
1972	Tony Hillerman	The Fly on the Wall	Shortlist	
1972	P. D. James	Shroud for a Nightingale	Shortlist	
1972	Arthur Wise	Who Killed Enoch Powell?	Shortlist	
1973	Warren Kiefer	The Lingala Code	Winner	
1973	John Ball	Five Pieces of Jade	Shortlist	
1973	Ngaio Marsh	Tied Up in Tinsel	Shortlist	
1973	Hugh C. Rae	The Shooting Gallery	Shortlist	
1973	Martin Cruz Smith	Canto for a Gypsy	Shortlist	
1974	Tony Hillerman	Dance Hall of the Dead	Winner	
1974	Victor Canning	The Rainbird Pattern	Shortlist	
1974	Francis Clifford	Amigo, Amigo	Shortlist	
1974	P. D. James	An Unsuitable Job for a Woman	Shortlist	
1974	Jean Stubbs	Dear Laura	Shortlist	
1975	Jon Cleary	Peter's Pence	Winner	
1975	Malcolm Bosse	The Man Who Loved Zoos	Shortlist	
1975	Francis Clifford	Goodbye and Amen	Shortlist	
1975	Paul Erdman	The Silver Bears	Shortlist	
1975	Andrew Garve	The Lester Affair	Shortlist	
1976	Brian Garfield	Hopscotch	Winner	
1976	Marvin Albert	The Gargoyle Conspiracy	Shortlist	
1976	Maggie Rennert	Operation Alcestic	Shortlist	
1976	Gerald Seymour	Harry's Game	Shortlist	
1976	Ross Thomas	The Money Harvest	Shortlist	
1977	Robert B. Parker	Promised Land	Winner	
1977	Thomas Gifford	The Cavanaugh Quest	Shortlist	
1977	Richard Neely	A Madness of the Heart	Shortlist	
1977	Gerald Seymour	The Glory Boys	Shortlist	
1977	Trevanian	The Main	Shortlist	
1978	William H. Hallahan	Catch Me: Kill Me	Winner	
1978	William McIlvanney	Laidlaw	Shortlist	
1978	Martin Cruz Smith	Nightwing	Shortlist	
1979	Ken Follett	Eye of the Needle	Winner	
1979	John Godey	The Snake	Shortlist	
1979	Tony Hillerman	Listening Woman	Shortlist	
1979	Ruth Rendell	A Sleeping Life	Shortlist	
1979	Jack S. Scott	The Shallow Grave	Shortlist	

=== 1980s ===
1980s Best Novel winners
Year	Author	Title	Result	Ref.
1980	Arthur Maling	The Rheingold Route	Winner	
1980	Robert Barnard	Death of a Mystery Writer	Shortlist	
1980	Frank Parrish	Fire in the Barley	Shortlist	
1980	Ruth Rendell	Make Death Love Me	Shortlist	
1980	C. P. Snow	A Coat of Varnish	Shortlist	
1981	Dick Francis	Whip Hand	Winner	
1981	Robert Barnard	Death of a Literary Widow	Shortlist	
1981	B. M. Gill	Death Drop	Shortlist	
1981	Reginald Hill	The Spy's Wife	Shortlist	
1981	A. J. Quinnell	Man on Fire	Shortlist	
1982	William Bayer	Peregrine	Winner	
1982	Ted Allbeury	The Other Side of Silence	Shortlist	
1982	Robert Barnard	Death in a Cold Climate	Shortlist	
1982	Liza Cody	Dupe	Shortlist	
1982	Robert Littell	The Amateur	Shortlist	
1982	Patrick McGinley	Bogmail	Shortlist	
1983	Rick Boyer	Billingsgate Shoal	Winner	
1983	Lawrence Block	Eight Million Ways To Die	Shortlist	
1983	Elmore Leonard	Split Images	Shortlist	
1983	Seymour Shubin	The Captain	Shortlist	
1983	Donald E. Westlake	Kahawa	Shortlist	
1984	Elmore Leonard	La Brava	Winner	
1984	Umberto Eco	The Name of the Rose	Shortlist	
1984	John Le Carré	The Little Drummer Girl	Shortlist	
1984	Christopher Leach	Texas Station	Shortlist	
1984	William McIlvanney	The Papers of Tony Veitch	Shortlist	
1985	Ross Thomas	Briarpatch	Winner	
1985	Michael Gilbert	The Black Seraphim	Shortlist	
1985	B. M. Gill	The Twelfth Juror	Shortlist	
1985	Jane Langton	Emily Dickinson Is Dead	Shortlist	
1985	William Pearson	Chessplayer	Shortlist	
1986	L. R. Wright	The Suspect	Winner	
1986	Paul Auster	City of Glass: The New York Trilogy	Shortlist	
1986	Simon Brett	A Shock to the System	Shortlist	
1986	Ruth Rendell	An Unkindness of Ravens	Shortlist	
1986	Ruth Rendell	The Tree of Hands	Shortlist	
1987	Barbara Vine	A Dark-Adapted Eye	Winner	
1987	Brian Freemantle	The Blind Run	Shortlist	
1987	Joe Gores	Come Morning	Shortlist	
1987	P. D. James	A Taste for Death	Shortlist	
1987	Roger L. Simon	The Straight Man	Shortlist	
1988	Aaron Elkins	Old Bones	Winner	
1988	Linda Barnes	A Trouble of Fools	Shortlist	
1988	B. M. Gill	Nursery Crimes	Shortlist	
1988	Peter Lovesey	Rough Cider	Shortlist	
1988	Charlotte MacLeod	The Corpse in Oozak's Pond	Shortlist	
1989	Stuart M. Kaminsky	A Cold Red Sunrise	Winner	
1989	K. C. Constantine	Joey's Case	Shortlist	
1989	Thomas H. Cook	Sacrificial Ground	Shortlist	
1989	Tony Hillerman	A Thief of Time	Shortlist	
1989	David L. Lindsey	In the Lake of the Moon	Shortlist	

=== 1990s ===
1990s Best Novel winners
Year	Author	Title	Result	Ref.
1990	James Lee Burke	Black Cherry Blues	Winner	
1990	Frances Fyfield	A Question of Guilt	Shortlist	
1990	Bartholomew Gill	Death of a Joyce Scholar	Shortlist	
1990	Andrew Coburn	Goldilocks	Shortlist	
1990	Eugene Izzi	The Booster	Shortlist	
1991	Julie Smith	New Orleans Mourning	Winner	
1991	Reginald Hill	Bones and Silence	Shortlist	
1991	R.D. Zimmerman	Deadfall In Berlin	Shortlist	
1991	Jay Brandon	Fade the Heat	Shortlist	
1991	Loren Estleman	Whiskey River	Shortlist	
1992	Lawrence Block	A Dance at the Slaughterhouse	Winner	
1992	Andrew Klavan	Don't Say a Word	Shortlist	
1992	Nancy Pickard	I.O.U.	Shortlist	
1992	Stuart Woods	Palindrome	Shortlist	
1992	Lia Matera	Prior Convictions	Shortlist	
1993	Margaret Maron	Bootlegger's Daughter	Winner	
1993	Joe Gores	32 Cadillacs	Shortlist	
1993	Liza Cody	Backhand	Shortlist	
1993	Kem Nunn	Pomona Queen	Shortlist	
1993	Walter Mosley	White Butterfly	Shortlist	
1994	Minette Walters	The Sculptress	Winner	
1994	Robert Crais	Free Fall	Shortlist	
1994	Peter Hoeg	Smilla's Sense Of Snow	Shortlist	
1994	Gerald Seymour	The Journeyman Tailor	Shortlist	
1994	Marcia Muller	Wolf in the Shadows	Shortlist	
1995	Mary Willis Walker	The Red Scream	Winner	
1995	Lawrence Block	A Long Line of Dead Men	Shortlist	
1995	Peter Abrahams	Lights Out	Shortlist	
1995	Edna Buchanan	Miami, It's Murder	Shortlist	
1995	Peter Robinson	Wednesday's Child	Shortlist	
1996	Dick Francis	Come to Grief	Winner	
1996	John Dunning	The Bookman's Wake	Shortlist	
1996	Edward Marston	The Roaring Boy	Shortlist	
1996	John Katzenbach	The Shadow Man	Shortlist	
1996	Peter Lovesey	The Summons	Shortlist	
1997	Thomas H. Cook	The Chatham School Affair	Winner	
1997	Margaret Lawrence	Hearts and Bones	Shortlist	
1997	Carolyn Wheat	Mean Streak	Shortlist	
1997	Anne Perry	Pentecost Alley	Shortlist	
1997	Laurie R. King	With Child	Shortlist	
1998	James Lee Burke	Cimarron Rose	Winner	
1998	Bill Pronzini	A Wasteland of Strangers	Shortlist	
1998	Ian Rankin	Black and Blue	Shortlist	
1998	Deborah Crombie	Dreaming of the Bones	Shortlist	
1998	Mark T. Sullivan	The Purification Ceremony	Shortlist	
1999	Robert Clark	Mr. White's Confession	Winner	
1999	J. Wallis Martin	A Likeness in Stone	Shortlist	
1999	Robert Goddard	Beyond Recall	Shortlist	
1999	Michael Connelly	Blood Work	Shortlist	
1999	Domenic Stansberry	The Last Days of Il Duce	Shortlist	

=== 2000s ===
2000s Best Novel winners
Year	Author	Title	Result	Ref.
2000	Jan Burke	Bones	Winner	
2000	Rennie Airth	River of Darkness	Shortlist	
2000	Robert Crais	L.A. Requiem	Shortlist	
2000	Stephen Greenleaf	Strawberry Sunday	Shortlist	
2000	Peter Robinson	In a Dry Season	Shortlist	
2001	Joe R. Lansdale	The Bottoms	Winner	
2001	Val McDermid	A Place of Execution	Shortlist	
2001	T. Jefferson Parker	Red Light	Shortlist	
2001	Nancy Pickard	The Whole Truth	Shortlist	
2001	Kristine Kathryn Rusch	A Dangerous Road	Shortlist	
2002	T. Jefferson Parker	Silent Joe	Winner	
2002	D. W. Buffa	The Judgment	Shortlist	
2002	Harlan Coben	Tell No One	Shortlist	
2002	Evan Hunter	Money, Money, Money	Shortlist	
2002	S. J. Rozan	Reflecting the Sky	Shortlist	
2003	S. J. Rozan	Winter and Night	Winner	
2003	Mary Kay Andrews	Savannah Blues	Shortlist	
2003	James Lee Burke	Jolie Blon's Bounce	Shortlist	
2003	Michael Connelly	City of Bones	Shortlist	
2003	Manda Scott	No Good Deed	Shortlist	
2004	Ian Rankin	Resurrection Men	Winner	
2004	Ken Bruen	The Guards	Shortlist	
2004	Michael Connelly	Lost Light	Shortlist	
2004	Natsuo Kirino	Out	Shortlist	
2004	Jacqueline Winspear	Maisie Dobbs	Shortlist	
2005	T. Jefferson Parker	California Girl	Winner	
2005	Laura Lippman	By a Spider's Thread	Shortlist	
2005	Chris Mooney	Remembering Sarah	Shortlist	
2005	Janet Quin-Harkin	Evan's Gate	Shortlist	
2005	Julia Spencer-Fleming	Out of the Deep I Cry	Shortlist	
2006	Jess Walter	Citizen Vince	Winner	
2006	Michael Connelly	The Lincoln Lawyer	Shortlist	
2006	Thomas H. Cook	Red Leaves	Shortlist	
2006	Tess Gerritsen	Vanish	Shortlist	
2006	George Pelecanos	Drama City	Shortlist	
2007	Jason Goodwin	The Janissary Tree	Winner	
2007	Louis Bayard	The Pale Blue Eye	Shortlist	
2007	Joanne Harris	Gentlemen & Players	Shortlist	
2007	Denise Mina	The Dead Hour: Time Only Matters When It's Running Out	Shortlist	
2007	Nancy Pickard	The Virgin of Small Plains	Shortlist	
2007	Olen Steinhauer	Liberation Movements	Shortlist	
2008	John Hart	Down River	Winner	
2008	John Banville	Christine Falls	Shortlist	
2008	Ken Bruen	Priest	Shortlist	
2008	Michael Chabon	The Yiddish Policemen's Union	Shortlist	
2008	Reed Coleman	Soul Patch	Shortlist	
2009	C. J. Box	Blue Heaven	Winner	
2009	Karin Alvtegen	Missing	Shortlist	
2009	Robert Ferrigno	Sins of the Assassin	Shortlist	
2009	Declan Hughes	The Price of Blood	Shortlist	
2009	Morag Joss	The Night Following	Shortlist	
2009	Lisa Lutz	Curse of the Spellmans	Shortlist	

=== 2010s ===
2010s Best Novel winners
Year	Author	Title	Result	Ref.
2010	John Hart	The Last Child	Winner	
2010	Charlie Huston	Mystic Arts of Erasing All Signs of Death	Shortlist	
2010	Jo Nesbø	Nemesis	Shortlist	
2010	Tim Gautreaux	The Missing	Shortlist	
2010	Kathleen George	The Odds	Shortlist	
2010	Malla Nunn	A Beautiful Place to Die	Shortlist	
2011	Steve Hamilton	The Lock Artist	Winner	
2011	Harlan Coben	Caught	Shortlist	
2011	Tom Franklin	Crooked Letter, Crooked Letter	Shortlist	
2011	Tana French	Faithful Place	Shortlist	
2011	Laura Lippman	I'd Know You Anywhere	Shortlist	
2011	Timothy Hallinan	The Queen of Patpong	Shortlist	
2012	Mo Hayder	Gone	Winner	
2012	Ace Atkins	The Ranger	Shortlist	
2012	Keigo Higashino	The Devotion of Suspect X	Shortlist	
2012	Anne Holt	1222	Shortlist	
2012	Philip Kerr	Field Gray	Shortlist	
2013	Dennis Lehane	Live by Night	Winner	
2013	Walter Mosley	All I Did Was Shoot My Man	Shortlist	
2013	Gillian Flynn	Gone Girl: A Novel	Shortlist	
2013	Jesse Kellerman	Potboiler	Shortlist	
2013	Al Lamanda	Sunset	Shortlist	
2013	Lyndsay Faye	The Gods of Gotham	Shortlist	
2013	Ace Atkins	The Lost Ones	Shortlist	
2014	William Kent Krueger	Ordinary Grace	Winner	
2014	Thomas H. Cook	Sandrine’s Case	Shortlist	
2014	Matt Haig	The Humans	Shortlist	
2014	Louise Penny	How the Light Gets In	Shortlist	
2014	Ian Rankin	Standing in Another Man’s Grave	Shortlist	
2014	Lori Roy	Until She Comes Home	Shortlist	
2015	Stephen King	Mr. Mercedes	Winner	
2015	Wiley Cash	This Dark Road to Mercy	Shortlist	
2015	Mo Hayder	Wolf	Shortlist	
2015	Stuart Neville	The Final Silence	Shortlist	
2015	Ian Rankin	Saints of the Shadow Bible	Shortlist	
2015	Karin Slaughter	Coptown	Shortlist	
2016	Lori Roy	Let Me Die in His Footsteps	Winner	
2016	MJ Carter	The Strangler Vine	Shortlist	
2016	Philip Kerr	The Lady from Zagreb	Shortlist	
2016	Michael Robotham	Life or Death	Shortlist	
2016	Duane Swierczynski	Canary	Shortlist	
2016	David C. Taylor	Night Life	Shortlist	
2017	Noah Hawley	Before the Fall	Winner	
2017	Alafair Burke	The Ex	Shortlist	
2017	Reed Farrel Coleman	Where It Hurts	Shortlist	
2017	Lyndsay Faye	Jane Steele	Shortlist	
2017	Alison Gaylin	What Remains of Me	Shortlist	
2018	Attica Locke	Bluebird, Bluebird	Winner	
2018	Kathleen Kent	The Dime	Shortlist	
2018	Philip Kerr	Prussian Blue	Shortlist	
2018	Abir Mukherjee	A Rising Man	Shortlist	
2018	Hannah Tinti	The Twelve Lives of Samuel Hawley	Shortlist	
2019	Walter Mosley	Down the River Unto the Sea	Winner	
2019	Catherine Ryan Howard	The Liar's Girl	Shortlist	
2019	Mike Lawson	House Witness	Shortlist	
2019	Victor Methos	A Gambler's Jury	Shortlist	
2019	Lawrence Osborne	Only to Sleep	Shortlist	
2019	Deanna Raybourn	A Treacherous Curse	Shortlist	

=== 2020s ===
2020s Best Novel winners
Year	Author	Title	Result	Ref.
2020	Elly Griffiths	The Stranger Diaries	Winner	
2020	Barbara Bourland	Fake Like Me	Shortlist	
2020	Peter Heller	The River	Shortlist	
2020	Abir Mukherjee	Smoke and Ashes	Shortlist	
2020	Michael Robotham	Good Girl, Bad Girl	Shortlist	
2021	Deepa Anappara	Djinn Patrol on the Purple Line	Winner	
2021	Caroline B. Cooney	Before She Was Helen	Shortlist	
2021	Richard Osman	The Thursday Murder Club	Shortlist	
2021	Ivy Pochoda	These Women	Shortlist	
2021	Kwei Quartey	The Missing American	Shortlist	
2021	Heather Young	The Distant Dead	Shortlist	
2022	James Kestrel	Five Decembers	Winner	
2022	Rhys Bowen	The Venice Sketchbook	Shortlist	
2022	S. A. Cosby	Razorblade Tears	Shortlist	
2022	Will Leitch	How Lucky	Shortlist	
2022	Kat Rosenfield	No One Will Miss Her	Shortlist	
2023	Danya Kukafka	Notes on an Execution	Winner	
2023	John Darnielle	Devil House	Shortlist	
2023	Gabino Iglesias	The Devil Takes You Home	Shortlist	
2023	Nita Prose	The Maid	Shortlist	
2023	Kellye Garrett	Like a Sister	Shortlist	
2023	Chuck Hogan	Gangland	Shortlist	
2024	James Lee Burke	Flags on the Bayou	Winner	
2024	S. A. Cosby	All the Sinners Bleed	Shortlist	
2024	Jennifer Cody Epstein	The Mad Women of Paris	Shortlist	
2024	Jessica Knoll	Bright Young Women	Shortlist	
2024	Michael Koryta	An Honest Man	Shortlist	
2024	William Kent Krueger	The River We Remember	Shortlist	
2024	Colson Whitehead	Crook Manifesto	Shortlist	
2025	Charlotte Vassell	The In Crowd	Winner	
2025	Robert Jackson Bennett	The Tainted Cup	Shortlist	
2025	Katrina Carrasco	Rough Trade	Shortlist	
2025	Sarah Easter Collins	Things Don't Break on Their Own	Shortlist	
2025	Nicolás Ferraro	My Favorite Scar	Shortlist	
2025	Liz Moore	The God of the Woods	Shortlist	
2025	Amy Tintera	Listen for the Lie	Shortlist	
2026	Robert Crais	The Big Empty	Winner	
2026	Allison Epstein	Fagin the Thief	Shortlist	
2026	Laila Lalami	The Dream Hotel	Shortlist	
2026	Charlotte McConaghy	Wild Dark Shore	Shortlist	
2026	Adam Plantinga	Hard Town	Shortlist	
2026	Trisha Sakhlecha	The Inheritance	Shortlist	
2026	Scott Turow	Presumed Guilty	Shortlist	
