= Elizabeth Way =

Elizabeth Way may refer to:

- Elizabeth Way, Cambridge, a road in northeast Cambridge, England
- Elizabeth Fenwick Way, American mystery writer

== See also ==
- Queen Elizabeth Way, a highway in the Canadian province of Ontario
