= Wendy Hornsby =

American mystery fiction writer (born 1947)

- Born: September 26, 1947 (age 78); Los Angeles, California, U.S.
- Education: UCLA; Long Beach State
- Occupations: Mystery writer, history professor
- Writing career
- Notable awards: Orange Coast Fiction award (1987); Edgar Allan Poe award for best short story, Mystery Writers of America (1992); American Reader award (1992); Reviewers Choice award (1993)
- Website: wendyhornsby.com/wordpress

Wendy Hornsby (born September 26, 1947) is an American writer of mystery fiction and a professor of history at Long Beach City College. Hornsby's published work began in 1987 and 1990 with two police procedurals set in Orange County, California, and featuring history teacher Kate Teague and police officer Roger Tejeda. Since 1992, she has published more than a dozen novels about documentary filmmaker Maggie MacGowen and homicide detective Mike Flint of the Los Angeles Police Department, as well as many short stories.

Hornsby names "hard-boiled California authors" such as Raymond Chandler, Dashiell Hammett, and Ross Macdonald as influences on her work, and she especially praises Margaret Millar's Stranger in My Grave, which combined "the social conscience of hard-boiled detectives and a well-rounded, beautifully realized character in her Tom Aragon. More than any other author, Mrs. Millar has been my role model."

== Critical reception ==
Hornsby's "Nine Sons" won an Edgar Allan Poe Award for "best short story" from the Mystery Writers of America in 1992. Her other awards include an Orange Coast Fiction award (1987); an American Reader award (1992), and a Reviewers Choice award (1993).

Writing in The St. James Guide to Crime and Mystery Writers, Jean Swanson says, "Hornsby's mysteries are often commended for their well-written sex scenes, as well as for their realistic depiction of urban violence" and how crime can damage city neighborhoods. "She also seems to have tapped into a vast well of stories about the old days in the LAPD, when cops routinely beat up suspects and just as routinely had sex with hookers and groupies."

== Bibliography ==
Kate Teague crime series

- No Harm (1987)
- Half a Mind (1990)

Maggie MacGowen crime series

- Telling Lies (1992)
- Midnight Baby (1993)
- Bad Intent (1994)
- 77th Street Requiem (1995)
- A Hard Light (1997)
- In the Guise of Mercy (2009)
- The Paramour's Daughter (2010)
- The Hanging (2012)
- The Color of Light (2014)
- Disturbing the Dark (2016)
- Number 7, Rue Jacob (2018)
- A Bouquet of Rue (2019)

Short story collection

- Nine Sons: Collected Mysteries (2002)
