= Elly Griffiths =

English crime novelist (born 1963)

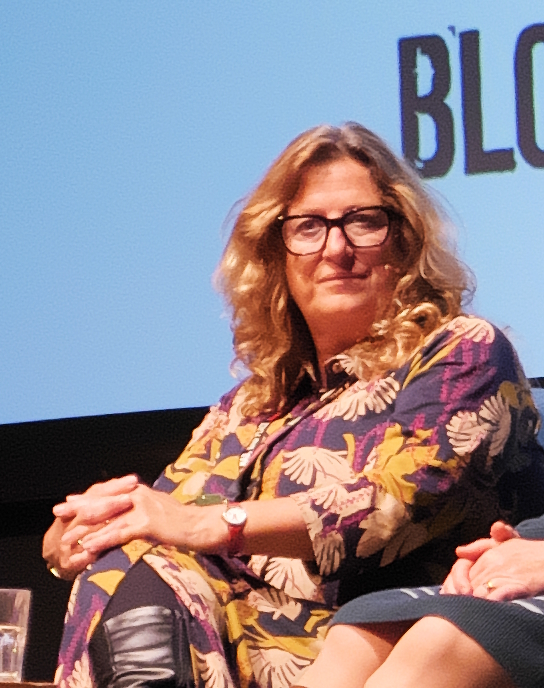
- Born: Domenica de Rosa; August 17, 1963; London, England
- Occupation: Author
- Writing career
- Pen name: Elly Griffiths
- Years active: 2000s-present
- Genres: Crime fiction, Romance, Children's fiction
- Notable works: Ruth Galloway series, Stephens and Mephisto series

Domenica de Rosa (born 17 August 1963), known by her pen name Elly Griffiths, is a British crime novelist. She has written three series as Griffiths, one featuring Ruth Galloway, one featuring Detective Inspector Edgar Stephens and Max Mephisto, and the Harbinder Kaur series.

== Early life ==
Griffiths was born in London. After reading English at King's College London, she worked in publishing for many years.

== Writing career ==
Griffiths' first series features as a main character forensic archaeologist Ruth Galloway, who lives in a remote seaside cottage near King's Lynn in Norfolk and teaches at the University of North Norfolk. This character was inspired by Griffiths' husband, who gave up a city job to train as an archaeologist, and her aunt, "who lives on the Norfolk coast and filled her niece's head with the myths and legends of that area". Griffiths released the first book in this series, The Crossing Places (Ruth Galloway #1), in 2009.

Griffiths' second series, set in 1950s Brighton, focuses on the duo of Detective Inspector Edgar Stephens and magician Max Mephisto. Griffiths released the first book in this series, The Zig Zag Girl, in 2014.

In 2017, Griffiths was the Programming Chair for the Theakston's Old Peculier Crime Writing Festival, part of the Harrogate International Festivals portfolio.

Griffiths won the 2020 Edgar Allan Poe Award for Best Novel for The Stranger Diaries. In 2021, The Postscript Murders was shortlisted in the Gold Dagger category at the Crime Writers' Association Awards.

== Bibliography ==
=== As Elly Griffiths ===
==== Ruth Galloway series ====
- The Crossing Places (Ruth Galloway, No.1). Houghton Mifflin Harcourt. 2009. ISBN 978-0547229898.
- The Janus Stone (Ruth Galloway, No.2). Quercus Publishing. 2010. ISBN 978-1849161589.
- The House at Sea's End (Ruth Galloway, No.3). Quercus Publishing. 2010. ISBN 978-1849163675.
- A Room Full of Bones (Ruth Galloway, No.4). Quercus Publishing. 2012. ISBN 978-1849163668.
- Ruth's First Christmas Tree (Ruth Galloway, #4.5). Quercus Publishing. 2012.
- A Dying Fall (Ruth Galloway, No.5). Quercus Publishing. 2013. ISBN 978-0857388896.
- The Outcast Dead (Ruth Galloway, No.6). Quercus Publishing. 2014. ISBN 978-0857388902.
- The Ghost Fields (Ruth Galloway, No.7). Quercus Publishing. 2015. ISBN 978-1848663305.
- The Woman in Blue (Ruth Galloway, No.8). Quercus Publishing. 2016. ISBN 978-0544417854.
- The Chalk Pit (Ruth Galloway, No.9). Quercus Publishing. 2017. ISBN 978-1784296599.
- The Dark Angel (Ruth Galloway, No.10). Quercus Publishing. 2018. ISBN 978-1784296636.
- The Stone Circle (Ruth Galloway, No.11). Quercus Publishing. 2019. ISBN 978-1786487308.
- The Lantern Men (Ruth Galloway, No.12). Quercus Publishing. 2020. ISBN 978-1787477537.
- The Night Hawks (Ruth Galloway, No.13). Quercus Publishing. 2021. ISBN 978-1787477803.
- The Locked Room (Ruth Galloway, No.14). Quercus Publishing. 2022. ISBN 978-1529409659.
- The Last Remains (Ruth Galloway, No.15). Quercus Publishing. 2023. ISBN 978-1529409710.

==== The Brighton Mysteries series ====
- The Zig Zag Girl (2014)
- Smoke and Mirrors (2015)
- The Blood Card (2016)
- The Vanishing Box (2017)
- Now You See Them (2019)
- The Midnight Hour (2021)
- The Great Deceiver (2023)

==== Harbinder Kaur series ====
- The Stranger Diaries (2018)
- The Postscript Murders (2020)
- Bleeding Heart Yard (2022)
- The Last Word (January 2024)

==== A Girl Called Justice series ====
- A Girl Called Justice (2019)
- The Smugglers' Secret (2020)
- A Ghost in the Garden (2021)
- The Spy at the Window (2022)

==== Short stories ====
- "Murder at the Villa Rosa", printed in Marple: Twelve New Stories (2022)

==== Ali Dawson ====
- The Frozen People (2025)
- The Killing Time (2026)

=== As Domenica de Rosa ===
- The Eternal City (2005)
- One Summer in Tuscany (2008)
- The Italian Quarter (2004)
- The Secret of Villa Serena (2007)
- Return to the Italian Quarter (2018)
