= The Big Night (1951 film) =

1951 film by Joseph Losey

- Theatrical release lobby card
- Directed by: Joseph Losey
- Screenplay by: Joseph Losey; Stanley Ellin; Hugo Butler; Ring Lardner, Jr.
- Based on: the novel Dreadful Summit by Stanley Ellin
- Produced by: Philip A. Waxman
- Starring: John Barrymore, Jr. Preston Foster; Joan Lorring
- Cinematography: Hal Mohr
- Edited by: Edward Mann
- Music by: Lyn Murray
- Production company: Philip A. Waxman Productions
- Distributed by: United Artists
- Release date: November 1, 1951 (Los Angeles)
- Running time: 75 minutes
- Country: United States
- Language: English
- Budget: $300,000

The Big Night is a 1951 American film noir directed by Joseph Losey and starring Preston Foster, Joan Lorring and John Drew Barrymore (billed as John Barrymore, Jr.) in his first starring role. The film is based on a script written by Joseph Losey and Stanley Ellin, based on Ellin's 1948 novel Dreadful Summit. Hugo Butler and Ring Lardner Jr. also contributed to the screenplay, but both men were admitted communists, and following Lardner's conviction for contempt of Congress, they were uncredited when the film was first released.

== Plot ==
Shy, bespectacled George LaMain is bullied by classmates, near his home. It is his 17th birthday, and his father Andy who has seen the bullying produces a cake for George to blow out the candles. George and his father are to attend a boxing match that evening, and George queries why Andy's long-term girlfriend Frances is not to join them. He is given no answer. Influential sports columnist Al Judge flanked by two heavies enters the bar and gives Andy a humiliating and savage beating in front of the patrons and George, who is held back by the barman and close friend, Flanagan. George does not understand why his father on Judge's order had stripped to his waist and knelt in front of Judge in passive compliance before the beating began. Flanagan escorts the beaten Andy to his bed. When closing up the bar, George finds a gun in the till. He takes Andy's gun. He puts on Andy's houndstooth jacket and fedora, and leaves the apartment.

With no clear direction, George begins a night journey, first attending a boxing match that he and his father were planning to attend to celebrate his birthday, hoping that he will find Judge there. At the arena, George sells his father's ticket but is accused of scalping by a con man posing as a police officer, who takes the ticket money. Inside the arena, the man who bought the ticket, journalism teacher Professor Cooper, explains what happened and shares his disdain for Judge.

Cooper takes George to one of Judge's haunts, where George encounters the con man who had robbed him and is provoked into lashing out at him, apparently beating him unconscious. At another club, he meets Cooper's girlfriend Julie and takes his first drink. At Julie's apartment, George wakes to find that Julie's sister Marion has been watching him. She expresses sympathy and concern for him and they kiss, but George reacts with hostility and leaves when he finds that Marion had tried to hide his gun.

George finds Judge's address and goes there to confront him. Facing George's gun, Judge explains that he punished Andy because Judge's sister Frances had killed herself when Andy refused to marry her. George decides to leave, but Judge picks up George's gun and begins to phone the police. The men fight and the gun goes off. Judge falls to the floor. George seeks shelter with Marion and Cooper, but Cooper, fearing scandal, roughly throws him out of the apartment. In the daylight hours, George tries to visit a church for help, but the priest is just going out on an urgent visit. George returns to his apartment, where Andy attempts to cover up his son's involvement by stripping him and putting him to bed as the police sirens are heard. Just as Andy has put on the houndstooth jacket George had been wearing, the police burst in and Andy is handcuffed. George realises that his father is trying to assume responsibility for the shooting and, dodging Flanagan, frantically stops the police from leaving. Exhausted and confused, George confesses and produces the gun. However, one of the policemen reveals that Judge was only wounded. His father explains that he had not been able to marry Frances because he was still married to George's mother, who had fled with another man. Andy persuades George to surrender the gun and both are taken away by the police. Flanagan, who has watched the scene silently, closes the bar as the noise of the sirens recedes.

== Cast ==
- John Barrymore, Jr. as George La Main
- Preston Foster as Andy La Main
- Joan Lorring as Marion Rostina
- Howard St. John as Al Judge
- Dorothy Comingore as Julie Rostina
- Philip Bourneuf as Dr. Lloyd Cooper
- Howland Chamberlin as Flanagan
- Myron Healey as Patrolman Kennealy
- Emile Meyer as Peckinpaugh (credited as Emil Meyer)
- Mauri Leighton as Terry Angelus
- Robert Aldrich as Man at Fights (uncredited)

== Reception ==
In a contemporary review for The New York Times, critic Bosley Crowther called the film "a bleakly pretentious melodrama" and wrote: "Not only is the story presumptuous and contrived, without any clarification of character or theme, but it is directed by Joseph Losey in a provokingly ostentatious style and it is played by a cast of professionals as though it were an exercise at dramatic school. ... Apparently everybody was concerned with theatrical effects and forgot all about a story with point and intelligence."

Critic Philip K. Scheuer of the Los Angeles Times wrote: "The whole business is keyed to notes of such bizarre brutality ... that I never felt any real wrench of pity for the kid. Losey and writer Stanley Ellin seem to have aimed for a kind of half-world 'Winterset'—and, this time, missed."

== Sources ==
- Callahan, Dan. 2003. Losey, Joseph. Senses of Cinema, March 2003. Great Directors Issue 25. https://www.sensesofcinema.com/2003/great-directors/losey/#:~:text=The%20dominant%20themes%20of%20Losey's,love%20story%20in%20his%20films. Accessed October 12, 2024.
- Hirsch, Foster. 1980. Joseph Losey. Boston, MA: Twayne Publishers. ISBN 0-8057-9257-0
- Palmer, James; Riley, Michael. 1993. The Films of Joseph Losey. Cambridge: Cambridge University Press. ISBN 0-521-38386-2
