= Stanley Ellin =

American novelist

Stanley Bernard Ellin (October 6, 1916 – July 31, 1986) was an American mystery writer. Ellin was born in Brooklyn, New York. After a brief tenure in the Army, at the insistence of his wife, Ellin began writing full time. While his novels are acclaimed, he is best known for his short stories. In May 1948, his first sale, and one of Ellin's most famous short stories, "The Specialty of the House" ("Speciality of the House" in England), appeared in Ellery Queen's Mystery Magazine.

In the years to come, Ellin's fame as an author grew. He was awarded three Edgar Allan Poe Awards (Edgar Award). His first Edgar was for the short story "The House Party" in 1954, the next for the short story "The Blessington Method" in 1956, and his third for the novel The Eighth Circle in 1959. Several episodes of Alfred Hitchcock Presents were based on Ellin short stories, and his novels Dreadful Summit, House of Cards, and The Bind were adapted into feature films. Charles Silet writes that Ellin "did much toward erasing the distinctions between traditional genre and mainstream fiction by writing novels more concerned with character and locale than with plot."

Ellin was a longtime member and past president of the Mystery Writers of America (MWA). In 1981, he was awarded the MWA's highest honor, the Grand Master Award. Writing in The Times, Marcel Berlins said, "Stanley Ellin is the unsurpassed master of the short story in crime fiction."

== Life ==
Stanley, born in Bath Beach, Brooklyn, was the only child of Louis and Rose Mandel Ellin. They were a loving family and he enjoyed a happy childhood. Ellin writes fondly, if a bit sardonically, in the "Introduction" to The Specialty of the House and Other Stories:

At age three, I was shipped off in my mother's care to a boarding house in Lakewood, New Jersey, to recuperate from some lingering ailment. In my earliest days I was always recuperating from some lingering ailment or other, and this one must have been particularly interesting to have led to that hejira from Brooklyn to the remote wilderness of New Jersey where, as everyone in my family knew, the fresh air alone was life restoring.

He garnered a love for reading at a young age. As a boy, Stanley urged his father to read him Beatrix Potter's story The Tale of Peter Rabbit over and over: "I have some vivid memories of that bucolic episode [in Lakewood, N.J.], but most vivid is the memory of my father, on a weekend visit, sitting by my bed filling me with bliss as he read Peter Rabbit to me, patiently read it over and over on demand until I was letter perfect in it. He must have read other stories to me as well, but of them I have no recollection because they lacked the true magic." He eagerly read books in the family library by the likes of Mark Twain, Rudyard Kipling, Robert Louis Stevenson, Guy de Maupassant and Edgar Allan Poe, who were literary influences on his writing.

He graduated from New Utrecht High School, where he had been a precocious student.

Ellin was educated at Brooklyn College and received a Bachelor of Arts in 1936 when he was 19 years old. He married Jeanne Michael, a freelance editor and former classmate, in 1937; they had one daughter, Sue Ellin (Mrs. William Jacobsen), and a granddaughter, Tae Ellin. Apart from some travel abroad and some time spent in Miami Beach, Florida, he lived his entire life in Brooklyn.

To support his family, Ellin worked as a magazine salesman and distributor, boilermaker's apprentice, steel worker, shipyard worker, dairy farmer, and junior college teacher before serving in the US Army in 1944-1945 during World War II. Afterward, Ellin began writing full time while his family lived on his service unemployment allowance and on his wife's editing salary.

Lawrence Block reported, "Ellin was a perfectionist, working slowly and deliberately, producing a page of typescript on a good day. He admitted to having rewritten the opening paragraph of a short story as many as forty times before going on to the next paragraph and polishing each subsequent page in similar fashion before proceeding further... He managed only one a year, sent each in turn to Ellery Queen's Mystery Magazine, and never had one rejected." "Only one a year" is not precisely accurate, but the Internet Speculative Fiction Database shows it is close.

Ellin co-wrote the screenplay for the 1951 film The Big Night along with Joseph Losey, Hugo Butler and Ring Lardner, although Ellin and Losey were the only ones credited for it up until the year 2000. He also wrote book reviews for such venues as The New York Times Book Review, chiefly of suspense novels, as well as essays such as "Mystery Novel or Crime Novel" (Writer, vol. 86, January 1973, pp. 22–24) and "The Destiny of the House" (Armchair Detective, vol. 12, Winter 1979, p. 195).

He appeared, along with Frederic Dannay, Brian Garfield, and Denis Healey, on the television show Crime Writers in the episode "Murder for Pleasure" (Season 1, Episode 6, 10 December 1978).

Ellin died of a heart attack (complications from a stroke) at Kings County Hospital Center in Brooklyn, New York, on July 31, 1986. He and his wife had become Quakers in the late 1960s. His ashes, and those of his wife, lie in the Friends Cemetery in Prospect Park, Brooklyn.

== Reception ==
Fellow crime writer Edward D. Hoch wrote, "Stanley Ellin's career was blessed with a first story that everyone remembers and many consider the finest of the three dozen or so short stories he produced in over 35 years. But in truth even without 'The Specialty of the House' Ellin would be one of the modern masters of the genre, with a reputation built firmly upon novels and some of the most imaginative stories in the mystery-suspense field." Among other comments, Hoch compares Ellin's story "The Cat's-Paw" to Arthur Conan Doyle's "The Red-Headed League."

Richard Keenan wrote in 1988, "Indisputably a master of plot structure in both the short story and the novel, Stanley Ellin is more highly regarded by many critics for the ingenious imagination at work in his short fiction. His mystery novels, however, have a wide and loyal following, and it is in his novels that Ellin most effectively demonstrates his opposition to the view that crime fiction is at best merely escapist fare. Ellin identifies not only with Dashiell Hammett, Raymond Chandler, Agatha Christie, and Arthur Conan Doyle but also with Fyodor Dostoevski and William Faulkner, who also dealt with the theme of crime and punishment."

Art Taylor, a writer of stories for such venues as Ellery Queen's Mystery Magazine and a reviewer for the Washington Post Book World and other periodicals, wrote that "what has given Ellin such lasting renown in the pantheon of short story writers is surely the precision of his plotting: the clockwork accuracy by which each element of a given tale contributes subtly, effortlessly, inexorably toward some crushing plot turn or crisp final image. Reflecting in the collection's introduction on the short story writers who influenced him, Ellin himself praised how De Maupassant 'reduced stories to their absolute essence' and how his endings, 'however unpredictable,' ultimately seemed 'as inevitable as doom'—qualities which Ellin emulated and perfected in his own work."

Taylor added that Ellin's stories are sometimes left unresolved:

...several of Ellin's best-known and best-loved works end somewhere shy of telling the full story, instead leaving the reader him- or herself to fill in some of the blanks. "The Specialty of the House," for example, lays out all the clues behind the culinary masterpieces at Sbirro's [Restaurant] but we readers have to figure out exactly what's going on back in that kitchen. At the end of "The House Party," Ellin provides glimpses of the true nature of the festivities but then leaves us uneasily sorting through the larger ramifications... [T]hese open endings...force us to become an active part of the storytelling, at the very least puzzling out the "Why?" and "What if?" and "But suppose…" possibilities, or trying to tie up the loose ends left purposefully dangling, or supplying the emotional responses underplayed by the author, or at the further extreme, having some hefty moral quandaries laid at our doorsteps, as Ellin's "The Moment of Decision" so expertly does.

Clarence Petersen of the Chicago Tribune wrote about the reception to Ellin's The Dark Fantastic, which was turned down by eleven publishers before finding a home:

The publishers were troubled by the novel's villain, a retired history professor crazed by racism, who plans to atone for a lifetime of "hypocritical" liberalism by blowing up the Brooklyn apartment building he owns, taking his own life and the lives of his black tenants. His opposite numbers are a white private detective, who has two days to stop him, and the detective's black girlfriend, who lives in the building. It is a terrific psychological suspense story, and well-written, as Ellin's books characteristically are. ... At the bottom of the controversy is that Ellin has supplied his bigot with reasons for his actions, reasons that some critics apparently have found compelling enough to be called "justifications." That's not what they are, says Ellin. "One of the things everyone avoids talking about is the feeling of whites watching a world ending.... It's not justification, but there is a reason for every act, including the maddest." Ellin, 67, is in a rare position to make such distinctions. He has lived in the same Brooklyn block for 42 years, refusing to join the whites who fled as the neighborhood became 95 percent black.

Kirkus Reviews wrote of The Blessington Method and Other Strange Tales, "These patently, potently malevolent short stories, in which the strange is kept well within reach of possibility, show Mr. Ellin not only in top form but in the medium in which he is most expert... And the title story and the concluding The Question, which an electrocutioner can no longer avoid, may well take their place alongside of Ellin's long remembered The Specialty of the House. Mr. Ellin uses such unremarkable places and people that his end effects are even more startling."

=== The Specialty of the House ===
"The Specialty of the House" gained acclaim on its 1948 publication and decades later still has enthusiasts. This "macabre little tale about an unusual restaurant in Manhattan and its lonely patrons" earned the Best First Story Award in the Ellery Queen's Mystery Magazine contest of 1948. "Laffler, a gourmet, goes with his assistant for a dinner at an exclusive restaurant. The kitchen is what Laffler wants to see – which is a great mistake" because he discovers that the specialty, called lamb Amirstan, is actually made of human flesh. Mystery novelist J. Madison Davis agreed that it is "a dish one shouldn't be too curious about lest one become an ingredient." A reviewer for The Guardian said the story displays "both a debt to Edgar Allan Poe and an acute understanding of human nature that is the key to the success of his work."

Cannibalism has been mentioned in several other humorous works, such as the short story "The Two Bottles of Relish" by Lord Dunsany, first published in 1932; the short story "To Serve Man" (1950) by Damon Knight; the story "Pig" (1960) by Roald Dahl; the novel The Only Good Body's a Dead One (1971) by Tony Kenrick; and 1991's film Delicatessen.

== Published works ==
=== Novels ===
- 1948 - Dreadful Summit: A Novel of Suspense (aka The Big Night) (New York: Simon & Schuster) - "Ellin made his debut as a novelist with Dreadful Summit (1948). It dealt with a father-son relationship, when a sixteen-year-old boy obtains a gun and sets out to avenge his father's beating and humiliation. The action is squeezed into twenty-four hours."
- 1952 - The Key to Nicholas Street (New York: Simon & Schuster)
- 1958 - The Eighth Circle (New York: Random House) (Edgar Award for Best Novel, 1959)
- 1960 - The Winter after This Summer (New York: Random House)
- 1962 - The Panama Portrait (New York: Random House)
- 1967 - House of Cards (New York: Random House) - "a Hitchcockian psychological thriller with international intrigue"
- 1968 - The Valentine Estate (New York: Random House) (shortlisted for Edgar Award for Best Novel, 1969)
- 1970 - The Bind (aka The Man from Nowhere) (New York: Random House)
- 1972 - Mirror, Mirror on the Wall (New York: Random House, ISBN 0-394-47168-7) - This novel won the Grand Prix de Littérature Policière in 1974 and was selected by H.R.F. Keating for his Crime & Mystery: The 100 Best Books (New York: Carroll & Graf Publishers, 1987)
- 1974 - Stronghold (New York: Random House, ISBN 0-394-49129-7)
- 1977 - The Luxembourg Run (New York: Random House, ISBN 0-394-49646-9)
- 1979 - Star Light, Star Bright (New York: Random House, ISBN 0-394-42217-1)
- 1983 - The Dark Fantastic (New York: Mysterious Press, c1983, ISBN 0-892-96059-0)
- 1985 - Very Old Money (New York: Arbor House)

=== Short story collections ===
- 1956 - Mystery Stories (aka Quiet Horror; contains "The Specialty of the House", "The Cat's Paw", "Death on Christmas Eve", "The Orderly World of Mr. Appleby", "Fool's Mate", "The Best of Everything", "The Betrayers", "The House Party", "Broker's Special", "The Moment of Decision") (New York: Simon & Schuster)
- 1964 - The Blessington Method and Other Strange Tales (New York: Random House, 1964). (Contains "Foreword" by Julian Symons, "The Blessington Method," "The Faith of Aaron Menefee," "You Can't Be a Little Girl All Your Life," "Robert," "Unreasonable Doubt," "The Day of the Bullet," "Beidenbauer's Flea," "The Seven Deadly Virtues," "The Nine-to-Five Man" and "The Question.")
- 1975 - Kindly Dig Your Grave and Other Wicked Stories. Edited and with introduction by Ellery Queen. (New York: Davis Publications) (Contains "Kindly Dig Your Grave," "The Crime of Ezechiele Coen," "The Great Persuader," "The Day the Thaw Came to 127," "Death of an Old-Fashioned Girl," "The Last Bottle in the World," "Coin of the Realm," "The Payoff," "The Other Side of the Wall," "The Corruption of Officer Avakadian," and "The Twelfth Statue.)
- 1979 - The Specialty of the House and Other Stories: The Complete Mystery Tales, 1948-1978 (New York: Mysterious Press) (ISBN 0-752-85141-1)

=== Selected short stories ===
- "The Specialty of the House", EQMM, 1948
- "The House Party", EQMM, May 1954; (Edgar Allan Poe Award for Best Short Story, 1955)
- "The Blessington Method", EQMM, June 1956; (Edgar Allan Poe Award for Best Short Story, 1957)
- "The Day of the Bullet", EQMM, October 1959; (shortlisted for Edgar Allan Poe Award for Best Short Story, 1960)
- "The Crime of Ezechiele Coen", EQMM, November 1963; (shortlisted for Edgar Allan Poe Award for Best Short Story, 1964)
- "The Last Bottle in the World", EQMM, February 1968; (shortlisted for Edgar Allan Poe Award for Best Short Story, 1969)
- "Graffiti", EQMM, March 1983; (shortlisted for Edgar Allan Poe Award for Best Short Story, 1984)

== Media adaptations ==
=== Films ===
The following films were adapted from Stanley Ellin's novels and stories.

- 1951 - The Big Night, USA, directed by Joseph Losey, (novel Dreadful Summit)
- 1959 - À double tour, France, directed by Claude Chabrol, (novel The Key to Nicholas Street)
- 1964 - Nothing But the Best, UK, directed by Clive Donner, (short story The Best of Everything)
- 1968 - House of Cards, USA, directed by John Guillermin, (novel)
- 1979 - Sunburn, USA, directed by Richard C. Sarafian, (novel The Bind)
- 1997 - A Prayer in the Dark, USA, directed by Jerry Ciccoritti, (novel Stronghold)

=== Television ===
- 1949 - "Help Wanted" - Adapted by Reginald Denham for Suspense, 14 June 1949 (Season 1, Episode 14), starring Otto Kruger, D. A. Clarke-Smith, and Ruth McDevitt.
- 1950 - "The Orderly Mr. Appleby" - Adapted for The Web, 11 July 1950 (Season 1, Episode 2), starring Jonathan Harris, Selena Royle and Howard Wierum.
- 1956 - "Help Wanted" - Adapted by Robert C. Dennis and Mary Orr for Alfred Hitchcock Presents, 1 April 1956 (Season 1, Episode 27), starring John Qualen, Lorne Greene, Madge Kennedy and Malcolm Atterbury.
- 1956 - "The Orderly World of Mr. Appleby" - Adapted by Victor Wolfson and Robert C. Dennis for Alfred Hitchcock Presents, 15 April 1956, (Season 1, Episode 29), starring Robert H. Harris, Meg Mundy, Gage Clarke, and Michael Ansara.
- 1957 - "Broker's Special" - Adapted by Jack Jacobs for The George Sanders Mystery Theater, 3 August 1957 (Season 1, Episode 7), starring Diana Darrin, Mary Lawrence, and Lyle Talbot.
- 1958 - "The Festive Season" - Adapted by James P. Cavanagh for Alfred Hitchcock Presents, 4 May 1958, (Season 3, Episode 31), starring Carmen Mathews, Richard Waring and Edmon Ryan.
- 1959 - "The Blessington Method" - Adapted by Halsted Welles for Alfred Hitchcock Presents, 15 November 1959, (Season 5, Episode 8), starring Henry Jones, Dick York, Elizabeth Patterson, and Irene Windust.
- 1959 - "Specialty of the House" - Adapted by Bernard C. Schoenfeld and Victor Wolfson for Alfred Hitchcock Presents, 13 December 1959 (Season 5, Episode 12), starring Robert Morley, Kenneth Haigh and Madame Spivy.
- 1960 - "The Day of the Bullet" - Adapted by Bill S. Ballinger for Alfred Hitchcock Presents, 14 February 1960 (Season 5, Episode 20), starring Barry Gordon, Dennis Patrick, Biff Elliot, and John Craven.
- 1960 - "Circle of Evil" - Adapted from The Eighth Circle by Robert Blees for Westinghouse Desilu Playhouse, 16 March 1960 (Season 2, Episode 13), starring Ken Clark, Robert Clarke, Felicia Farr and Hugh O'Brian.
- 1961 - "The Best of Everything" - Adapted by Frederic Raphael for Drama 61-67, 20 August 1961 (Season 1, Episode 12).
- 1961 - "Moment of Decision" - Adapted by Larry Marcus and Porter Putnam for Alcoa Premiere, November 1961 (Season 1, Episode 4), starring Fred Astaire, Harry Townes and Oliver McGowan.
- 1961 - "You Can't Be a Little Girl All Your Life" - Adapted for Alfred Hitchcock Presents, 21 November 1961 (Season 7, Episode 7), starring Dick York and Carolyn Kearney.
- 1962 - "The Faith of Aaron Menefee" - Adapted by Ray Bradbury for Alfred Hitchcock Presents, 30 January 1962 (Season 7, Episode 17), starring Sidney Blackmer, Andrew Prine and Maggie Pierce.
- 1962 - "The Betrayers" - Adapted by Michael Gilbert for Drama 61-67, 16 December 1962 (Season 2, Episode 21), starring Erica Rogers.
- 1967 - "Robert" - Adapted by Jeremy Paul for Half Hour Story, 2 August 1967 (Season 1, Episode 12), starring Robert Langley, Angela Baddeley, Richard Davies, Suzanne Neve and Frank Windsor.
- 1972 - "Alter-Ego" - Adapted by D.C. Fontana and Richard Matheson for Ghost Story (later retitled Circle of Fear), 27 October 1972 (Season 1, Episode 6), starring child actor Michael-James Wixted, Sebastian Cabot, Helen Hayes, Collin Wilcox, Gene Andrusco, Charles Aidman, Geoffrey Horne and Phyllis Love.
- 1973 - "Death of an Old-Fashioned Girl" - Adapted by Anthony Fowles for Orson Welles Great Mysteries, 24 November 1973 (Season 1, Episode 13), starring Carol Lynley, Francesca Annis, John Le Mesurier, Jack Shepherd and Anne Stallybrass.
- 1980 - "The Orderly World of Mr. Appleby" - Adapted by Robin Chapman for Roald Dahl's Tales of the Unexpected, 7 June 1980 (Season 2, Episode 15), starring Robert Lang, Elizabeth Spriggs, and Cyril Luckham.
- 1981 - "The Best of Everything" - Adapted by Denis Cannan for Tales of the Unexpected, 26 April 1981 (Season 4, Episode 4), starring Michael Kitchen, Jeremy Clyde, Judi Bowker, Brewster Mason, and Rachel Kempson.
- 1981 - "The Last Bottle in the World" - Adapted by Denis Cannan for Tales of the Unexpected, 7 June 1981 (Season 4, Episode 10), starring Nigel Hawthorne, Gary Bond, and Lynette Davies.
- 1981 - "Kindly Dig Your Own Grave" - Adapted by Robin Chapman for Tales of the Unexpected, 14 June 1981 (Season 4, Episode 11), starring Micheline Presle, Robert H. Thomson, and Celia Gregory.
- 1987 - "The Specialty of the House" - Adapted by Jonathan Glassner for Alfred Hitchcock Presents, 21 March 1987 (Season 2, Episode 9), starring John Saxon, Jennifer Dale, and Neil Munro (the characters' names are all changed).

=== Radio ===
- 1974 - "The Speciality of the House" - Adapted by Barry Campbell for BBC World Service's The Price of Fear, 13 April 1974 (Season 2, Episode 2), starring Vincent Price, Hugh Burden and Francis De Wolfe.
- 1988 - "The Speciality of the House" - Adapted by Colin Hadyn Evans for BBC Radio 4's Fear On 4, 20 March 1988 (Season 1, Episode 12), introduced by Edward de Souza, and starring Timothy West and Paul Gregory.
- 2018 - "The Speciality of the House" - Adapted by Anita Sullivan for BBC Radio 4's 15 Minute Drama.
