= Ed Lacy =

American novelist

Ed Lacy (August 25, 1911 - January 7, 1968), born Leonard S. Zinberg, was an American writer of crime and detective fiction. Lacy, who was Jewish American, is credited with creating "the first credible African American PI" character in fiction, Toussaint "Touie" Marcus Moore. Room to Swing, his 1957 novel that introduced Touie Moore, received the 1958 Edgar Award for Best Novel.

== Biography ==
Lacy was born in New York City. He was a member of the League of American Writers, and served on its Keep America Out of War Committee in January 1940 during the period of the Molotov–Ribbentrop Pact. He died of a heart attack in Harlem in 1968, at the age of 56.

== Bibliography ==
all bibliographical data from physical source material; first state hardcover (US:UK)/paperback

Zinberg, Len "Walk Hard-Talk Loud", The Bobbs-Merrill Company, Indianapolis, 1940

Zinberg, Len "Walk Hard-Talk Loud", Lion Books Inc.,N.Y.,February, 1950 (pbk)

Zinberg, Len "What D'ya Know for Sure", Doubleday & Co., Garden City, N.Y., 1947

Zinberg, Len "Strange Desires" (What D'ya Know for Sure), Avon Publishing Co., N.Y. 1949 (pbk)

Zinberg, Len "What D'ya Know for Sure", Avon Publishing Co., N.Y. January, 1955 (pbk)

Zinberg, Len "Hold With The Hares", Doubleday & Co.,Garden City, N.Y., 1948

Lacey (sic), Ed (pseud. Len Zinberg, The Woman Aroused", Avon Publishing Co., N.Y. 1951

Lacy, Ed (pseud. Len Zinberg, "The Woman Aroused", Robert Hale Ltd., London 1969

Lacy, Ed (pseud. Len Zinberg), "Sin in Their Blood", Eton Books Inc. N.Y. 1952

Lacy, Ed (pseud. Len Zinberg), "Death in Passing" ('Sin in Their Blood'), T.V.Boardman and Co. Ltd., London 1959

Lacy, Ed (pseud. Len Zinberg), "Strip for Violence", Eton Books Inc. N.Y. 1953

April, Steve (pseud. Len Zinberg) "Route 13", Funk & Wagnalls Company, N.Y. 1954

Lacy, Ed (pseud. Len Zinberg) "Enter Without Desire", AvonPublishing Co. N.Y. 1954

Lacy, Ed (pseud. Len Zinberg) "Go for the Body", Avon Publishing co. N.Y. 1954

Lacy, Ed (pseud. Len Zinberg), "Go For the Body", T.V.Boardman and Co. Ltd.,London 1959

Lacy, Ed (pseud. Len Zinberg) "The Best That Ever Did It", Harper & Brothers N.Y. 1955

Lacy, Ed (pseud. Len Zinberg) "Visa to Death" ('The Best That Ever Did It') Permabooks, N.Y. March, 1956 (pbk)

Lacy, Ed (pseud. Len Zinberg) "The Best That Ever Did It", Hutchinson and Co. Ltd., London 1957

Lacy, Ed (pseud. Len Zinberg) "...The Men From The Boys", Harper & Brothers, N.Y. 1956

Lacy, Ed )pseud. Len Zinberg) "...The Men From the Boys", Pocket Books Inc.,N.Y. April, 1957 (pbk)

Lacy, Ed (pseud Len Zinberg) "Keep an Eye on the Body", Mercury Mystery Magazine, Mercury Publications Inc. N.Y., November 1956

Lacy, Ed (pseud. Len Zinberg) "Lead With Your Left" ('Keep an Eye on the Body'), Harper & Brothers, N.Y. 1957

Lacy, Ed (pseud. Len Zinberg) "Lead With Your Left", Permabooks N.Y., February, 1958 (pbk)

Turner, Russell (pseud. Len Zinberg) The Short Night", Hillman Periodicals Inc. N.Y. 1957

Lacy, Ed (pseud. Len Zinberg) "Room to Swing", Harper & Brothers, N.Y. 1957 (Edgar Award, 1957)

Lacy, Ed (pseud. Len Zinberg) "Room to Swing", Pyramid Publications Inc., N.Y. 1958

Lacy, Ed (pseud. Len Zinberg) "Breathe No More My Lady", Avon Publishing Co., N.Y. 1958

Lacy, Ed (pseud. Len Zinberg) "Shakedown for Murder", Avon Publishing Co., N.Y. 1958

Lacy, Ed (pseud. Len Zinberg) "Devil For the Witch"('Shakedown for Murder'), T.V.Boardman and Co. Ltd., London 1958

Lacy, Ed (pseud. Len Zinberg) "Time Wounds all Heels", Mercury Mystery Magazine, Mercury Publications Inc. N.Y. December 1958

Lacy, Ed (pseud. Len Zinberg) "Be Careful How You Live" ('Time Wounds All Heels') Harper & Brothers, N.Y. 1959

Lacy, Ed (pseud. Len Zinberg) "Dead End" ('Be Careful How You Live') Pyramid Publications Inc., N.Y. January, 1960 (pbk)

Lacy, Ed (pseud. Len Zinberg) "Blonde Bait" Zenith Books Inc. N.Y. 1959

Lacy, Ed (pseud. Len Zinberg) "A Deadly Affair", Hillman Periodicals Inc. N.Y. 1960

Lacy, Ed (pseud. Len Zinberg) "The Big Fix", T.V.Boardman and Co. Ltd., London 1961

Lacy. Ed (pseud. Len Zinberg) "Bugged for Murder", Avon Publishing Co., N.Y. 1961

Lacy, Ed (pseud. Len Zinberg) "South Pacific Affair", Belmont Productions Inc. N.Y. 1961

Lacy, Ed (pseud. Len Zinberg) "The Freeloaders", Berkley Publishing Corp. N.Y. 1961

Lacy, Ed (pseud. Len Zinberg) "The Sex Castle", Paperback Library Inc., N.Y. 1963

Lacy, Ed (pseud. Len Zinberg) "Two Hot To Handle", Paperback Library Inc., N.Y. 1963

Lacy, Ed (pseud. Len Zinberg) "Sleep in Thunder", Tempo Books, N.Y. 1964

Lacy, Ed (pseud. Len Zinberg) "Moment of Untruth", Lodestone Publishing Inc., N.Y. 1964

Lacy, Ed (pseud. Len Zinberg) "Pity The Honest", T.V.Boardman and Co. Ltd., London, 1964

Lacy, Ed (pseud. Len Zinberg) "Pity The Honest", MacFadden-Bartell Corp., N.Y. 1965

Lacy, Ed (pseud. Len Zinberg) "Harlem Underground", Pyramid Publications Inc., N.Y. 1965

Lacy, Ed (pseud. Len Zinberg) "Double Trouble", T.V.Boardman and Co. Ltd., London 1965

Lacy, Ed (pseud. Len Zinberg) "Double Trouble", Lancer Books Inc., N.Y. 1967 (pbk)

Lacy, Ed (pseud. Len Zinberg) "The Hotel Dwellers", Harper & Row, N.Y. 1966

Lacy, Ed (pseud. Len Zinberg) "In Black & Whitey", Lancer Books Inc., N.Y. 1967

(Note: Len Zinberg died in January, 1968)

Lacy, Ed (pseud. Len Zinberg) "The Napalm Bugle", Pyramid Publications Inc., N.Y. July, 1968

Lacy, Ed (pseud. Len Zinberg) "The Big Bust", Pyramid Publications Inc., N.Y. July, 1969

== Series ==
David Wintino

There are 2 novels and 2 short stories featuring detective, David Wintino.

1. Lead with Your Left (1957)
2. Double Trouble (1967)
3. "Say 'Cheese'" (1964), "The Taut Alibi" (1968)

=== Toussaint M. Moore ===
There are 2 novels and 1 short story featuring detective, Toussaint M. Moore

1. Room to Swing (1957)
2. Moment of Untruth (1964)
3. "The Death Of El Indio" (1961) (Original short story version of Moment of Untruth)

=== Lee Hayes ===
1. Harlem Underground (1965)
2. In Black & Whitey (1967)

== Other Novels ==
- Walk Hard—Talk Loud (1940)
- Hold with the Hares (1948)
- End to Violence (1950)
- The Woman Aroused (1951)
- Sin in Their Blood (also issued as Death in Passing) (1952)
- Strip for Violence (1953)
- Enter Without Desire (1954)
- Go for the Body (1954)
- The Best That Ever Did It (also issued as Visa to Death) (1955)
- The Men from the Boys (1956)
- Breathe No More, My Lady (1958)
- Shakedown for Murder (1958)
- Be Careful How You Live (also issued as Dead End) (1959)
- Blonde Bait (1959)
- The Big Fix (1960)
- A Deadly Affair (1960)
- Bugged for Murder (1961)
- The Freeloaders (1961)
- South Pacific Affair (1961)
- The Sex Castle (also issued as Shoot It Again) (1963)
- Two Hot to Handle (two novellas: The Coin of Adventure and Murder in Paradise) (1963)
- Pity the Honest (1965)
- The Hotel Dwellers (1966)
- The Napalm Bugle (1968)
- The Big Bust (1969)
- The Woman Aroused (1969)
- Sleep in Thunder (1972
