= The Stranger Diaries =

2018 murder mystery

- First edition paperback
- Author: Elly Griffiths
- Audio read by: Andrew Wincott; Esther Wane; Sarah Feathers; Anjana Vasan
- Language: English
- Publisher: Quercus Publishing, Houghton Mifflin
- Publication date: 2018
- Publication place: United Kingdom
- Media type: Print (hardback, paperback), ebook, audiobook
- Pages: 416 pages
- ISBN: 1786487403 First edition paperback
- Followed by: The Postscript Murders

The Stranger Diaries is a 2018 murder mystery thriller by British crime novelist Domenica de Rosa, writing under the penname of Elly Griffiths. It was first published in the United Kingdom in 2018 through Quercus Publishing and was republished in 2019 through Houghton Mifflin.

The novel is primarily told through the viewpoints of English teacher Clare Cassidy, Detective Sergeant Harbinder Kaur, and Clare's daughter Georgia "Georgie". Interspersed throughout the novel are portions of the short story "The Stranger", written by fictional author R. M. Holland, a long deceased author that Clare is researching.

The Stranger Diaries won the 2020 Edgar Award for Best Novel and is the first in a series centered upon DS Harbinder Kaur.

== Synopsis ==
Clare is a high school English teacher who teaches in an old house that was formerly the home of R. M. Holland, author of the short story "The Stranger". This excites her, as she has plans to write a book about Holland and hopefully solve some of the mysteries surrounding him, notably what happened to his wife Alice and possible daughter Marianna. These plans are put to the side after a fellow teacher, Ella, is found murdered, her body accompanied by the handwritten note "Hell is empty", a quote from "The Stranger" and Shakespeare's The Tempest. Initially intending to remain unnoticed by the detectives investigating the murder, Harbinder Kaur and her partner Neil, Clare becomes involved in the investigation partly due to her ties to Ella and also because she deliberately hides information about Ella's affair with Rick, the leader of the school English department. The murderer also leaves her messages in her private journal that give the impression that the murderer is obsessed with Clare, particularly after Rick is found murdered.

The police have many suspects, such as Patrick, a friend to Clare's daughter Georgie, but no definitive evidence that links them to the murders. Eventually an attack on Clare's ex-husband Simon prompts Harbinder to recommend that Clare and Georgie go to Clare's grandparents' home in Scotland while Harbinder herself remains in their home, in the hopes of catching the killer unawares. Clare discovers that the handwriting of Georgie's 21-year-old boyfriend Ty matches the killer's handwriting exactly, as some postcards he'd sent Georgie caught her attention. Harbinder rushes to Scotland and manages to catch Ty just as he is about to murder Georgie.

When interviewed, Ty states that he had first met Clare when she was attending a teacher conference in his city. He had been working as a bartender and fallen instantly in love with her, so he followed her home and began squatting in a nearby abandoned factory, taking work at a local bar. He decided to begin dating Georgie after deciding that she needed to be protected, not out of actual love for the girl. He justifies his killings by saying that both Rick and Ella were upsetting Clare, having learned about them from her journal. He gives similar rationales for Simon and Georgie, adding that once they were gone he and Clare could start over.

The novel ends with Clare noting that she was encouraged to take a position as the deputy lead of the English department. Georgie shows promise as a horror writer. She uncovers the truth about Marianna: she was a dog, and Holland doted upon Marianna after his wife's death.

=== "The Stranger" ===
The short story begins with an anonymous narrator sharing a story and brandy with another passenger. When the narrator was a young man studying divinity in Cambridge, he was invited to join the prestigious Hell Club. For the initiation ceremony he and several others were, at midnight, to enter an abandoned home blindfolded, light a candle, and proclaim "Hell is Empty" from a window on the house's upper floors, then wait for the others to answer "and all the devils are here!". When it comes time for the narrator to make his trek, he succeeds in performing his task but when removing his blindfold he discovers that the others have all been murdered. Only a couple of other members that were with him survived and they are sworn to secrecy. The bodies are discovered and although there are rumors about their ties to the murders, they are never questioned. In the following years the narrator manages to temporarily achieve normalcy but becomes withdrawn and obsessed when the other survivors of the night's murders are discovered murdered on Halloween, one each year. Determined not to fall victim as he is the only one left, the narrator has chosen to travel on a train, accompanied by his faithful hound Herbert.

He concludes the narration by noting that the passenger must be feeling the effect of the brandy, which he laced with a plant that can paralyze the drinker and subject them to hallucinations. The narrator apologizes, stating that he doesn't know what is after him but hopes that it will be satisfied by the passenger's life instead.

== Development ==
Griffith chose to set the novel in an ordinary school as she "wanted to set the book somewhere very everyday as well, somewhere that can bridge the everyday and the more spooky and surreal". She drew upon her twin children when writing the character of Georgie and her own experiences of writing a diary, a practice she has kept up since the age of 11, for Clare's habit of journal writing. Griffith stated that she was interested in revisiting the character but that The Stranger Diaries was initially intended to be a standalone novel. In 2020 she released the second novel in the series, The Postscript Murders, through Quercus Publishing.

== Release ==
The Stranger Diaries was first published in paperback format in the United Kingdom during 2018 through Quercus Publishing. It was re-published in hardcover in the United States and United Kingdom on 5 March 2019 through Houghton Mifflin. An audiobook adaptation narrated by Esther Wane, Sarah Feathers, and Anjana Vasan Quercus, with Andrew Wincott narrating the portions of "The Stranger", was released through Quercus Publishing and Recorded Books.

A Swedish translation by Carla Wiberg was published in Sweden through Modernista, which also released an audiobook adaptation narrated by Angela Kovács. Hugo Thriller published a French translation that same year, under the title Le Journal de Claire Cassidy.

== Reception ==
The Guardian and Seattle Times both reviewed The Stranger Diaries, with the Seattle Times drawing comparison to Anthony Horowitz's Magpie Murders and both outlets praising the novel's characters.

=== Awards ===
- Edgar Award for Best Novel (2020, won)
