= T. Jefferson Parker =

American novelist of crime procedurals (born 1953)

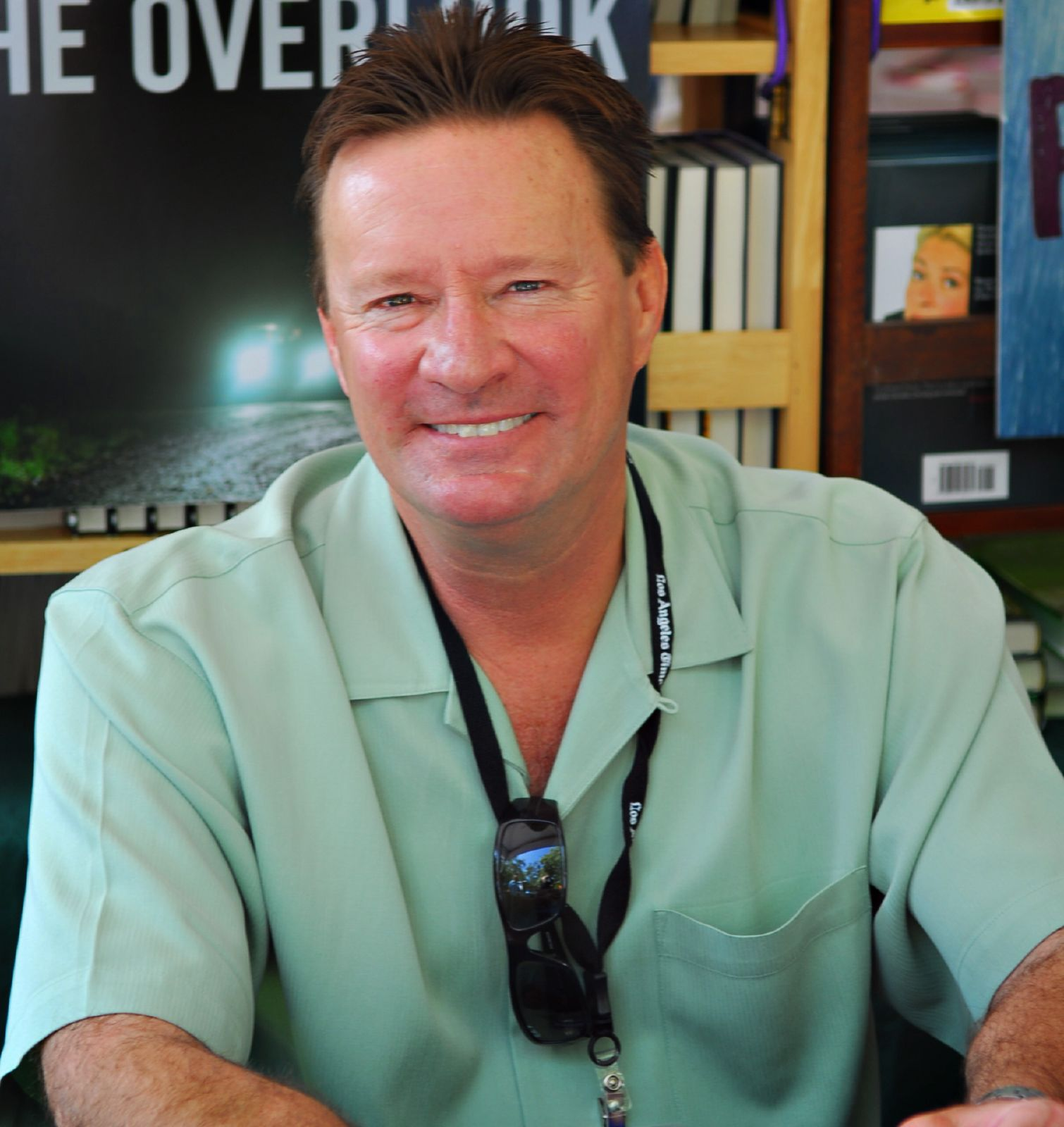
- Born: 1953 (age 72–73); Los Angeles, California, U.S.
- Education: University of California, Irvine
- Occupation: Novelist
- Writing career
- Genre: Police procedural
- Notable awards: Edgar Allan Poe Award for Best Novel (2002, 2005)
- Website: www.tjeffersonparker.com

T. Jefferson Parker (born 1953) is an American novelist. Parker's books are police procedurals set in Southern California.

== Early life and education ==
Parker was born in 1953 in Los Angeles, California, and he has lived his entire life in Southern California. He was named T. Jefferson Parker. The "T" doesn't stand for anything. His mother said she thought it would look good on the presidential letterhead. He was educated in public schools and received his bachelor's degree from the University of California, Irvine in English.

== Career ==
Parker began his writing career as a journalist for The Newport Ensign. Parker later switched jobs to the Daily Pilot, winning three Orange County Press Club Awards. It was at this time that he began writing his first novel, Laguna Heat. He received the Edgar Award for Best Novel in 2002 for Silent Joe and again in 2005 for California Girl. In 2008, his short story "Skinhead Central" won Parker another Edgar award, making him one of the elite few writers to have won the Edgar three times.

=== Writing style ===
Parker's stories usually have one protagonist, and occasionally part of the story will be shown from the antagonist's point of view. His stories usually build suspense as the protagonist tries to prevent further crimes. The crimes depicted in the story are usually gruesome acts, which cause much unrest in the town where the story is set. Parker is renowned for using California settings and depicting the effects of crime on a community.

He draws on his experience as a lifelong California resident. Although most of his work is set in Orange County and Los Angeles County, he has relocated to San Diego and some of his more recent writing is set there.

== Personal life ==
Parker lives in Southern California, where he writes and spends time with his family. His hobbies include hiking, hunting, fishing, and playing tennis.

== Awards ==
Awards for Parker's writing
Year	Title	Award	Result
2001	Red Light	Edgar Allan Poe Award for Best Novel	Finalist
2001	Silent Joe	Hammett Prize	Finalist
2002	Silent Joe	Barry Award for Best Novel	Finalist
2002	Silent Joe	Edgar Allan Poe Award for Best Novel	Winner
2002	Silent Joe	Macavity Award for Best Novel	Finalist
2004	California Girl	Hammett Prize	Finalist
2005	California Girl	Anthony Award for Best Novel	Finalist
2005	California Girl	Edgar Allan Poe Award for Best Novel	Winner
2005	California Girl	Macavity Award for Best Novel	Finalist
2010	Iron River	Hammett Prize	Finalist
2010	The Renegades	International Thriller Writers Awards for Best Novel	Finalist
2018	The Room of White Fire	Shamus Award for Best Novel	Winner

== Novels ==
=== Standalone novels ===
- Laguna Heat (1985)
- Little Saigon (1987)
- Pacific Beat (1991)
- Summer of Fear (1993)
- The Triggerman's Dance (1996)
- Where Serpents Lie (1998)
- Silent Joe (2001)
- Cold Pursuit (2003)
- California Girl (2004)
- The Fallen (2006)
- Storm Runners (2007)
- Full Measure (2014)
- Crazy Blood (2016)
- A Thousand Steps (2022)
- The Rescue (2023)
- Desperation Reef (2024)

=== Roland Ford series ===
- The Room Of White Fire (2017)
- Swift Vengeance (2018)
- The Last Good Guy (2019)
- Then She Vanished (2020)

=== Charlie Hood series ===
- L.A. Outlaws (2008)
- The Renegades (2009)
- Iron River (2010)
- The Border Lords (2011)
- The Jaguar (2012)
- The Famous and the Dead (2013)

=== Merci Rayborn series ===
- The Blue Hour (1999)
- Red Light (2000)
- Black Water (2002)

=== As editor ===
- Hook, Line & Sinister (2010)
