= Peter Turnbull (author) =

British writer of mystery and crime procedural novels (born 1950)

Peter John Turnbull was born 23 October 1950, Rotherham, Yorkshire, England), son of John Colin, an engineer, and Patricia Turnbull, a nurse. He attended Richmond College of Fine Arts; Cambridge College of Arts and Technology, B.A., 1974; University of Huddersfield, M.A.; Cardiff University, Wales, C.Q.S.W. (certificate in social work), 1978. Religion: Anglican. He worked as a government social worker at Strathclyde Regional Council, Glasgow, Scotland, from 1978 to 1995. He also worked as a steelworker and crematorium assistant in Sheffield and London, and has done social work in Brooklyn, NY, before becoming a full-time writer in 1995 and returning to his native Yorkshire, where he currently resides.

== Books ==
He has produced books in three series, as well as other, non-series books.

Glasgow P Division (set in Glasgow, Scotland)

1. Deep and Crisp and Even (1981) (finalist for the New Blood Dagger Award in 1981.)
2. Dead Knock (1982)
3. Fair Friday (1983)
4. Big Money (1984)
5. Two Way Cut (1988)
6. Condition Purple (1989)
7. And Did Murder Him (1991)
8. Long Day Monday (1992)
9. The Killing Floor (1994)
10. The Man With No Face (1998)

Hennessey and Yellich (set in York, England)

1. Fear of Drowning (1999)
2. Deathtrap (2000)
3. Perils and Dangers (2001)
4. The Return (2001)
5. After the Flood (2002)
6. Dark Secrets (2002)
7. All Roads Leadeth (2003)
8. Treasure Trove (2003)
9. The Dance Master (2004)
10. Hopes and Fears (2004)
11. The Chill Factor (2005)
12. The Legacy (2005)
13. False Knight (2006)
14. Fire Burn (2006)
15. Chelsea Smile (2007)
16. Once a Biker (2007)
17. No Stone Unturned (2007)
18. Turning Point (2008)
19. Informed Consent (2009)
20. Deliver Us from Evil (2011)
21. Aftermath (2010)
22. The Altered Case (2012)
23. Gift Wrapped (2013)
24. A Dreadful Past (2016)

Harry Vicary (set in London, England)

1. Improving the Silence (2009)
2. Deep Cover (2011)
3. The Garden Party (2012)
4. Denial of Murder (2014)
5. In Vino Veritas (2015)

Maurice Mundy (set in London)

1. A Cold Case (2016)

Other novels

- The Claws of the Gryphon (1986)
- The Justice Game (1990)
- Embracing Skeletons (1996)
- Reality Checkpoint (2004)
- Sweet Humphrey (2005)
- The Trophy Wife (2005)

Non-fiction

- The Killer Who Never Was (1996): About Jack the Ripper; says they were a series of unrelated murders.
