= Thomas H. Cook =

American novelist (born 1947)

- Born: September 19, 1947 (age 78); Fort Payne, Alabama, U.S.
- Education: Georgia State College; Hunter College; Columbia University (MPhil)
- Occupation: Author
- Notable work: The Chatham School Affair, Red Leaves
- Awards: Edgar Award, Barry Award, Duncan Lawrie Dagger, Anthony Award, Martin Beck Award

Thomas H. Cook (born September 19, 1947) is an American author, whose 1996 novel The Chatham School Affair received an Edgar award from the Mystery Writers of America.

== Biography ==
Thomas H. Cook was born in Fort Payne, Alabama, and holds a bachelor's degree from Georgia State College, a master's degree in American history from Hunter College, and a Master of Philosophy degree from Columbia University.

From 1978 to 1981, Cook taught English and History at Dekalb Community College in Georgia, and served as book review editor for Atlanta magazine from 1978 to 1982, when he took up writing full-time.

Cook began his first novel, Blood Innocents, while he was still in graduate school. It was published in 1980, and he has published steadily since then. A film version of one of his books, Evidence of Blood, was released in 1997.

Eight of his works have been nominated for awards, including Red Leaves in 2006, which was also shortlisted for the Crime Writers' Association's Duncan Lawrie Dagger and the Anthony Award, and went on to win the Barry Award and the Martin Beck Award.

Cook lives with his family in Cape Cod and New York City and Los Angeles.

== Awards and honors ==
Awards for Cook's writing
Year	Title	Award	Result	Ref.
1981	Blood Innocents	Edgar Allan Poe Award for Best Paperback Original	Finalist	
1989	Sacrificial Ground	Edgar Allan Poe Award for Best Novel	Finalist	
1995	Breakheart Hill	Hammett Prize	Finalist	
1997	The Chatham School Affair	Barry Award for Best Novel	Finalist	
1997	The Chatham School Affair	Edgar Allan Poe Award for Best Novel	Winner	
1997	The Chatham School Affair	Macavity Award for Best Novel	Finalist	
2001	Places in the Dark	Barry Award for Best Novel	Finalist	
2005	Into the Web	Barry Award for Best Paperback Original	Finalist	
2005	Into the Web	Edgar Allan Poe Award for Best Paperback Original	Finalist	
2006	Red Leaves	Anthony Award for Best Novel	Finalist	
2006	Red Leaves	Barry Award for Best Novel	Winner	
2006	Red Leaves	Edgar Allan Poe Award for Best Novel	Finalist	
2006	Red Leaves	Gold Dagger	Finalist	
2014	Sandrine’s Case	Barry Award for Best Novel	Finalist	
2014	Sandrine’s Case	Edgar Allan Poe Award for Best Novel	Finalist	
2014	Sandrine’s Case	Macavity Award for Best Mystery Novel	Finalist	

== Publications ==
- Blood Innocents (Playboy, 1980)
- The Orchids (Houghton Mifflin, 1982). ISBN 039532503X
- Tabernacle (Houghton Mifflin, 1983). ISBN 0395343968
- Elena (Houghton Mifflin, 1986). ISBN 0395356326
- Sacrificial Ground (Putnam, 1988). ISBN 0399133399
- Flesh and Blood (Putnam, 1989). ISBN 0399134093
- Streets of Fire (Putnam, 1989). ISBN 0399134905
- Early Graves (Dutton, 1990). ISBN 0525249184
- Night Secrets (Putnam, 1990). ISBN 0399135278
- The City When It Rains (Putnam, 1991). ISBN 0399135553
- Evidence of Blood (Putnam, 1991). ISBN 0399136681
- Blood Echoes (Dutton, 1992). ISBN 0525933999
- Mortal Memory (Putnam, 1993). ISBN 0399138293
- Breakheart Hill (Bantam, 1995). ISBN 0553096516
- The Chatham School Affair (Bantam, 1996). ISBN 0553096524
- Instruments of Night (Bantam, 1998). ISBN 055310554X
- Places in the Dark (Bantam, 2000). ISBN 0553105639
- The Interrogation (Bantam, 2002). ISBN 0553800957
- Taken: A Novelization (Dell, 2002). ISBN 044024126X
- Moon Over Manhattan, with Larry King, (New Millennium Press, 2003). ISBN 1893224570
- Peril (Bantam, 2004). ISBN 0553800981
- Into the Web (Bantam, 2004). ISBN 0553580922
- Red Leaves (Harcourt, 2005). ISBN 0151012504
- The Murmur of Stones (Quercus, 2006)
  (published in the US as The Cloud of Unknowing, Harcourt, 2007). ISBN 978-0151012602
- Master of the Delta (Harcourt, 2008). ISBN 978-0151012541
- The Best American Crime Reporting 2008, (with Jonathan Kellerman and Otto Penzler), (Harper Perennial, 2008). ISBN 978-0061490835
- The Fate of Katherine Carr (2009). ISBN 978-0151014019
- The Last Talk with Lola Faye (Houghton Mifflin Harcourt, 2010). ISBN 978-0151014071
- The Quest for Anna Klein (Houghton Mifflin Harcourt, 2011). ISBN 978-0547364643
- The Crime of Julian Wells (Mysterious Press, 2012). ISBN 978-0802126030
- Sandrine's Case (Mysterious Press, 2013). ISBN 978-0802126085
- Fatherhood and Other Stories (Pegasus Press, 2013). ISBN 1605984671
- A Dancer in the Dust (Grove/Atlantic/Mysterious, 2015), ISBN 978-0-8021-2272-8
- Even Darkness Sings (Pegasus Press, 2018). ISBN 1681778475
