= Beast in View =

1955 novel by Margaret Millar

Beast in View is a psychological suspense horror thriller by Margaret Millar published in 1955 that won the Edgar Award in 1956 and was later adapted for an episode of the television series Alfred Hitchcock Hour in 1964 and remade for the Alfred Hitchcock Presents revival in 1986. It also made the list of The Top 100 Mystery Novels of All Time that was issued in 1995 by the Mystery Writers of America.

== Plot ==
Helen Clarvoe gets a call from someone identifying themselves as 'Evelyn Merrick.' Merrick states that one day she will be famous and her body will be in every art museum in the country. Before hanging up, the caller predicts that Helen will suffer injuries to the forehead and mouth. Later that evening, Helen trips over a chair in her bedroom and suffers the exact injuries that the caller predicted. Scared, Helen calls her father's old acquaintance, Paul Blackshear, and asks him to come over to offer his advice. He is initially reluctant to help, but upon seeing Clarvoe's distress, agrees to help track down Merrick. Blackshear deduces that Merrick is an aspiring model and goes to the Lydia Hudson modelling school. There, Hudson tells Blackshear that Merrick claimed to have modeled for a photographer named Jack Terola. Hudson put her in contact with a painter named Harley Moore.

Bertha Moore, wife of Harley Moore, gets a call from a person identifying herself as Evelyn Merrick. She tells Bertha she is an acquaintance of her husband and Bertha invites her over to see her. Bertha calls Harley to tell him that Merrick is on her way to visit, at which point Harley, who is in the middle of speaking to Blackshear, tells Bertha to lock the doors and not let Evelyn in the house. Bertha does so, but when Evelyn arrives at the house, she taunts Bertha from outside the front door, telling her that Harley is not as noble as she thinks he is as he may have fathered one of Merrick's children. Harley and Blackshear arrive just after Evelyn has left and Blackshear suspects that she is a non-violent sociopath who gets thrills from preying on people's fears.

Blackshear goes to visit Helen's mother, Verna, who tells him that Evelyn is her son Dougie's estranged wife. After Blackshear leaves, Evelyn calls and tells Verna why she believes Dougie has been acting out lately, which causes Verna to faint. Meanwhile, Evelyn attempts to call Helen, but she does not pick up. She then calls Bertha, Verna, and Terola, but discovers they have all either changed their numbers or hang up as soon as they recognize her voice. Angered, she vows to get even with Helen first.

In a dream, Helen experiences a flashback to her high school days where Evelyn attracted all the good looking boys at the school dance whereas Helen hid in the bathroom stall due to her shyness. That night she overheard her parents conversing and agreeing that they wish Helen was more like Evelyn. She is particularly affected when her father says that Helen's punishment is "having to be herself".

Blackshear meets with Evelyn's mother, Annabel. He learns that Evelyn returned from her honeymoon with Dougie prematurely stating she wanted an annulment from Dougie because he was “a pervert” and that he only married her to prove he wasn't a “fairy”. That night, Douglas comes home from his photography class with Terola and, using information provided by Evelyn, Verna deduces that the two of them are in fact lovers. Verna disowns Douglas and leaves the house to confront Terola. After she has left, Dougie commits suicide by slashing his wrists.

Blackshear and Helen blame Evelyn, but realize that they can't go to the police because she hasn't technically committed a crime. They realize that all they can do is to try and learn everything they can about Evelyn and find out if she has committed any actual crimes. Blackshear goes to Terola's studio and finds him dead in his office with a pair of garden shears stuck in his neck. Through a flashback, it is revealed that Evelyn visited Terola and asked him to destroy the original photos he took of her as they didn't do her justice. When he refused and called her crazy, she stabbed him. Evelyn then calls a frantic Verna, telling her that Helen is working in a call house.

Blackshear learns of a friend of Evelyn's named Dr. Clare Lawrence whom he goes to see. He tells her of Evelyn's recent activities and confides in her that he believes she developed multiple personality disorder after the break up of her parents marriage. As Blackshear is questioning Clare, Evelyn walks through the door. Blackshear demands to know where Helen is but Evelyn claims not to have seen her or her family for years.

Helen wakes up in a call house heavily fatigued. She escapes but realizes she is being followed by Evelyn. As she tries to escape she is knocked over by a taxi and Evelyn disappears. She gets the taxi driver to take her back to her hotel where she hides in her room. Evelyn arrives at the hotel along with Blackshear who has deduced that it is in fact Helen who has multiple personality disorder, having hallucinated the phone call from 'Evelyn,' made the fatal phone call to her mother as 'Evelyn,' modeled for and eventually murdered Terola as 'Evelyn,' and went to work at the call house as 'Evelyn,' but drunkenly passed out and woke up as Helen and finally imagined that she was being chased by Evelyn. Blackshear determines that Helen, eternally jealous of Evelyn's popularity and feeling abandoned and betrayed by her parents, developed a separate, evil personality in order to be more like the real Evelyn. Helen quickly regains her memory in her hotel room and is engulfed by guilt. Blackshear and Evelyn go to Helen's room and beg her to come out so they can begin seeking treatment and rehabilitation for her. Their efforts are futile as Helen, faced with the magnitude of what she has done, takes her own life.

== Reception ==
Laura Zornosa of TIME selected the novel for the magazine's list of the "100 Best Mystery and Thriller Books of All Time", writing that the novel "touches on themes of class, isolation, and sexual orientation while fleshing out each of its characters—and it ends with a bang." She argued that it "blazed a trail, sagely predicting and masterfully deploying crime fiction tropes of the new millennium, from an unreliable narrator to its final plot twist." The Salt Lake Tribune called it an "enigmatic novel with enough suspense to satisfy the most placid mystery readers" and wrote that Millar "mixes an abundance of sharp descriptive narrative with six or seven distinct and unusual personalities in this book." Nancy Barr Mavity of the Oakland Tribune wrote that the novel "will have you on to your hair and also your wits" and that Millar's "psychiatric reading here indeed stands her in good stead." However, a reviewer with the Columbia Missourian was less positive, stating that the novel "lags in very few places and the story moves along at a sometimes too rapid pace with many unusual incidents left unexplained." He also criticised the twist, calling it "so startling and unusual" that he "felt he had been tricked by the author into something a little too unrealistic."

Awards
| Preceded by The Long Goodbye by Raymond Chandler | Edgar Allan Poe Award for Best Novel; 1956 | Succeeded by A Dram of Poison by Charlotte Armstrong |
