= Dorothy Salisbury Davis =

American novelist

- Born: Dorothy Margaret Salisbury; April 25, 1916; Chicago, Illinois, U.S.
- Died: August 3, 2014 (aged 98); Palisades, New York, U.S.
- Occupations: Novelist, short story writer
- Spouse: Harry Davis (1946–1993; his death)
- Writing career
- Language: English
- Genre: Psychological suspense
- Notable work: A Gentle Murderer
- Notable awards: Mystery Writers of America: Grand Master Award (1985); Anthony Awards: Lifetime Achievement (1989)

Dorothy Margaret Salisbury Davis (April 25, 1916 − August 3, 2014) was an American crime fiction writer.

== Life and career ==
Davis, an adopted child, was born in Chicago in 1916 and raised in Illinois by Margaret (née Greer) and Alfred J. Salisbury. She worked in Chicago in advertising as a research librarian and as an editor of The Merchandiser, prior to taking up fiction writing. She was married to Harry Davis, the character actor, from 1946 until his death in 1993. She published many novels and short stories. Among them are two sets of series novels, but she mainly wrote stand alone novels. Her novels explore psychological suspense, as was popular for many decades, and has 'an especially strong way of sharing with readers the minds of female characters confronting hazards and crisis'. She was nominated for an Edgar Award eight times, served as President of the Mystery Writers of America in 1956 and was declared a Grand Master by that organization in 1985.

She was on the initial steering committee of Sisters in Crime when it was formed in 1986 and her support was influential in dampening attacks on the new organization.

Davis died on August 3, 2014, at a senior residence facility in Palisades, New York. She had been in failing health for several months prior to her death at the age of 98.

== Published works ==
=== Mrs. Norris Series ===
- Death of an Old Sinner (1957)
- A Gentleman Called (1958)
- Old Sinners Never Die (1959)

=== Julie Hayes Series ===
- A Death in the Life (1976)
- Scarlet Night (1980)
- Lullaby of Murder (1984)
- The Habit of Fear (1987)

=== Novels ===
- The Judas Cat (1949)
- A Gentle Murderer (1951)
- A Town of Masks (1952; reprint edition, 2001)
- The Clay Hand (1952)
- Black Sheep, White Lamb (1964)
- The Pale Betrayer (1965)
- Enemy and Brother (1967)
- God Speed the Night (1969) (with Jerome Ross)
- Where the Dark Streets Go (1970)
- Crime without Murder: An Anthology of Stories (1970) [editor; short story anthology for Mystery Writers of America; contains no stories by Dorothy Salisbury Davis]
- Shock Wave (1974)
- Little Brothers (1974)
- In the Still of the Night (2001)

=== Collections ===
- Tales for a Stormy Night (1984)

=== Anthologies containing stories by Dorothy Salisbury Davis ===
- The Fantastic Universe Omnibus (1960) – contains science fiction story "The Muted Horn"
- Alfred Hitchcock Presents: Tales That Go Bump in the Night (1977) - contains story "By the Scruff of the Soul"
- Great Tales of Mystery and Suspense (1981)
- Murder in Manhattan (1986) – contains "Till Death Do Us Part"
- Murder on the Run (1998) – contains "The Scream"
- Murder Among Friends (2000) – contains "Hank's Tale"
- Sisters on the Case: Celebrating Twenty Years of Sisters in Crime (2007) – contains "Dies Irae"
- On a Raven's Wing: New Tales in Honor of Edgar Allan Poe (2009) – contains "Emily's Time"
- Women on the Case (2009) – contains "Miles to Go"

=== Short stories ===
- Spring Fever (1952)
- A Matter of Public Notice (1957)
- The Muted Horn (1957)
- Mrs. Norris Visits the Library (1959)
- By the Scruff of the Soul (1963)
- Lost Generation (1971)
- Old Friends (1975)
- The Last Party (1980)
- The Devil and His Due (1981)
- Natural Causes (1983)
- Justina (1989)
- A Silver Thimble (1990)
- The Puppet (1991)
- To Forget Mary Ellen (1992)
- Now Is Forever (1994)
- Miles to Go (1996)
- The Scream (1998)
- Hank's Tale (2000)
- The Letter (2002)
