= Elizabeth Fenwick Way =

American writer

- Born: Elizabeth Jane Phillips; April 5, 1916; St. Louis, Missouri, U.S.
- Died: November 20, 1996 (aged 80); Lakewood, Colorado, U.S.
- Other names: Elizabeth Fenwick; E. P. Fenwick

Elizabeth Fenwick Way (April 5, 1916 – November 20, 1996), who wrote as Elizabeth Fenwick and E. P. Fenwick, was an American mystery writer, novelist, and author of books for children. Her 1963 mystery novel The Make-Believe Man was nominated for an Edgar Allan Poe Award by the Mystery Writers of America.

In 1948, Way became friends with writer Flannery O'Connor while they were living at Yaddo, a writers' community in Saratoga Springs, New York. According to O'Connor biographer Melissa Simpson, O'Connor "... cultivated several enduring friendships while at Yaddo, the most notable being her friendship with Elizabeth Fenwick Way ...". When O'Connor left Yaddo for New York City in 1949, Way helped her find an apartment.

Some of Way's manuscripts and papers are held by the Howard Gotlieb Archival Research Center at Boston University.

== Critical reviews ==
Commenting in 1980 on Fenwick's crime fiction, reviewer Carol Cleveland said, "Elizabeth Fenwick's suspense novels are remarkable for the degree of horror they can extract from minimal materials."

In a 1963 review of new children's books, Jane C. Morse praised Fenwick's Cockleberry Castle, saying, ". . . in a story by a new writer in her first book for children Elizabeth Fenwick puts the climax at the right time and in the right place."

In 1968, Kirkus Reviews said of Goodbye, Aunt Elva that it depicts "... the kind of quiet victimization, in old house slippers, which Miss Fenwick manages so well: not her best, but her next best is better than most."

== Bibliography ==
=== Mystery novels ===
As E. P. Fenwick

- The Inconvenient Corpse (1943) OCLC 632487437
- Murder in Haste (1944) OCLC 1743037
- Two Names for Death (1945) OCLC 1675513

As Elizabeth Fenwick

- Poor Harriet (1957) OCLC 1268218
- A Long Way Down (1959) OCLC 8635070
- A Friend of Mary Rose (1961) OCLC 9023426
- A Night Run (1961) OCLC 30213298
- The Silent Cousin (1962) OCLC 704510967
- The Make-Believe Man (1963) OCLC 691927
- Disturbance on Berry Hill (1968) OCLC 437289
- Goodbye, Aunt Elva (1968) OCLC 1035368177
- Impeccable People (1971) OCLC 258355
- The Last of Lysandra (1973) OCLC 699143

=== Novels ===
As Elizabeth Fenwick

- The Long Wing (1947) OCLC 1896933
- Afterwards (1950) OCLC 560025826
- Days of Plenty (1956) OCLC 1680681

=== Juvenile ===
As Elizabeth Fenwick

- Cockleberry Castle (1963) OCLC 679839863
- The Passenger (1967) OCLC 1296710
