= Margaret Millar =

American-Canadian writer

- Born: Margaret Ellis Sturm; February 5, 1915; Berlin (now Kitchener), Ontario
- Died: March 26, 1994 (aged 79); Santa Barbara, California
- Occupation: Novelist
- Spouse: Kenneth Millar (m. 1938; died 1983)
- Children: 1
- Writing career
- Genres: mystery, suspense

Margaret Ellis Millar (née Sturm; February 5, 1915 – March 26, 1994) was a Canadian-American mystery and suspense writer.

Born in Berlin, Ontario (the city would change its name to Kitchener in 1916), she was educated at the Kitchener-Waterloo Collegiate Institute and the University of Toronto. She moved to the United States after marrying Kenneth Millar (better known under the pen name Ross Macdonald). They resided for decades in the city of Santa Barbara, which was often used as a locale in her later novels under the pseudonyms of San Felice or Santa Felicia. The Millars had a daughter, Linda, who died in 1970.

== Styles and themes ==
Millar's books are distinguished by depth of characterization. Often we are shown the rather complex interior lives of the people in her books, with issues of class, insecurity, failed ambitions, loneliness or existential isolation or paranoia often being explored. Unusual people, mild societal misfits or people who don't quite fit into their surroundings are given much interior detail. In some of the books (for example in The Iron Gates) we are given insight into what it feels like to be losing touch with reality and evolving into madness. In general, she is a writer of both expressive description and economy, often ambitious in conveying the sociological context of the stories.

Millar often delivers "surprise endings," but the details that would allow the solution of the surprise have usually been subtly included. Her books focus on subtleties of human interaction and rich psychological detail of individual characters as much as on plot.

Millar was a pioneer in writing about the psychology of women. She wrote about class distinctions, sexual freedom and frustration, and the ambivalence of moral codes depending on a character's economic circumstances. Read against the backdrop of Production Code-era movies of the time, her novels show the reader a different morality than what was portrayed in Hollywood during the 40's and 50's.

It has been argued that Millar "essentially created a new hybrid form of literature: detective literature" in contrast to formulaic genre stories.

Many websites cite her as working as a screenwriter for Warner Brothers just after World War II, but no further details are given as to what she may have worked on, even on imdb.com. Around that time, Warners bought the option on her novel The Iron Gates, with its portrait of a woman descending into madness, but reportedly Bette Davis and other prominent Warner Brothers actresses ultimately turned it down because the memorable protagonist is missing for the last third of the story. The film was never produced. In the early '60s, two of her novels were adapted for the anthology TV series Alfred Hitchcock Presents and Thriller: Beast in View and Rose's Last Summer, which starred Mary Astor.

While she was not known for any one recurring detective (unlike her husband, whose constant gumshoe was Lew Archer), she occasionally used a detective character for more than one novel. Among her occasional ongoing sleuths were Canadians Dr. Paul Prye (her first invention, in the earliest books) and Inspector Sands (a quiet, unassuming Canadian police inspector who might be the most endearing of her recurring inventions). In the California years, a few books featured either Joe Quinn, a rather down-on-his-luck private eye, or Tom Aragon, a young, Hispanic lawyer.

Most of Millar's books are still in print in America. Starting in 2016, Soho Syndicate has published a large selection of omnibus re-issues grouped by theme. Many are available as single ebooks.

== Awards and recognition ==
In 1956, Millar won the Edgar Allan Poe Awards Best Novel award for Beast in View. Two later novels were also nominated for Best Novel. In 1965 she was awarded the Woman of the Year Award by the Los Angeles Times.

In 1983, she was awarded the Grand Master Award by the Mystery Writers of America in recognition of her lifetime achievements.

In 1987, critic and mystery writer H.R.F Keating included Millar's Beast In View in his Crime & Mystery: The 100 Best Books. He wrote:

"Margaret Millar is surely one of late twentieth-century crime fiction's best writers, in the sense that the actual writing in her books, the prose, is of superb quality. On almost every page of this one there is some description, whether of a physical thing or a mental state, that sends a sharp ray of extra meaning into the reader's mind."

== Published works ==
=== "Paul Prye" mystery novels ===
- The Invisible Worm (1941)
- The Weak-Eyed Bat (1942)
- The Devil Loves Me (1942)

=== "Inspector Sands" mystery novels ===
- Wall of Eyes (1943)
- The Iron Gates [Taste of Fears] (1945)

=== "Tom Aragon" mystery novels ===
- Ask for Me Tomorrow (1976)
- The Murder of Miranda (1979)
- Mermaid (1982)

=== Other mystery novels ===
- Fire Will Freeze (1944)
- Do Evil in Return (1950)
- Rose's Last Summer (1952)
- Vanish in an Instant (1952)
- Beast in View (1955) (Edgar Award for Best Novel, 1956)
- An Air That Kills [The Soft Talkers] (1957)
- The Listening Walls (1959)
- A Stranger in My Grave (1960)
- How Like an Angel (1962)
- The Fiend (1964)
- Beyond This Point Are Monsters (1970)
- Banshee (1983)
- Spider Webs (1986)
- The Couple Next Door: Collected Short Mysteries. Ed. Tom Nolan (Crippen & Landru, 2004)

=== Other novels ===
- Experiment in Springtime (1947)
- It's All in the Family (1948)
- The Cannibal Heart (1949)
- Wives and Lovers (1954)

=== Nonfiction ===
- The Birds and the Beasts Were There: The Joys of Birdwatching and Wildlife Observation in California's Richest Habitat (1968) (memoir)

== Birding ==
As evidenced by her birdwatching memoir, birding was an important part of the lives of Margaret Millar and her husband. The couple were founding members of the Santa Barbara Audubon Society. She was a member of the inaugural SBAS Board and Conservation Chair. Millar was an early participant in the American Birding Association's Rare Bird Alert, founded in Santa Barbara in 1963. She also served in the National Audubon Society.
