= Japan Adventure Fiction Association Prize =

Literary award (1982–2012)

The Japan Adventure Fiction Association Prizes (日本冒険小説協会大賞, Nihon Bōken Shōsetsu Kyōkai Taishō) were presented every year by the Japan Adventure Fiction Association (日本冒険小説協会, Nihon Bōken Shōsetsu Kyōkai) (JAFA) from 1982 to 2011. They honor the best in adventure fiction published in the previous year.

The Japan Adventure Fiction Association was founded in 1981 by Chin Naitō (1936–2011) and was disbanded in 2012 after his death.

== Winners ==
	Year	Translated Novel		Japanese Novel	
	Year	Author	Title	Author	Title
1	1982	Robert B. Parker	Early Autumn	Kenzo Kitakata	Nemuri Naki Yoru (眠りなき夜)
2	1983	John le Carré	The Little Drummer Girl	Kenzo Kitakata	Ori (檻); English translation: The Cage, tr. Paul Warham, Vertical, 2006
3	1984	Robert Ludlum	The Bourne Identity	Yoichi Funado	Yamaneko no Natsu (山猫の夏)
4	1985	James Crumley	Dancing Bear	Tatsuo Shimizu	Somuite Kokyo (背いて故郷)
5	1986	Dick Francis	Proof	Go Osaka	Kadisu no Akai Hoshi (カディスの赤い星); English translation: The Red Star of Cádiz, tr. Usha Jayaraman, Kurodahan Press, 2008
6	1987	Bob Langley	Traverse of the Gods	Yoichi Funado	Takeki Hakobune (猛き箱舟)
7	1988	Trevanian	The Main	Yoichi Funado	Densetsu Naki Chi (伝説なき地)
8	1989	Stephen Hunter	The Day Before Midnight	Joh Sasaki	Etorofu Hatsu Kinkyu-den (エトロフ発緊急電)
9	1990	Wilbur Smith	The Eye of the Tiger	Tatsuo Shimizu	Yukizuri no Machi (行きずりの街)
10	1991	Bernard Cornwell	Sea Lord	Yoichi Funado	Suna no Kuronikuru (砂のクロニクル)
11	1992	Clive Cussler	Sahara	Kaoru Takamura	Riviera o Ute (リヴィエラを撃て)
12	1993	Dean Koontz	Watchers	Kaoru Takamura	Makusu no Yama (マークスの山)
13	1994	Robert R. McCammon	Swan Song	Joh Sasaki	Sutokkuhorumu no Misshi (ストックホルムの密使)
14	1995	Robert R. McCammon	Boy's Life	Yoichi Funado	Ezochi Bekken (蝦夷地別件)
15	1996	Dick Francis	Come to Grief	Seishu Hase	Fuyajo (不夜城)
16	1997	Glenn Meade	Snow Wolf	Baku Yumemakura	Kamigami no Itadaki (神々の山嶺); Graphic novel adaptation (English translation): The Summit of the Gods (illustrated by Jiro Taniguchi. Fanfare/Ponent Mon. 2009–)
17	1998	Stephen Hunter	Black Light	Miyuki Miyabe	Riyu (理由)
18	1999	Stephen Hunter	Time to Hunt	Harutoshi Fukui	Bokoku no Ijisu (亡国のイージス)
19	2000	Lee Child	Killing Floor	Arimasa Osawa	Kokoro de wa Omosugiru (心では重すぎる)
20	2001	Boston Teran	God Is A Bullet	Arimasa Osawa	Yamisaki Annainin (闇先案内人)
21	2002	Stephen Hunter	Pale Horse Coming	Harutoshi Fukui	Shusen no Rorerai (終戦のローレライ); Film adaptation: Lorelei: The Witch of the Pacific Ocean (2005)
22	2003	Victor Gischler	Gun Monkeys	Yoichi Funado	Yume wa Arechi o (夢は荒れ地を)
23	2004	James Crumley	The Final Country	Toshihiko Yahagi	The Wrong Goodbye (ロング・グッドバイ, Rongu Guddobai)
24	2005	James Carlos Blake	A World of Thieves	Ken Nishimura	Goka (劫火)
25	2006	Dick Francis	Under Orders	Arimasa Osawa	Shinjuku-Zame 9: Ōkami-Bana (新宿鮫IX 狼花)
26	2007	Jeffery Deaver	The Cold Moon	Joh Sasaki	Keikan no Chi (警官の血; lit. The Policeman's Lineage)
27	2008	Tom Rob Smith	Child 44	Akio Higuchi	Yakusoku no Chi (約束の地)
28	2009	Don Winslow	The Power of the Dog	Yumeaki Hirayama	Diner (ダイナー, Daina)
29	2010	Don Winslow	The Winter of Frankie Machine	Ken Nishimura	Nokori-Bi (残火)
30	2011	Jeffery Deaver	Carte Blanche	Arimasa Osawa	Shinjuku-Zame 10: Kizuna Kairō (新宿鮫X 絆回廊)
30	2011	Jeffery Deaver	Carte Blanche	Ken Nishimura	Chi no Soko no Yama (地の底のヤマ)

== See also ==
- Mystery Writers of Japan Award
- Japanese detective fiction
