= Maltese Falcon Society =

Literary society

The Maltese Falcon Society is an organization for admirers of Dashiell Hammett, his 1930 novel The Maltese Falcon, and hardboiled mystery books and writers in general. Founded in San Francisco in 1981, the organization is no longer active in the United States; however, a chapter in Japan has been active continuously since 1982. The Japanese branch of the society presents the Falcon Award, Japan's highest honor in the mystery field, to honor the best hardboiled mystery novel published in Japan.

== Beginnings ==
The Maltese Falcon Society was founded in San Francisco on May 20, 1981 by literary historian and biographer Don Herron and private investigator Jayson Wechter. The society's first meeting was held at John's Grill, a restaurant where Dashiell Hammett ate and which he featured in The Maltese Falcon. The speakers at that first meeting were David Fechheimer, a Hammett researcher and private investigator, and E. Hoffmann Price, a pulp fiction author.

The society opened chapters in New York and Japan. By 1982, the society had 110 members in San Francisco, 55 in Japan, and 50 in New York. As its official toast, the society adopted the one used by Sam Spade in Chapter 2 of The Maltese Falcon: "Success to crime."

== Activities ==
William Nadel of the New York chapter conducted a Dashiell Hammett/Thin Man walking tour of Manhattan. Founded by mystery writer Jiro Kimura, the Japanese chapter produced a newsletter called The Maltese Falcon Flyer ten times a year, and in 1983 began to present the annual Falcon Award. Co-founder Herron began to conduct the Dashiell Hammett Tour in San Francisco, the longest running literary tour in the United States.

The San Francisco chapter meetings heard presentations by mystery novelists Julie Smith, Charles Willeford, Stephen Greenleaf, and Joe Gores. Other speakers included Hammett biographers Diane Johnson and William F. Nolan, bounty hunter Tiny Boyles, people who knew Hammett including Jerome Weidman, and coroners, crime reporters, FBI agents, and bail bondsmen. The San Francisco chapter also staged special events, such as a "shootout" conducted at the 1981 Marin Designers Showcase in Mill Valley, California, which resulted in the police being called.

The New York chapter became inactive in the late 1980s. The fifth anniversary meeting of the San Francisco chapter was held May 27, 1986, on the 92nd anniversary of Hammett's birth, and it was the chapter's last. The author's daughter Jo Hammett was the final speaker.

By 1990, only the Japanese chapter of The Maltese Falcon Society was still active. In 2006, the Japanese chapter produced a large-format softcover book in Japanese, The Complete Maltese Falcon Flyer 1982-2006, which includes the first 250 issues of the newsletter with new introductions by Don Herron and other writers. In 2009, with about 90 members, the Japanese chapter continues to hold meetings in Tokyo and Osaka, to produce The Maltese Falcon Flyer, and to present the Falcon Award.

== Falcon Awards ==
The Falcon Award is awarded by the members of the Maltese Falcon Society of Japan for the best hardboiled novel published in Japan. The winning author receives a certificate of merit and a falcon sculpture crafted in wood.

- 1983 Early Autumn by Robert B. Parker
- 1984 The Old Dick by L.A. Morse
- 1985 The Wrong Case by James Crumley
- 1986 Hammett by Joe Gores
- 1987 When the Sacred Ginmill Closes by Lawrence Block
- 1988 Hard Line by Michael Z. Lewin
- 1989 Strega by Andrew Vachss
- 1990 Watashi ga Koroshita Shojo (lit. A Girl Who I Killed) by Ryo Hara (French title: La petite fille que j'ai tuée)
- 1991 "F" Is for Fugitive by Sue Grafton
- 1992 A Ticket to the Boneyard by Lawrence Block
- 1993 Book Case by Stephen Greenleaf
- 1994 A Cool Breeze on the Underground by Don Winslow
- 1995 The Black Ice by Michael Connelly
- 1996 no winner
- 1997 White Jazz by James Ellroy
- 1998 no winner
- 1999 The Big Blowdown by George Pelecanos
- 2000-2004 no winner
- 2005 The Wrong Goodbye by Toshihiko Yahagi (trans. Alfred Birnbaum, MacLehose Press, 2021)
- 2006 Lost Light by Michael Connelly
- 2007 Under the Skin by James Carlos Blake
- 2008 No Country for Old Men by Cormac McCarthy
- 2009 Winter and Night by S.J. Rozan
- 2010 The Power of the Dog by Don Winslow
- 2011 The Winter of Frankie Machine by Don Winslow
- 2012 no winner
- 2013 no winner
- 2014 Live by Night by Dennis Lehane
- 2015 Ghostman by Roger Hobbs
- 2016 Missing: New York by Don Winslow
- 2017 Kurai Etsuryu (lit. Dark Overflow) by Nanami Wakatake
- 2018 The Promise by Robert Crais
- 2019 The Force by Don Winslow
- 2020 Down the River Unto the Sea by Walter Mosley
- 2021 Breaking Point by C. J. Box
- 2022 Private Eyes by Chi Wei-Jan
- 2023 Paper Son by S.J. Rozan
- 2024 Razorblade Tears by S. A. Cosby
- 2025 All The Sinners Bleed by S. A. Cosby
