= Batman: The Ultimate Evil =

Novel by Andrew Vachss

- Cover of Batman: The Ultimate Evil (1995).
- Author: Andrew Vachss
- Cover artist: Chip Kidd
- Language: English
- Genre: Superhero fiction
- Publisher: Warner Books
- Publication date: November 1995
- Publication place: United States
- Pages: 196 pg
- ISBN: 978-0-446-51912-0
- OCLC: 222098558

Batman: The Ultimate Evil is a novel written by Andrew Vachss and published in 1995 by the Warner Aspect imprint of Warner Books. Vachss was an attorney specializing in child abuse cases, as well as a crime novelist best known for his series of books featuring the character Burke, a private investigator who fights against sexual predators. A representative from DC Comics approached Vachss about the possibility of writing a novel featuring Batman. Viewing this as an opportunity to reach a completely different audience, Vachss agreed and wrote a draft. He continued with his themes concerning child sexual abuse and explored the topic of child sex tourism. The publisher required Vachss to follow certain rules, like making a clear distinction between fiction and reality and prohibiting the Batman character from killing, cursing, or having sex.

In the story, billionaire Bruce Wayne, who as a child witnessed the murder of his parents Thomas and Martha Wayne, encounters the social worker Debra Kane, who takes Wayne to check up on her clients: he sees clear cases of child abuse and brave but futile resistance to it. Wayne's loyal butler, Alfred Pennyworth, gives him the secret files from his mother's investigation of a child sex ring, which led to her and her husband's murder, illuminating the darkest mystery of Wayne's childhood. As Batman, Wayne reopens his mother's investigation and, through a series of informants, is led to a child sex tourism syndicate using the southeast-Asian country of Udon Khai. Batman travels to Udon Khai and, with the help of a local rebel force of guerrilla fighters, topples the kingpin who controls the industry. In the process, he avenges the murder of his parents. The book ends with a non-fiction essay, by journalist David Hechler, entitled "Child Sex Tourism".

== Background ==
At the time of publication, Vachss worked as an attorney, in New York City, specializing in child abuse cases; he also had a career as a novelist. The duality of Vachss' work as a lawyer prosecuting and defending real cases and as a crime fiction author writing about fictional criminals resulted in Vachss being compared to the Bruce Wayne/Batman character. Vachss' eighth novel, Footsteps of the Hawk, in the Burke series featuring a vigilante private investigator of child abuse cases, was released just two months before the publication of Batman: The Ultimate Evil. He had wanted to approach the topic of sex tourism in southeast Asia, but had been unable to find a way for the Burke character to go there; the Batman character offered the chance for him to write about the topic.

Vachss had previously worked with Dark Horse Comics to produce a ten-issue series (1992–1993) titled Hard Looks. Steve Korte of DC Comics' book division approached Vacchs with the possibility of a partnership. Vachss was hesitant about using creative property that belonged to someone else but recognized the opportunity to reach a new audience. He started writing the novel, on speculation, and DC Comics eventually agreed to the project, allowing Vachss to take some creative liberties.

== Plot summary ==
The apartment was right off Gotham Drive, just inside the diamond-spine of the great city. The Batman watched from one rooftop away. Watched the light go off as the apartment dropped into darkness. Something he didn't understand pulled him magnetically to that spot. He knew who lived there—the incest offender who told Debra Kane how much he loved his little girl. But what was he doing... "No!" he said to himself. "I took an oath. The authorities already know about him. I can't just ..."

— Batman: The Ultimate Evil, pages 39–40.

At a party, Bruce Wayne meets Debra Kane, a caseworker with Child Protective Services. Intrigued with Debra's view of crimes against children in Gotham City, he asks to join her while she visits clients. She agrees and shows him the varying degrees of child abuse she encounters in the course of her job. Wanting to understand the factors behind child abuse, Bruce, as Batman, breaks into Hellgate Prison and talks with an informant who points him to a child pornography and prostitution ring. Bruce's butler Alfred Pennyworth reveals that Bruce's mother, Martha Wayne, had been secretly investigating a similar child sex ring, and that the sex traffickers ordered the murders of Bruce's parents in order to silence her.

Using his mother's case files, Bruce finds a connection to a Southeast Asian country named Udon Khai. Using the assumed name Big Jack Hollister, Batman travels to San Francisco to meet a contact who explains how the sex tours to Udon Khai operate. As Hollister, Batman travels to Udon Khai, where he meets Rhama, a local translator hired by Alfred. Rhama shows him life in Udon Khai and how the child sex tourism has affected its population. As Batman, Bruce introduces himself to Rhama, saying that Hollister sent him. Batman and Rhama confront a man who buys and sells children and they rescue a girl who had been sold by her family. They return the child to her village and find that her father had sold her so that the rest of the poverty-stricken family could survive. The population mistakes Batman for a warrior of legend who would break the barriers that confine the population. Believing this to be their chance for a revolution to overthrow the military dictatorship, a rebel group joins Batman in storming the headquarters of the kingpin who controls the sex tourism industry. Though Batman returns to Gotham, the rebels continue to dismantle the sex tour industry and overthrow the dictator of Udon Khai.

The novel ends with Bruce Wayne maintaining his friendship with Debra Kane as well as recruiting her as one of his informants as Batman, and also deciding to include child molesters as part of his quarry in his war on crime.

== Publication ==
The 45,000-word novel was released in November 1995, simultaneous with an abridged audiobook and a two-issue graphic novel. All three versions included a nonfiction essay about child prostitution in Thailand, titled "Child Sex Tourism", by investigative journalist David Hechler. The audiobook featured Tony Roberts, whose performance on the three-hour, two-cassette recording received a positive review from Trudi Miller Rosenblum of Billboard, who wrote that Roberts does "an outstanding job creating a distinctive voice for each character and effectively portraying Batman's complex psyche". The comic book adaption was drafted by Neal Barrett, Jr. with art by Denys Cowan. The novel was published by the Warner Aspect imprint of the Warner Books and promoted by Vachss with a book tour and as a guest at the 1995 San Diego Comic-Con. Vachss used the promotion of the book to also raise awareness of child abuse and advocate a boycott of manufactured goods from Thailand. He declared that "three years from now, if there isn't a boycott of Thailand, then this book is a cosmic failure". Vachss supported Don't! Buy! Thai!, which believed that "if Thailand sells its children for money, then the only thing that will stop them is the loss of money".

== Style and themes ==
The publishers required that Vachss follow certain rules, including prohibiting the Batman character from killing, cursing, or having sex, and keeping a clear distinction between fiction and reality. For example, while Vachss wanted to write about Thailand, he created a fictional country named Udon Khai which had many similarities with Thailand, although Udon Khai is described as being dominated by a lone kingpin who controls the country's one-industry economy based on sex tourism while Thailand's tourism economy, which includes sex tourism, is part of an economic development strategy enabled by international development agencies. Vachss deviated from Batman canon by having the Wayne family butler, Alfred Pennyworth, reveal to Bruce Wayne that his mother, Martha, was a sociologist who was secretly investigating a child pornography ring. In Vachss' novel, the Waynes were not the victims of a random crime; instead, Martha was targeted for assassination. One reviewer compared the characterization of Batman as "the same brooding, handsome, rich character that Val Kilmer played [in Batman Forever]" but with the "gothic presence of the older Batman seen in 1940s movie serials". More complex analysis compared the story to an "18th-century contes philosophiques in which the dark irrationality of the Greek gods has been flattened out into tidy didactic instruction".

Vachss said that "writing is my way of preaching. For me, it's always, always the message. The plot is something I contrive to deliver the message. You've got to have enough narrative force to get people to finish the book, but if you can give them an exciting story, you can always make your points". He stated that "the whole point of the book is to raise awareness about the kiddie-sex tourism business in Thailand". Though the story uses more realism than the escapism typically associated with superhero fiction, Vachss did end the book with endorsements of two real non-profit groups; Don't! Buy! Thai! and End Child Prostitution in Asian Tourism. The writing is not subtle, as Vachss noted "if you don't get angry, you're not going to do anything". Understanding that the likely readers were young males with short attention spans, Vachss tried to be dramatic by using what author Adam Begley calls "a motivational hat trick: sympathy for the victims, revenge, and a family calling".

A major theme in the book is the characterization of child abuse. The story follows Bruce Wayne as he learns about the different categories of child abuse, from the ignorant to the incapable to those who do it for pleasure. Batman, whose motivation is to prevent crimes like the murder of his parents, is contrasted against a social worker whose motivation is protecting children; Batman realizes that throughout his career he had been fighting criminals, not crime. Vachss asserts that "child protection and crime prevention are the same thing"; he believes that child abuse is never just a random crime but is done with intent. While Vachss warns that those abused can become future abusers, he also states that "abuse can push two similarly maltreated children in opposite directions. One incest victim becomes a promiscuous adult, another never engages in sex again. ... If you excuse serial killer because he was tortured as a child, you disrespect the thousands of children who were treated worse and never imitated their oppressor".

== Reception ==
The book was described as a "slim, vivid novel" with a "very simple" and "fast paced" plot line. A review in The Washington Times was positive: "With a plot that takes Batman very seriously — and makes him very human — and a dismaying amount of information on the sexual exploitation of children for profit, this novel makes an ineradicable impression". Likewise, another reviewer found it "an engaging and disturbing one-night read that's all the more astonishing because Vachss manages to explore and make his points about a wholly depressing topic without driving your moods into the sewer". Roger Catlin in the Hartford Courant said that "Vachss' bold, simple prose is well suited to his story. He's good at making Batman's various devices — the Batmobile, computers, flying gizmos — come to life with his cool description".

A review in The New York Times noted that the basic premise is a good idea, but "studded as it is with undigested chunks of scientific jargon, sociology-speak and polemical rhetoric Batman: The Ultimate Evil misses out almost completely on the pure pulp thrills that lie at the heart of its title character's appeal". In the St. Petersburg Times, Adam Begley also noted the use of what he called "techno-babble". In The Washington Post, Jack Womack wrote that Vachss describes the Batmobile "lovingly yet gnomically, as if a Motor Trend review had been translated into Slovakian by someone more familiar with Czech" and concluded that the novel was "as satisfying — aesthetically, ethically, morally — as a pulse-pounding yarn in which pulp-fiction hero Doc Savage ransacks the shantytowns of South America in a terribly successful search for Doc Mengele". In Kirkus Reviews, the story was compared to a generic "Destroy All Exploiters" video game where Batman "disposes of each lower-level pimp, then moves up to the next level". Sybil Steinberg in Publishers Weekly noted that "while no classic, this is likely the most stylish adaptation yet of a comic-book figure, its cold stiletto prose and white-hot passions lifting it leagues above recent Spider-man and Incredible Hulk offerings. It's also Vachss' best work since Shella". Both the Library Journal and Booklist predicted heavy demand for it at public libraries.
