= Sean Parlaman =

Griffith Simmons Parlaman III (30 October 1958 – 23 November 2002), who often referred to himself as "Sean Parlaman", was a long-time college student and anti-trafficking activist who sought to raise awareness regarding the trafficking and prostitution of children into Thailand. Parlaman was born in Los Angeles County, California, to Griffith Mead Parlaman (20 April 1923 – 22 October 1991) and Doris V. Simmons Parlaman (22 November 1923 – 11 February 2007); he fell to his death in Jomtien, Pattaya, Thailand. Parlaman created websites to represent his projects, such as the now-defunct capcat.org.

== Beginnings ==
During his time in college he was able to secure government grants, to become a member of the Oregon steering committee of the 2000 Green Party Presidential campaign of Ralph Nader, and to get permission from Stephen King to make Stud City, a short, independent sequel to Stand by Me.

== Activism ==
Parlaman moved to Thailand and continued his activism. For example, Parlaman wrote: "At an age when we would regard them as still being children, over a thousand young girls from northern Thailand are being lured every year into prostitution. Girls, as young as 10, are being sold to the brothels of Bangkok, other Thai cities and overseas." However, despite his efforts to raise awareness of local establishments' engaging in child prostitution, he was accused by those same institutions of being a pedophile himself. On 30 September 2002, living in Thailand, Parlaman was charged with molesting a 12-year-old boy, but released on bail by the local magistrate due to lack of evidence, as the sole incriminating evidence against him was a bruise on the boy's neck. On 23 November 2002, after another accusation, Parlaman was due to accompany police officers to their station for further questioning. Instead, he jumped, fell, or was thrown to the street from his apartment building in the city of Pattaya, thereby closing the applicable case. Parlaman was pronounced dead on the scene.

=== Controversies ===
Sean Parlaman had a feud with Don't! Buy! Thai! accusing their campaigners of being fundamentalist Christians, right-wing bigots, and pedophiles. Don't! Buy! Thai! was a campaign initiated in the early 1990s by child welfare advocate and author Andrew Vachss to boycott goods and services produced in Thailand until its government introduced formal and practical reforms to significantly curtail the prostitution of children.
