= Night Boat (disambiguation) =

"Night Boat" is a 1981 album track by Duran Duran.

Night Boat may also refer to:

- Night Boats, 2012 drama film
- The Night Boat, 1920 musical
- The Night Boat (book), 1980 novel by Robert McCammon

== See also ==
- "Night Boat to Cairo", 1979 single by Madness
- Night Boat to Dublin, 1946 thriller film
- Night Boat to Tangier, 2019 novel by Kevin Barry
