= Swan Song (McCammon novel) =

1987 novel by Robert R. McCammon

- Mass Market Paperback cover
- Author: Robert R. McCammon
- Cover artist: Rowena Morrill
- Language: English
- Genre: Post-apocalyptic, horror
- Publisher: Pocket Books
- Publication date: 1 June 1987
- Publication place: United States
- Media type: Print (Mass Market Paperback)
- Pages: 960
- ISBN: 0-671-74103-9

Swan Song is a 1987 post-apocalyptic horror novel by American novelist Robert R. McCammon. Published June 1, 1987, the novel describes the aftermath of a nuclear war that provokes an evolution in humankind. Swan Song won the 1987 Bram Stoker award, tying with Stephen King's Misery.

== Plot ==
Tensions between the USA and the USSR peak, and the two superpowers engage in nuclear war. In hours, the USA is reduced to a barren wasteland covered by the snows of nuclear winter. The President, blaming himself for what happened, prepares some system known only as "Talons", but his plane crashes before he can activate it. Many individuals are caught up in the onset of nuclear war: Josh Hutchins and a young girl named Sue "Swan" Wanda, take cover in the basement of a Kansas gas station; a homeless woman named Sister Creep miraculously escapes an explosion in the subway tunnels of NYC; Colonel Macklin and teenager Roland Croninger are trapped in a collapsed fallout shelter in Idaho.

Amid the ruins of a jewelry store, Sister discovers an unusual glass ring with precious stones melted into it and soon learns that it has supernatural properties, showing the holder visions of a better world. Sister and new companion Artie Wisco find themselves pursued by a demonic shapeshifter known as "The Man with the Scarlet Eye", who seeks to destroy the ring.

Josh and Swan, wandering through post-apocalyptic America, meet Leona Skelton, who predicts via tarot cards that Swan will have to face the Devil. Sister and Artie meet mountain man Paul Thorsen, the leader of a small group of survivors, and continue their journey in his truck. Macklin and Roland reach the Great Salt Lake and discover a relatively well-maintained and guarded camp led by the narcissistic Kempka. Macklin and Roland capture drug addict Sheila and use her supply to bargain with Kempka and move into the camp. After Roland kills Kempka when the latter tries to rape him, Macklin assumes command and introduces military discipline to the camp, establishing the "Army of Excellence" (AoE). Meanwhile, Josh, Swan, and Leona find themselves trapped in a former K-Mart taken over by escaped psychiatric hospital patients; Leona sacrifices herself to allow Josh and Swan to escape from the group's leader, Alvin Magrim. The pair then meets Rusty, the last survivor of a traveling circus.

Seven years pass; the clouds do not dissipate, radioactive fallout persists, and many survivors suffer from "Job's Mask", a strange skin disease that obscures the head and face with fleshy tissue. The AoE, now a ferocious army of 4,000 soldiers (and including Alvin), moves across America and ravages settlements. The AoE goes to war against an equally armed and fanatical group, the "American Allegiance"; its leader, the self-proclaimed prophet Brother Timothy, is convinced that God lives on Warwick Mountain in West Virginia. Sister and Paul wander the Midwest and meet a group of orphans led by a teenage boy, Robin Oakes. Josh, Swan, and Rusty wander the country as a troupe of itinerant entertainers; Swan is blinded by Job's Mask, but shows miraculous new powers by reviving dead plants. Sister and Paul are guided toward Swan by Sister's visions, and are still pursued by the Man with the Scarlet Eye.

The parties meet at Mary's Rest. Sister determines that she has reached her goal and hands the ring to Swan, who is greeted by visions of a blooming paradise. Her Job's Mask crumbles, revealing a beautiful face. Gradually, other characters lose their Job's Masks, and beneath them are transformed faces that are beautiful or ugly, depending on the person's spiritual qualities. Swan grows an entire cornfield despite the coldness and lack of sunlight, allowing Mary's Rest to thrive. The Man with the Scarlet Eye leads the AoE to Mary's Rest and attempts to kill Swan, but fails. However, the settlement's inhabitants are defeated and captured, and Sister manages to hide the ring.

The AoE sets out on a campaign toward Warwick Mountain to meet the mysterious "God", who is revealed to be the former United States President. Within his bunker is the control panel for Talons, a doomsday device capable of completely eradicating the Earth's populace by destroying the polar icecaps and flooding the planet. The President activates Talons and is killed by the Man with the Scarlet Eye. Roland tries to kill Swan, but is attacked by Macklin, and both men kill each other. Swan determines the deactivation password and averts disaster. The group leaves the bunker, locks it, and discards the key. The Sun appears in the sky for the first time in seven years. The AoE falls into disarray, and the Man with the Scarlet Eye loses his authority over it. While Josh returns to Mary's Rest, Swan embarks on a journey across America to heal the world with her powers.

== Characters ==
The story follows the individual journeys of several major characters, combining them at the climax:

- Sue Wanda Prescott, or Swan, the eponymous young woman who has an empathic ability with plant life, allowing her to accelerate the growth of or resurrect dead plants through physical contact.
- Josh Hutchins, a wrestler stage-named Black Frankenstein, and later the Masked Mephisto. He's Swan's protector and father-figure throughout the book.
- Sister Creep, later simply referred to as "Sister", a formerly deranged "bag lady" who survived a nuclear attack on New York City deep underground in the New York City Subway system. The guardian of the glass ring and late surrogate mother to Swan.
- Colonel Macklin, a survivalist and former U.S. Air Force P.O.W. contracted by investors to oversee a mountain bunker, inside of which he survives during the nuclear attack.
- Roland Croninger, a young boy brought to Macklin's mountain bunker by his parents. Through horrendous circumstances, and while under Macklin's tutelage, Roland transforms from an innocent child into a cold-blooded killer who lives to serve Macklin, and later 'Friend'.
- The Man with the Scarlet Eye, Friend, Doyle Holland, or The Man of Many Faces, an incarnation of demonic evil (allusions to the Devil). He is seen throughout the book as being a creature of chaos. He has the ability to shape-shift, manipulation, mind control, super strength, and the ability to control animals. It's suggested that he caused the nuclear war and other acts of terrorism for his own amusement. He sees the glass ring that Sister carries, and Swan, as cruelties because they bring hope.

== Adaptation ==
In January 2024, it was announced that the novel would be adapted as a television series with Greg Nicotero writing and directing the pilot episode.

== Awards ==
Swan Song won a 1988 Bram Stoker Award for Best Novel and the 1994 Japan Adventure Fiction Association Prize for Best Translated Novel.

== See also ==
- The Stand, a similar post-apocalyptic horror/science fiction novel by Stephen King.
- Pink World by Planet P Project, a 1984 concept-album with many similarities to the story.
