= The Wolf's Hour =

1989 book by Robert R. McCammon

- First edition
- Author: Robert R. McCammon
- Cover artist: Rowena Morrill
- Language: English
- Genre: War, horror, werewolf fiction
- Publisher: Pocket Books
- Publication date: March 1989
- Publication place: United States
- Media type: Print (hardback & paperback)
- Pages: 480 (hardback edition)
- ISBN: 0-246-13456-9 (hardback edition)
- OCLC: 59782304

The Wolf's Hour is a 1989 World War II horror novel by American writer Robert R. McCammon. It is the story of a British secret agent who goes behind German lines to stop a secret weapon from being launched against the Allies. This agent is a werewolf. The book also includes some of the agent's history, namely how he became a werewolf.

== Plot ==
In 1942, British spy Michael Gallatin successfully steals German staff maps in North Africa for the British army, who intend to intercept the advance of Erwin Rommel's Afrika Korps in the region. Joining his friend Countess Margritta in Cairo, Gallatin is attacked by a German assassin. He narrowly escapes death by strangulation thanks to his lycanthropic power. Having the gift of transforming into a large black wolf with green eyes, he succeeds in killing the assassin, but Margritta is unable to escape and is shot in the head. Tired of the war and feeling responsible for Margritta's death, Michael Gallatin retires to Wales.

Two years later, Gallatin is approached by officers who ask him to return to duty. While the Allies are in the midst of organizing a major invasion, disturbing news has reached them from one of their spies in Paris, who holds important information on a large-scale Nazi operation. Refusing the mission at first, Gallatin ends up accepting when he learns that the traitor Harry Sandler, responsible for Margritta's death, has been seen in Berlin.

Parachuted near Paris, Gallatin must reach the capital to make contact with the spy Adam, who is under the surveillance of the Gestapo. Gallatin contacts Adam through a Nazi deserter called “Mouse”. He slips a note in Adams pocket that informs Adam to go to an opera at the third act, so Gallatin can receive the information. The Gestapo had followed Adam and shoot him in the head just after the information was disclosed to Michael. Michael escapes by faking suicide using cyanide; he does not swallow the pill. This fake-out allots him time to turn into a werewolf and he kills the fleeing Gestapo. Gallatin and Mouse must make their way east to Berlin, the heart of the Nazis lair, in an attempt to foil a top-secret Nazi plan, “Iron Fist”.
