= Satori (Winslow novel) =

2011 historical crime novel by Don Winslow

- Author: Don Winslow
- Language: English
- Genre: Historical novel
- Publisher: Grand Central Publishing
- Publication date: 2011
- Publication place: United States
- Media type: Print (Hardback)
- Pages: 504
- ISBN: 978-0-446-56192-1
- LC Class: PS3573.I5326 38 210
- Preceded by: Shibumi

Satori is a 2011 historical novel by American writer Don Winslow. The novel features the same central protagonist, assassin Nicholaï Hel, as Trevanian's novel Shibumi. However it's not a prequel to but tells instead of a largely unexplained period within that particular novel. In Satori he carries out his first assassination under pressure from American agencies, for which among other things, he is to be rewarded with freedom and given citizenship of Costa Rica.

== Plot ==
Nicholaï Hel and the French woman Solange Picard are brought together by somebody who designs missions for an American secret service. Nicholaï Hel is the only man who can possibly carry out a certain covert operation in Beijing. When Solange Picard has prepared him, he must leave her for his mission. Once he is gone, Solange gets routed. Thanks to the training she provided he can carry out the assassination and also afterwards leave China.

The American secret service needs to seek him out for they have to fear he turns against them. Again they depend on Solange Picard because his evident love for her makes her the only possible and all the more irresistible bait. Against all odds they become a couple until her death tears them apart.

== Structure ==
The storyline consists of three parts. Don Winslow tells the story in chronological order. The two chapters with biographical flashbacks are hardly more than embellishments or at best literary rhetoric.

=== Part One ===
Japan:
Nicholaï Hel is released from prison. He is given a new identity as a French arms dealer and plastic surgery. Solange makes him "Michel Guibert" and is the first person who sees his new face. After she has even taught him to make love like a Frenchman he must go on a suicide mission. She reckons she has therefore lost him like she already lost her first love during World War II. (Chapter 1–16)

=== Part Two ===
China:
Nicholaï Hel uses his bogus identity successfully to approach and finally kill his target, the Soviet commissioner Yuri Voroshenin. But he is shot in the process and betrayed by somebody within the American secret service. When Wu Zhong, a former Bajiquan instructor of the KMT is about to crush him, the monk Xue Win can scarcely save him at last minute. (Chapter 17–86)

=== Part Three ===
Vietnam:
General Liu wants him to deliver arms to the Viet Minh as “Michel Guibert”. Longing to meet Solange again Nicholaï complies and eventually reaches Saigon, which is coined by French control. When he arrives, Solange is already there. Nicholaï's rival is an emperor but still cannot stop himself from reaching out for her. The SDECE strongly advises Nicholaï to leave Saigon while the Unione Corse already makes attempts on his life and even assigns the killer known as "the Cobra". Finally he is once more completely in Solange's hands. (Chapter 87–164)

== Characters ==
=== Nicholaï Hel ===
Nicholaï is a man seeking for Satori which means freedom and peace of mind. When Solange dies she has given him Satori. The reason is implicit since the song "Me and Bobby McGee" already defined freedom as nothing left to lose.

=== Solange Picard ===
Solange has lost her first love because he was murdered by Nazis. She had her first sex at all with his murderer because she had to pretend to be a whore in order to get close enough to him to cut his throat. Finally she gets obsessed with a contemporary French film: Casque d'or. As she tells Nicholaï and as his friend de Lhandes later can observe (chapter 149) she cries each time again when Marie (Simone Signoret) must watch her lover dying.

Her other trauma is disclosed in chapter 140: Neither her beauty nor her experience seem to be enough for her lovers to find her intriguing forever. She feels they always eventually “start to find fault” and correct her grammar before they finally begin to get interested in other women. Only Nicholaï, he who came to her to receive corrections, is different.

=== Haverford ===
Nicholaï's handler Haverford, a war hero and man of honour, is fluent in three foreign languages (French, Japanese, Vietnamese). He had the idea to release Nicholaï. His plans are doublecrossed by traitors within the secret service.

=== de Lhandes ===
The Belgian private detective de Lhandes suffers with a genetic disorder comparable to the famous French artist Henri de Toulouse-Lautrec. Nicholaï makes him his friend by inviting him into a brothel. In Satori, he uses dialog more in keeping with Beñat Le Cagot of the original novel, than “The Gnome” whom he becomes.

== Film adaptation ==
In July 2012 it was reported on the occasion of an interview with Don Winslow that "Warner Brothers picked up his Go-master/hit-man novel Satori as a vehicle for Leonardo DiCaprio." The same month Don Winslow was also quoted having said he had produced "another screenplay with Shane Salerno called Satori with Leonardo DiCaprio." Soon after, Deadline Hollywood reported Warner Brothers were "eyeing a 2013 start for Winslow’s spy thriller Satori to star Leonardo DiCaprio as assassin Nicholai Hel."
