= Kenzo Kitakata =

Japanese novelist (born 1947)

- Born: October 26, 1947 (age 78); Karatsu, Saga, Japan
- Occupations: Author, novelist
- Writing career
- Period: 1970–present
- Genres: Hardboiled, historical fiction
- Notable awards: Mystery Writers of Japan Award (1985)

Kenzo Kitakata (北方 謙三, Kitakata Kenzō; born October 26, 1947) is a Japanese novelist, especially known for his hardboiled novels. He studied law at Chuo University in the early 1970s. He served as the 10th President of the Mystery Writers of Japan from 1997 to 2001.

== Works in English translation ==
Hardboiled novels

- Ashes (original title: Bō no Kanashimi), trans. Emi Shimokawa (Vertical, 2003)
- Winter Sleep (original title: Fuyu no Nemuri), trans. Mark Schilling (Vertical, 2005)
- The Cage (original title: Ori), trans. Paul Warham (Vertical, 2006)
- City of Refuge (original title: Nogare no Machi), trans. Y.T. Horgan (Vertical, 2012)

== Awards and nominations ==
- 1982 - Japan Adventure Fiction Association Prize: Nemuri Naki Yoru (Sleepless Night)
- 1983 - Yoshikawa Eiji Prize for New Writers: Nemuri Naki Yoru (Sleepless Night)
- 1983 - Japan Adventure Fiction Association Prize: The Cage
- 1984 - Nominee for Mystery Writers of Japan Award for Best Novel: The Cage
- 1985 - Mystery Writers of Japan Award for Best Novel: Kawaki no Machi (City of Thirst)
- 1991 - Shibata Renzaburo Prize: Hagun no Hoshi (Alkaid)
- 2004 - Yoshikawa Eiji Prize for Literature: Yōkashō (Generals of the Yang Family)
- 2006 - Shiba Ryotaro Prize: Suikoden (Water Margin)
- 2009 - Japan Mystery Literature Award for Lifetime Achievement

== Main works ==
=== Standalone hardboiled novels ===
- Chōshō Harukanari (弔鐘はるかなり), 1981
- Nogare no Machi (逃がれの街), 1982 (City of Refuge, Vertical, 2012)
- Kusari (鎖), 1983
- Manatsu no Sōretsu (真夏の葬列), 1983
- Au ni wa Tōsugiru (逢うには、遠すぎる), 1983
- Ori (檻), 1983 (The Cage, Vertical, 2006)
- Tomo yo, Shizuka ni Nemure (友よ、静かに瞑れ), 1984
- Kimi ni Ketsubetsu no Toki o (君に訣別の時を), 1984
- Kawaki no Machi (渇きの街), 1984
- Kako Rimembā (過去 リメンバー), 1984
- Are wa Maboroshi no Hata Datta no ka (あれは幻の旗だったのか), 1984
- Yagate Fuyu ga Owareba (やがて冬が終われば), 1984
- Yoru yori Tōi Yami (夜より遠い闇), 1984
- Asu Naki Machikado (明日なき街角), 1985
- Kuroi Doresu no Onna (黒いドレスの女), 1985
- Retsujitsu (烈日), 1985
- Futari dake no Kunshō (二人だけの勲章), 1985
- Sabi (錆), 1985
- Yoru yo Omae wa (夜よおまえは), 1985
- Warera ga Toki no Kagayaki (われらが時の輝き), 1986
- Furueru Tsume (ふるえる爪), 1986
- Tamashii no Kishibe (魂の岸辺), 1986
- Kiba (牙), 1986
- Fuyu koso Kemono wa Hashiru (冬こそ獣は走る), 1986
- Gyakkō no Onna (逆光の女), 1987
- Yoru no Owari (夜の終り), 1987
- Gusha no Machi (愚者の街), 1987
- Hyōteki (標的), 1987
- Itsuka Toki ga Nanji o (いつか時が汝を), 1988
- Kaenju (火焔樹), 1989
- Kizu Darake no Maseratti (傷だらけのマセラッティ), 1989
- Aki Hoteru (秋ホテル), 1990
- Bō no Kanashimi (棒の哀しみ), 1990 (Ashes, Vertical, 2003)
- Mizuiro no Inu (水色の犬), 1991
- Sabita Bui (錆びた浮標), 1992
- Omei no Hiroba (汚名の広場), 1993
- Yakusoku (約束), 1994
- Waga Sakebi Tōku (わが叫び遠く), 1994
- Soshite Kare ga Shinda (そして彼が死んだ), 1994
- Yukidomari (行きどまり), 1994
- Kare ga Ōkami datta Hi (彼が狼だった日), 1995
- Saikai (再会), 1995
- Fuyu no Nemuri (冬の眠り), 1996 (Winter Sleep, Vertical, 2005)
- Yoru o Machinagara (夜を待ちながら), 1999
- Hakujitsu (白日), 1999
- Gitai (擬態), 2001
- Baien (煤煙), 2003

=== Short story collections ===
- Kiro (帰路), 1988
- Itsuka Hikari wa Nioite (いつか光は匂いて), 1993
- Kōsu Agein [Course Again] (コースアゲイン), 2002

== See also ==
- Japanese detective fiction
