= Shibumi (novel) =

1979 novel by Trevanian

- First edition (publ. Outlet)
- Author: Trevanian
- Language: English
- Genre: Thriller
- Published: 1979
- Publisher: Outlet (Crown)
- Publication place: United States

Shibumi is a novel published in 1979, written in English by Trevanian, a pseudonym of Rodney William Whitaker.

== Plot summary ==
Shibumi is set in the 1970s and details the struggle between the "Mother Company", a conspiracy of energy and telecommunications companies that secretly controls much of the western world, and Nicholai Hel, a highly skilled, retired assassin. Hel is drawn back into the world of espionage to protect the sole survivor of a massacre orchestrated by the Mother Company. Bound by honor, Hel agrees to protect her, leading to a confrontation with the powerful organization.

== Plot details ==
Nicholai Hel is an assassin, born in Shanghai in 1925 and raised in a cosmopolitan fashion by his mother, a deposed member of the Russian aristocracy. A general in the Japanese Imperial Army was billeted in Nicholai's mother's mansion. Under this General Kishikawa, Hel is introduced to the concept of shibumi and the game Go, eventually being sent to Japan, where he trains under a famous master of the game and becomes 'culturally Japanese'. The master of this school discovers Nicholai's ability to mentally escape from reality and come back rested and refreshed (mystic transport). When Japan surrenders in 1945, Hel, after long months of hunger, finds (thanks to his knowledge of many languages) a job as an interpreter in the US Occupation Army and becomes a decoder agent in United States Intelligence.

Hel learns that Kishikawa is being held as a prisoner of war by the Russians and faces an ignominious show trial for war crimes. After visiting the General in captivity, he realises that he has provided the Russians a way to hurt the man he respects so much, having confirmed to the Soviet operative in charge of the prosecution the emotional attachment the General has to Hel.

Hel decides that the only way to show his gratitude and love for the man whom he has come to view as his father is to offer the general a way out of his captivity, one that avoids the public indignity of the public trial. Upon his next visit, Hel, speaking in veiled terms, offers to kill the general. After some resistance the general realises the sincerity of the offer and accepts.

Using his skills in the art of the "Naked/Kill", a martial discipline that trains in the use of ordinary items as instruments of death, Hel kills the general and is turned over to the American occupation force. Hel is then tortured by the Americans and held in solitary confinement without trial, Hel being a citizen of no country. In prison, his physical and mental discipline, along with studying the Basque language from some old books abandoned by a missionary, help him to retain his sanity, although, due to intense anger and hatred, he is no longer able to fully escape mentally and reach his state of peaceful ecstasy. He even develops, in his solitude, a "proximity sense" through which he is aware of any being drawing near (along with its amicable or hostile intentions), and which also allows him to find his way in complete darkness.

After three years, Hel is recruited out of his cell by the US Intelligence Service. It is in desperate need of an agent able to cause severe discord between Russia and China. It needs someone who has nothing to lose, who has European features, and who can speak fluent Chinese and Russian. Hel succeeds in his mission, taking for payment the names and locations of those who tortured him, and goes on to become one of the highest-paid and most skillful assassins in the world.

The novel begins with Hel who is retired in his late fifties in a small castle overlooking a village of the Haute-Soule, in the mountainous Northern Basque Country. He is an honorary member of the local Basque population, and his best friend among them is Beñat Le Cagot, a truculent Basque nationalist and bard, with whom he shares an immense love for freedom and an addiction to spelunking. Hel thinks he is now allowed to enjoy a life of cultivated shibumi (mingling discreet epicureanism with fatalism and detachment). He slowly improves his Japanese garden, enjoys restrictive gastronomy, and practices highly esoteric sex with his concubine.

Hel's shibumi existence is interrupted by the arrival of the niece of a man who saved Hel's life many years ago, herself the only survivor of a Jewish commando unit that took up arms to terminate the last of the Black September terrorists, the rest of the small unit having been gunned down in an Italian airport by CIA agents. She begs Hel to help her finish her mission and eliminate the terrorists, and gain revenge on the Mother Company.

== Use of Basque and Japanese ==
The main character Nicholai Hel speaks several languages due to his heritage and place of birth, and over the course of the book studies two additional languages: Japanese and Basque. These last two feature prominently in the book. Most of the Japanese in the book centers around the game of Go, which Hel formally studies, and which is used as a metaphor in several points throughout the book. The novel itself is broken down into six books, each of which is named from Japanese Go vocabulary. In the table of contents the author provides his own translation of these six terms, as follows:

- Fuseki: The opening stage of a game when the entire board is taken into account.
- Sabaki: An attempt to dispose of a troublesome situation in a quick and flexible way.
- Seki: A neutral situation in which neither side has the advantage. A "Mexican standoff".
- Uttegae: A sacrifice play, a gambit.
- Shichō: A running attack.
- Tsuru no Sugomori: "The confinement of the cranes to their nest," a graceful maneuver in which the enemy stones are captured.

All of these terms except "fuseki" also arise in the book itself, specifically during a conversation Hel has with his foster father General Kishikawa shortly before the General's death. Having their definitions in the table of contents aids the reader in understanding while Hel and the General are deliberately using these words metaphorically in order to prevent themselves from being understood by other characters. Other Go terms appear over the course of that conversation, some of which are defined for the reader's ease but others are not.

Some months after this conversation, Hel is in prison where he begins studying Basque as a way to keep his mind occupied. Much of the plot of the book will later take place in the Basque region of France, so Basque terminology and maxims feature heavily. Nearly all of the Basque words and phrases found in Shibumi can also be found word for word in Philippe Veyrin's 1949 French-language history of the Basque people, Les Basques de Labourd, de Soule et de Basse-Navarre: Leur histoire et leurs traditions and its 2011 English translation by Andrew Brown. Basque words often have several definitions and multiple accepted spellings, but those found in Shibumi always mirror those found in Veyrin.

== Prequel ==
Don Winslow published Satori in 2011, a novel based on Shibumi and set as a prequel. Out of respect for the original author Trevanian (Whitaker's pen name), Winslow sent the first 100 pages of the draft to Whitaker's daughter and executor for approval. The book explores Hel's early adulthood.

== Film adaptation ==
In August 2021, it was reported that a film adaptation of the novel was in development at Warner Bros. Pictures. The project will be produced by Chad Stahelski's 87Eleven Entertainment, with partners Alex Young and Jason Spitz joining him as producers. One year later, in August 2022, it was announced that Chad Stahelski would also direct the project with Matthew Orton being hired to write the screenplay.

== In popular culture ==
In the first John Wick film, the Security Guard at the small airfield where John tests his driving skills is reading a copy of Shibumi. In Bullet Train (2022), the Prince (played by Joey King) is reading Shibumi while traveling on the title train.
