= Strega (novel) =

1987 novel by Andrew Vachss

- First edition cover
- Author: Andrew Vachss
- Language: English
- Genre: Hardboiled detective novel
- Publisher: Alfred A. Knopf, New York, U.S.A.
- Publication date: 12 February 1987
- Publication place: United States
- Media type: Print (hardcover and mass market paperback)
- Pages: 293 pp
- ISBN: 0-394-55937-1
- Preceded by: Flood
- Followed by: Blue Belle

Strega (Italian for 'witch' / 'sorceress') is a hardboiled detective novel written by American author and attorney Andrew Vachss, first published in 1987. The story features the pursuit and destruction by the protagonist Burke, an ex-con private investigator, of a child sex ring involved in trading child pornography via telephone modems. The novel was written and published long before social concern over the use of the Internet for spreading or trading child pornography became widespread. The second novel in the Burke Series, it introduced numerous characters who would go on to appear in all of the series thereafter: Immaculata (Max's girlfriend and later mother to Flower); rescued child prostitute Terry (who would become Mole and Michelle's son); and Wolfe, who is serving as an Assistant District Attorney when the events in this story take place.

After the critical acclaim and commercial success of his first novel Flood, Vachss was contacted by Robert Gottlieb, then editor-in-chief of the New York publishing house Alfred A. Knopf, and signed a contract with an advance of US$175,000 for Strega. The novel subsequently won the 1988 Grand Prix de Littérature Policière, a French award for mystery and crime novels, and the 1989 Falcon Award by the Maltese Falcon Society of Japan.
