= Elizabeth Gordon (editor) =

American magazine editor (1906–2000)

Elizabeth Gordon (August 8, 1906 – September 3, 2000) was editor of House Beautiful magazine from 1941 to 1964. She was remembered as "a missionary of taste to the American homemaker".

== Career ==
In her well-known 1953 essay, "The Threat to the Next America", she criticized International Style modern architecture and associated it with totalitarianism and communism. For this she earned a personal letter of approval from Frank Lloyd Wright, and the two became friends.

In 1960, she introduced the Japanese aesthetic concept of shibui to an American audience. She spent five years researching the subject, including 16 months in Japan. The Shibui special issue (August 1960) "caused a sensation".

She edited The House Beautiful/AIA Climate Control Project, and wrote several articles on climate control for the magazine.

== Personal life and residence ==
She was married to Carl Norcross, "an authority on town planning." The couple's 1941 residence in Dobbs Ferry, New York, was designed by architect Julius Gregory.
