= Robert R. McCammon =

American writer

- Born: Robert Rick McCammon; July 17, 1952 (age 74)
- Education: University of Alabama (BA)
- Occupation: Novelist
- Spouse: Sally Sanders (m. 1981, div. 2011)
- Children: 1
- Parent(s): Jack McCammon; Barbara Bundy McCammon
- Writing career
- Genres: Horror fiction; Dark fantasy; Historical mystery; Post-apocalyptic
- Notable works: Swan Song (1987); Boy's Life (1991)
- Notable awards: Bram Stoker Award (1987); World Fantasy Award (1992)
- Website: www.robertmccammon.com

Robert Rick McCammon (born July 17, 1952) is an American novelist. Considered one of the influential authors in the late 1970s–early 1990s American horror literature boom, by 1991 McCammon had three New York Times bestsellers (The Wolf's Hour, Stinger, and Swan Song) and around 5 million books in print. He also wrote the critically acclaimed novel Boy's Life (1991) which won the World Fantasy Award for Best Novel in 1992. Since 2002, he's written ten books in a historical mystery series featuring an 18th-century magistrate's clerk, Matthew Corbett, as he unravels mysteries in colonial America.

== Early life ==
McCammon was born in Birmingham, Alabama. His parents are Jack, a musician, and Barbara Bundy McCammon. After his parents' divorce, McCammon lived with his grandparents in Birmingham. He received a B.A. in Journalism from the University of Alabama in 1974. McCammon lives in Birmingham.

== Career ==
McCammon has published multiple award-winning books, including Mine in 1990 and Boy's Life in 1991. After the release of Gone South, McCammon chose to leave his publisher. After clashing with an editor at a new publisher over the direction for his historical fiction novel Speaks the Nightbird, he retired from writing. After a long hiatus which resulted from the reorganization of the publishing industry and McCammon's personal depression and soul searching, he returned to the publishing world with Speaks the Nightbird, the first book in the Matthew Corbett series. Publishers Weekly called it a "compulsively readable yarn," and said, "McCammon's loyal fans will find his resurfacing reason to rejoice." Since 2002, seventeen new books have been published, including the ten books in the Matthew Corbett series.

In 1985, McCammon's story "Nightcrawlers" was adapted into an episode of The Twilight Zone.

After years out-of-print, Baal, Bethany's Sin, The Night Boat, and They Thirst were re-released by Subterranean Press as limited edition novels. In a 2013 interview, McCammon acknowledged that some readers would like to have a complete collection of his work, and said "reading back over those books I find they’re not as poorly written as I recall them to be."

== Personal life ==
He married Sally Sanders in 1981. They have a daughter named Skye. The couple divorced in 2011.

== Bibliography ==
=== Novels ===
- Baal (1978)
- Bethany's Sin (1980) – second published novel, but actually third written
- The Night Boat (1980) – third published novel, but actually second written
- They Thirst (1981)
- Mystery Walk (1983) – first novel published in hardcover
- Usher's Passing (1984)
- Swan Song (1987) - The first of his novels to appear on the New York Times Bestseller List
- Stinger (1988) – Nominated for the 1988 Bram Stoker Award for Best Novel; New York Times Bestseller
- Mine (1990)
- Boy's Life (1991)
- Gone South (1992) – Later published in an omnibus edition with Boy's Life.
- The Five (2011)
- The Border (2015)
- The Listener (2018)

=== Short story collections ===
- Blue World and Other Stories (1990) - Collection of thirteen stories, plus the title novella
- A Little Amber Book of Wicked Shots (2020)
- McCammon's Shoppe of Olde Curiosities - Stories (2026) - Collection of nineteen short stories, including the Bram Stoker Award–winning "Eat Me" and "The Deep End"

=== Edited ===
- Under the Fang (1991) (Anthology)
- Night Visions 8 (1990) (Anthology) - Includes his afterword and short story "The Judge"

=== Michael Gallatin books ===
- The Wolf's Hour (1989) – Nominated for the 1989 Bram Stoker Award for Best Novel; New York Times Bestseller
- The Hunter from the Woods (2011) (Short story collection)

=== Matthew Corbett series ===
- Speaks the Nightbird (2002) – Later published as two paperback volumes, Judgement of the Witch and Evil Unveiled
- The Queen of Bedlam (2007)
- Mister Slaughter (2010)
- The Providence Rider (2012)
- The River of Souls (2014)
- Freedom of the Mask (2016)
- Cardinal Black (April 2019)
- The King of Shadows (2022)
- Seven Shades of Evil (2023) (Short story collection)
- Leviathan (2024)

=== Trevor Lawson series ===
- I Travel by Night (2013)
- I Travel by Night 2: Last Train from Perdition (2016)

=== Appearance in anthologies ===
- "On a Beautiful Summer's Day, He Was" in The Further Adventures of The Joker (1990)

== Awards ==
Awards List for Robert McCammon
Work	Year & Award	Category	Result	Ref.
Usher's Passing	1985 Alabama Library Association Alabama Author Award	Fiction	Won	
Nightcrawlers	1985 World Fantasy Award	Short Fiction	Nominated	
Swan Song	1987 Bram Stoker Award	Novel	Won	
Swan Song	1988 World Fantasy Award	Novel	Nominated	
Swan Song	1988 Locus Award	Fantasy Novel	Nominated	
Swan Song	1994 Japan Adventure Fiction Association Prize		Won	
The Deep End	1987 Bram Stoker Award	Short Fiction	Won	
The Deep End	2014 FantLab's Book of the Year Award	Online Publication in Small Form	Won	
Best Friends	1988 World Fantasy Award	Novella	Nominated	
Stinger	1988 Bram Stoker Award	Novel	Nominated	
Stinger	1989 Locus Award	Horror Novel	Nominated	
Eat Me	1989 Bram Stoker Award	Short Fiction	Won	
The Wolf's Hour	1989 Bram Stoker Award	Novel	Nominated	
The Wolf's Hour	1990 Locus Award	Horror Novel	Nominated	
The Wolf's Hour	1992 Grand Prix de l'Imaginaire	Foreign Novel	Won	
Blue World and Other Stories	1989 Bram Stoker Award	Fiction Collection	Nominated	
Blue World and Other Stories	1990 World Fantasy Award	Collection	Nominated	
Blue World and Other Stories	1990 Locus Award	Collection	Nominated	
Mine	1990 Bram Stoker Award	Novel	Won	
Boy's Life	1991 Bram Stoker Award	Novel	Won	
Boy's Life	1992 World Fantasy Award	Novel	Won	
Boy's Life	1992 Locus Award	Horror/Dark Fantasy Novel	Nominated	
Boy's Life	1994 Grand Prix de l'Imaginaire	Foreign Novel	Nominated	
Boy's Life	1995 Japan Adventure Fiction Association Prize		Won	
Speaks the Nightbird	2003 Independent Publisher Book Awards	Historical/Military Fiction	Won	
Speaks the Nightbird	2004 Alabama Library Association Alabama Author Award	Fiction	Won	
Speaks the Nightbird	2013 Audie Awards	Fiction	Nominated	
The Border	2015 Goodreads Choice Awards	Horror	Nominated	
Cardinal Black	2019 Dragon Awards	Horror	Nominated	
The Listener	2019 Locus Award	Horror Novel	Nominated	
	2008 World Horror Convention Grand Master Award		Won	
	2009 Phoenix Award		Won	
	2013 Bram Stoker Award	Lifetime Achievement	Won	
