= Don Winslow =

American author (born 1953)

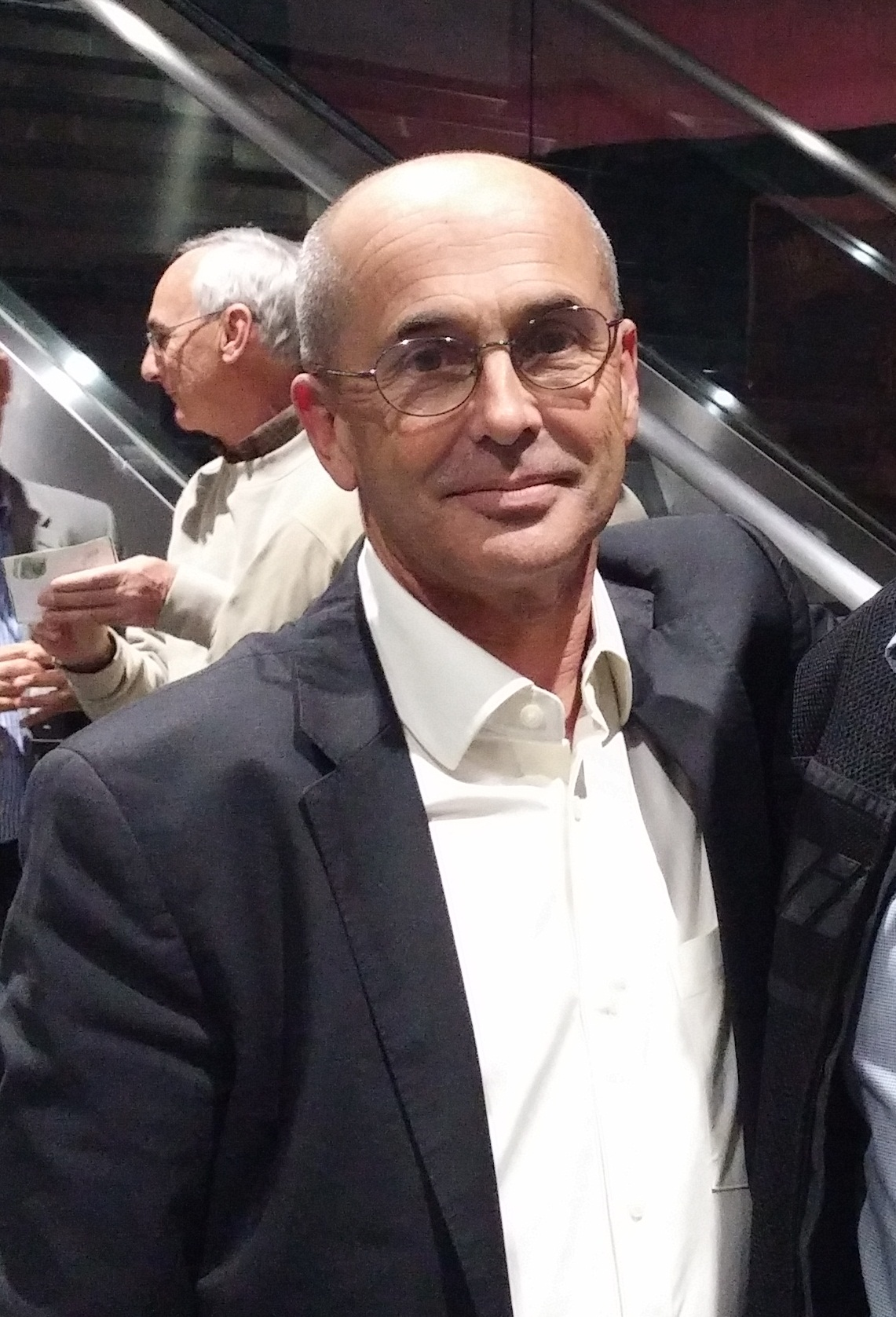
- Winslow in 2015
- Born: October 31, 1953 (age 73); New York City, U.S.
- Education: University of Nebraska–Lincoln
- Occupations: Novelist; screenwriter; political activist
- Spouse: Jean Winslow (m. 1985)
- Children: 1
- Writing career
- Period: 1991–present
- Genres: Crime fiction, mystery fiction, historical fiction
- Notable works: Neal Carey Mysteries, The Cartel Series
- Website: donwinslow.com

Don Winslow (born October 31, 1953) is an American author best known for his crime novels including Savages, The Force and the Cartel Trilogy.

== Early life ==
Winslow was born on Staten Island. He grew up in Perryville, a beach town near the village of Matunuck, Rhode Island. He credits his parents for preparing him to become a writer: his mother was a librarian and his father was a non-commissioned officer in the United States Navy who told stories and invited Navy friends around who told more. They inspired Winslow to become a storyteller himself. He majored in African history at the University of Nebraska–Lincoln. Winslow later earned a master's degree in military history.

== Career ==
=== Early career ===
After earning his master's degree, Winslow worked as an analyst for the Department of State in South Africa in the 1980s, before working as a safari guide in Kenya. Winslow returned to the U.S. in the late 1980s to work as a private investigator.

=== Writing ===
While traveling between Asia, Africa, Europe and North America, Winslow wrote his first novel, A Cool Breeze on the Underground, which was nominated for an Edgar Award and a Shamus Award for Best First Novel.

Winslow's second book, The Trail to Buddha's Mirror, continued the Neal Carey saga. He followed that up with three more Neal Carey novels, Way Down on the High Lonely, for which he was a Dilys Award finalist, A Long Walk Up the Water Slide, and While Drowning in the Desert.

For his next novel, Winslow broke from the Neal Carey character to write the standalone Isle of Joy, about an ex-CIA agent who is pulled back into the world of espionage, this time as the target of his former agency and the FBI.

A film and publishing deal for his novel The Death and Life of Bobby Z, also a Barry Award finalist, for Best Novel, allowed Winslow to become a full-time writer and settle in California, the setting for many of his books.

Winslow co-created the NBC television series UC/Undercover with his friend and agent Shane Salerno. The series ran one season and aired 13 episodes.

Winslow then published the Shamus Award finalist California Fire and Life, and Looking for a Hero.

In 2005, Winslow published what would become the first book in his epic "Cartel Trilogy," The Power of the Dog, about obsessive DEA Agent Art Keller's quest to take down an El Chapo-esque Sinaloan cartel. The book earned rave reviews around the world and was a finalist for the Barry, Macavity, Hammett, and Dilys awards.

Winslow then wrote The Winter of Frankie Machine, which garnered interest all over Hollywood and was eventually bought by Paramount Pictures for Robert De Niro to star in and Martin Scorsese to direct. During the development phase, screenwriter Eric Roth gave De Niro a book to read as research for the role. De Niro became so enthralled with that book – I Heard You Paint Houses – that he and Scorsese ended up adapting it into The Irishman. Winslow took it all in stride, even penning a humorous article on Deadline Hollywood jokingly titled “I Blame Eric Roth.”

Winslow followed Frankie Machine with the first of his two Boone Daniels books, Dawn Patrol. Winslow was yet again a finalist for the Barry and Dilys Awards.

In 2010, Winslow published Savages, which was voted a top-10 book of the year by The New York Times, Los Angeles Times, Entertainment Weekly, The Chicago Sun Times, and author Stephen King, and was a Barry, Dilys, and Steel Dagger Award finalist. The rights were quickly scooped up by award-winning filmmaker Oliver Stone. Winslow and Shane Salerno adapted the screenplay, and the film went on to star Aaron Taylor-Johnson, Taylor Kitsch, Blake Lively, Benicio del Toro, Salma Hayek, and John Travolta.

After Savages, Winslow returned to the world of ultra-California cool cop-turned-PI Boone Daniels in The Gentlemen's Hour. The book was a 2010 finalist for the Gold Dagger Award.

In 2011, Winslow wrote another standalone, Satori, a prequel to Trevanian's 1979 novel Shibumi. Winslow again earned rave reviews from critics and colleagues alike. Satori was purchased by Warner Brothers and Leonardo DiCaprio's Appian Way for DiCaprio to produce and star.

The following year, Winslow returned to the world of Savages, writing the prequel The Kings of Cool. Yet again, his book was a Gold Dagger finalist for Best Crime Novel of the Year.

2012 also saw Winslow given the Raymond Chandler Award, Italy's top lifetime achievement honor for masters of the thriller and noir literary genre. Past recipients have included Stephen King, John Le Carré, John Grisham, and Elmore Leonard.

In 2015, Winslow published the second book in his Cartel Trilogy, The Cartel. The book was an international success, earning starred reviews from Publishers Weekly, Booklist, and Library Journal, landing on Best Books of the Year lists for over sixty publications, including The New York Times, The Washington Post, The Seattle Times, Publishers Weekly, The Guardian, The Sunday Times, Daily Mail, and many others. Fellow novelists Stephen King, Michael Connelly, James Ellroy, and Harlan Coben also raved about The Cartel, naming it one of Winslow's best. The book went on to win the Ian Fleming Steel Dagger Award, the RBA Prize for Crime Writing, and Los Angeles Times Book Prize.

For his follow up to The Cartel, Winslow wrote another standalone, The Force, tackling corruption in the deepest recesses of the NYPD. The Force was named one of the Best Books of the Year by The New York Times, NPR, Barnes & Noble, Publishers Weekly, The Financial Times, The Daily Mail, Booklist, and LitHub. In a seven-figure deal, Fox purchased the film rights for James Mangold to direct Matt Damon in a script adapted by award-winning screenwriter Scott Frank.

In 2019, Winslow published the third and final installment of his Cartel Trilogy, The Border. It was named one of the Best Books of the Year by The Washington Post, NPR, The Guardian, The Financial Times, The New York Post, The Dallas Morning News, The Irish Times, Booklist, and many others. The film rights to the trilogy had originally been purchased by 20th Century Fox but in 2019, due to the sprawling nature of the story and world therein, FX Networks acquired the rights from their sister studio to turn the novels into a TV series. Filming on the pilot is set to begin in late-2022.

After concluding his Cartel Trilogy, Winslow published Broken, a collection of six short novellas all centered around the themes of crime, corruption, vengeance, justice, loss, and betrayal. Broken also earned starred reviews from Publishers Weekly and Kirkus Reviews.

Winslow's next novel, City on Fire, is the first book in a planned trilogy about the feuding Moretti and Murphy crime families in Providence, Rhode Island, in the 1980s and 1990s. The novel received critical acclaim and its screen rights were acquired by Sony to be adapted into a television series.

In addition to his novels, Winslow has published numerous short stories in anthologies and magazines such as Esquire, the Los Angeles Times Magazine and Playboy. His columns have appeared in the Vanity Fair, Vulture, Huffington Post, CNN Online, and other outlets.

In April 2022, Winslow announced his retirement from writing, to focus on his political video-making and activism. His City on Fire sequels are his final books. In 2023, he started a book club on Twitter.

In January, 2026, Winslow returned to writing. His book The Final Score features six crime novellas.

== Political views and activism ==
Winslow has spoken in favor of gun control, drug legalisation and reducing incarceration rates for non-violent crimes. In 2016, Winslow wrote an op-ed for Esquire arguing that the legalisation of marijuana exacerbated the war on drugs and cartel violence. In 2017, he criticized the border wall then-proposed by Donald Trump, saying, "You can build the biggest, best, most beautiful wall – it doesn't matter if the gates are open, and the gates are open 24/7."

During the 2020 presidential election, Winslow became politically active online, using his own money to champion liberal causes and criticize Donald Trump and his agenda. Winslow and Shane Salerno began creating political videos critical of the Trump administration for social media. On October 13, 2020, Don Winslow Films released a video critical of Trump prior to his campaign event in Pennsylvania. The video features Bruce Springsteen's song "Streets of Philadelphia" and has been viewed almost 10 million times. As of January 4, 2021, Winslow's videos had garnered over 135 million views. As of April 2022, the total view count was over 250 million.

A libel lawsuit was filed against Winslow on the basis of comments Winslow made in 2020 about an Irwin County Detention Center contractor, who Winslow had claimed performed illegal hysterectomies purportedly done at the direction of Donald Trump. In 2022 a district court ruled that the libel claims could go forward.

In April 2023, Winslow told The New Zealand Herald that he had no interest in entering politics.

== Writing process ==
Winslow said he writes from 5:30 a.m. to 10 a.m. and then hikes six or seven miles before returning to work. He typically works on two books at a time, moving to the other when work on the first stalls. He said the longest he has gone without writing after a book is completed was five days. He has described writing as "an addiction".

The time it takes him to write a book varies. The Death and Life of Bobby Z was written on the train between Dana Point, California and Los Angeles, one chapter per trip. The Power of the Dog took six years to research and write, including a trip to Mexico to interview people with similar experiences as the book's characters.

== Personal life ==
Winslow's career as an investigator often took him to California to look into arson cases, as his storytelling skills helped explain cases to juries. In the mid-1990s, he moved to California with his wife, Jean, and their infant son, Thomas, and continued writing. They currently split their time between Julian, California, and Rhode Island.

Winslow is an avid bird watcher.

== Works ==
=== Neal Carey series ===
- A Cool Breeze on the Underground (1991)
- The Trail to Buddha's Mirror (1992)
- Way Down on the High Lonely (1993)
- A Long Walk Up the Water Slide (1994)
- While Drowning in the Desert (1996)

=== The Cartel series ===
- The Power of the Dog (2005)
- The Cartel (2015)
- The Border (2019)

=== Boone Daniels series ===
- The Dawn Patrol (2008)
- The Gentlemen's Hour (2009)

=== Savages series ===
- Savages (2010)
- The Kings of Cool (2012) (prequel to Savages)

=== Frank Decker series ===
- 2014: Missing. New York (2014; not published in English)
- 2016: Germany (2016; not published in English)

=== Danny Ryan series ===
- City on Fire (2022)
- City of Dreams (2023)
- City in Ruins (2024)

=== Standalone novels ===
- Isle of Joy (A Winter Spy under the pseudonym MacDonald Lloyd) (1996)
- The Death and Life of Bobby Z (1997)
- California Fire and Life (1999)
- The Winter of Frankie Machine (2006)
- Satori (2011)
- Vengeance (2014; not published in English)
- The Force (2017)

=== Collections ===
- 2020: Broken
- 2026: The Final Score

=== Non-fiction ===
- 2004: Looking for a Hero (with Peter Maslowski), ISBN 978-0-8032-3244-0

=== Film, television, scripts, screenplays and video games ===
- UC: Undercover (TV series, co-creator)
- Full Ride (film, co-writer)
- Close to Home (2 episodes, writer)
- Savages (co-writer, based on his novel)
- Alexander Hamilton: In Worlds Unknown (script and film; New York Historical Society)
- Tom Clancy's Ghost Recon Wildlands

== Adaptations ==
- The Death and Life of Bobby Z (2007)
- Savages (2012, co-written by Winslow)
- Crime 101 (2026)

Upcoming adaptations

- The Force
- The Border
- City on Fire
- A Cool Breeze on the Underground

== Awards ==
Winslow won the 2012 Raymond Chandler Award at the Courmayeur Noir Festival. Previous winners include John le Carré, John Grisham and Michael Connelly.

Awards by book:

A Cool Breeze on the Underground

- 1992 Finalist for Edgar Best First
- 1992 Finalist for Shamus Best First
- 1994 Maltese Falcon Award, Japan

Way Down on the High Lonely

- 1994 Finalist Dilys Award

The Death and Life of Bobby Z

- 1998 Finalist Barry for Best Novel
- 1998 Finalist Lefty Award

California Fire and Life

- 2000 Shamus for Best Novel
- 2000 Finalist Dilys Award

The Power of the Dog

- 2005 Finalist Hammett Prize
- 2006 Finalist Barry for Best Novel
- 2006 Finalist Dilys Award
- 2006 Finalist Macavity Award for Best Novel
- 2009 Japan Adventure Fiction Association Prize
- 2010 Maltese Falcon Award, Japan

The Winter of Frankie Machine

- 2010 Japan Adventure Fiction Association Prize
- 2011 Maltese Falcon Award, Japan

The Dawn Patrol

- 2009 Finalist Barry for Best Novel
- 2009 Finalist Dilys Award

The Gentlemen's Hour

- 2010 Finalist Gold Dagger (Duncan Lawrie Dagger)

Savages

- 2010 Finalist Dilys Award
- 2011 Finalist Barry for Best Novel
- 2011 Finalist Steel Dagger

The Kings of Cool

- 2013 Finalist Gold Dagger (Duncan Lawrie Dagger)

The Cartel

- 2015 RBA Prize for Crime Writing (Spain), the world's most lucrative crime fiction prize at €125,000.
- 2016 Ian Fleming Steel Dagger given by CWA
