= Mystery Walk (novel) =

1983 novel by Robert R. McCammon

- First edition
- Author: Robert R. McCammon
- Cover artist: Nenad Jakesevic and Sonja Lamut
- Language: English
- Genre: Horror
- Publisher: Holt, Rinehart, & Winston
- Publication date: 1983
- Publication place: United States
- Media type: Print (paperback, hardback), e-book
- Pages: 419
- ISBN: 7671400599

Mystery Walk is a 1983 horror novel by American writer Robert McCammon. It was first published on May 13, 1983 through Holt, Rinehart & Winston and follows Billy Creekmore, a young boy capable of seeing and exorcising spirits.

== Plot ==
The Mystery Walk, the voyage through life to determine your place and purpose, is something we all undertake. For Billy Creekmore, it is something more for he is gifted with the power to help distressed souls pass into the afterlife. He must learn how to use his gift.

Billy learns early in life that he is something special. A fire rips through the home of one of his friends when he is a young kid. He learns that his friend and his whole family were murdered by the father. Billy is drawn to the home to discover his friend's body, secretly hidden under a coal pile in the basement. His friend's soul begs him to let people know where he is.

Billy lives in rural Hawthorne, Alabama with his devoutly Christian father and a mother who is a Choctaw Indian. His mother and grandmother before him are gifted with this power and have found ways to use it. His father hates it and hates that his son has it. But, he loves his wife and son the best he can.

Billy will not be without adversaries on his Mystery Walk. There is Little Wayne Falconer, the son and heir apparent to the south's most popular tent evangelist who hates the Creekmore's and the powers he regards as evil. There is also a serpent-like apparition that haunts Billy and inspires others to evil – including the father of his friend who murdered his family.

Wayne Falconer has his own Mystery Walk to undertake. He is the same age as Billy and his father has brought him into his ministry. As a young child, Wayne brought back from death his beloved dog by laying hands on him. Convinced that his son has the healing gift, JJ Falconer takes Wayne on the road to heal the faithful.

But Wayne has his doubts. One evening the Falconer Crusade stops in Hawthorne and the Creekmore family attends. Billy and his mother see Little Wayne Falconer healing the sick. Billy and his mother notice the black clouds that portend death hover over the sick who approach Falconer and do not dissipate when Wayne “heals” them. Billy's mother stands up and protests and the Creekmore family is thrown out of the revival. This is when the Creekmore family shows up on JJ Falconer's radar and his need to destroy them develops.

The story then follows Billy and Wayne through their lives into their teens. Billy is called upon by the owner of a local saw mill to dispel the spirit of a man who died horribly in an accident with a saw. He does the task. But instead of earning the appreciation of the owner and community, Billy earns scorn and derision from the local Christians. Meanwhile, Wayne finds himself increasingly the star attraction of his father's growing ministry.

Both desire something resembling a normal life and both make a single effort that shows how that will be impossible. Billy attends a high school dance at his local school where he is shunned. At a bonfire, someone has stuffed hundreds of fireworks in the stack of wood. It explodes and some kids are killed; others are badly injured. Billy, who is injured goes to the hospital where he and his family are shunned. The Falconers show up and are greeted with pleas from the parents to have Wayne heal their injured children. Ramona Creekmore intervenes and asks Wayne, “Son, do you even know what you’re doing?” The Creekmores are run out of the hospital.

Wayne attends a party one evening where teenagers are drinking and partying. He meets a girl who is obviously desperate to have sex with him. Wayne battles between his natural lust and his acquired faith with his faith ultimately winning. When he spurns the girl, she gets upset and mocks him. He picks up a stick and strikes her in the head. She falls into the water and disappears.

One evening, shortly after the fireworks incident, things come to a head in Hawthorne for the Creekmores. The Ku Klux Klan – of whom Billy's father is a member – shows up and tells John Creekmore that he is still welcome to stay in Hawthorne, but his wife and son would have to leave. A fight ensues and several Klansmen and Billy's father are injured. The Klan flees.

But things will never be the same for the Creekmore family. John Creekmore has suffered brain injury and is mentally reduced. Income on their farm has all but ceased. Opportunity presents itself in the form of a carnival operator who offers Billy a job in his “Death Show.” He will pay Billy well and Billy will be able to send money home from the road.

Wayne's life is also dramatically changed when his father suffers a heart attack and dies. Wayne, still in his teens, is now the head of a multimillion-dollar television and multi-media evangelical operation. Unable to cope, he tries to heal his father's death at the funeral home unsuccessfully. Later, he is visited by his father's spirit (actually the serpent shape changer of Billy's nightmares) who encourages Wayne to take calmative drugs and to take the advice of the men who helped JJ.

While out with the carnival, Billy encounters the shape shifter who has taken the shape of a dilapidated carnival ride that has injured many. A couple carnival workers are drawn irresistibly to this ride. One of them is the carnival's snake handler who lusts for the women with whom Billy has fallen in love with. He tries to kill Billy's girlfriend with a poisonous snake and is nearly successful. Billy finds the man and shoots him. He then finds the man who owns the mysterious ride and challenges him to a ride. Billy gets on and finds the souls of those injured and killed while riding it, setting them free, defeating the shape changer who leaves.

Billy returns home after his father dies. His mother encourages him to visit an institute in Chicago that investigates paranormal activity. Billy travels to Chicago and moves into the institute. After intensive study, the institute's head says she believes Billy has powers, but that she cannot document them and therefore Billy is of no use to her. He must leave.

As Billy is preparing to leave, there is a horrible fire at a Chicago flop house that kills several residents. He travels to the worst part of Chicago's south side to the hotel and invites the terrified souls still trapped in the hotel to come into him and set themselves free. As the ghosts rush at Billy, there is a television news crew nearby to capture the whole event on camera.

Meanwhile, Wayne has attracted the attention of a west coast gangster who is a major germaphobe and an organized crime head. The man is eager to gain control of one of the ministry's record studios as well as gaining control of Wayne's healing powers to help with hypochondriac tendencies. Wayne's father comes to him in his sleep and tells him he must trust help from these people who will help Wayne build a new ministry in California and Mexico.

Wayne becomes quite comfortable living in the California mansion. Meanwhile, his associates are worried about the fate of the ministry that is suffering from inattention. One of Wayne's associates leaves in disgust. The other is subjected to a test where his throat is cut and Wayne is forced to use his power to save him.

The mobster, now convinced that Wayne can keep him safe from disease and injury, asks Wayne what it is he wants in exchange. Wayne says he wants the Creekmore woman and her son dead. Romona, now old and living alone, is taken out easily. But one day, one of JJ's old associates brings to California with him Wayne's mother who tells him that Wayne was not really JJ's son. JJ was unable to sire a child of his own and purchased one from a man in Hawthorne. Wayne knows that Billy is that other boy.

Billy is kidnapped and taken to Mexico where he meets Wayne Falconer once again. While on a plane trip back from Mexico, the evil being takes over Wayne's body and forces the plane to crash. Wayne, Billy, and the evil gangster survive. The evil shapeshifter takes over the gangster's body and pursues them across the desert. They are able to escape it and the ultimate showdown between good, evil, and the misused finally convenes.
