= Savages (novel) =

2010 novel by Don Winslow

- First edition
- Author: Don Winslow
- Language: English
- Genre: Thriller, Crime novel
- Publisher: Simon & Schuster
- Publication date: 2010
- Publication place: United States
- Media type: Print
- Pages: 320
- ISBN: 9781439183373

Savages is a crime novel by American author Don Winslow, published in 2010. It was followed in 2012 by a prequel, The Kings of Cool.

== Plot summary ==
Ben and Chon are two Americans running a lucrative marijuana operation out of Laguna Beach, California. Their business thrives until members of the Mexican Baja Cartel decide they want to enter the same business. When Ben and Chon resist the Mexicans' demands, the cartel kidnaps "O" (short for Ophelia), the boys' close confidante and frequent bedroom playmate. Ben and Chon conjure schemes to outwit their adversaries and win back O, using everything from improvised explosive devices to masks.

== Film adaptation ==
In 2012, the novel was adapted into a film of the same name, directed by Oliver Stone and co-written by Winslow.
