= Matthew E. May =

American author

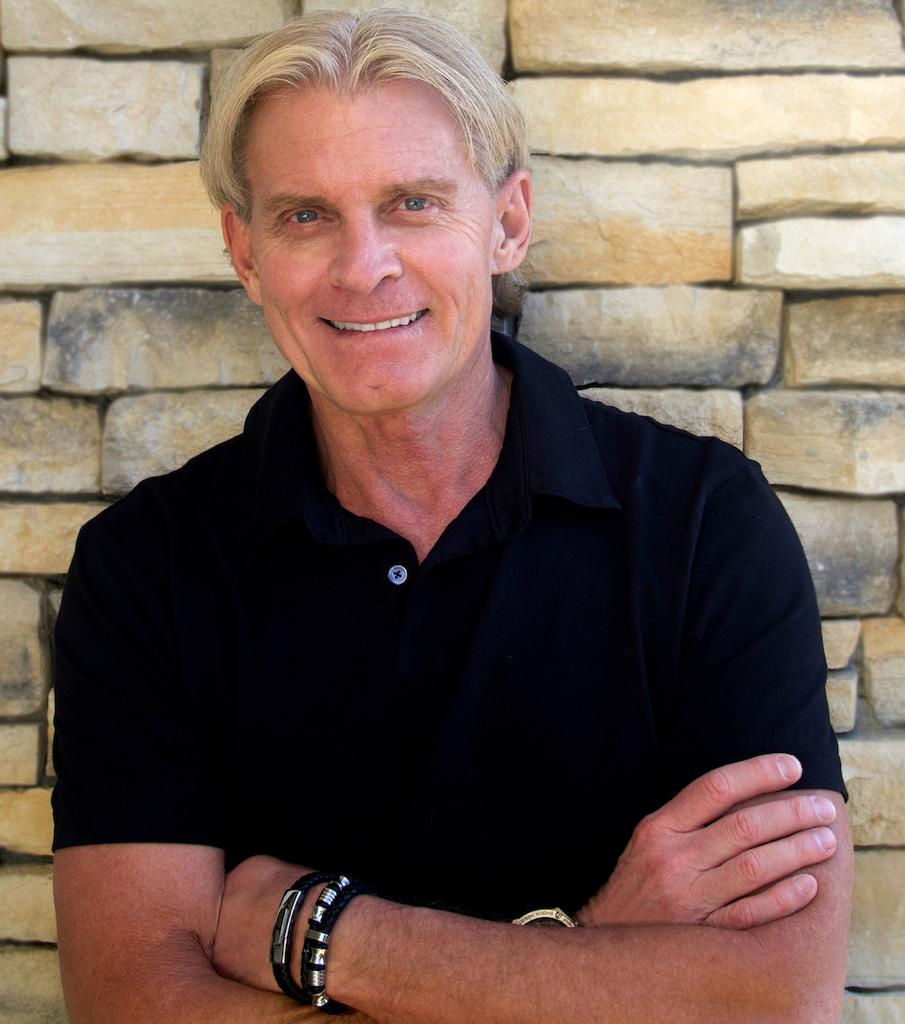
- Born: Baltimore, Maryland, United States
- Education: Johns Hopkins University, B.A; Wharton School of Business, M.B.A.
- Occupations: Author, business strategist
- Years active: 1985-present
- Website: matthewemay.com

Matthew E. May is an American author and business strategist. He is best known for his six books: The Elegant Solution, In Pursuit of Elegance, The Shibumi Strategy, The Laws of Subtraction, Winning the Brain Game, and What a Unicorn Knows: How Leading Entrepreneurs Use Lean Principles to Drive Sustainable Growth.

== Education ==
May graduated with a BA from Johns Hopkins University in 1981, and from the Wharton School of Business in 1985 with an MBA.

== Career ==
In his early post-graduate career May worked as an independent performance improvement consultant with leading training, development, and management consulting firms. In 1999, May was exclusively retained by Toyota to assist with the launch of their corporate university. The partnership lasted through 2006, after which May published his first of six books and began keynote speaking and advising senior executive teams. In 2020, he began working exclusively with Insight Partners, a leading venture capital and private equity firm. May advises on matters of strategy, innovation, customer experience, and lean operations.

== Bibliography ==
- The Elegant Solution - In 2007, May published the book The Elegant Solution: Toyota's Formula for Mastering Innovation. The book is based upon the lessons May learned as a consultant at University of Toyota, specifically as the company was making an effort to export the principles of its Toyota Production System to other areas of the company. From this experience, May has stated there are 3 principles (the art of ingenuity; the pursuit of perfection; and the rhythm of fit) and 10 practices that set Toyota apart from its competitors. Katherine Radeka reviewed the work, writing that, “Rather than copy Toyota’s activities, May seems to ask his readers to internalize the underlying thoughts and then to develop their own activities.”
- In Pursuit of Elegance - In 2009, May followed up his first book with the work In Pursuit of Elegance: Why the Best Ideas Have Something Missing. This work distills “elegance” as the chief goal and principle that should be sought in business operations. May further distills elegance down to the sub-principles of Symmetry, Seduction, Subtraction, and Sustainability. The book focuses on a business audience, seeking to address business solutions specifically with his principles. Oliver Ho reviewed the work, writing that in the book May had, “an interesting sense of synthesis and ability to find connections across various fields, from pop culture to fine arts, science to sports.”
- The Shibumi Strategy - In 2010, May published the book The Shibumi Strategy: A Powerful Way to Create Meaningful Change. In May’s book, writes of zen principles such as kanso and koko, and how they help Japanese business executives to arrive at simpler and more elegant solutions than many of their Western counterparts. The book advocates the implementation of Japanese aesthetics into Western life, and the seeking of an even-minded and peaceful response to work stress. The title of the book comes from an untranslatable Japanese concept shibui, referring to something approximately “the height of personal excellence and total clarity”. May separates the steps to approaching this strategy as: commitment, preparation, struggle, breakthrough and transformation.
- The Laws of Subtraction - In 2012, May published the book The Laws of Subtraction: 6 Simple Rules for Winning in the Age of Excess Everything. Max Nisen described the book as, “May and a series of business executives, creatives, and thought leaders” focusing on the “ability to simplify and remove complexity, rather than just adding more.” May’s six laws break down the concept into a methodology to be used in management or development environments. The book is an extension of the principle of Subtraction as found in his book In Pursuit of Elegance.
- Winning the Brain Game - In 2016, May published the book Winning the Brain Game: Fixing the 7 Fatal Flaws of Thinking. The book is based on May’s fieldwork over a 10-year period in which he gave over 100,000 business professionals a simple thought exercise, based on a real case far less complex that their routine business problems. Less than 5% arrived at the solution. May not only catalogues his observations into seven primary cognition patterns he calls “flaws," but also calls on modern neuropsychology to explain the brain functions causing the flaws. He then enlists the guidance of renowned thinkers to offer practical techniques to neutralize the flaws.
- What a Unicorn Knows - In 2023, May published the book What a Unicorn Knows: How Leading Entrepreneurs Use Lean Principles to Drive, co-authored with Pablo Dominguez. The book is based on over five years of successful corporate performance optimization by May and Dominguez achieved as operational advisors working with high-growth technology companies classified as a unicorn in the investment portfolio of Insight Partners, a New York City-headquartered private equity and venture capital firm. May and Dominguez offer a strategic operating model derived from, and consistent with, Toyota-based lean thinking. Five principles comprise the model: Strategic Speed, Constant Experimentation, Accelerated Value, Lean Process, and Esprit de Corps. The model is best remembered using the mnemonic acronym SCALE.

== Other work ==
May is a contributor to a number of newspapers, reviews, and magazines. He is a winner of the New Yorker Magazine Cartoon Caption Contest.
