= The Further Adventures of The Joker =

- Cover of The Further Adventures of The Joker (1990), art by Kyle Baker
- Editor: Martin H. Greenberg
- Cover artist: Kyle Baker
- Language: English
- Genre: Anthology, Superhero fiction
- Publisher: Bantam Books
- Publication date: 1990
- Publication place: United States
- Pages: 475 pg
- ISBN: 0-553-40246-3

The Further Adventures of The Joker (1990) is an English paperback anthology of short fiction stories about Batman's archenemy the Joker. The material was written by various authors (see below), and the book was edited by Martin H. Greenberg. It was the follow-up to an earlier Batman anthology, The Further Adventures of Batman, and was followed by two later installments: The Further Adventures of Batman vol. 2 Featuring the Penguin and The Further Adventures of Batman vol. 3 Featuring Catwoman.

The stories in The Further Adventures of The Joker cover a wide range of topics and styles, with the title character, and his complicated relationship with the Batman, as the unifying theme; from tales of the Joker's childhood, to his current crimes, some of which Batman attempts to foil.

All of the works included in this anthology are considered to be "non-canonical", in relation to mainstream DC Comics continuity. Joe R. Lansdale's story "Belly Laugh, or The Joker's Trick or Treat" is notably a sequel to Lansdale's story from The Further Adventures of Batman.

== Stories ==
Title	Author
"Belly Laugh, or The Joker's Trick or Treat"	Joe R. Lansdale
"Definitive Therapy"	F. Paul Wilson
"On a Beautiful Summer's Day, He Was"	Robert R. McCammon
"The Man Who Laughs"	Stuart M. Kaminsky
"Someone Like You"	Sheri S. Tepper
"Help! I Am a Prisoner"	Joey Cavalieri
"Bone"	Will Murray
"Dying Is Easy, Comedy Is Hard"	Edward Bryant and Dan Simmons
"Double Dribble"	George Alec Effinger
"The Joker's War"	Robert Sheckley
"The Joker Is Mild"	Edward D. Hoch
"Happy Birthday"	Mark L. Van Name and Jack McDevitt
"Masks"	Garfield Reeves-Stevens
"Best of All"	Marco Palmieri
"The Joker's Christmas"	Karen Haber
"On the Wire"	Andrew Helfer
"The Fifty-Third Card"	Henry Slesar
"Museum Piece"	Mike Resnick
"Balloons"	Edward Wellen
"Jangletown"	Elizabeth Hand and Paul Witcover

== See also ==
- Joker (character)
