= Don't! Buy! Thai! =

Campaign to boycott Thai goods

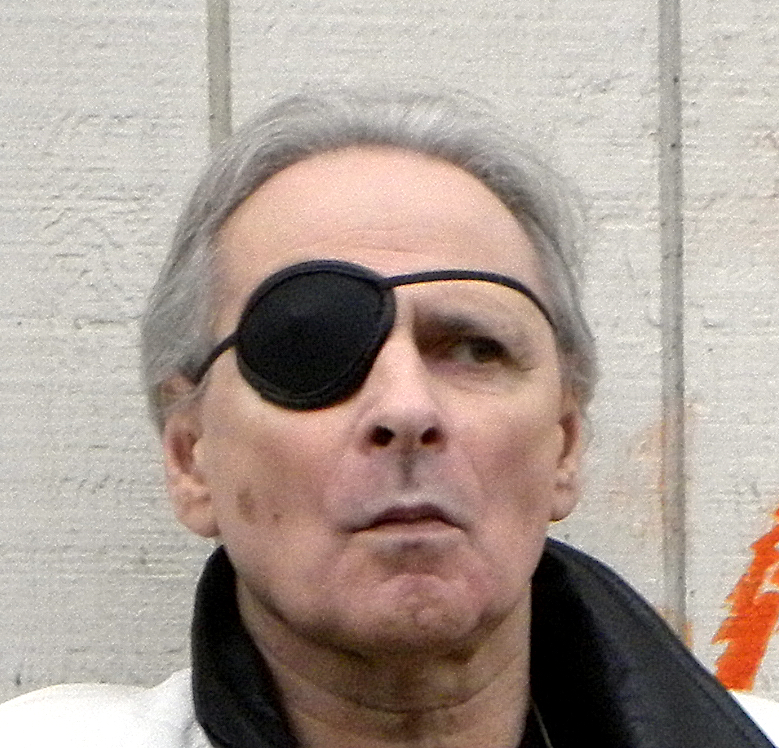
Vachss in 2011

Don't! Buy! Thai! was a campaign initiated in the early 1990s by American child welfare advocate and writer Andrew Vachss to boycott goods and services produced in Thailand until the Thai government introduced formal and practical reforms to significantly curtail the prostitution of children.

The organization of Don't! Buy! Thai! was willfully informal, with promoters refusing donations.

The campaign had great difficulty attracting attention from television, radio, and print media, so discussion was conducted largely on the Internet. Online, it came under vociferous attack by Sean Parlaman, who presented himself as a crusader against the prostitution of children. Parlaman variously accused the Don't! Buy! Thai! campaigners of being fundamentalist Christians, right-wing bigots, and pedophiles.

In 2000, frustrated by the lack of traction and noting that the prostitution of children to sex tourists had become less concentrated in Thailand, Vachss and most of those involved abandoned the boycott.

== See also ==
- Do not buy Russian goods!
- Boycott Chinese products
- Great American Boycott
