= Mark Schilling =

American film critic, journalist, translator, and author (born 1949)

- Born: 1949 (age 76–77); Zanesville, Ohio, U.S.
- Occupations: Film critic, journalist

Mark Schilling (born 1949) is an American film critic, journalist, translator, and author based in Tokyo, Japan. He has written for The Japan Times, Variety, and Screen International.

== Biography ==
Schilling began working for The Japan Times in 1989.

He has been an occasional commentator for NHK's English broadcasts of sumo tournaments since they began in 1992. He wrote Sumo: A Fan's Guide in 1994, and previously co-wrote Jesse: Sumo Superstar in 1985 about Takamiyama Daigorō. He has also reported on the sport for Variety.

Schilling's 1997 book, The Encyclopedia of Japanese Pop Culture, was described by D. James Romero of Los Angeles Times as "a history as well as a guidebook to one of the freshest influences in the American popular stream."

He was a script advisor for the 2003 Hollywood film The Last Samurai.

Schilling has also written books such as Contemporary Japanese Film, The Yakuza Movie Book: A Guide to Japanese Gangster Films, and No Borders, No Limits: Nikkatsu Action Cinema.

He curated the "No Borders, No Limits: 1960s Nikkatsu Action Cinema" series for Japan Society in 2007.

== Bibliography ==
=== Author ===
- Sumo: A Fan's Guide (1994)
- The Encyclopedia of Japanese Pop Culture (1997)
- Contemporary Japanese Film (2003)
- The Yakuza Movie Book: A Guide to Japanese Gangster Films (2003)
- No Borders, No Limits: Nikkatsu Action Cinema (2007)
- Art, Cult and Commerce: Japanese Cinema Since 2000 (2020)

=== Translator ===
- Princess Mononoke: The Art and Making of Japan's Most Popular Film of All Time (1999)
- Kenzo Kitakata's Winter Sleep (2004)
