= Nightcrawlers (The Twilight Zone) =

- The Twilight Zone segment
- Episode no.: Season 1 Episode 4c
- Directed by: William Friedkin
- Written by: Philip DeGuere
- Editing by: Jere Huggins
- Original air date: October 18, 1985

Guest appearances
- James Whitmore Jr. as (Trooper) Dennis Wells; Scott Paulin as Price; Robert Swan as Bob the cook; Exene Cervenka as Waitress; Bobby Bass as Ray; Sandy Martin as Lindy; Matt Levin as Ricky

Episode chronology
← Previous "Wish Bank"	Next → "If She Dies"

"Nightcrawlers" is the third and final segment of the fourth episode of the first season of the television series The Twilight Zone. It is adapted from a short story of the same name by Robert R. McCammon, first published in the 1984 collection Masques.

== Plot ==
State trooper Dennis Wells takes shelter from a downpour at a roadside diner. He describes to Bob the cook and the server a massacre that he is investigating that occurred at a local motel. After almost getting into a collision outside, a Vietnam veteran named Price enters the diner. Concerned by Price's reckless driving, Wells interrogates him.

Price, who takes stimulant pills while downing three cups of coffee, is goaded by Wells’ enthusiasm for the war to describe how he fled and abandoned his unit, leaving all of them dead in the jungle, and that he has a recurring nightmare in which his unit, "The Nightcrawlers", are hunting him down to exact revenge. Wells instructs Price to sleep the night off at a local motel, but Price says he can't stay at a motel because he becomes a danger to everyone around him when he sleeps. Price explains that he and four other soldiers were sprayed with a chemical that gave them the power of mind over matter, which he demonstrates by materializing a T-bone steak on the grill. He says such manifestations quickly fade while he is awake, but are persistent when he dreams. Wells, realizing Price caused the massacre he's investigating, tries to arrest him, but Price melts Wells’ gun with his mind. Enraged, Wells knocks Price unconscious with a ketchup bottle, unintentionally bringing Price's nightmare into the world. Helicopters and soldiers materialize, destroying everything in the cafe with machine gun fire and explosions. Trying to escape, Wells is shot and killed. Bob tries to kill Price with a frying pan, but is shot though not killed. Price regains consciousness as the soldiers force their way in. A spotlight is cast upon him, and he calls out, "Charlie's in the light!," prompting the soldiers to shoot and kill him. The assault force vanishes as Price dies. The cafe in flaming ruins, Bob is taken away in an ambulance. He reminds the others that Price said there are four more soldiers out there who have the same ability.

== Production ==
"Nightcrawlers" was based on a short story by Robert R. McCammon. Executive producer Philip DeGuere wrote the teleplay, which he said was fairly easy, since the short story was so visual. It was scored by Merl Saunders and the Grateful Dead, featuring Huey Lewis on harmonica. Exene Cervenka of the punk group X plays a waitress.

"Nightcrawlers" was one of the most expensive segments to film in the entire series, chiefly due to its pyrotechnic finale, since all of the explosions and destroyed vehicles were real and not miniatures. The exterior of the diner was filmed on location by the side of a real highway, while the interior was a set built on the CBS Radford lot. The interior lights were rigged so that they would flicker whenever there was supposed to be a lightning strike.

Cinematographer Bradford May said director William Friedkin was the most challenging director he had ever worked with because he demanded utmost intensity from every shot. Wanting more intensity from Scott Paulin, the actor who played Price, Friedkin put his face right up to Paulin's and shook him, to the shock of the cast and crew.

In retrospect, director William Friedkin said, "‘Nightcrawlers’ I did because it was a great story. It was a metaphor for how Vietnam continues to haunt us. We had a five-day shoot, and I approached it and shot it the same way I’d approach a film. It’s one of the most watched things I’ve ever done, and so it restored my confidence. But I’d always dabbled in TV, so this wasn’t an attempt to get away from film. To me it was no different from film, really."

== Bibliography ==
- Zicree, Marc Scott: The Twilight Zone Companion. Sillman-James Press, 1992 (second edition)
