= Savages (2012 film) =

Film by Oliver Stone

- Theatrical release poster
- Directed by: Oliver Stone
- Screenplay by: Shane Salerno; Oliver Stone; Don Winslow
- Based on: Savages by Don Winslow
- Produced by: Moritz Borman; Eric Copeloff
- Starring: Taylor Kitsch; Blake Lively; Aaron Johnson; John Travolta; Benicio del Toro; Salma Hayek
- Cinematography: Dan Mindel
- Edited by: Joe Hutshing; Stuart Levy; Alex Marquez
- Music by: Adam Peters
- Production companies: Relativity Media; Ixtlan Productions
- Distributed by: Universal Pictures
- Release dates: June 25, 2012 (Westwood); July 6, 2012 (United States)
- Running time: 130 minutes
- Country: United States
- Language: English
- Budget: $45 million
- Box office: $83 million

Savages is a 2012 American action thriller film directed by Oliver Stone. Its screenplay, written by Stone, Don Winslow and Shane Salerno, is based on Winslow's 2010 novel. It stars Taylor Kitsch, Blake Lively, Aaron Taylor-Johnson, Benicio del Toro, Demián Bichir, Salma Hayek, and John Travolta. The film follows two cannabis growers, Chon, an ex-Navy SEAL, and Ben, who are best friends, as they confront the Mexican drug cartel that kidnapped their girlfriend.

The film was released by Universal Pictures on July 6, 2012, to mixed reviews, and grossed $83 million worldwide on a $45 million budget.

== Plot ==
Best friends Chon and Ben are cannabis growers in Laguna Beach. Chon, a former Navy SEAL, smuggled the seeds for the plants out of Afghanistan. Ben, a University of California, Berkeley graduate in business and botany, cultivates cannabis. The seeds yield a particularly potent strain, which develops a wide customer base. Chon and Ben become wealthy, and Ben devotes time and money to charity work in Africa and Asia. They are both openly in a relationship with Ophelia Sage.

The trio receives a video from Mexican drug cartel enforcer Miguel "Lado" Arroyo of severed heads and a chainsaw, and Arroyo demands a meeting at which the cartel offers a partnership. Although Chon and Ben offer to hand over their network and get out of the business, the cartel wants their expertise and insists on a partnership. Chon and Ben plan with Ophelia to go to Indonesia for a year, not telling her they are fleeing the cartel. They speak to corrupt DEA agent Dennis Cain, who is on the take from them and who urges them to join the cartel. Ophelia is kidnapped by Lado's gang; Chon and Ben are notified of the kidnapping by a video call from cartel leader Elena Sánchez, who threatens to harm Ophelia if they decline the partnership.

They discuss the situation with Dennis, who tells them that Elena is facing the loss of her political connections in Mexico (foiling her efforts to move into the U.S.). Since she has already lost most of her family, Dennis says that he has nothing on her that can help them. Chon stabs Dennis in the hand and demands DEA intelligence so they can attack Elena. With help from Chon's Navy SEAL friends, he and Ben attack a cartel money convoy and kill seven of Elena's men.

Ophelia, held in horrible conditions, demands to speak to whoever is in charge. Lado drugs and rapes her in retaliation for going over his head. Elena, traveling to the U.S. to visit her daughter and deal with the escalating situation, has Ophelia brought with her. Chon and Ben frame high-ranking cartel member Alex as an agent of Elena's rival, El Azul. With Dennis' help, they falsify evidence and give it to Lado. Lado tortures Alex to force a confession. After Alex confesses, Lado covers him with petrol and forces Ben to ignite the petrol; Ophelia is forced to watch. Lado double-crosses Elena and begins working with El Azul.

Ben and Chon pay Dennis $3 million for information about Elena's daughter, Magda, and the name of his informant in Elena's cartel. They kidnap Magda and video-call Elena to establish that they are now in control. With Elena at their mercy, they arrange a desert meeting to exchange Ophelia and Magda at which snipers from both sides are in position.

Then an imagined scene follows: Elena asks who revealed her daughter's location, and Chon tells her it was Lado. She tries to kill Lado, but he shoots her first. A firefight erupts, and Chon is shot several times. Lado is shot in the back by Ben but shoots him in the neck before Ophelia kills him. Ben is mortally wounded, and Chon injects him, Ophelia, and himself with a fatal overdose so they can die together.

The movie snaps back to reality. At the meeting, Lado steals Elena's car and escapes as Dennis leads DEA agents with a helicopter to the scene. Everyone but Lado and Magda are arrested. Because Ben has incriminating information about Dennis, Dennis identifies Ben and Chon as his informants in the cartel, and they are released. Elena is sentenced to thirty years in prison, and El Azul and Lado create a new cartel called the Azulados. Ben, Chon, and Ophelia leave the country and live in a beachside hut, possibly in Indonesia. Ophelia tells us that they are living like savages.

== Cast ==
- Taylor Kitsch as John "Chon" McAllister Jr.
- Blake Lively as Ophelia "O" Sage
- Aaron Taylor-Johnson as Ben Leonard
- Benicio del Toro as Miguel "Lado" Arroyo
- Salma Hayek as Elena "La Reina" Sánchez
- John Travolta as DEA Agent Dennis Cain
- Demián Bichir as Alex Reyes
- Sandra Echeverría as Magdalena Sánchez
- Emile Hirsch as "Spin"
- Joaquín Cosío as "El Azul"
- Mía Maestro as Dolores Arroyo
- Shea Whigham as Chad
- Joel David Moore as Craig
- Amber Dixon as Sophía
- Diego Cataño as Estéban
- Leonard Roberts as Frankie
- Trevor Donovan as Matt
- Ralph Echemendia as Wiley
- Jake McLaughlin as "Doc"
- Alexander Wraith as Sam
- Antonio Jaramillo as Jaime
- Leana Chavez as Gloria
- Elena Varela as Maria
- Lexi Jourden as Hannah
- Sean Stone as Eric
- Ali Wong as Claire

== Production ==
We had two weeks rehearsal, so we talked about it until we were about to pass out. I think I had known Blake for three or four days, before we shot [those scenes]. That was the first week of shooting. It was just about trusting Blake and Oliver, as you do on any set. I was just glad it was over with, to be honest. It's very awkward to do. It's such a big part of Chon and who he is. That's how you meet him, so it's a pretty intense reveal, no pun intended. It's all part of it, but I was glad it was in the first week.

— Kitsch on shooting the sex scenes

By August 2011, the film was shooting in the Pacific Palisades neighborhood of Los Angeles. The Los Angeles Times reported: "The estate's indoor pool was converted into a massive hydroponic cannabis farm for the film's production, with about 300 high-octane pot plants jamming the covert nursery." Production designer Tomas Voth said: "I wanted to use real plants and had them all ready to go, but it was some legal thing. Universal told us to use fakes." The sex scenes were filmed during the first three days. The film entered post-production in October 2011. Stone personally categorized it as a romantic action thriller.

=== Casting ===
Jennifer Lawrence was originally cast as Ophelia but dropped out due to scheduling conflicts. Other actresses considered to replace Lawrence included Amber Heard, Olivia Wilde, Lindsay Lohan, Teresa Palmer, and Abbie Cornish. In April 2011, it was reported that Blake Lively had been cast as Ophelia. Before casting Taylor Kitsch in the film, Oliver Stone asked director Peter Berg to show him 30 minutes of Kitsch's work in Battleship to see how he was as a leading man, and after seeing that footage, he cast him. Trevor Donovan originally auditioned for a role that was cut but after seeing Donovan's tape, Stone specifically wrote him a part that was not in the book. Uma Thurman played Ophelia's mother, Paqu, but her scenes were cut due to time constraints.

== Release ==
The film was released on July 6, 2012. On its opening weekend, the film ranked fourth at the box office, earning $16.2 million. As of April 3, 2013, it has grossed $47,382,068 in North America and $35,584,084 in other countries, for a worldwide total of $82,966,152.

=== Home media ===
Savages was released on DVD and Blu-ray on November 13, 2012.

== Reception ==
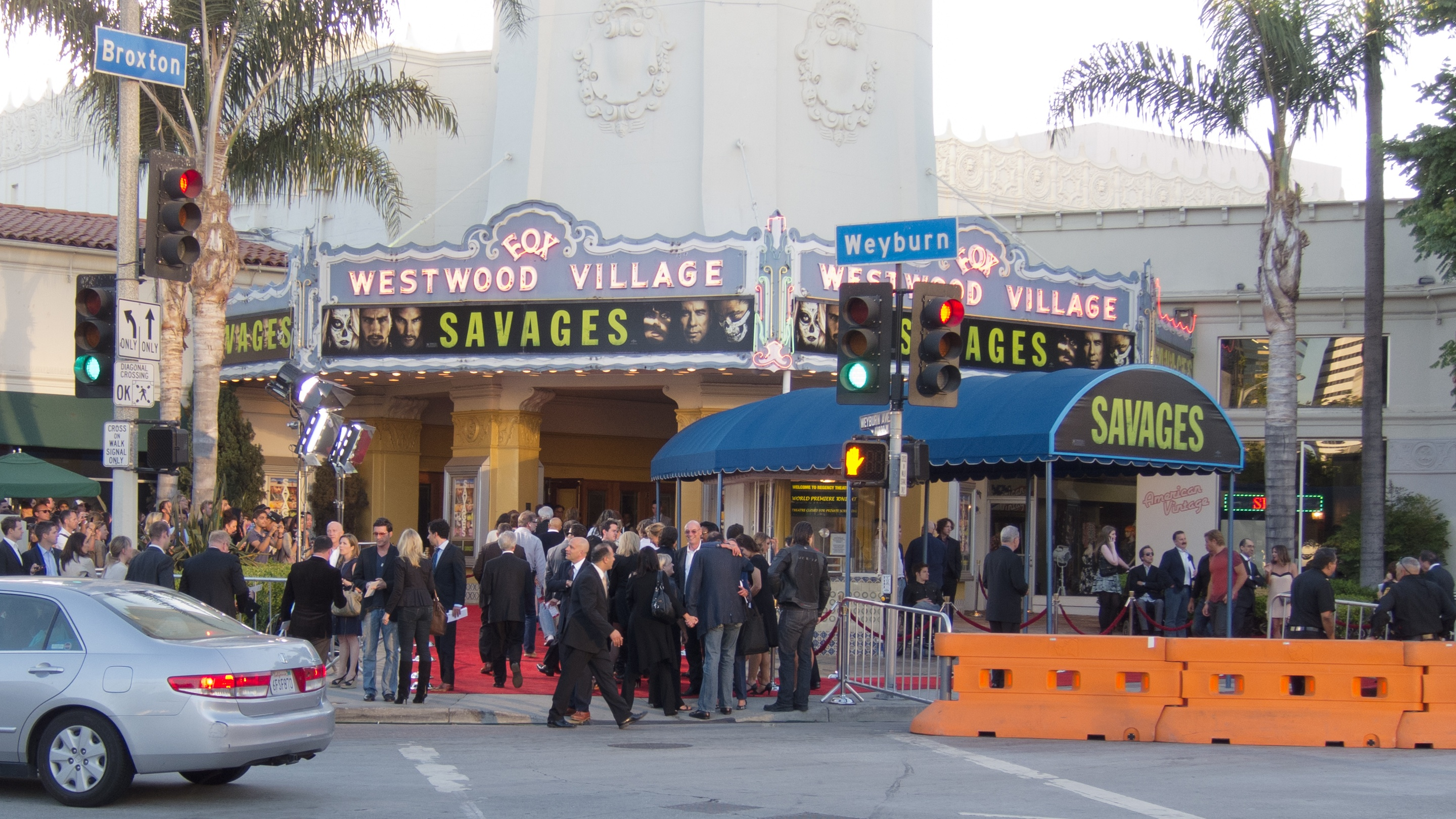
The red-carpet premiere at Fox Village Theater on June 25, 2012.

On Rotten Tomatoes, the film holds an approval rating of 50% based on 195 reviews. The site's critics consensus reads, "It's undeniably messy, but Savages finds Oliver Stone returning to dark, fearlessly lurid form." Metacritic assigned the film a weighted mean an average score of 59 out of 100, based on 41 critics, indicating "mixed or average reviews". Audiences surveyed by CinemaScore gave the film a grade "C+" on scale of A+ to F.

The film was somewhat better received in Europe. UK film and music journalist Dylan B Jones praised it, claiming director Oliver Stone had found "a magic strain of sultry sex, frantically emotional turmoil, and glossily savvy action sequences".

In a positive review, Roger Ebert of the Chicago Sun-Times praised Oliver Stone's direction, saying, "Much of the fascination of 'Savages' comes through Stone's treatment of the negotiations, which involve percentages, sliding scales over three years, an ultimate payout, and other financial details that drugs have in common with big business. It's spellbinding to watch the two sides trying to outthink each other."

HitFix's film critic Drew McWeeny gave the film an A− and called it "one of the most complete pleasures for me this summer". He was in general positive of the actors' performances; he described Lively's work as "smart and sad precisely because she plays O as such a broken, needy little soul" and praised the bond between Kitsch and Taylor-Johnson which "seems not only credible but lived in and authentic throughout the film." In comparison, MovieFix's film critic Connor Jason gave the film 2/5, noting that "Savages is a hot mess – beautiful actors and locations mixed with a plot that starts strong but ultimately turns into a snooze-fest. With a lead villain seemingly ripped from the cover of Cosmo magazine, Stone's latest flick savagely disappoints."

The film was nominated at the 2012 ALMA Awards in four categories including "Favorite Movie Actor", "Favorite Movie Actress—Drama/Adventure", "Favorite Movie Actor—Supporting Role", and "Favorite Movie Actress—Supporting Role" for Benicio Del Toro, Salma Hayek, Demián Bichir and Mia Maestro, respectively.

According to InSight Crime, the assertions used to promote the movie "are not only false but promote a dangerously misleading view of the country's criminal groups." According to the article, in a televised interview Oliver Stone made a series of unfounded and false assertions to justify his opposition to the war on drugs, fueling a "dystopian narrative of Mexico" and feeding on the belief that the Mexican criminals are "invincible supermen."
