= Usher's Passing =

1984 novel by Robert McCammon

- First edition
- Author: Robert McCammon
- Cover artist: Wendell Minor
- Language: English
- Genre: Historical fiction, Gothic fiction
- Set in: Asheville, North Carolina
- Publisher: Holt, Rinehart, and Winston
- Publication date: 1984
- Publication place: United States
- Media type: Print (Hardcover)
- Pages: 401

Usher's Passing is a Gothic historical fiction novel by American writer Robert McCammon. It was published in 1984 by Holt, Rinehart, and Winston. It focuses on the divide between an aristocratic family (the Ushers) (much like the Vanderbilts) and a community of hill people near Asheville, North Carolina. Both are drawn into a plot surrounding a string of child disappearances, a mysterious serial killer, and ghouls and monsters that lie buried deep within the Ushers' family history, and the answers to which lie deep within the sprawling, creaky mansion they call home.
