= Mine (novel) =

Novel written by Robert R. McCammon

- First edition (publ. Pocket Books); Cover artist: Tom Hallman
- Author: Robert R. McCammon
- Publisher: Pocket Books
- ISBN: 978-0-671-66486-2

Mine is a novel written by American author Robert R. McCammon. It won the 1990 Bram Stoker Award for Best Novel.

== Plot summary ==
The novel tells the story of Laura Clayborne, a successful journalist, the wife of a stockbroker and mother-to-be. With her life seemingly falling apart, Laura hopes that her newborn son, David, will make her life everything it ought to be.

Mary Terrell, aka Mary Terror, is a survivor of the radical 1960s and once a member of the fanatical Storm Front Brigade. Mary lives in a hallucinatory world of memories, guns, and above all, murderous rage. After viewing an ad placed in a popular magazine, she becomes convinced that the former leader of the Brigade, Lord Jack, is commanding her to bring him the child she was carrying when her life was suddenly turned upside down.

Mary steals Laura's baby and the manhunt is on. With no help at all Laura sets out on a cross-country trip to reclaim that which is hers. But soon Laura realizes that in order to get back her son and her life she may have to become as savage as the woman she's hunting.
