= Boy's Life (novel) =

Book by Robert R. McCammon

- Author: Robert R. McCammon
- Language: English
- Genre: Mystery
- Publisher: Pocket Books
- Publication date: 1991
- Publication place: United States
- Media type: Print (Hardback & Paperback)
- Pages: 440 (Original Hardcover)
- ISBN: 978-0-671-74226-3
- OCLC: 23771248
- Dewey Decimal: 813/.54 20
- LC Class: PS3563.C3345 B6 1991

Boy's Life is a 1991 novel by New York Times bestselling author Robert R. McCammon. It received the World Fantasy Award for Best Novel in 1992.

The story is set in the early 1960s and makes observations about changes in America at that time, with particular emphasis on the Civil Rights Movement. Several of the characters are connected to the Ku Klux Klan, and the segregation of the black community is dealt with in some detail.

== Synopsis ==
The book deals with 12-year-old Cory Mackenson, who grows up in the town of Zephyr, Alabama. The story begins as Cory's father, Tom, takes Cory on his daily milk route one morning, and while driving by Saxon's Lake (an old quarry filled with water) they see a car with a man behind the wheel drive straight into the lake. Tom jumps in and tries to save the man as the car sinks to the bottom, only to discover that he is already dead, having been beaten viciously and handcuffed to the steering wheel; his only identification is a tattoo of a skull with wings sprouting from the head. Tom cannot free the body and the car plummets three hundred feet down to the bottom of the lake. The memory of the car disappearing into the depths and the realization that there is evil in the small town of Zephyr is disturbing to Cory's father, who is haunted by this event in his dreams.

Cory is a writer and throughout the book he has many adventures in his hometown, including helping a young boy through a flood, facing the town bullies, spending a horrid week with his grandfather, befriending the eccentric son of the town's richest man, exposing two KKK members and thwarting a racist plot, letting loose an abused rhinoceros, dealing with the death of his beloved dog and later, one of his friends, and witnessing a gunfight against the town mob. He also tries to find out who killed the man at Saxon's Lake. In the end the murderer is revealed to have been an escaped war criminal who has been posing as Dr. Lezander, the town veterinarian, who had been the officer in charge of physical examinations at a Nazi concentration camp in Germany; the man he killed had been hunting him. After revealing his true identity to Cory, he takes him hostage and tries to leave town, only to drive off of Route Ten into Saxon's Lake, where he saves Cory's life at the expense of his own, coming to rest near the body of his last victim.

In the epilogue, 27 or so years later, Cory has since become a big-city writer, married a woman named Sandy, and has a tomboy of a daughter named Skye. He comes back to what is left of Zephyr, where many residents have left or died, with most of his hometown in shambles. Cory then learns the town mansion has become an orphanage for boys, and that some of the town's members have moved in to help them. The book ends when Cory goes in to see them all again.
