= The Night Boat (book) =

1980 novel by Robert McCammon

- First edition
- Author: Robert McCammon
- Language: English
- Genre: Horror
- Published: 1980
- Publisher: Avon Books
- Publication place: United States
- Pages: 350

The Night Boat is a 1980 novel by Robert McCammon. It is about a marine salvage diver, David Moore, who uncovers a sunken U-boat underneath a Caribbean lagoon. The boat mysteriously rises to the surface, and the crew are revealed to be still alive.

== Reception ==
Publishers Weekly, reviewing the 2013 reprint, praised its "vividly visceral scenes", but faulted it for "obvious twists", and plotlines that "fizzle" in a "rushed, anticlimactic ending". Don D'Ammassa considered it to be "the most gripping of McCammon's early novels"; however, literary scholar Neil McRobert found it to be "unrepresentative of McCammon's oeuvre" and "derivative of more successful fiction by (a) more established author()."
