= The Power of the Dog (Winslow novel) =

2005 novel by Don Winslow

- Author: Don Winslow
- Language: English
- Genre: Thriller, crime, historical
- Publisher: Alfred A. Knopf
- Publication date: 2005
- Publication place: United States
- Media type: Print (Hardback & Paperback)
- Pages: 539
- ISBN: 0-375-40538-0
- OCLC: 56912098
- Dewey Decimal: 813/.54 22
- LC Class: PS3573.I5326 P69 2005
- Followed by: The Cartel (2015); The Border (2019)

The Power of the Dog is a 2005 crime/thriller novel by American writer Don Winslow, based on the DEA's involvement with the war on drugs. The book was published after six years of writing and research by the author.

== Plot summary ==
Winslow's novel describes three decades of the United States' war on drugs by following several main characters: The DEA agent Art Keller; Adán Barrera, who controls large parts of the drug trade from Mexico to the United States of America; the sex worker Nora Hayden; and Sean Callan, a gangster from the streets of New York. Agent Keller becomes obsessed with the Barrera family after they torture and kill a DEA agent in Mexico. Trying to avenge his colleague, Keller discovers massive involvement of the US and the Mexican governments in drug trade operations. The CIA prevents him from taking revenge on the drug cartels to combat left-wing activists in Latin America.

Winslow's novel exposes the brutality of the war on drugs with graphic scenes of torture and massacres. It also navigates through the inner workings of the drug trade and how different organizations collaborate to achieve their respective goals, from the Mexican drug cartels to the Vatican.

== Film adaptation ==
In 2015, 20th Century Fox paid $6 million for the film rights to both The Power of the Dog and its sequel, The Cartel, with Ridley Scott producing.

== Sequel ==
In 2015, the first sequel The Cartel, was published. It follows Keller from 2004 to 2014 as he continues to track down Barrera after he escapes from prison. In 2019, the final book in the three-part series, The Border, was published. It follows Keller as head of the DEA.
