= The Winter of Frankie Machine =

2006 thriller novel by American writer Don Winslow

- Book cover
- Author: Don Winslow
- Language: English
- Publisher: Knopf
- Publication date: September 26, 2006
- Publication place: United States
- Media type: Print (hardcover)
- Pages: 320
- ISBN: 1-4000-4498-7
- OCLC: 66393714
- Dewey Decimal: 813/.54 22
- LC Class: PS3573.I5326 W56 2006

The Winter of Frankie Machine is a 2006 thriller novel by American writer Don Winslow.

The book was a finalist for the Los Angeles Times Book Prize for Mystery/Thriller.

== Plot summary ==
Frank Machianno, a retired San Diego mafia hitman, cut his ties with the Mafia many years ago. However, one day, his past catches up with him as the boss of Los Angeles family calls in for a past favor. Frank must oversee a meeting between the Detroit Combination and the Los Angeles crime family. Unfortunately, the meeting is revealed to be a "set-up", a scheme to kill Frankie. Someone from Frank's past wants him dead, and Frank has to find out why, how, and when. The problem is that the list of candidates is sizable, and Frankie is rapidly running out of time.

== Origin of character name ==
"Frankie Machine" is the name of the card-dealing, heroin-addicted protagonist in Nelson Algren's 1949 novel The Man With the Golden Arm, a role played by Frank Sinatra in the 1955 film directed by Otto Preminger.

Frank Machin is also the name of the main character played by Richard Harris in Lindsay Anderson's feature film debut This Sporting Life.

== Film adaptation ==
In November 2005, prior to the publishing of The Winter of Frankie Machine, interest in a film adaptation was expressed by Tribeca Productions and actor Robert De Niro. The rights to the project were shopped to various studios, being acquired by Paramount Pictures. De Niro was attached to star in the lead role, and in September 2006, screenwriters Brian Koppelman and David Levien were hired to adapt the novel into a script. The writing team received a "rich" deal in the low seven figures. In October 2007, director Michael Mann was attached to film the project, titled simply Frankie Machine. Under the director's supervision, screenwriter Alex Tse was hired to revise the concept of the story.. De Niro later dropped the idea, to work on what would become The Irishman.

In 2015, director William Friedkin signed on to helm the adaptation, with potential casting choices for the lead role including Matthew McConaughey and Walton Goggins.

In June 2023, Christopher Storer was set to direct using a draft written by Koppelman & Levien.
