= Andrew Vachss =

American writer and lawyer (1942–2021)

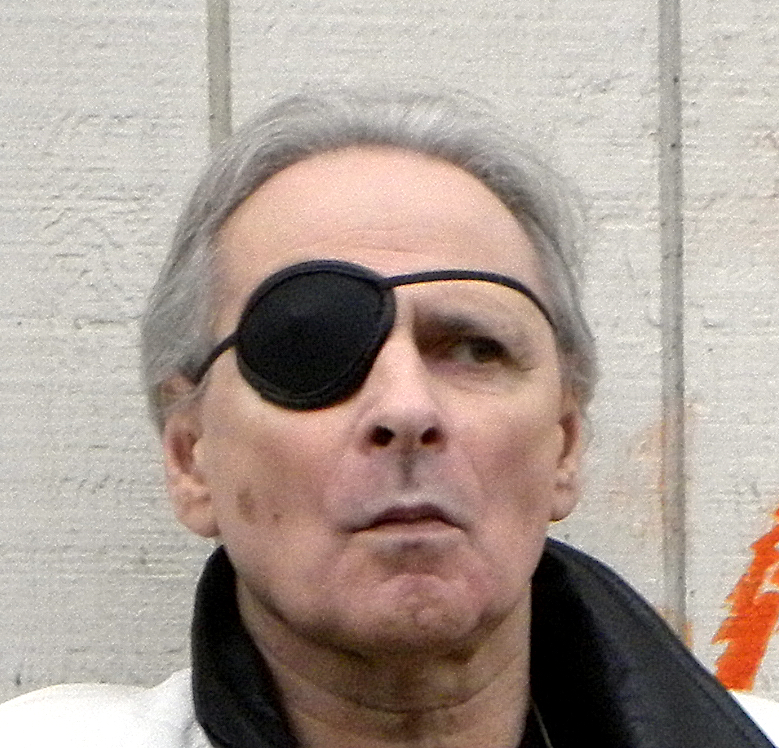
- Vachss in 2011
- Born: October 19, 1942; New York City, U.S.
- Died: November 23, 2021 (aged 79); Pacific Northwest, U.S.
- Occupations: Juvenile lawyer; crime writer
- Writing career
- Language: English
- Genre: Crime novel
- Notable work: The Burke series
- Website: vachss.com

Signature
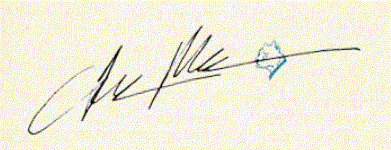

Andrew Henry Vachss (/væks/ VAX; October 19, 1942 – November 23, 2021) was an American crime fiction author, child protection consultant, and attorney exclusively representing children and youths.

== Early life and career ==
Vachss grew up in Manhattan on the Lower West Side. Before becoming a lawyer, Vachss held many front-line positions in child protection. He was a federal investigator in sexually transmitted diseases, and a New York City social-services caseworker. He worked in Biafra, entering the war zone just before the fall of the country. There he worked to find a land route to bring donated food and medical supplies across the border after the seaports were blocked and Red Cross airlifts banned by the Nigerian government; however, all attempts ultimately failed, resulting in rampant starvation.

After he returned and recovered from his injuries, including malaria and malnutrition, Vachss studied community organizing in 1970 under Saul Alinsky. He worked as a labor organizer and ran a self-help center for urban migrants in Chicago. He then managed a re-entry program for ex-convicts in Massachusetts, and finally directed a maximum-security prison for violent juvenile offenders.

As an attorney, Vachss represented only children and adolescents. In addition to his private practice, he served as a law guardian in New York state. In every child abuse or neglect case, state law requires the appointment of a law guardian, a lawyer who represents the child's interests during the legal proceedings.

== Writings ==
Andrew Vachss was the author of 33 novels and three collections of short stories, as well as poetry, plays, song lyrics, and graphic novels. As a novelist, he was perhaps best known for his Burke series of hardboiled mysteries; Another Life constituted the finale to the series.

After completing the Burke novels, Vachss began two new series. Vachss released the first novel in the Dell & Dolly trilogy, entitled Aftershock, in 2013. The second novel, Shockwave, was released in 2014, and Signwave, the final book, was published in June 2015. Departing from Vachss' familiar urban settings, the trilogy focuses on Dell, a former soldier and assassin, and Dolly, a former nurse with Doctors Without Borders and the love of Dell's life. While living in the Pacific Northwest, Dell and Dolly use their war-honed skills to maintain a "heads on stakes" barrier against the predators who use their everyday positions in the community as camouflage to attack the vulnerable.

The Cross series uses distinctive supernatural aspects to further explore Vachss' argument that society's failure to protect its children is the greatest threat to the human species. In 2012, Vachss' published Blackjack: A Cross Novel, featuring the mercenary Cross Crew, introduced in earlier Vachss short stories as Chicago's most-feared criminal gang. Urban Renewal, the second novel in the Cross series, came out in 2014. The third in the series, Drawing Dead, was released in 2016.

In addition to the Aftershock, Burke, and Cross series, Vachss wrote several stand-alone works. The first novel he published outside the Burke series was Shella. Released in 1993, Shella was the most polarizing of his works in terms of critical response. Vachss often referred to Shella as his "beloved orphan" until the 2004 release of The Getaway Man, a tribute to the Gold Medal paperback originals of the 1960s. In 2005, Vachss released the epic Two Trains Running, a novel which takes place entirely during a two-week span in 1959, a critical period in American history. In form, Two Trains Running presents as a work composed entirely of transcribed surveillance tapes, akin to a collage film constructed only of footage from a single source. His 2009 novel, Haiku, focuses on the troubled lives of a band of homeless men in New York City, struggling to connect with and protect each other. In 2010, Vachss published two books: his novel The Weight, is a noir romance involving a professional thief and a young widow in hiding. Heart Transplant, an illustrated novel in an experimental design, tells the story of an abused and bullied young boy who finds his inner strength with the help of an unexpected mentor. That's How I Roll, released in 2012, chronicles the death-row narrative of a hired killer as he reveals the secrets of his past, both horrifying and tender.

Vachss collaborated on works with authors Jim Colbert (Cross, 1995) and Joe R. Lansdale (Veil's Visit, 1999). He also created illustrated works with artists Frank Caruso (Heart Transplant, 2010) and Geof Darrow (Another Chance to Get It Right, 1993; The Shaolin Cowboy Adventure Magazine, 2014). Vachss' graphic novel, Underground, was released in November 2014.

Vachss also wrote non-fiction, including numerous articles and essays on child protection and a book on juvenile criminology. His books have been translated into 20 languages, and his shorter works have appeared in many publications, including Parade, Antaeus, Esquire, Playboy, and The New York Times. Vachss' literary awards include the Grand Prix de Littérature Policière for Strega [as La Sorcière de Brooklyn]; the Falcon Award, Maltese Falcon Society of Japan, for Strega; the Deutscher Krimi Preis for Flood [as Kata]; and the Raymond Chandler Award for his body of work.

Andrew Vachss was a member of PEN and the Writers Guild of America. His autobiographical essay was added by invitation to Contemporary Authors in 2003.

=== Child protection ===
Many of Vachss' novels feature the shadowy, unlicensed investigator Burke, an ex-con, career criminal, and deeply conflicted character. About his protagonist, Vachss said:

If you look at Burke closely, you'll see the prototypical abused child: hypervigilant, distrustful. He's so committed to his family of choice—not his DNA-biological family, which tortured him, or the state which raised him, but the family that he chose—that homicide is a natural consequence of injuring any of that family. He's not a hit man. But he shares the same religion I do, which is revenge.

— Andrew Vachss, Horror Online, May 1999.

Vachss coined the phrase "Children of the Secret", which refers to abused children, of whatever age, who were victimized without ever experiencing justice, much less love and protection. In the Burke novels, some of these Children of the Secret have banded together as adults into what Vachss called a "family of choice". Their connection is not biological, and they form very loyal bonds. Most are career criminals; none allows the law to come before the duty to family.

Vachss originated the term "Circle of Trust." which has since entered general circulation. Vachss coined the term to combat the mistaken over-emphasis on "stranger danger," a bias that prevents society from focusing on the most common way children are accessed for victimization:

The biggest threat to children is always inside their houses. The predator with the ski-mask who grabs the kid out of a van, while a real thing, is a tiny percentage of those who prey upon children. Most victimization of children is within the Circle of Trust—not necessarily a parent, but somebody who was let into that circle, who can be a counselor, or a coach, or someone at a day-care center. The biggest danger to children is that they're perceived as property, not human beings.

— An Interview with Andrew Vachss, The AV Club, November 1996.

Another term Vachss originated is "Transcenders."

I believe that many people who were abused as children do themselves—and the entire struggle—a disservice when they refer to themselves as "survivors." A long time ago, I found myself in the middle of a war zone. I was not killed. Hence, I "survived." That was happenstance ... just plain luck, not due to any greatness of character or heroism on my part. But what about those raised in a POW camp called "childhood?" Some of those children not only lived through it, not only refused to imitate the oppressor (evil is a decision, not a destiny), but actually maintained sufficient empathy to care about the protection of other children once they themselves became adults and were "out of danger." To me, such people are our greatest heroes. They represent the hope of our species, living proof that there is nothing bio–genetic about child abuse. I call them transcenders, because "surviving" (i.e., not dying from) child abuse is not the significant thing. It is when chance becomes choice that people distinguish themselves. Two little children are abused. Neither dies. One grows up and becomes a child abuser. The other becomes a child protector. One "passes it on." One "breaks the cycle." Should we call them both by the same name? Not in my book. (And not in my books, either.)

=== Dogs ===
Another important theme that pervades Vachss' work is his love of dogs, particularly breeds considered "dangerous," such as Doberman pinschers, rottweilers, and especially pit bulls. Throughout his writings, Vachss asserted that with dogs, just as with humans, "you get what you raise."

"There's a very specific formula for creating a monster," Vachss says. "It starts with chronic, unrelenting abuse. There's got to be societal notification and then passing on. The child eventually believes that what's being done is societally sanctioned. And after a while, empathy—which we have to learn, we're not born with it—cracks and dies. He feels only his own pain. There's your predatory sociopath." That's why Vachss posed for a recent publicity photo cradling his pit bull puppy. "You know what pit bulls are capable of, right?" he asks, referring to the animal's notorious killer reputation. "But they're also capable of being the most wonderful, sweet pets in the world, depending on how you raise them. That's all our children."

— "Unleashing the Criminal Mind," San Francisco Examiner, July 12, 1990.

He was a passionate advocate against animal abuse such as dog-fighting, and against breed-specific legislative bans. With fellow crime writer James Colbert, Vachss trained dogs to serve as therapy dogs for abused children. The dogs have a calming effect on traumatized children. Vachss noted that using these particular breeds further increases the victims' feelings of security; their "dangerous" appearance, in combination with the extensive therapy training, makes them excellent protection against human threats. During her time as chief prosecutor, Alice Vachss regularly brought one such trained dog, Sheba, to work with abused children being interviewed at the Special Victims Bureau.

== Personal life ==
When Vachss was 7 years old, an older boy swung a chain at his right eye. The resulting injuries damaged the eye muscles and resulted in his wearing an eyepatch. According to Vachss, his injured eye did not perceive light normally which led to a sensation like a strobe light flashing in his face when the eyepatch was removed; he attempted several surgeries to resolve the eye problem but none was successful.

Vachss had a small blue heart tattooed on his right hand.

Vachss' wife, Alice, was a sex crimes prosecutor, and she later became Chief of the Special Victims Bureau in Queens, New York. She is the author of the nonfiction book Sex Crimes: Ten Years on the Front Lines Prosecuting Rapists and Confronting Their Collaborators, a New York Times Notable Book of the Year. She has continued her work as Special Prosecutor for Sex Crimes in rural Oregon.

He died of coronary artery disease on November 23, 2021, at the age of 79 at his residence in Pacific Northwest.

== Honors and awards ==
=== Professional honors and awards ===
- A/V Peer Review (highest rating) by Martindale-Hubbell
- 2004, LL.D. (Hon.) Case Western Reserve University
- 2003, First Annual Harvey R. Houck Award (Justice for Children)
- 2003, First Annual Illuminations Award (St. Vincent's Center National Child Abuse Prevention Program)
- 1994, Childhelp Congressional Award
- 1976, John Hay Whitney Foundation Fellow
- 1970, Industrial Areas Foundation Training Institute Fellow

=== Literary honors and awards ===
- 2000, Raymond Chandler Award, Giurìa a Noir in Festival, Courmayeur, Italy, for body of writing
- 1989, Deutscher Krimi Preis, Die Jury des Bochumer Krimi Archivs, Germany, for Flood (as Kata)
- 1989, Maltese Falcon Award, Japan, for Strega
- 1988, Grand Prix de Littérature Policière, France, for Strega (as La Sorciere de Brooklyn)

== Bibliography ==
=== The Burke series ===
1. Flood (1985)
2. Strega (1987)
3. Blue Belle (1988)
4. Hard Candy (1989)
5. Blossom (1990)
6. Sacrifice (1991)
7. Down in the Zero (1994)
8. Footsteps of the Hawk (1995)
9. False Allegations (1996)
10. Safe House (1998)
11. Choice of Evil (1999)
12. Dead and Gone (2000)
13. Pain Management (2001)
14. Only Child (2002)
15. Down Here (2004)
16. Mask Market (2006)
17. Terminal (2007)
18. Another Life (2008)

=== The Cross series ===
1. Blackjack: A Cross Novel (2012)
2. Urban Renewal: A Cross Novel (2014)
3. Drawing Dead: A Cross Novel (2016)

=== The Aftershock trilogy ===
1. Aftershock (2013)
2. Shockwave (2014)
3. Signwave (2015)

=== Other novels ===
- Shella (1993)
- Batman: The Ultimate Evil (1995)
- The Getaway Man (2003)
- Two Trains Running (2005)
- Haiku (2009)
- The Weight (2010)
- A Bomb Built in Hell (Written 1973 and set in the Burke universe, but refused by publishers as too violent; first published as a German translation, Eisgott, in 2003, and an English publication in 2012)
- That's How I Roll (2012)
- Carbon (2019)
- Blood Line (2022)

=== Novelettes ===
- The Questioner (2018)

=== Short story collections ===
- Born Bad (1994)
- Everybody Pays (1999)
- Proving It (2001) audiobook collection.
- Dog Stories – online collection.
- Mortal Lock (2013)

=== Comic books and graphic novels ===
- Hard Looks (1992–93) – ten-issue series.
- Andrew Vachss' Underground (1993–1994) – four-issue series of illustrated and non-illustrated short stories. Contains Vachss' "Underground" stories (that are also featured in Born Bad), as well as stories by other authors that exist within Vachss' "Underground" world.
- Batman: The Ultimate Evil (1995) – two-issue adaptation of the novel.
- Cross (1995) – seven-issue series with James Colbert.
- Predator: Race War (1993) – five-issue series; (1995) collected edition.
- Alamaailma (1997) – Finnish graphic novel, illustrating two of the "Underground" short stories from Born Bad.
- Hard Looks (1996, 2002) – trade paperback.
- Another Chance To Get It Right: A Children's Book for Adults (1993, 1995) (reprinted with additional material and new cover, 2003, 2016)
- Heart Transplant (2010)
- Underground (2014)

=== Plays ===
- Placebo (in Antaeus, 1991)
- Warlord (in Born Bad, 1994)
- Replay (in Born Bad, 1994)

=== Non-fiction ===
- The Life-Style Violent Juvenile: The Secure Treatment Approach (Lexington, 1979)
- The Child Abuse-Delinquency Connection — A Lawyer's View (Lexington, 1989)
- Parade Magazine articles (1985–2006)
