= Carlos Hathcock =

United States Marine Corps sniper (1942–1999)

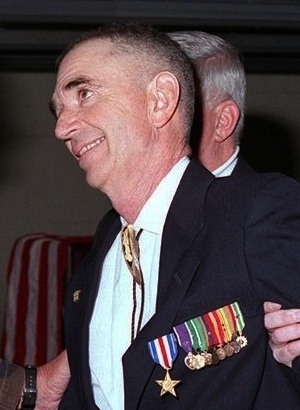
- Hathcock in 1996
- Born: Carlos Norman Hathcock II; May 20, 1942; Little Rock, Arkansas, U.S.
- Died: February 22, 1999 (aged 56); Virginia Beach, Virginia, U.S.
- Burial place: Woodlawn Memorial Gardens, Norfolk, Virginia, U.S.
- Spouse: Josephine Bryan (née Broughton) Hathcock (m. 1962)
- Children: Carlos Norman Hathcock III
- Military career
- Allegiance: United States of America
- Branch: United States Marine Corps
- Service years: 1959–1979
- Rank: Gunnery sergeant
- Nickname: "White Feather"
- Unit: 1st Marine Division
- Conflicts: Vietnam War
- Awards: Silver Star; Navy Commendation Medal; Purple Heart

Carlos Norman Hathcock II (May 20, 1942 – February 22, 1999) was a United States Marine Corps (USMC) sniper with a service record of 93 confirmed kills. His record and the extraordinary details of the missions he undertook made him a legend in the U.S. Marine Corps. He was honored by having a rifle named after him: a variant of the M21 dubbed the Springfield Armory M25 White Feather, for the nickname "White Feather" given to Hathcock by the North Vietnamese People's Army of Vietnam (PAVN).

== Early life and education ==
Hathcock was born in Little Rock, Arkansas, on May 20, 1942 to parents Carlos Norman Hathcock I (1919–1985) and Mae Thompson (1920–1989). He grew up in Wynne, Arkansas, living with his grandmother Myrtle (1900–2000) for the first 12 years of his life after his parents separated. While visiting relatives in Mississippi, he took to shooting and hunting at an early age, partly out of necessity to help feed his poor family. He hunted at that early age with a .22-caliber J. C. Higgins rifle. He would go into the woods with his dog and pretend to be a soldier and hunt imaginary Japanese soldiers with the German Mauser which his father, a veteran of two wars, brought back from World War II.

Hathcock dreamed of being a Marine throughout his childhood and so on May 20, 1959, his 17th birthday, he enlisted in the United States Marine Corps. He married Josephine "Jo" Bryan (née Broughton; 1930–2016) on the date of the Marine Corps birthday, November 10, 1962. Jo gave birth to a son, whom they named Carlos Norman Hathcock III.

== Career ==
Before deploying to South Vietnam, Carlos Hathcock had won shooting championships, including matches at Camp Perry near Port Clinton, Ohio, and the Wimbledon Cup. In 1966, he started his deployment in the Vietnam War as a military policeman and later became a sniper after Captain Edward James Land pushed the Marines into developing snipers in every platoon. Land later recruited Marines who had set their own records in sharpshooting; he quickly found Hathcock, who had won the Wimbledon Cup, the most prestigious prize for long-range shooting, at Camp Perry in 1965.

=== Confirmed kills ===
During the Vietnam War, Hathcock had 93 confirmed kills of People's Army of Vietnam (PAVN) and Viet Cong personnel. In the Vietnam War, kills had to be confirmed by the sniper's spotter and a third party, who had to be an officer. Snipers often did not have a third party present, making confirmation difficult, especially if the target was behind enemy lines, as was usually the case.

=== Confrontations with North Vietnamese snipers ===
The Viet Cong and PAVN called Hathcock Lông Trắng, translated as "White Feather", because of the white feather he kept in a band on his bush hat. After a platoon of Vietnamese snipers was sent to hunt down "White Feather", many Marines in the same area donned white feathers to deceive the enemy. The Marines were aware of the impact Hathcock's death would have and took it upon themselves to make themselves targets in order to confuse the counter-snipers.

One of Hathcock's most famous accomplishments was shooting an enemy sniper through the enemy's own rifle scope, hitting him in the eye and killing him. Hathcock and John Roland Burke, his spotter, were stalking the enemy sniper in the jungle near Hill 55, the firebase from which Hathcock was operating, southwest of Da Nang. The sniper, known only as the "Cobra", had already killed several Marines and was believed to have been sent specifically to kill Hathcock. When Hathcock saw a glint (light reflecting off the enemy sniper's scope) in the bushes, he fired at it, shooting through the scope and killing the sniper. Hathcock took possession of the dead sniper's rifle, hoping to bring it home as a "trophy", but after he turned it in and tagged it, it was stolen from the armory.

Hathcock said in interviews that he killed a female Viet Cong platoon leader called "the Apache woman", with a reputation for torturing captive Marines, around the firebase at Hill 55. However, scholars including Jerry Lembcke have expressed their skepticism for Hathcock's account and questioned the existence of "Apache".

Hathcock only once removed the white feather from his bush hat while deployed in Vietnam. During a volunteer mission days before the end of his first deployment, he crawled over 1,500 yards of field to shoot an enemy soldier who was alleged to have been a general. The effort took four days and three nights without sleep and with constant inch-by-inch crawling. Hathcock said he was almost stepped on as he lay camouflaged with grass and vegetation in a meadow shortly after sunset. At one point he was nearly bitten by a bamboo viper, but had the presence of mind to avoid moving and giving up his position. As the enemy exited his encampment, Hathcock fired a single shot which struck the target in the chest, killing him.

After this mission, Hathcock returned to the United States in 1967. However, he missed the Marine Corps, and returned to Vietnam in 1969, where he took command of a platoon of snipers.

=== Medical evacuation ===
On September 16, 1969, Hathcock's career as a sniper came to a sudden end along Highway 1, north of Landing Zone Baldy, when the LVTP-5 he was riding on struck an anti-tank mine. He pulled seven Marines from the flame-engulfed vehicle, suffering severe burns (some third-degree) to his face, arms, and legs, before someone pulled him away and placed him in water because he was unaware of how badly he had been burnt. While recovering, Hathcock received the Purple Heart. Nearly 30 years later, he received a Silver Star for this action. He and the seven Marines he pulled from the vehicle were evacuated by helicopter to USS Repose, a hospital ship, then to a naval hospital in Tokyo, and finally to the burn center at Brooke Army Medical Center in San Antonio, Texas.

=== Post-Vietnam War and health decline ===
After returning to active duty, Hathcock helped establish the Marine Corps Scout Sniper School at the Marine base in Quantico, Virginia. Due to the extreme injuries he suffered in Vietnam, he was in nearly constant pain, but continued to dedicate himself to teaching snipers. In 1975, his health began to deteriorate and he was diagnosed with multiple sclerosis. He stayed in the Marine Corps, but his health continued to decline. Just 55 days short of the 20 years which would have made him eligible for regular retirement pay, he received a permanent disability separation. Being medically discharged, he received 100 percent disability pay. He would have received only 50 percent of his final pay grade had he retired after 20 years. He fell into a state of depression when he was forced out of the Marines because he felt as if the service had kicked him out. During the depression, his wife Jo nearly left him but decided to stay. Hathcock eventually picked up the hobby of shark fishing, which helped him to overcome his depression.

Hathcock provided sniper instruction to police departments and select military units such as SEAL Team Six.

== Later life and death ==
Hathcock once said that he survived in his work because of an ability to "get in the bubble", to put himself into a state of "utter, complete, absolute concentration", first with his equipment, then his environment, in which every breeze and every leaf meant something, and finally his quarry. After the war, a friend showed Hathcock a passage written by Ernest Hemingway: "Certainly there is no hunting like the hunting of man, and those who have hunted armed men long enough and like it, never really care for anything else thereafter." He copied Hemingway's words on a piece of paper. "He got that right," Hathcock said. "It was the hunt, not the killing." He said in a book written about his career as a sniper: "I like shooting, and I love hunting. But I never did enjoy killing anybody. It's my job. If I don't get those bastards, then they're gonna kill a lot of these kids dressed up like Marines. That's the way I look at it."

Hathcock's son, Carlos Hathcock III, later enlisted in the U.S. Marine Corps; he retired from the Marine Corps as a Gunnery sergeant after following in his father's footsteps as a shooter and became a member of the Board of Governors of the Marine Corps Distinguished Shooters Association.

Hathcock died on February 22, 1999 in Virginia Beach, Virginia, aged 56, from complications resulting from multiple sclerosis. He is buried at Woodlawn Memorial Gardens in Norfolk, Virginia.

== Awards and decorations ==
Hathcock's awards include:

1st row	Silver Star		
2nd row	Purple Heart	Navy Commendation Medal	Navy Achievement Medal with "V" device
3rd row	Combat Action Ribbon	Navy and Marine Corps Presidential Unit Citation with 1 Service star	Marine Corps Good Conduct Medal with 1 Silver star (5 awards)
4th row	National Defense Service Medal	Vietnam Service Medal with 4 Campaign stars	Vietnam Gallantry Cross with Gold star
5th row	Vietnam Gallantry Cross Unit Citation with palm and frame	Vietnam Civil Actions Medal with palm and frame	Vietnam Campaign Medal with 1960- device
Badges	Marine Corps Rifle Expert Marksmanship Badge		Marine Corps Pistol Expert Marksmanship Badge

=== Silver Star citation ===
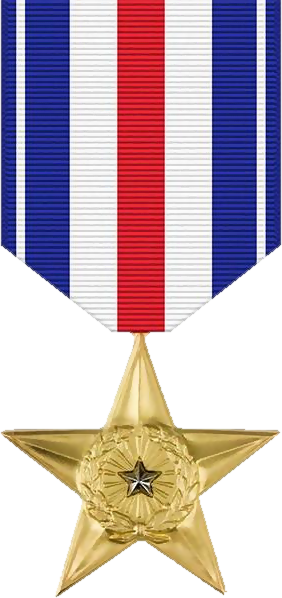

Citation:

The President of the United States of America takes pleasure in presenting the Silver Star to Staff Sergeant Carlos N. Hathcock, II (MCSN: 1873109), United States Marine Corps, for conspicuous gallantry and intrepidity in action while serving as a Sniper, Seventh Marines, FIRST Marine Division, in connection with military operations against the enemy in the Republic of Vietnam on 16 September 1969. Staff Sergeant Hathcock was riding on an Assault Amphibious Vehicle which ran over and detonated an enemy anti-tank mine, disabling the vehicle which was immediately engulfed in flames. He and other Marines who were riding on top of the vehicle were sprayed with flaming gasoline caused by the explosion. Although suffering from severe burns to his face, trunk, and arms and legs, Staff Sergeant Hathcock assisted the injured Marines in exiting the burning vehicle and moving to a place of relative safety. With complete disregard for his own safety and while suffering excruciating pain from his burns, he bravely ran back through the flames and exploding ammunition to ensure that no Marines had been left behind in the burning vehicle. His heroic actions were instrumental in saving the lives of several Marines. By his courage, aggressive leadership, and total devotion to duty in the face of extreme personal danger, Staff Sergeant Hathcock reflected great credit upon himself and the Marine Corps and upheld the highest traditions of the United States Naval Service.

== Legacy ==
Hathcock remains a legend in the U.S. Marine Corps. The Gunnery Sergeant Carlos Hathcock Award is presented annually by the National Defense Industrial Association "to recognize an individual who ...has made significant contributions in operational employment and tactics of small arms weapons systems which have impacted the readiness and capabilities of the U.S. military or law enforcement." The Marine Corps League (MCL) sponsors an annual program with 12 award categories including the Gunnery Sergeant Carlos N. Hathcock II Award, presented "to an enlisted Marine who has made an outstanding contribution to the improvement of marksmanship training." A sniper range named for Hathcock is at Camp Lejeune in North Carolina.

In 1967, Hathcock set the record for the longest sniper kill. He used an M2 .50 Cal Browning machine gun mounted with a telescopic sight at a range of 2,500 yd (2,286 m), killing a Viet Cong guerrilla. In 2002, the record was broken by Canadian snipers (Rob Furlong and Arron Perry) from the third battalion of Princess Patricia's Canadian Light Infantry during the War in Afghanistan. Hathcock's use of the M2 Browning machine gun encouraged the adoption of the .50 BMG cartridge as a viable sniper round.

Springfield Armory designed a highly accurized version of their M1A Supermatch rifle with a McMillan Stock and match-grade barrel and dubbed it the "M-25 White Feather". The rifle bore a likeness of Hathcock's signature and his "white feather logo" on the receiver. Turner Saddlery produced a line of leather rifle slings based on his design and embossed with Hathcock's signature. On March 9, 2007, the rifle and pistol complex at Marine Corps Air Station Miramar was officially renamed the Carlos Hathcock Range Complex.

=== Books ===
Hathcock is the subject of a number of books including:

- Henderson, Charles W. (1986). Marine Sniper: 93 Confirmed Kills. Stein and Day. ISBN 0-8128-3055-5.
  - Reissued as a paperback in 1988, ISBN 0-425-10355-2, OCLC 45427612
  - Reprinted 2001, ISBN 978-0-425-18165-2
- Sasser, Charles; Roberts, Craig (1990). One Shot, One Kill. Pocket Books. ISBN 978-0-671-68219-4.
- Chandler, Roy F. (1997). White Feather: Carlos Hathcock USMC scout sniper: an authorized biographical memoir. Iron Brigade Armory Publishing. ISBN 978-1-885633-09-5.
- Henderson, Charles W. (2003). Silent Warrior. Berkley Books. ISBN 978-0-425-18864-4.

== Weaponry ==
Hathcock generally used the standard sniper rifle: the Winchester Model 70 chambered for .30-06 Springfield cartridges, with the standard 8-power Unertl scope. He also used the M40 Remington 700 chambered in .308 with a Redfield 3-9x scope. On some occasions, however, he used a different weapon: the M2 Browning machine gun, on which he mounted an 8X Unertl scope, using a bracket made by metalworkers of the Seabees. Hathcock made a number of kills with this weapon in excess of 1,000 yards, including his record for the longest confirmed kill at 2,500 yards (since surpassed). Hathcock carried a Colt M1911A1 pistol as a sidearm.

== In popular culture ==
Hathcock's career as a sniper has been used as a basis for a variety of fictional snipers, from the "shooting through the scope incident" to the number of kills he made.

=== Film ===
- The H2 documentary, Sniper: Inside the Crosshairs (March 10, 2015), depicted a sniper team which successfully reenacted the "through the scope" shot.
- The 1993 film Sniper, starring Tom Berenger and Billy Zane, was loosely based on Hathcock's first Vietnam tour. Scenes include the "through the scope" shot, as well as the assassination of the general.
- The 1998 movie Saving Private Ryan reproduced the "through the scope" shot against a German sniper.

=== Television ===
- The Discovery Channel series MythBusters tested the question of shooting another sniper through his riflescope. Episode 67, entitled "Firearms Folklore" (November 29, 2006) featured the test: "Can a bullet travel through a sniper's scope and kill him?" Using a police industry standard SWAT sniper rifle and standard police match ammunition, the MythBusters fired several shots at a scoped rifle mounted on a ballistics gel dummy. The bullet was unable to hit the dummy: it was either stopped or deflected by the multiple layers of lenses in the scope, leaving the dummy relatively unharmed. Without any clear evidence that a bullet can penetrate a sniper scope, the MythBusters decided to label the myth as "busted". But, due to much debate by viewers, it was revisited in episode 75. Using a period-accurate scope (this story originates from reports of Carlos Hathcock in the Vietnam War and the scope used by Hathcock's opponent did not have the numerous internal optical elements of the scopes tested), it was found to be plausible.
- Hathcock was mentioned in the NCIS episode "One Shot, One Kill", when a white feather was found at two crime scenes where the victims were shot and killed by a sniper. The series' protagonist, Special Agent Leroy Jethro Gibbs, a former Marine scout sniper, realized the significance of the feather as the perpetrator's "calling card", referencing Hathcock's nickname during the Vietnam War ("White Feather Sniper"). He credits Hathcock with "39 confirmed kills", apparently having transposed the digits of Hathcock's actual 93 confirmed kills.
- Hathcock's duel with Cobra was mentioned in the History Channel Sniper - Inside The Crosshairs in 2016. As in Mythbusters, the show also tested the question of whether shooting a sniper through his scope was possible and came to the conclusion that it was highly plausible after four shots by a modern Marine sniper.

=== Social media ===
- The YouTube channel PewView undertook a more meticulous examination of the same claim. To replicate the incident, the hosts employed high-precision replicas of the original rifle and scope and a ballistic dummy gel head. The experiment was captured in ultra-high resolution using high-speed cameras to provide an unprecedented level of detail. The footage offers a frame-by-frame analysis of the bullet's trajectory, its interaction with the scope, and the subsequent impact on the target. The resulting footage provides an even more precise analysis of the bullet's path, showing that although it didn't completely penetrate the ballistic dummy, it successfully passed through the scope. While the hosts successfully recreated the feat, they acknowledged the extraordinary nature of Hathcock's original shot, attributing it to a combination of skill and chance. On the same day, fellow YouTube creator and collaborator The Fat Electrician uploaded an over-an-hour-long video detailing Hathcock's life.

=== Books ===
- Author Stephen Hunter on many occasions admitted that he took the inspiration for his series character Bob Lee Swagger from Hathcock.

== See also ==
- Jack Coughlin, a retired Marine sniper with more than 60 confirmed kills in Iraq and Somalia
- Richard O. Culver Jr. worked to establish the Marine Corps Scout Sniper School, where Hathcock served as his senior NCO
- Eric R. England holds the third-highest number of confirmed kills (98) for a Marine sniper
- Simo Häyhä, a Finnish sniper who killed over 500 Red Army enemy soldiers during the Winter War, 1939 - 1940
- Chris Kyle, a Navy SEAL with 160 kills in the Iraq War, the most of any U.S. sniper
- Chuck Mawhinney, who holds the highest number of confirmed kills (103) for a Marine sniper
- Adelbert Waldron, who once held the U.S. record for confirmed kills with 109 kills in Vietnam
- List of historically notable United States Marines

== Sources and further reading ==
- Chandler, Roy F. (1997). White feather: Carlos Hathcock USMC scout sniper: an authorized biographical memoir (1997 ed.). Iron Brigade Armory Publishing. ISBN 978-1-885633-09-5.
- Dockery, Kevin (2007). Stalkers and Shooters: A History of Snipers. Penguin. pp. 150–153. ISBN 978-0-425-21542-5.
- Dougan, Andy (2006). Through the Crosshairs: A History of Snipers (2006 ed.). Da Capo Press. ISBN 978-0-7867-1773-6.
- Henderson, Charles (2001). Marine Sniper: 93 Confirmed Kills. Penguin. ISBN 978-0-425-18165-2.
- Henderson, Charles W. (2003). Silent Warrior (2003 ed.). Berkley Books. ISBN 978-0-425-18864-4.
- Mann, Don (2011). Inside SEAL Team Six: My Life and Missions with America's Elite Warriors. Little, Brown and Company. ISBN 978-0-316-20429-3.
- Sasser, Charles; Roberts, Craig (1990). One Shot, One Kill (1990 ed.). Pocket Books. ISBN 978-0-671-68219-4.
- Roberts, Craig; Sasser, Charles W. (2004). Crosshairs on the Kill Zone: American Combat Snipers, Vietnam Through Operation Iraqi Freedom. Simon and Schuster. ISBN 978-1-4165-0362-0.
- Senich, Peter R. (1996). The one-round war: USMC scout-snipers in Vietnam (1996 ed.). Paladin Press. ISBN 978-0-87364-867-7.
- Kyle, Chris; McEwan, Scott; DeFelice, Jim (2012). American Sniper: The Autobiography of the Most Lethal Sniper in U.S. Military History. Harper Collins. ISBN 978-0-06-208235-0.

Records
Preceded by Billy Dixon	Longest confirmed combat sniper-shot kill 1967–2002; 2,286 m (2,500 yd/1.420 mi); Browning M2 w/.50 BMG	Succeeded by Arron Perry
