= Chuck Mawhinney =

United States Marine (1949–2024)

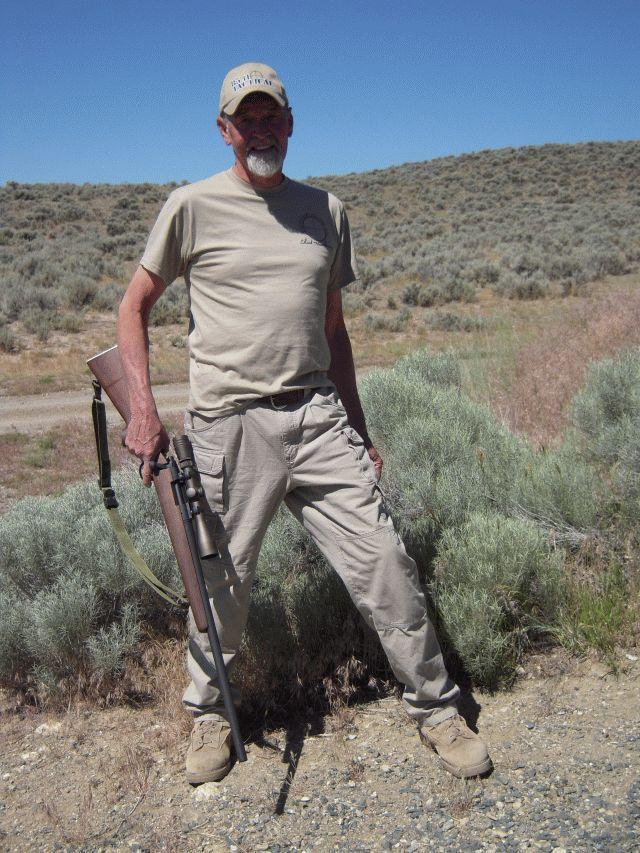
- Mawhinney in 2013 with a replica of the M40 sniper rifle he used during the Vietnam War
- Born: Charles Benjamin Mawhinney; February 23, 1949; Lakeview, Oregon, U.S.
- Died: February 12, 2024 (aged 74); Baker City, Oregon, U.S.
- Military career
- Branch: United States Marine Corps
- Service years: 1967–1970
- Rank: Sergeant
- Units: 1st Battalion, 5th Marine Regiment
- Conflict: Vietnam War
- Awards: Bronze Star Medal with Combat Valor; Navy and Marine Corps Achievement Medal; Navy and Marine Corps Commendation Medal with Combat Valor; Purple Heart (2)
- Other work: Road maintenance worker for the U.S. Forest Service; Public speaker

Charles Benjamin Mawhinney (February 23, 1949 – February 12, 2024) was a United States Marine Corps (USMC) sniper who holds the Corps' record for the most confirmed kills with 103, and 216 probable kills in 16 months during the Vietnam War.

== Service in the Vietnam War ==
Mawhinney, born оn February 23, 1949, in Lakeview, Oregon, was the son of a World War II Marine Corps veteran, and was an avid hunter in his youth. He graduated from high school in June 1967 and joined the U.S. Marine Corps later that year—after the deer season.

Following enlistment, he attended Scout Sniper School at Camp Pendleton and graduated in April 1968. From there he received orders to South Vietnam where upon arrival he was assigned as a rifleman to Lima Company 1st Battalion, 5th Marines, 1st Marine Division. He remained in this unit for three months until he was re-assigned to 5th Marine Regiment HQ Scout Sniper Platoon. There he worked as a scout sniper for different companies with the 1st, 2nd and 3rd Battalions. He also worked with the South Korean Marines, Force Recon, but the majority of his time was with Delta Company, 1/5 Marines. During this tour he is credited with 103 confirmed North Vietnamese Army (NVA) and Viet Cong (VC) kills and 216 probable kills. He spent 16 months in Vietnam, starting in early 1968.

"It was the ultimate hunting trip: a man hunting another man who was hunting me", Mawhinney told the Los Angeles Times. "Don't talk to me about hunting lions or elephants; they don't fight back with rifles and scopes. I just loved it." Mawhinney sought to change the public perception about snipers, who he maintained save lives by sapping the enemy's will to fight. "My rules of engagement were simple: If they had a weapon, they were going down. Except for an NVA paymaster I hit at 900 yards, everyone I killed had a weapon", he said.

After a chaplain declared him combat fatigued, Mawhinney returned to the United States and served briefly as a rifle instructor at Camp Pendleton.

== Civilian life and recognition ==
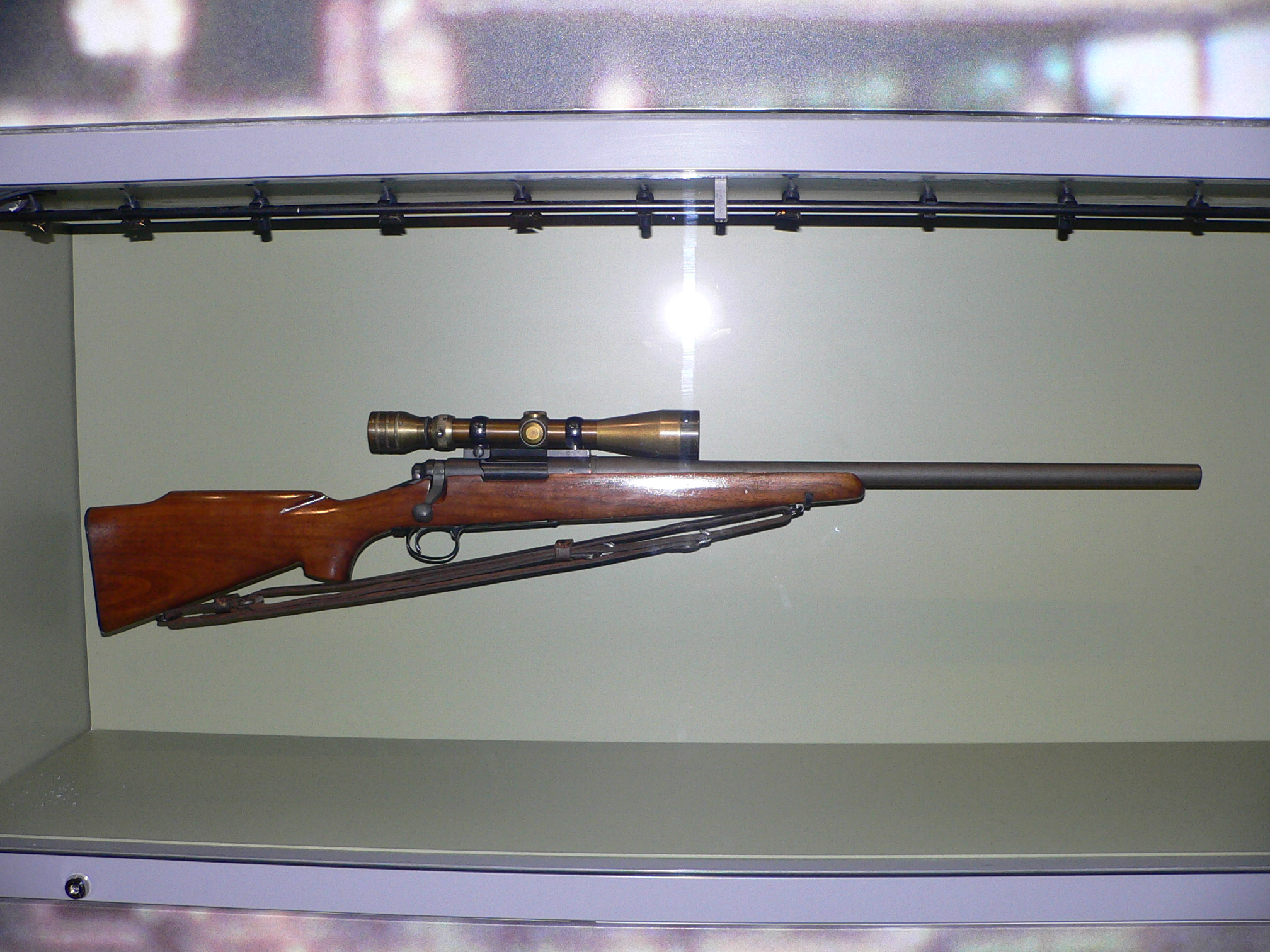
Mawhinney's M40 rifle is on display in the National Museum of the Marine Corps

After leaving the Marine Corps in 1970, Mawhinney worked for the U.S. Forest Service until his retirement in 1997, married his wife Robin and had three sons with her. He and his wife moved to Baker City, Oregon in 1981.

Mawhinney told no one about his service as a sniper, not even his wife. For more than two decades, his accomplishments as a sniper were almost entirely unknown—even Mawhinney himself did not know how his record compared to his peers.

In 1991, Mawhinney's exploits were recounted by fellow Marine sniper and author Joseph Ward in his book Dear Mom: A Sniper's Vietnam. Ward credited Mawhinney with 101 confirmed kills, which was controversial, as it was generally believed that the 93 confirmed kills by Carlos Hathcock was more than any other Marine sniper. Mawhinney's documented total was found to be 103 confirmed kills, with an additional 216 probable kills.

After the revelation of his record as a sniper, Mawhinney slowly increased his public profile. Following his retirement from the Forest Service, he began speaking at conventions and public events and attending national sniper shooting competitions. Mawhinney was a spokesman for Strider Knives, which produces a knife bearing his signature on the blade. One of these knives is awarded to the top graduate of each class from the USMC Scout Sniper School in Camp Pendleton. Beginning in 2006, Mawhinney spoke to classes of professional snipers in training.

One of the rifles he used in Vietnam is displayed in the Vietnam Gallery of the National Museum of the Marine Corps, where it has been shown since its opening in 2006.

One of Mawhinney's shots was recreated for the History Channel special, "Sniper: The Anatomy of the Kill".

Mawhinney later lived in Baker City, Oregon. He died there on February 12, 2024, at the age of 74. (Note: Several news outlets erroneously reported his age as 75.)

== See also ==
- Carlos Hathcock
- Eric England
- Adelbert Waldron
