= STA platoon =

U.S. Marine unit

STA platoons are the "Surveillance and Target Acquisition" platoons of the United States Marine Corps. They are assigned to the Headquarters and Service Company of a U.S. Marine rifle battalion and are the home of Marines working directly for the S-2 (Intelligence) that are specially trained at close range reconnaissance and information gathering for the battalion commander.

== Operations ==
These Marines work in small teams (as few as two or three men) employing ground surveillance radar and night observation devices to aid the battalion commander in locating the enemy at the forward edge of the battle area.

STA platoon is also the home of the Marine Scout-Snipers. Marine Scout Snipers can act on immediate information to reduce the enemy, deny the enemy access to flanks and protected areas, or slow the enemy's ability to maneuver through long-range precision fire.

The STA platoon is in use at the battalion and regimental level. They have seen heavy use since the first Gulf War up until OIF/OEF. The STA platoon is the "sharp edge of the sword" for the Marine Rifle Battalion.

== In popular culture ==
- Anthony Swofford's experiences in an STA platoon are recounted in his 2003 book, Jarhead, and the 2005 film of the same name.

== See also ==
- United States Marine Corps Scout Sniper
