= Apache (Viet Cong soldier) =

Apocryphal Viet Cong soldier

According to the American sniper Carlos Hathcock, Apache was a female sniper and interrogator for the Viet Cong during the War in Vietnam. While no real name is given by Hathcock, he states she was known by the US military as "Apache", because of her methods of torturing US Marines and ARVN troops for information and then letting them bleed to death. According to Hathcock, he killed her in 1966, when serving as part of a Marine Corps sniper team.

== Hathcock's account ==
In an interview conducted by John Plaster in 1984 and 1985, Hathcock stated that Apache led a platoon of snipers near Hill 55, just outside of Da Nang near the middle of present-day Vietnam, and had tortured South Vietnamese known to be friendly to US forces in hopes of drawing US forces into ambushes. Eventually, her team captured and skinned a US Marine. Hathcock and his officers determined that she was moving between specific, regular positions to stage the torture and successfully predicted her next position.

They spotted her team moving towards their predicted position, and identified Apache when she stopped to relieve herself. Jim Land, his commanding officer and spotter, called in artillery on the position and Apache fled for cover, ironically towards Hathcock position. Hathcock was able to successfully down her while she was on the run, and followed up with a second shot "for good measure"

In dramatised versions of Hathcock's life story, published by Charles Henderson, Apache is described as torturing captured US soldiers within earshot of their comrades. Hathcock's narrative suggests he shot Apache from a distance, working with Jim Land as a spotter.

== In popular culture ==
Hathcock's account of an encounter with Apache was the basis for an episode of The History Channel documentary series Sniper: Deadliest Missions.

== See also ==
- Colonel Tomb
