= List of After Words interviews first aired in 2020 =

After Words is an American television series on the C-SPAN2 network’s weekend programming schedule known as Book TV. The program is an hour-long talk show, each week featuring an interview with the author of a new non-fiction book. The program has no regular host. Instead, each author is paired with a guest host who is familiar with the author or the subject matter of their book.

First air date (Links to video)	Interviewee(s)	Interviewer(s)	Book	Topic of interview / Comments
January 4, 2020	Steven Greenhouse	Andy Levin	Beaten Down, Worked Up: The Past, Present, and Future of American Labor	
January 11, 2020	Peggy Orenstein	Jared Yates Sexton	Boys and Sex: Young Men on Hookups, Love, Porn, Consent, and Navigating the New Masculinity	
January 18, 2020	Rana Foroohar	Jon Fortt	Don’t Be Evil: How Big Tech Betrayed Its Founding Principles--And All of US	
February 1, 2020	Andrea Bernstein	Jonathan O'Connell	American Oligarchs: The Kushners, the Trumps, and the Marriage of Money and Power	
February 8, 2020	Howard Bryant	Etan Thomas	Full Dissidence: Notes from an Uneven Playing Field	
February 15, 2020	Sally Pipes	Buddy Carter	False Premise, False Promise: The Disastrous Reality of Medicare for All	
February 22, 2020	Nicholas Kristof and Sheryl WuDunn	Jeff Merkley	Tightrope: Americans Reaching for Hope	
February 29, 2020	Cal Thomas	Amanda Carpenter	America's Expiration Date: The Fall of Empires and Superpowers... and the Future of the United States	
March 7, 2020	Lee Drutman	Matthew Dallek	Breaking the Two-Party Doom Loop: The Case for Multiparty Democracy in America	
March 14, 2020	K. T. McFarland	Danielle McLaughlin	Revolution: Trump, Washington and "We the People"	
March 21, 2020	Jennifer Steinhauer	Chrissy Houlahan	The Firsts: The Inside Story of the Women Reshaping Congress	
March 28, 2020	Eilene Zimmerman	Leana Wen	Smacked: A Story of White-Collar Ambition, Addiction, and Tragedy	
April 4, 2020	Jonathan Karl	Mike McCurry	Front Row at the Trump Show	
April 11, 2020	Michelle King	Joanne Lipman	The Fix: Overcome the Invisible Barriers That Are Holding Women Back at Work	
April 18, 2020	Jim McKelvey	Cat Zakrzewski	The Innovation Stack: Building an Unbeatable Business One Crazy Idea at a Time	
June 28, 2020	Wes Moore	Heather McGhee	Five Days: The Fiery Reckoning of an American City	2015 Baltimore protests
July 4, 2020	Mary Jordan	Susan Page	The Art of Her Deal: The Untold Story of Melania Trump	Melania Trump
July 11, 2020	Dinesh D'Souza	Benjamin Powell	United States of Socialism: Who's Behind It. Why It's Evil. How to Stop It.	
July 18, 2020	Steven Levy	Rana Foroohar	Facebook: The Inside Story	Facebook
July 25, 2020	Pramila Jayapal	Jim Himes	Use the Power You Have: A Brown Woman's Guide to Politics and Political Change	
August 1, 2020	Michael Shellenberger	Andrew Revkin	Apocalypse Never: Why Environmental Alarmism Hurts Us All	
August 8, 2020	Zerlina Maxwell	Maria Kumar	The End of White Politics: How to Heal Our Liberal Divide	
August 15, 2020	John Yoo	Mark Rozell	Defender in Chief: Donald Trump's Fight for Presidential Power	
August 22, 2020	Debora MacKenzie	Claire Standley	COVID-19: The Pandemic that Never Should Have Happened and How to Stop the Next One	
August 29, 2020	Edward Ball	Sheryll Cashin	Life of a Klansman: A Family History in White Supremacy	
September 5, 2020	Joel Pollak	Matt Welch	Red November: Will the Country Vote Red for Trump or Red for Socialism?	
September 12, 2020	Sarah Huckabee Sanders	Jennifer Jacobs	Speaking for Myself: Faith, Freedom, and the Fight of Our Lives Inside the Trump White House	
September 19, 2020	Chris Murphy	Thomas Abt	The Violence Inside Us: A Brief History of an Ongoing American Tragedy	
September 26, 2020	Peter Strzok	Adam Goldman	Compromised: Counterintelligence and the Threat of Donald J. Trump	
October 3, 2020	Lou Dobbs	Victor Davis Hanson	The Trump Century: How Our President Changed the Course of History Forever	
October 10, 2020	John Brennan	Julian Barnes	Undaunted: My Fight Against America's Enemies, At Home and Abroad	
October 17, 2020	Candace Owens	Matt Schlapp	Blackout: How Black America Can Make Its Second Escape from the Democrat Plantation	
October 24, 2020	Al Sharpton	Jonathan Capehart	Rise Up: Confronting a Country at the Crossroads	
October 31, 2020	Gerald Seib	Karen Tumulty	We Should Have Seen It Coming: From Reagan to Trump--A Front-Row Seat to a Political Revolution	
November 7, 2020	Carlos Lozada	Pamela Paul	What Were We Thinking: A Brief Intellectual History of the Trump Era	
November 14, 2020	John Fabian Witt	Lawrence Gostin	American Contagions: Epidemics and the Law from Smallpox to COVID-19	
November 21, 2020	Deborah Stone	Cathy O'Neil	Counting: How We Use Numbers to Decide What Matters	
November 28, 2020	Sally Hubbard	David McLaughlin	Monopolies Suck: 7 Ways Big Corporations Rule Your Life and How to Take Back Control	
December 5, 2020	Kevin Williamson	Salena Zito	Big White Ghetto: Dead Broke, Stone-Cold Stupid, and High on Rage in the Dank Woolly Wilds of the "Real America"	
December 12, 2020	Christa Parravani	Alina Salganicoff	Loved and Wanted: A Memoir of Choice, Children, and Womanhood	
December 19, 2020	Ruth Ben-Ghiat	Sheri Berman	Strongmen: Mussolini to the Present	
December 26, 2020				
