= American River College =

Community college in Sacramento, California, US

Coordinates: 38°38′58″N 121°20′46″W

- Former names: Grant Technical School (1942–1945); Grant Technical College (1945–1955); American River Junior College (1955–1965)
- Type: Public community college
- Established: 1942; 84 years ago
- Parent institution: Los Rios Community College District
- President: Lisa Cardoza
- Students: 30,975 (Fall 2025)
- Location: Sacramento, California, United States
- Campus: suburban
- Colors
- Nickname: Beavers
- Mascot: Bucky the Beaver
- Website: arc.losrios.edu

American River College (ARC) is a public community college in unincorporated Sacramento, California. It is one of four colleges in the Los Rios Community College District and is part of the California Community Colleges System.

== History ==
It was originally opened as Grant Technical School in 1942 to aid in the World War II efforts. It was an addition to Grant Union High School, which opened in 1932, and was one-of-five high school aeronautical training programs in the country. In 1945 it became Grant Technical College, and it became American River Junior College (ARJC) in 1955. It moved from the old Grant Tech campus to its current location in 1958, occupying eight newly built office complexes and the original Cameron ranch house. In 1965, the college became a part of the Los Rios Community College District and officially became American River College. Today, along with Cosumnes River College, Folsom Lake College and Sacramento City College, ARC is directed by a seven-member board of trustees elected by voters residing in the district.

The climactic police showdown of the 1986 Emilio Estevez and Demi Moore film Wisdom was filmed on the American River campus, including in and around Beaver Stadium.

During the period of 2004–2013, the college opened a variety of new facilities, including buildings for health education, theater & music, kinesiology, and life science and fine arts. In addition, the college also expanded its bookstore and library and opened a new student center and parking garage. In 2014, the college opened the 19,000 square foot Evangelisti Culinary Arts Center, which houses the college's hospitality management program and student-run Oak Cafe restaurant and bakery. In 2021, the college opened the 57,000 square foot Diane Bryant STEM Innovation Center, which houses a variety of academic programs.

In 2008, the student body association supported California Proposition 8 which sought to restrict marriage to opposite-sex couples. In 2010, the board of trustees lost a lawsuit against the student body association regarding the college's invalidation of their votes for student trustee.

== Campus ==
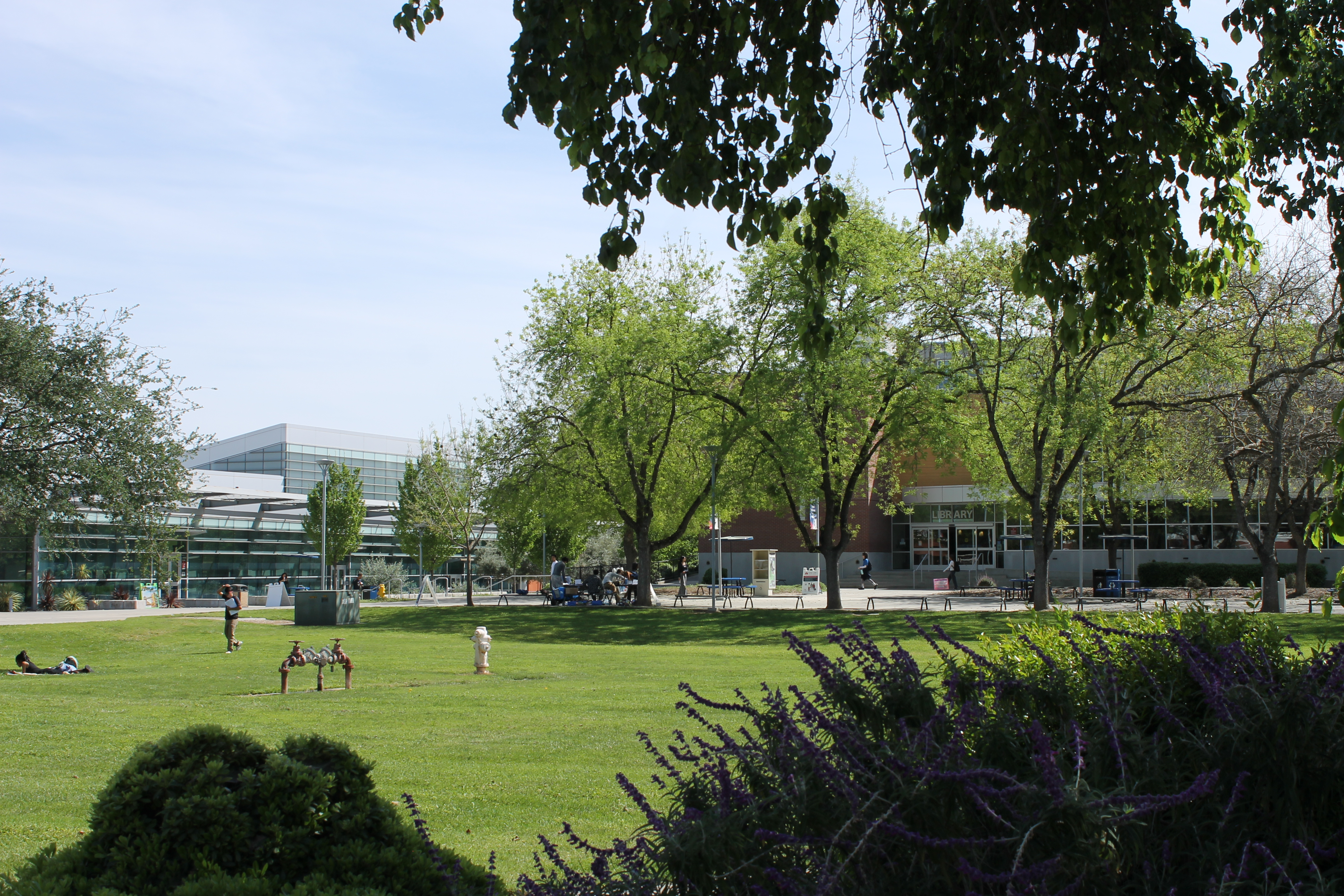
View from the quad, showing the Student Center and Library.

The college occupies a 155-acre (63 ha) site on the old Cameron Ranch in northern Sacramento County.

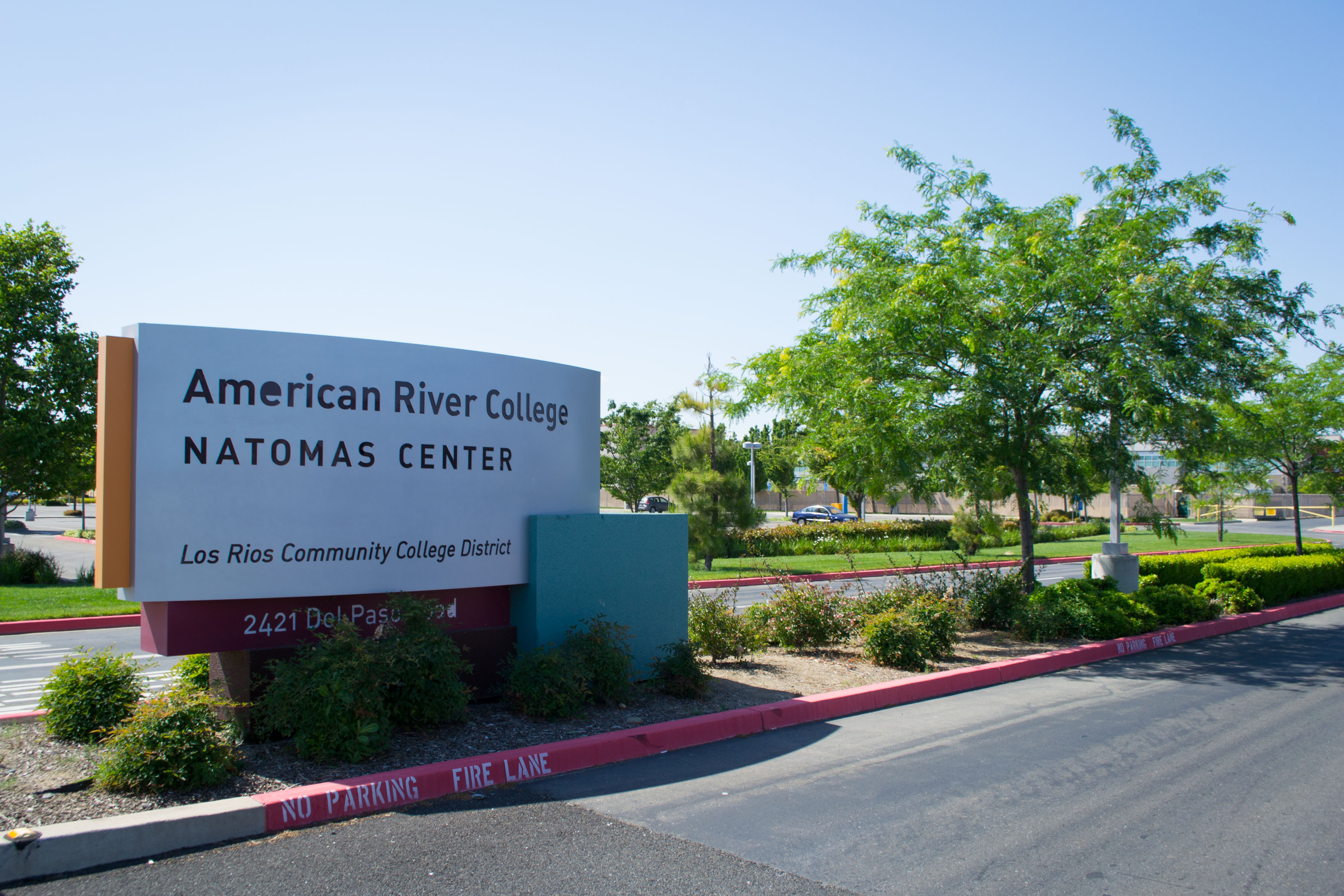
Sign outside the college's Natomas Center

== Students ==
The college enrolls about 30,000 full-time and part-time students, making it one of the largest community colleges in California. ARC has published its own literary journal since 1984, the American River Review.

== Student life ==
The campus has its own newspaper, the American River Current, and its own English as a Second Language newsletter, The Parrot.

Student demographics as of Fall 2023
| Race and ethnicity | Total |
|---|---|
| White | 36% |
| Hispanic | 32% |
| Asian | 10% |
| African American | 7% |
| Unknown | 6% |
| Multiracial | 5% |
| Filipino | 2% |
| American Indian/Alaska Native | 1% |
| Pacific Islander | 1% |

=== Athletics ===
The college athletics teams are nicknamed the Beavers.

== Notable people ==
- Lloyd Connelly – California Superior Court judge and former California State Assembly member
- Ward Connerly – Former UC Regent and political activist
- Wally Herger – Member, United States House of Representatives (California, 2nd Congressional District)
- Ewa Klamt – German politician and Member of the European Parliament for Lower Saxony
- Adrian Lamo – Former grey-hat computer hacker, key figure in Chelsea Manning case, journalist
- Joan Lunden – TV host/personality
- Brian Posehn – Comedian, co-star of The Sarah Silverman Program
- Anthony Padilla – Co-founder of Smosh
- Ian Hecox – Co-founder of Smosh
- Anthony Swofford – Author of Jarhead
- Richard Trenton Chase – Serial killer

=== Notable sportspeople ===
- Steve Andrade – professional baseball player
- Dusty Baker – professional baseball player and manager
- Devontae Booker – professional football player
- Dallas Braden – professional baseball player
- Jarrett Bush – professional football player
- Tony Eason – professional football player
- Joseph Fatu, professional wrestler better known by his ring name Solo Sikoa
- Robert Hight – professional racecar driver
- Steve Holm – professional baseball player
- Mike Lincoln – professional baseball player
- Don Lofgran – professional basketball player
- Jim Loscutoff – professional basketball player
- Bill McNulty – professional baseball player
- Debbie Meyer – Olympic swimmer
- Bob Oliver – professional baseball player
- Manny Parra – professional baseball player
- John Vukovich – professional baseball player and manager
- Gerald Willhite – professional football player
