= Anthony Swofford =

American writer and former U.S. Marine (born 1970)

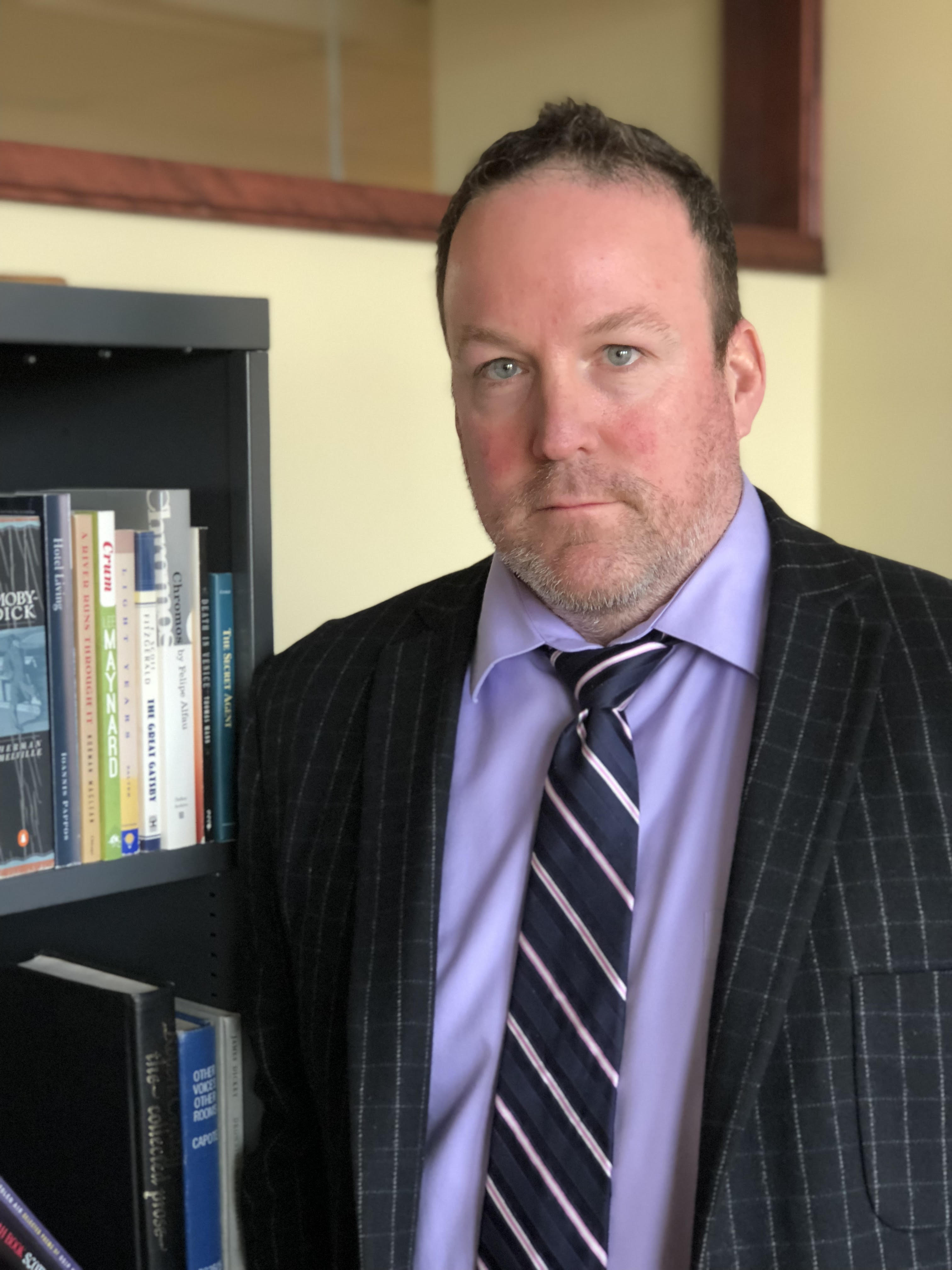
- Swofford in 2018
- Born: August 12, 1970 (age 56); Fairfield, California, U.S.
- Military career
- Allegiance: United States
- Branch: United States Marine Corps
- Service years: 1988–1991
- Rank: Corporal
- Nickname: "Swoff" "Tony"
- Units: STA platoon, 2nd Battalion, 7th Marines
- Conflicts: Persian Gulf War
- Other work: Jarhead (2003), professor, writer

Anthony Swofford (born August 12, 1970) is an American writer and U.S. Marine veteran, best known for his 2003 book Jarhead, based heavily on his accounts of various situations encountered in the Persian Gulf War. This memoir was the basis of the 2005 film of the same name, directed by Sam Mendes.

== Early life and education ==
Swofford was born on August 12, 1970, in Fairfield, California, into a military family. He grew up living on a military base. His father had served in the Vietnam War, and before that his grandfather had fought in World War II. In fact, he was conceived in Honolulu while his father was on a five-day break from fighting in the Vietnam War.

In his own words, Swofford describes his younger self, before and during his tenure in the U.S. Marine Corps, as "a reader and a loner".

Terrified of being a failure in a "normal" life, Swofford wanted to join the Marines from an early age, as he saw it as "an entry into manhood". However, Swofford's father was against his joining, and the first of two recruiters to visit were escorted from the house. Swofford's father had said, "I know some things about the military that they don't show you in the brochures."

== Career ==
=== Military ===
Swofford joined the U.S. Marine Corps at the age of 18, and shortly after he turned 20 he was deployed to Riyadh, Saudi Arabia, awaiting the start of the Persian Gulf War.

He was a lance corporal while serving as a Scout Sniper Trainee with the Surveillance and Target Acquisition (STA) Platoon of 2nd Battalion, 7th Marines.

Following the war, Swofford was promoted to corporal. He was uncomfortable with the notion that he was a hero, and deliberately missed the homecoming parade near his base. As far as he was concerned, he had simply done his job and wanted to forget it.

=== Return to civilian life ===
After leaving the U.S. Marine Corps following the end of the war in the Gulf, Swofford at first found it difficult to adapt to civilian life, due to extreme combat-related PTSD. In his own words, it felt "strange to be in a place without having someone telling me to throw my gear in a truck and go somewhere".

Swofford returned to the United States, doing a variety of jobs to pay his way. His first job upon his return to civilian life was as a bank teller; however, after only a few months he was robbed at gunpoint, which led him to quit. Swofford also found work in warehouses.

=== Writing ===
While attending American River College, a community college in Sacramento, Swofford was published in and was the-editor-in-chief of the American River Review, an award-winning literary magazine. Later, he received a Bachelor's degree in English from University of California, Davis, and earned a Master of Fine Arts from the Iowa Writers' Workshop, at the University of Iowa.

Swofford committed himself to writing in 1995, at the age of 24, and built on the encouragement he received at college to write Jarhead, which documents his time spent in the Gulf. In the book he portrays a grim view of life as a Marine, and indeed shows himself in a rather unflattering light. He said himself, "I could have written a flattering portrait of myself as a young Marine, but it would have been a much lesser book." Reviewing Jarhead for The New York Times, Michiko Kakutani said the book combined "the black humor of Catch-22 with the savagery of Full Metal Jacket and the visceral detail of The Things They Carried." In 2004, he received the PEN/Martha Albrand Award for the Art of the Memoir for Jarhead.

Following his time at the University of Iowa, Swofford served as an English professor at Lewis and Clark College, where he taught a class in the school's "Inventing America" program, and St. Mary's College of California, until he sold the film rights to Jarhead. Swofford has had articles, both fiction and non-fiction, published in The New York Times, Harper's, Men's Journal, The Iowa Review, and other publications. He is a Michener-Copernicus Fellowship recipient and currently teaches creative writing at Carnegie Mellon University. His first novel, Exit A, was published in January 2007. Exit A chronicles the life of a boy who grows up on an American Air Force Base in Japan and falls in love with the base general's daughter.

=== Television and film ===
Swofford co-produced and narrated the 2006 documentary Semper Fi, is featured in Richard E. Robbins’s documentary Operation Homecoming, and has made appearances on several talk shows and in documentaries.

== Personal life ==
He is married to Christa Parravani.

== In popular culture ==
- Swofford is portrayed by American actor Jake Gyllenhaal in the 2005 film Jarhead, based on his 2003 book of the same name.
- Jarhead helped popularize the phrase "the suck", (usually preceded by welcome to or embrace).

== Bibliography ==
- Swofford, Anthony (2003). Jarhead: A Marine's Chronicle of the Gulf War. Scribner. ISBN 0-7432-3535-5.
- Swofford, Anthony (2007). Exit A: A Novel. Scribner. ISBN 978-0-7432-7038-0.
- Swofford, Anthony (2012). Hotels Hospitals and Jails: A Memoir. Twelve. ISBN 978-1-4555-0673-6.
- Swofford, Anthony (2013). Death of an American Sniper: The Extraordinary Life and Tragic End of Navy SEAL Chris Kyle, the Country's Most Lethal Soldier. Byliner Inc.

== See also ==
- List of United States Marines
- Generation Kill, a 2004 memoir by Evan Wright, deals with similar experiences. It was made into an HBO miniseries.
