= Richard O. Culver Jr. =

American military officer (1936–2014)

Major Richard O. Culver Jr.
- Born: Richard Otis Culver Jr. April 9, 1936; Alcatraz Island, California, U.S.
- Died: February 24, 2014 (aged 77); Hayden, Idaho, U.S.
- Burial place: Arlington National Cemetery
- Military career
- Allegiance: United States
- Branch: United States Marine Corps
- Service years: 1958–1975
- Rank: Major
- Nicknames: Dick, The Jouster
- Units: Company H, 2nd Battalion, 3rd Marines, 9th Marine Amphibious Brigade
- Commands: Marine Corps Scout Sniper School
- Conflicts: Vietnam War
- Awards: Silver Star; Purple Heart
- Other work: author

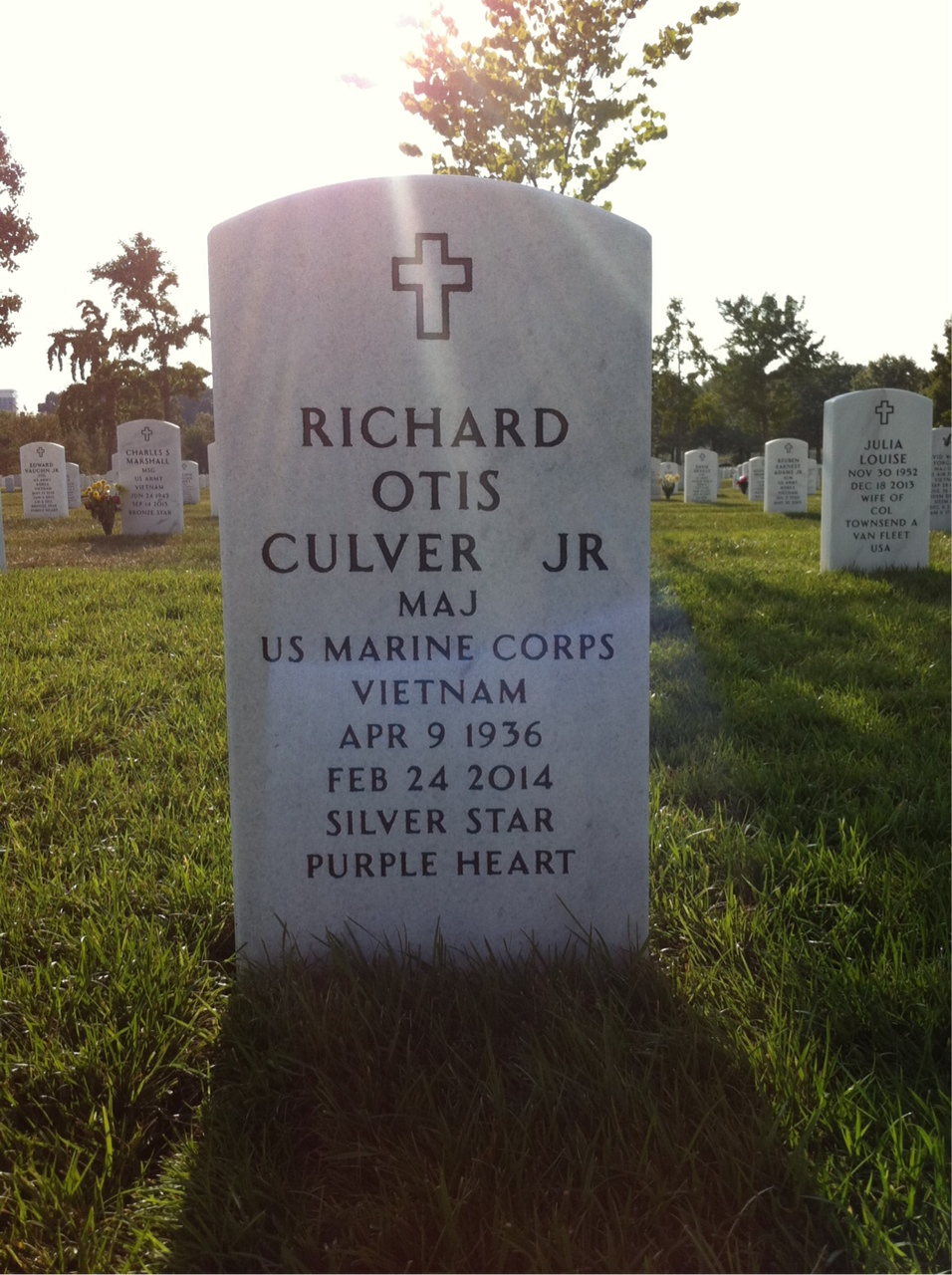
Grave at Arlington National Cemetery

Richard Otis "Dick" Culver Jr. (April 9, 1936 – February 24, 2014) was a decorated United States Marine Corps officer who was one of the founders of the Marine Corps Scout Sniper School in Quantico, Virginia. Culver served in combat in Vietnam and was awarded the Silver Star for his heroic actions during a firefight in 1967.

== Early life ==
Richard Otis Culver Jr. was born on Alcatraz Island on April 9, 1936 to Richard and Sara Culiver. His family lived on the island as his father, Richard Otis Culver, Sr., was a correction officer at the Alcatraz Federal Penitentiary. Richard Jr. was the first child born on the island while it was a Federal Penitentiary. His father was a retired Marine Corps lieutenant colonel who had served in the Banana Wars and in China.

Culver's family moved to Hopewell, Virginia, where he attended elementary school and completed his high school education.

Culver enlisted in the Marine Corps at age 17. He graduated from high school in 1954 and then attended Virginia Military Institute (VMI), where he was a member of the Marine Corps Reserves. While at VMI, he competed as captain of the VMI Pistol team, and on the Marine Corps Reserve Rifle and Pistol team at the National Matches. He earned his bachelor's degree in physics in 1958. He later earned a master's degree in physics.

== Marine Corps service ==
Culver enlisted into active service in the US Marine Corps on November 11, 1958. He subsequently attended Officer Candidate School (OCS) and was commissioned as a Marine Corps second lieutenant.

=== Vietnam War ===
Culver served two combat tours in Vietnam. In his first tour, from 1967 to 1968, he was wounded on his first day in combat and awarded the Purple Heart. After recovering, he led reconnaissance patrols. He then saw combat experience with the infantry, where he served as a company commander. While serving as the commanding officer of H Company, 2nd Battalion, 3rd Marines, in Vietnam, Culver was awarded the Silver Star for his actions on July 21, 1967, during a firefight with a North Vietnamese Army company. As described in his obituary, he "exposed himself to fire several times, rallied his Marines, coordinated fire and medevacs, called in artillery and air support, and forced the enemy to break contact after suffering numerous casualties".

Culver had a second tour to Vietnam from 1971 to 1972.

=== Sniper school ===
After the Vietnam War, the Marine Corps moved forward with forming a permanent Scout Sniper program. Together with Major Edward James Land (who was Culver's commanding officer in Vietnam), Culver helped form, and was the first commander of, the first Marine Corps Scout Sniper School at Quantico, Virginia. Culver's senior NCO was famed Marine Corps sniper GySgt Carlos Hathcock.

Culver was a member and later commanding officer of the Marine Corps Rifle and Pistol team, earning several medals in competition.

== Silver Star citation ==
For heroism in combat on July 21, 1967, when a captain in the United States Marine Corps, in Company H, 2nd Battalion, 3rd Marines, 9th Marine Amphibious Brigade:

The President of the United States of America takes pleasure in presenting the Silver Star to Captain Richard O. Culver, Jr. (MCSN: 0-75696), United States Marine Corps, for conspicuous gallantry and intrepidity in action while serving as the Commanding Officer of Company H, Second Battalion, Third Marines, Ninth Marine Amphibious Brigade, in the Republic of Vietnam on 21 July 1967. While engaged in a company-size search and destroy mission near the village of Ap Sieu Quan during Operation BEAR CHAIN, Captain Culver had established a defensive perimeter outside the village and had deployed one platoon to search the area when the entire company came under intense small arms and automatic weapons fire form an estimated North Vietnamese Army company firing from entrenched, heavily-fortified positions and sustained several casualties. Reacting immediately, he displayed exceptional courage and leadership as he exposed himself to hostile fire to move forward to a vantage point where he could more advantageously observe the action and direct the fire and movement of his men. He found that the Marines were temporarily pinned down by fire being delivered from a tree line 300 meters distant from his defensive perimeter and from positions within the village. Exhibiting an extensive knowledge of tactics, Captain Culver quickly consolidated his position, established a base of fire to cover the evacuation of the wounded and maneuvered the search platoon back to the perimeter. He then called for gunship, fixed wing and artillery support. Completely disregarding his own safety, he repeatedly moved about the perimeter in the face of heavy North Vietnamese fire to encourage his men, ensure the security of each firing position and direct the fire of the company mortars. When the gunships arrived, Captain Culver accurately directed their fire against hostile positions seventy-five meters from the front elements of his unit. Oblivious to the danger to his own life, he continued to expose himself to North Vietnamese fire to adjust rocket fire on other enemy positions. After the fixed wing aircraft arrived, he skillfully adjusted their runs directly on top of the enemy bunkers and trench lines. When all the aircraft had expended their ordnance and departed, Captain Culver called in heavy artillery and accurately adjusted their fire. Establishing a well-integrated night defensive perimeter, he was able to provide security not only for his company but also for 250 refugees who had fled to the Marines for protection. Leading a coordinated two-platoon attack against the enemy the following morning, he found that the North Vietnamese had been successfully routed and had left five dead, one rifle, several grenades, demolitions and numerous pieces of equipment. By his superior leadership, bold initiative and selfless devotion to duty at great personal risk, Captain Culver upheld the highest traditions of the Marine Corps and of the United States Naval Service.

== Post-Marine Corps ==
After retiring from the Marine Corps, Culver spent four years in Saudi Arabia training their Marine Corps school. He then returned to the U.S., to Kellogg, Idaho, where he spent five years as the high school's JROTC senior instructor.

In retirement, Culver wrote about the Marine Corps and his experiences.

On February 24, 2014, Culver died at age 77 at Hospice House in Hayden, Idaho. He was survived by his wife and son. On May 24, 2014, Major Culver was buried in Arlington National Cemetery with full military honors.

== See also ==
- Carlos Hathcock - famed Marine Corps sniper.
- Edward James Land - worked with Culver in establishing the first Scout Sniper School.
- United States Marine Corps Scout Sniper
