= United States Marine Corps Scout Sniper Association =

- Formation: 2004
- Type: Nonprofit 501(C)(3) Corporation
- Purpose: Veterans services
- Headquarters: Stafford, Virginia
- CEO: Chris Sharon
- Staff: 15
- Website: Official website

United States Marine Corps Scout Sniper Association SSA is a non-profit & veterans service organization that offers a variety of programs, services and events for veterans of the United States Marine Corps who served as a United States Marine Corps Scout Sniper. It operates as a non-profit 501(c)(19) organization.

The organization is composed of approximately 800 former and active Scout Snipers and serves to support its members and their families as well as the families of fallen Marine Corps Scout Snipers. In January 2017, the SSA presented the National Rifle Association (NRA) with a plaque and appreciation for their continued support of the SSA and the Marine Corps.
