= American River Review =

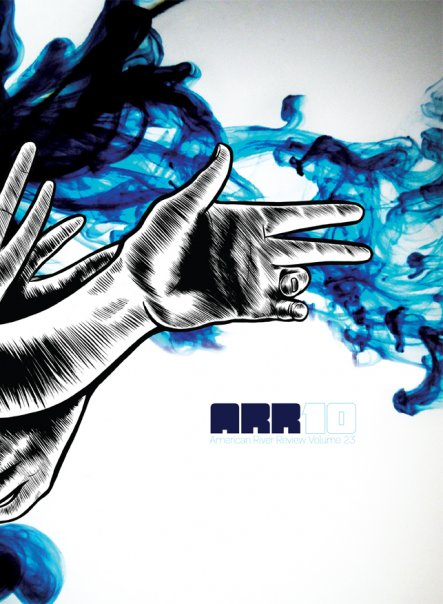
- Discipline: Literary journal
- Language: English

Publication details
- History: 1984 - present
- Publisher: American River College (United States)
- Frequency: Annually

Standard abbreviations
- ISO 4: Am. River Rev.

Indexing
- OCLC no.: 23729723

Links
- Journal homepage

American River Review is a literary journal, first published in 1984, by students and faculty of American River College (ARC). An entirely student-produced magazine, the faculty at ARC facilitate in the financial and legal facets of production. Students are responsible for every creative aspect of production including writing, editing, accepting or rejecting submissions, final copy proofing, and the production of art, graphic design, and layout. The headquarters is in Sacramento, California.

The American River Review has expanded the scope of its coverage annually. It currently showcases prose, poetry, fashion, culinary, and visual arts. The 2011 edition included a DVD featuring interviews with staff members and footage of the ARC theater department's dramatic interpretations of the literary pieces.

To date, the American River Review has received the title of Best in the Nation in the Community College Humanities Association Literary Magazine Competition on nine separate occasions. It is currently the only literary magazine in the nation to have received this award more than twice.

== Notable staff ==
- Anthony Swofford
