= Diane Bryant =

American businesswoman

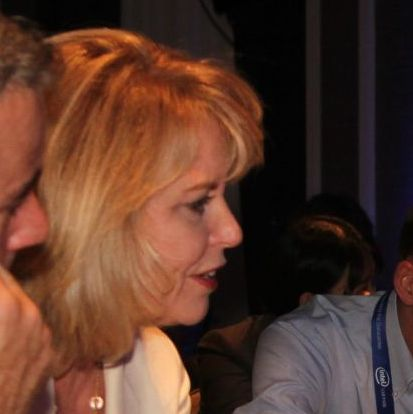
- Diane Bryant in 2013
- Born: February 1962 (age 63); Fair Oaks, California, United States
- Occupation: Independent board member at Broadcom Inc.
- Known for: Former chief operating officer of Google Cloud Platform
- Board member of: Broadcom Inc. United Technologies

Diane Bryant is as an independent director and member of the compensation committee at Broadcom Inc. Prior, she was the chief operating officer of the Google Cloud Platform and she previously served as the group president of Intel's data center group.

== Career ==
After graduating from college, Bryant began working at Intel in 1985. In her final role at Intel, she led the data center group. In this role she helped the company to become a significant supplier of chips to corporate clients such as Amazon AWS, when previously Intel had primarily sold chips directly to consumers. Before leading the data center group, Bryant was the chief information officer of Intel.

In May 2017, she left her role at Intel in what was described as a temporary departure. However, on November 30, 2017, Google announced that Bryant would be joining Google Cloud as chief operating officer, and Intel announced her retirement effective December 1, 2017. In July 2018, Google announced that she had left the company.

Bryant is a member of the board of United Technologies.

Bryant was named among Fortune’s 50 Most Powerful Women in Business in 2015 and 2016. Also in 2016, World Affairs honored Bryant as a part of its Global Philanthropy Forum. Business Insider ranked Bryant #32 in their 2016 list of "Silicon Valley 100" and she was #6 in their 2018 list of the "most powerful female engineers".

On January 14, 2019, Bryant was named a member of the board of Broadcom Inc.

Bryant has served as the chairman and chief executive officer of NovaSignal Corporation from January 2020 to June 2023.

== Personal life ==
Diane was born and raised in Fair Oaks, California. Upon graduating from high school, Bryant took classes at American River College. She then transferred to the University of California, Davis, where she graduated with a bachelor's degree in electrical engineering in 1985.
