= Jarhead (film) =

2005 film directed by Sam Mendes

- Theatrical release poster
- Directed by: Sam Mendes
- Screenplay by: William Broyles Jr.
- Based on: Jarhead by Anthony Swofford
- Produced by: Douglas Wick; Lucy Fisher
- Starring: Jake Gyllenhaal; Peter Sarsgaard; Chris Cooper; Lucas Black; Jamie Foxx
- Cinematography: Roger Deakins
- Edited by: Walter Murch
- Music by: Thomas Newman
- Production companies: Universal Pictures; Neal Street Productions; MP Kappa Productions; Red Wagon Entertainment
- Distributed by: Universal Pictures
- Release date: November 4, 2005
- Running time: 123 minutes
- Countries: United States; Germany; United Kingdom
- Language: English
- Budget: $72 million
- Box office: $97.1 million

Jarhead is a 2005 biographical war drama film based on the 2003 memoir of the same name by Anthony Swofford, chronicling his military service in the United States Marine Corps during the Persian Gulf War. Directed by Sam Mendes, the film stars Jake Gyllenhaal as Swofford with Jamie Foxx, Peter Sarsgaard, Lucas Black, and Chris Cooper.

Universal Pictures released the film November 4, 2005 to mixed reviews from critics. It grossed $97 million at the box office against a $72 million budget. Named for the military slang among U.S. Marines, the film spawned a direct-to-video series of three subsequent films, none of which are related to the original and all of which invert its theme and perspectives.

== Plot ==
In 1989, Anthony "Swoff" Swofford, whose father served in the earlier Vietnam War (1955–1975), attends United States Marine Corps recruit training before being stationed at Camp Pendleton, California. Claiming that he joined the military because he "got lost on the way to college", Swofford finds his time at Camp Pendleton difficult and struggles to make friends. Although Swofford feigns illness to avoid his responsibilities, a "lifer", Staff Sergeant Sykes, takes note of his potential and offers Swofford an opportunity to attend his competitive Scout Sniper course.

After gruelling training, eight Marines graduate: among them Swofford, now a sniper, and Swofford's roommate Corporal Alan Troy, who becomes his spotter. When Kuwait is invaded by Iraq, Swofford's unit is deployed to Saudi Arabia as a part of "Operation Desert Shield" in the Gulf War (1990–1991). Eager for combat, the Marines find themselves bored with their remedial training, constant drills, and routine responsibilities. The monotony prompts many to talk about the unfaithful girlfriends and wives waiting for them at home. They even erect a bulletin board featuring annotated photographs revealing what perfidies the women had committed (known in military slang as a "Jodie Wall").

Swofford obtains unauthorized alcohol and organizes an impromptu Christmas party, arranging for Fergus to cover his watch so he can celebrate. Fergus accidentally sets fire to a tent while cooking some sausages and ignites a crate of flares, waking the whole camp and enraging Staff Sergeant Sykes. Afterwards, instead of assigning blame to Fergus, Swofford accepts full responsibility for the incident. Consequently, Swofford is demoted from lance corporal to private and receives latrine duty as punishment, which involves burning human waste from the camp with diesel fuel. The punishments, combined with the heat, the boredom, and Swofford's suspicions of his girlfriend's infidelity, give Swofford a mental breakdown, to the point where he threatens Fergus with an M16 rifle and then demands that Fergus shoot him.

Later, Operation Desert Storm begins and the Marines are sent to the Kuwait–Saudi Arabia border. Swofford learns from Sykes that Troy concealed his criminal record when enlisting and will be discharged when the unit returns home. Troy becomes distant from his friends. Knowing that Troy will not be allowed to reenlist, the Marines attack him with a red-hot USMC branding iron, marking him as one of their own. Shortly afterward, the Marines come under Iraqi artillery fire, and Swofford dodges the barrage to recover batteries for a radio to call in strikes on the enemy positions. It turns out he recovered dead batteries but it's irrelevant as the Iraqi forces have begun to retreat with the Marines now in pursuit. Following an accidental air attack from friendly forces, the Marines advance through the desert, facing no enemies on the ground. The Marines march through the infamous "Highway of Death" (on the northbound road leading back to Iraq from capital Kuwait City), strewn with the burnt vehicles and charred bodies of retreating Iraqi soldiers, the aftermath of a bombing campaign. The Marines later catch sight of distant burning Kuwaiti oil wells, ignited only moments before by retreating Iraqis, and they attempt to dig sleeping holes as a rain of crude oil falls from the sky. Before they can finish, Sykes orders the squad to move upwind.

Near the end of the war, Swofford and Troy are finally given a sniping mission. Lieutenant Colonel Kazinski, their battalion commander, orders them to kill at least one of two high-ranking Iraqi Republican Guard officers at a nearby airfield. At the last second before Swofford takes the shot, Major Lincoln interrupts them to call in an air strike. Troy desperately pleads to make a kill, but is denied and overruled as the airplanes destroy the Iraqi airfield, much to his and Swofford's disappointment. The war ends without Swofford ever firing his rifle. During a monologue, Swofford realizes that all of his training and effort to achieve the elite status as a marine sniper is meaningless in modern warfare.

The Marines return home on a transport bus which is boarded by a Vietnam-era Marine veteran who congratulates them, to their obvious discomfort. They later parade through a town in a jovial celebration of victory. Swofford returns home to his family and girlfriend but his girlfriend's infidelity is confirmed. Fowler is seen with a prostitute in a bar, now as a Corporal, Kruger in a corporate boardroom, Cortez as a father of three children, Escobar as a supermarket employee and Sykes continuing his service as a first sergeant in the Iraq War. Later, Swofford learns of Troy's death during a surprise visit from Fergus. At Troy's funeral, they reunite with former comrades. The film ends as Swofford imagines being "still in the desert" as a Marine.

== Cast ==
- Jake Gyllenhaal as Lance Corporal / Private / Corporal Anthony Swofford
- Scott MacDonald as Drill Instructor Fitch
- Peter Sarsgaard as Corporal Alan Troy
- Jamie Foxx as Staff Sergeant Sykes
- Lucas Black as Lance Corporal Chris Kruger
- Brian Geraghty as Private First Class Fergus O'Donnell
- Iván Fenyő as Private First Class Pinko
- Jacob Vargas as Private First Class Juan Cortez
- Laz Alonso as Lance Corporal Ramon Escobar
- Jocko Sims as Julius
- Evan Jones as Private First Class Dave Fowler
- Chris Cooper as Lieutenant Colonel Kazinski
- Dennis Haysbert as Major Lincoln
- John Krasinski as Corporal Harrigan
- Jamie Martz as Foster
- Rini Bell as Swoff's sister
- Brianne Davis as Kristina

== Reception ==
=== Box office ===
Jarhead grossed $27.7 million domestically during its opening weekend, ranking second behind Chicken Little. The film went on to gross $62.7 million in the United States and Canada and $34.4 million internationally for a worldwide total of $97.1 million.

=== Critical response ===
On Rotten Tomatoes, the film has an approval rating of 60% based on 197 reviews. The site's consensus states: "This first-person account of the first Gulf War scores with its performances and cinematography but lacks an emotional thrust." On Metacritic, the film has a weighted average score of 58 out of 100, based on 40 critics, indicating "mixed or average reviews". Audiences polled by CinemaScore gave the film an average grade of "B" on an A+ to F scale.

Roger Ebert gave the movie three-and-a-half out of four stars, crediting it for its unique portrayal of Gulf War Marines who battled boredom and a sense of isolation rather than enemy combatants. Entertainment Weekly magazine gave the film a "B+" rating and Owen Gleiberman wrote:

Jarhead isn't overtly political, yet by evoking the almost surreal futility of men whose lust for victory through action is dashed, at every turn, by the tactics, terrain, and morality of the war they're in, it sets up a powerfully resonant echo of the one we're in today.

In his review for the Washington Post, Stephen Hunter praised Jake Gyllenhaal's performance: "What's so good about the movie is Gyllenhaal's refusal to show off; he doesn't seem jealous of the camera's attention when it goes to others and is content, for long stretches, to serve simply as a prism through which other young men can be observed". Sight and Sound magazine's Leslie Felperin wrote, "If nothing else, Jarhead provides some kind of reportage of a war whose consequences we haven't yet begun to understand, a war now elbowed into history by its still-raging sequel". In a two-and-a-half out of five review, Ty Burr of The Boston Globe stated that "the film evokes Three Kings, Full Metal Jacket, Catch-22, and other touchstones of the genre without ever establishing its own identity". USA Today gave the film three out of four stars and wrote, "What we're left with is solid if not exceptional, though it's good to see Mendes expanding as a filmmaker". TIME magazine's Richard Schickel wrote, "But the best war movies—and this one, despite its being overlong and repetitive, is among them—hold that men fight (or in this case, are ready to fight) not for causes, but to survive and to help their comrades do the same".

However, in his review for The New York Times, A. O. Scott felt that the film was "full of intensity with almost no real visceral impact", and called it "a minor movie about a minor war, and a film that feels, at the moment, remarkably irrelevant". Kenneth Turan in his review for the Los Angeles Times wrote:

Its polished surfaces and professional style can't compete with the gritty reality conveyed by documentaries like Gunner Palace and Occupation: Dreamland – or, for that matter, by the surreal black comedy of David O. Russell's Three Kings – that show in no uncertain terms what it's like to be a soldier in Iraq.

In his review for the Village Voice, J. Hoberman wrote, "A master of the monotone, Mendes prompts his performers to hit a note and sustain it. Although Jarhead is more visually accomplished and less empty than American Beauty or Road to Perdition, it still feels oppressively hermetic".

Nathaniel Fick, another author who is a Marine, gave the film a mixed review (and panned the book on which it is based) in Slate. He wrote, "Jarhead also presents wild scenes that probably could happen in combat units, but strips them of the context that might explain how they're more than sheer lunacy"; he later claims the filmmakers still "get much of the big stuff right". James Meek, who reported from the battlefields of Iraq, wrote in The Guardian: "The key to a film about war is how it ends, and if the young man at the film's centre is lifted out of the battlefield uninjured and sane, if his family and home life before and after aren't prominent in the picture, the movie is diminished as a film which says something about war and becomes a simpler story of growing up, of jeopardy overcome".

=== Accolades ===
Year	Ceremony	Category	Recipients	Result
2005	10th Satellite Awards	Best Actor - Drama	Jake Gyllenhaal	Nominated
2005	10th Satellite Awards	Best Supporting Actor – Drama	Peter Sarsgaard	Nominated
2005	10th Satellite Awards	Best Screenplay – Adapted	William Broyles Jr.	Nominated
2005	10th Satellite Awards	Best Film Editing	Walter Murch	Nominated
2005	Washington D.C. Area Film Critics Association Awards 2005	Best Supporting Actor	Peter Sarsgaard	Nominated

== Controversy ==
In a November 2005 New York Times article, David Carr noted that war veteran and writer Joel Turnipseed felt that parts of the film's plot had been taken from his 2002 book Baghdad Express: A Gulf War Memoir without his consent. Jarhead screenwriter William Broyles Jr. said many similarities arise from the retelling of common Marine experiences.

Department of Defense rejected the script, because it "did not meet D.O.D. requirements".

== Sequels ==
The film was followed by three direct-to-video sequels: Jarhead 2: Field of Fire (2014), Jarhead 3: The Siege (2016) and Jarhead: Law of Return (2019). All three sequels are fictional and unrelated to the original film.
