= Hill 55 =

Hill in central Vietnam

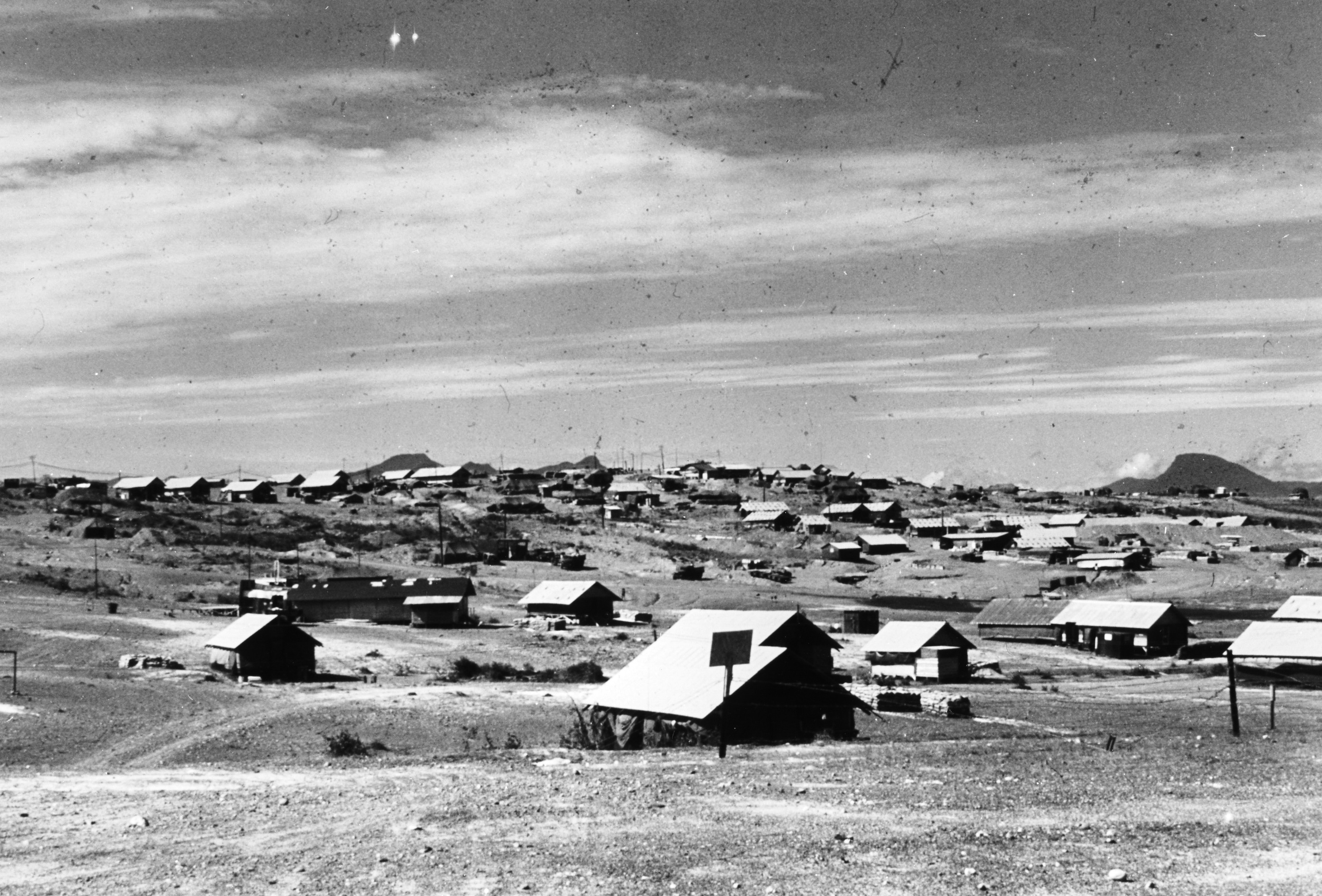
- Hill 55 in December 1967

Site information
- Type: Marines
- Condition: abandoned

Location
- Coordinates: 15°55′15.73″N 108°9′23″E

Site history
- Built: 1966
- In use: 1966–1971
- Battles/wars: Vietnam War

Garrison information
- Occupants: 3rd Marine Division; 1st Marine Division; ARVN 1st Division

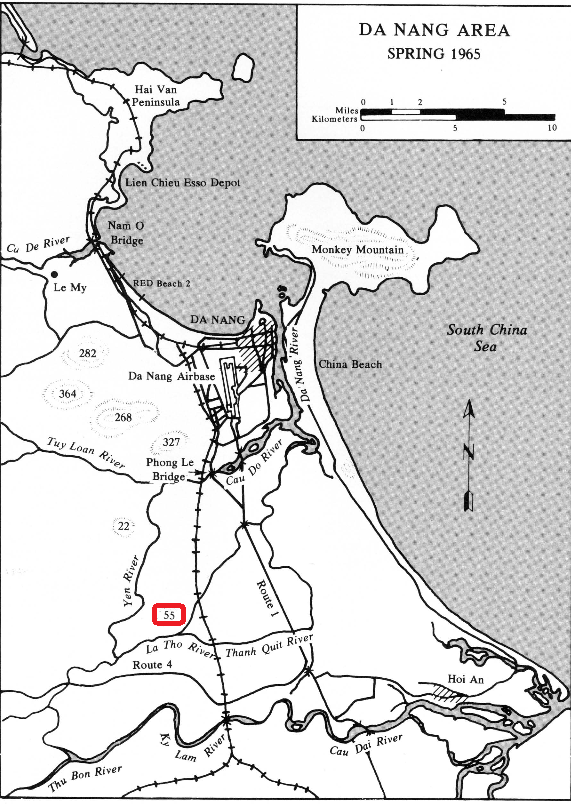
The Da Nang area, with Hill 55 indicated in red

Hill 55 (also known as Nui Dat Son or Camp Muir) is a hill 16 kilometres (9.9 mi) southwest of Da Nang, Quảng Nam Province, Vietnam. The hill is located 3 kilometres (1.9 mi) northeast of the confluence of the Yen, Ai Nghia, and La Tho Rivers and was a United States Marine Corps base during the Vietnam War.

== History ==
In the First Indochina War, two battalions of the French forces were wiped out on Hill 55.

In early 1966, Hill 55 was the dominant terrain feature in the area of responsibility of the 9th Marine Regiment. It had to be occupied to allow the Marines to continue operations against the Viet Cong. The hill was secured in late January, 1966. The hill had been extensively mined by the VC, necessitating a mine clearing operation by tracked vehicles of the 1st Amphibian Tractor Battalion. Engineers from the 3rd Combat Engineer Battalion constructed a command post. Most of this clearing work was completed by the end of February 1966. On March 29, engineers began construction of a regimental command post for the 9th Marines.

The base was named Camp Muir after Marine Lieutenant Colonel Joseph Muir, commanding officer of the 3rd Battalion, 3rd Marines who was killed on the hill by a booby-trap on 11 September 1965.

In September 1966 the Marines created an Assault Fire Unit consisting of 15 HAWK antiaircraft missiles from the 1st Light Antiaircraft Missile Battalion which deployed to Hill 55. The HAWK air defense was a mobile, surface-to-air guided missile system designed to defend the Da Nang Air Base against attack by North Vietnamese aircraft.

Marine Captain Edward James Land started a Scout/Sniper school on the hill in 1966. Notable Marine sniper Carlos Hathcock was stationed with the 1st Marine Division Scout Sniper Platoon on Hill 55.

By the beginning of 1968, control of Hill 55 had passed to the 7th Marine Regiment. On 31 January 1968, during the Tet Offensive, Communist troops bombarded Hill 55 with mortars. Marine casualties were light. During the night of 5–6 February, enemy gunners fired 122mm rockets at the base, resulting in little damage.

In August 1969, the 26th Marine Regiment established their command post at Camp Muir, replacing the 7th Marines. In July 1969, the antiaircraft missile unit with its HAWK missiles ceased operations in preparation for redeployment to Camp Pendleton, California. Marine artillery at Hill 55 in 1969 included batteries from 4th Battalion, 11th Marines. The 1st Battalion, 11th Marines had its command post on the hill.

1970 began a period of redeployment for U. S. Marines from South Vietnam. In early 1970, the 1st Marine Regiment was in control of the area around Hill 55. In March 1970, the 1st Marines transferred responsibility for the security of Hill 55 to the Army of the Republic of Vietnam (ARVN) 51st Regiment. Combat operations by Marine, U.S. Army, ARVN, and South Korean soldiers against Communist forces in the area continued into 1971.
