= Christa Parravani =

American author and assistant professor

- Born: Albany, New York, U.S.
- Education: Columbia University and Rutgers
- Occupations: Writer, professor, photographer
- Spouse: Anthony Swofford
- Writing career
- Period: 2013–present
- Genre: Memoir
- Website: christaparravani.com

Christa Parravani is an author and assistant professor in creative non-fiction at West Virginia University. Her first book focuses on the death of her twin sister, Cara. Her second memoir revolves around the limited reproductive options in West Virginia and the flaws in the healthcare system in the state.

== Life ==
Parravani taught at the University of Massachusetts Amherst, Greenfield Community College, Westfield State University and Keene State University in Keene, New Hampshire.

Parravani received her Bachelor's Degree from Bard College in 1999, graduating with a focus on literature and photography. She would go on to receive her first MFA in Visual Arts in 2003 from Columbia University. She received her second MFA in creative writing from Rutgers University in 2011.

She is married to Anthony Swofford.

== Writing ==
Her first memoir Her was published in 2013. Her second memoir Loved and Wanted: A Memoir of Choice, Children, and Womanhood was published by Henry Holt & Company in October 2020.

Parravani has appeared in Guernica, Catapult, Vogue, The Millions, Salon, The Rumpus, The Daily Beast, The Washington Post, and The Los Angeles Times. She has appeared on NPR and PBS.

== Awards ==
- Residency Fellowship, Corporation of Yaddo
- Residency Fellowship, Dora Maar House, Brown Fellows Foundation
- Residency Fellowship, MacDowell
- Amazon Spotlight Debut of the month, March 2013
- Indiebound Next Pick, March 2013
- Salon Best book of 2013
- Wall Street Journal best book of 2013
- Library Journal best book of 2013
- An Oprah, People, and NPR must read book of 2013
- Huffington Post best book of the last 5 years for women, 2015
- Finalist for Books for a Better Life Award, 2013
- Residency Fellowship, Byrdcliffe Center for the Arts
- Mortimer Frank Travel Fellowship, Columbia University

== Photography ==
Parravani completed an MFA in photography from Rutgers University and is represented by Foley Gallery in New York.
