= Charles W. Henderson =

American military writer (born 1948)

- Born: August 26, 1948 (age 78); Artesia, New Mexico, US
- Education: Syracuse University, Pennsylvania State University
- Occupation: Writer
- Writing career
- Genre: Military
- Notable works: Marine Sniper, Goodnight Saigon
- Notable awards: American Society of Journalists and Authors
- Website: charleshenderson.net/index.htm

Charles William Henderson (born August 26, 1948) is a retired Marine Corps Warrant Officer and an author based in Colorado. Henderson is best known for his two biographies, Marine Sniper: 93 Confirmed Kills and Silent Warrior, about Marine Corps Sniper Carlos Hathcock.

== Biography ==
Henderson was born in Artesia, New Mexico, on August 26, 1948, and attended Artesia High School, graduating in 1966. From 1968 to 1970, he was a reporter and sports editor for the Artesia Daily Press. In May 1970, he enlisted in the United States Marine Corps as an Infantryman. He served in Vietnam and Beirut, Lebanon. He went on to serve in Public Affairs positions and as a journalist for the military. He retired from the Marine Corps in 1993 as a Chief Warrant Officer. In 1997, he accepted a position with the National Livestock Producers Association as Director of Commodities and Communications, retiring in 1999 to become a full-time writer.

== Works ==
- Marine Sniper: 93 Confirmed Kills, (1986); reissued as a paperback in 1988 ISBN 0-425-10355-2 OCLC 45427612
- Marshalling the Faithful: The Marines' First Year in Vietnam, (1993) ISBN 0-425-13957-3 OCLC 29640604
- Silent Warrior, (Berkley Books, 2000) ISBN 0-425-17660-6 OCLC 44518255
- Goodnight Saigon, (2005) ISBN 0-425-18846-9 OCLC 56526723
- Jungle Rules: A True Story of Marine Justice in Vietnam, (2007) ISBN 0-425-21186-X

== Awards and honors ==
- Life Member of Phi Kappa Phi Honor Society
- The American Society of Journalists and Authors named Goodnight Saigon, as the Outstanding General Nonfiction Book for 2006.
