= Edward James Land =

American military sniper

- Born: June 4, 1935 (age 91); Lincoln, Nebraska, U.S.
- Military career
- Allegiance: United States of America
- Branch: United States Marine Corps
- Service years: 1953–1977
- Rank: Major
- Nicknames: Jim, EJ
- Unit: 1st Marine Division
- Conflicts: Vietnam War
- Awards: Legion of Merit
- Other work: NRA Secretary (1994–2015)

Edward James Land Jr. or Jim Land (born June 4, 1935) is a retired Marine Corps officer who was instrumental in starting the Marine Scout Sniper program.

== United States Marine Corps ==
Edward James Land, Jr. was born on June 4, 1935 in Lincoln, Nebraska.

He enlisted in the Marine Corps at age 17 in 1953. Land went on to become a Staff Sergeant and a Drill Instructor before attending Officer Candidate School (OCS) in 1959. Upon graduating OCS, Land was commissioned as a Second Lieutenant in the 4th Marine Regiment. As an officer, Land demonstrated an aptitude for competitive shooting and was selected for the Marine Corps Rifle Team.

In 1961, Land founded the first modern sniper course for the Marine Corps.

In Vietnam, Land was the commanding officer of Carlos Hathcock, whom he had trained in one of his early Sniper Courses.

Land was assigned as Commanding Officer of the Marine Security Guard detachment at the U.S. Embassy in Saigon, Vietnam in November 1971. He was awarded the Legion of Merit for his service at the Embassy under Ambassador Ellsworth Bunker.

After the Vietnam War, Land along with Major Richard O. Culver Jr. established the first permanent Marine Corps Scout Sniper school in Quantico, Virginia.

After Vietnam, Land served as the Marine Corps Marksmanship coordinator.

== Community life ==
Land was active in the community, and from 1977 until 1980, held the position of scoutmaster for Boy Scout Troop 1183 in Triangle, Virginia. During his tenure he mentored many Scouts, several to the rank of Eagle. He was also instrumental in spearheading a newspaper recycling program, years before such recycling practices were commonplace. Newspaper from the local community was collected once a month by the Scouts and sold to an insulation company, with the proceeds to benefit the scout troop. From September 16 through 29, 1978, funds from these efforts sent 12 Scouts and 3 leaders to Brownsea Island, England, the location of Lord Baden Powell's first Boy Scout camping trip in 1907.

== After military service ==
Land retired from the Marine Corps as a major in 1977.

Land was elected as Secretary of the National Rifle Association of America in 1994. He retired from this position in April 2015.

== See also ==
- United States Marine Corps Scout Sniper
- Richard O. Culver Jr. - worked with Land in establishing the first Scout Sniper School.
- Carlos Hathcock - famed Marine Corps sniper.
