= Roy F. Chandler =

American author

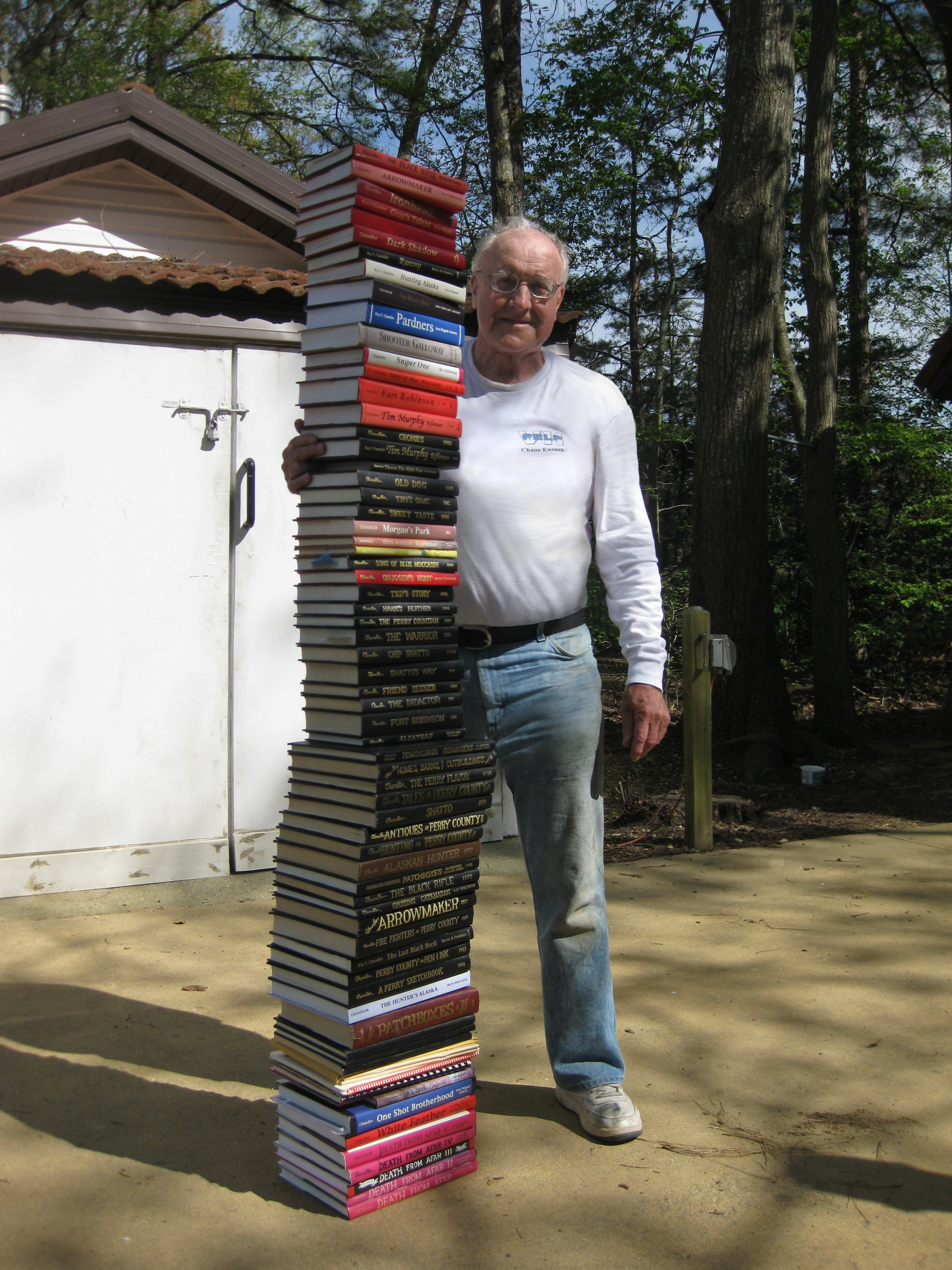
- Chandler in 2009 with his books.
- Born: Roy Freeman Chandler; December 17, 1925; Brockton, Massachusetts, U.S.
- Died: December 24, 2015 (aged 90); Callaway, Maryland, U.S.
- Education: Carson Long Military Academy; BS, Pennsylvania State University
- Occupations: Soldier, teacher, author
- Spouse(s): Katherine R. Chandler, PHD
- Writing career
- Period: 1969 - 2010

Roy F. Chandler (December 17, 1925 - December 24, 2015) was the author of more than sixty published books and many magazine articles. He is known for his series of sniper related books, including the series "Death From Afar".

== Biography ==
Chandler was a United States Army veteran with more than twenty years of active service including World War II and Korea. Later, he was a schoolteacher in Pennsylvania and Alaska. His writing is often based on personal experiences. He was a full-time author for more than thirty years. Chandler died of cancer on December 24, 2015.

== Bibliography ==
=== Perry County, Pennsylvania, series ===
Limited edition copies, where known.

- History of Early Perry County Guns and Gunsmiths, 1969
- A History of Perry County Railroads, 1970
- Tales of Perry County, 1973
- A History of Hunting in Perry County, 1974
- Arrowmaker, 1974
- Antiques of Perry County, 1976
- The Black Rifle, 1976
- Homes, Barns and Outbuildings of Perry County, 1978
- Shatto, 1979
- The Perry County Flavor, 1980
- The Didactor, 1981 (900)
- Fort Robinson: A novel of Perry County Pennsylvania, the years 1750–63, 1981 (800)
- Friend Seeker: A novel of Perry County PA, 1982 (900)
- Perry County in Pen & Ink, 1983
- Shatto's way: A novel of Perry County, Pa, 1984 (1000)
- Chip Shatto: A novel of Perry County Pennsylvania, the years 1863–65, 1984
- Firefighters of Perry County, 1982
- Perry County Sketchbook, 1986
- The Warrior, A novel of Perry County Pennsylvania, 1995 (1500)
- The Perry Countian, 1987
- Hawk's Feather – An Adventure Story, 1988
- Ted's Story, 1988 (1000)
- Cronies, 1989
- Song of Blue Moccasin, 1989
- The Sweet Taste, 1990 (1000)
- Tiff's Game: A work of fiction, 1991
- Old Dog, 1993
- Tim Murphy, Rifleman: A novel of Perry County, Pa, 1754–1840, 1993
- Ramsey: A novel of Perry County Pennsylvania, 1994
- Last Black Book, 1995
- Ironhawk, 1999

=== The Gun of Joseph Smith series (young adult) ===
- The Gun of Joseph Smith, (with Katherine R. Chandler), 1987
- Tuck Morgan, Plainsman (Vol. 2) (with Katherine R. Chandler), 1991
- Morgan's Park (Vol. 3) (with Katherine R. Chandler), 1997

=== Death From Afar series ===
- Death From Afar I (and Norman A. Chandler), 1992
- Death From Afar II: Marine Corps Sniping (and Norman A. Chandler), 1993
- Death From Afar Vol. III: The Black Book (and Norman A. Chandler), 1994
- Death From Afar IV (and Norman A. Chandler), 1996
- Death From Afar V (and Norman A. Chandler), 1998

=== Other fiction ===
- Chugger's Hunt, 1990
- Gray's Talent, 1995
- Dark shadow, 1996
- Sniper One (Iron Brigade series), 2000
- Shooter Galloway', 2004
- The Boss's Boy, 2007
- Pardners, 2008
- The Saga of Hawk's Revenge, 2010
- The Making of Blackwater Jack, 2014 (ISBN 9781500373023)

=== Other non-fiction ===
( )Limited edition copies, where known.

- Alaskan hunter: a book about big game hunting, 1972
- Kentucky Rifle Patchboxes and Barrel Marks, 1972 (400)
- Arms Makers of Eastern Pennsylvania, 1981 (1000)
- Gunsmiths of Eastern Pennsylvania, 1982
- Pennsylvania Gunmakers (a collection), 1984
- A 30', $6,000 Cruising Catamaran, 1987
- Alcatraz: The Hard Years 1934–1938, (with Erville F. Chandler), 1989
- Kentucky Rifle Patchboxes All New Volume 2, 1992
- Behold the Long Rifle, 1993
- The Kentucky Pistol, 1994 (1800)
- Choose the Right Gun, 1994 (2000)
- Hunting Alaska, 1995
- The Hunter's Alaska, 2005
- White Feather: Carlos Hathcock USMC scout sniper (and Norman A. Chandler), 1997
- One Shot Brotherhood (and Norman A. Chandler), 2001

=== Children’s books ===
- All About a Foot Soldier, 1965
- Oog The Baker, 2006

== Perry County frontier series reading order according to The Last Black Book ==
1. Friend Seeker
2. The Warrior (1721–1764)
3. Arrowmaker
4. The Black Rifle
5. Fort Robinson (1750–63)
6. Ironhawk
7. Song of Blue Moccasin
8. Tim Murphy, Rifleman (1754–1840)
9. Hawk's Feather
10. Shatto
11. Chip Shatto (1863–65)
12. Ted's Story
13. Tiff's Game
14. Cronies
15. The Didactor
16. The Perry Countian
17. The Sweet Taste
18. Old Dog
19. Ramsey
20. Shatto's Way
