= Adelbert Waldron =

American decorated sniper (1933–1995)

Adelbert Francis Waldron III
- Born: March 14, 1933; Syracuse, New York, U.S.
- Died: October 18, 1995 (aged 62); Riverside, California, U.S.
- Burial place: Riverside National Cemetery, Riverside, California, U.S.
- Military career
- Allegiance: United States of America
- Branch: United States Navy; United States Army
- Service years: 1953–1965 (U.S. Navy); 1968–1970 (U.S. Army)
- Rank: Staff sergeant
- Nickname: "Bert"
- Units: 9th Infantry Division, United States Army Marksmanship Unit
- Conflicts: Vietnam War
- Awards: Distinguished Service Cross (2); Silver Star; Bronze Star (3); Presidential Unit Citation

Adelbert Francis "Bert" Waldron III (March 14, 1933 – October 18, 1995) was a United States Army sniper who served during the Vietnam War with the 9th Infantry Division. He had the most kills of any American sniper in the Vietnam War. Until 2011, Waldron held the record for most confirmed kills by any American sniper (109 confirmed kills).

== Early life ==
Adelbert was born March 14, 1933, to Adelbert Francis Waldron Jr. (1910–1966), a parking lot operator, detective agency employee, fireman and school bus driver, and Virginia M. Searle (1914–1979), in Syracuse. He had two sisters.

== Career ==
Prior to his time in the Army, Waldron spent 12 years in the US Navy. As a member of the 9th Infantry Division, he was assigned to PBR boats patrolling the Mekong Delta, at one point making a confirmed kill from a moving boat at 900 yards. He set his record of 109 kills in just eight months. After leaving Vietnam he was assigned as a marksmanship instructor at Ft. Benning, GA but left the Army in 1970.

Waldron was one of the few two-time recipients of the Distinguished Service Cross, both awarded for separate actions in 1969. In addition to these he was awarded a Silver Star, multiple Bronze Stars, and a Presidential Unit Citation.

Waldron is buried in Riverside National Cemetery in Riverside, California.

== Bibliography ==
- Fredriksen, John C. (2010). The United States Army: A Chronology, 1775 to the Present (2010 ed.). ABC-CLIO. ISBN 978-1-59884-344-6.
- Kirchner, Paul (2009). More of the Deadliest Men Who Ever Lived (2009 ed.). Paladin Press. ISBN 978-1-58160-690-4.
- "Little Known Sniper" (website) accessed 18 August 2010 http://council.smallwarsjournal.com/archive/index.php/t-2178.html
