= Eric England (sniper) =

American sniper

Eric R. England
- Born: 15 April 1933; Union County, Georgia, U.S.
- Died: 7 April 2018 (aged 84) Decatur, Georgia, U.S.
- Allegiance: United States of America
- Branch: United States Marine Corps
- Service years: 1950–1992
- Rank: Master sergeant
- Conflicts: Vietnam War

Master Sergeant Eric Roy England (April 15, 1933 – April 7, 2018) was a sniper for the United States Marine Corps 3rd Marine Division during the Vietnam War. He had 98 confirmed kills, and many more unconfirmed. Joining the U.S. Marine Corps (USMC) in 1950, England was a Nationals rifle shooting champion by age 19 in 1952, and a long-range champion by 1968. He received his first competitive training in USMC bootcamp from his cousin James Harry Turner, at that time a Marine weapons instructor. This led to a 24-year career on the USMC rifle team, winning national and international competitions as participant and coach.

Although little-known outside of sniper circles, England was highly respected, and was the subject of the book Phantom of Phu Bai, written by J. B. Turner. A sculpture in England's honor was erected at the county courthouse in Union County, Georgia, in 2006. Guest speakers included former Governor of Georgia and U.S. Senator Zell Miller, a Marine, and a cousin of England; and Maj. Edward James Land, USMC, (ret.), Carlos Hathcock's commanding officer and occasional fellow sniper in Vietnam.

England married Glenda Sue Berrong of Blairsville, Georgia, in 1979, and they remained married until his death. He died at the V.A. Hospital in Decatur, Georgia on April 7, 2018, at the age of 84. He was survived by his son Howard Beck, and three grandchildren.
