= United States Marine Corps Scout Sniper =

Occupational field and specialty within the USMC

United States Marine Corps Scout Snipers
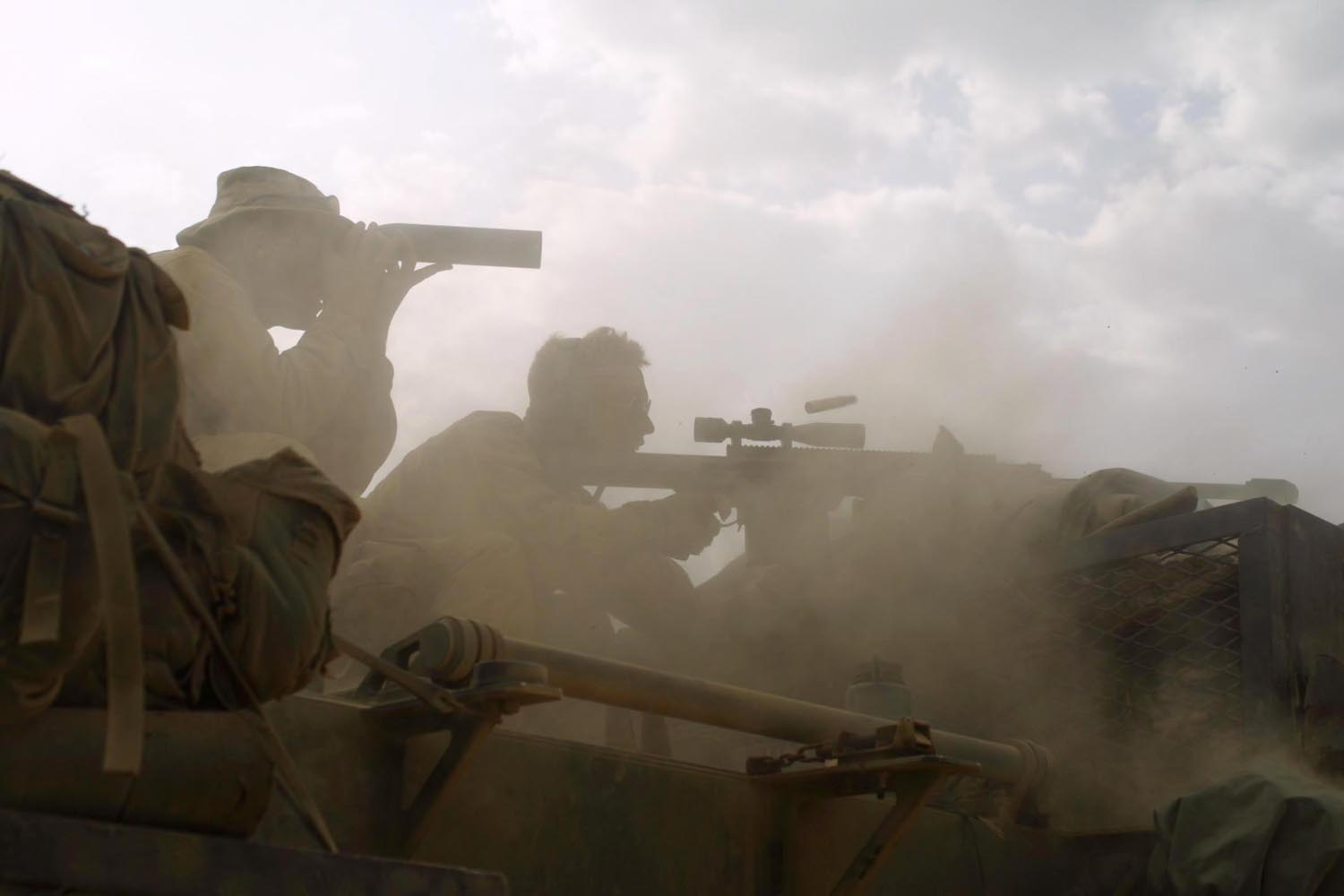
- Scout Snipers from the 26th Marine Expeditionary Unit (Special Operations Capable) in Djibouti, circa 2003
- Active: 1943–December 15, 2023
- Country: United States
- Branch: United States Marine Corps
- Type: Reconnaissance scout/sniper
- Role: Close-quarters combat Direct support of infantry and reconnaissance units Reconnaissance; Special operations
- Size: Platoon (8–10 men)
- Engagements: World War II; Pacific War; Iraq War; War in Afghanistan

United States Marine Corps Scout Sniper (MOS 0317, formerly 8541) was a secondary MOS (Military Occupational Specialty) designator of U.S. Marine Corps infantrymen and reconnaissance Marines that have graduated from a U.S. Marine Corps Scout Sniper School. Scout Snipers were required to earn the rank of Lance Corporal, be selected by their battalion to join the scout-sniper platoon, and complete an approved scout-sniper course in order to receive this designation. As of December 2023, Marine scout snipers (0317 MOS) have been reorganized as MOS 0322 Reconnaissance Sniper Marines, as part of a 26-Marine Scout Platoon.

== History ==
A USMC Scout Sniper was a marine infantryman highly skilled in fieldcraft and marksmanship, who can deliver long-range precision fire on high-value targets from concealed positions in support of combat operations. The first Scout Snipers were trained near San Diego, California in 1943 and saw combat in the Pacific Theater of Operations during World War II.

A USMC Scout Sniper Team was a detachment of one or more sniper teams performing an assigned task of engaging selected targets, targets of opportunity, collecting and reporting information, or a combination of all, contributing to the accomplishment of the supported unit's mission.

Surveillance and Target Acquisition (STA) Platoons, very similar units, existed until shortly after the Gulf War. They consisted of Scout Snipers and Intelligence Marines.

A Scout Sniper platoon was composed of 8–10 Scout Sniper teams, some of which are specially suited for night operations and fully capable of operating in almost complete darkness through use of night vision scopes and infrared laser equipment. Typically, each Scout Sniper team has two members: one is the actual shooter, equipped with a long-range, specially-made sniper rifle, such as the M40, and also frequently issued an M9 9mm pistol as a defensive side arm; the other is the spotter, typically armed with an M4 carbine and uses a high-power spotting scope to spot targets and provide ballistic information for the shooter. The shooter/spotter relationship was not always set; some platoons established designated shooters, while others have team members taking turns doing the shooting/spotting. Within a platoon, there were four anti-materiel rifles chambered in .50 BMG designated the Special Application Scoped Rifle (SASR), such as the M82 or M107. These can be issued to a team as needed to give supported commanders the option of taking out heavy equipment or lightly armored vehicles. Scout Sniper teams trained to engage man-sized targets with the M40 out to 1,000 yards (3,000 ft), and can be effective at a range of up to 1.25 mi (2.01 km) with the M82, if the environment is right.

=== Controversial use of the "SS" symbol ===
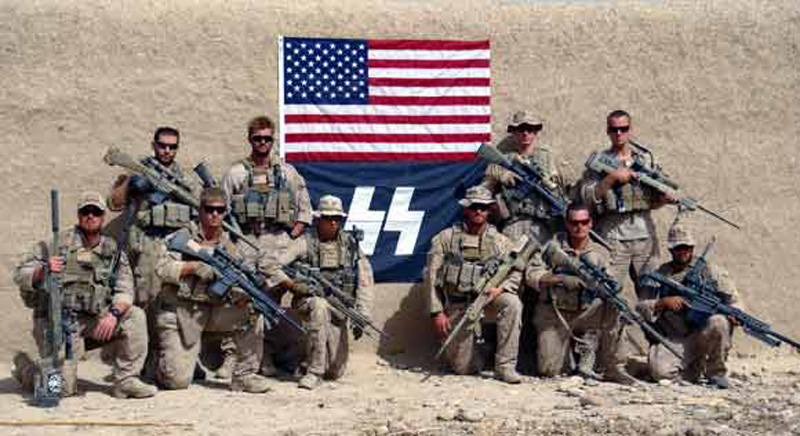
This image's publication, showing Scout Snipers posing with an flag in Afghanistan in 2010, triggered the controversy about the Scout Snipers' use of the symbol.

In February 2012, U.S. media reported that Marine scout snipers had been using the double Sig rune (ᛋᛋ, "SS") in its "Armanen" form to symbolize their function since at least the 1980s. The same stylized double rune was the symbol of the SS, the Nazi organization that was instrumental in conducting the Holocaust. Strong media criticism of this practice ensued. The Commandant of the Marine Corps gave orders to stop it, issued an apology, and ordered an investigation into the prevalence of this practice.

A Marine official was quoted as saying that their leadership believed that the Marines did not understand the logo's significance. The Military Religious Freedom Foundation, which had helped circulate an image of snipers posing with a blue "SS" flag, questioned this assumption, writing that the flag was sold by a website dedicated to German World War II and Nazi memorabilia.

Despite the official prohibition, the New York Times reported in 2020 that the "SS" logo continues to be used by Marines, "much like a secret handshake".

=== End of service ===
With the implementation of Force Design 2030, Marine scout snipers have been replaced with MOS 0322 Reconnaissance Sniper Marines, as part of a 26-Marine Scout Platoon. The last 0317 class graduated December 15, 2023.

== Overview ==
A Marine Corps Scout Sniper was a Marine skilled in fieldcraft and marksmanship who delivers long range precision fire, on select targets, from concealed positions in support of combat operations.

- Support combat operations by delivering precision fire on selected targets.
- Establish concealed sniper/observation sites from which targets are analyzed, engaged, and information gathered.
- Use map and compass for day or night land navigation.
- Operate and maintain weapons and optical equipment employed by the Scout Sniper

Scout Snipers provided close reconnaissance and surveillance to the infantry battalion. By doctrine, a Scout Sniper was a Marine highly skilled in field craft and marksmanship who delivers long range precision fire on selected targets from concealed positions in support of combat operations.

Scout Snipers in Marine infantry battalions fell under the Surveillance and Target Acquisition (STA) units initially, and subsequently to the infantry battalion's Scout Sniper Platoon (SSP), usually within the Headquarters and Service (H&S) Company or Weapons Company. Marine Scout Snipers were trained at one of the four school house locations.

The term "Scout Sniper" is only used officially by the Marine Corps, but it does not imply a differing mission from the U.S. Army Sniper. An Army Sniper's primary mission is to support combat operations by delivering precise long-range fire on selected targets. By this, the sniper creates casualties among enemy troops, slows enemy movement, frightens enemy soldiers, lowers morale, and adds confusion to their operations. The sniper's secondary mission is collecting and reporting battlefield information, Section 1.1 FM 23-10 Sniper Training.

The Marine Corps is unique in its consolidation of reconnaissance and sniper duties for a single Marine. Most other conventional armed forces, including the U.S. Army, separate the reconnaissance soldier or scout from the sniper. In the U.S. Army, the 19D MOS, "Cavalry Scout" is the primary special reconnaissance and surveillance soldier and the term "Infantry Scout" refers to a specially trained infantrymen that functions in a reconnaissance and surveillance capacity, while "Sniper" refers to a specially selected and trained soldier that primarily functions as a sniper. Most military forces believe that the separation of reconnaissance and sniper capabilities allows for a higher degree of specialization.

== Scout Sniper Course ==
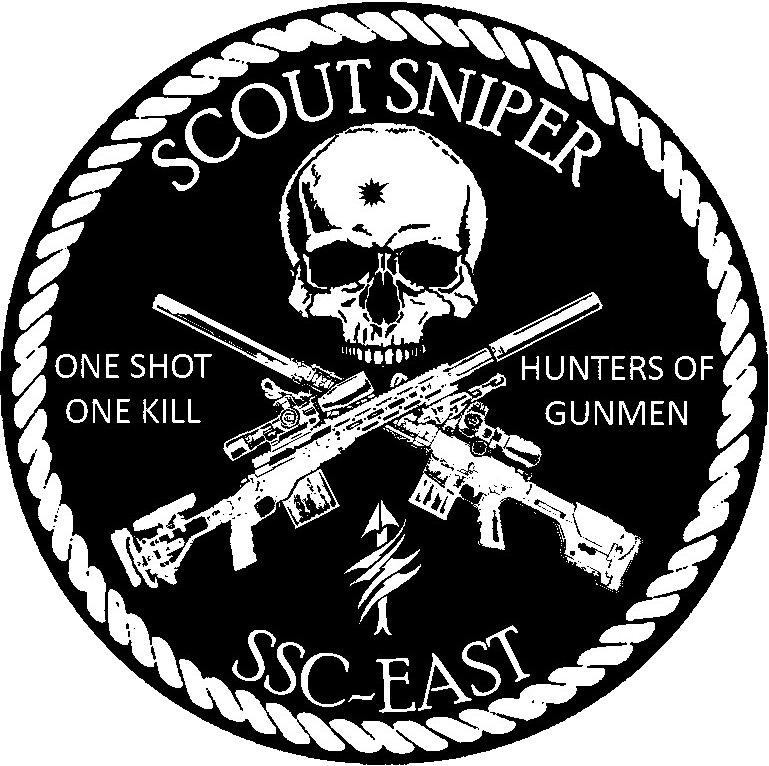
U.S. Marine Corps Scout Sniper Course-East (SSC-East) logo

The Marine Scout Sniper Course qualified students as Marine Corps Scout Snipers. The graduation rate in 2017 was 44 percent. There were three different school houses in the Marine Corps that offer the Scout Sniper Course.

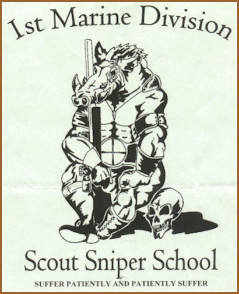
Camp Pendleton Sniper School

- School of Infantry (West), Marine Corps Base Camp Pendleton, California
- Marine Corps Base Camp Lejeune, North Carolina
- Marine Corps Base Quantico, Virginia

In 2009, a major change in curriculum occurred with the Scout Sniper Basic Course and it was shortened from the traditional 10-week course to an 8 1/2 week course. This was done concurrently with the removal of the Advanced Course and the addition of the Team Leader Course of four weeks. This reduction of 1 1/2 weeks is because of the removal of the course's mission planning phase and the addition of this curriculum to the Team Leader Course. Missions are still conducted during the course's last week, but are now not a major part of curriculum.

In 2010, a new curriculum was introduced, with shooting as the course's primary focus and stalking a secondary focus. The new course was now 12 1/2 weeks long. With elimination of the advanced course, Scout Sniper Basic Course was re-designated as the "Scout Sniper Course". There were nine straight weeks of shooting qualifications, before the majority of field training.

== Other schools ==
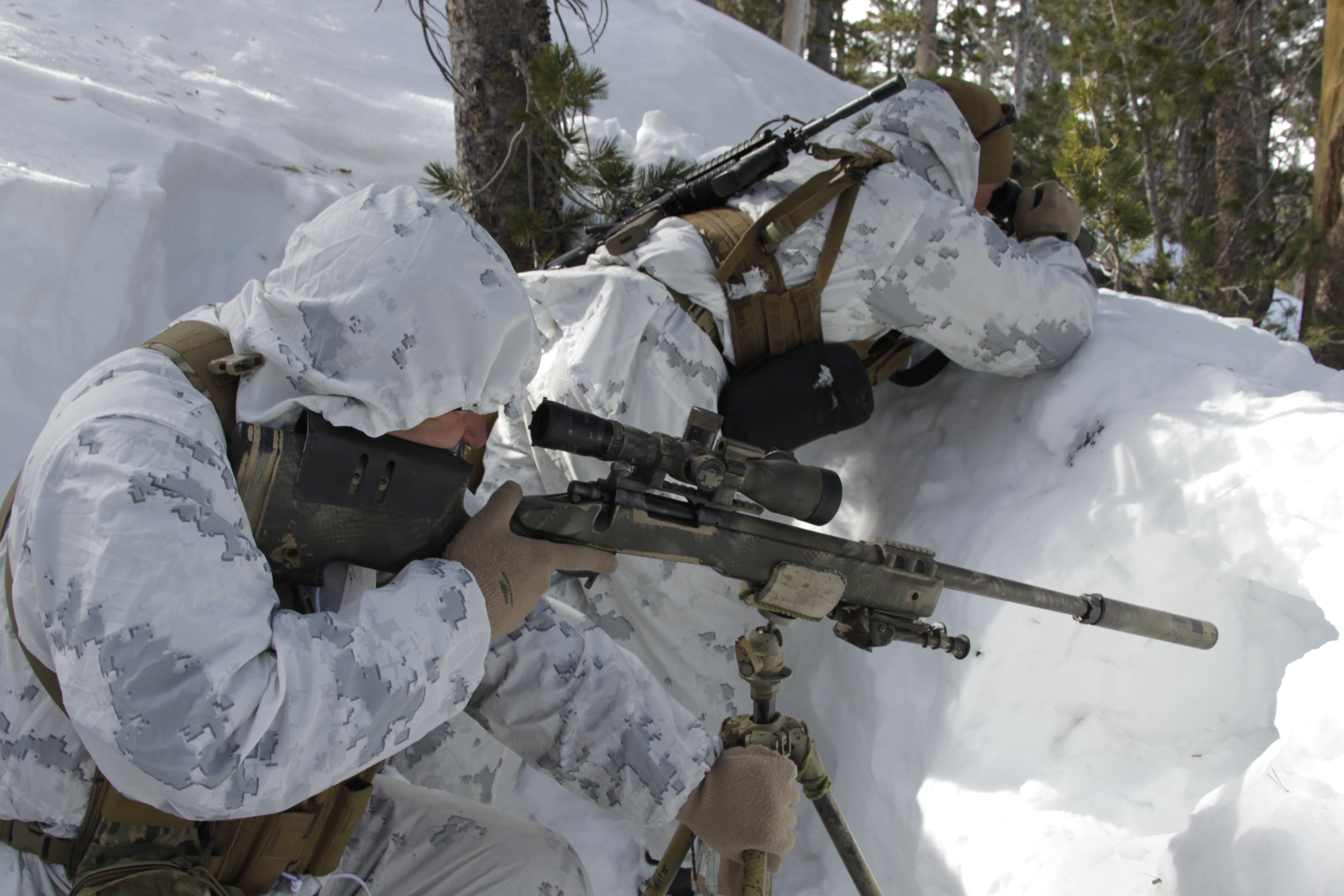
Snipers train at the Mountain Warfare Training Center

After graduating the basic course, Marines were given the opportunity to obtain a variety of other courses to further refine their skills.

- Urban Snipers
- High Angle (Mountain) Snipers
- Scout Snipers Team leader course (formerly the advanced course)
- Foreign Forces Snipers Schools
  - British Royal Marine Snipers School
  - Israeli Foreign Forces Snipers School

== Notable Scout Snipers ==
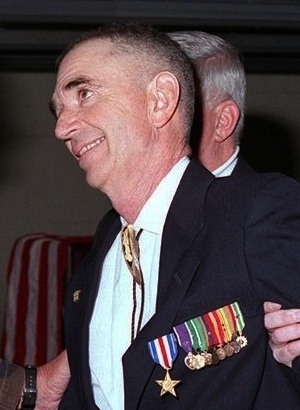
Carlos Hathcock in 1996. During the Vietnam War he had 93 confirmed kills, 300–400 estimated kills, and until 2002, had the longest recorded shot made by a U.S. Marine Corps Scout Sniper.

- Carlos Hathcock, during the Vietnam War had 93 confirmed kills, 300–400 estimated kills, and until 2002, had the longest recorded shot made by a Scout Sniper.
- Chuck Mawhinney, USMC Scout/Sniper during Vietnam War, credited with 103 confirmed kills and 216+ probable kills during 16 months in Vietnam.
- Lee Marvin, scout-sniper during World War II and Purple Heart recipient. After war, actor and Academy Award winner.
- Dakota Meyer, a Medal of Honor recipient, was a scout-sniper working with Embedded Training Team 2-8 for actions during Battle of Ganjgal of the War in Afghanistan.
- Eric England, also known as The Phantom of Phu Bai, was a sniper during the Vietnam War. 98 confirmed kills in 7 months; wounded by mortar. Returned to Vietnam, making as many as 200 additional unconfirmed enemy kills.

== See also ==
- United States Army Sniper School
- Marksmanship badges (United States)
- Intelligence, surveillance, target acquisition, and reconnaissance

Related military roles

- Designated marksman
- Jäger (military)
- Marksman
- Scout
- Skirmisher
- Sniper

Related military operations

- Operation Foxley – plan to kill Adolf Hitler using a sniper
- Sniper Alley
- Snipers of the Soviet Union
- Special forces

Related military weapons

- Anti-materiel rifle
- Anti-tank rifle
- Sniper rifle
