= The Bang-Bang Club =

The Bang-Bang Club may refer to:

- Bang-Bang Club, a name of 4 photographers in townships of South Africa during the Apartheid period, particularly between 1990 and 1994
- The Bang-Bang Club (book), a 2000 book written by Greg Marinovich and João Silva about their experiences as part of the Bang-Bang Club
- The Bang Bang Club (film), a 2010 film adaptation of the same-titled book

== See also ==
- The Life of Kevin Carter: Casualty of the Bang Bang Club, a 2004 American documentary about Bang-Bang Club
