= The Bang Bang Club (film) =

- Theatrical release poster
- Directed by: Steven Silver
- Screenplay by: Steven Silver
- Story by: Greg Marinovich; João Silva
- Produced by: Adam Friedlander; Daniel Iron; Lance Samuels
- Starring: Taylor Kitsch; Ryan Phillippe; Frank Rautenbach; Neels Van Jaarsveld; Malin Åkerman; Patrick Lyster; Russel Savadier
- Cinematography: Miroslaw Baszak
- Edited by: Ronald Sanders; Tad Seaborn
- Music by: Philip Miller
- Distributed by: Entertainment One
- Release dates: 15 September 2010 (TIFF); 6 May 2011 (Canada)
- Running time: 106 minutes
- Countries: Canada; South Africa
- Languages: English; Zulu; Xhosa; Afrikaans
- Box office: $221,292

The Bang Bang Club is a 2010 Canadian-South African biographical drama film written and directed by Steven Silver and stars Ryan Phillippe as Greg Marinovich, Malin Åkerman as Robin Comley, Taylor Kitsch as Kevin Carter, Frank Rautenbach as Ken Oosterbroek and Neels Van Jaarsveld as João Silva. They portray the lives of four photojournalists active within the townships of apartheid-era South Africa in the early 1990s, from when Nelson Mandela was released from prison in 1990 to the 1994 general election.

It is a film adaptation of the book The Bang-Bang Club: Snapshots from a Hidden War co-written by Greg Marinovich and João Silva who were part of the group of four photographers known as the Bang-Bang Club, the other two members being Kevin Carter and Ken Oosterbroek.

== Plot ==
The film tells the story of four young men and the extremes they went to in order to capture their photographs of anti-apartheid protests and the resulting police brutality, while the State President, F.W. de Klerk made negotiations to end apartheid in South Africa.

== Cast ==
The Bang-Bang Club members

- Ryan Phillippe as Greg Marinovich
- Malin Åkerman as Robin Comley
- Taylor Kitsch as Kevin Carter
- Frank Rautenbach as Ken Oosterbroek
- Neels Van Jaarsveld as João Silva

Other roles

- Patrick Lyster as James Nachtwey
- Russel Savadier as Ronald Graham
- Alf Kumalo as himself

== Distribution ==
The film had its world premiere at the Toronto International Film Festival (TIFF). Entertainment One has distribution rights for Canada. Tribeca Film acquired American distribution rights. It was released theatrically in the United States on 22 April 2011. According to The Numbers, the film was only shown in nine theatres in the US where it earned $124,791.

== Reception ==
The Bang Bang Club received mixed reviews. As of December 2024, it holds a 49% rating on Rotten Tomatoes based on 49 reviews, with an average rating of 5.8/10.

Judith Matloff, a veteran foreign correspondent and contributing editor at Columbia Journalism Review said that the film was "the latest Hollywood production to get the role of the conflict correspondent wrong". Matloff wrote: "But the reporters and photographers stationed in South Africa at the time were also compassionate human beings who exposed themselves to danger because they wanted to record history. This doesn't particularly come through in the film. Instead, Silver plays to the Hollywood stereotype of journalists as heartless outsiders. After a fun day taking pictures of black people massacring each other, the lads go back to the white suburbs and party — the implication being that the bloodshed is a game to them." Matloff worked with Marinovich and knew Silva, as she was a member of the Johannesburg press corps in the early 1990s. She wrote that Marinovich had disassociated himself from the film version. "It has the same title but it is not the same story. It's not my life. I don't see the character as me."

In The Guardian, Miriam Brent said "Frustratingly, though, while the film poses pertinent questions about when to put the camera down, it shies away from delving deeper into these moral dilemmas and the emotional strain faced by combat photographers. Instead we're introduced to a testosterone-fuelled world in which dodging bullets is just another way of getting kicks before the partying starts. … It's just a shame the accomplished cinematography isn't matched by a script that lets the true bravery and accomplishments of combat photojournalists shine through, as they deserve."
