= The Bang-Bang Club (book) =

2000 nonfiction book

The Bang-Bang Club: Snapshots from a Hidden War
- Author: Greg Marinovich and Joao Silva
- Original title: The Bang Bang club
- Language: English
- Genre: Autobiography
- Published: 20 September 2000 Basic Books
- Publication place: South Africa
- Media type: Print (Hardback & Paperback)
- Pages: 300 pp. (Hardcover edition)
- ISBN: 0-465-04412-3 (Hardback); 0-465-04413-1 (Paperback)

The Bang-Bang Club: Snapshots from a Hidden War is a 2000 autobiographical styled text about the Bang-Bang Club, a group of four South African photographers active within the townships of South Africa during the apartheid period, particularly between 1990 and 1994. The journalists were Kevin Carter, Greg Marinovich, Ken Oosterbroek, and João Silva. The book was co-authored by two of the journalists, Marinovich and Silva.

== History ==
In the years between 1990 and 1994 the fight from herrenvolk democracy (apartheid) to multiracial democracy in South Africa was extremely violent. The stories painted a picture "of a group of hard-living men who worked, played and hung out together pretty much all of the time", how Greg Marinovich wrote in the preface of the book, however the book aimed to "Set the record straight: …". In 1997 Marinovich and Joao Silva started to write the book. In the acknowledgments were mentioned the many Impimpi – informants who contributed to the book. Impimpi is a Zulu word and in the glossary of the book it is translated as "spy". These 45 people, including the parents of Kevin Carter, helped Marinovich and Silva to write the book "straight". Judith Matloff, also listed under impimpi, wrote in an article: "But the reporters and photographers stationed in South Africa at the time were also compassionate human beings who exposed themselves to danger because they wanted to record history". Other witnesses or impimpi for the book from that era include: James Nachtwey, Peter Magubane, Brian Mkhize, Gilles Peress, Vivian Silva, and more.

The book was first published in January 2000 by William Heinemann, London, UK and then by Basic Books, New York. It was translated into Polish, Portuguese, Spanish and 2015 into German. It is published in 19 Editions.

== Book review ==
Niranjan Karnik wrote the review for H-SAfrica.

At the end of his review Niranjan Karnik wrote: "I have several concerns about the future of this profession". He expressed that conflict journalists need a "debriefing" after the experience of a conflict or war zone "akin to what the International Committee of the Red Cross requires of its fieldworkers". The usefulness of the book: "Its overall value is not as much in its use as source of history, but in how it openly exposes the way journalists suffer in the course of their work, and the heavy ethical and moral questions they face on a daily basis."

Karnik wrote that "Students of the media and aspiring journalists will find special value and significance in this book, for its unsparing and often graphic portrayal of events in South Africa."

The moral and ethical questions are central themes in the book. Karnik discuss the themes in the example of the noted photograph by Kevin Carter.

Carter, for example, won the 1994 Pulitzer Prize for a photograph of a starving child that he took in south sudan in 1993. The famous photograph shows a small, emaciated girl curled over in exhaustion while a vulture sits a short distance away on the ground next to her. The photograph became the cover image for many humanitarian groups in their fundraising appeals. It also raised ethical questions about the limits that journalists will go to get an image.

Karnik explains that the book "lacks the academic and critical analysis", which he is used to write as an author and which he reads in his profession. But nevertheless he wrote that the book: "as a perspective into the dynamics of wartime reporting it is valuable".

== Film adaptation ==
In 2010, the Canadian director Steven Silver released a film adaptation of the book as a full-feature film also entitled The Bang Bang Club.
