= Kevin Carter =

South African photojournalist (1960–1994)

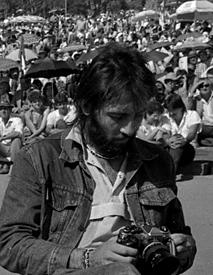
- Undated portrait of Carter
- Born: 13 September 1960; Johannesburg, South Africa
- Died: 27 July 1994 (aged 33); Parkmore, Johannesburg, South Africa
- Occupation: Photojournalist
- Notable work: The Vulture and the Little Girl

Kevin Carter (13 September 1960 – 27 July 1994) was a South African photojournalist and member of the Bang-Bang Club. He was the recipient in 1994 of a Pulitzer Prize for his photograph depicting the 1993 famine in Sudan; he died by suicide less than four months afterwards, at the age of 33. His story is depicted in the book The Bang-Bang Club, written by Greg Marinovich and João Silva and published in 2000.

== Early life ==
Kevin Carter was born in Johannesburg, South Africa, and grew up in a middle-class neighbourhood. As a child, he occasionally saw police raids to arrest black people who were illegally living in the area. He said later that he questioned how his parents, a Catholic, "liberal" family of British descent, could be what he described as "lackadaisical" about fighting against apartheid.

After high school, Carter dropped out of his studies to become a pharmacist and was drafted into the army. To escape from the infantry, he enlisted in the Air Force in which he served four years. In 1980, he witnessed a black mess-hall waiter being insulted. Carter defended the man, resulting in him being badly beaten by the other servicemen. He then went absent without leave, attempting to start a new life as a radio disc-jockey named "David". This, however, proved more difficult than he had anticipated. Soon after, he decided to serve out the rest of his required military service. After witnessing the Church Street bombing in Pretoria in 1983, he decided to become a news photographer and journalist.

== Early work ==
After completing his military service, in 1983 Carter returned to Johannesburg and took a job in a photographic supply store. This is how he met local photojournalists and received his first commission. He partnered with the Johannesburg Sunday Express and became a weekend sports photographer. He took photos at Saturday and Sunday matches. In 1984, he moved on to work for the Johannesburg Star, exposing the brutality of apartheid.

Carter was the first to photograph a public "necklacing" execution by black Africans in South Africa in the mid-1980s. Carter later spoke of the images: "I was appalled at what they were doing. But then people started talking about those pictures... then I felt that maybe my actions hadn't been at all bad. Being a witness to something this horrible wasn't necessarily such a bad thing to do."

== In Sudan ==
In March 1993, Robert Hadley of the UN Operation Lifeline Sudan offered João Silva the opportunity to travel to Sudan and report about the famine in South Sudan embedding with the rebels in that area's civil war. Silva told Carter, who felt it was an opportunity to expand his freelance career and use work as a way to address personal problems. Operation Lifeline Sudan had been having funding difficulties, and the UN believed that publicising the area's famine and needs would help aid organisations sustain funding. Silva and Carter were apolitical and desiring only to photograph.

After flying to Nairobi, the two found out that new fighting in Sudan would force them to wait in that city indefinitely. During this time, Carter made a day trip with the UN to Juba in the south Sudan to photograph a barge with food aid for the region. Soon afterwards, the UN received permission from a rebel group to fly food aid to Ayod. Hadley invited Silva and Carter to fly there with him. Once in Ayod, Silva and Carter separated to shoot photos of famine victims, discussing between themselves the shocking situations they were witnessing. Silva found rebel soldiers who could take him to someone in authority. Carter joined him. One of the soldiers, who did not speak English, was interested in Carter's wristwatch. Carter gave him the cheap watch as a gift. The soldiers served as their bodyguards.

=== Pulitzer Prize photograph in Sudan ===
Carter shot an image of a child who appeared to be a little girl, fallen to the ground from hunger, while a vulture lurked on the ground nearby. He told Silva he was shocked by the situation he had just photographed, and had chased the vulture away. A few minutes later, Carter and Silva boarded a small UN plane and left Ayod for Kongor.

Sold to The New York Times, the photograph first appeared on 26 March 1993, and syndicated worldwide. Hundreds of people contacted the newspaper to ask the fate of the girl. The paper said that according to Carter, "she recovered enough to resume her trek after the vulture was chased away" but that it was unknown whether she reached the UN food center. In April 1994, the photograph won the Pulitzer Prize for Feature Photography.

In 2011, the child's father revealed that the child was actually a boy named Kong Nyong, and had been taken care of by the UN food aid station. According to his family, Nyong had died of "fevers" sometime in 2007.

The photo, and its associated moral and political implications, have appeared in sociological academic journals.

== Other work ==
In March 1994, Carter took a photograph of the three Afrikaner Weerstandsbeweging members being shot during their abortive invasion of Bophuthatswana just before the South African election. Carter ran out of film halfway through the incident. Eamonn McCabe of The Guardian said: "It was a picture that made nearly every front page in the world, the one real photograph of the whole campaign."

== Death ==
Three and a half months after being awarded the Pulitzer Prize for Feature Photography, Carter died of suicide by carbon monoxide poisoning on 27 July 1994 at the age of 33. Desmond Tutu, Archbishop Emeritus of Cape Town, South Africa, wrote of Carter, "And we know a little about the cost of being traumatized that drove some to suicide, that, yes, these people were human beings operating under the most demanding of conditions."

Carter's suicide note read:

I'm really, really sorry. The pain of life overrides the joy to the point that joy does not exist. …depressed … without phone … money for rent … money for child support … money for debts … money!!! … I am haunted by the vivid memories of killings & corpses & anger & pain … of starving or wounded children, of trigger-happy madmen, often police, of killer executioners … I have gone to join Ken if I am that lucky.

— Kevin Carter

The final line is a reference to his recently deceased colleague Ken Oosterbroek.

== In popular culture ==
The 1996 song "Kevin Carter" by rock band Manic Street Preachers, from their fourth album Everything Must Go, was inspired by Carter's life and suicide. The lyrics explored Carter's mental agony and the complex moral questions raised by his photography: 'Hi, Time magazine, hi, Pulitzer Prize/ Tribal scars in Technicolor Bang-bang club, AK-47 hour/ Kevin Carter Hi, Time magazine, hi, Pulitzer Prize/ Vulture stalked white piped lie forever/ Wasted your life in black and white'. The lyrics were written by Richey Edwards shortly before his own disappearance.

A main character in the book House of Leaves, Will Navidson, is a photojournalist who is tormented by guilt over winning a Pulitzer Prize for a photo of a starving Sudanese girl but not helping her. In Footnote 336 it is mentioned that this is "clearly based on Kevin Carter's [...] photograph".

The 2001 album Poets and Madmen, by American heavy metal band Savatage, is inspired by the life and death of Carter.

Carter was portrayed by the Canadian actor Taylor Kitsch in the 2010 film The Bang Bang Club, a film adaptation of the 2000 book The Bang-Bang Club: Snapshots from a Hidden War.
