= The Death of Kevin Carter: Casualty of the Bang Bang Club =

- Directed by: Dan Krauss
- Produced by: Dan Krauss
- Cinematography: Dan Krauss
- Production company: UC Berkeley Graduate School of Journalism
- Distributed by: Cinemax
- Release date: September 18, 2004 (Oakland International Film Festival)
- Running time: 27 minutes
- Country: United States
- Language: English

The Death of Kevin Carter: Casualty of the Bang Bang Club, also known as The Life of Kevin Carter, is a 2004 American documentary short film about the suicide of South African photojournalist Kevin Carter. The film is produced and directed by Dan Krauss as a master's project at the UC Berkeley Graduate School of Journalism. It received a nomination for the Academy Award for Documentary Short Subject.

== Summary ==
It describes how Carter, who won the Pulitzer Prize for a photograph of an emaciated African girl being stalked by a vulture, became depressed by the carnage he witnessed as a photographer in war-torn places. In addition, he was devastated by the death of Ken Oosterbroek, a close friend and colleague who was shot and killed while working in the township of Thokoza.

== Reception ==
In 2006, Maureen Ryan called it "provocative", and noted that it was "surprising(ly) thorough" for a film only a half-hour long, with its short running time being its only weakness.

== See also ==
- Bang-Bang Club
