= Paul Dhel Gum =

South Sudan politician

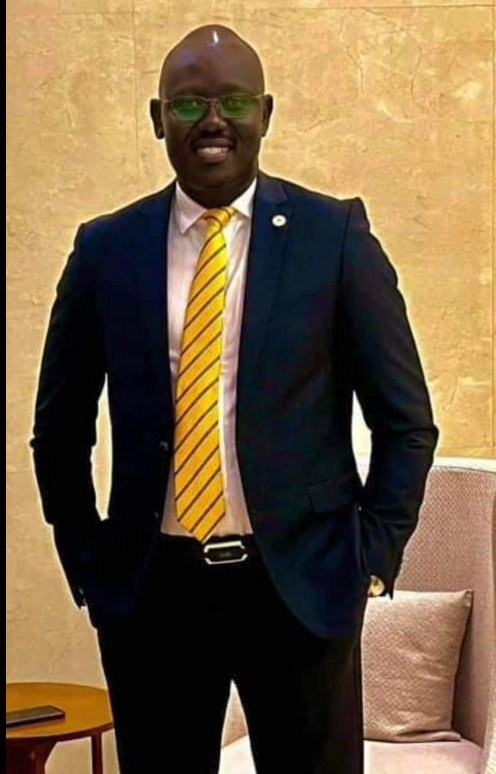
- Paul Dhel Gum in 2025

Undersecretary, Ministry of Transport
- Incumbent
- Assumed office December 2025
- Preceded by: Caeser Oliha Marko

Personal details
- Born: Warrap State, South Sudan
- Party: SPLM
- Occupation: Politician

Paul Dhel Gum is a South Sudanese politician from the Warrap State and the Undersecretary in the Ministry of Transport of the Republic of South Sudan. He has held positions across multiple sectors in the state, including serving as Minister of Health and Minister of Information and Telecommunication. In the early months of 2017, Gum was appointed as the Deputy Chairperson of the South Sudan Relief and Rehabilitation Commission.
