= Taylor Kitsch =

Canadian actor (born 1981)

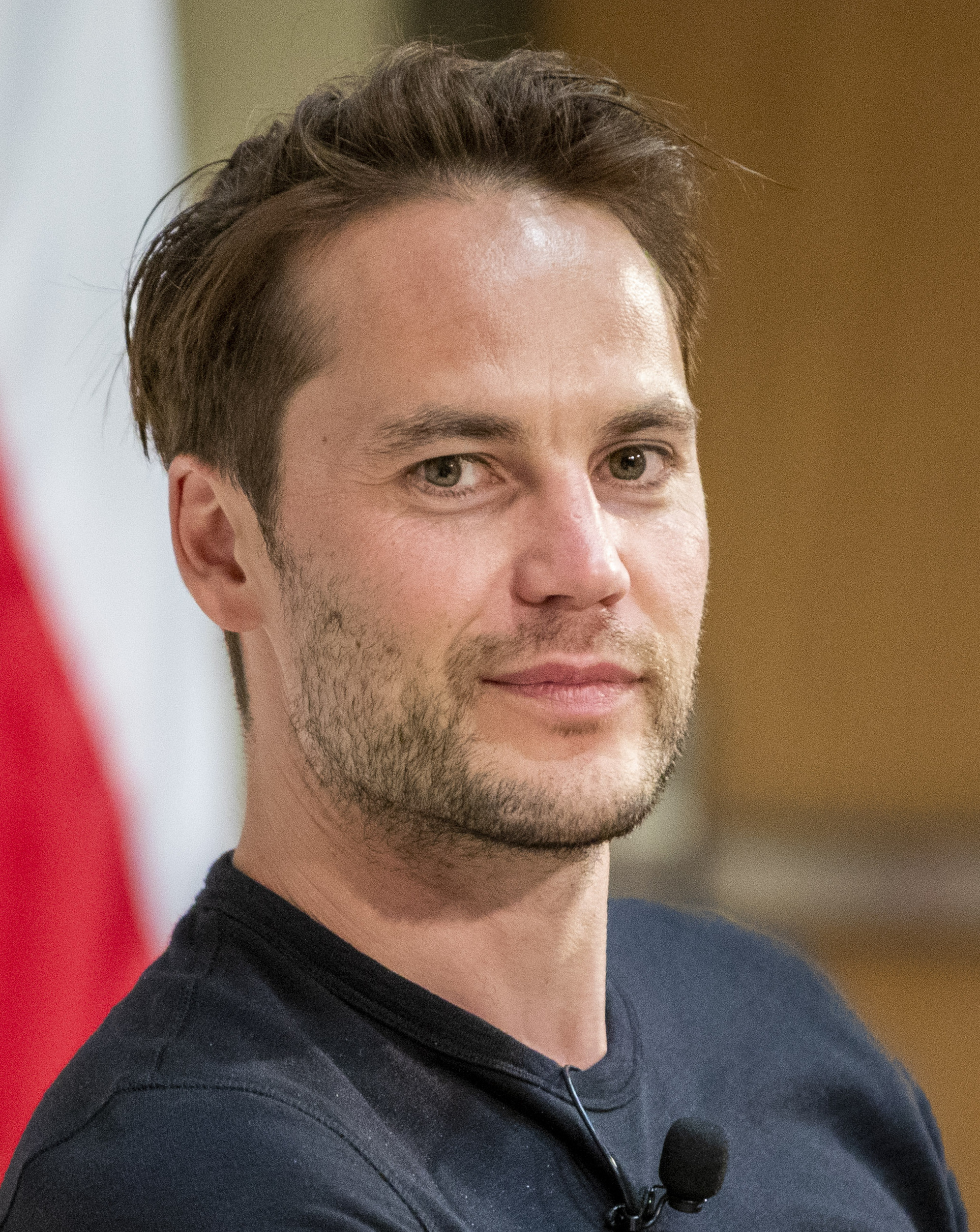
- Kitsch in 2019
- Born: April 8, 1981 (age 45); Kelowna, British Columbia, Canada
- Occupation: Actor
- Years active: 2006–present

Taylor Kitsch (born April 8, 1981) is a Canadian actor. He is known for portraying Tim Riggins in the NBC television series Friday Night Lights (2006–2011). He has also worked in films such as X-Men Origins: Wolverine (2009), Battleship (2012), John Carter (2012), Savages (2012), Lone Survivor (2013), The Grand Seduction (2014), American Assassin (2017), Only The Brave (2017), and 21 Bridges (2019).

Kitsch starred in the second season of the HBO series True Detective (2015) and the television film The Normal Heart (2014), as well as portrayed David Koresh in the Paramount Network miniseries Waco (2018) and CIA Ground Branch operative Ben Edwards in the Amazon Prime Video series The Terminal List (2022) and The Terminal List: Dark Wolf (2025).

== Early life ==
Kitsch was born in Kelowna, British Columbia. His mother, Susan (Green), worked for the BC Liquor Board, while his father, Drew Kitsch, worked in construction. His parents separated when he was one year old, and he and his two older brothers, Brody and Daman, were raised by their mother in a mobile home park. He also has two younger maternal half-sisters. Kitsch lived in Port Moody and Anmore. He attended Gleneagle Secondary School in Coquitlam. Kitsch started playing ice hockey at age three, and played junior ice hockey for the Langley Hornets in the British Columbia Hockey League, before a knee injury ended his career in 2002. Following his injury, Kitsch took nutrition and economics courses at the University of Lethbridge for a year and lived with his brother.

== Career ==
Kitsch moved to New York City in 2003, after receiving an opportunity to pursue modelling with IMG; he studied acting. He supported himself as a nutritionist and personal trainer. For a time in New York, he was homeless and took to sleeping on subway trains.

In 2004, he relocated to Los Angeles, where he modelled for Diesel and Abercrombie & Fitch. He appeared in the limited-edition coffee table book About Face by celebrity photographer John Russo.

In 2006, Kitsch was cast in his breakout role on the NBC sports teen drama television series Friday Night Lights, based on Peter Berg's 2004 film of the same name and set in the fictional town of Dillon, Texas. For five seasons Kitsch portrayed the role of Tim Riggins, a high school student who is the fullback/running back of the Dillon Panthers. The series premiered in October 2006 to acclaim from critics and over 7.7 million viewers. Kitsch has ruled out reprising his role in a potential film sequel to the television series.

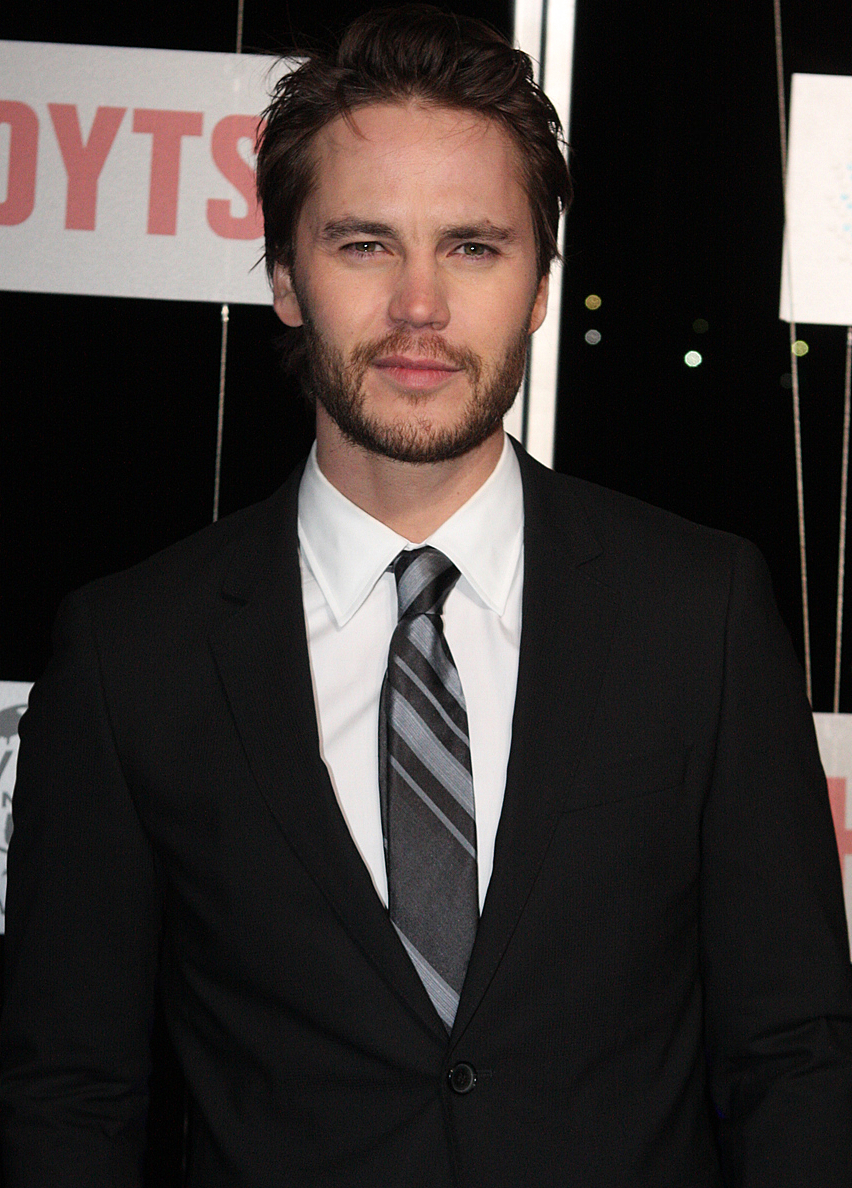
Kitsch in 2012

He played Pogue Parry in The Covenant, alongside Steven Strait, Sebastian Stan, Laura Ramsey, Toby Hemingway, Jessica Lucas, and Chace Crawford. In February 2008, he signed on to play Gambit in the X-Men franchise spinoff X-Men Origins: Wolverine, released in May 2009. Of the fan-favorite character Gambit, Kitsch states, "I knew of him, but I didn't know the following he had. I'm sure I'm still going to be exposed to that. I love the character, I love the powers, and I love what they did with him. I didn't know that much, but in my experience, it was a blessing to go in and create my take on him. I'm excited for it, to say the least."

In 2010, Kitsch starred in Steven Silver's The Bang Bang Club, an historical drama set in South Africa that documents the final bloody days of the apartheid. He had to lose 35 pounds (16 kg) in two months to play the role of photojournalist Kevin Carter, alongside Ryan Phillippe and Malin Åkerman. In November 2010, The Hollywood Reporter named Kitsch as one of the young male actors who is "'pushing – or being pushed' into taking over Hollywood as the new 'A-List.'" In the 2012 Disney film John Carter, based on Edgar Rice Burroughs's fantasy novel A Princess of Mars, he played the title character, a Confederate soldier who is transported to Mars. While the film flopped at the box office, Kitsch said, "I'm very proud of John Carter. Box office doesn't validate me as a person, or as an actor." In May 2012, Kitsch starred in Peter Berg's Battleship, based on Hasbro's toy game, as Lieutenant Alex Hopper. The film marked his reunion with Berg and former Friday Night Lights co-star, Jesse Plemons.

In July 2012, he starred in Oliver Stone's Savages, with Blake Lively, Salma Hayek and Aaron Taylor-Johnson. HitFix's film critic Drew McWeeny wrote positively of Kitsch's bond with Johnson which he described as "not only credible but lived in and authentic throughout the film". McWeeny wrote that Kitsch was used the right way in this film with an ensemble cast that pushed him or challenged him in scenes which resulted in his playing them with appropriate intensity.

In 2013, Kitsch starred in The Grand Seduction, a remake of Jean-François Pouliot's French-Canadian La Grande Séduction (2003), directed by Don McKellar. He also was in another Peter Berg film, Lone Survivor, based on Marcus Luttrell's book of the same name. He plays alongside Jim Parsons, Julia Roberts, and Mark Ruffalo in Ryan Murphy's The Normal Heart, which aired on HBO on May 25, 2014. Kitsch was in negotiations for the lead role in the American remake of The Raid. The remake never became a reality.

Kitsch starred in the sophomore season of True Detective, opposite Vince Vaughn, Rachel McAdams, and Colin Farrell. Kitsch was set to write, direct and star in the drama Pieces.

In 2017, Kitsch starred in American Assassin and Only the Brave. In 2018, he played cult leader David Koresh in the Paramount Channel miniseries Waco. Later that year, it was announced that Kitsch had an in-development series which landed at HBO. From Sons of Anarchy writer John Barcheski and director Matt Shakman, the series would see Kitsch lead the cast and produce the series. In 2019, Kitsch starred in 21 Bridges with Chadwick Boseman and Sienna Miller. Also in 2019, it was announced that Kitsch would appear as the lead in Neill Blomkamp's Inferno.

In 2020, Kitsch starred in the German TV series The Defeated, which also starred Michael C. Hall, Logan Marshall-Green, Nina Hoss, and Tuppence Middleton. He was tapped to replace Colson Baker, better known as Machine Gun Kelly, in the film Savage Salvation, where he would have starred alongside Robert De Niro and John Malkovich. Kitsch dropped out for unknown reasons and was replaced by Jack Huston. In early 2021, it was announced that Kitsch would star as Ben Edwards opposite Chris Pratt in Antoine Fuqua's The Terminal List. Additional cast members include Riley Keough, Constance Wu, and Jeanne Tripplehorn. In 2025, he starred in the Netflix television series American Primeval alongside Betty Gilpin.

== Personal life ==
Kitsch purchased 3.64 acres (1.47 ha) of land on Lake Austin, Texas, in 2012 and began building a house there in 2015. Kitsch currently resides in Bozeman, Montana. While collaborating on the film Lone Survivor, he became friends with retired Navy SEAL Marcus Luttrell and has since been interested in veterans' issues.

== Filmography ==
=== Film ===
| Year | Title | Role | Notes |
|---|---|---|---|
| 2006 | John Tucker Must Die | Justin | |
| 2006 | Snakes on a Plane | Kyle "Crocodile" Cho | |
| 2006 | The Covenant | Pogue Parry | |
| 2008 | Gospel Hill | Joel Herrod | |
| 2009 | X-Men Origins: Wolverine | Remy LeBeau / Gambit | |
| 2010 | The Bang Bang Club | Kevin Carter | |
| 2012 | John Carter | John Carter | |
| 2012 | Battleship | Lieutenant Alex Hopper | |
| 2012 | Savages | John "Chon" McAllister Jr. | |
| 2013 | Lone Survivor | Lieutenant Michael P. "Murph" Murphy | |
| 2013 | The Grand Seduction | Dr. Paul Lewis | |
| 2016 | Bling | Sam | Voice role |
| 2017 | American Assassin | Ronnie "Ghost" | |
| 2017 | Only the Brave | Christopher MacKenzie | |
| 2019 | 21 Bridges | Ray Jackson | |
| TBA | Eleven Days | Jim Estelle | Post-production |

=== Television ===
| Year | Title | Role | Notes |
|---|---|---|---|
| 2006 | Godiva's | Colm | Episode: "Flipping Switches" |
| 2006 | Kyle XY | Male Camper | Episode: "Pilot" |
| 2006–2011 | Friday Night Lights | Tim Riggins | 68 episodes |
| 2014 | The Normal Heart | Bruce Niles | Television film |
| 2015 | True Detective | Paul Woodrugh | 8 episodes |
| 2018 | Waco | David Koresh | Miniseries: 6 episodes; also executive producer |
| 2020 | The Defeated | Max McLaughlin | Miniseries: 6 episodes; also executive producer |
| 2022–2026 | The Terminal List | Ben Edwards | Main role (season 1), Guest role (season 2); 9 episodes |
| 2023 | Painkiller | Glen Kryger | Miniseries: 6 episodes |
| 2025 | American Primeval | Isaac Reed | Miniseries: 6 episodes |
| 2025 | The Terminal List: Dark Wolf | Ben Edwards | Lead role; also executive producer |

== Awards and nominations ==
| Year | Award | Category | Work | Result |
|---|---|---|---|---|
| 2007 | Teen Choice Awards | Choice TV: Breakout | Friday Night Lights | Nominated |
| 2008 | Teen Choice Awards | Choice TV Actor: Drama | Friday Night Lights | Nominated |
| 2009 | Teen Choice Awards | Choice Movie Fresh Face Male | X-Men Origins: Wolverine | Nominated |
| 2010 | People's Choice Awards | Favorite On-Screen Team | X-Men Origins: Wolverine | Nominated |
| 2012 | Genie Awards | Best Performance by an Actor in a Supporting Role | The Bang Bang Club | Nominated |
| 2012 | CinemaCon Awards | Male Star of Tomorrow | Himself | Honoured |
| 2014 | Online Film and Television Association Awards | Best Supporting Actor in a Motion Picture or Miniseries | The Normal Heart | Nominated |
| 2024 | Critics' Choice Awards | Best Supporting Actor in a Movie/Miniseries | Painkiller | Nominated |
