= João Silva (photographer) =

Portuguese-born South African war photographer

- João Silva by Claude Truong-Ngoc (2022)
- Born: 9 August 1966 (age 60); Lisbon, Portugal
- Occupation: Photographer
- Years active: 1989–present
- Spouse: Vivian Silva
- Children: 2

João Silva (born 9 August 1966) is a Portuguese-born South African war photographer. He is the last working member of the Bang-Bang Club, a group of photographers who covered South Africa from the time of Nelson Mandela's release from prison in 1990, to the country's first multiracial elections in 1994. He has worked in Africa, the Balkans, Central Asia, Russia, and the Middle East.

In October 2010, Silva stepped on a land mine while on patrol with invading US soldiers in Kandahar, Afghanistan and lost his left leg below the knee, and his right leg from just above it. After recovery and receiving two prostheses, his first assignment out of Walter Reed Army Medical Center for The New York Times was at the White House. He now works as staff photographer for The New York Times in Africa.

== Early life ==
Silva was born in Lisbon, Portugal. He came to South Africa when he was nine years old. His parents immigrated from Portuguese Mozambique to South Africa, because of the Mozambican War of Independence. Silva was sent to stay with his godfather to Portugal for a year. After his parents re-settled in Vereeniging, south of Johannesburg, Silva came on an immigrant visa to South Africa. Studying at a local high school, he decided to drop out, telling his parents that the school had nothing more to teach him.

A friend of mine was studying graphic design and one of his subjects was photography. One of the projects that he had to do was on speed, motion. He came to the racetrack with us to photograph the race cars going around in circles, and I kind of thought: "O.K., I can see myself in this role. This thing is right for me." That was the first time I ever took pictures. The bug bit.

Silva gave up his other jobs, bought a second-hand camera and studied black-and-white photography at a vocational night school. At the end of 1989, he moved to Johannesburg and established himself as photographer.

== Early career ==
Silva began working as freelancer for the Johannesburg Herald in 1990. Beside his jobs for the Alberton Record in 1991, taking pictures of road accidents and Rotary meetings, he photographed the conflict zones of Thokoza and Soweto. There, he shot his first pictures of the killings in the developing violence in the townships. Weeks later he showed his portfolio to the Reuters office in Johannesburg and arranged to submit photos for possible publication. He soon left the paper and worked as a freelancer for Reuters. His next step was to go with a new portfolio to The Star, where Ken Oosterbroek saw the pictures. Silva then began to freelance for the Sunday Star and was later hired by Oosterbroek as a staff photographer.

== Silva and Kevin Carter in Sudan ==
=== Invitation by UN Operation Lifeline Sudan ===
In March 1993, Robert Hadley, information officer for the UN Operation Lifeline Sudan, invited Silva and Kevin Carter to come to Sudan and report on the 1993 famine in South Sudan. The two flew to Nairobi to get from there to Sudan. Increasing fighting in Sudan held them up in Nairobi, but Carter managed to fly with the UN for one day to Juba in the south Sudan to take photos of a barge, used as a route for food aid for the region. The UN then received permission from a rebel group to fly food aid to Ayod, and Robert Hadley invited Silva and Carter to accompany him on this trip.

=== In Ayod ===
The following day, they arrived on a light plane to the tiny hamlet of Ayod. The cargo plane landed shortly thereafter. The villagers were already waiting next to the runway to get food, wrote Marinovich, and "the mother had joined waiting for food leaving her children on the sandy ground nearby." Silva and Carter separated to shoot pictures of children and the people, the living and dead victims of the hunger catastrophe that had arisen through the war. Carter went several times to Silva to tell him about the shocking situation he had just photographed. Witnessing the famine touched his emotions very strongly. Silva was searching for rebel soldiers who could take him to someone in authority. He found some soldiers and Carter joined him. The soldiers did not speak English, but one was interested in Carter's wrist watch. Carter gave him his cheap wrist watch as a gift. The soldiers were their bodyguards and followed them for their protection.

To stay a week with the rebels they needed the permission of a rebel commander. Their plane would take off in an hour and without the permission they had to fly back. Again they separated and Silva went to the clinic complex to ask for the rebel commander. The rebel commander was to find in Kongor, south Sudan he was told. That was good news for Silva, "their small UN plane was heading there next". He left the clinic and went back to the runway, taking on his way pictures of children and people. It was then that "he came across a child lying on his face in the hot sun – and he took a picture".

== Prize-winning "The vulture and the little girl" photograph in Sudan ==
As a result, Silva was nearby when Carter took his Pulitzer Prize-winning photograph "The vulture and the little girl": Carter approached Silva on the runway, came quickly towards him and said:

'You won't believe what I've just shot! … I was shooting this kid on her knees, and then changed my angle, and suddenly there was this vulture right behind her! … And I just kept shooting – shot lots of film!'

Silva asked him where he shot the picture and was looking around to take the photo too. Carter pointed to a place 50 m (160 ft) away. Then Carter told him that he had chased the vulture away. Carter was completely shocked by the situation he had just photographed. He said to Silva, "I see all this, and all I can think of is [Carter's young daughter] Megan." Lighting a cigarette, he became more emotional saying, "I can't wait to hug her when I get home." A few minutes later they got into the small UN plane and left Ayod for Kongor.

== Conflict and war photographer ==
On 23 October 2010, Silva stepped on a land mine while on patrol with US soldiers in Kandahar, Afghanistan and lost his left leg below the knee, and his right leg from just above it.

In 2011 Silva spoke at Bronx Documentary Center in New York about his life as photojournalist. His speech was published in The New York Times and the lens.blogs.nytimes.com. He told the audience: "I don't really use the term 'war photographer' in describing myself... But as a photojournalist, you have a lot more responsibilities than just being at war." He continued: "I'm a historian with a camera, and hopefully my pictures use the medium to capture history, or to tell a story, or to highlight somebody else's suffering. That's ultimately why I continue doing it, and why I want to continue doing it."

Silva spoke in the section "The Human Being Behind the Camera" of that some people think behind the camera is a machine, a photographer without any feelings. He said that he was often asked how it was possible that he could photograph such cruel pictures. His answer was: "If you want to help people, then you should not become a photographer". But he said also, "We help people all the time." To take wounded people in his car to the hospital or to help just with small things was just normal too. But not every time, as Marinovich explained in his book.

As an example, some pictures are so strong that people are horrified. He mentions the famous picture by Kevin Carter from Sudan. Some people criticized the photographer for taking the picture. Silva says to the criticism:

He was highly criticized for that picture. People who had no place in criticizing him — people who had no understanding of the dynamics that it took to make that picture. ... Ultimately that image was such a strong message of famine. Suddenly there was this influx of money that came out of nowhere. He saved more lives by taking that picture than he would have by not taking the picture.

== Back to work ==
Silva was treated at the Walter Reed Army Medical Center, after The New York Times insisted that he get the best medical attention. After more than eighty operations and rehabilitation training, he was working again as photographer. In between, he took part in a marathon, a year after he stepped on the landmine. He took part in the New York City Marathon on a hand-cranked bike finishing it in 2 hours 38 minutes. In December 2011, he returned home in Johannesburg, South Africa, as a staff member of The New York Times.

After returning to South Africa, Silva bought a Harley-Davidson XL883L Super Low, motorcycles being part of his passion. Silva had it modified to be able to ride the motorcycle with his prostheses. To test it he went to a racetrack accomplishing fifty laps.

In 2025, Silva returned to visit the village in Afghanistan where he lost his legs to a landmine.

== Exhibitions ==
Work from Silva's first 20 years as a conflict photographer was first displayed at the 25th annual Visa pour l'Image international photojournalism festival in Perpignan, France. Later his images were included in an exhibition in New York, Munich, Milan and Johannesburg.

Group exhibitions

- 2010 Visa Pour l'Image, international photojournalism festival, Perpignan, France,
- 2013 Visa Pour l'Image 2013, Perpignan, France
- 2014 Rise and Fall of Apartheid: Photography and the Bureaucracy of Everyday Life, Museum Africa, Johannesburg, South Africa. The exhibition opened in September 2012 in New York and travelled via Munich, Milan to Johannesburg.

Solo exhibition

- 2014–2015 João Silva: A Man Torn Apart by War, Museum Africa, Johannesburg, South Africa.

== Awards ==
- 1992: South African Press Photographer of the Year Award
- 1992: 2nd prize and an honourable mention in the World Press Photo awards
- 1995: Selected for the World Press Photo Joop Swart Masterclass
- 2006: World Press Photo: Award-winning photographer, Contemporary Issues, second prize singles
- 2007: World Press Photo: Award-winning photographer, Spot News, Honorable Mention prize stories
- 2011: Chevalier de l'Ordre des Arts et Lettres on 4 April 2011, France
- 2012: Order of Liberty (Ordem da Liberdade) by the Portuguese Government
- 2012: Honorary doctorate in Fine Arts, Corcoran School of Arts and Design in Washington DC, USA

== Published works ==
- The Bang-Bang Club: Snapshots from a Hidden War, Greg Marinovich and Silva
- In the Company of God, Silva
