= Frank Rautenbach =

South African actor and producer

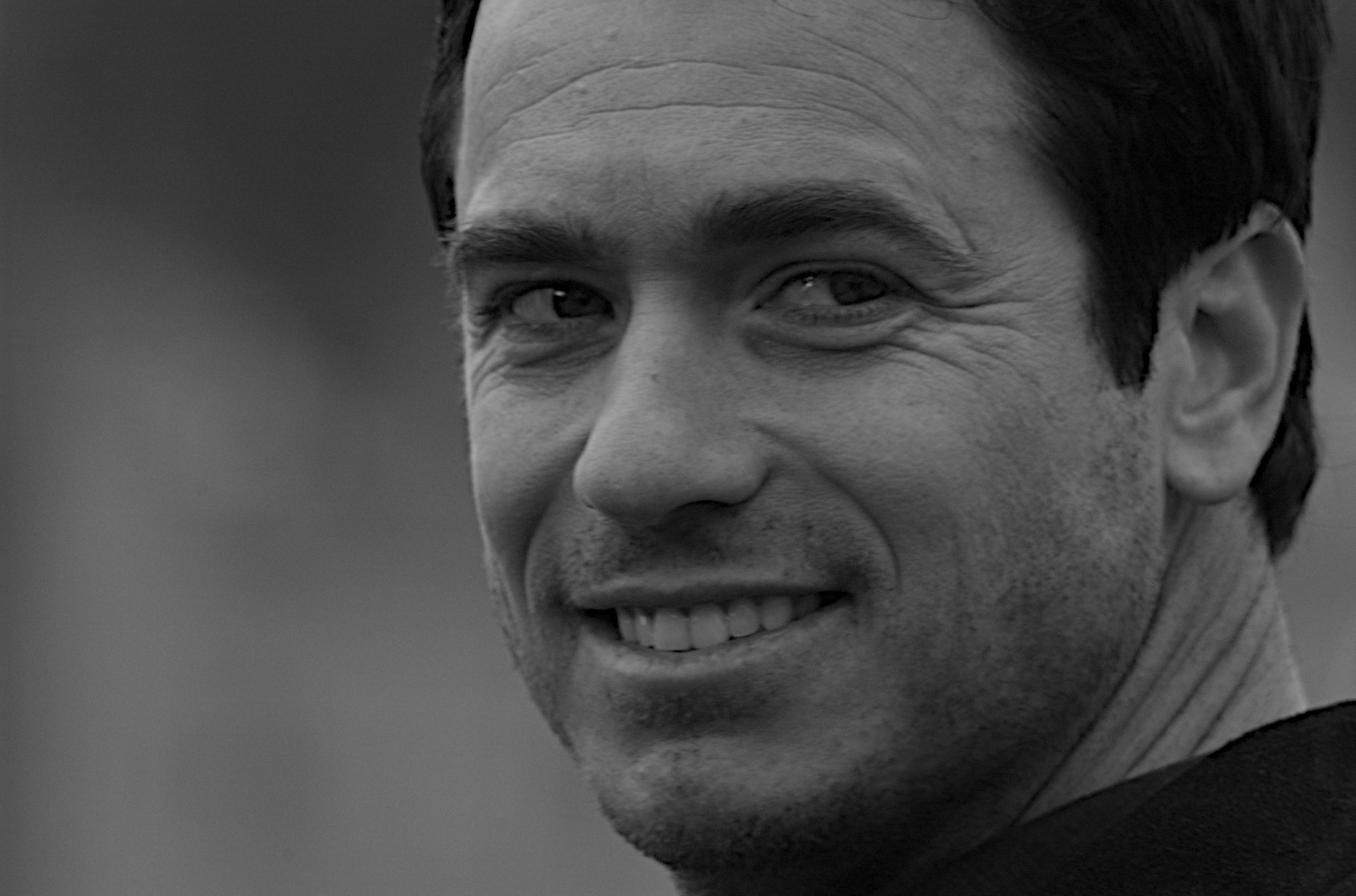
- Born: Leon Francois Rautenbach; 12 May 1972 (age 54); East London, Eastern Cape, South Africa
- Occupations: Director, Actor, Producer
- Years active: 2005–present
- Height: 1.82 m (6 ft 0 in)
- Spouse: Leigh Rautenbach (m. 1996)

Leon Francois Rautenbach (born 12 May 1972), popularly known as Frank Rautenbach, is a South African actor and producer. He is best known for the roles in the films Faith Like Potatoes, The Bang Bang Club and biographical film Hansie: A True Story.

== Personal life ==
Rautenbach was born on 12 May 1972 in East London, South Africa.

He is married to production manager, Leigh Rautenbach since February 24, 1996.

== Career ==
In 2006, he made his film debut with Faith Like Potatoes directed by Regardt van den Bergh. The film is a biographical drama based on the book written by Angus Buchan. In 2008, he acted in the biographical sports film Hansie directed by van den Bergh. In the film he played the lead role of former South African cricketer Hansie Cronjé. After that success, he then made another lead role in The Bang Bang Club, a biographical film about the lives of four photojournalists active within the townships of South Africa during the apartheid period. The film received mixed reviews from critics.

In 2019, he acted in the martial arts crime drama television series Warrior by playing the role of "Patterson". The film became a blockbuster in that year. In 2020, he joined with the cast of popular soap opera 7de Laan and played the supportive role "Tiaan Terreblanche".

== Filmography ==
Year	Film	Role	Genre	Ref.
2006	Faith like Potatoes	Angus Buchan	Film	
2008	Hansie: A True Story	Hansie Cronjé	Film	
2010	The Bang Bang Club	Ken	Film	
2012	The Wolf	The Wolf	Short film	
2013	Turnipseed: Second Chance	Art	Short film	
2013	The Film-Maker's Son	Paul Stone	Film	
2014	Turnipseed: Legacy	Art	Short film	
2014	Born to Win	dialogue editor	Film	
2015	Metal Gear Solid V: The Phantom Pain	Soldiers / Extras (voice)	Video game	
2016	Farm 1	Arseney	Short film	
2017	Ink Therapy	associate producer	TV series	
2017	What's in My Pocket?	associate producer	TV series	
2017	Charged and Disbarred	associate producer	TV series	
2018	Ligweg	Writer	TV series	
2019	Warrior	Patterson	TV series	
2019	Michael W Smith: Divine Interruptions	post production producer	Documentary short	
2019	Uit Die Veld Geslaan	post production producer	TV series	
2019	RoepRegstreeks	voice over artist	TV series	
2019	Uit Die Veld Geslaan	Director	TV series	
2020	Delivering Promises	Father	Film	
2020	Mr Johnson	Craig Slater	Film	
2021	Lioness	Jason	TV series	
2020	7de Laan	Tiaan Terreblanche	TV series	
2022	Wild Is the Wind	John Smit	Film	
2024	Summertide	Martin Field	TV series	
TBD	Kern	Actor	TV series	
TBD	Shaidan	Renley	Film	
