= Peter Krogh =

Peter Krogh could refer to:

- Peter Krogh (photographer) (born 1960), American photographer
- Peter Krogh (handballer) (born 1990), Faroese handballer
- Peter F. Krogh (born 1937), American academic and government official
