= Matloff =

Matloff is a surname originating from Eastern European Jewish communities, which occurs mostly in The Americas. Notable people with the surname include:

- Judith Matloff (born 1958), American journalist
- Norman Matloff (born 1948), American computer scientist
