= Maurice Matloff =

American military historian

- Born: 1915; New York City, New York, U.S.
- Died: July 14, 1993 (aged 77–78); Rockville, Maryland, U.S.
- Education: Columbia University; Harvard University
- Occupation: Military Historian
- Employer: United States Army Center of Military History
- Known for: Chief historian of the United States Army from 1970 to 1981
- Relatives: Judith Matloff (niece)

Maurice Matloff (1915 – July 14, 1993) was an American military historian. He was chief historian of the Army and an expert on strategic planning in World War II.

== Biography ==
Matloff was born in 1915 in New York City. He graduated from Columbia College and received his master's and doctorate from Harvard University. Matloff was an instructor at Brooklyn College before joining the army during World War II.

He began his career as military historian while in the army, writing a historical account of the Fourth Air Force. He joined the United States Army Center of Military History as a civilian and served as chief historian from 1970 to 1981. He was the author of a number of books on United States military strategy in World War II and military history of the United States. He also conducted an oral history program for the United States Department of Defense.

Matloff taught at Georgetown University, and held appointments at Dartmouth College, University of California at Berkeley, University of Georgia, University of Maryland, San Francisco State College, University of California, Davis and the U.S. Military Academy at West Point. He was also a visiting fellow at the Woodrow Wilson International Center for Scholars.

Matloff was a member of the Cosmos Club, the American Historical Association, the Organization of American Historians and the Society for Historians of American Foreign Relations. He was a recipient of the Department of the Army Meritorious Civilian Service Award, the Meritorious Public Service Medal, and the Department of the Army Distinguished Civilian Service Award.

== Personal life ==
Matloff died on July 14, 1993, in Rockville, Maryland. His niece, Judith Matloff, is a writer and journalist.
