= Peter Krogh (photographer) =

American photographer (born 1960)

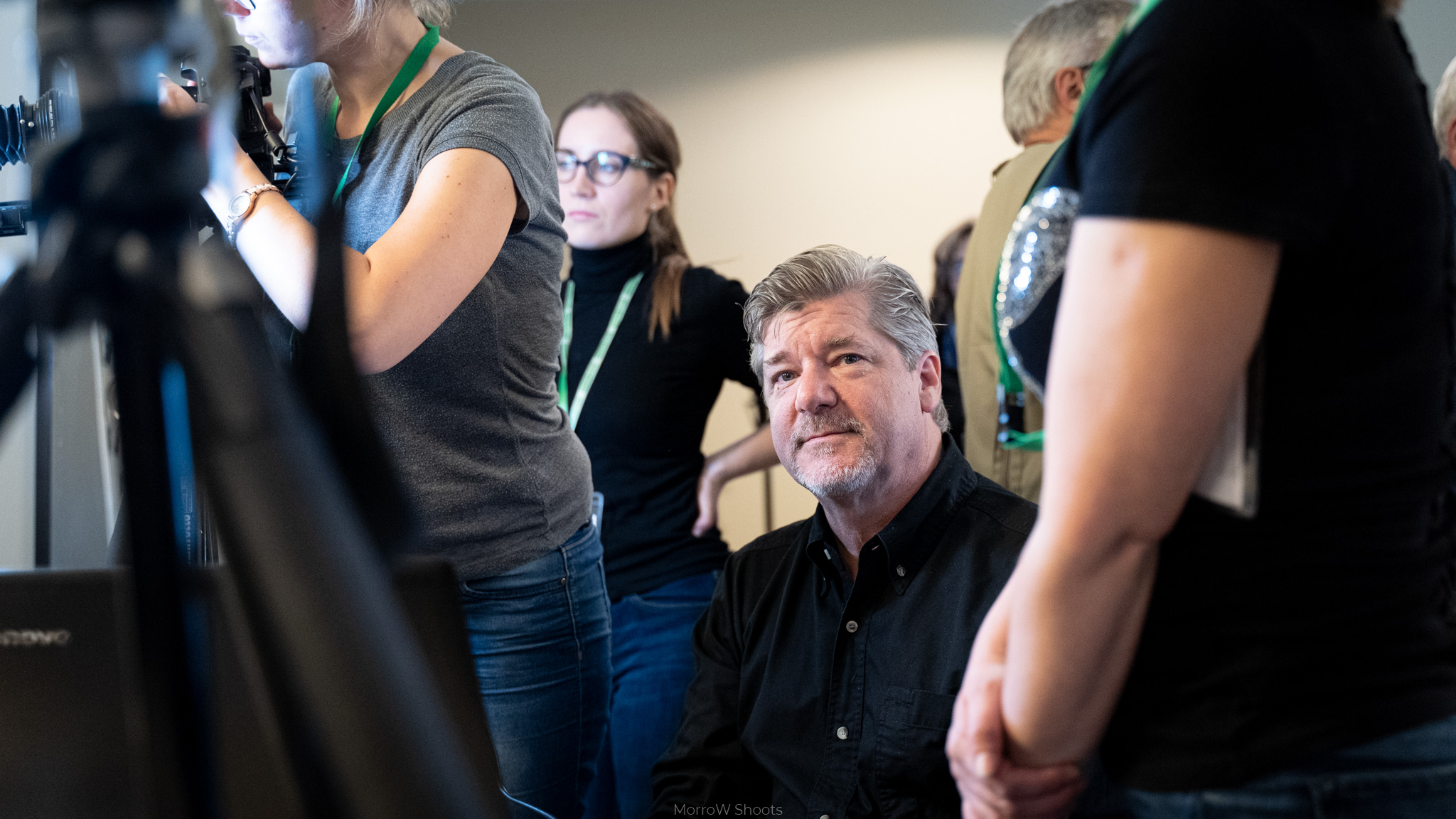
- Krogh during a camera scanning workshop in Tallinn, Estonia (October 2019)
- Born: November 9, 1960 (age 65)
- Education: University of North Carolina at Chapel Hill
- Occupations: Photographer; author; filmmaker; publisher
- Known for: Work in digital asset management

Peter Krogh (born November 9, 1960) is an American photographer, author, public speaker, filmmaker and publisher. He is best known for his work in the field of digital asset management (DAM).

== Professional career ==
Krogh attended the University of North Carolina at Chapel Hill, where he majored in American Studies, before developing a career as an editorial and commercial photographer.

In 2006, his first book, The DAM Book - Digital Asset Management for Photographers, was published by O'Reilly Media, outlining a system for the creation of a unified digital photo archive using Adobe Bridge and iView Media Pro (now Phase One Media Pro) software. It also outlined the use of metadata in photographic images and storage practices for digital photos. In 2009, the second edition of The DAM Book added the use of Adobe Photoshop Lightroom to the described workflow. These books have been translated into French, German and Spanish.

He has served on the American Society of Media Photographers (ASMP) Board of Directors, and as of 2014 is the Digital Standards and Practices Chair. Krogh has also been a contributing editor to the Universal Photographic Digital Imaging Guidelines project, a joint effort by trade organizations worldwide to standardize digital photography practice.

In 2010, Krogh was a co-creator of dpBestflow.org. The project was funded by the US Library of Congress under an NDIIPP award to ASMP. The project was directed by Richard Anderson, with Krogh serving as a principal author. In 2011, Krogh took over as project director.

In 2011, Krogh worked as a principal on the Shutha.org project (defunct), which provided educational material to photographers and multimedia storytellers in the developing world to help them enter the global digital content marketplace. Krogh brought the Drupal framework created for dpBestflow.org to shutha.org to provide a content management framework.

Krogh has made presentations and led workshops for photographers worldwide. These include PhotoPlus East, Photokina, Imaging USA, WPPI, Society for Photographic Education, Photoshop World, South by Southwest, the Palm Springs Photo Festival, The Photo Metadata Conference, IS&T Archiving 2010, CEPIC, Look3, FotoweekDC, Microsoft Pro Photo Summit, Santa Fe Workshops, PhotoFusion, Eddie Adams Workshop, Photofest Houston, as well as numerous appearances for photo associations ASMP, American Photography Association, NZIIP, AOP, AIPP. In 2008 he led workshops in three cities in South Africa under the leadership of Africa Media Online.

Krogh created Adobe Bridge scripts with Tom Nolan and published them under the company name DAM Useful Software. In 2013, he founded DAM Useful Publishing. The first product was the 2009 version of The DAM Book, delivered in electronic form. In September 2013, DAM Useful Publishing created its first new eBook, The DAM Book Guide to Multi-catalog Workflow with Lightroom 5. This was followed in December 2013 by The DAM Book Guide to Organizing Your Photos with Lightroom 5.

In August 2014, Krogh took on the role of Product Architect at PhotoShelter, Inc to develop a cloud-based DAM service with enterprise-level permissions and access control. PhotoShelter Libris was launched at DAM Los Angeles 2014 in November 2014.

== Honors and awards ==
In 2012, Krogh received the Individual Innovation Award from the United States Library of Congress's National Digital Information Infrastructure and Preservation Program.

Krogh was named by Microsoft to be part of its Icons of Imaging Program designed to celebrate and showcase professional photographers who are recognized around the world as leaders in photography and digital imaging.
