= Bang-Bang Club =

1990s South African photojournalistic group

The Bang-Bang Club was a group of four conflict photographers, Kevin Carter, Greg Marinovich, Ken Oosterbroek, and João Silva, active within the townships of South Africa between 1990 and 1994 during the transition from a herrenvolk democracy (apartheid system) to a multiracial democracy. This period included much factional violence, particularly fighting between African National Congress (ANC) and Inkatha Freedom Party (IFP) supporters, after the lifting of the bans on both political parties. The Afrikaner Weerstandsbeweging (AWB) and other groups were also involved in the violence.

A film about the group, also titled The Bang Bang Club, directed by Steven Silver premiered at the Toronto International Film Festival in 2010.

== History ==
The name "The Bang Bang Club" was born out of an article published in the South African magazine Living. Originally named The Bang Bang Paparazzi, it was changed to "Club" because the members felt the word paparazzi misrepresented their work. The name comes from the culture itself; township residents spoke to the photographers about the "bang-bang" in reference to violence occurring within their communities, but more literally, "bang-bang" refers to the sound of gunfire and is a colloquialism used by conflict photographers.

On 18 April 1994, during a firefight between the National Peacekeeping Force and African National Congress supporters in the Thokoza township, friendly fire killed Oosterbroek and seriously injured Marinovich. An inquest into Oosterbroek's death began in 1995. The magistrate ruled that no party should be blamed for the death. In 1999, peacekeeper Brian Mkhize told Marinovich and Silva that he believed that the bullet that killed Oosterbroek had come from the National Peacekeeping Force.

In July 1994, Carter committed suicide.

On 23 October 2010, Silva stepped on a land mine while on patrol with U.S. soldiers in Kandahar, Afghanistan and lost both legs below the knee.

== Awards ==
Two members won Pulitzer Prizes for their photography. Greg Marinovich won the Pulitzer for Spot News Photography in 1991 for his coverage of the killing of Lindsaye Tshabalala in 1990. Kevin Carter won the Pulitzer for Featured Photography in 1994 for his 1993 photograph of a vulture that appeared to be stalking a starving child in southern Sudan.

Ken Oosterbroek won second prize in the 1993 World Press Photo Photo Contest for the Stories, General News category. Oosterbroek was also nominated for Ilford Press Photographer of the Year in 1989 and 1994 and nominated for the South African Press Photographer of The Year three times.

João Silva won the South African Press Photographer of the Year Award in 1992 and received an honorable mention in the 2007 World Press Photo Photo Contest in the Stories, Spot News category.

== Reception ==
The work by the members of the Bang-Bang Club between 1990 and 1994 was well known in South Africa. The fight against apartheid on the way to multiracial democracy was becoming a bloodbath at this time and Desmond Tutu, Archbishop Emeritus of Cape Town, South Africa wrote in the foreword of the book The Bang-bang Club: Snapshots From A Hidden War, 2000. The story of this fight needed to be told to the world, Tutu wrote.

We were greatly blessed to have some of the most gifted journalists and brilliant photographers. They helped to tell the story. They captured some riveting moments on film, such as a gruesome necklacing (Kevin Carter), and the barbaric turning on a helpless victim by a baying crowd from one or other side of the conflict (Greg Marinovich).

Tutu remarked that the work by the Bang-Bang Club was affecting the life of the photographers too: "And we know a little about the cost of being traumatized that drove some to suicide, that, yes, these people were human beings operating under the most demanding of conditions."

== Book ==
In 2000, Marinovich and Silva published The Bang-Bang Club: Snapshots from a Hidden War (2000), a book documenting their experiences. Marinovich said that the group did not see themselves as a club in the way outside observers regarded them, writing in the preface "The name gives a mental image of a group of hard-living men who worked, played and hung out together pretty much all of the time. Let us set the record straight: there never was such a creature, there never was a club, and there never were just the four of us in some kind of silver halide cult – dozens of journalists covered the violence during the period from Nelson Mandela's release from jail to the first fully democratic election.

Marinovich said of the key members of the Bang-Bang Club "We discovered that one of the strongest links among us was questions about the morality of what we do: when do you press the shutter release and when do you cease being a photographer?"

== In popular culture ==
The Bang-Bang Club are referenced in the 1996 Manic Street Preachers song "Kevin Carter" from their fourth album Everything Must Go. The song was inspired by Carter's life and suicide and features the lyric "Bang-Bang Club, AK-47 Hour." The album Poets and Madmen by Savatage is inspired by the life of Kevin Carter.

== Films ==
A film adaptation of Marinovich and Silva's book, The Bang Bang Club (2010), was shot on location in Thokoza township by South African documentary film-maker Steven Silver. Marinovich worked as a consultant on the film which starred Ryan Phillippe as Greg Marinovich, Taylor Kitsch as Kevin Carter, Neels Van Jaarsveld as João Silva and Frank Rautenbach as Ken Oosterbroek.

A documentary entitled The Death of Kevin Carter: Casualty of the Bang Bang Club (2004) was nominated for an Academy Award in 2006.

A documentary entitled When Under Fire: Shoot Back! premiered at the Denver Film Festival in November 2014.

== See also ==
- 1994 in South Africa
