= Five Fingers (2006 film) =

- DVD cover
- Directed by: Laurence Malkin
- Written by: Chad Thumann; Laurence Malkin
- Produced by: Laurence Fishburne; Dolly Hall
- Starring: Laurence Fishburne; Ryan Phillippe; Gina Torres; Touriya Haoud; Saïd Taghmaoui; Colm Meaney
- Cinematography: Alexander Gruszynski
- Edited by: Herman P. Koerts; Maureen Meulen
- Music by: Vernon Reid; Noah Agruss
- Production companies: 24fps Productions; Cinema Gypsy Productions; Element Films; Parabolic Pictures Inc.
- Distributed by: Lions Gate Films
- Release date: July 6, 2006
- Running time: 87 minutes
- Country: United States
- Language: English
- Box office: $352,089

Five Fingers is a 2006 American drama-thriller film directed by Laurence Malkin, and written by Chad Thumann and Malkin. The film had ten producers, including actor Laurence Fishburne, who stars in it alongside Ryan Phillippe, Gina Torres, Touriya Haoud, Saïd Taghmaoui and Colm Meaney. Five Fingers was filmed in the Netherlands, Morocco, and Louisiana in 2004.

== Plot ==
Martijn, a gifted Dutch jazz pianist, flies to Morocco to set up a food assistance program. When he arrives, however, he and his British-accented travel guide, Gavin, are quickly kidnapped by terrorists, taken to an undisclosed location, bound and blindfolded. The captors swiftly shoot Gavin and then begin methodical attempts to extract information from Martijn about where he obtained the money to set up the program by cutting off his fingers one at a time.

Martijn insists that he has no idea where the money came from, though in time it becomes clear that all is not what it seems. Martijn at first denies everything as he and his captor Ahmat begin to play a game of chess. Ahmat expresses his love for the game stating that there is no bluffing in chess but calculation. Martijn loses the second round and refusing to answer questions, loses his first finger. Later, a woman, Aicha, arrives to tend Martijn's wounds. As Martijn refuses to give up the names, he suspects Aicha being a part of the ruse and refuses to tell anything further. Aicha then cuts off Martijn's second finger as he refuses to tell the truth where the money came from.

Later, Martijn wakes up to find his hand strapped into a vice to prevent himself from escaping torture as Ahmat returns to give Martijn familiar information from newspapers such as Germany and Poland seeking a labor deal and six Palestinians killed in an airstrike by the Israeli Air Force so Martijn can be familiar with them. He then begins to present Martijn a theory that he is a CIA agent trying to find information on Hassan Fikri which Martijn denies after hearing a phone call of himself making an inquiry about Fikri's whereabouts. Still convinced that Martijn is lying, Aicha cut Martijn's third finger off as he refuses to give up the names of his friends and more of the information. The next day, Aicha offers kindness to Martijn by removing his soiled clothing and giving him a bath when he soils his own pants. As he is bathed, Martijn tells Aicha that he hates the CIA and tries to build common ground by stating that he is an idealist who wants to change the world, and that a dozen 9/11 attacks all over the world would have larger corporations begin effecting social change. Aicha accuses him of being trained by the CIA and threatens to take another finger if he is lying. Martijn allows her to cut off his index finger.

Whenever Martijn is tortured, several flashbacks show his happy life back home in the Netherlands with his girlfriend Saadia.

As the torture continues, Ahmat tries his hardest to get answers from Martijn. Eventually, Martijn reveals to Ahmat that he is, in fact, a terrorist and was going to poison fast food with bacteria, killing potentially thousands of Americans. To verify the information, Ahmat proposes they both write the names of the terrorist cell members on separate pieces of paper to see if they match. While Ahmat merely writes "Thank You" three times, Martijn writes the actual names of the operatives, confirming his involvement. After giving up the names of those within the Holland terrorist cell funding him for his alleged food program, Youseff, a man who had been filming Martijn, kills him. Ahmat is revealed to be a CIA agent and Gavin, still alive, is revealed to be an American who had been working with Ahmat the entire time. Ahmat and Aicha, revealed to be his girlfriend, go for a drink, showing the Statue of Liberty revealing they had been in New York City the entire time.

== Cast ==
- Laurence Fishburne as Ahmat, a terrorist revealed to be a CIA agent
- Ryan Phillippe as Martijn, a Dutchman and pianist who goes to Morocco to start a food charity, later revealed to be a terrorist of a cell whose true intentions are to poison fast food and kill thousands of Americans
- Gina Torres as Aicha, one of Ahmat's associates, later girlfriend. Torres is also Fishburne's ex-wife; this is the only movie she and her ex-husband starred in.
- Saïd Taghmaoui as Youseff, an associate of Ahmat
- Colm Meaney as Gavin, Martijn's travel guide, later revealed to be working with Ahmat
- Anton Sinke as The Donor
- Antonie Kamerling as Policeman
- Kimmosato as Neighbour
- Isa Hoes as Mother
- Merlijn Kamerling as Boy
- Delilah Van Eyck as Waitress
- Mimi Ferrer as Dutch Woman

== Reception ==
The film made virtually no money in its short run in theaters. On Rotten Tomatoes, the film has three positive reviews and one negative review. Jay Weissberg, from Variety gave the film a positive review saying, "As a lesson in how subtle acting styles can calm a highly pitched story, pic delivers the goods."
