= Steven Silver (film director) =

South African-Canadian film writer, director and producer

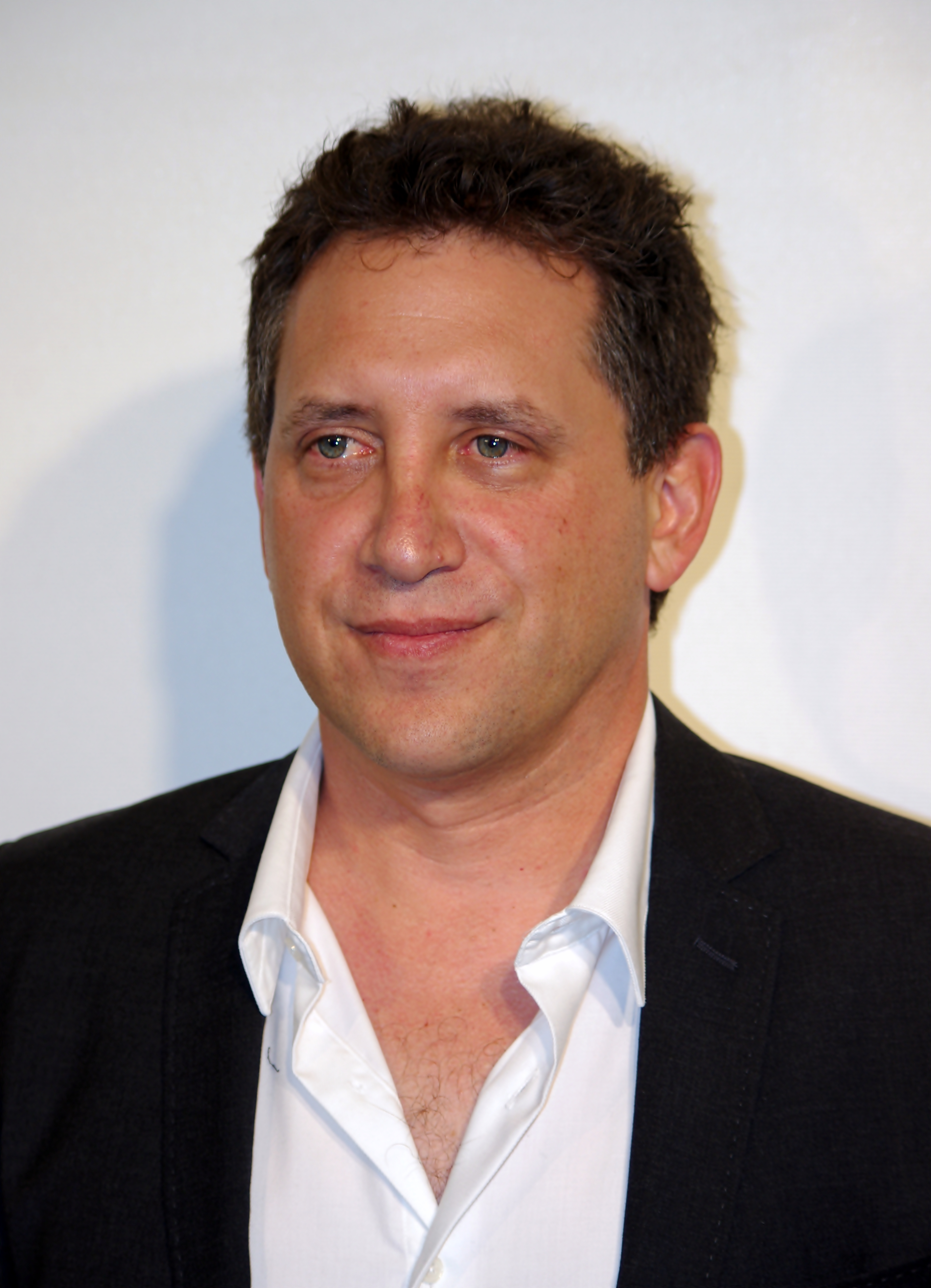
- Silver at the 2011 Tribeca Film Festival premiere of The Bang Bang Club
- Citizenship: South Africa
- Occupations: Film director, Film producer

Steven Silver is a South African / Canadian media entrepreneur, producer, and director. Together with media industry veteran Peter Sussman, Silver co-founded and was the CEO of Kew Media Group Inc., a publicly listed content company that produced and distributed multi-genre content worldwide.

== Early life and education ==
Silver was born and raised in South Africa. He earned his LL.B from the University of the Witwatersrand in Johannesburg. As a student, Silver was an anti-Apartheid activist during the 1990s.

== Career ==
He started his career in South Africa and later in Canada, writing and co-producing a feature-length 1997 Canadian Broadcasting Corporation (CBC) documentary Gerrie & Louise that earned him an International Emmy award. In addition to documentaries for the CBC, he also directed documentaries for PBS, History, and Discovery Channel. Silver's documentaries Diameter of the Bomb and the critically acclaimed The Last Just Man won a number of international awards. He collaborated with Barna-Alper Productions to produce Box Car Rebellion, Doctor's Strike, The Last Just Man, The Anglo Boer War, and The Dark Years.

With Neil Tabatznik, Silver is also partner and co-founder of Toronto-based Blue Ice Group Capital. In 2005, the duo bought into Barna Alper productions, at which Silver served as president from 2005 to 2009, when it was sold to Entertainment One. After the sale, Silver spent a year as head of eOne's factual entertainment division.

In 2010, the Blue Ice Group partnered with Echo Lake Entertainment to form the Blue Lake Media Fund. The fund provides financing for mid- to large-budget independent films and television series. In 2011, the Blue Ice Group acquired the South African production company Out of Africa, and with the owner Lance Samuels established Blue Ice Pictures. Blue Ice Group is also responsible for a number of philanthropic initiatives including the Hot Docs–Blue Ice Group Documentary fund, which provides financial support to African documentary filmmakers for development and production.

His most recent film for which he also wrote the screenplay is a Canadian–South African long feature film entitled The Bang-Bang Club based on the book The Bang-Bang Club: Snapshots from a Hidden War co-written by Greg Marinovich and João Silva who were part of the group of four photographers in South Africa known as Bang-Bang Club, the other two members being Kevin Carter and Ken Oosterbroek. The film premiered at the Toronto International Film Festival.

More recently, he has executive produced a number of films including Truth, Indian Point, and Midnight's Children.

Amid mounting debt and a pending court case, Kew Media Group dissolved in February 2020. FTI Consulting, a Toronto-based business management firm, took control of the company's assets and the board of directors resigned, including Silver.

== Filmography ==
=== Director ===
- 2002: Stories from the War Zone (TV documentary)
- 2002: Soul of India (TV documentary) – Part of Wide Angle series
- 2002: The Last Just Man (documentary)
- 2003: The Great Atlantic Air Race (TV documentary)
- 2005: Diameter of the Bomb (documentary)
- 2005: H5N1: Killer Flu – Part of Wide Angle series
- 2007: The Dark Years (TV mini-series)
- 2010: The Bang-Bang Club – First directed long feature film

=== Writer ===
- 1997: Gerrie & Louise (documentary)
- 2003: The Great Atlantic Air Race (TV documentary)
- 2010: The Bang-Bang Club (screenplay / writer)

=== Producer ===
- 1997: Gerrie & Louise (documentary) (co-producer)
- 2002: Soul of India (TV documentary) – Part of Wide Angle series
- 2005: H5N1: Killer Flu – Part of Wide Angle series
- 2007: Shake Hands with the Devil (executive producer)
- 2007: Who Do You Think You Are? (TV series) (executive producer)
- 2007: Party Mamas (TV series) (executive producer – 6 episodes: "Emily", "Rosalie", "Angel", "Suzanne" and "Bridget")
- 2008: Céline (TV movie) (executive producer)
- 2009: Bio-Dad (TV documentary) (executive producer)
- 2009: Ted Rogers: A Life in Broadcasting (TV movie) (executive producer)
- 2009: Almost Audrey (TV movie) (executive producer)
- 2010: Force of Nature: The David Suzuki Movie (documentary) (executive producer)
- 2010: The Bang-Bang Club (executive producer)
- 2010: Flip, Flop, and Fly, 40 Years of the Downchild Blues Band (documentary) (executive producer)
- 2010: Pickton (TV documentary) (executive producer)
- 2011: The Pig Farm
- 2012: Midnight's Children (executive producer)
- 2013: The Numbers Station (executive producer)
- 2013: Romeo & Juliet (executive producer)
- 2015: Shark Killer (executive producer)
- 2015: Indian Point (executive producer)
- 2015: The Missing Ingredient: What is the Recipe for Success? (executive producer)
- 2015: Truth (executive producer)
- 2016: Madiba (TV Mini-Series) (executive producer)

== Awards and nominations ==
For Gerrie & Louise

- 1998: Won Gemini Award for "Best Writing in a Documentary Program or Series" (shared with Barry Stevens)
- 1998: Won Writers Guild of Canada Award (shared with Barry Stevens)

For The Last Just Men

- 2002: Won "Best Documentary Film/Video" at Hamptons International Film Festival
- 2002: Won "Humanitarian Cinema Award" at Newport International Film Festival Award
- 2003: Won both "Audience Award" and "Special Jury Award" at the Prague One World Film Festival

Others

- 2006: Won "Silver Screen Award: Documentaries" U.S. International Film and Video Festival for "Wide Angle" "H5N1: Killer Flu" (Shared with Micah Fink)
- 2008: Nominated for Gemini Award for "Best Direction in a Documentary Series" and for "Best Documentary Series" for The Dark Years
- 2009: Nominated for Gemini Award for "Best TV movie" for Céline (shared with Laszlo Barna)
