= Ryan Phillippe =

American actor (born 1974)

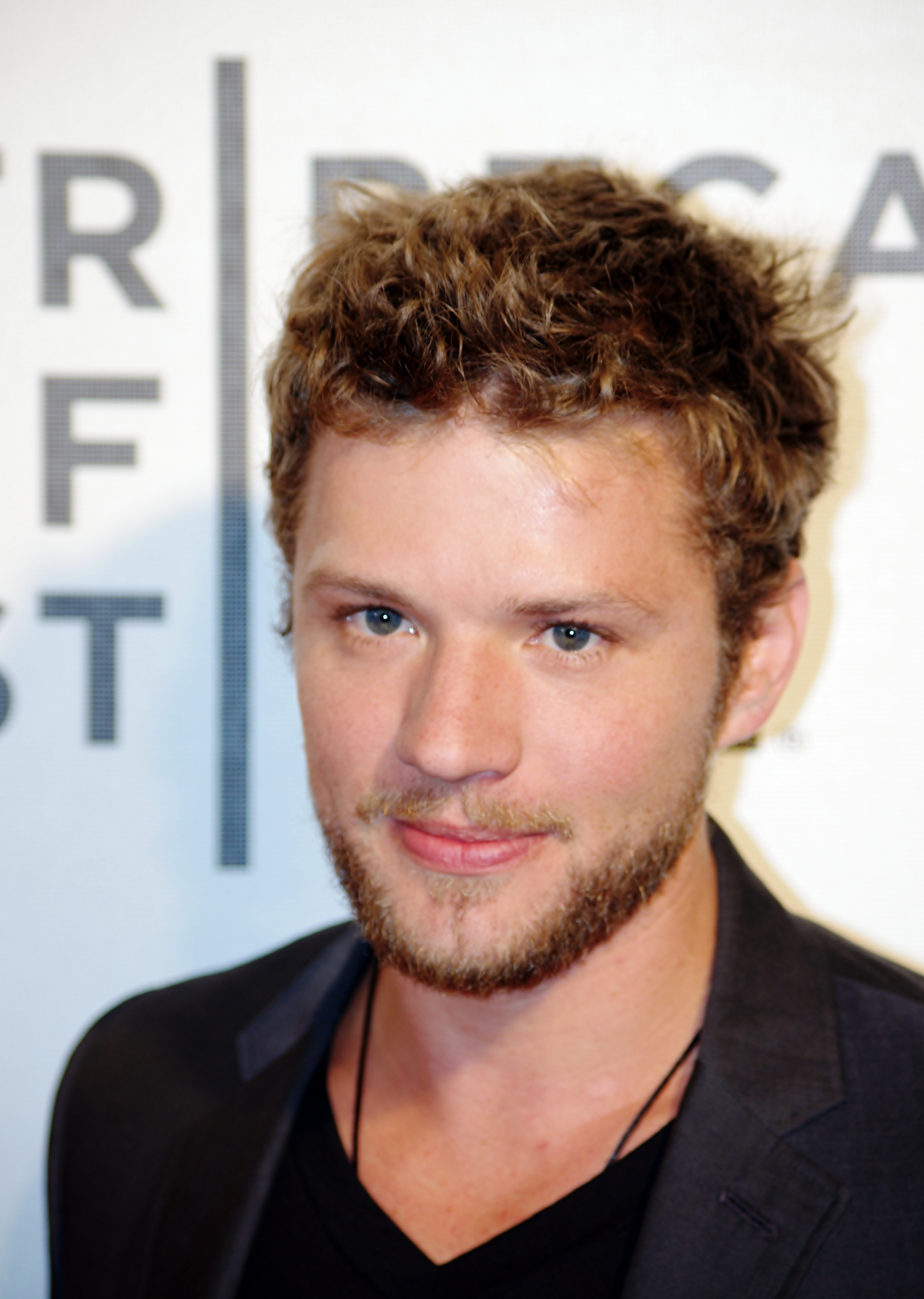
- Phillippe in 2011
- Born: Matthew Ryan Phillippe; September 10, 1974 (age 52); New Castle, Delaware, U.S.
- Occupation: Actor
- Years active: 1992–present
- Spouse: Reese Witherspoon (m. 1999; div. 2007)
- Children: 3

Matthew Ryan Phillippe (/ˈfɪlɪpi/ FIL-ip-ee; born September 10, 1974) is an American actor. After appearing as Billy Douglas on the soap opera One Life to Live (1992–1993) and making his feature film debut in Crimson Tide (1995), he came to prominence in the late 1990s with starring roles in I Know What You Did Last Summer (1997), 54 (1998), Playing by Heart (1998), and Cruel Intentions (1999).

Throughout the 2000s and beyond, Phillippe took on a range of parts in films such as The Way of the Gun (2000), Antitrust (2001), Gosford Park (2001), Igby Goes Down (2002), The I Inside (2003), Crash (2004), Flags of Our Fathers (2006), Breach (2007), Stop-Loss (2008), MacGruber (2010), The Bang Bang Club (2010), and The Lincoln Lawyer (2011).

Outside of film, Phillippe appeared in the lead role of Bob Lee Swagger on USA Network's Shooter (2016–2018) and reprised his portrayal of Dixon Piper in the Peacock adaptation of MacGruber (2021).

== Early life ==
Phillippe was born in New Castle, Delaware. His mother, Susan, ran a day care center in the family's house; his father, Richard Phillippe, was a chemist. Phillippe has three sisters, and is of part French descent. He graduated from Barbizon in Wilmington, Delaware.

Phillippe earned a black belt in taekwondo in his youth.

== Career ==
=== Early career (1990–1996) ===
Phillippe's acting career began after being signed to Cathy Parker Management in Voorhees, New Jersey. Shortly after, he made an appearance in the ABC daytime drama One Life to Live. His character, Billy Douglas, whom he played from 1992 to 1993, was the first gay teenager on a daytime soap opera. After leaving the show, Phillippe moved to Los Angeles, where he appeared in a number of small parts in various television series including Matlock, Due South, the TV miniseries The Secrets of Lake Success, and movies, including the 1995 film Crimson Tide and the 1996 film White Squall.

=== Rise to prominence (1997–2001) ===
He was cast in the 1997 horror film, I Know What You Did Last Summer. The film was a success and led to Phillippe gaining wider renown and being cast in a few more high-profile films, including 54 and Playing by Heart in 1998. In 1999, he starred in Cruel Intentions, a modern retelling of the Choderlos de Laclos novel Les Liaisons dangereuses, which also starred Phillippe's future wife, Reese Witherspoon. It was a success among its intended teenage audience, cementing Phillippe's ability to play characters that require sex appeal. Phillippe can also be seen in the Marcy Playground music video "Comin' Up From Behind", which appears on the film's soundtrack. In the years following, he appeared in the crime drama The Way of the Gun, starred as a famed software engineer in the thriller Antitrust, and co-starred in Robert Altman's Gosford Park, which was nominated for the Oscar for Best Picture.

=== Critical success and later work (2002–2011) ===
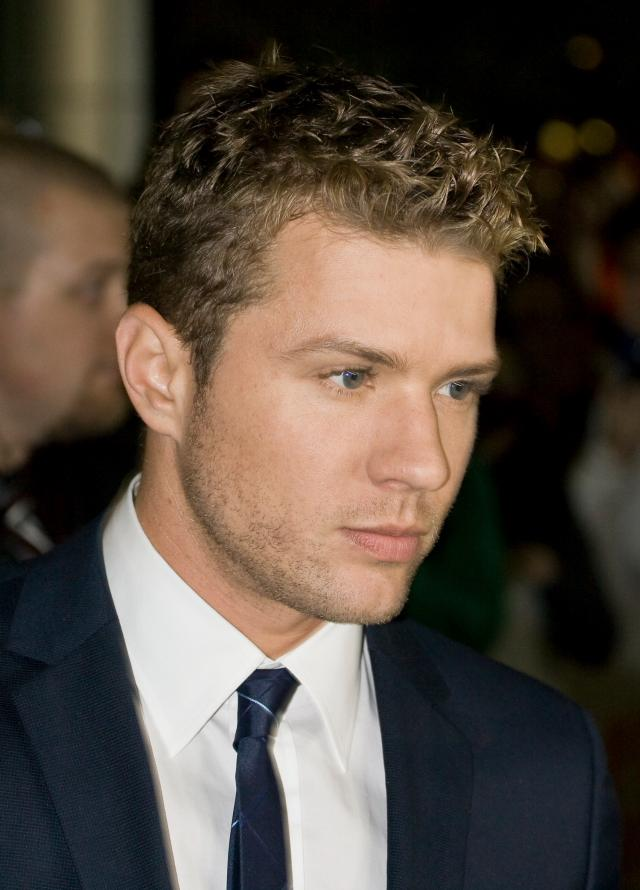
Phillippe at the 2010 Toronto International Film Festival

Phillippe had supporting parts in the films Igby Goes Down (2002) and Crash (2005), which won the Best Picture Oscar. His 2003 film The I Inside premiered on cable. In 2006, Phillippe played real-life Navy corpsman John Bradley in the war film Flags of Our Fathers, directed by Clint Eastwood and following the journey of the United States Marines who lifted the flag at the Battle of Iwo Jima. Phillippe has said that the film was the "best experience" of his career because of its "personal meaning" to him and that he would have "given [his] life" to fight in World War II, noting that both of his grandfathers fought in the war. His performance was positively received by film critic Richard Roeper, who thought it was Phillippe's best to date. Phillippe's next role was in the thriller Breach, in which he played FBI investigator Eric O'Neill opposite Chris Cooper. He has since commented that he believes Cooper to be "the best actor America has to offer". He then starred in Chaos, in which he plays a police officer; Five Fingers, a drama set in Morocco; Kimberly Peirce's Iraq war film Stop-Loss; and the futuristic Franklyn.

Next up for Phillippe was a rare comedic role as Lt. Dixon Piper in MacGruber, a film based on the Saturday Night Live (SNL) skit of the same name. It was released in the U.S. and Canada on May 21, 2010. As part of the film's promotion, Phillippe made his SNL hosting debut on April 17, 2010. Two days later, on April 19, 2010, Phillippe co-hosted WWE Raw, also in support of MacGruber. That same year, Phillippe starred in the Canadian and South African production The Bang-Bang Club, which tells the real-life story of the Bang-Bang Club, four South African photographers whose images documented the bloody end of apartheid. Phillippe stars as Pulitzer Prize-winning photographer Greg Marinovich. Filming for the movie took place in South Africa beginning in March 2009. Phillippe described the filming process as "really run-and-gun. There were no comforts, and I actually appreciate that." He noted that the experience affected him, explaining that "we were shooting during the day in Soweto, and it was an endless procession of funerals — death is so common. Kids there have no quality of life. It has made me want to get more involved in Africa-based charities." An early cut of the film was shown at Cannes Film Festival in May 2009, with the final version shown at Cannes in May 2010. The film officially premiered in September 2010 at the 2010 Toronto International Film Festival. The U.S. rights to the movie were picked up by Tribeca Film, which premiered the movie at the 2011 Tribeca Film Festival and opened it in limited release on April 22, 2011.

In mid-2010, Phillippe began filming the adaptation of popular crime novel The Lincoln Lawyer, taking on the role of Louis Roulet, a wealthy Los Angeles playboy accused of a crime for which his culpability is unclear. The movie opened on March 18, 2011, and was generally well received by critics, scoring 82% on Rotten Tomatoes as of late March 2011. Phillippe filmed his next project, the heist action film Setup, in December 2010 in Grand Rapids, Michigan. The movie focuses on a group of young men from Detroit whose attempt at a diamond heist goes awry and brings them into conflict with a mob boss. The movie had a straight-to-DVD release on September 20, 2011. Phillippe next filmed the dramatic dark comedy Revenge for Jolly! in mid-2011. The movie, which tells the story of a man set on finding his dog's murderer, premiered at the 2012 Tribeca Film Festival. Phillippe subsequently began work on another movie, Straight A's, in August 2011. Filmed in Shreveport, Louisiana, it stars Phillippe as a man who has been in and out of rehab for years and is now haunted by his mother's ghost.

=== Return to television and focus on directing and producing (2012–present) ===
Starting in November 2011, Phillippe spent several months filming a 10-episode arc on the fifth and final season of the critically acclaimed TV show Damages. Playing Channing McClaren, a Julian Assange–like character, it was his first regular TV role since his breakout part on One Life to Live. The season aired from July to September 2012. In 2012, Phillippe focused on his directorial debut, Catch Hell, an indie thriller in which Phillippe stars as a fading film actor who must devise a creative escape after he is kidnapped and tortured while making a movie in Shreveport, Louisiana. In addition to directing, co-producing, and starring in the film, Phillippe co-wrote the script with Joe Gossett. Phillippe has said that the film is based partly on his and his friends's life experiences (including the filming of Straight A's in Shreveport in 2011) but is partly meant to be "a fun scary movie in the vein of Misery". Filming took place on location in Shreveport in the fourth quarter of 2012. The movie was released on October 10, 2014.

In October 2013, Phillippe began filming the action thriller Reclaim in Puerto Rico. The movie features Phillippe as an American man who travels to Puerto Rico with his wife to adopt an orphan from Haiti. After a confrontation with a local, the child vanishes. Reclaim was released on September 19, 2014. In May 2014, ABC picked up the pilot for Secrets and Lies, which was shot in Charlotte, North Carolina, in early 2014. The 10-episode mystery series debuted on March 1, 2015, as a midseason entry during the 2014–15 U.S. television season. It is based on the Australian series of the same name, with Phillippe playing a family man who becomes a prime murder suspect after he discovers the body of a child. Phillippe was also attached to a number of possible future film roles, including Chronicle, a film that was to have been directed by Jay Alaimo that would have seen him in a story "about two childhood friends who reunite to launch the biggest marijuana dealership in New York City".

Phillippe, Breckin Meyer, Seth Green, and David E. Siegal run a production company called Lucid Films. In 2010, Phillippe and Meyer began "getting a show going for Showtime", serving as executive producers. The comedy, Heavy and Rolling, tells the story of a Manhattan towncar driver who assumes different identities as he moves towards madness. Phillippe also served as executive producer and narrator on Isolated, a documentary that follows five surfers as they travel to remote New Guinea in search of untouched waves. The documentary premiered in January 2013 at the 2013 Santa Barbara International Film Festival.

In 2015, Phillippe was cast in the lead role of Bob Lee Swagger on the USA Network thriller drama series Shooter, which premiered in November 2016. In February 2020, Phillippe was announced in the role of Cody Hoyt in the ABC crime drama series Big Sky, which was created by David E. Kelley. In 2021, Phillipe starred in One Shot, a British action thriller film directed by James Nunn.

== Personal life ==
In 1997, Phillippe met actress Reese Witherspoon at a party for her 21st birthday. The following year, the pair starred together in Cruel Intentions. Phillippe and Witherspoon, who was six months pregnant, married on June 5, 1999, in a small ceremony at the Old Wide Awake Plantation near Charleston, South Carolina. Their daughter was born in 1999 and their son was born in 2003. On October 30, 2006, Phillippe and Witherspoon released a statement announcing that they were formally separating. Witherspoon filed for divorce on November 8, 2006, citing irreconcilable differences as the cause. In light of the couple's lack of a prenuptial agreement, she requested that the court refuse to grant spousal support to Phillippe and asked for joint legal custody and sole physical custody of the pair's two children. Phillippe filed for joint physical custody of the children on May 15, 2007, and did not seek any spousal support. The couple's marriage officially ended on October 5, 2007, with final divorce arrangements settled on June 13, 2008, according to court documents. Phillippe and Witherspoon shared joint custody of their children.

Phillippe began dating model and actress Alexis Knapp in May 2010; they ended their relationship in September that same year. After their breakup, Knapp discovered that she was pregnant by Phillippe and gave birth to a daughter in 2011. Phillippe began dating law student Paulina Slagter in 2011. They became engaged in 2015 but ended their relationship in 2016. In March 2017, Slagter filed a harassment report with the LAPD after Phillippe had been harassing her via text messages. In September 2017, Elsie Hewitt, an ex-girlfriend of Phillippe, filed a lawsuit against him for allegedly punching her, kicking her, and throwing her down stairs. Hewitt was granted an Emergency Protective Order by the LAPD stating Phillippe could not come within 100 yards (91 m) of her. In October 2019, the case was settled.

== Filmography ==
=== Film ===
Year	Title	Role	Notes
1995	Crimson Tide	Seaman Grattam	
1996	Lifeform	Private Ryan	
1996	White Squall	Gil Martin	
1997	I Know What You Did Last Summer	Barry William Cox	
1997	Little Boy Blue	Jimmy West	
1997	Nowhere	Shad	
1998	54	Shane O'Shea	
1998	Homegrown	Harlan Dykstra	
1998	Playing by Heart	Keenan	
1999	Cruel Intentions	Sebastian Valmont	
2000	Company Man	Rudolph Petrov	
2000	The Way of the Gun	Parker	
2001	Antitrust	Milo Hoffman	
2001	Gosford Park	Henry Denton	
2002	Igby Goes Down	Ollie Slocumb	
2004	Crash	Tommy Hansen	
2005	Chaos	Shane Dekker	
2006	Five Fingers	Martijn	
2006	Flags of Our Fathers	John "Doc" Bradley	
2007	Breach	Eric O'Neill	
2008	Stop-Loss	Brandon Leonard King	
2008	Franklyn	Jonathan Preest / David Esser	
2010	MacGruber	Dixon Piper	
2010	The Bang Bang Club	Greg Marinovich	
2011	The Lincoln Lawyer	Louis Roulet	
2011	Revenge for Jolly!	Everett Bachmeier	
2011	Setup	Vincent	
2013	Straight A's	Scott	
2014	Catch Hell	Reagan Pearce	Also writer, director and producer
2014	Reclaim	Steven Mayer	
2015	Return to Sender	UPS delivery guy	Cameo
2017	Wish Upon	Jonathan Shannon	
2020	Brothers by Blood	Charley Flood	
2020	The 2nd	Major Victor Marvin "Vic" Davis	Also producer
2021	Lady of the Manor	Tanner Wadsworth	
2021	One Shot	Jack Yorke	
2022	American Murderer	Lance Leising	
2022	Collide	Hunter	
2022	Summit Fever	Leo	
2023	The Locksmith	Miller Graham	
2023	Miranda's Victim	John J. Flynn	
2024	Prey	Andrew	
2024	Saint Clare	Timmons	
2026	One Mile	Danny Beckett	Also producer
2026	The Patient	The Patient	

=== Television ===
Year	Title	Role	Notes
1992–1993	One Life to Live	Billy Douglas	
1993	The Secrets of Lake Success	Stew Atkins	Miniseries
1994	The Case of the Grimacing Governor	Robert Fowler	Television film
1994	Due South	Del Porter	Episode: "The Gift of the Wheelman"
1994	Matlock	Michael	Episode: "The Scandal"
1995	Deadly Invasion: The Killer Bee Nightmare	Tom Redman	Television film
1996	Chicago Hope	David Holgren	Episode: "Women on the Verge"
1996	The Outer Limits	Rusty Dobson	Episode: "Straight and Narrow"
2000	King of the Hill	Wally	Voice; episode: "Twas the Nut Before Christmas"
2003	The I Inside	Simon Cable	Television film
2010	Nick Swardson's Pretend Time	Handsome guy	Episode: "Powdered Doughnuts Make Me Go Nuts"
2010	Saturday Night Live	Himself / various characters	Episode: "Ryan Phillippe / Ke$ha"
2010	WWE Raw	Dixon Piper	1 episode
2012	Damages	Channing McClaren	Main role (season 5)
2012, 2014	The Eric Andre Show	Himself	Episodes: "Ryan Phillippe", "Naturi Naughton; Ryan Philippe"
2014	Men at Work	Himself	Episode: "I Take Thee, Gibbs"
2015	Drunk History	Benjamin Ignatius Hayes	Episode: "Los Angeles"
2015	Robot Chicken	George Taylor / Reggie Mantle / Trevor's Dad	Voice; episode: "Cake Pillow"
2015	Secrets and Lies	Ben Crawford	Main role (season 1)
2016–2018	Shooter	Bob Lee Swagger	Main role; also producer
2016	SmackDown Live	Himself	1 episode
2017	Brooklyn Nine-Nine	Milton Boyle	Episode: "The Bank Job"
2017	Famous in Love	Himself	Episode: "Fifty Shades of Red"
2019	Historical Roasts	Julius Caesar	Episode: "Cleopatra"
2020	Big Sky	Cody Hoyt	Main role (season 1)
2020	Will & Grace	Himself	Episode: "Bi-Plane"
2021	MacGruber	Dixon Piper	Main role
2022	I Love That for You	Himself	Episodes: "Point of No Returns", "Shop Cancer's Ass"
2025	Motorheads	Logan	Main role
2026	9-1-1: Nashville	Rogue Kelly	Main role (season 2)

=== Music videos ===
Year	Title	Artist	Role
1999	"Comin' Up from Behind"	Marcy Playground	
1999	"Every You Every Me"	Placebo	
2004	"Hey Ya!"	Outkast	TV host
2023	"The Most Wanted Person in the United States"	100 gecs	Store employee

== Accolades ==
Year	Group	Award	Work	Result
1998	Blockbuster Entertainment Awards	Favorite Supporting Actor: Horror	I Know What You Did Last Summer	Nominated
1999	Golden Raspberry Awards	Worst Actor	54	Nominated
1999	Teen Choice Awards	Film – Choice Actor	Cruel Intentions	Nominated
1999	Teen Choice Awards	Film – Sexiest Love Scene (Shared with Reese Witherspoon)	Cruel Intentions	Nominated
2000	MTV Movie Awards	Best Male Performance	Cruel Intentions	Nominated
2000	Golden Slate (Hungary)	Best Actor in a Leading Role	54	Nominated
2001	Teen Choice Awards	Film – Choice Actor	Antitrust	Nominated
2002	Critics Choice Awards	Best Acting Ensemble	Gosford Park	Won
2002	Florida Film Critics Circle Awards	Best Ensemble Cast	Gosford Park	Won
2002	Online Film Critics Society Awards	Best Ensemble	Gosford Park	Won
2002	Phoenix Film Critics Society Awards	Best Acting Ensemble	Gosford Park	Nominated
2002	Satellite Awards	Outstanding Motion Picture Ensemble	Gosford Park	Won
2002	Screen Actors Guild Awards	Outstanding Performance by a Cast of a Theatrical Motion Picture	Gosford Park	Won
2005	Gotham Awards	Best Ensemble Cast	Crash	Nominated
2006	Black Reel Awards	Best Ensemble	Crash	Won
2006	Screen Actors Guild Awards	Outstanding Performance by a Cast in a Motion Picture	Crash	Won
2008	Teen Choice Awards	Choice Movie Actor: Drama	Stop-Loss	Nominated
2009	Prism Awards	Performance in a Feature Film	Stop-Loss	Nominated
