= The Last Just Man =

The Last Just Man is a documentary film that details the events that led to the slaughter of 800,000 people in a 100 days genocide in 1994 in Rwanda. It is dominated by the account of the head of the U.N. peace keeping mission in Rwanda, Brigadier General Romeo Dellaire, a Canadian who bore witness to those atrocities and wished he stopped them. It was directed by Steven Silver.

== Awards ==
- 17th Gemini Awards: Best History Documentary Program
- 17th Gemini Awards: Best Direction in a Documentary Program
- 17th Gemini Awards: Best Writing in a Documentary Program or Series

== Festivals ==
- Full Frame Documentary Film Festival
- Chicago International Film Festival
- Film Festival Cologne
