= Africa Media Online =

Africa Media Online is an organisation that enables African media professionals to reach international markets. Based in Pietermaritzburg, South Africa, the organisation provides online media library systems, professional digitisation services, digital imaging training, and access to a worldwide audience through their image library, previously known as africanpictures.net.

== Stock photo library ==
The image library represents individual African photographers, including the likes of the internationally acclaimed Guy Tillim, Greg Marinovich and David Goldblatt, as well as acts as an aggregator of content by representing other photographic and heritage agencies such as South Photographs, Baileys African History Archive and Shuter & Shooter Publishers. Until late 2008 all stock photography was sold on a Rights Managed basis. Now the organisation has launched a series of Royalty Free collections in which all images are model-released and available for multiple usages, including advertising, for a single fee.

== Software platforms ==
Africa Media Online’s online picture library management and sales system, called MEMAT (Media Market Technologies), is used by organisations and professional photographers to display their collections of high resolution images on a website (in some instances for purchase) in a secure way. Initially designed only to showcase photographs, the new version to be released in 2009, will feature sound files, digital video files, text, graphics and multimedia.

== Ownership ==
Africa Media Online (Pty) Ltd. is a black owned company, defined by the South African Department of Trade and Industry as an HDI, and is a Level 3 Black Economic Empowerment Contributor. The organisation also owns Digitise Africa, a high-end digitisation service geared at putting African photographic collections online. The company has established a not-for-profit trust, the independent Digitise Africa Trust, in order to raise funds for training African professionals and digitising African collections.

== Partnership projects ==
The African Image Pipeline (AIP) project was made possible with 70% grant funding from the European Union through Gijima KwaZulu-Natal, launches EU funded African Image Pipeline project an initiative of South Africa's Department of Economic Development. The African Image Pipeline enables the organisation to train photographers from historically disadvantaged backgrounds; digitise 32 000 images from photographers and the heritage sector; upgrade the MEMAT online media library system; translate the African Archival Thesaurus, which allows images to be searched, into the major trade languages of Africa; and gain greater penetration into global media markets.

Twenty Ten is a project for professional print journalists, photojournalists and radio journalists of African nationality and currently living in Africa. A project between the World Press Photo Foundation, Freevoice and Lokaalmondiaal, and sponsored by the Dutch Postcode Lottery, it aimed to encourage media professionals to creatively produce and distribute articles, images, broadcasts and multimedia productions related to African football ahead of the FIFA World Cup held in South Africa in 2010.
