= Operation Lifeline Sudan =

1989-2005 humanitarian assistance operation in Sudan

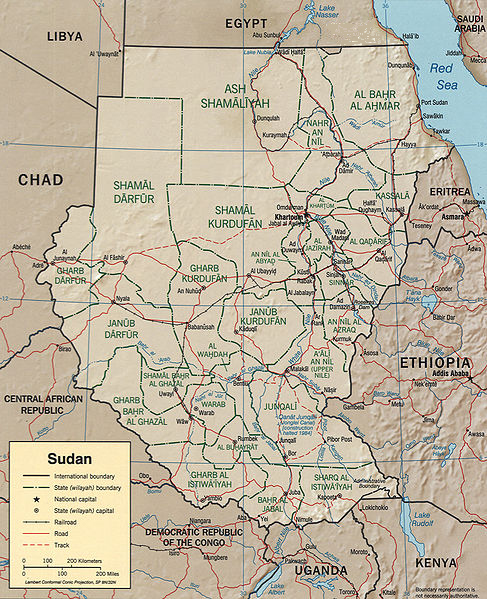
A political map of Sudan

Operation Lifeline Sudan (OLS) was a consortium of United Nations agencies (mainly UNICEF and the World Food Programme) and approximately 35 non-governmental organizations operating in southern Sudan to provide humanitarian assistance throughout war-torn and drought-afflicted regions in the South. Operation Lifeline Sudan was established in April 1989 in response to a devastating war-induced famine and other humanitarian consequences of the Second Sudanese Civil War between the Sudanese government and South Sudanese rebels. It was the result of negotiations between the UN, the Government of Sudan and the Sudan People's Liberation Movement/Army (SPLM/A) to deliver humanitarian assistance to all civilians in need, regardless of their location or political affiliation. This included over 100,000 returnees from Itang in Ethiopia in 1991. Lokichogio was the primary forward operations hub for OLS.

This mission lasted until the conclusion of the Second Sudanese Civil War with the signing of the 2005 Comprehensive Peace Agreement. It is unique in being the first instance of the UN dealing with a non-state actor like the SPLM/A in order to negotiate the distribution of humanitarian aid within a conflict zone.

== Background ==
As a result of the breakdown of various provisions of the 1972 Addis Ababa agreement that ended the First Sudanese Civil War breaking down, the Second Sudanese Civil War erupted between the Sudanese government and the SPLM/A. This conflict, alongside massive famine and socioeconomic instability, led to over 2 million casualties. An additional 5 million people became internally-displaced individuals while over 500,000 more fled to neighboring countries as refugees. Subsequently, what has been characterized by the UN as a complex emergency emerged due to the large number of civilian casualties, the failure of the state and economy, and an increase in security threats to any potential humanitarian interventions. The increasing spillover from the conflict onto other countries in the form of refugees as well as increasing media coverage of the growing crisis led to a call for organizations like the UN to intervene and provide humanitarian assistance.

=== Failure of Operation Rainbow ===
The first of these UN interventions, dubbed Operation Rainbow, was launched in 1986 with the support of several donor governments and under the management of the World Food Programme (WFP). It aimed to use planes to fly relief packages to areas that were particularly devastated by the conflict. UN officials believed that a "food neutral program" where food aid would be equally provided to both the Sudanese government and the SPLM/A would be the most effective at mitigating the effects of the crisis. One of the first tests of this neutral model came with the attempted concurrent distribution of aid to the SPLM/A held city of Yirol and the government held city of Wau. But, the Sudanese government, fearing negative international media attention because of the dire state of affairs in Wau, rejected the plan, causing UN officials to backtrack their distribution of aid to Yirol due to fears of losing their credibility as a neutral humanitarian actor. This failure was compounded by the Sudanese government under Sadiq al-Mahdi declaring that they would not be able to guarantee the security of airports in the south of Sudan where the UN and non-governmental organizations would need to fly in to distribute aid. The Sadiq government, citing concerns amid frustration with perceived overbearing attitude of the UN and WFP officials involved in the effort, declared that they would no longer support the equal distribution of food to both it and the SPLM/A. The SPLM/A began to similarly opposed the principle of food neutral aid and formed their own humanitarian organization known as the Southern Relief and Rehabilitation Association (SRRA). Amidst this rejection by both parties, international actors lost interest and viewed the operation as a publicity stunt that failed to consider sovereignty.

== Creation ==
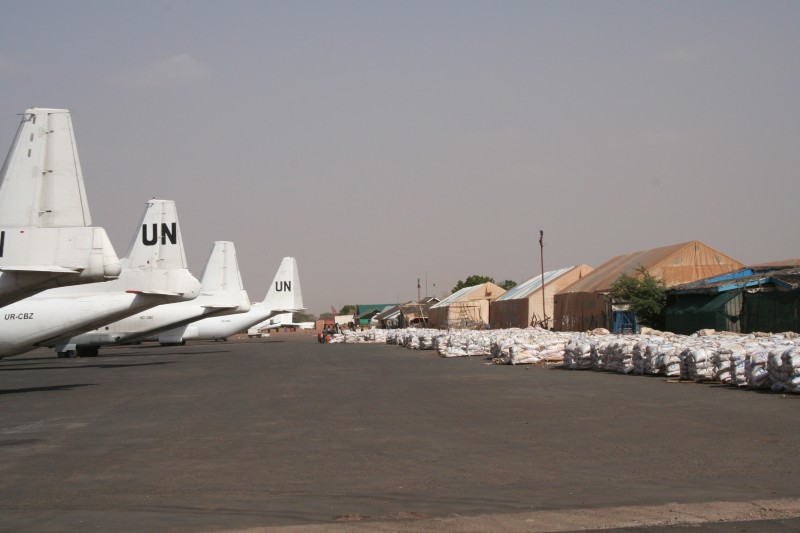
Planes used by Operation Lifeline Sudan to airdrop humanitarian aid

Operation Lifeline Sudan was created in 1989 under a unique combination of circumstances that led a convergence of international attention alongside an openness to cooperation by both the Sudanese Government and the SPLM/A. In 1988, severe flooding and famine in Khartoum led to massive international media coverage of the ongoing crisis in the region. Additionally, by this point, both the Sudanese Government and the SPLM/A had begun to make moves towards peace. This movement was supported by a newly supportive United States under the administration of George H.W. Bush. This alignment of interests was intensified by international frustration over continued suffering, as well as the diplomatic hostility shown towards international parties under Operation Rainbow. Consequently, a 1989 conference dedicated to relief operations was held in Khartoum, leading to an agreement that Operation Lifeline Sudan would a UN "umbrella organization" that would grant both diplomatic legitimacy and operational capacity to humanitarian aid distributed to both sides of the Second Sudanese Civil War. Central to this agreement was the principle that "corridors of tranquility" would allow for the safe transportation and impartial distribution of essential food aid through either the air or through roads. This new humanitarian intervention, made with the agreement of both Sudan and rebel factions in the south, was noteworthy in its guarantee of passages through which humanitarian aid could be delivered in a neutral manner without being disrupted by armed combatants

== Structure and mandate ==
Operation Lifeline Sudan had three explicit provisions that it was mandated to focus on by its agreement:

1. The UN would be the primary negotiator with all relevant parties whose territory that it either transported or delivered humanitarian aid in.
2. All relevant parties would respect and not hinder the delivery or transportation of humanitarian aid to populations in crisis.
3. The UN would remain neutral and would be responsible for coordinating OLS with all relevant parties involved in the conflict.

Alongside these provisions, OLS was logistically divided into Northern and Southern sectors that would respectively focus on the northern and southern parts of the conflict region in Sudan. The Northern sector of Operation Lifeline Sudan was noted to have coordinated extensively with the Sudanese government in Khartoum. This cooperation led to this sector prioritizing the delivery of aid to internally-displaced individuals that had gathered around the capital of Khartoum. It also led to this sector undertaking operations that were substantively aligned with the development priorities of the Sudanese government. Consequently, the Northern sector of OLS was significantly more intertwined with the government's interests and regulations, leading it to be less independent and more stagnant. Conversely, the Southern sector of Operation Lifeline Sudan was defined by its cooperation with the Sudan People's Liberation Movement/Army. Because the SPLM/A and its regional allies were non-state actors, OLS was not constrained by international norms surrounding sovereignty which dictated that interventions like it would usually operate in deference to the domestic government. This led to the Southern sector becoming more independent, allowing it to focus more on distributing humanitarian aid. The Southern sector of OLS was also able to use its provision as a negotiator to act as a conflict mediator.

== Legacy ==
Operation Lifeline Sudan has been noted to have been highly successful in delivering humanitarian aid in a conflict region. This is especially significant given that it was the first instance of the UN negotiating with a non-state actor like the SPLM/A alongside a state actor like the Sudanese government to neutrally distribute aid. These negotiations pioneered the creation of a rules-based humanitarian space in which aid could be distributed without fear of interference by parties on either side of the conflict. It has also been noted that OLS was crucial in creating an environment in which the SPLM/A and the Sudanese government could begin preliminary peace negotiations. This is because it created common humanitarian ground that allowed both parties to slowly build trust.

However, Operation Lifeline Sudan also experienced difficulty in facilitating the delivery of humanitarian aid when parties did not respect its mandate. This difficulty was made worse by the fluidity of the Second Sudanese Civil War, as the priorities of both the government and southern rebel factions shifted with the development of the conflict, creating an environment where OLS was vulnerable to the interests of the parties that it was negotiating with. Additionally, many have suggested that Operation Lifeline Sudan prolonged the conflict by legitimizing the SPLM/A and other rebel factions through both negotiating with them and through providing them with aid. This is driven by the concern that aid may be channeled into supporting the military.
