= South Sudan Relief and Rehabilitation Commission =

Agency of the Government of South Sudan

South Sudan's Relief and Rehabilitation Commission (RRC)
Commission overview
- Formed: 1983, but reconstituted in 2011
- Jurisdiction: South Sudan
- Headquarters: Juba
- Commission executives: Duer Tut Duel, Chairperson; Deputy Chairperson, Aguek Ring Mabil

The South Sudan's Relief and Rehabilitation Commission (RRC) is an agency of the Government of South Sudan. It is the operational arm of the Ministry of Humanitarian Affairs and Disaster Management.

The RRC in coordination with the IOM and UNOCHA is responsible for resettling internally displaced persons in South Sudan.

== Pre-Independence ==
Before independence the RRC existed as the Sudan SRRA, or SRRC. This organization was an organ of the SPLM and had the authority to issue travel documents. The SRRC was initially titled the Sudan Relief and Rehabilitation Agency, or SRRA, and changed its name after it merged with its rival, the Relief Association for South Sudan (RASS), a unit of Riek Machar's militias from 1991 to 2003, initially SPLA-Nasir/United and later SSIM/A, SSDF, SPDF.
