= Kongor =

Kongor Kongor
- Village
- Location in South Sudan
- Coordinates: 7.155293°N 31.354669°E
- Country: South Sudan
- Region: Greater Upper Nile
- State: Jonglei State
- County: Twic East County
- Elevation: 2,215 ft (675 m)
- Time zone: UTC+2 (CAT)
- Climate: Aw

Kongor is a community in the Kongor Payam of the Twic East County of Jonglei State, in the Greater Upper Nile region of South Sudan.

Twic east is in Dinka territory. The village is to the east of the White Nile and about 80 miles (130 km) north of Bor. The area is subject to flood and drought depending on the season. The people are pastoralists, with an economy based on cattle which demands seasonal migration in search of good pasture.

Twic east was to become a diocese of the Anglican Episcopal Church of Sudan, to be split out from Bor Diocese. There were delays, and in April 2009 the clergy unilaterally declared that Kongor was a diocese in a letter to the Rt. Reverend Nathaniel Garang Anyieth, Bishop of Bor Diocese. The root of the problem was insistence on the name "Kongor" for the diocese, while the other seven payams in Twic East county preferred the name "Twic East". It is now having three clan that include Padal, Apetloc and Bioodit. The early activist leader Joseph Oduho, one of the founders of the Sudan People's Liberation Movement (SPLM), was killed during a fight that broke out between SPLM factions at a meeting in Kongor on 27 March 1993.
