= Judith Matloff =

American journalist

- Born: March 25, 1958 (age 68); New York City
- Education: Harvard-Radcliffe, 1981
- Occupations: Journalist, author, media safety advocate
- Relatives: Maurice Matloff (uncle)
- Writing career
- Notable works: No Friends but the Mountains; Home Girl; Fragments of a Forgotten War
- Notable awards: Fulbright (twice)
- Website: judithmatloff.com

Judith Matloff (born March 25, 1958) is an American writer, journalism professor and media safety advocate. Her books are How to Drag a Body and Other Safety Tips You Hope to Never Need (2020), No Friends but the Mountains (2017), Home Girl (2008), and Fragments of a Forgotten War (1997).

She teaches conflict reporting at the Columbia Graduate School of Journalism and previously served as the Africa and Moscow bureau chief for the Christian Science Monitor. Her writing has appeared in the New York Times Magazine and Book Review, The Economist, the Financial Times, Newsweek, the Sunday Telegraph, the Dallas Morning News and Columbia Journalism Review, among other places.

== Early life and education ==
Judith Matloff was born in New York City to social workers Lawrence and Hildegarde Matloff. Lawrence eventually became an executive director of the Y.M.-Y.W.H.A. of Greater Flushing and executive vice president of Selfhelp Community Services, an agency for older people in the city founded to help victims of Nazi Germany who settled in the U.S. Educated at Hunter College High School, Judith attended Harvard-Radcliffe College, writing for The Harvard Crimson and graduated with a Bachelor of Arts in 1981. She has one sister.

== Career ==
She began her career reporting for UPI and the Mexico City News in the early 1980s. Writing mainly about areas of turmoil abroad, Matloff then served as a staff foreign correspondent for two decades, for various bureaus for Reuters and then as the Africa and Moscow bureau chief of The Christian Science Monitor. Her articles have appeared in The New York Times Magazine, The Economist, Financial Times, and Newsweek, among others.

Matloff has pioneered safety training for journalists around the world. She has consulted for NBC, the United Nations, Society of Professional Journalists, Columbia University's Dart Center for Journalism and Trauma, International News Safety Institute, the State Department, UT Austin's Knight Center for Journalism in the Americas, DCTV, the American Federation of Television and Radio Artists, and outside the United States: Mexico City-based reporting network Periodistas de a Pié, Mexico-based human rights group Cencos, BRITDOC, and the Canadian Association of Journalists.

=== Fragments of a Forgotten War ===
In 1997, she published Fragments of a Forgotten War, a damning account of Angola's slide back into civil war in 1992, drawing on first-hand reporting in Africa as a staff correspondent for Reuters. The book argued that in its rush to end Cold War proxy wars on the continent, the international community steered the country into a presidential election prematurely, and then failed to respond robustly when rebel leader Jonas Savimbi rejected his defeat and returned to the bush. BBC correspondent Fergal Keane called Matloff "one of the most astute observers of Africa" and said the book "should be read by anybody who cares about humanity."

=== Home Girl: Building a Dream House on a Lawless Block ===
In 2008, she published a memoir about starting a family after her return to New York in a fixer-upper brownstone in West Harlem. The purchase of the building was an impulse buy—it turns out to have once been a crack house and that the street is controlled by a narcotics dealer—and she and her husband must charm lax construction workers, bold drug dealers and strange neighbors in one of the country's biggest drug zones. Matloff focuses not on herself or even the house, but, as the Kirkus Reviews says "her thrilling, problem-plagued neighborhood, colorfully portrayed in terms that are neither frightened nor naive." The book received mainly positive reviews, with the Library Journal and Rocky Mountain News praising Matloff's storytelling skills, the Tucson Citizen calling the book "hugely entertaining."

=== No Friends but the Mountains: Dispatches from the World’s Violent Highlands ===
In this 2017 book, Matloff explores why mountains are home to 10 percent of the world’s population yet host a strikingly disproportionate share of the world’s conflicts. She traveled 72,000 miles over five continents to investigate the geographic link between, among others, Albanian blood feuds, separatist struggles in Dagestan and Kashmir, and Mexican vigilante squads facing down narcotics cartels. She explores military solutions while with NATO troops in the Arctic and American mountain soldiers, to conclude that autonomy is the best approach. Matloff advances the argument, hailed by the author Robert Kaplan as "original", that the physical remoteness creates existential alienation as well, and that Switzerland's canton system presents a promising model for avoiding conflict. The book received starred reviews by Publishers Weekly and Booklist. The latter called it "impressive and necessary… Matloff approaches her topic with a magic combination of wisdom and empathy, and it is impossible to not be moved." Dean of the Columbia Graduate School of Journalism Steve Coll described the book as "classical international journalism of the highest order."

=== How to Drag a Body and Other Safety Tips You Hope to Never Need ===
In her 2020 book, Matloff gives practical advice earned from her years of experience on everything from constructing a bunker to preventing bank fraud to staying clean in a shelter. The humorously written book received praise from Booklist and Bust magazine with the former calling it "a sobering, useful guide to dealing with ever-more prevalent problems." The writer Gretchen Rubin wrote of it, "extremely practical, laugh-out-loud funny, and somehow very comforting." while Sebastian Junger wrote "If you’re going to read one book to prepare for the unthinkable, read this one."

== Awards ==
- Josephine L. Murray Traveling Fellowship, Harvard-Radcliffe College
- Fulbright Scholar to Mexico, 1981–82
- The Godsell Christian Science Monitor award, 1998
- John D. and Catherine T. MacArthur Foundation International Peace and Cooperation research grant, 1995, for work on her book eventually entitled "Fragments of a Forgotten War."
- The South Asian Journalists Association, 2008, for articles on the Kashmiri for Time and the Christian Science Monitor
- Media fellowship, Hoover Institution, Stanford University, 2008
- Fulbright Scholar to Mexico, 2013–14
- Logan Nonfiction Fellowship, 2020, to write How To Drag a Body and Other Safety Tips You Hope To Never Need

== Associations ==
- PEN America
- Authors United

== Family ==
Matloff's grandparents came to the US to flee the pogroms of Russia. Her uncle, Maurice, was chief historian of the US Army from 1970 to 1981 and author of Strategic Planning and Coalition Warfare and co-author of American Military History.

== Books ==
- How to Drag a Body and Other Safety Tips You Hope to Never Need: Survival Tricks for Hacking, Hurricanes, and Hazards Life Might Throw at You
  (HarperCollins, 2020)
- The War Is in the Mountains: Violence in the World's High Places (Basic Books, 2017)
- Home Girl: Building a Dream House on a Lawless Block (Random House, 2008)
- Fragments of a Forgotten War (Penguin, South Africa, 1997)
