= Ken Oosterbroek =

South African photographer

- Born: 14 February 1962; Johannesburg, South Africa
- Died: 18 April 1994 (aged 32); Thokoza, South Africa
- Occupation: Photo editor of The Star
- Known for: Photography
- Spouse: Monica Oosterbroek
- Children: 1

Ken Oosterbroek (14 February 1962 – 18 April 1994) was a South African photojournalist and member of the Bang-Bang Club. He worked for The Star in Johannesburg, which was South Africa's biggest daily broadsheet. He won numerous photography awards for his work.

== Biography ==
Oosterbroek initially struggled to get his start in photography, going from paper to paper trying to get a job based on photos he'd taken illegally during his military service in southern Angola. Years later, in 1989, he achieved his first success, winning the Ilford Award (South African Press Photographer of the Year). In reference to this, he wrote:

And then in the morning this kind of emptiness or what-now feeling and it just wasn't so important anymore. I've got it, it's history, it's on record and now my head is free of a single-minded one-stop goal. Now I can really let it rip. Will somebody please give me a gap to let it rip? BUT, give me a break to shoot the real thing. Real, happening, life. Relevant work. Something to get the adrenaline up and the eyes peeled, the brain rolling over with possibilities and the potential for powerhouse pictures. I am a photographer. Set me free.

He would be named South African Press Photographer of the Year again by 1991, and in August of that year he was chief photographer at The Star.

== Death ==
Oosterbroek was shot and killed by members of South Africa's National Peacekeeping Force (NPKF) in Thokoza Township, about 25 km (16 mi) east of Johannesburg, on 18 April, nine days before the 27 April 1994 elections in South Africa, the country's first all-race elections. He and other photographers were covering a clash between peacekeepers and the African National Congress when the peacekeepers opened fire and shot Oosterbroek and fellow Bang-Bang Club member Greg Marinovich.

In July 1995, South Africa began a fifteen-month inquest into Oosterbroek's death. Despite overwhelming evidence and ballistics proving that only the peacekeepers were close enough to have shot and killed him, the magistrate ruled that no one could be found responsible for Oosterbroek's death. However, in January 1999, photographer Greg Marinovich, a close friend of Oosterbroek's, had a chance meeting with one of the peacekeepers who had been fighting in Thokoza the day of Oosterbroek's death, Brian Mkhize. Although Mkhize initially claimed it must have been Inkatha supporters shooting from the hostel that were responsible, on 14 February 1999, he said that out of fear and panic, the peacekeepers had unthinkingly opened fire. He stated: "I think, somewhere, somehow ... I think somewhere, one of us, the bullet that killed your brother – it came from us."

Kevin Carter wrote about Oosterbroek in his suicide note, writing, "[...] I have gone to join Ken if I am that lucky."

Oosterbroek's life and photographs are recorded in The Invisible Line: The life and photography of Ken Oosterbroek by Mike Nicol (Kwela Books & Random House 1998).

== Awards ==
Oosterbroek was nominated for the South African Press Photographer of The Year three times and won a second prize in General News category of World Press Photo in 1992.

== Personal life ==
Oosterbroek was married to journalist Monica Oosterbroek (née Nicolson), from 1991 until his death. He had one daughter, named Tabitha (born 1989), from a previous relationship.
