= Greg Marinovich =

South African photo-journalist

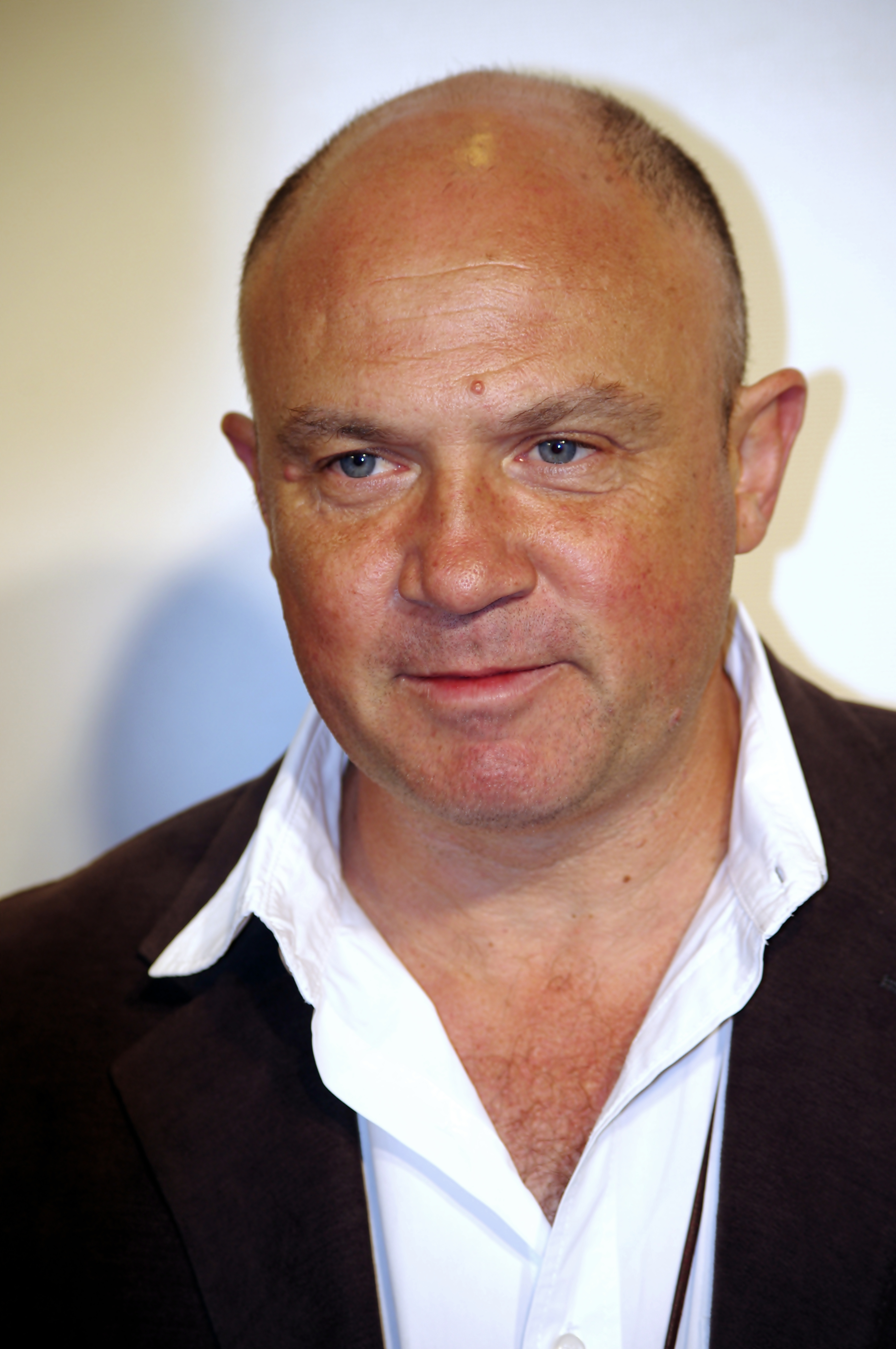
- Marinovich in 2011
- Born: Gregory Sebastian Marinovich; 8 December 1962 (age 63); Springs, Gauteng, South Africa
- Occupation: Photojournalist

Greg Marinovich (born Gregory Sebastian Marinovich, 8 December 1962) is a Pulitzer-awarded South African photojournalist, filmmaker, photo editor, and member of the Bang-Bang Club.

He co-authored the book The Bang-Bang Club: Snapshots from a Hidden War (2000), which details South Africa's transition to constitutional democracy.

== Early life ==
Marinovich was born on 8 December 1962, in Springs, Gauteng, South Africa. He is the son of an immigrant from Korčula, Croatia.

In 1985 Marinovich took pictures of Archbishop Desmond Tutu at a church service in Johannesburg. It was his first news event. From 1983 to 1985, Marinovich participated as a mandatory conscript in the military. After the initial two years, in order to not participate in camps, Marinovich left the country. He moved to Botswana. At the northern border he met members of the South West African People's Organisation (SWAPO). There started his interest to explore more the living conditions of people at times of political extremis.

Back in South Africa he worked for a hiking and safari company. At this job, he learned as an autodidact how to write articles and how to become a photojournalist. He also succeeded in finding jobs with Johannesburg-based newspapers as a photographer and sub-editing freelancer.

== Photojournalist and editor ==
=== As part of Bang Bang Club ===
On 17 August 1990, Marinovich, who was 27 at the time, went to Soweto to cover the fighting in the Hostel War. He sold the photos of the killings he witnessed to the Associated Press (AP) Johannesburg office. From that day on, he regularly worked in Soweto, often working for the AP. On 15 September 1990 Marinovich travelled again to the townships with an AP reporter from the United States. The most notorious from this period was the photos of the murder of Lindsaye Tshabalala, a Zulu Inkatha supporter and burning of his body. The photos received the Pulitzer Prize for Breaking News Photography in 1991. After the photos were published, the South African police tried to locate him as a witness to the killing, but failed as the photos credited Sebastian Balic. Marinovich was not interested in being a witness, because of the risk associated, and outing by informants.

For the nature of his work as a non-black journalist in South Africa, and the process of resistance photography and censorship and challenges facing resistance photographers, he says race was a major factor, especially in the pursuit of journalists by the South African police and their arrest. In his joint book with João Silva, he writes about his work:

Black photographers had the language and cultural skills and contacts in black communities that allowed them greater insight and access, unlike the whites, who hardly ever understood even one of the nine major black languages. But black photojournalists were much more prone to harassment by the police - no white photographer was ever detained for 18 months in solitary as Magubane had been.

=== Other work ===
Very soon, he left Johannesburg for London where he received his first international assignment for Belgrade, Yugoslavia, in November 1990, and then for Budapest, Hungary. He then flew back to South Africa and reported again about the Hostel War.

Marinovich has been shot and wounded four times while covering conflicts in South Africa and Afghanistan.

His main engagements as a journalist include:

- 1988: Freelance photographer and writer specializing in social documentary and anthropology. Part-time copy editor at a South African financial magazine.
- 1991: Freelance photographer, with works published in Time magazine, Newsweek, The New York Times, the Associated Press, and as a member of the Bang-Bang Club.
- April 1996 to August 1997: Chief photographer, the Associated Press covering the Israeli-Palestinian conflict.
- 2011: Associate editor, The Daily Maverick, Johannesburg, as writer and photographer
- 2015: Co-founder and editor: The Stand in the United States, a global documentary and photojournalism agency.

In addition, he has been engaged for international assignment in various conflict zones including Angola, Bosnia and Herzegovina, Chechnya, Croatia, India, Mozambique, Russia, Rwanda, Somalia and Zaire.

Marinovich was editor-in-chief of "Twenty Ten Project – Road to 2010". It was an initiative of World Press Photo, Free Voice, Africa Media Online and Lokaal Mondiaal dedicated to reporting on African football, related issues and the 2010 FIFA World Cup in South Africa from an African perspective.

== Academia ==
Marinovich teaches at the Harvard Extension School. He also teaches photojournalism and film at Boston University.

== Publications ==
- The Bang-Bang Club: Snapshots from a Hidden war. Co-authored with João Silva. Heinneman UK, 2000; Basic Books USA, 2000. About the group of four South African photographers active within the townships of South Africa during the apartheid period, particularly between 1990 and 1994.
- A Man's Journey to Simple Abundance. Scribner USA, 2000. A collection of essays.
- Grijalbo. Spain, 2001.
- Murder at Small Koppie: the real story of the Marikana Massacre. An investigative account of the events leading up to South African Police killing 34 miners, who were striking in South Africa on 16 August 2012.
- Der Bang-Bang Club. Germany: Wunderhorn, 2015.

== Awards ==
- 1990 Leica Award for excellence
- 1990 Visa d'Or, Scoop Award (France)
- 1991 Pulitzer Prize for Spot News Photography for coverage of African National Congress supporters brutally murdering a man they believed to be an Inkatha spy.
- 1990 Overseas Press Club, The Eastman Kodak Award
- 1994 United Nations Award of Recognition for Services to Humanity
- 1995 Mondi Award for Magazine Photography
- 2017 Alan Paton Award for Murder at Small Koppie

== Films ==
- Crime Special (1995)
- Shembe (1998)
- Ten Days in Afghanistan (1999)
- The Way of The Forefathers (2000)
- Village of the Spirits (2001)
- Looking for Luck (2002)
- The Lord's Children (2004)
- Small Boys, Big Guns (2004)
- Conversations with Goldblatt (2005)
- Njengue, Spirit of the Forest (2005)
- Dancers of God (2005)
- A series of films for the EU and UNICEF throughout Africa (2010)

== Exhibitions ==
- 1992: Somalia, Johannesburg
- 1993: Croatia, Johannesburg
- 1993: Bosnia & Croatia, United Nations, New York City
- 1999–2001: Apartheid and After, Rotterdam, Netherlands (1999); Berlin, Germany (2000); Johannesburg (2000/2001)
- 2000: AIDS, Johannesburg
