= Todd Lowe =

American actor

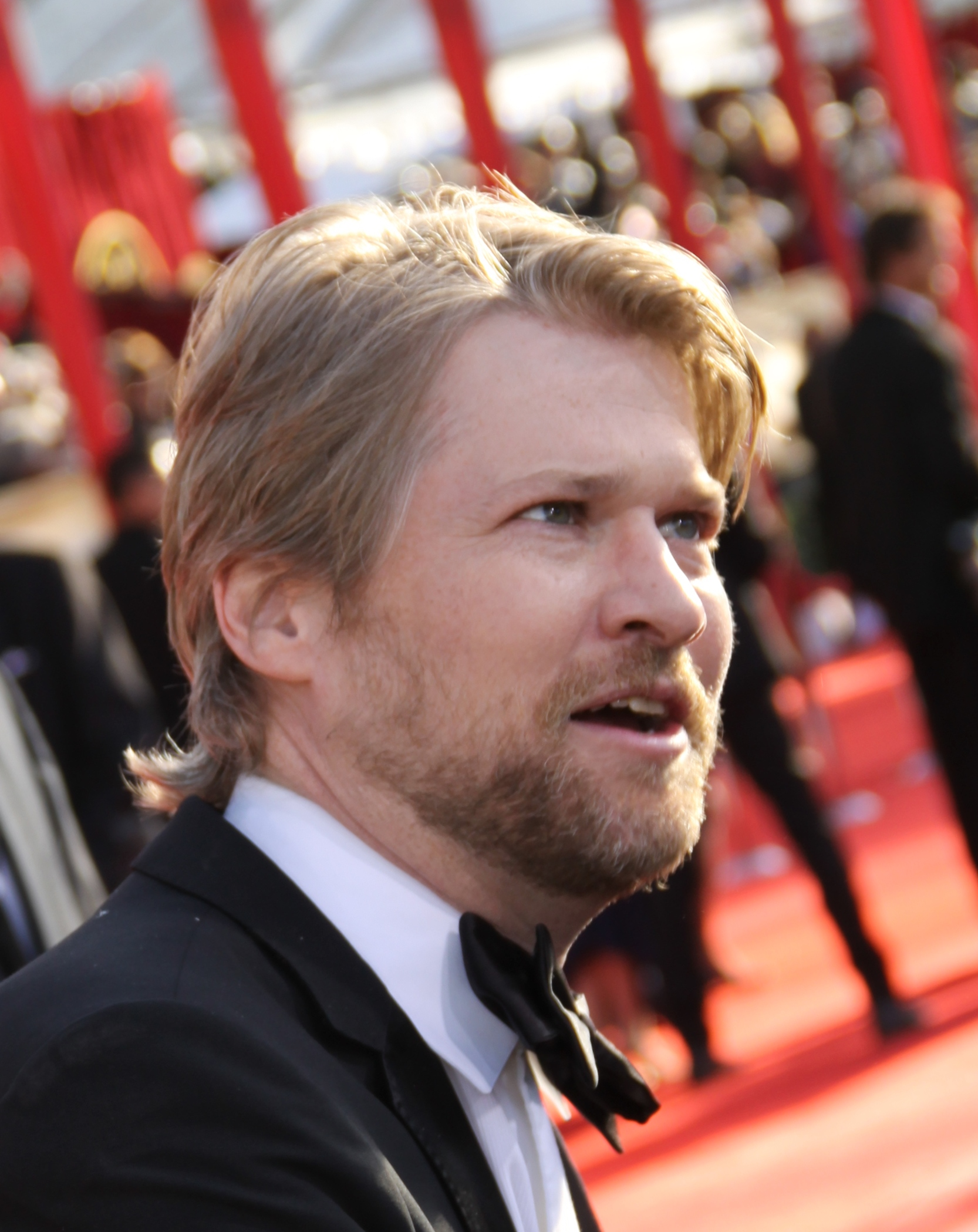
- Lowe at the 2010 SAG Awards
- Born: May 10, 1972 (age 53); Houston, Texas, U.S.
- Occupation: Actor
- Years active: 1997–present

Todd Lowe (born May 10, 1972) is an American actor. He is best known for his role as Terry Bellefleur, a PTSD-suffering Iraq War veteran who works as a short order cook at Merlotte's Bar & Grill on HBO's True Blood and as Zack Van Gerbig on Gilmore Girls. In 2017 he played the role of Colin Dobbs, another war veteran, in five episodes of the USA Network series Shooter, based on the 2007 film of the same name and the novel Point of Impact by Stephen Hunter.

In addition to television and film, Todd has starred in over twenty stage productions and has worked on several plays written by playwright Justin Tanner.

Lowe has been a singer and guitarist for Pilbilly Knights, a country-rock band based in Los Angeles. The band released a compact disc, California Nigth Club [sic] in January 2007. He is currently a member of another rock country band, The LA Hootenanny.

Lowe is a graduate of The University of Texas at Austin graduating with a Bachelor of Fine Arts degree in 1999. While looking for jobs as an actor, Lowe worked as a substitute teacher.

== Filmography ==
=== Film ===
Title	Year	Role	Notes
A Texas Funeral	1999	Skinny Private	
Natural Selection	1999	Jimmie Dickenson	
Where the Heart Is	2000	Troy	
The Princess Diaries	2001	Lana's date Eric	
My Dinner with Jimi	2003	John Lodge	
Redline	2007	Nick	
O2	2009	Trevor	Short film
Sequoia	2014	Oscar MacGrady	
50 to 1	2014	Kelly	
Groove	2014	Gus	Short film
The Girl on the Roof	2014	Rick	Short film
The Remains	2016	John	
Alamo Downs †	2017	Alamo Downs	Short film, also producer; post-production

Key
†	Denotes films that have not yet been released

=== Television ===
Title	Year	Role	Notes
Walker, Texas Ranger	1997	Jackie Perralta	Episode: "Sons of Thunder"
Walker, Texas Ranger	1999	Zack Conlon	Episode: "Lost Boys"
The '70s	2000	Man with Flag	Television film
Gilmore Girls	2002–07	Zack Van Gerbig	Recurring role (season 3–7); 42 episodes
Trash	2003	Billy	Television film
Silver Lake	2004	Grant	Television film
Without a Trace	2006	Ryan Leonard	Episode: "The Thing with Feathers"
True Blood	2008–14	Terry Bellefleur	Recurring (season 1), Main (seasons 2–6), Guest (season 7); 66 episodes
Ave 43	2009–16	Randy	Main (season 1–3), Guest (seasons 5–6, 9); 30 episodes
NCIS	2009	Agent Chad Dunham	3 episodes
CSI: Miami	2011	Jake McGrath	Episode: "Wheels Up"
Natasha Mail Order Bride Escape to America	2012	Keith	Television film
Bunheads	2012	Davis	Episode: "What's Your Damage, Heather?"
Criminal Minds	2015	William Taylor	Episode: "Awake"
Cold	2016	Thomas	5 episodes
From the Mouths of Babes	2016	Himself	Documentary; 3 episodes
Gilmore Girls: A Year in the Life	2016	Zack Van Gerbig	Recurring role; 3 episodes
Shooter	2017	Colin Dobbs	Recurring role (season 2); 5 episodes

=== Video games ===
Title	Year	Role	Notes
Turok 2: Seeds of Evil	1998	—	Additional voices/creature effects

== Awards and nominations ==
Year	Award	Category	Nominated work	Result
2009	14th Satellite Awards	Best Cast (or Best Ensemble) – Television Series	True Blood	Won
2010	16th Screen Actors Guild Awards	Outstanding Performance by an Ensemble in a Drama Series	True Blood	Nominated
