= Old Scratch =

Nickname or pseudonym for the Devil

Old Scratch or Mr. Scratch is a nickname or pseudonym for the Devil. The name likely comes from Middle English scrat, the name of a demon or goblin, derived from Old Norse skratte.

== Mentions ==
Examples of usage of the name "Old Scratch" are found in:

=== Literature ===
- "The Devil and Tom Walker" (1824) by Washington Irving
- A Christmas Carol (1843) by Charles Dickens
- The Three Clerks (1857) by Anthony Trollope
- The Adventures of Tom Sawyer (1876) by Mark Twain
- The Sing-Song of Old Man Kangaroo (1900) by Rudyard Kipling
- "The Devil and Daniel Webster" (1936) by Stephen Vincent Benét
- "Prologue to an Adventure" (1938) by Dylan Thomas
- "The Fair to Middling (1959) by Arthur Calder-Marshall
- "The Last Rung on the Ladder" (1978) by Stephen King
- Miracle Monday (1981) by Elliot S. Maggin
- Windswept House (1996, pg 402) by Fr. Malachi Martin
- Jonathan Strange & Mr Norrell (2004) by Susanna Clarke
- The Barn at the End of Our Term (2007) by Karen Russell
- Homestuck (2009) by Andrew Hussie
- I, Ripper (2015) by Stephen Hunter
- Chilling Adventures of Sabrina #6 (2016) by Roberto Aguirre-Sacasa
- "Disappearance at Devil's Rock" (2016) by Paul Tremblay
- Scratchman (2019) by Tom Baker

=== Film ===
- The Devil and Daniel Webster (1941)
- The Story of Mankind (1957)
- Crossroads (1986)
- Prince of Darkness (1987)
- The Witches of Eastwick (1987)
- Rock 'n' Roll Nightmare (1987)
- Crazy as Hell (2002)
- 5ive Girls (2006)
- Mud (2012)

=== Television ===
- Dimension 20
- Constantine
- American Dad! (Episode: "Permanent Record Wrecker")
- Lucifer (Episode: "Lucifer, Stay. Good Devil.")
- Quantum Leap (Episode: "The Boogieman")
- The Messengers (Episode: "Death Becomes Her")
- Billions (Episode: "The Wrong Maria Gonzalez") (2018)
- American Horror Story (Episode: "Sojourn")
- Criminal Minds
- Chilling Adventures of Sabrina Netflix TV series (2018) by Roberto Aguirre-Sacasa
- Being Human
- Hap and Leonard (TV series) (Season 3, Episode 1)
- The Cuphead Show! (season 1, episode 1, "Carn-Evil")
- A Christmas Carol (FX, 2019)
- Lawmen: Bass Reeves (Episode 7)
- Agatha All Along

=== Music ===
- "Beelz" song written by Stephen Lynch
- "Three Men Hanging" song by Murder by Death
- "Tight Like That" by Clutch
- "Un-Reborn Again" by Queens of the Stone Age
- "Bewitched" by Beat Happening
- ”The Devil Lives in a Mason Jar” by John Driskell Hopkins
- "Oldscratch" by The Distillers
- "Old Scratch Blues" by Jack White

=== Video games ===
- Alan Wake
- Alan Wake's American Nightmare
- Alan Wake 2
- Descent 3
- Assassin's Creed IV: Black Flag
- Pirate101
- The Simpsons: Tapped Out
- Fears to Fathom - Scratch Creek
- Basilisk SNES

=== Miscellaneous ===
- Episode 12 of the podcast Welcome to Night Vale
- Parts 31-38 of the Malevolent podcast
- A proposed Doctor Who feature film developed by Tom Baker and Ian Marter was given the working title Doctor Who Meets Scratchman.
