= Hot Springs (novel) =

2000 thriller novel by Stephen Hunter

- First edition
- Author: Stephen Hunter
- Language: English
- Series: Earl Swagger
- Genre: Thriller
- Publisher: Simon & Schuster
- Publication date: 2000
- Publication place: United States
- Media type: Print (Hardback)
- Pages: 701 pp
- ISBN: 978-0-671-03545-7
- OCLC: 47054958
- Followed by: Pale Horse Coming

Hot Springs is a 2000 thriller novel by Stephen Hunter.

It is about gangsters and gambling in Hot Springs, Arkansas. It is the first novel in the series featuring Hunter's character Earl Swagger.

It is summer 1946 and Earl Swagger, former Marine and recipient of the Medal of Honor, feels he is an angry man with nowhere to go in the post-war peace. But then he joins a new war, the one against organized crime, and in this hellish crucible rediscovers his courageous true self.

== Plot summary ==
Right after the official ceremony of receiving the Medal of Honor in Washington, D.C., 1stSgt Earl Swagger (retired) is being approached by district attorney of Garland County Fred Becker and ex-FBI agent D. A. Parker. The two men propose him a new job in Hot Springs, Arkansas to fight against organized crime and finally end the gambling and corruption of the city. Swagger's mission is to train twelve young policemen into a "dream team" and instruct them during operations in city casinos. The mission is to close down all gambling places, preferably without hurting people. If violence becomes necessary, they are outfitted with custom .45 automatics, Thompson submachine guns, and Browning automatic rifles as well as 12 gauge shotguns and M1 Carbines.

Soon after accepting the new job, Earl finds out that his wife June is pregnant. She doesn't support Earl's idea to work in Hot Springs and is afraid of him being killed.

One of the "dream team" members, young policeman Frenchy Short (who also has a critical but unseen role in Black Light) is a smart young man, who feels that he can be above and better than the others in the team. Several times he tries to do something better than the others but in the end fails. That way he once killed two men during an assassination in the casino. Luckily for him, these two men were known bandits and Frenchy became sort of a hero. Next time, while supposedly on vacation, Frenchy finds the central office of the gambling network and reveals his research results to Swagger and Parker. This results in Becker firing him from the team because of illegal way of gathering evidence (as Frenchy, in fact, broke into a telephone office to search the maps). An enraged Short promptly goes over to the other side. For a little favor, he informs the city boss Owney Maddox (based on real-life Hot Springs gangster Owney Madden) of everything related to the "dream team".

On the other hand, during the holiday Short's "dream team" partner Carlo Henderson (later seen in Dirty White Boys) is asked by D. A. Parker to investigate Swagger's past and find out, how is Swagger so familiar with Hot Springs's landscape. Swagger has shown knowledge of the city several times, pointing out important nuances during the operations, however claims that he's never been to Hot Springs before. Parker suggests that Swagger has the death instinct, because Swagger always tries to get into action himself, without wearing the bulletproof vest. During the investigation, Henderson finds out that Swagger's brother was beaten a lot by their father, Charles Swagger, former sheriff of Polk County. Carlo's investigation ultimately leads him to the belief that Earl was responsible for his father's death. When he finally questions him on the subject, Earl reveals that he did not kill his father, but found him dying in Hot Springs. He took him out of there and faked the robbery that supposedly got him killed to protect his father's reputation (and his own as well). Sam Vincent, who at the time is assistant of attorney in Garland, Arkansas. briefly assists Henderson with the investigation. Vincent also appears in other Hunter's novels, such as Point of Impact and Black Light.

In the meanwhile, the governor of Arkansas orders a Highway Patrol unit to confiscate all heavy weaponry and bulletproof vests from the team, leaving them only with their handguns. Several members decide to leave, leaving only seven men. Short suggests Maddox to make a trap for the "dream team", which results in seven of them dying, including old D. A. Parker. The sole survivors are Swagger and Henderson. They are then arrested by the police and later let go, with no money paid and on the condition that they never, ever return to Hot Springs.

Soon after, Maddox is being arrested with the accusation of owning stolen artwork. He's freed from prison by the crew of assassins who ambushed the raid team, but Swagger finds them in a place called Hard Bargain Valley and uses his Marine Issue M1A1 Thompson to kill all of them in a savage protracted gunfight, including Maddox. Swagger also finds out that Maddox was the actual murderer of his father.

In the meantime, June is in the hospital giving birth to their son, which doesn't appear to be easy because of an unusual position of the baby. The local doctor can't rescue both the mother and the child, so Earl brings another doctor with him, who is black. The locals in the town, outraged that a black doctor has entered a white hospital and is assisting a white patient, form a lynch mob and approach the hospital. Earl, carrying three loaded .45's, confronts them and warns them that if a fight occurs, a lot of them will die. The mob backs off. June survives, and successfully gives birth to their son, Bob Lee Swagger.
