= The 47th Samurai =

2007 novel by Stephen Hunter

- Author: Stephen Hunter
- Language: English
- Series: Bob Lee Swagger series
- Genre: Thriller
- Published: 2007 (Simon & Schuster)
- Publication place: United States
- Media type: Print (hardback)
- Pages: 368 pp
- ISBN: 0-7432-3809-5
- OCLC: 83977531
- Dewey Decimal: 813/.54 22
- LC Class: PS3558.U494 A615 2007
- Preceded by: Time to Hunt
- Followed by: Night of Thunder

The 47th Samurai is a 2007 thriller novel, and the fourth in the Bob Lee Swagger series by Stephen Hunter. In narrative sequence it is preceded by Point of Impact, Black Light, and Time to Hunt.

== Plot ==
The story begins with Bob Lee now living in Idaho. There along with his wife, former wife of his spotter Donny Fenn, he is cultivating his land by using a scythe. The story starts while Bob Lee is cutting away at his land with the scythe while an expensive car pulls up. Bob Lee is aggravated by this, since his previous encounters with such cars and men in them have led him into troublesome situations.

Having this predisposition to the men within the car, Bob Lee confronts them to make them leave him and his family alone. Instead he finds a man roughly the same age as himself, looking for Bob Lee, since he is the son of the man that was killed by Bob's father during the battle of Iwo Jima. Here the book changes to the situations that led to the awarding of the Medal of Honor, to Earl Swagger during a battle on Iwo Jima.

== Development ==
=== Publication history ===
The book was published by Simon & Schuster on September 11, 2007.

== Reception ==
The book received positive reception from critics. Kirkus Reviews described the book as being somewhat formulaic but still enjoyable, while Publishers Weekly complimented the plot's tension and commented that the novel was engaging.
