= Dead Zero =

2010 novel by Stephen Hunter

- First edition
- Language: English
- Series: Bob Lee Swagger series
- Genre: Thriller
- Publisher: Simon & Schuster
- Publication date: December 28, 2010
- Publication place: United States
- Media type: Print (hardback)
- Pages: 384 pp
- ISBN: 978-1-4391-3865-6
- Preceded by: I, Sniper
- Followed by: The Third Bullet

Dead Zero is a novel by Stephen Hunter, published by Simon & Schuster in 2011. It is Hunter's seventh novel whose hero is Bob Lee Swagger, a U. S. Marine Corps sniper who first appears in Point of Impact which is partially set in the Vietnam War. It is eleventh in order of publication and seventh in the chronology of the character.

== Reception ==
Reception was mixed, with Kirkus Reviews saying, "A premise that had a chance to be compelling is diffused by a momentum-killing willingness to digress. Hunter has done much better." and The Oregonian calling it "a disappointment", while Publishers Weekly gushed that a "solid characterization complements the tight, fast-moving plot."
