= Shooter (TV series) =

2016 American television drama

- Genre: Drama; Action; Thriller
- Based on: Point of Impact; Black Light; Time to Hunt by Stephen Hunter
- Developed by: John Hlavin
- Starring: Ryan Phillippe; Shantel VanSanten; Omar Epps; Cynthia Addai-Robinson; Eddie McClintock; Josh Stewart; Gerald McRaney
- Composer: Bobby Krlic
- Country of origin: United States
- Original language: English
- No. of seasons: 3
- No. of episodes: 31

Production
- Executive producers: Lorenzo di Bonaventura; John Hlavin; Stephen Levinson; Mark Wahlberg
- Producer: Ryan Phillippe
- Production locations: Vancouver, British Columbia; Santa Clarita, California
- Cinematography: Michael Eley; Jamie Reynoso
- Editors: Gary D. Roach; William Yeh; Amy McGrath; Zack Arnold
- Running time: 42 minutes
- Production companies: Leverage Entertainment; Di Bonaventura Pictures; Closest to the Hole Productions; Universal Cable Productions; Paramount Television

Original release
- Network: USA Network
- Release: November 15, 2016 – September 13, 2018

Shooter is an American drama television series based on the 2007 film of the same name and the first three novels in the Bob Lee Swagger series by Stephen Hunter. The show stars Ryan Phillippe in the lead role of Bob Lee Swagger, a retired United States Marine Corps Scout Sniper from MARSOC living in seclusion who is coaxed back into action after learning of a plot to kill the President. USA Network picked up the pilot in August 2015 and ordered the series in February 2016.

The series was originally set to premiere on July 19, 2016, but it was postponed to July 26 due to the July 7 Dallas police officer shootings. USA pulled it entirely after the Baton Rouge police officer shootings on July 17. On October 3, 2016, USA announced that the new premiere date for Shooter would be November 15, 2016. On December 19, 2016, the series was renewed for a second season that premiered on July 18, 2017. On December 4, 2017, the series was renewed for a third season.

On August 15, 2018, USA Network canceled Shooter after three seasons, and its final episode aired on September 13, 2018.

== Cast and characters ==
=== Main ===
- Ryan Phillippe as Former GySgt Bob Lee Swagger, a highly trained Marine Raider Scout Sniper and medically retired Marine.
- Shantel VanSanten as Julie Swagger, Bob Lee's wife
- Cynthia Addai-Robinson as Nadine Memphis, an FBI agent investigating Swagger
- Omar Epps as Former Captain Isaac Johnson, a Secret Service Agent, who was Swagger's commanding officer in Marine Raider Regiment.
- Eddie McClintock as Jack Payne, a figure involved in the conspiracy against Swagger (season 1; guest, season 3)
- Josh Stewart as Solotov, a Chechen master sniper with whom Bob Lee has tangled before (seasons 2–3)
- Jesse Bradford as Harris Downey, a D.C. staffer who was once involved with Nadine (recurring, season 2; main, season 3)
- Gerald McRaney as Red Bama Sr., owner of Bama Cattle and an Undersecretary in the Department of Agriculture (season 3)

=== Recurring ===
- David Andrews as Sam Vincent, Bob Lee's close friend and lawyer. (season 1, 3)
- David Marciano as Howard Utey, FBI Special Agent in Charge - Nadine Memphis' superior (season 1)
- Lexy Kolker as Mary Swagger, Bob Lee's and Julie's daughter
- William Fichtner as Rathford O'Brien, Bob Lee's former shooting instructor
- Tom Sizemore as Hugh Meachum, a CIA black ops operative with mysterious motives (season 1)
- Rob Brown as Donny Fenn, Swagger's best friend and spotter who was killed by Solotov (seasons 1–2)
- Sean Cameron Michael as Grigory Krukov, a Russian FSB agent (season 1)
- Delaina Mitchell as Anna Wallingford, Julie's married sister and Mary's aunt (season 1, 3)
- David Chisum as Jim Wallingford, Anna's husband and Julie's brother in law (season 1)
- Michelle Krusiec as Lin Johnson, Isaac's loyal wife (season 1-2)
- Matt Shallenberger as John Wheeler, a mysterious and deadly Atlas operative (guest: season 1, recurring: season 3)
- Desmond Harrington as Lon Scott, the CEO of Anhur Dynamics (season 1)
- Beverly D'Angelo as Patricia Gregson, a former National Security Advisor
- Jerry Ferrara as Kirk Zehnder, a former marine who always detects a conspiracy and is part of the core team of Bob Lee Swagger (season 2)
- Todd Lowe as Colin Dobbs, a former marine in Swagger's unit, now living in Texas an hour from the Swagger Ranch (season 2)
- Patrick Sabongui as Yusuf Ali, a core member of Swagger's original Marine team (season 2)
- Jaina Lee Ortiz as Angela Tio, an active duty Marine who formerly served with Bob Lee's unit (season 2)
- John Marshall Jones as Sheriff Brown, the local law enforcement in Bob Lee's hometown and a long-time friend (season 2–3)
- Harry Hamlin as Sen. Addison Hayes, a mysterious and powerful mastermind whose agenda will collide with Swagger (seasons 2–3)
- Troy Garity as Jeffrey Denning, a seasoned investigative journalist who cares deeply about justice being served (season 2)
- Derek Phillips as Earl Swagger, Bob Lee's father, a Vietnam veteran who was sheriff in Bob Lee's hometown before he was killed in 1988 (season 3)
- Tait Blum as Young Bob Lee (season 3)
- Conor O'Farrell as Rick Culp, a West Texas prison guard who may have been involved in Earl Swagger's death (season 3)
- Eric Ladin as Red Bama Jr., Red Sr's screw-up of a son who desperately wants his father's respect and confidence (season 3)
- Brian Letscher as Bert Salinger, an employee of Red Bama Sr. who watches over Red Jr. (season 3)
- Felisha Terrell as Carlita Cruise, a former Atlas operative embedded in the Dept. of Agriculture who helps Nadine and Isaac take down her former employers (season 3)
- Mallory Jansen as Margo, an Agent for the Department of Justice who has been attempting to bring down Atlas for years (season 3)
- Kurt Fuller as Andrew Gold, the Deputy Chief of Staff to the U.S. President and high ranking Atlas member (season 3)
- Dee Wallace as Katherine Mansfield, the long-time former mission planner for Atlas who is now forced to reside in a mental institution (season 3)
- Michael O'Neill as Ray Brooks, a Federal judge nominated for a vacancy on the U.S. Supreme Court and Atlas operative (season 3)

== Production ==
On July 6, 2016, while filming a scene at Agua Dulce Airpark, actor Tom Sizemore accidentally ran over a stuntman. Sizemore was supposed to enter the Cadillac Escalade and stay there until the scene ended, but the stunt coordinator told him to pull out, not realizing that the stuntman was behind him.

On July 26, 2017, the second-season episode order was cut back from the planned ten episodes to the eight episodes already filmed after Ryan Phillippe broke his leg on July 16, 2017, in an incident unrelated to the series.

About the cancellation, Omar Epps said: "That was all backdoor politics. It had nothing to do with the numbers. Me and Ryan [Phillippe] had a great time. We were like kids in a candy store. We used to laugh every day we showed up to work, like, 'We're kids again!' We just get to run and jump, push, punch. You know, stuff that little boys do. It was like playing in the playground in the sandbox. I had a great, great time on that show. I have a lot of respect for John Hlavin, who's a showrunner on there. And like I said, Ryan and I got cool and had a great time on that show. That was just the backdoor politics."

== Episodes ==
Season	Episodes	Originally released	
Season	Episodes	First released	Last released
1	10	November 15, 2016	January 17, 2017
2	8	July 18, 2017	September 5, 2017
3	13	June 21, 2018	September 13, 2018

=== Season 1 (2016–17) ===
Based on Point of Impact by Stephen Hunter.

No. overall	No. in season	Title	Directed by	Written by	Original release date	U.S. viewers (millions)
1	1	"Point of Impact"	Simon Cellan Jones	Story by : John Hlavin; Teleplay by : John Hlavin & Jonathan Lemkin	November 15, 2016	1.44
Bob Lee Swagger, a retired Marine Corps sniper, is approached by Isaac, his former captain, now in the US Secret Service, to do some security work before the President's visit to Seattle. His job is to scout the venues for possible sniper nests due to credible threat. However, he is unable to prevent the shot from being taken; the visiting Ukrainian president is killed and Bob Lee is the fall guy. Nadine, a disgraced FBI agent, arrests him.
2	2	"Exfil"	Simon Cellan Jones	John Hlavin	November 22, 2016	1.25
Awaiting arraignment, Bob Lee has to stay alive in federal prison, while the conspirators are trying to get him killed. During one of those botched attempts, Bob Lee manages to escape. He vows to do what he does best: hunt.
3	3	"Musa Qala"	Roxann Dawson	Adam E. Fierro	November 29, 2016	1.67
Since Bob Lee is out in the world, he's the subject of a manhunt. He is able to tell his wife that Isaac is part of the conspiracy and later gets help from a friend at the VA to fake his own death and become a ghost. He trusts Nadine with this secret.
4	4	"Overwatch"	Simon Cellan Jones	T.J. Brady & Rasheed Newson	December 6, 2016	1.36
In flashbacks, Isaac is saved by Bob Lee in Afghanistan in a plot to snatch a warlord for the CIA. Meanwhile, the conspirators try to silence Nadine, who started asking the wrong questions, though Bob Lee is just in time to save her.
5	5	"Recon by Fire"	Adam Davidson	Dara Resnik	December 13, 2016	1.30
Bob Lee finds the original bullet used in the assassination and traces it back to a fringe militia. Even though they aren't the source for the bullet, they are preparing for something nefarious and Bob Lee stops them.
6	6	"Killing Zone"	Simon Cellan Jones	Matt Bosack	December 20, 2016	1.53
Bob Lee follows the breadcrumbs the bullet left to his former instructor, O'Brien. He tells Bob Lee to find the "black kings", one of only four sniper rifles capable of making the shot. He gives Bob Lee his own black king after they both deal with a clandestine outfit the conspirators send on their path called "Annex B". Nadine is finally able to convince her boss at the FBI some things aren't adding up.
7	7	"Danger Close"	Christoph Schrewe	Tim Talbott	December 27, 2016	1.63
Bob Lee crosses the country to find the shooter while Julie deals with a family betrayal. Meanwhile, Nadine contacts a Ukrainian reporter who can explain the conspiracy. Also, Isaac questions his allegiance.
8	8	"Red on Red"	Kevin Bray	Matthew Newman	January 3, 2017	1.43
Bob Lee and Nadine weave a plan to secure the evidence that could expose the conspiracy. Meanwhile, Isaac gropes for an exit strategy, Payne tries to flee, and Julie and Mary face grave danger.
9	9	"Ballistic Advantage"	Christoph Schrewe	T.J. Brady & Rasheed Newson	January 10, 2017	1.42
Bob Lee must broker a dangerous exchange in order to save his family. Meanwhile, Nadine struggles to balance her allegiance to Bob Lee and the FBI. Later, Isaac strikes a tenuous deal for his freedom.
10	10	"Primer Contact"	Simon Cellan Jones	John Hlavin	January 17, 2017	1.45
Bob Lee, Julie, Nadine, and Isaac must work together to breach the Russian Embassy, save Mary, shut down the conspiracy and its remaining players, and prove Bob Lee is innocent once and for all.

=== Season 2 (2017) ===
Based on Time to Hunt by Stephen Hunter.

No. overall	No. in season	Title	Directed by	Written by	Original release date	U.S. viewers (millions)
11	1	"The Hunting Party"	Yuval Adler	John Hlavin	July 18, 2017	1.51
In the season premiere, Bob Lee Swagger and wife Julie join his former Marine unit in Germany and narrowly escape a deadly terrorist attack. FBI Agent Nadine Memphis, meanwhile, takes a job in Washington with Patricia Gregson.
12	2	"Remember the Alamo"	Yuval Adler	Will Staples	July 25, 2017	1.17
Bob Lee investigates the terrorist attack that may have targeted his Marine unit. Memphis helps on the ground in Germany. Flashbacks to Afghanistan help shed light on who might be after them.
13	3	"Don't Mess With Texas"	Jaime Reynoso	T.J. Brady & Rasheed Newson	August 1, 2017	1.16
Bob Lee finds Isaac Johnson in Texas after an attempt on his life. Nadine discovers just how much influence Patricia Gregson wields, and a traumatized Julie fights to stay strong for her family.
14	4	"The Dark End of the Street"	David Straiton	Kate Barnow	August 8, 2017	1.27
Bob Lee and Isaac learn who the world's greatest assassin is in the U.S. Flashbacks to a mission in Afghanistan reveal his identity: Solotov. Nadine comes to Texas with suspicions of a conspiracy.
15	5	"The Man Called Noon"	Lukas Ettlin	Jennifer Cacicio & John Hlavin	August 15, 2017	1.19
Bob Lee works to piece together Solotov's motive for targeting their unit. Nadine uncovers a surprise witness to the event that set everything off. Solotov's hunt has him hiding in plain sight.
16	6	"Across the Rio Grande"	David Straiton	Matthew Newman	August 22, 2017	1.20
Bob Lee tracks Solotov's money, pitting himself against a Mexican cartel. Nadine helps a journalist investigate a cover-up involving Bob Lee's unit. Julie shoots a guy's ear off with a gun to vent her frustration.
17	7	"Someplace Like Bolivia"	Chloe Domont	John Hlavin	August 29, 2017	1.30
Bob Lee and Isaac must team up to escape a Mexican prison before Solotov finds them. As Nadine digs deeper into Atlas, the cover-up points back to Bob Lee's unit. Julie has problems with the law.
18	8	"That'll Be the Day"	Jaime Reynoso	Scott Gold	September 5, 2017	1.20
Bob Lee tries to draw Solotov into the open, but realizes the Chechen holds the upper hand. Flashbacks reveal the origins of Solotov, while Isaac is courted by his creator in the present.

=== Season 3 (2018) ===
Based on Black Light by Stephen Hunter.

No. overall	No. in season	Title	Directed by	Written by	Original release date	U.S. viewers (millions)
19	1	"Backroads"	Jaime Reynoso	T.J. Brady & Rasheed Newson	June 21, 2018	0.92
Flashbacks to a childhood trauma plague Bob Lee as he's held hostage with Isaac and Julie in pursuit. Nadine confronts a corrupt senator.
20	2	"Red Meat"	David Straiton	John Hlavin	June 28, 2018	0.72
Determined to find the truth about his father's death in 1988, Bob Lee starts to investigate. Harris gets dragged into Isaac and Nadine's predicament.
21	3	"Sins of the Father"	Amanda Marsalis	Amanda Segel	July 5, 2018	0.72
Harris gets on Bob Lee's nerves out on the road as they chase more leads. Nadine and Isaac locate a person of interest who may or may not be friendly.
22	4	"The Importance of Service"	Christopher Schrewe	Jennifer Cacicio	July 12, 2018	0.77
Bob Lee pays a visit to the Pooles after hearing a new rumour, and Julie follows a lead of her own. Isaac and Nadine pursue an Atlas target.
23	5	"A Call to Arms"	David Straiton	Matt Bosack	July 19, 2018	0.70
A visit to an old friend of his father's leads Bob Lee back to D.C., where he connects with Isaac, Nadine and Harris for a mission at a formal event.
24	6	"Lines Crossed"	Jessica Lowrey	T.J. Brady & Rasheed Newson	July 26, 2018	0.67
Bob Lee and Isaac visit a man who served with Earl in Vietnam. Nadine takes on a risky mission alone. Julie confronts the Bamas.
25	7	"Swing Vote"	Christoph Schrewe	Scott Gold & Tim Walsh	August 2, 2018	0.70
Bob Lee and Isaac track down a key contract at a psychiatric facility. Memphis looks for evidence at Gregson's house. Red Jr. makes an offer to Sam.
26	8	"The Red Badge"	Chloe Domont	John Hlavin	August 9, 2018	0.71
Bob Lee and Julie discover what Red Jr. wanted from Sam. Red Sr. ends up in a tough spot. Carlita, Harris, Isaac and Nadine plot their next move.
27	9	"Alpha Dog"	Hanelle Culpepper	Amanda Segel	August 16, 2018	0.79
Bob Lee's mission to track down Bama Jr. causes discord with Julie. Isaac and Nadine meet with the president's chief of staff
28	10	"Orientation Day"	David Straiton	Jennifer Cacicio & Desta Tedros Reff	August 23, 2018	0.70
A search for Carlita leads Bob Lee and Isaac to a remote Atlas outpost. Nadine and Harris put pressure on Brooks. Julie has an unsettling realization
29	11	"Family Fire"	Ami Canaan Mann	Eric Anderson & Matt Bosack	August 30, 2018	0.73
As Julie tries to keep Mary safe, Bob Lee sets his sights on Brooks. Nadine and Isaac develop a plan involving an Atlas recruit.
30	12	"Patron Saint"	Millicent Shelton	David Daitch & Katie Johnson & Matthew Newman	September 6, 2018	0.59
The U.S. president reaches out to Nadine and Harris for their assistance. Julie and Bob Lee have an emotional discussion. A new threat endangers D.C.
31	13	"Red Light"	David Straiton	John Hlavin	September 13, 2018	0.79
As Atlas and Red Bama attempt to execute desperate missions, Bob Lee tries to reconnect with Julie while getting dragged back into the fight.

== Broadcast ==
Shooter aired on Thursdays at 10:00 pm on USA Network. The episodes are approximately 43 minutes, and are broadcast in both high- and standard definition. In addition, the streaming service Netflix started to broadcast the series in certain regions worldwide, the first season weekly on November 15, 2016, with a one-day delay with respect to the original United States broadcast.

== Reception ==
Shooter received mixed reviews from critics. On the review aggregator Rotten Tomatoes, the series has an approval rating of 47% based on 17 reviews, with an average rating of 5.75/10. The site's critical consensus reads: "Ryan Phillippe's efforts aren't enough to salvage Shooter, a tedious, under-developed drama that lacks an original voice or perspective." On Metacritic, which assigns a normalized rating, the series has a score 60 out of 100, based on 11 critics, indicating "mixed or average reviews".

=== Ratings ===
==== Season 1 (2016–17) ====
Viewership and ratings per episode of Shooter
No.	Title	Air date	Rating (18–49)	Viewers (millions)	DVR (18–49)	DVR viewers (millions)	Total (18–49)	Total viewers (millions)
1	"Point of Impact"	November 15, 2016	0.5	1.44	0.3	1.03	0.8	2.47
2	"Exfil"	November 22, 2016	0.4	1.25	0.3	1.15	0.7	2.40
3	"Musa Qala"	November 29, 2016	0.5	1.67	—N/a	1.14	—N/a	2.81
4	"Overwatch"	December 6, 2016	0.5	1.36	0.3	1.17	0.8	2.53
5	"Recon by Fire"	December 13, 2016	0.4	1.30	0.4	1.29	0.8	2.59
6	"Killing Zone"	December 20, 2016	0.5	1.53	—N/a	—N/a	—N/a	—N/a
7	"Danger Close"	December 27, 2016	0.5	1.63	—N/a	—N/a	—N/a	—N/a
8	"Red on Red"	January 3, 2017	0.5	1.43	0.4	1.40	0.9	2.83
9	"Ballistic Advantage"	January 10, 2017	0.5	1.42	0.4	1.25	0.9	2.67
10	"Primer Contact"	January 17, 2017	0.5	1.45	0.4	1.35	0.9	2.80

==== Season 2 (2017) ====
Viewership and ratings per episode of Shooter
No.	Title	Air date	Rating (18–49)	Viewers (millions)	DVR (18–49)	DVR viewers (millions)	Total (18–49)	Total viewers (millions)
1	"The Hunting Party"	July 18, 2017	0.4	1.51	0.4	1.26	0.8	2.77
2	"Remember the Alamo"	July 25, 2017	0.3	1.17	—N/a	—N/a	—N/a	—N/a
3	"Don't Mess With Texas"	August 1, 2017	0.3	1.16	0.4	1.33	0.7	2.49
4	"The Dark End of the Street"	August 8, 2017	0.3	1.27	0.4	1.17	0.7	2.44
5	"The Man Called Noon"	August 15, 2017	0.3	1.19	0.4	1.27	0.7	2.47
6	"Across the Rio Grande"	August 22, 2017	0.3	1.20	0.4	1.22	0.7	2.42
7	"Someplace Like Bolivia"	August 29, 2017	0.4	1.30	0.3	1.24	0.7	2.55
8	"That'll Be the Day"	September 5, 2017	0.4	1.20	—N/a	—N/a	—N/a	—N/a

==== Season 3 (2018) ====
Viewership and ratings per episode of Shooter
No.	Title	Air date	Rating (18–49)	Viewers (millions)	DVR (18–49)	DVR viewers (millions)	Total (18–49)	Total viewers (millions)
1	"Backroads"	June 21, 2018	0.3	0.92	—N/a	1.15	—N/a	2.07
2	"Red Meat"	June 28, 2018	0.2	0.72	—N/a	—N/a	—N/a	—N/a
3	"Sins of the Father"	July 5, 2018	0.2	0.72	—N/a	—N/a	—N/a	—N/a
4	"The Importance of Service"	July 12, 2018	0.2	0.77	0.3	1.02	0.5	1.79
5	"A Call to Arms"	July 19, 2018	0.2	0.70	—N/a	0.94	—N/a	1.64
6	"Lines Crossed"	July 26, 2018	0.2	0.67	—N/a	0.90	—N/a	1.57
7	"Swing Vote"	August 2, 2018	0.2	0.70	—N/a	—N/a	—N/a	—N/a
8	"The Red Badge"	August 9, 2018	0.2	0.71	—N/a	—N/a	—N/a	—N/a
9	"Alpha Dog"	August 16, 2018	0.2	0.79	—N/a	0.85	—N/a	1.64
10	"Orientation Day"	August 23, 2018	0.2	0.70	—N/a	—N/a	—N/a	—N/a
11	"Family Fire"	August 30, 2018	0.2	0.73	0.2	0.86	0.4	1.59
12	"Patron Saint"	September 6, 2018	0.1	0.59	0.3	0.90	0.4	1.49
13	"Red Light"	September 13, 2018	0.2	0.79	0.2	0.82	0.4	1.61
