= Time to Hunt =

1998 novel by Stephen Hunter

Time To Hunt
- First edition
- Author: Stephen Hunter
- Language: English
- Series: Bob Lee Swagger series
- Genre: Thriller
- Publisher: Doubleday
- Publication date: April 13, 1998
- Publication place: United States
- Media type: Print (Hardback & Paperback)
- Pages: 463 pp
- ISBN: 0-385-48043-1 (hardback edition)
- OCLC: 37975648
- Dewey Decimal: 813/.54 21
- LC Class: PS3558.U494 T56 1998
- Preceded by: Black Light
- Followed by: The 47th Samurai

Time to Hunt is a 1998 thriller novel, and the third in the Bob Lee Swagger series by Stephen Hunter. In narrative sequence it is preceded by Point of Impact and Black Light.

== Plot summary ==
The book begins about four or five years after the events in Black Light. Swagger's daughter is now around 8, and he owns a "lay-up" horse ranch, where he cares for horses. He has been slipping into a deep depression due to his inability to properly support his family.

Alienating himself from his wife and child, they leave for a morning horseback ride with a friend from another ranch. His wife is shot and nearly killed by a sniper, and the friend is killed. Bob assumes that the man was mistaken for him, and killed in an attempt to kill Bob Lee. This act plunges him back into a world of violence and intrigue.

While his wife recuperates, he attempts to unravel the secrets behind the assault.

This book has a dual plot, with the present plot, dealing with Bob's investigation into his wife's attempted murder. The second plot is set in the past, beginning on a Marine Corps base in the late 1960s or early 1970s.

A young Donny Fenn is the squad leader of a group of Marines who perform the state funeral services for Marines killed in the Vietnam War, which is raging across the world. Donny is brought before his superiors and ordered to follow one of his men, who is suspected of sympathizing with peace demonstrators who are led by a charismatic man named Trig Carter. In turn, Trig is suspected of having ties to an extremist group. Incidentally, Donny's girlfriend, Julie, is involved with this group of war protestors. Donny discovers that his sympathies lie closer to Trig's friends, and rather than rat out his own man, Donny defies naval investigators, buying a one-way ticket to the front lines of the Vietnam war. Just before being shipped out, his commanding officer, who admires Donny's courage, gives him enough money to run off with Julie and marry.

Donny meets up with Bob Lee Swagger, a Marine Sniper at the top of his game, joining him as Bob Lee's new spotter. Scourge of the North Vietnamese army, there is already a sizeable bounty on Bob Lee's head, but after an exciting firefight to rescue an overwhelmed outpost, a vengeful NVA Colonel calls out the big gun, which is Solaratov, a Russian sniper who is the only man alive who could possibly equal Bob Lee Swagger.

Donny is getting extremely short (close to going home). On Donny's last day in Vietnam, a day he should spend completing paperwork that will send him home, he makes the fateful decision to go on one last reconnaissance with Bob Lee. Solaratov's bullet ends both Bob Lee's career in the Marine Corps and Donny Fenn's life.

Back in the present, Bob Lee is unraveling the tapestry of lies that have buried the past all these years and discovers that there may be more to Donny's death than he originally thought.

== Television adaptation ==
The second season of the USA Network series Shooter (2016–2018), starring Ryan Phillippe as Swagger, is based on Time to Hunt.
