= David Benioff =

American writer and producer (born 1970)

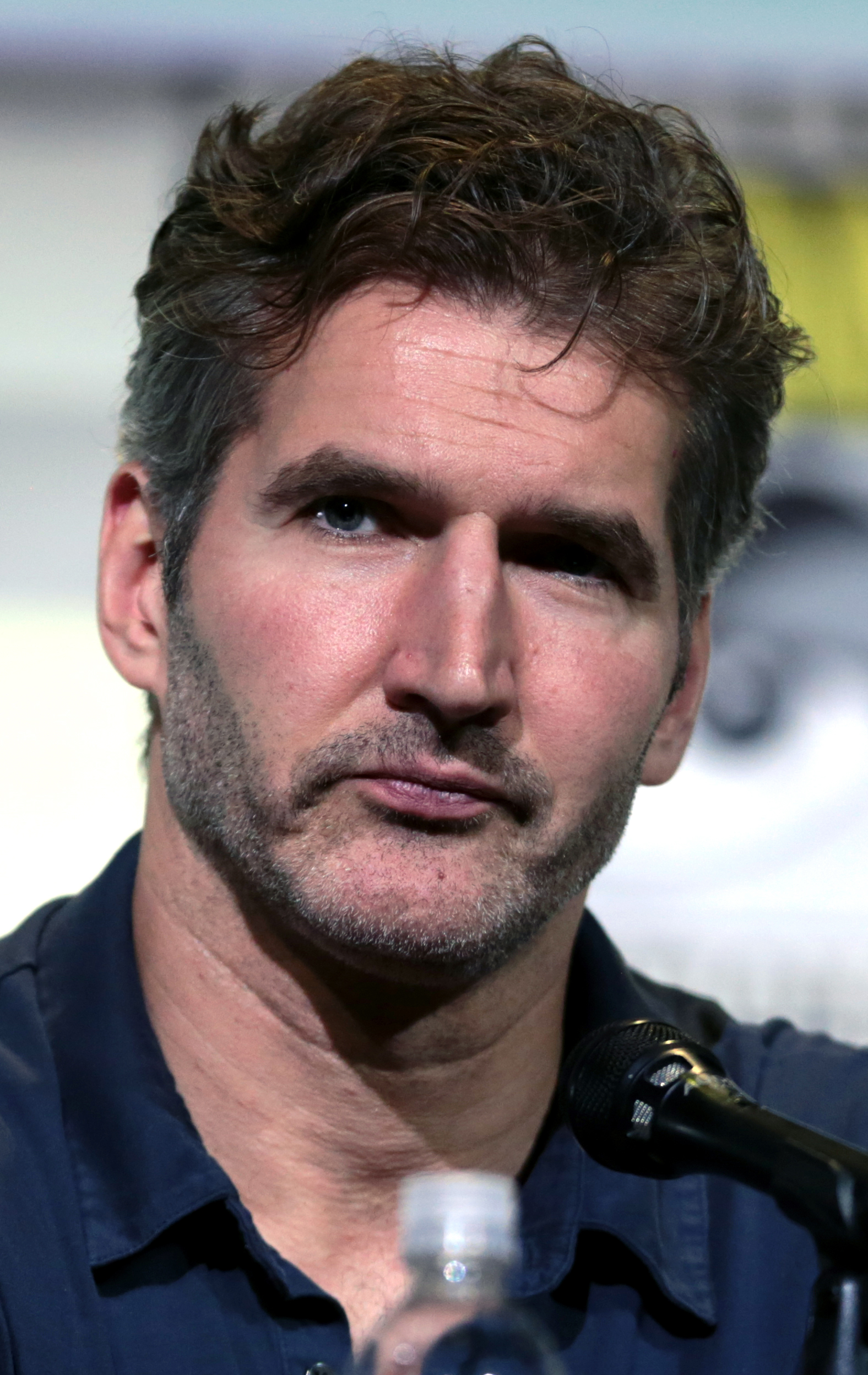
- Benioff in 2016
- Born: David Friedman; September 25, 1970 (age 56); New York City, US
- Education: Dartmouth College (BA); Trinity College, Dublin (MA); University of California, Irvine (MFA)
- Occupations: Screenwriter; television producer; novelist
- Years active: 2001–present
- Spouse: Amanda Peet (m. 2006)
- Children: 3
- Parent: Stephen Friedman (father)

David Friedman (/ˈfriːdmən/; born September 25, 1970), known professionally as David Benioff (/ˈbɛniɒf/), is an American novelist, screenwriter, and producer. Along with his collaborator D. B. Weiss, he is best known for co-creating Game of Thrones (2011–2019), the HBO adaptation of George R. R. Martin's series of books, A Song of Ice and Fire. He also wrote 25th Hour (2002), Troy (2004), The Kite Runner (2007), City of Thieves (2008), co-wrote X-Men Origins: Wolverine (2009), and Gemini Man (2019).

== Early life ==
Benioff was born David Friedman in New York City, the youngest of three children in a Jewish family with ancestral roots in Austria, Romania, Germany, Poland and Russia. He is the son of Barbara (née Benioff) and Stephen Friedman, a former head of Goldman Sachs. He grew up in Manhattan, first in Peter Cooper Village, then on 86th Street where he spent most of his childhood, before eventually moving near the UN headquarters when he was 16.

Benioff is an alumnus of Collegiate School and Dartmouth College. At Dartmouth he was a member of Phi Delta Alpha fraternity and the Sphinx Senior Society. After graduating in 1992 with a BA in English Literature, he had a number of jobs: for a time as a club bouncer in San Francisco, and as a high school English teacher at Poly Prep in Brooklyn for two years, where he served as the school's wrestling coach.

Benioff became interested in an academic career and went to Trinity College, Dublin (TCD), in 1995, for a one-year program to study Irish literature. In Dublin he met D. B. Weiss, who later became his collaborator. Benioff wrote a thesis on Samuel Beckett at Trinity College, but decided against a career in academia. He worked as a radio DJ in Moose, Wyoming, for a year—mostly as a side job that he accepted mainly to spend a year in the countryside at a writer's retreat. He then applied to join the University of California, Irvine's creative writing program after reading The Mysteries of Pittsburgh by Michael Chabon (an alumnus there), and received a Master of Fine Arts degree in creative writing there in 1999.

In 2001, People magazine included Benioff on its list of America's Top 50 Most Eligible Bachelors.

As an adult, he began using the pen name David Benioff when his first novel was published in 2001. Benioff is his mother's maiden name. He explained that he did this to avoid confusion with other writers named David Friedman. For legal purposes, his copyright filings from the 2010s onward list him as "David Benioff Friedman".

== Career ==
Benioff spent two years writing his first published novel, The 25th Hour, originally titled Fireman Down, and completed the book as his thesis for his master's degree at Irvine. He was asked to adapt the book into a screenplay after Tobey Maguire read a preliminary trade copy and became interested in making a film of the book. The film adaptation, 25th Hour, starring Edward Norton, was directed by Spike Lee. In 2004 Benioff published a collection of short stories, When the Nines Roll Over (And Other Stories).

He drafted a screenplay of the mythological epic Troy (2004), for which Warner Bros. pictures paid him $2.5 million. He also wrote the script for the psychological thriller Stay (2005), directed by Marc Forster and starring Ewan McGregor and Naomi Watts. His screenplay for The Kite Runner (2007), adapted from the novel of the same name, marked his second with Forster.

Benioff was hired in 2004 to write the screenplay for the X-Men spin-off X-Men Origins: Wolverine (2009). He based his script on Barry Windsor-Smith's "Weapon X" story, Chris Claremont and Frank Miller's 1982 limited series on the character, as well as the 2001 limited series Origin. Hugh Jackman collaborated on the script, which he wanted to be more of a character piece than the previous X-Men films. Fox later hired Skip Woods to revise and rewrite Benioff's script. Benioff had aimed for a "darker and a bit more brutal" story, writing it with an R rating in mind, but acknowledged the film's final tone would rest with the producers and director.

In 2006, Benioff became interested in adapting George R. R. Martin's novel series A Song of Ice and Fire, and began working with D. B. Weiss on a proposed television series, Game of Thrones. The pilot, "Winter Is Coming", was put into development by HBO in 2007 and the series greenlit in 2010. Benioff and Weiss acted as the show's executive producers, showrunners, and writers. It began airing on HBO in 2011. Benioff and Weiss had previously worked together on a script for a horror film titled The Headmaster, but it was never made. They also directed three episodes of Game of Thrones, flipping a coin to decide who would get the credit on the show. Benioff was given the credit for season 3 episode 3, "Walk of Punishment", while Weiss was credited with season 4 episode 1, "Two Swords". They co-directed the series finale, "The Iron Throne".

In October 2007, Universal Pictures hired Benioff to write an adapted screenplay of the Charles R. Cross biography of Kurt Cobain, but the screenplay was not used.

In 2008, Benioff's second novel, City of Thieves, was published.

In April 2014, Benioff announced he and Weiss had taken on their first feature film project to write, produce, and direct Dirty White Boys, based on a novel by Stephen Hunter. 21st Century Fox greenlit pre-production on the movie even though at the time, both producers had significant contractual obligations for other projects. Though it was assumed development on Dirty White Boys would proceed slowly, promotion for the film not only began slow but stopped altogether. According to Kasey Moore, it has been years since anyone once known to be involved with Dirty White Boys, has given an update on the project's status.

In July 2017, Benioff announced that he and Weiss would produce another HBO series, Confederate, after the final season of Game of Thrones. Benioff and Weiss said, "We have discussed Confederate for years, originally as a concept for a feature film, but our experience on Thrones has convinced us that no one provides a bigger, better storytelling canvas than HBO." The announcement of Confederate met with public animosity and as of August 2019 (when Benioff's and Weiss's deal with Netflix was announced) is not moving forward.

In February 2018, Disney announced that Benioff and Weiss would write and produce a new series of Star Wars films after the final season of Game of Thrones ended in 2019.

Towards the end of the final season of Game of Thrones, a petition to HBO was started on Change.org. It called Benioff and Weiss "woefully incompetent writers" and demanded "competent writers" to remake the eighth season of Game of Thrones in a manner "that makes sense". The petition eventually amassed over 1.5 million signatures. In the Chicago Sun Times, Richard Roeper wrote that the backlash to the eighth season was so great that he doubted he had "ever seen the level of fan (and to a lesser degree, critical) vitriol leveled at" Game of Thrones.

In early August 2019, Benioff and Weiss negotiated an exclusive multi-year film and television deal with Netflix worth $200 million. Due to their commitments to Netflix, Benioff and Weiss exited their contract to produce Star Wars films for Disney and Lucasfilm.

Benioff's and Weiss's first project on Netflix was to direct the stand-up comedy special Leslie Jones: Time Machine.

Benioff, Weiss and Alexander Woo wrote and executive produced the Netflix series 3 Body Problem.

== Personal life ==
On September 30, 2006, Benioff married actress Amanda Peet in a traditional Jewish ceremony in New York City. They have three children. The family divides their time between homes in Manhattan and Beverly Hills. He is a second cousin of software entrepreneur and Salesforce CEO Marc Benioff.

== Bibliography ==
Title	Year	Type	Note
The 25th Hour	2001	Novel	Paperback: 224 pages Publisher: Plume; Reissue edition (January 29, 2002); Language: English; ISBN 0-452-28295-0
When the Nines Roll Over (and Other Stories)	2004	Short story collection	Hardcover: 223 pages Publisher: Viking Books (August 19, 2004); Language: English; ISBN 0-670-03339-1
City of Thieves	2008	Novel	Hardcover: 281 pages Publisher: Viking Books (May 15, 2008); Language: English; ISBN 0-670-01870-8

== Filmography ==
=== Film ===
Year	Title	Writer	Producer	Director	Notes
2002	25th Hour	Yes	No	Spike Lee	Nominated— Boston Society of Film Critics Award for Best Screenplay
2004	Troy	Yes	No	Wolfgang Petersen	
2005	Stay	Yes	No	Marc Forster	
2005	When the Nines Roll Over	Yes	Yes	Himself	Short film based on a story from When the Nines Roll Over
2007	The Kite Runner	Yes	No	Marc Forster	Christopher Award for Best Feature Film; Nominated— Golden Globe Award for Best Foreign Language Film; Nominated— BAFTA Award for Best Adapted Screenplay; Nominated— Satellite Award for Best Adapted Screenplay
2009	X-Men Origins: Wolverine	Yes	No	Gavin Hood	
2009	Brothers	Yes	No	Jim Sheridan	
2019	Gemini Man	Yes	No	Ang Lee	
2022	Metal Lords	No	Yes	Peter Sollett	

=== Television ===
Year(s)	Title	Director	Writer	Executive Producer	Creator	Notes
2011–2019	Game of Thrones	Yes	Yes	Yes	Yes	Directed and wrote episodes "Walk of Punishment" and "The Iron Throne"; Wrote 45 episodes
2013–2017	It's Always Sunny in Philadelphia	No	Yes	No	No	Wrote episode "Flowers for Charlie"; Cameo as "Bored Lifeguard #1" (In episode "The Gang Goes to a Water Park")
2020	Leslie Jones: Time Machine	Yes	No	No	No	TV special; Co-directed with D. B. Weiss
2021	The Chair	No	No	Yes	No	
2024–present	3 Body Problem	No	Yes	Yes	Yes	Wrote 4 episodes
2025	Death by Lightning	No	No	Yes	No	

== Awards and nominations ==
=== Primetime Emmy Award ===
Year	Category	Recipient	Result
2011	Outstanding Drama Series	Game of Thrones	Nominated
2011	Outstanding Writing for a Drama Series	Game of Thrones	Nominated
2012	Outstanding Drama Series	Game of Thrones	Nominated
2013	Outstanding Drama Series	Game of Thrones	Nominated
2013	Outstanding Writing for a Drama Series	Game of Thrones	Nominated
2014	Outstanding Drama Series	Game of Thrones	Nominated
2014	Outstanding Writing for a Drama Series	Game of Thrones	Nominated
2015	Outstanding Drama Series	Game of Thrones	Won
2015	Outstanding Writing for a Drama Series	Game of Thrones	Won
2016	Outstanding Drama Series	Game of Thrones	Won
2016	Outstanding Writing for a Drama Series	Game of Thrones	Won
2018	Outstanding Drama Series	Game of Thrones	Won
2018	Outstanding Writing for a Drama Series	Game of Thrones	Nominated
2019	Outstanding Drama Series	Game of Thrones	Won
2019	Outstanding Writing for a Drama Series	Game of Thrones	Nominated
2024	Outstanding Drama Series	3 Body Problem	Nominated

=== Writers Guild of America Awards ===
Year	Category	Recipient	Result
2012	Drama Series	Game of Thrones	Nominated
2012	New Series	Game of Thrones	Nominated
2013	Drama Series	Game of Thrones	Nominated
2015	Drama Series	Game of Thrones	Nominated
2016	Drama Series	Game of Thrones	Nominated
2016	Episodic Drama	Game of Thrones	Nominated
2017	Drama Series	Game of Thrones	Nominated
2017	Episodic Drama	Game of Thrones	Nominated
2018	Drama Series	Game of Thrones	Nominated

=== Other awards ===
Year	Title	Award/Nomination
2011–2019	Game of Thrones	Hugo Award for Best Dramatic Presentation, Long Form (2012); Hugo Award for Best Dramatic Presentation, Short Form (2013–2014); Producers Guild of America Award for Best Episodic Drama (2015); Golden Nymph Awards for Outstanding International Producer (2012); Nominated—Producers Guild of America Award for Best Episodic Drama (2011–2014, 2016, 2018); Nominated—BAFTA for Best International Programme (2013); Nominated—Hugo Award for Best Dramatic Presentation, Short Form (2015, 2017); Nominated—USC Scripter Award for Best Adapted Screenplay (2016–2017); Nominated—Humanitas Prize for 60 Minute Network or Syndicated Television (2017)

== See also ==
- List of awards and nominations received by Game of Thrones
