= When the Nines Roll Over =

2004 short story collection by David Benioff

When the Nines Roll Over (and Other Stories)
- Hardcover edition
- Author: David Benioff
- Language: English
- Published: 2004 (Viking Books)
- Publication place: United States
- Media type: Print (Hardcover and Paperback)
- Pages: 223 pp
- ISBN: 0-670-03339-1

When the Nines Roll Over (and Other Stories) is a 2004 short story collection by David Benioff. A short film adaptation of the first of the seven stories, for which Benioff wrote the screenplay, directed, and produced, was released in 2005.

== Background ==
After the success of The 25th Hour, Benioff wrote collections of short stories that he would later release as a compilation in When the Nines Roll Over (and Other Stories). There is a total of seven short stories. The stories are When the Nines Roll Over, The Devil Comes to Orekhovo, Zoantrophy, The Barefoot Girl in Clover, De Composition, Garden of No, Neversink and Merde for Luck

== Plot ==
A collection of short stories. The first story, which is the title story (When the Nines Roll Over), is about a jaded hipster record executive who is trying to steal a talented and sexy young singer away from a small label. The other stories are varied, ranging from the tale of a young soldier ordered to execute an elderly woman to a drama about a lovesick young man's decision to secretly scatter his girlfriend's father's ashes.

== Reception ==
On Metacritic, the book received an 81 out of 100 based on 12 critic reviews, indicating "universal acclaim".

Publishers Weekly said When the Nines Roll Over is a "superb collection", that "each one is driven by fully formed characters" and that "it proves that Benioff can handle the long and the short of the fiction game."
