= Night of Thunder =

Night of Thunder may refer to:

- Night of Thunder (book), a 2008 thriller novel by Stephen Hunter.
- Night of Thunder (horse), a racehorse, foaled 2011, the winner of the 2014 2,000 Guineas Stakes.
