= Dirty White Boy =

Dirty White Boy may refer to:

- "Dirty White Boy" (song), a song by Foreigner
- Dirty White Boy (band), an American glam metal/hard rock band
- Dirty White Boys, 1994 crime thriller novel by Stephen Hunter
- Dirty White Boy, ring name of American professional wrestler Tony Anthony (born 1960)
