= I, Sniper =

2009 novel by Stephen Hunter

- Author: Stephen Hunter
- Language: English
- Series: Bob Lee Swagger series
- Genre: Thriller
- Publisher: Simon & Schuster
- Publication date: December 29, 2009
- Publication place: United States
- Media type: Print (hardback)
- Pages: 418 pp
- ISBN: 1-4165-6515-9 (hardback edition)
- Preceded by: Night of Thunder
- Followed by: Dead Zero

I, Sniper is a novel by Stephen Hunter, published by Simon & Schuster in 2009. It is Hunter's sixth novel whose hero is Bob Lee Swagger, a U. S. Marine Corps sniper who first appears in Point of Impact which is partially set in the Vietnam War. It is tenth in order of publication and sixth in the chronology of the character.

Bob Lee has been brought in as a consultant to analyze the data collected from the scene of the assassinations. He concludes that the shootings were not made by the accused perpetrator. When Carl Hitchcock turns up dead from an apparent suicide he decides to investigate further to clear a fellow sniper's name. Swagger begins investigating, by attending a demonstration of the supposed device used in the assassinations. The demonstration introduces a group of Irish soldiers who served in Operation Iraqi Freedom. The novel concludes with Swagger showing his ability to outlast and outwit his enemy in a duel of snipers, clearing the name of the fallen Hitchcock in the process. The ending includes seeming references to the song "Big Iron"

The characters include pseudonymous characters: Carl Hitchcock, a Marine Corps sniper based upon the real sniper, Carlos Hathcock. Other characters are based upon Ted Turner, Jane Fonda, Bill Ayers, and Chuck Mawhinney.
