= Black Light (novel) =

1996 thriller fiction novel

- First edition
- Author: Stephen Hunter
- Language: English
- Series: Bob Lee Swagger series
- Genre: Thriller
- Publisher: Doubleday
- Publication date: 1996
- Publication place: United States
- Media type: Print (hardback & paperback)
- Pages: 461 pp
- ISBN: 0-385-48042-3 (hardback edition)
- OCLC: 33404018
- Dewey Decimal: 813/.54 20
- LC Class: PS3558.U494 B53 1996
- Preceded by: Point of Impact
- Followed by: Time to Hunt

Black Light is a 1996 thriller novel by Stephen Hunter. It is the second novel in the Bob Lee Swagger series and the sequel to Point of Impact.

== Plot summary ==
There are two interconnected plots that unfold simultaneously in this novel; one is set in the present, and deals with Bob Lee Swagger and Russ Pewtie, while the other is set in 1955, and deals with Bob Lee's father, Earl, and the events leading up to his death.

This book catches the reader up with Bob Lee about five years after the events in Point of Impact. He now has a daughter who is four years old, named Nikki, and he has married Julie Fenn, the widow of his fallen spotter, Donnie Fenn. He is living happily, if not humbly, in Arizona, trying to avoid the notoriety he gained during the events in Point of Impact.

A young man approaches him with a proposition. This young man's name is Russ Pewtie, the grown son of Bud Pewtie, who as described in Dirty White Boys was responsible for the death of Lamar Pye. Russ is a writer, and wants to write a book about Bob Lee's father Earl, a Marine Corps veteran and State Policeman who was supposedly gunned down one night in 1955, near Bob's home town of Blue Eye, Arkansas, by Lamar's father, Jimmy who was to surrender to Earl after robbing a grocery store and killing four people.

As Russ and Bob Lee probe into the details surrounding Earl's death, there are some startling revelations, including a conspiracy to keep these details hidden, which give deeper insight into the history of Bob Lee. Bob Lee uses his knowledge of firearms, sniping and military history to unravel conflicting details about the shooting of his father and find out the real reason his father was killed as well as finding out the identity of the real shooter.

The plot involves several of Hunter's signature interconnecting characters (who appear in various roles in more than one of his novels). These include Sam Vincent, the former Polk County prosecutor who appears in Point of Impact, and Frenchy Short, the CIA agent and Earl Swagger protégé who appears in The Second Saladin, and also in the later Earl Swagger novels Hot Springs and Havana.

Part of the connection between the novel's two time periods is the role of Sam Vincent in the prosecution of the murderer of a young black girl in 1955, and the re-investigation of that case in the present.

== Television adaptation ==
The third and final season of the USA Network series Shooter (2016–2018), starring Ryan Phillippe as Swagger, is loosely based on Black Light.
