= The Devil and Daniel Webster =

1936 short story by Stephen Vincent Benét

- Short story by Stephen Vincent Benét
- Country: United States
- Language: English
- Genres: Fantasy, Dark Fantasy

Publication
- Published in: The Saturday Evening Post
- Publication type: Periodical
- Publication date: October 24, 1936

"The Devil and Daniel Webster" (1936) is a short story by American writer Stephen Vincent Benét. He tells of a New Hampshire farmer who sells his soul to the devil and is later defended by a fictionalized Daniel Webster, a noted 19th-century American statesman, lawyer and orator. The narrative references real events in the lives of Webster and his family.

The story appeared in The Saturday Evening Post (October 24, 1936) and was published in book form by Farrar & Rinehart the following year. The story won the O. Henry Award. The author also adapted it in 1938 as a folk opera, with music by Douglas Stuart Moore, a fellow Yale University alumnus.

== Plot summary ==
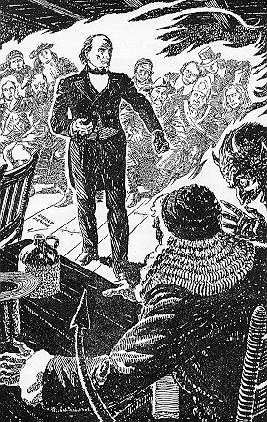
Webster argues while the devil whispers in the judge's ear. Illustration by Harold Denison.

Farmer Jabez Stone, from the small town of Cross Corners, New Hampshire, is plagued with unending bad luck. He finally says, "It's enough to make a man want to sell his soul to the devil!" The next day, he is visited by a stranger, identified as "Mr. Scratch", who offers to give him seven years of prosperity in exchange for his soul. Stone agrees.

Mr. Scratch comes for Stone's soul at the appointed time; Stone bargains for more years, but after that, Scratch refuses any further extension. Stone hires noted lawyer and orator Daniel Webster to get him out of the deal.

At midnight of the appointed date, Mr. Scratch and Webster begin their legal argument. It goes poorly for Webster, since Stone's signature and the contract are clear, and Mr. Scratch will not compromise.

Webster says: "Mr. Stone is an American citizen, and no American citizen may be forced into the service of a foreign prince. We fought England for that in '12 and we'll fight all hell for it again!" To this Mr. Scratch insists on his own citizenship, citing his presence at the worst events in the history of the U.S., concluding, "though I don't like to boast of it, my name is older in this country than yours".

Webster demands a trial as the right of every American. Mr. Scratch agrees after Webster says that he can select the judge and jury, "So long as it is an American judge and an American jury". A jury of the damned enters. They had all done evil, and had all played a part in the formation of the United States:

- Walter Butler, a Loyalist
- Simon Girty, a Loyalist
- King Philip, sachem of the Wampanoag people, who fought against the English
- Governor of Virginia Thomas Dale, known for his high-handed administration
- Thomas Morton, a rival of the Plymouth Pilgrims
- Pirate Edward Teach, also known as Blackbeard
- Reverend John Smeet (fictional character)

After five other unnamed jurors enter (Benedict Arnold being out "on other business"), the judge enters last. It is John Hathorne, who presided at the Salem witch trials.

The trial is rigged against Webster. He is outraged but calms himself, thinking "For it was him they'd come for, not only Jabez Stone".

Webster speaks passionately of how wonderful it is to be human and to be an American. He admits the wrongs done throughout the course of American history but points out that something new and good had grown from them and that "everybody had played a part in it, even the traitors". Humankind "got tricked and trapped and bamboozled, but it was a great journey", something that no demon could ever understand.

The jury announces its verdict: "We find for the defendant, Jabez Stone." They admit, "Perhaps 'tis not strictly in accordance with the evidence, but even the damned may salute the eloquence of Mr. Webster." The judge and jury disappear with the break of dawn. Mr. Scratch congratulates Webster, and the contract is torn up. The devil has overreached himself, agreeing to a jury trial out of pride in his unbreakable contract. But by doing so, he has put his contract within the reach of the Common Law used in the United States, under which a jury can enter whatever verdict it likes, regardless of the law. Webster's eloquence in swaying this supposedly unswayable jury is remarkable, but would have gone to no effect without the devil's pride-induced mistake in giving Webster a chance.

Webster then grabs Mr. Scratch and twists his arm behind his back, "for he knew that once you bested anybody like Mr. Scratch in fair fight, his power on you was gone." Webster makes him agree "never to bother Jabez Stone nor his heirs or assigns nor any other New Hampshire man till doomsday!"

Mr. Scratch offers to tell Webster's fortune in his palm. He foretells (actual) events in Webster's future, including his failure to become President (an actual ambition of his), the death of Webster's sons (which happened in the American Civil War) and the backlash of his last speech, warning "Some will call you Ichabod" (as in John Greenleaf Whittier's poem in reaction to Webster's controversial Seventh of March speech supporting the Compromise of 1850 that incorporated the Fugitive Slave Act, with many in the North calling Webster a traitor).

Webster asks only if the Union will prevail. Scratch admits that the United States will remain united after the war. Webster then laughs, "... and with that he drew back his foot for a kick that would have stunned a horse. It was only the tip of his shoe that caught the stranger, but he went flying out of the door with his collecting box under his arm... And he hasn't been seen in the state of New Hampshire from that day to this."

== Major themes ==
=== Patriotism ===
Patriotism is a main theme in the story: Webster claims that the Devil cannot take the soul because he cannot claim American citizenship. "And who with better right?" the devil replies, going on to list several wrongs done in the U.S., thereby demonstrating his presence in the U.S.. The devil says "I am merely an honest American like yourself – and of the best descent – for, to tell the truth, Mr. Webster, though I don't like to boast of it, my name is older in this country than yours."

Webster insists on a jury trial as an American right, with Americans for the jury and an American judge. The devil then provides the worst from Webster's perspective (and certainly, they are in Hell) examples of Americans for the judge and jury. In Daniel's speech "He was talking about the things that make a country a country, and a man a man" rather than legal points of the case. For Webster, freedom and independence defines manhood: "Yes, even in hell, if a man was a man, you'd know it."

This theme of American patriotism, freedom and independence is the explanation for Webster's victory: the jury is damned to hell, but they are American and therefore so independent that they can resist the devil. However, in reality many of the jury would not have classed themselves as Americans, as Governor Dale, Morton, Hathorne, and Blackbeard were English, and King Phillip was a Wampanoag. Butler and Girty would have called themselves Americans – and indeed were Americans – but they were Loyalists, and Webster might not have intended any but U.S. citizens. Classifying the jurors as "Americans" involves a wider definition, including all who had a part in its history – even those who lived and died as English subjects before 1775, the Loyalists who actively opposed the creation of the U.S., and those Indians (like King Philip) who interacted with the new civilization. Scratch underlines this definition by saying of the jury "Americans all".

=== Slavery ===
In his speech, Webster denounces slavery. Earlier, he states flatly: "A man is not a piece of property." Later, there is this description: "And when he talked of those enslaved, and the sorrows of slavery, his voice got like a big bell." Benét acknowledges the evil by having the devil say: "When the first wrong was done to the first Indian, I was there. When the first slaver put out for the Congo, I stood on her deck." As for Webster, "He admitted all the wrong that had ever been done. But he showed how, out of the wrong and the right, the suffering and the starvations, something new had come. And everybody had played a part in it, even the traitors."

The real Daniel Webster was willing to compromise on slavery in favor of keeping the Union together, disappointing some radical abolitionists, but he held that only the preservation of the Union could keep anti-slavery forces active in the slave areas. This desire to end the institution was a mainspring of his support for the Union.

=== Treatment of non-aboriginal Americans ===
The story may be seen as sympathetic to the plight of the aboriginal Americans. Webster states "If two New Hampshiremen aren't a match for the devil, we might as well give the country back to the Indians." The stranger/Satan remarks that "When the first wrong was done to the first Indian, I was there," which implies the author's acknowledgement that aboriginal Americans were sometimes wronged. "King Philip, wild and proud as he had been in life, with the great gash in his head that gave him his death wound" is noted as a notorious villain of American history (the historical King Philip (Metacomet), died from a gunshot to the heart, not a gash to the head).

Yet later on, Daniel Webster's appeal to the jury on "what it means to be American" specifically includes King Philip among "the Americans." This is an anachronism, as the historical Daniel Webster would have been unlikely to express such an opinion. The narrator also expresses sympathy for King Philip when he tells us that one juror "heard the cry of his lost nation" in Webster's eloquent appeal.

=== The devil ===
The devil is portrayed as polite and refined. When the devil arrives he is described as "a soft-spoken, dark-dressed stranger," who "drove up in a handsome buggy." The names Benét gives the devil – Mr. Scratch or the stranger – were both used around New England and other parts of the pre-Civil War United States: "Perhaps Scratch will do for the evening. I'm often called that in these regions." These terms are taken primarily from "The Devil and Tom Walker" (1824) by Washington Irving, who usually calls the devil Old Scratch.

== Adaptations ==
=== Screen ===
Two film adaptations have been made:

An Academy Award-winning 1941 film first released under the title All That Money Can Buy, starring Edward Arnold as Daniel, Walter Huston as Mr. Scratch, James Craig as Jabez Stone, and Simone Simon as Belle.

Shortcut to Happiness is a modernized version set in the publishing world, starring Anthony Hopkins as a publisher named Daniel Webster, Alec Baldwin as a best-selling (via the devil) but terrible author named Jabez Stone, and Jennifer Love Hewitt as a female version of the devil. This version was made in 2001, but was halted before completion, before finally being completed and given a limited release in 2007.

An animated TV film loosely based on the story, The Devil and Daniel Mouse, was released in 1978.

Phil Reisman Jr. adapted the story for a live televised performance of "The Devil and Daniel Webster" on the Breck Sunday Showcase (NBC, February 14, 1960, 60 min), starring Edward G. Robinson (Daniel Webster), David Wayne (Mr. Scratch), and Tim O'Connor (Jabez Stone). A color videorecording of the production aired two years later on Breck Golden Showcase (CBS, April 30, 1962).

=== Radio ===
Each of these adaptations used the original story title, unless otherwise indicated:

Charles R. Jackson's adaptation aired on Columbia Workshop (CBS, Aug. 6, 1938, 30 min), with music by Bernard Herrmann.

Edward Arnold, Walter Huston, and James Craig reprised their 1941 film roles in the "All That Money Can Buy" episode of Cavalcade of America (NBC Red Network, October 20, 1941, 30 min). Howard Teichmann and Robert L. Richards abridged and adapted the screenplay.

Jean Holloway's adaptation aired on Hallmark Playhouse (CBS, June 10, 1948, 30 min); cast: John McIntire (Daniel Webster), Alan Reed (Mr. Scratch), Frank Goss (Jabez Stone).

Edward Arnold again played Daniel Webster for the Prudential Family Hour of Stars (CBS, Sept. 18, 1949, 30 min).

Walter Huston again reprised his 1941 film role in the "All That Money Can Buy" episode of Theatre Guild on the Air (NBC, April 30, 1950, 60 min); Cornel Wilde and Martha Scott co-starred.

=== Stage ===
Benét adapted his story as a play, The Devil and Daniel Webster: A Play in One Act (New York: Dramatists Play Service, 1938), and also as a folk opera, The Devil and Daniel Webster: An Opera in One Act (New York: Farrar & Rinehart, 1939), music by Douglas Moore (Moore and Benét had earlier collaborated on an operetta, The Headless Horseman [1937], based on Washington Irving's short story "The Legend of Sleepy Hollow" [1820]).

Archibald MacLeish, a friend and associate of Benét's in the 1930s and until his death in 1943, also adapted the story as a play: Scratch (Boston: Houghton Mifflin, 1971). On Broadway very briefly, Scratch starred Will Geer in the title role and Patrick Magee as Webster. Originally conceived as a musical collaboration with Bob Dylan, the collaboration fell apart due to creative differences between Dylan and MacLeish. The show opened at Broadway's St. James Theater on May 6, 1971, and closed two days later.

== In popular culture ==
- In Treehouse of Horror IV of The Simpsons in "The Devil and Homer Simpson", Homer Simpson announces he would sell his soul for a doughnut, and the devil, who resembles his neighbor Ned Flanders, appears to make a deal with Homer. Homer tries to outsmart the devil by not finishing the doughnut, but eventually eats it and is sent to Hell; there he is "tormented" by being forced to eat thousands of doughnuts, an ironic punishment that backfires when he gleefully eats them without any sign of pain. A trial is held between Homer and the devil to determine the rightful owner of Homer's soul. Marge Simpson saves Homer's soul when she reveals that Homer gave her ownership of it, meaning that it was not in his possession when the deal was made.
- In an episode of the 1960s TV series The Monkees, this story was also presented in "The Devil and Peter Tork", wherein Peter finds a beautiful harp in a pawn shop run by Mr. Zero and says that he would give anything for it. Mr. Zero then has Peter sign a contract which condemns him by promising his soul to Mr. Zero. The boys become an overnight success after adding the harp to their act. They learn what has happened when Mr. Zero comes to collect Peter's soul and Mike argues that they will take it to court to fight the contract. The jury consists of 12 condemned men from Devil's Island and Judge Roy Bean, the hanging judge, presides over the trial. After Attila the Hun, Billy the Kid, and Blackbeard all testify to what Mr. Zero has done for their careers, Mike calls Mr. Zero to the stand and tells him that he did not give Peter the ability to play the harp and that it was within Peter the whole time due to his love for the harp. He then convinces Peter to prove it to Mr. Zero and everyone in the courtroom by playing the harp after Mr. Zero takes away the power. Peter then plays a rendition of the Monkees' song "I Wanna Be Free"; he is found not guilty and the case is dismissed. Peter is set free and Mr. Zero snaps his fingers and returns to Hell.
- Canadian studio Nelvana created an animated TV special called The Devil and Daniel Mouse based on the story. In the program, Daniel Mouse is a musician whose partner, Jan, sells her soul to the devil in exchange for fame.
- Two Chick Publications tracts, The Contract! and It's A Deal, borrow heavily from the story. The Contract! follows the original plot more closely (telling of a bankrupt farmer facing eviction), while It's a Deal features a young basketball player. In both stories, the soul-seller is saved not through a legal trial, but by accepting Christ as his saviour, since Christ has the power to redeem any soul regardless of a contract.
- In his court order rejecting plaintiff's motion to proceed in forma pauperis in the lawsuit United States ex rel. Gerald Mayo v. Satan and His Staff, 54 F.R.D. 282 (1971), Judge Gerald J. Weber cited this story as the sole, though "unofficial", precedent touching on the jurisdiction of U.S. courts over Satan.
- In the 1995 Tiny Toon Adventures TV special, Night Ghoulery, this story is parodied in the segment "The Devil and Daniel Webfoot".
- In the Supernatural episode "Captives", it is revealed that Crowley, the de facto king of Hell, rented several storage units under the alias "D. Webster" as a tongue-in-cheek reference to the short story.
- In the fifth episode of Tripping the Rift, the story is parodied under the title of "The Devil and a Guy Named Webster". When the lead character accidentally sells his soul to the devil, the crew then travel back in time to find Webster, but dial the wrong time zone and get a child actor who played a character called Webster.
- In the third episode of Chilling Adventures of Sabrina, a lawyer named Daniel Webster represents Sabrina in a trial plot loosely resembling the short story.
- In Leif Enger's critically acclaimed novel Peace Like a River, Reuben compares his brother Davy's trial to that of Jabez Stone and Mr. DeCuellar to Daniel Webster.
