= United States ex rel. Gerald Mayo v. Satan and His Staff =

United States federal court case

United States ex rel. Mayo v. Satan
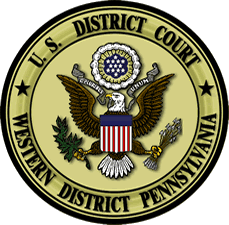
- Court: United States District Court for the Western District of Pennsylvania
- Full case name: United States ex rel. Gerald Mayo v. Satan and His Staff
- Decided: Dec. 3, 1971
- Docket nos.: Misc. No. 5357
- Citation: 54 F.R.D. 282

Court membership
- Judge sitting: Gerald Joseph Weber

United States ex rel. Gerald Mayo v. Satan and His Staff, 54 F.R.D. 282 (W.D. Pa. 1971), was a federal court case in which a prisoner filed a lawsuit in United States District Court against Satan and his servants. The case's class-action status was dismissed on procedural grounds.

== Complaint ==
Gerald Mayo, a 22-year-old inmate at Western Penitentiary in Pittsburgh, Pennsylvania, filed a claim before the United States District Court for the Western District of Pennsylvania in which he alleged that "Satan has on numerous occasions caused plaintiff misery and unwarranted threats, against the will of plaintiff, that Satan has placed deliberate obstacles in his path and has caused plaintiff's downfall" and had therefore "deprived him of his constitutional rights" in violation of the United States Code. Mayo filed in forma pauperis, that is, he asserted that he could not afford the costs associated with his lawsuit.

== Decision ==
With U.S. District Court Judge Gerald J. Weber sitting, the court first noted that jurisdiction was unclear and that it was doubtful Mayo stated a claim upon which relief could be granted. Additionally, while no previous cases had been brought by or against Satan and no official precedent existed, the court jokingly remarked that there was an "unofficial account of a trial in New Hampshire where this defendant filed an action of mortgage foreclosure as plaintiff," a reference to the 1936 short story "The Devil and Daniel Webster" by Stephen Vincent Benét. The court suggested that the Devil, who had claimed in that story to be an American, should he have appeared, might have been therefore stopped from arguing a lack of personal jurisdiction. In this context, the court noted that Satan was a foreign prince, but did not have occasion to address whether, if sued as a defendant, he would be able to claim sovereign immunity from suit.

The court noted that three of the four requirements for a class action suit were met, but it was unable to determine whether Mayo would adequately represent the class and therefore the case could not continue.

Finally, the court noted that Mayo had failed to provide directions to the United States Marshals Service as to service of process.

Citing the foregoing reasons, the court denied the request to proceed in forma pauperis.

== Precedent created ==
This case is used to teach law students the requirements necessary for the service of process. The textbook Civil Procedure: Cases, Materials, and Questions (8th Edition) cites the case in the third chapter, stating:

When the marshal's office does serve process, the plaintiff may be required to instruct the marshal on how to do so. In Mayo v. Satan & his staff, 54 F.R.D. 282 (W.D. Pa. 1971), the court dismissed the case because the plaintiff failed to render such aid when asking the marshal to serve the devil himself.

== See also ==
- Lawsuits against supernatural beings
