= City of Thieves (novel) =

2008 historical novel by David Benioff

- UK hardcover edition cover artwork
- Author: David Benioff
- Language: English
- Genre: Historical fiction
- Publisher: Viking/Penguin
- Publication date: 2008
- Publication place: United States
- Pages: 258 pp.
- ISBN: 0-670-01870-8

City of Thieves is a 2008 historical fiction novel by David Benioff. It is, in part, a coming of age story set in the World War II siege of Leningrad. It follows the adventures of two youths as they desperately search for a dozen eggs at the behest of a Soviet NKVD officer, a task that takes them far behind enemy lines. It was released by Plume on May 15, 2008.

The audiobook, narrated by Ron Perlman, was released by Penguin Audio on January 8, 2009.

== Plot ==
American screenwriter David is asked to write an autobiographical essay. He instead decides to write about Leningrad, where his grandfather grew up. He flies to Florida to speak with his grandfather, and for a week David records his grandfather's stories. David makes note of the fact that his grandmother never cooks.

The narrator changes to David's grandfather, Lev, on New Year's Eve 1942 in Leningrad, Russia. Food is scarce due to the German siege of the city. Though his mother and sister have fled the city, Lev, at 17, stays behind to work as a firefighter. One night while sitting on the roof of his apartment building with his friends, they spot a German soldier falling from the sky in a parachute and run down into the street to investigate. When the German lands in the street, the friends loot the corpse, with Lev taking the man's knife. Russian troops arrive and nearly arrest the group for looting but they all escape except for Lev, who is taken to a prison called the Crosses.

After hours in his pitch dark prison cell a young deserter named Kolya is put into the cell. Kolya tells Lev that he left his post to defend his thesis on Ushakovo's The Courtyard Hound, a book and author who Lev has never heard of. The next morning, Lev and Kolya are taken to a mansion occupied by the NKVD—the Russian secret police. There, Colonel Grechko tasks them with finding a dozen eggs to make a cake for his daughter's wedding.

Lev and Kolya try to purchase eggs at a black market, where a large man offers to sell them eggs from his apartment. At the apartment, Lev and Kolya discover corpses and realize that the giant and his wife are cannibals. Lev and Kolya narrowly manage to escape unscathed. Kolya and Lev spend the night at the apartment of Kolya's friend, Sonya, who lives with several young doctors. Lev sleeps that night in the living room and hears Kolya and Sonya have sex in the next room.

The following morning, Lev and Kolya investigate a rumor of an old man keeping chickens on a roof. They discover the corpse of the old man, and the old man's sickly grandson still guarding a chicken coop. The child initially refuses Lev and Kolya's offers of help but ultimately offers them the last chicken he has been keeping warm under his coat. They take the chicken back to Sonya's in the hopes it will lay eggs in time, until one of the doctors returns and explains that the "chicken" is actually a rooster.

The next morning Kolya wakes Lev and says they are going to walk to a poultry collective in Mga. As they walk, Kolya shares more about The Courtyard Hound and they discuss Lev's father, a famous writer who was killed by the NKVD. As night falls, Kolya admits they are going the wrong way. They find a farmhouse, and inside they see four teenage girls dancing. After a brief standoff with the girls, Lev realizes that the girls are being kept as sex slaves by members of a Nazi death squad called the Einsatzgruppen. When Kolya asks the girls why they have not fled, they are told of a young girl favored by the Germans who tried to run away, but was caught, tortured, and murdered by officer Abendroth. Lev and Kolya decide to kill the Nazis when they come later that night.

When the Nazis arrive that night, they are ambushed by Russian partisan fighters outside. Lev is intrigued to find that the partisans' best sniper, Vika, is a girl. Lev and Kolya follow the partisans to hunt Abendroth. As they walk, Kolya tells Lev more about The Courtyard Hound and Lev realizes the book is actually Kolya's own work in progress. That night, they hide at a safe house where Kolya confesses to Lev that he was actually accused of desertion because he spent New Year's Eve searching for a woman to have sex with, and failed to return to his unit in time.

The next morning, the Germans find the group. They all escape except for a partisan, who is killed in front of Lev. Vika decides they should infiltrate the group of prisoners with the Germans, and are successful, but the partisan leader Markov is recognized by a prisoner he once robbed and is killed by the Germans. When the company reaches a schoolhouse, the prisoners are placed in a shed to sleep, and the following morning they discover that the prisoner who betrayed Markov has been murdered. Kolya suggests that Vika most likely killed the man. A convoy of German vehicles passes the prisoners, and Vika points out Abendroth's car at the end of the convoy. Kolya, who speaks German, talks amicably with the Germans, and returns with a plan involving Lev challenging Abendroth, a chess fan, to a match.

That night, Abendroth calls for Lev, Vika, and Kolya. He agrees to a chess match, and adds a dozen eggs to the wager at Kolya's request. The three are searched but the young soldier who searches them misses their hidden knives. Lev positions his pieces for an inevitable victory, and while Abendroth is contemplating his next move, Lev takes the opportunity to stab Abendroth. He kills Abendroth and a soldier fighting Kolya, losing his left index finger in the process. Vika grabs the Germans' guns, Kolya grabs the box of eggs, and the three jump out the window and escape into the woods.

With Leningrad in sight, Vika asks Lev for his full name so she can find him later, kisses him, and leaves to find another group of partisans. When Lev and Kolya reach the defenses of Leningrad the next morning, the soldiers on duty shoot at them and hit Kolya in one of his buttocks. When the lieutenant realizes that Kolya and Lev are working for Colonel Grechko, he loads Kolya and Lev into a truck and heads quickly for the hospital, but in sight of the hospital the truck's path is blocked by tanks and transports. Kolya, suffering from the effects of blood loss, tries to tell Lev that everything's going to be fine and dies in Lev's arms. Lev delivers the eggs to Colonel Grechko, and discovers that Grechko has already procured three dozen other eggs.

The German siege is lifted in January 1944. In 1945, Lev is in his apartment when Vika knocks on his door with her suitcase and a dozen eggs. Lev suggests they make an omelet, but Vika says that she does not cook.

== Reception ==
The book was well received by most critics, including Jesse Berrett of SFGate and Boris Fishman of The New York Times. According to Jennifer Reese of Entertainment Weekly, "Benioff has produced a funny, sad, and thrilling novel. A−". However, Donna Rifkind of Los Angeles Times wrote that while the book "features a snappy plot, a buoyant friendship, a quirky courtship, an assortment of menacing bad guys, an atmosphere that flickers between grainy realism and fairy-tale grotesquerie and a grim but irrepressible sense of humor," it left her "thoroughly and discouragingly unmoved."

The novel was also a major artistic inspiration for the post-apocalyptic video game The Last of Us. The game's director Bruce Straley said, "It's nice to be inspired by [...] the right things. City of Thieves is an amazing book. Everybody should check that out." The book makes an appearance in the sequel, The Last of Us Part II, where the character Abby is seen reading the book. Abby, later in the game, meets a boy named Lev, who then becomes a major protagonist in her narrative arc.
