= Dirty White Boys =

Novel by Stephen Hunter

- Author: Stephen Hunter
- Language: English
- Genre: Crime, Thriller
- Publisher: Random House
- Publication date: October 1994
- Publication place: United States
- Media type: Print (Hardback & Paperback); Audio CD
- Pages: 496
- ISBN: 978-0-440-22179-1

Dirty White Boys is a 1994 crime thriller novel by American author Stephen Hunter. It covers the escape of convict Lamar Pye and two accomplices from a penitentiary in Oklahoma, and highway patrol officer Bud Pewtie's attempts to track them down.

The events in the novel are set in between Point of Impact and Black Light, the first and second novels in the Bob Lee Swagger series.

== Plot ==
The opening chapters of Dirty White Boys articulately sets an impressionable tone for the remainder of the novel, as the story's main antagonist, Lamar Pye, a physically powerful, charismatic, aggressive, and intelligent "alpha male" in his late thirties, uses brutal violence to avoid being raped by a giant black inmate in the showers at McAlester State Penitentiary (the Mac). Despite his position as a "Prince" (a ranking prisoner) amongst the Dirty White Boys, a white gang element of the prisoner populace, the rape was ordered as revenge for a slight made by Lamar's developmentally disabled, behemoth cousin Odell against the white gang chief. After his sale to the black inmate gang, Lamar knows that the revenge is inevitable if he remains in the prison. Richard, Lamar's failed artist cell mate, a timid man imprisoned for gruesomely blinding his own mother, joins Lamar as he uses his quick wit and unrestrained capacity for violence to abscond "the Mac" with Odell.

Bud Pewtie, the novel's main protagonist, is a State Trooper called to participate in the search for the escaped criminals. He is initially portrayed as a responsible father with two teenage boys, but it quickly emerges that he is having an affair with the young wife of his partner, Ted, a confused young man with unarticulated doubts about his role as a trooper. The troopers are briefed about the escape by the embittered alcoholic Oklahoma State Bureau of Investigation Lieutenant C. D. Henderson, a once star law enforcement officer who once served with Earl Swagger as a detective. A series of tips leads the troopers to the remote farmhouse of an old couple, where the Pyes and Richard have taken refuge, arming themselves with the old man's firearms. An ambush by the Pyes ensues, with Pewtie and Ted ducking for cover. While Pewtie performs distinctly well under fire of the Pyes, Ted caves under the pressure of the assault. As a result, Pewtie is severely wounded and left for dead by Lamar, and watches in horror as Lamar brutally executes his helpless partner.

The Pyes escape but Pewtie survives having been unknowingly shot by Lamar with lightweight bird hunting shot. The Pyes flee to the remote house of a mentally ill young woman, Ruta Beth Tull, who has been writing confused letters to Richard about their "mystic connection". Tull, it later emerges, murdered her own parents as a juvenile and sees this as her link to Richard. Tull immediately takes to Lamar and the group forms into a twisted family unit as the search for them loses momentum. Pewtie returns to the house where he was ambushed to thank the owner, who also survived being kidnapped by Lamar and raised the alarm about the shootout. While at the house he is given pictures of lions drawn by Richard, and overlooked by investigators, as Richard's value to Lamar rests on his ability to draw pictures as Lamar orders him to; Lamar being amused and intrigued by the artist's ability. Pewtie also returns to his affair with his dead partner's wife Holly and frustrations at the conflicting demands of his newfound romance and his family life continue to build.

Lamar and his "family" carry out a bloody robbery of a Denny's restaurant in Wichita Falls, Texas, from which Lamar narrowly escapes with his life. The bloodshed of the robbery intensifies the manhunt for Lamar and Pewtie is one of the officers who drops by the scene of the crime. There he finds more pictures of lions drawn by Richard at the restaurant. He is questioned by a suspicious Henderson about his find, but does not explain it or the earlier pictures. Lamar now reveals to his family that Richard has in fact been working on the design for a tattoo and they begin a search for a top quality tattoo artist to carry out the work and finding Jimmy Ky outside a small town. After discussing the drawings with a local art teacher Bud also begins to suspect that Lamar is working on a tattoo, and obtains information about Jimmy Ky. The stage is now set for the second bloody confrontation between Pewtie and Lamar. Pewtie literally stumbles in as Lamar is being tattooed and watched over by Odell. A gunfight ensues which ends with Pewtie killing Odell in a gun battle that only ends after Bud expends all his ammunition from his 3 handguns into Odell and blasting two fingers off Lamar's left hand. Pewtie himself is once again badly injured and Lamar escapes after the intervention of Richard and Ruta.

As Bud struggles with his choices Lamar plots a terrible revenge for the death of his cousin.

The stage is set for the final confrontation between Pewtie and Lamar. Pewtie fails at first to shoot Lamar with a rifle, his bullet deflected just enough by an unseen glass door to miss his intended target and wound Ruta. The firefight leads to Lamar breaking out of a window using Holly as a shield while running across the fields towards a patch of trees with Pewtie chasing. Holly breaks away from Lamar and runs back towards the house leaving Bud to face Lamar. Bud again confirms to Holly that they are through. Lamar ambushes Bud in the patch of trees but fails to shoot him with his final bullet; the two men begin a desperate hand-to-hand struggle for Bud's gun, which the physically stronger Lamar is sure to win. As the men fight, Pewtie desperately manages to fire a shot, which hideously wounds Lamar. The fight finishes as Bud uses his back-up gun to shoot Lamar twice in the head. As the medics and SWAT teams arrive all seems to be settled, but Richard is still alive and decides he should help Lamar. He finds Bud near a creek with the just-arrived Henderson. Both of the policemen talk quietly to Richard, trying to convince him to drop his gun and telling him that they know he was not responsible for the crimes committed by the Pyes. Richard responds by firing at Bud with the gun that Lamar took from Pewtie after their first confrontation at the old couples' farmhouse.

Henderson moves in front of Bud and takes the brunt of the bullet's damage, though the bullet hits Pewtie after going through Henderson. Bud is severely injured but lives as Henderson dies. The final scene is of a recovered Richard (having been shot by other policemen after firing) being transferred back to "the Mac" where he finds his previous fear of the prison and its brutal inmates is gone and he is a feared member of the criminal community.

== Film adaptation ==
In 2014, Fox commissioned David Benioff and D. B. Weiss to write, direct and produce a feature film adaptation of Dirty White Boys.

== Reception ==
Publishers Weekly celebrated the author in a star review stating "[p]owerful and gripping, this could be Hunter's most popular novel yet." Kirkus Reviews also delivered an adulation commenting: "[s]plendid, raunchy writing, which proposes that between the violently deranged and the unrelentingly lawful there dwells a variety of armed-to-the-teeth wistful bad guys that no one wants to meet."
