= Pale Horse Coming =

2001 novel by Stephen Hunter

- Author: Stephen Hunter
- Language: English
- Series: Earl Swagger
- Genre: Thriller novel
- Publisher: Simon & Schuster
- Publication date: 2001
- Publication place: United States
- Media type: Print (Hardback & Paperback)
- Pages: 608 pp
- ISBN: 0-684-86361-8
- OCLC: 47844428
- Dewey Decimal: 813/.54 21
- LC Class: PS3558.U494 P35 2001
- Preceded by: Hot Springs
- Followed by: Havana

Pale Horse Coming is a novel by Stephen Hunter published in 2001. It is his second book in the series featuring the character of Earl Swagger.

== Plot summary ==
In 1951, Arkansas attorney Sam Vincent is hired by Davis Trugood, a Chicago lawyer, to verify the death of the Trugood's client's manservant in Thebes, Mississippi, a desolate shantytown cut off from civilization and surrounded by swampland and seemingly impenetrable piney woods. While in Thebes, Sam is roughly arrested for challenging the legality and authority of Thebes' law enforcement and is imprisoned by the local Sheriff.

Earl Swagger travels to Thebes with the intent of rescuing Sam after he fails to hear from his friend for several weeks. He succeeds in securing Sam's freedom but is himself captured and incarcerated as the only white man among the inmates of the nearby Thebes penitentiary, a former timber plantation and current forced labor camp for negro convicts and run by ruthless and inhumane white supremacists. The mysterious and unnamed warden instructs his jailers to torture Earl, suspecting him to be a federal investigator interested in the secret workings of the camp. The other inmates apply their acquired hatred of white men to Earl, who must defend himself not only from the guards, but also from his fellow prisoners.

Earl escapes by faking his death with the help of an old prison trusty, promising to return and destroy the prison and the evil it represents. He assembles a group of six legendary gunmen (who are based on Elmer Keith, Jack O'Connor, Audie Murphy, Charles Askins, Bill Jordan, and Ed McGivern) with the promise of real action for a just cause and readies them for an assault on Thebes. While Earl makes his plans, the inmates at Thebes start to pass along the mysterious phrase, "Pale Horse Coming." Seeking to quell the inmates' stirrings and avoid a potential rebellion, the prison's tyrannical captain of the guards systematically tortures the prisoners in an effort to learn the origins of the phrase.

Sam Vincent, ever reluctant to resort to force to settle any matter, including the issue of Thebes, continues to investigate the mysteries surrounding the prison and makes some horrifying discoveries. After narrowly escaping a threat against his and his family's lives, Sam contacts Earl and finally gives Earl his blessing to "fire for effect." It is said that Vincent is never seen without a tie.

As the assault on Thebes begins, Davis Trugood, having arrived undetected in Thebes, enters the old plantation house and confronts the warden. The reader learns that Davis Trugood is the warden's estranged half-brother and that the warden hates Davis for being their father's son by a black woman.

Earl and his team succeed in destroying the prison, vowing to never again mention Thebes or their dealings there to each other or anyone else. They go their separate ways and Earl returns home to Arkansas and his wife and son.
