= John Wilson McIlvaine =

American judge

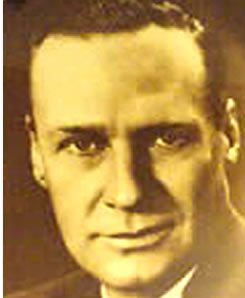

Judge of the United States District Court for the Western District of Pennsylvania
- In office August 1, 1955 – July 1, 1963
- Appointed by: Dwight D. Eisenhower
- Preceded by: Seat established by 68 Stat. 8
- Succeeded by: Gerald Joseph Weber

Personal details
- Born: John Wilson McIlvaine; June 22, 1907 Washington, Pennsylvania
- Died: July 1, 1963 (aged 56) Pittsburgh, Pennsylvania
- Education: Washington & Jefferson College (B.S.); University of Pittsburgh School of Law (LL.B.)

John Wilson McIlvaine (June 22, 1907 – July 1, 1963) was a United States district judge of the United States District Court for the Western District of Pennsylvania.

== Education and career ==
Born in Washington, Pennsylvania, McIlvaine received a Bachelor of Science degree from Washington & Jefferson College in 1928 and a Bachelor of Laws from the University of Pittsburgh School of Law in 1932. He was in private practice in Washington from 1932. He was in the United States Army Air Corps as a Lieutenant Colonel of the 7th Bomber Command during World War II. He was first assistant district attorney of Washington County, Pennsylvania from 1952 to 1953. He was the United States Attorney for the Western District of Pennsylvania from 1953 to 1955.

== Federal judicial service ==
McIlvaine was nominated by President Dwight D. Eisenhower on March 20, 1955, to the United States District Court for the Western District of Pennsylvania, to a new seat created by 68 Stat. 8. He was confirmed by the United States Senate on July 29, 1955, and received his commission on August 1, 1955. McIlvaine served in that capacity until July 1, 1963, when he suffered a fatal heart attack in his chambers on the 6th Floor of the Pittsburgh Federal Courthouse.

== Sources ==
Legal offices
Preceded by Seat established by 68 Stat. 8	Judge of the United States District Court for the Western District of Pennsylvania; 1955–1963	Succeeded by Gerald Joseph Weber
