= Shooter (2007 film) =

2007 American film by Antoine Fuqua

- Theatrical release poster
- Directed by: Antoine Fuqua
- Screenplay by: Jonathan Lemkin
- Based on: Point of Impact by Stephen Hunter
- Produced by: Lorenzo di Bonaventura; Ric Kidney
- Starring: Mark Wahlberg; Michael Peña; Danny Glover; Kate Mara; Elias Koteas; Rhona Mitra; Rade Šerbedžija; Ned Beatty
- Cinematography: Peter Menzies Jr.
- Edited by: Conrad Buff; Eric Sears
- Music by: Mark Mancina
- Production companies: Paramount Pictures; di Bonaventura Pictures
- Distributed by: Paramount Pictures
- Release date: March 23, 2007
- Running time: 124 minutes
- Country: United States
- Language: English
- Budget: $61 million
- Box office: $95.7 million

Shooter is a 2007 American action thriller film directed by Antoine Fuqua and written by Jonathan Lemkin, based on the 1993 novel Point of Impact by Stephen Hunter. The film follows Force Recon Marine Scout Sniper veteran Bob Lee Swagger (Mark Wahlberg), who is framed for murder by a mercenary unit operating for a private military firm. The film also stars Michael Peña, Danny Glover, Kate Mara, Levon Helm, and Ned Beatty.

Shooter was produced by Lorenzo di Bonaventura through di Bonaventura Pictures, and released by Paramount Pictures in the United States on March 23, 2007. The film received mixed reviews and grossed $95.7 million on a $61 million budget.

== Plot ==
Force Recon Scout Snipers Gunnery Sergeant Bob Lee Swagger and his spotter, Donnie Fenn, provide overwatch for a black ops mission in Ethiopia. The mission is successful, but while they cover the retreat of friendly forces, an attack helicopter assaults their position, resulting in Fenn's death. The CIA officer supervising the operation disavows the mission and strands them in enemy territory without any backup, though Swagger does unexpectedly survive.

Three years later, a retired Swagger is recruited by Colonel Isaac Johnson to help in preventing a possible assassination attempt on the US President at one of three upcoming public events in different cities. Swagger identifies Philadelphia as the most likely location for the attempt and pinpoints likely sniper spots.

Swagger joins Johnson at an overwatch position during the event; when he tells them it is time to take down the sniper, Officer Stanley Timmons of the Philadelphia Police Department, also at the position, shoots Swagger. At the same time, a gunshot kills Ethiopian Archbishop Desmond Mutumbo, who is standing two feet away from the President. Swagger jumps out a window to escape. On a nearby street, he disarms rookie FBI Agent Nick Memphis and tells him he did not shoot the President, before commandeering Memphis's vehicle and, with police in pursuit, driving it into the Delaware River; he escapes, dangling on a rope behind a barge. News reports are released naming Swagger as the assassin. Timmons is found shot to death, supposedly by a mugger.

Evading the authorities, Swagger travels to Kentucky and seeks out Fenn's widow, Sarah, who treats his injuries and agrees to help him. Memphis, suspicious of the circumstances, begins his own investigation. Swagger decides to use Memphis to draw Johnson out; he and Sarah discreetly feed Memphis information, furthering Memphis's investigation until it catches Johnson's attention. Johnson orders his men to kidnap and kill Memphis, but before they can stage his suicide, Swagger kills them, releases Memphis and secures his help in bringing Johnson down.

Swagger learns that he was used to conduct reconnaissance for wheelchair-bound Serbian sniper Mikhaylo Sczerbiak, who carried out the actual assassination using a remotely controlled gun. Johnson's team uncovers Sarah's connection to Swagger, and she is abducted by one of his henchmen.

Swagger and Memphis locate Sczerbiak on an estate in Virginia; he reveals that Johnson works for US Senator Charles Meachum on behalf of an oil conglomerate. Swagger and Fenn were unknowingly covering a PMC team who had massacred an entire village in Ethiopia to make way for a pipeline. Johnson recruited Sczerbiak to assassinate Mutumbo, who planned to expose the massacre in a speech he was about to give. Sczerbiak informs Swagger of Sarah's abduction, then commits suicide as the same PMC men who Swagger covered in Ethiopia, close in on the estate. With a recording of Sczerbiak's confession, Swagger and Memphis fight their way out and escape to Montana, tip off the FBI, and arrange a meeting with Meachum and Johnson.

Johnson and his men arrive with Meachum at the meeting on a mountaintop, with Sarah as a hostage. Memphis acts as a decoy, allowing Swagger to eliminate sharpshooters Johnson has deployed and rescue Sarah. Meachum tries to convince Swagger to work for him. Deducing that Sczerbiak's confession will get them murdered as witnesses, Swagger destroys the recording before the FBI arrives to arrest him.

Swagger requests a meeting with the US Attorney General at which he reveals that he replaced the firing pins of all his personal firearms, including the alleged murder weapon, and that they were therefore unusable. Johnson's men stole the rifle, retrieved a previously fired practice bullet and paper-patched it for Mutumbo's assassination to frame Swagger. Swagger's name is cleared, although there is no proof of Johnson's involvement in the attempt, and no legal action may be taken against him for the massacre, because it occurred outside the US.

As Meachum and Johnson celebrate the success of their operation, Swagger attacks the house they are in and kills them. He puts his weapon in the dead Johnson's hand to frame him as the killer and ruptures the gas line, causing a gas explosion. He leaves the scene in a car driven by Sarah.

== Cast ==
- Mark Wahlberg as Gunnery Sergeant Bob Lee Swagger
- Michael Peña as FBI Special Agent Nick Memphis
- Danny Glover as Colonel Isaac Johnson
- Kate Mara as Sarah Fenn
- Elias Koteas as Jack Payne
- Rhona Mitra as FBI Special Agent Alourdes Galindo
- Jonathan Walker as Louis Dobbler, Meachum's aide
- Louis Ferreira as FBI Assistant Special Agent-in-Charge Howard Purnell
- Tate Donovan as FBI Special Agent Russ Turner
- Rade Šerbedžija as Mikhayo Sczerbiak / Michael Sandor
- Alan C. Peterson as Philadelphia Police Department Officer Stanley Timmons
- Ned Beatty as Senator Charles F. Meachum
- Lane Garrison as Lance Corporal Donnie Fenn
- Brian Markinson as Attorney General Russert
- Levon Helm as Mr. Rate

== Production ==
=== Development ===
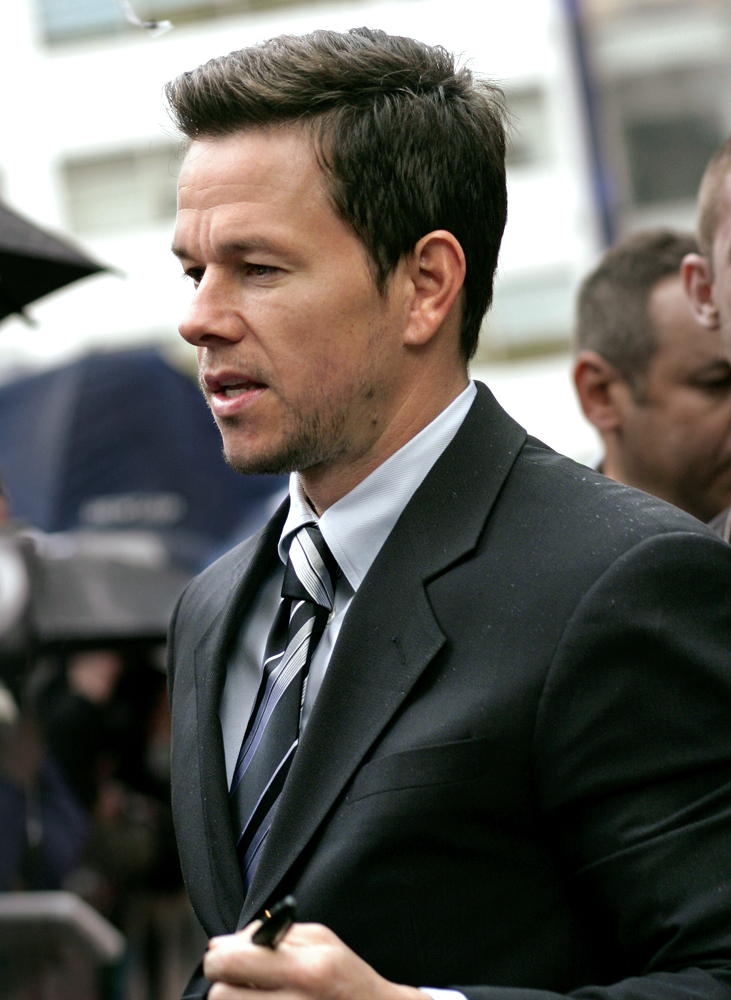
Wahlberg at the London premiere for Shooter

The novel Point of Impact was in development first at Universal and later at Paramount for twelve years, with seven screenwriters attempting many adaptations. The author Stephen Hunter also tried to adapt the book but was put off by the experience and disconnected himself from the process. In 2000, William Friedkin agreed to direct the film with Tommy Lee Jones starring as Bob Lee Swagger. However, the writers were unable to complete a script, and Friedkin and Jones decided to make The Hunted (2003) instead. That film incorporated many of Friedkin's ideas for Shooter, and its protagonist L.T. Bonham was also based on Jones's planned portrayal of Swagger. Friedkin expressed interest in additionally directing Shooter as a sequel to The Hunted, but ultimately did not.

Jonathan Lemkin read the book and some of the previous drafts and was able to avoid repeating some of the same mistakes. Lemkin updated the story away from the original post Vietnam setting, and restructured the story bringing the main event to the end of the first act, and to cut the multiple plot lines down to just the A story. His page 1 rewrite of the screenplay attracted Wahlberg and Fuqua, and on his second draft, the film got the green light to go into production. Unusual for a screenplay with such a long development process and multiple rewrites, Lemkin retained sole credit after Writers Guild of America arbitration.

=== Locations ===
Most of the film was shot on location in New Westminster, Kamloops, Mission, Ashcroft and Cache Creek in British Columbia, Canada. For example, Swagger's escape was filmed in New Westminster along the Fraser River, standing in for the Delaware River. The car chase that ends when it plunged into the river was filmed down 6th Street and off the Westminster Quay. The following scene of Swagger clinging to the side of a dredger was also filmed on the Fraser River near the Pattullo Bridge.

The assassination scenes were filmed in Independence National Historical Park in front of Independence Hall in Philadelphia. The sniper location was created using the exteriors of the church steeple at the junction of New Street and North 4th Street and combining them with an elevated view from another building to create a fictional vista of the park. The final scene was in Mammoth Lakes, California, in the lakes basin.

The mountaintop confrontation was shot on the glaciers of Rainbow Mountain, near the resort town of Whistler, British Columbia.

=== Weapons and tactics ===
Shooter depicts a number of sniper tactics, thanks to the guidance of former US Marine scout sniper Patrick Garrity, who trained Mark Wahlberg for the film. Garrity taught Wahlberg to shoot both left- and right-handed (the actor is left-handed), as he had to switch shooting posture throughout the movie, due to Swagger's sustained injuries. He was also trained to adjust a weapon's scope, judge effects of wind on a shot, do rapid bolt manipulation, and develop special breathing skills. His training included extreme distance shooting up to 1,100 yards (1,000 m), and the use of camouflage ghillie suits. Fuqua appointed Garrity as the film's military-technical advisor.

In the special features of the DVD, Garrity is interviewed pointing out that the shot fired in the assassination would not have hit the archbishop straight on, as in the film. When a round is fired it will fall from 30 to 40 feet (9 to 10 m) depending on the distance of the shot. To compensate, the round is fired at an arc calibrated by how far the round is going to fall, the distance of the shot, temperature, humidity, and wind. In his interview, Garrity said "At 2 yards (1.8 m), because of the hydrostatic shock that follows a large-caliber, high-velocity round such as the .408 Chey Tac (which is used in the shot), the target would literally be peeled apart and limbs would be flying 200 feet (60 m) away." The exit wound on the archbishop's head would have been too extreme to show in movie theaters. Instead, the movie depicts a much less graphic representation of the assassination.

Throughout the film, Swagger uses an array of sniper rifles, including the USMC M40A3, the CheyTac Intervention, and the Barrett M82.

== Music ==
The score to the film was composed by Mark Mancina, who recorded the music at the Todd-AO Scoring Stage in Studio City, Los Angeles, using a 77-piece orchestra conducted by Don Harper. A score soundtrack was released by Lakeshore Records and co-published by Shoelace Music on March 27, 2007. The song "Nasty Letter" by Otis Taylor plays over the end of the film and credits.

== Reception ==
=== Box office ===
Shooter grossed $47 million in the US and Canada and $48.7 million in other territories, for a total gross of $95.7 million against its $61 million production budget.

The film grossed $14.5 million in its opening weekend, finishing in 3rd at the box office behind TMNT ($24.3 million) and 300 ($19.9 million).

=== Critical response ===
On Rotten Tomatoes, the film holds an approval rating of 47% based on 152 reviews. The site's critics consensus reads, "With an implausible story and numerous plot holes, Shooter fails to distinguish itself from other mindless action-thrillers." Metacritic assigns the film a weighted average score of 53 out of 100, based on 33 critics, indicating "mixed or average reviews". Audiences polled by CinemaScore gave the film an average grade of "B+" on an A+ to F scale.

Manohla Dargis of The New York Times called the film "a thoroughly reprehensible, satisfyingly violent entertainment about men and guns and things that go boom." Dargis described director Fuqua's technique as overshot and overedited, but said he has a knack for chaos and the result is "pretty enjoyable." Kirk Honeycutt of The Hollywood Reporter gave a positive review but was critical of the weak characterization: "If the movie only lavished as much thought and care on its characters as it does on each intricate set piece, Shooter might have been a classic." Honeycutt says the problem is the screenplay by Jonathan Lemkin, and the source novel Point of Impact by film critic and author Stephen Hunter. He highlighted Peña for his performance, and praised the technical aspects of the film, particularly the stunt work, and the camera work of Peter Menzies Jr. Tony Horkins of Empire magazine praised the movie: "The sequel-ready Swagger challenges Bourne's supremacy with an impressive shoot-'em-up, work-it-out action drama".

Some film critics saw the film as left-leaning in its politics, including arguing that the main villain (Senator Meachum) is an analogy for then Vice President Dick Cheney.

== Home media ==
The DVD was released on June 26, 2007, reaching the top of the US sales charts. The film earned $57.6 million in DVD sales in the North America. Paramount Movies released the film on 4k Ultra HD Blu-ray on March 15, 2022.

== TV series ==
In 2016, USA Network picked up a series of the same name based on the movie, with Wahlberg as a producer and Ryan Phillippe as Swagger.

== See also ==
- List of assassinations in fiction
