= Night of Thunder (novel) =

2008 thriller novel by Stephen Hunter

- First edition
- Author: Stephen Hunter
- Language: English
- Series: Bob Lee Swagger series
- Genre: Thriller
- Publisher: Simon & Schuster
- Publication date: September 23, 2008
- Publication place: United States
- Media type: Print (Hardback)
- Pages: 304 pp
- ISBN: 1416565116
- Preceded by: The 47th Samurai
- Followed by: I, Sniper

Night of Thunder is a 2008 thriller novel, and the fifth in the Bob Lee Swagger series by Stephen Hunter.

== Plot ==
When his daughter Nikki, an investigative reporter, is seriously injured after her car is forced off a mountain road in Tennessee, Bob Lee Swagger hunts down those responsible for the accident. He unravels a criminal organisation disguised as a Baptist prayer camp and, with the help of Nick Memphis, his old pal from the FBI, thwarts their elaborately planned attempt to steal a cash truck right after a NASCAR race at the Bristol Motor Speedway.
