= Bob Lee Swagger =

Fictional United States Marine

- First appearance: Point of Impact
- Created by: Stephen Hunter
- Portrayed by: Mark Wahlberg (film); Ryan Phillippe (TV)

In-universe information
- Alias: Tyler Lee Young
- Nickname: Bob the Nailer
- Gender: Male
- Occupation: Former U.S. Marine Gunnery Sergeant Scout Sniper
- Family: Earl Swagger (father); June Swagger (mother)
- Spouses: Susan Swagger (maiden name unknown); Tien Dang; Julie Fenn-Swagger
- Children: Nikki Swagger; Miko Swagger (adopted); Ray Cruz (GySgt USMC); Mary Swagger
- Nationality: American

Bob Lee "the Nailer" Swagger is a fictional character created by Stephen Hunter. He is the protagonist of a series of 12 novels (as of 2022) that relate his life during and after the Vietnam War, starting with Point of Impact (1993) up to the most recent Targeted (2022). Swagger is the protagonist of the 2007 film and the 2016 TV series Shooter, each based on Point of Impact. Hunter has said that Swagger is loosely based on Carlos Hathcock, a U.S. Marine Corps Scout Sniper.

== Fictional character biography ==
Bob Lee Swagger is a retired Marine gunnery sergeant who was born in 1946 and raised in Blue Eye (a fictionalized version of Mena, Arkansas) in Polk County, Arkansas. He is the son of Arkansas State Trooper Earl Swagger, a retired Marine first sergeant and Medal of Honor recipient, and June Swagger. Bob Lee's father dies in 1955, but not before imparting an appreciation for firearms in his son, who harnessing a natural Swagger gift for firearms.

Swagger joins the Marines, forging a successful career as a sniper. He serves three tours in Vietnam, working with Special Operations, and earning the nickname "Bob the Nailer" for his uncanny ability with a rifle. Despite official credit for 87 combat kills, he has killed 391 men. His most notable engagement occurred when a battalion of the North Vietnamese Army were closing on a lightly defended Special Forces base. Swagger and his spotter, Lance Corporal Donny Fenn, delayed the battalion for two days until air support could arrive, killing more than 80 enemy troops before his ammunition ran out.

In Vietnam, Swagger was shot in the hip from 1,400 meters away by T. Solaratov, a Soviet sniper who killed Fenn soon after with a shot to the chest.

Swagger was retired by the Marine Corps in 1975, suffering from a permanent disability due to the hip wound. He became an alcoholic to numb his depression, which resulted in the break-up of his second marriage to Susan, and he retreated to a hermitic existence on family land near Blue Eye.

The events of Point of Impact begin at this stage of his life (1992), when he is approached by a clandestine organization who asks him to prevent the assassination of the President by a highly trained sniper, who he is told is the same sniper who shot him and killed his spotter Donny. Bob Lee later finds himself framed as the "lone gunman". With the help of Nick Memphis, an FBI agent assigned to the case, and attorney Sam Vincent, an old friend of Earl Swagger, Bob Lee clears his name and destroy the people who set him up.

He goes on to marry Julie Fenn, the widow of his spotter, and they have a daughter, Nikki Swagger. In Black Light, Swagger unravels a conspiracy behind the murder of his father.

In Time to Hunt, Swagger solves the mystery of his spotter's death, which culminates in a duel with Solaratov. This novel also depicts a portion of his service in the Vietnam War.

The fourth Bob Lee Swagger novel, The 47th Samurai, was published on September 11, 2007. In this novel, Swagger travels to Japan to return a samurai sword recovered by his father in World War II to its rightful owner, but quickly finds himself wrapped up in yet another deadly plot. This novel reveals the story of Earl's tour of duty on Iwo Jima.

The fifth novel, Night of Thunder, was published in 2008. In this novel Swagger, now 63 years old, is trying to find out who ran his 24-year-old daughter Nikki off the road in an attempt on her life. Set in NASCAR country and centered around the big race at Bristol, the novel features Grumleys from Hunter's Hot Springs. Once again Swagger finds himself hunting the hunters and at his advanced age is still shooting straight and fast. He makes his way through Malvern and Sheridan.

The sixth novel, I, Sniper, was published in 2009. In this novel, the FBI enlists Swagger's help in investigating the murders of several prominent 1960s Vietnam War protesters. Although the evidence initially points to former Marine sniper Carl Hitchcock (based on Carlos Hathcock), Bob Lee quickly discovers that Hitchcock was framed for the murders and sets out to find the real killer. His investigation takes him into the world of modern military sniper warfare, which technology has altered greatly since his days in Vietnam.

The seventh Bob Lee Swagger novel, Dead Zero, released December 28, 2010, and is set in the Global War on Terrorism. Marine sniper Ray Cruz is betrayed on a mission to assassinate Ibrahim Zarzi, also known as "the beheader", who becomes a prospective Afghan presidential candidate. Zarzi professes loyalty to the U.S. after attempts on his life, but Cruz resurfaces to complete the mission. Swagger is brought in as a consultant by request of Assistant Director Nick Memphis, friendly with Swagger since the events of Point of Impact, and Central Intelligence Agency (CIA) agent Susan Okada, of The 47th Samurai. Swagger is asked to help find Cruz, but along the way becomes sympathetic to Cruz and doubts his guilt. Later it is revealed that Cruz is Swagger's son, byproduct of a previously unknown marriage to a Vietnamese woman who was killed during the Tet Offensive. The loss of his wife and disappearance of the baby, it is theorized, motivated Swagger to take a third tour of duty, this time as a sniper, and establishing his legend.

In Dead Zero, Swagger moves from action hero to detective and strategist. Other elements in Dead Zero new to the Bob Lee Swagger novels are the inclusion of private security contractors and their presence in Operation Enduring Freedom in Afghanistan. One of the plot elements is a three-man team referred to as "unidentified contractor team". They use the Barrett M82 sniper rifle, which was originally introduced in Night of Thunder by its Army designation, the Barrett M107. Other devices new in this series are a miniature transponder called an "active RFID" or RFID tag. The use of "drones" (remote controlled unmanned aerial vehicles) is also new in this novel, and on the final page of the novel, Swagger is figuratively seen as using a drone for a sniper kill. The term "dead zero" in sniper and precision shooting usage refers to the desirable state of affairs where after several trial shots (called "ranging shots") the horizontal part of the cross-hair on the reticle has been adjusted for the distance and elevation of the target, and the vertical part of the cross-hair has been adjusted for windage, and so the crossing of the two in the field of view of the shooter corresponds to the anticipated point of impact. The cross-hairs meet on the target just as one sees on movie and TV use of telescopic sights.

In The Third Bullet, the eighth Bob Swagger novel, Bob Lee attempts to unravel the mystery behind the Kennedy assassination from a sniper's point of view and utilizes his unique skill-set to question several actual details from the Warren Commission, etc.

In Sniper's Honor, the ninth Bob Swagger novel, Bob Lee teams with a newspaper reporter to uncover the fate of a World War II female Russian sniper known as the White Witch. Also unearthed is a plot to attack Israel with newly manufactured Zyklon B poison gas. The story jumps between 1944 and present day, with most of it set in Ukraine. Bob Lee once again takes on the role of shooter as well as detective.

G Man, released in 2017, is the tenth novel in the series. It concerns a 71-year-old Swagger attempting to uncover the history of his grandfather Charles Fitzgerald Swagger. Charles, a veteran of the Canadian and U.S. armies during World War I, retired as a U.S. Army major and returned to become the Sheriff of Polk County, Arkansas. Bob and Nick Memphis uncover his secret work as an FBI agent during which he helped hunt down several famous bank robbers in 1934, then suffered a downfall.

Other books in the Bob Lee Swagger series:

- Game of Snipers (2019)
- Targeted (2021)Books related to Bob Lee Swagger Series
- The Bullet Garden: An Earl Swagger Novel

== Shooter (adaptations) ==
Point of Impact is the basis for the movie Shooter, starring Mark Wahlberg as Swagger. The film takes place in present day, with many of the circumstances updated to a contemporary setting.

A TV adaptation also entitled Shooter aired for three seasons, from 2016 to 2018. Ryan Phillippe stars as Swagger.

== See also ==
- List of films featuring the United States Marine Corps
