= Havana (novel) =

2003 novel by Stephen Hunter

- First edition
- Author: Stephen Hunter
- Language: English
- Series: Earl Swagger
- Genre: Thriller novel
- Publisher: Simon & Schuster
- Publication date: 2003
- Publication place: United States
- Media type: Print (hardback & paperback)
- Pages: 416 pp
- ISBN: 0-7432-3808-7
- OCLC: 52601404
- Dewey Decimal: 813/.54 22
- LC Class: PS3558.U494 H38 2003
- Preceded by: Pale Horse Coming

Havana is a novel by the author Stephen Hunter. The third novel in the Earl Swagger series, it was released by Simon & Schuster in 2003. The story is set in Cuba during the emergence of Fidel Castro.

== Plot ==
Earl Swagger is recruited as a personal bodyguard for an Arkansas politician who is visiting Havana, Cuba. Swagger is met by Frenchy Short who is now a CIA intelligence officer in Cuba and is coerced into a black bag operation to assassinate Castro. Along comes an unnamed former inmate from the Gulag to help the young Castro with wisdom and encouragement for the Communist interests.

After the historical attack on the military barracks in the failed attempt by Castro to take over the country, Swagger is put on the trail. He tracks and finds his target only to abandon the mission due to the shady nature of his former subordinate. Left to fend for himself in a country that no longer tolerates Americans, Swagger must evade and survive to return home to his wife June and son Bob Lee.

Swagger is given a safe haven by a Havana prostitute whose life he saved. The Gulag inmate appears again to offer him transportation back to Florida, but when Swagger realizes that the prostitute's life is in danger he must return to Havana for a final showdown.

While Swagger has been away, Bob Lee has been at home spending days at a time refining his marksmanship ability, thinking his father's absence is due to him unable to shoot a deer at the opening of the story. Bob Lee meets his father walking along the road on his way back home from his daily target practice, and is eager to tell him all about his newfound ability to shoot.
