= The 25th Hour =

2001 novel by David Benioff

- Author: David Benioff
- Language: English
- Published: 2001 (Carroll & Graf Publishers)
- Publication place: United States
- Media type: Print (hardback & paperback)
- Pages: 224 pp
- ISBN: 0-7867-0772-0
- OCLC: 45482019
- Dewey Decimal: 813/.6 21
- LC Class: PS3552.E54425 A614 2000

The 25th Hour is the 2001 debut novel by David Benioff. A film adaptation, for which Benioff wrote the screenplay, was directed by Spike Lee and released in 2002.

== Background ==
The idea for the book came when Benioff returned home to New York for Passover, while he was away working in Wyoming. He suffered from appendicitis and had to undergo emergency surgery. Benioff said: "Walking the halls of Mount Sinai afterward, seeing people walking up 5th Avenue and Central Park and trapped in the hospital, I had a sense of being so close to the city and not being a part of it." He continued: "I thought, 'What if you are not stuck for five days, but seven years?' And that is writing what you don't know. Taking a banal problem and making it much more serious."

Benioff spent two years writing the novel, and completed the book as his thesis for a Master of Fine Arts degree in creative writing at the University of California Irvine in 1999. The book was originally titled Fireman Down, but was changed to The 25th Hour on the advice of the publisher who accepted the book with a $7,500 advance. The book was published in 2001.

== Plot ==
New York drug dealer Monty Brogan is arrested for drug possession with intent to sell, and sentenced to seven years in prison. He spends his last night of freedom with two friends, contemplating his uncertain future and the decisions he made that brought him to this point.

== Reception ==
Publishers Weekly said The 25th Hour was "brilliantly conceived, this gripping crime drama boasts dead-on dialogue, chiaroscuro portraits of New York's social strata and an inescapable crescendo of tension." Bookseller said that it had "powerful characterization and dialogue." Entertainment Weekly rated it an A-minus, saying that Benioff "shows a knack for critiquing his genre while revitalizing its cliches" and the novel "achieves both pathos and excitement."

== Adaptations ==
Actor and producer Tobey Maguire read a preliminary trade copy of the book and became interested in making a film from it. He purchased the rights and asked Benioff to write the screenplay.

The film was entitled 25th Hour (2002), starring Edward Norton and directed by Spike Lee. Filmed and released after the 9/11 attack, it has numerous references to it through Lee's work; he reflects on the effect on the city and its residents.
