= I, Ripper =

2015 novel by Stephen Hunter

- Author: Stephen Hunter
- Language: English
- Genre: Fiction, thriller
- Published: 2015
- Publisher: Simon & Schuster
- Publication place: United States
- Pages: 309
- ISBN: 1-476-76485-9

I, Ripper is a 2015 novel by the American author Stephen Hunter.

== Plot ==
A fictional diary of serial killer Jack the Ripper interleaved with a narrative from a newspaper journalist, Jeb, reporting on the killings.
