= Stephen Hunter =

American novelist, essayist, and Pulitzer Prize-winning film critic

- Born: March 25, 1946 (age 80); Kansas City, Missouri, U.S.
- Education: Northwestern University (BA)
- Occupations: Novelist; essayist; film critic
- Writing career
- Period: 1971–present
- Genre: Thrillers
- Subjects: Film, handguns
- Notable work: Point of Impact (1993)
- Notable awards: Pulitzer Prize for film criticism

Stephen Hunter (born March 25, 1946) is an American novelist, essayist, and film critic.

== Life and career ==
Hunter was born in Kansas City, Missouri, and grew up in Evanston, Illinois. His father was Charles Francis Hunter, a Northwestern University speech professor who was murdered in 1975 by two male prostitutes. His mother was Virginia Ricker Hunter, a writer of children's books. After graduating from Northwestern in 1968 with a degree in journalism, he was drafted for two years into the United States Army. He served in the 3rd U.S. Infantry Regiment in Washington, D.C., a unit that has both operational and ceremonial missions, the latter most notably being the guard force for the Tomb of the Unknown Soldier. He also wrote for a military paper, the Pentagon News.

He joined The Baltimore Sun in 1971, working at the copy desk of the newspaper's Sunday edition for a decade. He became its film critic in 1982, a post he held until moving to The Washington Post in the same function in 1997. In 1998 Hunter won the American Society of Newspaper Editors Distinguished Writing Award in the criticism category, and in 2003 he received the Pulitzer Prize for Criticism. He accepted a buyout from the Post in 2008.

Hunter's thriller novels include Point of Impact (filmed as Shooter), Black Light and Time to Hunt, which form a trilogy featuring Vietnam War veteran and sniper Bob "the Nailer" Swagger. The story of Bob Lee Swagger continued with The 47th Samurai (2007), Night of Thunder (2008), I, Sniper (2009), Dead Zero (2010), The Third Bullet (2013), Sniper's Honor (2014) and G-Man (2017). The series has led to two spin-off series: Hot Springs, Pale Horse Coming, and Havana form another trilogy centered on Bob Swagger's father, Earl Swagger, while Soft Target (2011) focuses on Bob's long-unknown son, Ray Cruz.

Hunter has written three non-fiction books: Violent Screen: A Critic's 13 Years on the Front Lines of Movie Mayhem (1995), a collection of essays from his time at The Sun; American Gunfight (2005), an examination of the November 1, 1950 attempted assassination of Harry S. Truman; and Now Playing at the Valencia (2005), a collection of pieces from The Washington Post. Hunter has also written a number of non-film-related articles for The Post, including one on Afghanistan: "Dressed To Kill—From Kabul to Kandahar, It's Not Who You Are That Matters, but What You Shoot" (2001).

Hunter is a firearms enthusiast, well known in the gun community for firearm detail in many of his works of fiction. He himself shoots as a hobby, saying "many people don't understand, shooting a firearm is a sensual pleasure that's rewarding in and of itself."

In an interview with NPR on February 16, 2011, Hunter defended the public availability of high-capacity magazines after the shooting of Gabrielle Giffords and 18 others. He also said that it was not clear whether the 33-round magazine used by shooter Jared Lee Loughner played a part in the shooting. He had previously written in The Washington Post that extended magazines are particularly valuable to women and the elderly, who he said could use them effectively in semi-automatic rifles or shotguns. He points out that "women generally don't care to put in the training needed to master [rifles and shotguns]. Nor can the elderly handle [long guns] adeptly."

Following the killing of Osama bin Laden in 2011, Hunter wrote an essay bitterly attacking President Barack Obama.

== Works ==
=== Novels ===
Bob Lee Swagger series:

1. Point of Impact (1993)
2. Black Light (1996)
3. Time to Hunt (1998)
4. The 47th Samurai (2007)
5. Night of Thunder (2008)
6. I, Sniper (2009)
7. Dead Zero (2010)
8. The Third Bullet (2013)
9. Sniper's Honor (2014)
10. G-Man (2017)
11. Game of Snipers (2019)
12. Targeted (2022)

Earl Swagger series:

1. Hot Springs (2000)
2. Pale Horse Coming (2001)
3. Havana (2003)
4. The Bullet Garden (January 24, 2023)

Ray Cruz series:

1. Dead Zero (2010)
2. Soft Target (2011)

Stand-alones:

- The Master Sniper (1980)
- The Second Saladin (1982)
- Target (1985), novelization of film Target
- The Spanish Gambit (reissued as Tapestry of Spies) (1985)
- The Day Before Midnight (1989)
- Dirty White Boys (1994)
- I, Ripper (2015)
- Basil's War (2021)

=== Short stories ===
- "Casey at the Bat" (2010) (in Agents of Treachery, edited by Otto Penzler)

=== Non-fiction ===
- Violent Screen: A Critic's 13 Years on the Front Lines of Movie Mayhem (1996)
- Now Playing at the Valencia: Pulitzer Prize-Winning Essays on Movies (2005)
- American Gunfight: The Plot to Kill Harry Truman and the Shoot-out that Stopped It (2005) with John Bainbridge Jr., ISBN 0743281950
