= Point of Impact (novel) =

1993 conspiracy thriller novel

- First edition
- Author: Stephen Hunter
- Language: English
- Series: Bob Lee Swagger series
- Genre: Thriller, conspiracy fiction
- Publisher: Bantam Dell
- Publication date: March 1993
- Publication place: United States
- Media type: Print (Hardback & Paperback)
- Pages: 451 pp
- ISBN: 0-553-07139-4 (hardback edition)
- OCLC: 26633980
- Dewey Decimal: 813/.54 20
- LC Class: PS3558.U494 P65 1993
- Followed by: Black Light

Point of Impact is a 1993 thriller novel by Stephen Hunter. It revolves around a former Vietnam War sniper named Bob Lee Swagger or Bob "the Nailer". This character is loosely based upon the real Vietnam War sniper and U.S. Marine Corps legend Carlos Hathcock. Hunter wrote twelve novels featuring him as the main character.

== Plot ==
Bob "The Nailer" becomes involved in a plot by dirty big-government types. The story is about how he is first approached and used by them, and their subsequent attempts to end his life.

Disenchanted with warfare when invalided out of the U.S. Marine Corps in the 1970s, Bob retreats to a small town in Arkansas, where he lives in a trailer and devotes himself to firearms.

Here he is approached by representatives of RamDyne, a black-bag government organization whose personnel commit off-the-record atrocities as needed. The RamDyne people, masquerading as employees of Accutech, a high-end ammo manufacturer, enlist Bob's help. He detects their untruthfulness and confronts them, at which point they "reveal" to him their true motives: foiling an attempt on the life of the President of the United States at the hand of the same Soviet sniper who ended Bob's military career.

Bob agrees to work for them but in the end, is framed for attempted assassination. He escapes the subsequent apprehension attempt and finds himself friendless, pursued by every law enforcement agency in the country, RamDyne personnel, and suffering two near-fatal bullet wounds.

The major portion of the book details how he escapes the frame-up, wins absolution for the crime of which he was accused, and wins the love of a woman.

=== Conspiracy hints ===
As the story progresses, the reader is introduced to the actual shooter who took the shot at the Salvadoran Archbishop: one Lon Scott. Lon is a crippled man, who was once a great competition benchrest shooter. Bob tracks Lon by tracing the .300 H&H Swagger is given at the Accutech shooting range to Lon's father, Art Scott. Art received the .300 H&H, referred to as "The Tenth Black King", as a gift for his shooting for Winchester. In a tragic twist of fate, Art accidentally shot his son, crippling Lon from the waist down. He then proceeded to take his own life, with the same rifle. Bob hunts through some old files, and with Nick Memphis's help manages to track Lon to his home. Bob and Memphis are then ambushed, but escape. Much later in the novel, Lon makes another appearance as Colonel Shreck tries to set Bob up in Hard Bargain Valley, near the end of the book. Nick Memphis ends up taking a thousand yard shot at Lon, subsequently killing him. Bob then goes through legal proceedings, and embarrasses the United States government. The careful reader will then notice, during a description of the distribution of Lon's possessions in accordance with his will, that there was found a "curious collection of fired 162-grain .264-caliber bullets from some bizarre project or other in the early sixties, found in his safe deposit box." After some research, it can be learned that this is an allusion to the assassination of John F. Kennedy, in 1963. The rifle that supposedly fired the bullet that killed Kennedy was alleged to be a Carcano rifle, firing a 162 grain bullet, in 6.5 mm. It can thus be inferred that Bob Lee Swagger is not the only man that Lon Scott has set up, and that Lon Scott actually shot JFK on November 22, 1963, rather than Lee Harvey Oswald. In 2013, Hunter followed up on these hinted at threads and completed the tale in The Third Bullet.

== Inspiration ==
In the 2007 film adaptation DVD special features short titled "Survival of the Fittest: The Making of Shooter", the author states

I wanted to write a novel about a sniper. I'd read a biography of Carlos Hathcock, a Marine sniper. It's a very provocative book. It struck me that he was kind of the Faustian intellectual of war, in the sense that he learned things that no man ever learned, but at great cost. And the cost was his exile and his bitterness and his grief. Carlos Hathcock lost a spotter in Vietnam. So, I had Bob lose a spotter in Vietnam. Of course, the movie has been updated, so Vietnam hasn't figured in it. But there's still - I love that the sniper is a man of grief, with something that I don't think anybody had ever gotten before.

== Film and television adaptation ==
A film adaptation of the novel was produced by Paramount Pictures in 2006, titled Shooter, starring Mark Wahlberg as Bob Lee Swagger. It was released on March 23, 2007. In January 2016, USA Network gave a series order for Shooter, a television series starring Ryan Phillipe, based on the novel and the 2007 film.
