= Japanese detective fiction =

Japanese literary genre

Japanese detective fiction (推理小説, suiri shōsetsu; literally deductive reasoning fiction), is a popular genre of Japanese literature.

== History ==
=== Name ===
When Western detective fiction spread to Japan, it created a new genre called detective fiction (tantei shōsetsu (探偵小説)) in Japanese literature. After World War II the genre was renamed deductive reasoning fiction (suiri shōsetsu (推理小説)). The genre is sometimes called mystery, although this includes non-detective fiction as well.

=== Development ===
Edogawa Rampo is the first Japanese modern mystery writer and the founder of the Detective Story Club in Japan. Rampo was an admirer of western mystery writers. He gained his fame in early 1920s, when he began to bring to the genre many bizarre, erotic and even fantastic elements. This is partly because of the social tension before World War II. Rampo's mystery novels generally followed conventional formulas, and have been classed as part of the honkaku ha (本格派), translated as "classical whodunit", or "orthodox school", or "standard" detective fiction, or "authentic" detective fiction. (Note: Kenkyusha's dictionary also has a side-by-side entry on honkaku-teki which it parses into three senses: "genuine, real", "orthodox", or "standard".)

In 1957, Seicho Matsumoto received the Mystery Writers of Japan Award for his short story The Face (顔, kao). The Face and Matsumoto's subsequent works began the "social school" (社会派, shakai ha) within the genre, which emphasized social realism, described crimes in an ordinary setting and sets motives within a wider context of social injustice and political corruption.

Since the 1980s, a "neo-classical whodunit", or "neo-orthodox school" (新本格派, shin honkaku ha) has surfaced. It demands restoration of the classic rules of detective fiction and the use of more self-reflective elements, largely inspired by the works of Ellery Queen and John Dickson Carr. Famous authors of this movement include Soji Shimada, Yukito Ayatsuji, Rintaro Norizuki, Alice Arisugawa, Kaoru Kitamura and Taku Ashibe.

=== Quotation ===
I think that the writer of the detective novels can describe human being by emphatically drawing the crime motive. Because the crime motive originates from the psychology when people is left in the extreme situation. After World War II, I do not think that the writers of the detective novels have succeeded in drawing human being enough. Rather I think that from the beginning they abandon the will that draw human being. In this way, the detective novels became the game for narrow-minded enthusiasts. From old days, I had dissatisfaction toward the detective story of the kind that common people could not be interested in. Accurately, I had this dissatisfaction for the writers who continue to write such a detective novel. I will not assert that a detective novel has to be literary. However, nonetheless, I hope the detective novels to be written that we can appreciate more than the minimum standard as a novel.

— Seichō Matsumoto. Zuihitsu Kuroi Techō (Essays on the Mystery Novel). 1961. pp.18 - 25.

Ellery, the slim handsome young man says: "To me, detective fiction is a kind of intellectual game. A logical game that gives readers sensations about detectives or authors. These are not to be ranked high or low. So I don't want the once popular 'social school' realism. Female employee murdered in a deluxe suite room; criminal police's tireless investigation eventually brings in the murdering boss-cum-boyfriend--All cliché. Political scandals of corruption and ineptness; tragedies of distortion of modern society; these are also out of date. The most appropriate materials for detective fiction, whether accused untimely or not, are famous detectives, grand mansions, suspicious residents, bloody murders, puzzling situation, earth-shattering scheme . . . . Made up things are even better. The point is to enjoy the pleasure in the world of reasoning. But intellectual prerequisites must be completely met."

— Yukito Ayatsuji. The Decagon House Murders. 1987. pp.1.

== Japanese mystery awards ==
- Awards for best works published in the previous year
  - Mystery Writers of Japan Award (since 1948) - awarded by Mystery Writers of Japan (founded in 1947)
  - Honkaku Mystery Award (since 2001) - awarded by Honkaku Mystery Writers Club of Japan (founded in 2000)
- Awards for lifetime achievement
  - Japan Mystery Literature Award for Lifetime Achievement (ja) (since 1998)
- Awards for unpublished mystery novels
  - Edogawa Rampo Prize (since 1955) - awarded by Mystery Writers of Japan
  - Yokomizo Seishi Mystery Award (ja) (since 1981)
  - Ayukawa Tetsuya Award (ja) (since 1990)
  - Mephisto Prize (since 1996)
  - Japan Mystery Literature Award for New Writers (ja) (since 1998)
  - Kono Mystery ga Sugoi! Award (ja) (since 2002)
  - Fukuyama Mystery Literature Award for New Writers (ja) (since 2009)
  - Agatha Christie Award (since 2011)
  - Shincho Mystery Award (since 2014)

== Top book lists of mystery fiction published in Japan ==
- Tozai Mystery Best 100
- Kono Mystery ga Sugoi!
- Honkaku Mystery Best 10

== Japanese mystery writers ==
Pioneers of Japanese mystery writing

- Ruiko Kuroiwa (ja) (1862–1920, M)
- Kido Okamoto (1872–1939, M)
- Teruko Okura (ja) (1886–1960, F)
- Kyusaku Yumeno (1889–1936, M)
- Fuboku Kosakai (ja) (1890–1929, M)
- Saburo Koga (ja) (1893–1945, M)
- Edogawa Rampo (né Hirai Taro) (1894–1965, M)
- Shiro Hamao (ja) (1896–1935, M)
- Udaru Oshita (ja) (1896–1966, M)
- Takataro Kigi (ja) (1897–1969, M)
- Juza Unno (1897–1949, M)
- Kaitarō Hasegawa (1900–1935, M)
- Keisuke Watanabe (ja) (1901–2002, M)
- Mushitaro Oguri (1901–1946, M)
- Juran Hisao (1902–1957, M)
- Seishi Yokomizo (1902–1981, M)
- On Watanabe (1902–1930, M)
- Kikuo Tsunoda (ja) (1906–1994, M)
- Yu Aoi (ja) (1909–1975, M)
- Keikichi Osaka (ja) (1912–1945, M)

Writers who debuted in the late 1940s

- Ango Sakaguchi (1906–1955, M)
- Tetsuya Ayukawa (1919–2002, M)
- Akimitsu Takagi (1920–1995, M)
- Futaro Yamada (1922–2001, M)

Writers who debuted in the 1950s

- Seichō Matsumoto (1909–1992, M)
- Eisuke Nakazono (1920–2002, M)
- Toshiyuki Kajiyama (1930–1975, M)
- Tensei Kono (1935–2012, M)

Writers who debuted in the 1960s

- Tsutomu Minakami (1919–2004, M)
- Shunshin Chin (born 1924–2015, M)
- Kyotaro Nishimura (born 1930–2022, M)
- Masaki Tsuji (born 1932, M)
- Seiichi Morimura (born 1933–2023, M)
- Sakae Saitō (born 1933, M)
- Masako Togawa (1933-2016, F)
- Yasutaka Tsutsui (born 1934, M)
- Misa Yamamura (1934-1996, F)

Writers who debuted in the 1970s

- Tsumao Awasaka (ja) (1933–2009, M)
- Kenzo Kitakata (born 1947, M)
- Jirō Akagawa (born 1948, M)
- Masaki Yamada (born 1950, M)
- Joh Sasaki (born 1950, M)
- Toshihiko Yahagi (ja) (born 1950, M)
- Atsunori Tomatsu (ja) (born 1952, M)
- Kaoru Kurimoto (1953–2009, F)
- Arimasa Osawa (born 1956, M)

Writers who debuted in the 1980s

- Koshi Kurumizawa (1925–1994, M)
- Go Osaka (born 1943, M)
- Katsuhiko Takahashi (born 1947, M)
- Soji Shimada (born 1948, M)
- Kaoru Kitamura (born 1949, M)
- Yoshinaga Fujita (born 1950, M)
- Motohiko Izawa (born 1954, M)
- Hikaru Okuizumi (born 1956, M)
- Keigo Higashino (1958-2026, M)
- Alice Arisugawa (born 1959, M)
- Asa Nonami (born 1960, F)
- Miyuki Miyabe (born 1960, F)
- Yukito Ayatsuji (born 1960, M)
- Fuyumi Ono (born 1960, F)
- Shogo Utano (ja) (born 1961, M)
- Rintaro Norizuki (born 1964, M)

Writers who debuted in the 1990s

- Tetsuo Takashima (born 1949, M)
- Natsuo Kirino (born 1951, F)
- Kaoru Takamura (ja) (born 1953, F)
- Bin Konno (ja) (born 1955, M)
- Setsuko Shinoda (ja) (born 1955, F)
- Naomi Azuma (ja) (born 1956, M)
- Hiroshi Mori (born 1957, M)
- Hideo Yokoyama (born 1957, M)
- Taku Ashibe (born 1958, M)
- Yusuke Kishi (born 1959, M)
- Hideo Okuda (ja) (born 1959, M)
- Ira Ishida (born 1960, M)
- Arata Tendo (ja) (born 1960, M)
- Hisashi Nozawa (1960–2004, M)
- Yuichi Shimpo (ja) (born 1961, M)
- Natsuhiko Kyogoku (born 1963, M)
- Kurumi Inui (born 1963, M)
- Seishu Hase (born 1965, M)
- Tokuro Nukui (ja) (born 1968, M)
- Shuichi Yoshida (born 1968, M)
- Fumie Kondo (ja) (born 1969, F)
- Yutaka Maya (ja) (born 1969, M)
- Gakuto Mikumo (born 1970, M)
- Kazuki Sakuraba (born 1971, F)
- Ryūsui Seiryōin (born 1973, M)
- Otsuichi (born 1978, M)

Writers who debuted in the 2000s

- Mahokaru Numata (ja) (born 1948, F)
- Kazuhiro Kiuchi (born 1960, M)
- Shunichi Doba (ja) (born 1963, M)
- Kazuaki Takano (ja) (born 1964, M)
- Ryosuke Kakine (ja) (born 1966, M)
- Koji Yanagi (ja) (born 1967, M)
- Tokuya Higashigawa (ja) (born 1968, M)
- Tetsuya Honda (ja) (born 1969, M)
- Kōtarō Isaka (born 1971, M)
- Ōtarō Maijō (born 1973)
- Kanae Minato (ja) (born 1973, F)
- Shusuke Michio (ja) (born 1975, M)
- Fuminori Nakamura (born 1977, M)
- Honobu Yonezawa (ja) (born 1978, M)
- Mizuki Tsujimura (ja) (born 1980, F)
- Yuya Sato (born 1980, M)
- Nisio Isin (born 1981)

Writers who debuted in the 2010s

- En Mikami (ja) (born 1971, M)
- Aki Hamanaka (born 1976, M)

== Aozora Bunko ==
Listed below are Japanese mystery writers whose works are available in Aozora Bunko, a Japanese digital library.

Ruiko Kuroiwa's short story Muzan (1889), which is also available in Aozora Bunko, is one of the earliest Japanese detective stories.

H

- Shiro Hamao (ja) (1896–1935, M)
- Kaitarō Hasegawa (1900–1935, M)
- Mondo Hashi (1884–1957, M)
- Goro Hashimoto (ja) (1903–1948, M)
- Hatsunosuke Hirabayashi (ja) (1892–1931, M)
- Juran Hisao (1902–1957, M)

K

- Isao Kawada (1882–1931, M)
- Saburo Koga (ja) (1893–1945, M)
- Fuboku Kosakai (ja) (1890–1929, M)
- Ruiko Kuroiwa (ja) (1862–1920, M)

M

- Tai Matsumoto (ja) (1890–1929, M)
- Kaita Murayama (1896–1919, M)

N

- Tadashi Nishio (ja) (1907–1949, M)

O

- Taketoshi Oba (1904–1945, M)
- Mushitaro Oguri (1901–1946, M)
- Kido Okamoto (1872–1939, M)
- Teruko Okura (ja) (1886–1960, F)
- Keikichi Osaka (ja) (1912–1945, M)

R

- Ikujiro Ran (ja) (1913–1944, M)

S

- Ango Sakaguchi (1906–1955, M)
- Kashichi Sakai (1903–1946, M)
- Toshiro Sasaki (1900–1933, M)
- Akio Senoo (ja) (1892–1962, M)

T

- Sotoo Tachibana (ja) (1894–1959, M)

U

- Juza Unno (1897–1949, M)

W

- On Watanabe (1902–1930, M)

Y

- Nogitaro Yamamoto (1889–1951, M)
- Risaburo Yamashita (1892–1952, M)
- Kyusaku Yumeno (1889–1936, M)

== Japanese detective manga series ==
- Case Closed a.k.a. Detective Conan (written and illustrated by Gosho Aoyama)
- Kindaichi Case Files (written by Yōzaburō Kanari or Seimaru Amagi and illustrated by Fumiya Satō)
- Q.E.D. (written and illustrated by Motohiro Katō)
- Detective School Q (written by Seimaru Amagi and illustrated by Fumiya Satō)

== Video game adaptions ==
There are visual novels and adventure games that take inspiration from this fiction genre.

- The Portopia Serial Murder Case, a 1983 video game by Enix.
- Nintendo has published many video game adaptations of the Japanese detective fiction formula, starting with the Famicom Detective Club franchise. They also published a Detective Pikachu video game, which itself adapted into a 2019 film.
- The Ace Attorney series of games by Capcom are based on this genre and take place in a courtroom.

== See also ==
- Golden Age of Detective Fiction
- Detective fiction
- Mystery fiction
- Crime fiction
- Japanese literature
- Japanese horror
- Japanese science fiction
- Japan Three Great Mysteries (ja)
- Category:Japanese mystery writers
- Category:Japanese crime fiction writers
