= List of detective fiction authors =

This is a list of detective fiction writers. Many of these authors may also overlap with authors of crime fiction, mystery fiction, or thriller fiction.

== A–C ==
- Mario Acevedo (1955–)
- Douglas Adams (1952–2001)
- Humayun Ahmed (1948–2012)
- Margery Allingham (1904–1966)
- Rudolfo Anaya (1937–2020)
- Yūgo Aosaki (1991–)
- Gosho Aoyama (1963–)
- Frank Arnau (1894–1976), pseudonym of Heinrich Schmitt
- Taku Ashibe (1958–)
- Ace Atkins (1970–)
- Kate Atkinson (1951–)
- Takashi Atōda (1935–)
- Tatsumi Atsukawa (1994–)
- Yukito Ayatsuji (1960–)
- Sharadindu Bandyopadhyay
- Nevada Barr (1952–)
- Earle Basinsky
- M. C. Beaton (1936–2019)
- Larry Beinhart
- E. C. Bentley (1875–1956)
- Earl Derr Biggers (1884–1933)
- Cara Black (1951–)
- Emery Bonett (1906–1995)
- John Bonett (1906–1989)
- Rhys Bowen (1941–)
- Leigh Brackett (1915–1978)
- P. J. Brackston
- Lilian Jackson Braun
- Collin Brooks (1893–1959)
- John Burdett (1951–)
- James Lee Burke (1936–)
- Michel Bussi (1965–)
- Meg Cabot (1967–)
- John Dickson Carr (1905–1977)
- Jessie Chandler (1968–)
- Raymond Chandler (1888–1959)
- Leslie Charteris (1907–1993)
- G. K. Chesterton (1874–1936)
- Shunshin Chin (1924–2015)
- Agatha Christie (1890–1976)
- Carol Higgins Clark (1956–2023)
- Brian Cleeve (1921–2003)
- Ann Cleeves (1954–)
- Barbara Cleverly
- Michael Collins (1924–2005), pseudonym of Dennis Lynds
- Michael Connelly (1956–)
- Patricia Cornwell (1956–)
- Robert Crais (1953–)
- Bill Crider (1941–2018)
- Edmund Crispin (1921–1978)
- Amanda Cross (1926–2003), pseudonym of Carolyn Gold Heilbrun
- Chris Culver
- Clive Cussler (1931–2020)

== D–H ==
- Jordan Dane (1953–)
- Lindsey Davis (1949–)
- Jeffery Deaver (1950–)
- Ted Dekker (1962–)
- Colin Dexter (1930–2017)
- Graham Diamond
- David Dodge (1910–1974)
- Sir Arthur Conan Doyle (1859–1930)
- Sarah Dunant (1960–)
- John Dunning (1942–2023)
- Francis Durbridge
- C. M. Eddy, Jr.
- Rampo Edogawa (1894–1965)
- Martin Edwards (1955–)
- Loren D. Estleman
- Jasper Fforde (1961–)
- Charles Finch (1980–)
- Dick Francis (1920–2010)
- R. Austin Freeman (1862–1943)
- Kinky Friedman (1944–2024)
- Gayleen Froese (1972–)
- David Fulmer (1950–)
- Jacques Futrelle
- Frances Fyfield, pseudonym of Frances Hegarty
- Émile Gaboriau (1832 – 1873)
- Erle Stanley Gardner (1889–1970)
- Elizabeth George (1949–)
- Alan Gordon (1959–)
- Alison Gordon
- Steven Gore
- Chester Gould (1900–1985)
- Sue Grafton (1940–2017)
- Heather Graham (1970–)
- Maxwell Grant (1924–2005)
- W. E. B. Griffin (1929–2019)
- Martha Grimes (1931–)
- Tarquin Hall (1969–)
- Dashiell Hammett (1894–1961)
- Joseph Hansen (1923–2004)
- John Harvey
- Carl Hiaasen (1953–)
- Keigo Higashino (1958–2026)
- E. W. Hildick (1925–2001)
- Tony Hillerman (1925–2008)
- Kay Hooper (1957–)
- Barry Hughart

== I–M ==
- Ibn-e-Safi (1928–1980)
- Michael Innes (1906–1994)
- Kōtarō Isaka (1971–)
- P. D. James (1920–2014)
- Peter James (1948–)
- J. A. Jance
- Darynda Jones
- Faye Kellerman (1952–)
- Jonathan Kellerman (1949–)
- Philip Kerr (1956–2018)
- Laurie R. King (1952–)
- Natsuo Kirino (1951–)
- Kenzo Kitakata (1947–)
- Kazuhiro Kiuchi (1960–)
- Andrew Klavan
- William Kent Krueger (1950–)
- Natsuhiko Kyogoku (1963–)
- Camilla Lackberg (1974–)
- Lori L. Lake (1960–)
- Maria Lang (1914–1991)
- Stieg Larsson (1954–2004)
- David Lassman (1963–)
- Dennis Lehane (1965–)
- Paul Levine (1948–)
- Paul Levinson (1947–)
- Jeff Lindsay
- Laura Lippman (1959–)
- Peter Lovesey (1936–2025)
- Lisa Lutz (1970–)
- Dennis Lynds (1924–2005)
- Ed Lynskey (1956–)
- John D. MacDonald (1916–1986)
- Ross Macdonald (1915–1983), pseudonym of Kenneth Millar
- Charlotte MacLeod (1922–2004), also writes under Alisa Craig
- Henning Mankell (1948–2015)
- Dan J. Marlowe (1914–1987)
- Ngaio Marsh (1895–1982)
- Seichō Matsumoto (1909–1992)
- Ed McBain (1926–2005)
- Alexander McCall Smith (1948–)
- James McClure (1939–2006)
- Val McDermid (1955–)
- Jimmy McGovern
- Margaret Millar (1915–1994)
- Gladys Mitchell (1901–1983)
- Premendra Mitra (1904–1988)
- Miyuki Miyabe (1960–)
- Christopher G. Moore (1946–)
- Walter Mosley (1952–)
- Margaret Murphy

== N–S ==
- Reggie Nadelson
- Jo Nesbø (1960–)
- Friedrich Neznansky
- Kyotaro Nishimura (1930–2022)
- Asa Nonami (1960–)
- Rintaro Norizuki (1964–)
- Joyce Carol Oates
- Kido Okamoto (1872–1939)
- Go Osaka (1943–)
- Arimasa Osawa (1956–)
- Robert B. Parker (1932–2010)
- James Patterson (1947–)
- Eliot Pattison
- Louise Penny (1958–)
- Anne Perry (1938–2023)
- Ellis Peters (1913–1995), pseudonym of Edith Pargeter
- Edgar Allan Poe (1809–1849)
- Ellery Queen, pseudonym of Frederick Dannay and Manfred B. Lee
- Qiu Xiaolong (1953–)
- Ian Rankin (1960–)
- Satyajit Ray (1921–1992)
- Kathy Reichs
- Ruth Rendell (1930–2015)
- Rick Riordan (1964–)
- J. D. Robb, pseudonym of Nora Roberts
- Les Roberts
- Peter Robinson
- Hemendra Kumar Roy (1888–1963)
- S. J. Rozan (1950–)
- Lawrence Sanders (1920–1998)
- John Sandford (1944–)
- Dorothy L. Sayers (1893–1957)
- Steven Saylor (1956–)
- Dell Shannon (1921–1988), pseudonym of Elizabeth Linington
- Soji Shimada (1948–)
- Georges Simenon (1903–1989)
- Sjöwall and Wahlöö (1935–2020, 1926–1975)
- Martin Cruz Smith (1942–2025)
- Mickey Spillane (1918–2006)
- Agnieszka Stelmaszyk (born 1978)
- Manning Lee Stokes (1911–1976)
- Rex Stout (1886–1975)
- Leonie Swann

== T–Y ==
- Akimitsu Takagi (1920–1995)
- Katsuhiko Takahashi (1947–)
- Josephine Tey (1896–1952)
- Arthur_Upfield (1890–1964)
- Andrew Vachss (1942–2021)
- Janwillem van de Wetering (1931–2008)
- Robert van Gulik (1910–1967)
- Jack Vance (1916–2013)
- Barbara Vine, pseudonym of Ruth Rendell
- H. Russell Wakefield (1888–1964)
- Martin Walker (1947–)
- Joseph Wambaugh (1937–2025)
- Charlie Wells
- Patricia Wentworth (1878–1961)
- Donald Westlake (pseudonyms include Richard Stark)
- Jacqueline Winspear
- Stuart Woods (1938–2022)
- Seishi Yokomizo (1902–1981)
- Hideo Yokoyama (1957–)
- Honobu Yonezawa (1978–)

== See also ==
- Detective fiction
- List of crime writers
- List of mystery writers
- List of authors
- List of female detective/mystery writers

== External resources ==
- Classic Crime Fiction, resource site for collectors of detective fiction
