= Honkaku Mystery Best 10 =

Annual mystery fiction guide book

- Editor: Tantei Shosetsu Kenkyu Kai
- Categories: mystery fiction
- Frequency: Annually
- Publisher: Hara Shobo
- First issue: March 20, 1998
- Country: Japan
- Language: Japanese

Honkaku Mystery Best 10 (本格ミステリ・ベスト10, Honkaku Misuteri Besuto 10) is an annual mystery fiction guide book published by Hara Shobo. The guide book publishes a list of the top ten honkaku (i.e. authentic, orthodox) mystery books published in Japan in the previous year.

== 2001 ==
2001 Honkaku Mystery Best 10 (Hara Shobo. December, 2000)

International
Rank	Author	Title
1	H. Bustos Domecq	Six Problems for Don Isidro Parodi
2	Edward D. Hoch	(Dr. Sam Hawthorne series)
3	Cyril Hare	Suicide Excepted
4	Thomas H. Cook	Instruments of Night
5	Leo Bruce	Case Without a Corpse
6	Edmund Crispin	Swan Song
7	Elizabeth Ferrars	The Wandering Widows
8	Charles Daly King	The Curious Mr. Tarrant
8	Stanley Hyland	Who goes hang?
10	Reginald Hill	On Beulah Height
10	Ellis Peters	A Nice Derangement of Epitaphs
10	Hillary Waugh	End of a Party

Japanese
Rank	Author	Title
1	Tsumao Awasaka (ja)	Kijutsu Tantei SOGA Kajo Zenshu (奇術探偵曾我佳城全集)
2	Kaju Koizumi (ja)	Higa (火蛾)
3	Jun Kurachi (ja)	Kochu no Tengoku (壺中の天国)
4	Yutaka Maya (ja)	Mokusei no Oji (木製の王子)
5	Masayuki Shuno (ja)	Mino Gyu (美濃牛)
6	Seiji Kodokoro (ja)	Shonen-tachi no Misshitsu (少年たちの密室)
7	Yasuhiko Nishizawa (ja)	Ison (依存)
8	Alice Arisugawa (ja)	Yurei Deka (幽霊刑事)
9	Ichi Orihara (ja)	Tosaku no Kiketsu (倒錯の帰結)
10	Taku Ashibe	Kaijin Tai Meitantei (怪人対名探偵)

== 2002 ==
2002 Honkaku Mystery Best 10 (Hara Shobo. December, 2001)

International
Rank	Author	Title
1	Anthony Berkeley Cox	Jumping Jenny [US title: Dead Mrs. Stratton]
2	Jill McGown	The Stalking Horse
3	Anthony Berkeley Cox	Top Storey Murder
3	Dorothy L. Sayers	Gaudy Night
5		(Anthology of Locked room mystery)
6	G. K. Chesterton	Four Faultless Felons
7	Carter Dickson	The Third Bullet
8	Nicholas Blake	Thou Shell of Death
9	Sarah Caldwell	The Sibyl in Her Grave
10	Richard Hull	Keep It Quiet
10	Hake Talbot	Rim of the Pit

Japanese
Rank	Author	Title
1	Masaki Yamada	Misuteri Opera (ミステリ・オペラ)
2	Taku Ashibe	Toki no Misshitsu (時の密室)
3	Fuyumi Ono	Kokushi no Shima (黒祠の島)
4	Seiji Kodokoro	Mikansei (未完成)
5	Kenji Kuroda (ja)	Garasu-zaiku no Matoryoshika (硝子細工のマトリョーシカ)
6	Takahiro Okura (ja)	Sannin-me no Yurei (三人目の幽霊)
7	Soji Shimada	Roshia Yurei Gunkan Jiken (ロシア幽霊軍艦事件)
8	Alice Arisugawa	Zekkyo-jo Satsujin Jiken (絶叫城殺人事件)
9	Miyuki Miyabe	Mohohan (模倣犯); English translation: Puppet Master
9	Akira Aikawa (ja)	Miko no Yakata no Misshitsu (巫女の館の密室)

== 2003 ==
2003 Honkaku Mystery Best 10 (Hara Shobo. December, 2002)

International
Rank	Author	Title
1	Paul Halter	The Fourth Door
2	Anthony Berkeley Cox	The Layton Court Mystery
3	Helen McCloy	Cue for Murder
4	Jill McGown	Death of a Dancer (aka Gone to Her Death)
5	Edward D. Hoch	(Dr. Sam Hawthorne series)
6	Anthony Berkeley Cox	The Wychford Poisoning Case
7	Robert J. Sawyer	Illegal Alien
8	Fred Vargas	The Three Evangelists
9	Michael Slade	Ripper
10	Minette Walters	The Echo

Japanese
Rank	Author	Title
1	Kiyoshi Kasai (ja)	Oidipusu Shokogun (オイディプス症候群)
2	Rintaro Norizuki	An Urban Legend Puzzle (EQMM January 2004) and other stories
3	Alice Arisugawa	Mare Tetsudo no Nazo (マレー鉄道の謎)
4	Masayuki Shuno	Kagami no Naka wa Nichiyobi (鏡の中は日曜日)
5	Otsuichi	Gosu Risutokatto Jiken (GOTH リストカット事件); English translation: Goth: A Novel of Horror
6	Masaki Yamada	Sojo no Tsumiki Uta (僧正の積木唄)
7	Taku Ashibe	Guran Ginyoru Jo (グラン・ギニョール城)
8	Masaya Yamaguchi (ja)	Kigu (奇偶)
9	Yasuhiko Nishizawa	Renshusatsu (聯愁殺)
10	Soji Shimada	Majin no Yugi (魔神の遊戯)

== 2004 ==
2004 Honkaku Mystery Best 10 (Hara Shobo. December, 2003)

International
Rank	Author	Title
1	Paul Halter	La Mort Vous Invite (Death Invites You)
2	Michael Gilbert	Death in Captivity
3	Anthony Berkeley Cox	Roger Sheringham and the Vane Mystery [US title: The Mystery at Lovers' Cave]
4	Helen McCloy	The Singing Diamonds and Other Stories
5	Max Afford	Death's Mannikins
6	Percival Wilde	P. Moran, Operative
7	Harrington Hext	The Thing at Their Heels
8	Michael Slade	Zombie (aka. Evil Eye)
9	Thomas H. Cook	Interrogation
10	Sarah Waters	Affinity

Japanese
Rank	Author	Title
1	Shogo Utano (ja)	Hazakura no Kisetsu ni Kimi o Omou toiu Koto (葉桜の季節に君を想うということ)
2	Alice Arisugawa	Suisu-dokei no Nazo (スイス時計の謎)
3	Asami Ishimochi (ja)	Tsuki no Tobira (月の扉)
4	Takahiro Okura	Shichido-gitsune (七度狐)
5	Natsuhiko Kyogoku	Ommoraki no Kizu (陰摩羅鬼の瑕)
6	Yasuhiko Nishizawa	Kami no Rojikku Hito no Majikku (神のロジック人のマジック)
7	Fuyumi Ono	Kura no Kami (くらのかみ)
8	Kenji Kodama (ja)	Akai Gessho (赫い月照)
8	Hajime Tsukato (ja)	Ozu no Meikyu (OZの迷宮)
10	Soji Shimada	Neji-shiki Zazetsuki (ネジ式ザゼツキー)

== 2005 ==
2005 Honkaku Mystery Best 10 (Hara Shobo. December, 2004)

International
Rank	Author	Title
1	Paul Halter	The Crimson Fog
2	Edward D. Hoch	(Dr. Sam Hawthorne series)
3	Minette Walters	The Shape of Snakes
4	Anthony Berkeley Cox	The Silk Stocking Murders
5	Edmund Crispin	Holy Disorders
6	Ronald Knox	The Footsteps at the Lock
7	José Carlos Somoza	The Athenian Murders
8	John Franklin Bardin	The Last of Philip Banter
8	Sarah Waters	Fingersmith
10	Charles Daly King	Obelists at Sea
10	A. H. Z. Carr	The Trial of John Nobody and other stories

Japanese
Rank	Author	Title
1	Rintaro Norizuki	Namakubi ni Kiitemiro (生首に聞いてみろ)
2	Yukito Ayatsuji	Ankoku-kan no Satsujin (暗黒館の殺人)
3	Yutaka Maya	Hotaru (螢)
4	Taku Ashibe	Koromu no Satsujin (紅楼夢の殺人); English translation: Murder in the Red Chamber
5	Yusuke Kishi	Garasu no Hamma (硝子のハンマー)
6	Kurumi Inui	Inishieshon Rabu (イニシエーション・ラブ)
7	Asami Ishimochi	Mizu no Meikyu (水の迷宮)
8	Seiichiro Oyama (ja)	Arufabetto Pazurazu (アルファベット・パズラーズ)
9	Hajime Amagi (ja)	AMAGI Hajime no Misshitsu Hanzai-gaku Kyotei (天城一の密室犯罪学教程)
10	Masayuki Shuno	Kimaira no Atarashii Shiro (キマイラの新しい城)

== 2006 ==
2006 Honkaku Mystery Best 10 (Hara Shobo. December, 2005)

International
Rank	Author	Title
1	Leo Bruce	A Bone and a Hank of Hair
2	Patrick Quentin	Puzzle for Wantons
3	Paul Halter	La mort derrière les rideaux (Death Behind the Curtains)
4	Michael Innes	Stop Press (aka. The Spider Strikes)
5	Hillary Waugh	A Rag and a Bone
6	Michael Slade	Shrink (aka. Primal Scream)
7	Jack Ritchie	The Crime Machine and other stories
8	Aaron Elkins	Good Blood
9	Leo Perutz	Master of the Day of Judgment
10	Robert van Gulik	The Willow Pattern

Japanese
Rank	Author	Title
1	Keigo Higashino	Yogisha X no Kenshin (容疑者Xの献身); English translation: The Devotion of Suspect X
2	Asami Ishimochi	Tobira wa Tozasareta mama (扉は閉ざされたまま)
3	Takemaru Abiko (ja)	Miroku no Te (弥勒の掌)
4	Kaoru Kitamura	The Japanese Nickel Mystery (ニッポン硬貨の謎, Nippon Koka no Nazo)
5	Yutaka Maya	Kamisama Gemu (神様ゲーム)
6	Soji Shimada	Matenro no Kaijin (摩天楼の怪人)
6	Tokuya Higashigawa (ja)	Kokan Satsujin ni wa Mukanai Yoru (交換殺人には向かない夜)
8	Taku Ashibe	Sambyakunen no Nazo Hako (三百年の謎匣)
9	Hajime Tsukato	Goremu no Ori (ゴーレムの檻)
10	Shunsuke Sasaki (ja)	Mozo Satsujin Jiken (模像殺人事件)

== 2007 ==
2007 Honkaku Mystery Best 10 (Hara Shobo. December, 2006)

International
Rank	Author	Title
1	Norman Berrow	The Footprints of Satan
2	Ellery Queen	The Tragedy of Errors
3	Paul Halter	La Malédiction de Barberousse (The Curse of Barbarossa)
4	Guillermo Martínez	The Oxford Murders
5	John Dickson Carr	Papa La-Bas
6	Elizabeth Ferrars	Your Neck in a Noose [US title: Neck in a Noose]
7	Richard Matheson	Now You See It...
8	R. Austin Freeman	As A Thief in the Night
9	Roger Scarlett	In the First Degree
10	Paul C. Doherty	The Nightingale Gallery

Japanese
Rank	Author	Title
1	Alice Arisugawa	Ran'a no Shima (乱鴉の島)
2	Asami Ishimochi	Kao no Nai Teki (顔のない敵)
3	Shinzo Mitsuda (ja)	Majimono no gotoki Tsuku Mono (厭魅の如き憑くもの)
4	Honobu Yonezawa	Kaki Gentei Toropikaru Pafe Jiken (夏期限定トロピカルパフェ事件)
5	Natsuhiko Kyogoku	Jami no Shizuku (邪魅の雫)
6	Shusuke Michio (ja)	Shadou (シャドウ)
7	Shusuke Michio	Mukuro no Tsume (骸の爪)
8	Takahiro Okura	Fukuie Keibuho no Aisatsu (福家警部補の挨拶)
9	Shusuke Michio	Himawari no Sakanai Natsu (向日葵の咲かない夏)
10	Seiichiro Oyama	Kamen Genso Kyoku (仮面幻双曲)

== 2008 ==
2008 Honkaku Mystery Best 10 (Hara Shobo. December, 2007)

International
Rank	Author	Title
1	Paul Halter	La Chambre du Fou (The Madman's Room)
2	D. M. Devine	Devil at Your Elbow
3	Theodore Roscoe	Murder on the Way!
4	James Anderson	The Affair of the Mutilated Mink
5	William Brittain	The Man Who Read John Dickson Carr and other stories
6	Ann Cleeves	Raven Black
7	Clayton Rawson	Death Out of Thin Air
8	Boris Akunin	Murder on the Leviathan
9	Edward D. Hoch	(Dr. Sam Hawthorne series)
9	Henry Wade	The Dying Alderman

Japanese
Rank	Author	Title
1	Alice Arisugawa	Joo-koku no Shiro (女王国の城)
2	Shinzo Mitsuda	Kubinashi no gotoki Tataru Mono (首無の如き祟るもの)
3	Hajime Tsukato	Misshitsu Kingudamu (密室キングダム)
4	Honobu Yonezawa	Inshitemiru (インシテミル)
5	Haruo Yamazawa (ja)	Hanareta Ie (離れた家)
6	Shogo Utano	Misshitsu Satsujin Gemu Ote Hisha Tori (密室殺人ゲーム王手飛車取り)
7	Yasuhiko Nishizawa	Shukakusai (収穫祭)
8	Ryuichi Kasumi (ja)	Yuhi wa Kaeru (夕陽はかえる)
9	Soji Shimada	Riberutasu no Guwa (リベルタスの寓話)
10	Asami Ishimochi	Shinzo to Hidari-te (心臓と左手)

== 2009 ==
2009 Honkaku Mystery Best 10 (Hara Shobo. December, 2008)

International
Rank	Author	Title
1	D. M. Devine	This Is Your Death
2	Michael Innes	There Came Both Mist and Snow
3	Paul Halter	The Seventh Hypothesis
4	Ellery Queen	The Adventure of the Murdered Moths and Other Radio Mysteries 1
5	Gilbert Adair	The Act of Roger Murgatroyd
6	Glyn Daniel	The Cambridge Murders
7	R. Austin Freeman	Mr. Pottermack's Oversight
8	James Powell	A Dirge for Clowntown and other stories
9	Percival Wilde	Inquest
10	Hake Talbot	The Hangman's Handyman

Japanese
Rank	Author	Title
1	Shinzo Mitsuda	Yamamma no gotoki Warau Mono (山魔の如き嗤うもの)
2	Shusuke Michio	Ratto Man (ラットマン)
3	Masaki Tsuji	Kanzen Ren'ai (完全恋愛)
4	Keigo Higashino	Seijo no Kyusai (聖女の救済); English translation: Salvation of a Saint
5	Kiyoshi Kasai	Seido no Higeki Hinshi no O (青銅の悲劇 瀕死の王)
6	Taku Ashibe	Saiban'in Hotei (裁判員法廷)
7	Alice Arisugawa	Kisaki wa Fune o Shizumeru (妃は船を沈める)
8	Hajime Tsukato	Pegasasu to Ikkakuju Yakkyoku (ペガサスと一角獣薬局)
9	Reiichiro Fukami (ja)	Ekoru do Pari Satsujin Jiken (エコール・ド・パリ殺人事件)
10	Yusuke Kishi	Kitsune-bi no Ie (狐火の家)
10	Hiu Torikai (ja)	Kanno-teki Yottsu no Kyoki (官能的 四つの狂気)

== 2010 ==
2010 Honkaku Mystery Best 10 (Hara Shobo. December, 2009)

International
Rank	Author	Title
1	D. M. Devine	Dead Trouble
2	Percival Wilde	Tinsley's Bones
3	Paul Halter	The Tiger's Head
4	Jim Kelly	The Water Clock
5	Edward D. Hoch	(Simon Ark series)
6	Ellery Queen	The Adventure of the Murdered Moths and Other Radio Mysteries 2
7	Marcel F. Lanteaume	Trompe-l'oeil
8	Anthony Lejeune	Mr. Diabolo
9	Helen McCloy	Two-Thirds of a Ghost
10	T. S. Stribling	Best Dr. Poggioli Detective Stories

Japanese
Rank	Author	Title
1	Shogo Utano	Misshitsu Satsujin Gemu 2.0 (密室殺人ゲーム2.0)
2	Yasuhiko Nishizawa	Migawari (身代わり)
3	Yukito Ayatsuji	Anazā (アナザー); English translation: Another
4	Honobu Yonezawa	Tsuiso Godan Sho (追想五断章)
5	Keigo Higashino	Shinzam-mono (新参者)
6	Kaoru Kitamura	Sagi to Yuki (鷺と雪)
7	Koji Yanagi	Daburu Joka (ダブル・ジョーカー)
8	Tokuya Higashigawa	Koko ni Shitai o Sutenaide Kudasai (ここに死体を捨てないでください!)
9	Koji Kitakuni (ja)	Ribasu (リバース)
9	Tokuro Nukui (ja)	Kokai to Shinjitsu no Iro (後悔と真実の色)

== 2011 ==
2011 Honkaku Mystery Best 10 (Hara Shobo. December, 2010)

International
Rank	Author	Title
1	Peter Antony	How Doth the Little Crocodile?
2	Louis Bayard	The Pale Blue Eye
3	William Brittain	Mr.Strang Gives a Lecture and other stories
4	Rupert Penny	Policeman's Evidence
5	Anthony Berkeley	Panic Party
6	Paul Halter	La Lettre Qui Tue (The Deadly Letter)
6	Patrick Quentin	Puzzle for Fiends
8	Carol O'Connell	Bone by Bone
9	Jeffery Deaver	Roadside Crosses
10	Freeman Wills Crofts	Antidote to Venom
10	Peter Tremayne	Hemlock at Vespers and other stories

Japanese
Rank	Author	Title
1	Yutaka Maya	Sekigan no Shojo (隻眼の少女)
2	Yu Shizaki (ja)	Sakebi to Inori (叫びと祈り)
3	Shinzo Mitsuda	Mizuchi no gotoki Shizumu Mono (水魑の如き沈むもの)
4	Taku Ashibe	Kisokyu Satsujin Jiken (綺想宮殺人事件)
5	NANAKAWA Kanan (ja)	Arubatorosu wa Habatakanai (アルバトロスは羽ばたかない)
6	Yutaka Maya	Kizoku Tantei (貴族探偵)
7	Soji Shimada	Sharaku Tojita Kuni no Maboroshi (写楽 閉じた国の幻)
8	Ban Madoi (ja)	Maruta Machi Ruvowaru (丸太町ルヴォワール)
9	Tokuya Higashigawa	Nazotoki wa Dina no Ato de (謎解きはディナーのあとで)
10	Jun Kurachi	Komegura (こめぐら)

== 2012 ==
2012 Honkaku Mystery Best 10 (Hara Shobo. December, 2011)

International
Rank	Author	Title
1	D. M. Devine	Three Green Bottles
2	Jack Kerley	Blood Brother
3	Thomas W. Hanshew	Cleek: the Man of the Forty Faces
4	Ann Cleeves	Red Bones
5	Hal White	The Mysteries of Reverend Dean
6	Edward D. Hoch	(Simon Ark series)
7	Georgette Heyer	Death in the Stocks
8	David Gordon	The Serialist
9	Michael Connelly	The Overlook
10	Helen McCloy	Through a Glass, Darkly

Japanese
Rank	Author	Title
1	Honobu Yonezawa	Oreta Ryukotsu (折れた竜骨)
2	Yutaka Maya	Merukatoru Kaku Katariki (メルカトルかく語りき)
3	Hiroko Minagawa	Hirakaseteitadaki Koeidesu (開かせていただき光栄です)
4	Kyo Shirodaira (ja)	Kyoko Suiri Kojin Nanase (虚構推理 鋼人七瀬)
5	Yusuke Kishi	Kagi no Kakatta Heya (鍵のかかった部屋)
6	Itsuki Nagasawa	Shoshitsu Guradeshon (消失グラデーション)
7	Kiyoshi Kasai	Kyuketsuki to Seishin Bunseki (吸血鬼と精神分析)
8	Shogo Utano	Misshitsu Satsujin Gemu Maniakkusu (密室殺人ゲーム・マニアックス)
9	Tokuya Higashigawa	Hokago wa Misuteri to Tomo ni (放課後はミステリーとともに)
10	Yasuhiko Nishizawa	Akai Ito no Umeki (赤い糸の呻き)

== 2013 ==
2013 Honkaku Mystery Best 10 (Hara Shobo. December, 2012)

International
Rank	Author	Title
1	Patrick Quentin	Puzzle for Pilgrims (aka. The Fate of the Immodest Blonde)
2	Leo Bruce	At Death's Door
3	Jim Kelly	The Fire Baby
4	Patrick Quentin	A Puzzle for Fools
5	Jeffery Deaver	The Burning Wire
6	Patrick Quentin	Puzzle for Players
7	Georgette Heyer	Behold, Here's Poison
8	Edward D. Hoch	(Simon Ark series)
8	Roy Vickers	The Exploits of Fidelity Dove
10	Fred Vargas	Sans feu ni lieu

Japanese
Rank	Author	Title
1	Rintaro Norizuki	Kingu o Sagase (キングを探せ)
2	Seiichiro Oyama	Misshitsu Shushuka (密室蒐集家)
3	Yukito Ayatsuji	Kimenkan no Satsujin (奇面館の殺人)
4	Shinzo Mitsuda	Yujo no gotoki Uramu Mono (幽女の如き怨むもの)
5	Yugo Aosaki (ja)	Taiikukan no Satsujin (体育館の殺人)
6	Alice Arisugawa	Egami Jiro no Dosatsu (江神二郎の洞察)
7	Ryo Amane (ja)	Soshiki Kumikyoku (葬式組曲)
8	Soji Shimada	Arukatorazu Genso (アルカトラズ幻想)
9	Taku Ashibe	Suchimu Opera (スチームオペラ)
10	Sei Hatsuno	Kamara to Amara no Oka (カマラとアマラの丘)

== 2014 ==
2014 Honkaku Mystery Best 10 (Hara Shobo. December, 2013)

International
Rank	Author	Title
1	Edmund Crispin	Beware of the Trains
2	Max Afford	Blood on His Hands!
3	Jack Kerley	In the Blood
4	D. M. Devine	Sunk Without Trace
5	Jeffery Deaver	More Twisted
6	Helen McCloy	The Goblin Market
7	Patrick Quentin	Puzzle for Puppets
8	Eric Keith	Nine Man's Murder
9	Edward D. Hoch	(Simon Ark series)
10	Rupert Penny	Policeman in Armour

Japanese
Rank	Author	Title
1	Yutaka Maya	Kizoku Tantei Tai Onna Tantei (貴族探偵対女探偵)
2	Yugo Aosaki	Suizokukan no Satsujin (水族館の殺人)
3	Yu Shizaki	Ribasaido Chirudoren [Riverside Children] (リバーサイド・チルドレン)
4	Rintaro Norizuki	Nokkusu Mashin [Knox's Machine] (ノックス・マシン)
5	Rintaro Norizuki	Hanzai Horosukopu 2 (犯罪ホロスコープII)
6	Yasumi Kobayashi	Arisu-Goroshi (アリス殺し)
6	Masaki Tsuji	Gesaku Tanjo Satsujin Jiken (戯作・誕生殺人事件)
8	Shogo Utano	Komori to Komori (コモリと子守り)
9	Soji Shimada	Seiro no Umi (星籠の海)
10	Honobu Yonezawa	Rikashiburu [Recursi-ble] (リカーシブル)

== 2015 ==
2015 Honkaku Mystery Best 10 (Hara Shobo. December, 2014)

International
Rank	Author	Title
1	Helen McCloy	The One That Got Away
2	Anthony Berkeley Cox	Not to Be Taken (aka. A Puzzle in Poison)
3	Leo Bruce	Dead for a Ducat
4	Patrick Quentin	Black Widow
5	Jim Kelly	The Moon Tunnel
6	Minette Walters	Chickenfeed and The Tinder Box
6	Margery Allingham	The Case of the Old Man in the Window and other stories
8	Kate Morton	The Secret Keeper
9	Stuart Palmer & Craig Rice	People vs. Withers and Malone
10	Pierre Lemaitre	Alex

Japanese
Rank	Author	Title
1	Yutaka Maya	Sayonara Kamisama (さよなら神様)
2	Honobu Yonezawa	Mangan (満願)
3	Mikihiko Renjo	Chiisana Ihojin (小さな異邦人)
4	Taku Ashibe	Ijigen no Yakata no Satsujin (異次元の館の殺人)
5	Hidefumi Okada (ja)	Kokuryuso no Sangeki (黒龍荘の惨劇)
6	Yabusaka Hayasaka (ja)	Marumarumarumarumarumarumarumaru Satsujin Jiken (○○○○○○○○殺人事件)
7	Hajime Tsukato	Misshitsu no Misaroji [Mythology] (密室の神話)
8	Yugo Aosaki	Kazegaoka Goju-en-dama Matsuri no Nazo (風ヶ丘五十円玉祭りの謎)
9	Akiko Miki (ja)	Satsui no Kozu (殺意の構図)
10	Takaki Hiraishi (ja)	Matsutani Keibu to Mitaka no Ishi (松谷警部と三鷹の石)

== 2016 ==
Covering books published in Japan between November 2014 and October 2015.

Japanese

1. Mystery Arena (ミステリー・アリーナ) by Reiichiro Fukami (深水黎一郎)
2. Katagiri Daizaburo to XYZ no Higeki (片桐大三郎とXYZの悲劇) by Atsushi Kurachi (米澤穂信)
3. Ō to Sākasu (王とサーカス) by Yonezawa Honobu (米澤穂信)
4. Orugōryen'nu (オルゴーリェンヌ) by Kitayama Takekuni (北山猛邦)
5. Sono Kanōsei wa Sude ni Kangaeta (その可能性はすでに考えた) by Inoue Magi (井上真偽)
6. Akai Hakubutsukan (赤い博物館) by Ōyama Seiichirō (大山誠一郎)
7. Kagi no Kakatta Otoko (鍵の掛かった男) by Arisugawa Arisu (有栖川有栖)
8. Tōkyō Ketsugō Ningen (東京結合人間) by Shirai Yomoyuki (白井智之)
9. Shi to Sunadokei (死と砂時計) by Torikai Hiu (鳥飼否宇)
10. Hoshi Satoru-jima ni Hoshi wa Nagareta (星読島に星は流れた) by Kuzumi Shiki (久住四季)

International

1. Doctors Also Die by D.M. Devine
2. Who's Calling? by Helen McCloy
3. A Ring of Roses by Christianna Brand
4. Buried Alive by Jack Kerley
5. Remote Control by Harry Carmichael
6. The Dogs Do Bark by Patrick Quentin
7. Travail Soigné by Pierre Lemaire
8. Death At Dyke's Corner by E. C. R. Lorac
9. Dead Water by Anne Cleeves
10. A Room to Die in by Ellery Queen

== See also ==
- Honkaku Mystery Award
- Japanese detective fiction
- Kono Mystery ga Sugoi!
- Tozai Mystery Best 100
- The Top 100 Crime Novels of All Time
