= The Moai Island Puzzle =

The Moai Island Puzzle (孤島パズル, Kotō Pazuru; "Solitary Island Puzzle") is a 1989 Japanese mystery novel by Alice Arisugawa that falls into the honkaku (本格) subgenre of Japanese detective fiction. The novel is the second in a series featuring Jirō Egami as detective and the first Arisugawa book to be translated into English. It details a series of murders that occur among a group of vacationers on an island off Japan's coast. Like other novels in the same series, a character named Alice Arisugawa takes part in the events and narrates them to readers by breaking the fourth wall.

The novel was ranked #16 on Kono Mystery ga Sugoi! 1989, an annual mystery fiction guide book published in Japan, and #95 on Tozai Mystery Best 100 in 2012.

The first English-language translation was published by Locked Room International in 2016.
