= Ayukawa Tetsuya Award =

Japanese literary award

- Native name: 鮎川哲也賞
- Description: Annual Japanese literary award for unpublished mystery novels
- Country: Japan
- Presented by: Tokyo Sogensha
- First award: 1990; 36 years ago

The Ayukawa Tetsuya Award (鮎川哲也賞, Ayukawa Tetsuya Shō) is an annual Japanese literary award for unpublished mystery novels. It was established in 1990 by Tokyo Sogensha, a Japanese publisher mainly publishing genre fiction books. The winning novel is published by the publisher and the winner receives a statue of Arthur Conan Doyle.

The award was named after Tetsuya Ayukawa (1919–2002), a Japanese writer who mainly wrote the Golden-Age-style detective fiction.

== Winners ==
	Year	Winner	Winning entry	Available in English Translation
1	1990	Taku Ashibe	Satsujin Kigeki no Jūsan-nin (殺人喜劇の13人) lit. Thirteen in a Murder Comedy	
2	1991	Shinsuke Ishikawa (ja)	Furenzokusen (不連続線)	
3	1992	Tomoko Kano (ja)	Nanatsu no Ko (ななつのこ)	
4	1993	Fumie Kondo (ja)	Kogoeru Shima (凍える島) lit. Frozen Island	
5	1994	Akira Aikawa (ja)	Keshin (化身)	
6	1995	Ko Kitamori (ja)	Kyōran Nijūshi-kō (狂乱廿四孝)	
7	1996	Taro Mitsusaka (ja)	Kaizokumaru Hyōchaku Ibun (海賊丸漂着異聞)	
8	1997	Kenji Kodama (ja)	Mimei no Akumu (未明の悪夢)	
9	1998	Katsunori Asukabe (ja)	Junkyō Katerina Sharin (殉教カテリナ車輪)	
10	1999		no applicable work	
11	2001	Noriyuki Monzen (ja)	Kenchiku Shizai (建築屍材)	
12	2002	Hitoshi Goto (ja)	Sukuriputoriumu no Meikyū (写本室の迷宮)	The Labyrinth of the Scriptorium
13	2003	Akiko Moriya (ja)	Sennen no Shijima: Ihon Genji Monogatari (千年の黙 異本源氏物語)	
14	2004	Keijiro Kamizu (ja)	Oni ni Sasageru Yasōkyoku (鬼に捧げる夜想曲)	
14	2004	Ruriko Kishida (ja)	Misshitsu no Rekuiemu [Requiem] (密室の鎮魂歌)	
15	2005		no applicable work	
16	2006	Kazushi Asami (ja)	Vesariusu [Vesalius] no Hitsugi (ヴェサリウスの柩)	
17	2007	Yoshihiro Yamaguchi (ja)	Unjō-Toshi no Dai-Bōken (雲上都市の大冒険)	
18	2008	Nanakawa Kanan (ja)	Nanatsu no Umi o Terasu Hoshi (七つの海を照らす星)	
19	2009	Sako Aizawa (ja)	Gozen Reiji no Sandoriyon [Cendrillon] (午前零時のサンドリヨン)	
20	2010	Junichi Aman (ja)	Bodī Messēji [Body Message] (ボディ・メッセージ)	
20	2010	Wataru Tsukihara (ja)	Taiyō ga Shinda Yoru (太陽が死んだ夜)	
21	2011	Ayato Yamada (ja)	Megane-ya wa Kieta (眼鏡屋は消えた)	
22	2012	Yugo Aosaki (ja)	Taiikukan no Satsujin (体育館の殺人)	
23	2013	Tetsuya Ichikawa (ja)	Meitantei no Shōmei (名探偵の証明)	
24	2014	Jun Uchiyama (ja)	Biriyādo [Billiard] Hanabusa e Yōkoso (Bハナブサへようこそ)	
25	2015	no applicable work		
26	2016	Yūto Ichikawa (ja)	Jelly Fish wa Kōranai (ジェリーフィッシュは凍らない)	
27	2017	Masahiro Imamura(ja)	Shijinsou no Satsujin (屍人荘の殺人)	Death Among the Undead
27	2018	Kouhei Kawasumi(ja)	Tantei ha Kyōshitsu ni Inai (探偵は教室にいない)	
28	2019	Kie Houjyō(ja)	Jikūryokousya no Sunadokei (時空旅行者の砂時計)	
29	2020	Rio Senda(ja)	Goshiki no Satsujinsha (五色の殺人者)	
30	2021	no applicable work		
31	2022	no applicable work		
32	2023	Yoshitaka Okamoto(ja)	Death on a Sailing Warship (帆船軍艦の殺人)	
33	2024	Mio Yamaguchi(ja)	Forbidden Child (禁忌の子)	
34	2025	no applicable work		

== Members of the selection committee ==
- From 1990 (1st) to 1995 (6th)
  - Tetsuya Ayukawa, Kawataro Nakajima, Junichiro Kida
- From 1996 (7th)
  - Tetsuya Ayukawa, Takao Tsuchiya, Alice Arisugawa
- From 1997 (8th) to 1999 (10th)
  - Soji Shimada, Yukito Ayatsuji, Alice Arisugawa
- From 2001 (11th) to 2002 (12th)
  - Tetsuya Ayukawa, Soji Shimada, Kiyoshi Kasai
- From 2003 (13th)
  - Soji Shimada, Kiyoshi Kasai
- From 2004 (14th) to 2008 (18th)
  - Soji Shimada, Kiyoshi Kasai, Masaki Yamada
- From 2009 (19th) to 2011 (21st)
  - Soji Shimada, Kiyoshi Kasai, Masaki Yamada, Kaoru Kitamura
- From 2012 (22nd) to 2013 (23rd)
  - Kaoru Kitamura, Masaki Tsuji, Taku Ashibe
- From 2014 (24th)
  - Kaoru Kitamura, Masaki Tsuji, Fumie Kondo

== See also ==
Japanese mystery awards for unpublished novels

- Edogawa Rampo Prize
- Mephisto Prize
- Agatha Christie Award

Japanese mystery awards for best works published in the previous year

- Mystery Writers of Japan Award
- Honkaku Mystery Award
