= Honkaku Mystery Writers Club of Japan =

Japanese organization for mystery writers

Honkaku Mystery Writers Club of Japan (本格ミステリ作家クラブ, Honkaku Misuteri Sakka Kurabu) is a Japan-based organization for mystery writers who write honkaku (i.e. authentic, orthodox) mystery.

The organization was founded on 3 November 2000 by Yukito Ayatsuji, Natsuhiko Kyogoku, Hiroko Minagawa, Kaoru Kitamura, Tetsuya Ayukawa and other mystery writers. It is currently chaired by Rintaro Norizuki and claims about 170 members.

It presents the Honkaku Mystery Awards to writers every year and produces the annual anthology.

== Honkaku mystery ==
Honkaku (i.e. authentic, orthodox) mystery is one of subgenres of mystery fiction that focuses on "fair play". Mystery novels written during the "Golden Age" of the mystery novel (e.g., the Ellery Queen novels) are regarded as examples of honkaku mystery.

== Presidents ==
1. Alice Arisugawa (2000–2005) (ja:有栖川有栖)
2. Kaoru Kitamura (2005–2009)
3. Masaki Tsuji (2009–2013)
4. Rintaro Norizuki (2013–2017)
5. Tokuya Higashigawa (2017–2021) (ja:東川篤哉)
6. Yutaka Maya (2021– ) (ja:麻耶雄嵩)

== Anthologies ==
The HMC started producing the annual anthology in 2001.

- Honkaku Mystery 01 (Kodansha, Tokyo, 2001, ISBN 4-06-182195-4)
- Honkaku Mystery 02 (Kodansha, Tokyo, 2002, ISBN 4-06-182251-9)
- Honkaku Mystery 03 (Kodansha, Tokyo, 2003, ISBN 4-06-182320-5)
- Honkaku Mystery 04 (Kodansha, Tokyo, 2004, ISBN 4-06-182377-9)
- Honkaku Mystery 05 (Kodansha, Tokyo, 2005, ISBN 4-06-182435-X)
- Honkaku Mystery 06 (Kodansha, Tokyo, 2006, ISBN 4-06-182484-8)
- Honkaku Mystery 07 (Kodansha, Tokyo, 2007, ISBN 978-4-06-182530-7)
- Honkaku Mystery 08 (Kodansha, Tokyo, 2008, ISBN 978-4-06-182599-4)
- Honkaku Mystery 09 (Kodansha, Tokyo, 2009, ISBN 978-4-06-182654-0)
- Honkaku Mystery 10 (Kodansha, Tokyo, 2010, ISBN 978-4-06-182720-2)
- Best Honkaku Mystery 2011 (Kodansha, Tokyo, 2011, ISBN 978-4-06-182782-0)
- Best Honkaku Mystery 2012 (Kodansha, Tokyo, 2012, ISBN 978-4-06-182837-7)
- Best Honkaku Mystery 2013 (Kodansha, Tokyo, 2013, ISBN 978-4-06-182870-4)
- Best Honkaku Mystery 2014 (Kodansha, Tokyo, 2014, ISBN 978-4-06-299016-5)
- Best Honkaku Mystery 2015 (Kodansha, Tokyo, 2015, ISBN 978-4-06-299047-9)

== See also ==
- Honkaku Mystery Best 10
- Golden Age of Detective Fiction#Enduring influence
- Detective fiction
- Japanese detective fiction
- Whodunit
- Mystery Writers of Japan
