= Agatha Christie Award (Japan) =

Literary award for unpublished mystery novels

The Agatha Christie Award (アガサ・クリスティー賞) is a Japanese literary award established in 2010 in commemoration of the 120th anniversary of Agatha Christie's birth. The award is presented by Hayakawa Publishing Corporation in association with the Agatha Christie Society, which is chaired by Mathew Pritchard, the grandson of Agatha Christie.

It is the literary award for unpublished mystery novels. The winning work, which is selected from more than 100 entries, is published by Hayakawa Publishing Corporation and the winner receives a prize of 1,000,000 yen.

== Winners ==
	Year	Winner	Winning entry	Available in English Translation
1	2011	Akimaro Mori (ja)	Kuroneko no Yūho Aruiwa Bigaku Kōgi (黒猫の遊歩あるいは美学講義)	The Black Cat Takes a Stroll: The Edgar Allan Poe Lectures
2	2012	Yuka Nakazato (ja)	Kampanyura no Gin'yoku (カンパニュラの銀翼) lit. Silver Wings of the Campanula	
3	2013	Yoichi Misawa (ja)	Chishiryō Miman no Satsujin (致死量未満の殺人) lit. Murder by Nonlethal Dose	
4	2014	Chiemi Matsuura (ja)	Shidare-zakura Koi Shinjū (しだれ桜恋心中)	
5	2015	Toshihiko Shimizu (ja)	Usotsuki, Usotsuki (うそつき、うそつき) lit. Liar, Liar	

== See also ==
Japanese mystery awards for unpublished novels

- Edogawa Rampo Prize
- Ayukawa Tetsuya Award
- Mephisto Prize

Japanese mystery awards for best works published in the previous year

- Mystery Writers of Japan Award
- Honkaku Mystery Award
