= Mushitarō Oguri =

Japanese mystery novelist

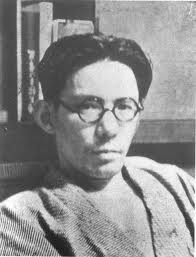
- Mushitarō Oguri.
- Born: Eijirō Oguri; 14 March 1901; Kanda, Tokyo, Japan
- Died: 10 February 1946 (aged 44); Chiyoda, Tokyo, Japan
- Occupation: Author
- Writing career
- Genre: Detective stories
- Notable works: Black Death Hall Murders; Perfect Crime

Mushitarō Oguri (小栗 虫太郎, Oguri Mushitarō; March 14, 1901 – February 10, 1946), born Eijirō Oguri, was a Japanese author and an important mystery novelist in pre-war Japan.

== Biography ==
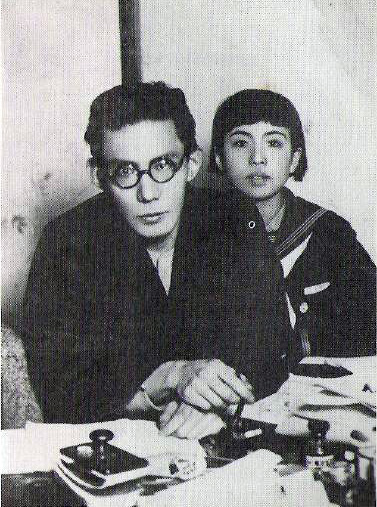
Oguri with his daughter

Oguri was born in Kanda, Tokyo. His father died in 1911, and the family managed to support themselves financially thanks to the support of the main family branch and the income from renting a house.

In September 1922, Oguri began working at a printer. During this period, he took interest in literature, and during the four years he worked there, he wrote a series of detective novels and stories: Aru Kenji no Isho, Gen'naiyaki Mujutsu Osho, Benigara Rakuda no Himitsu and Madōji. These last three works would later be published in 1936 (Aru Kenji no Isho was published in 1927).

== Major works ==
Oguri's major works include:

- Black Death Hall Murders (Kokushikan Satsujinjiken, 黒死館殺人事件)
- Perfect Crime (Kanzen Hanzai, 完全犯罪)

According to researcher Sari Kawana, he was one of the authors involved in writing "mad scientist murders," a subgenre within the larger stream of Japanese detective fiction during the 1920s and 1930s. He used the motif of the "mad scientist" and his uncompromising attitude toward his work to criticize the widespread overconfidence in the possibilities of science and to highlight the potential incompatibility between science and ethics. Other writers involved in that genre were Kozakai Fuboku, Yumeno Kyusaku, and Unno Juza.

== See also ==
- Japanese literature
- List of Japanese authors
