= Roger Scarlett =

Roger Scarlett was the pen name of Dorothy Blair (1903–1976) and Evelyn Page (1902–1977), who were life partners and in the early 1930s wrote five golden age mystery novels together. They are believed to be the "first same-sex couple to write mysteries."

== About the authors ==
Evelyn Page was born to a prominent Philadelphia family and graduated from Bryn Mawr in 1923. She worked as an aircraft inspector during World War II and was a sergeant in the Women's Army Corps. Page later went into academia, becoming an assistant professor of English at Smith College, Northampton (1949–1956), where Sylvia Plath was one of her students, and afterwards was assistant professor at Connecticut College, New London (1956–1964). She also wrote two books under her own name: The Chestnut Tree (1964), a novel, and American Genesis: Pre-Colonial writing in the North (1973), an academic study on travel narratives in North America before 1700. In the 1930s she was a book columnist for The Washington Post.

Dorothy Blair was born in Bozeman, Montana, where her father was a local doctor. She graduated from Vassar in 1924. Both Blair and Page worked as editors in the 1920s at Houghton Mifflin, where they met each other. After living together in Boston, they moved to Abington, Connecticut, where they lived in a stone farmhouse from the 1800s.

== The Roger Scarlett novels ==
In all of the five Roger Scarlett novels, the main detective who solves the case is Inspector Norton Kane, a member of the Boston police department. The novels are whodunits in the tradition of S.S. Van Dine and Ellery Queen. Although the novels had soon been translated into other languages (e.g. French and Japanese), they went out of print for decades. In 2017, Coachwhip Publications collected all of the novels in three volumes; in 2022, one novel was included in Penzler Publishers' "American Mystery Classics" series.

The novels are noted for their "meticulously detailed maps and puzzling plots." In the First Degree was named one of murder mysteries of the month in 1932 by Time Magazine while The Bookman called The Back Bay Murders "cleverly written." In addition, Cat's Paw has been called "another gem in the American Mystery Classics series" by Publishers Weekly while Booklist called the novel "a classic closed-circle mystery."

In 2007, a translation of In the First Degree was named to the Honkaku Mystery Best 10 in Japan.

== Plagiarism of The Back Bay Murders ==
One of the Roger Scarlett novels, The Back Bay Murders, was plagiarized by Don Basil in his mystery Cat and Feather. Basil's novel was released in 1931 by Grosset & Dunlap in the United Kingdom and republished by Henry Holt and Company in the United States. The only changes Basil made were to swap the setting of Boston in The Back Bay Murders to a London suburb, change the character names, and alter the American spellings of words for English ones.

After becoming aware of the plagiarism, Henry Holt and Company withdrew Basil's novel from publication. According to Ned Guymon, a collector of detective fiction, this was "probably the most glaring piece of plagiarism ever to exist."

It was later learned that Don Basil was a pseudonym of Morris/Maurice Balk, a career criminal from England.

== Bibliography ==
- The Beacon Hill Murders
  - First Edition: Doubleday, Doran & Co. 1930
  - Included in "The Roger Scarlett Mysteries, Vol. 1", Coachwhip Publications 2017, ISBN 978-1616464219
- The Back Bay Murders
  - First Edition: Doubleday, Doran & Co. 1930
  - Included in "The Roger Scarlett Mysteries, Vol. 1", Coachwhip Publications 2017, ISBN 978-1616464219
- Cat's Paw
  - First Edition: Doubleday, Doran & Co. 1931
  - Included in "The Roger Scarlett Mysteries, Vol. 2", Coachwhip Publications 2017, ISBN 978-1616464226
  - "American Mystery Classics" edition, Penzler Publishers 2022, ISBN 978-1613162835, with an introduction by Curtis Evans
- Murder among the Angells
  - First Edition: Doubleday, Doran & Co. 1932
  - Included in "The Roger Scarlett Mysteries, Vol. 2", Coachwhip Publications 2017, ISBN 978-1616464226
- In the First Degree
  - First Edition: Doubleday, Doran & Co. 1933
  - Included in "The Roger Scarlett Mysteries, Vol. 3", Coachwhip Publications 2017, ISBN 978-1616464233
