= Honobu Yonezawa =

Japanese writer (born 1978)

- Born: 1978 (age 47–48); Gifu Prefecture, Japan
- Occupation: Writer
- Writing career
- Language: Japanese
- Period: 2001–present
- Genres: Mystery fiction, young adult fiction, light novel
- Notable awards: Mystery Writers of Japan Award (2011)
- Website: pandreamium.sblo.jp

Honobu Yonezawa (米澤 穂信, Yonezawa Honobu; born 1978) is a Japanese writer, best known for his young adult mystery series Kotenbu, also known as the Classic Literature Club series.

== Biography ==
Honobu Yonezawa was born in 1978 in Gifu Prefecture.

From as young as he could remember, Yonezawa wanted to be a writer. At 11 years old, he wrote a sequel to H. G. Wells's The War of the Worlds, and started writing original novels in the second year of junior high school. In his second year of Kanazawa University studying literature, he started publishing his works on his site Hanmuden (汎夢殿) (the website was temporarily shut down after his official debut and these works are currently unavailable). His early work were diverse in genre, but Yonezawa was struck when he read Kaoru Kitamura's Flying Horse (空飛ぶ馬) and Princess in Rokunomiya (六の宮の姫君) while in university, and decided to turn his attention to writing mysteries.

After graduating from university, Yonezawa convinced his parents to let him try and attain his dream of writing a novel for two years. He got a job as a bookstore clerk in Takayama while he continued writing on the side. In 2001, he officially debuted with the novel Hyōka, (氷菓) which received an honorable mention in the 5th Kadokawa Gakuen Novel Young Person Mystery and Horror Category Awards (角川学園小説大賞). His decision to submit was fueled by positive reception of Hyōka on his website Hanmuden, that he personally saw a future in the combination of light novels and mysteries, and because he was late for the deadline of another award. Hyōka became the first novel in a series dubbed the Classic Literature Club (古典部) series, to be distributed by the newly established Sneaker Mystery Club within the Kadokawa Sneaker Bunko imprint. Hyōka was soon followed with Gusha no Endorōru (愚者のエンドロール) in 2002.

However, when Yonezawa had completed the draft for the third and what he intended to be the final book in the Classic Literature Club series, the label was going on hiatus due to changing trends in the market, so he could not get it published. Despite this, he was approached by Tokyo Sogensha who inquired what he was working on, thanks partly to recommendations from writers Kiyoshi Kasai and Kazuki Sakuraba. When he explained the situation to the publisher, they asked to see the draft and after a few days they requested rights to publish it. After discussions between Kadokawa, Tokyo Sogensha and Yonezawa, they agreed to have the novel published, and after changing details such as the characters and the setting, Sayonara Yōsei (さよなら妖精) was published in 2004. It was featured in the magazine Kono Mystery ga Sugoi! (このミステリーがすごい!) in 2005, ranking 20th in the domestic category.

In the same year, he published Shunki Gentei Ichigo Taruto Jiken (春期限定いちごタルト事件), the first novel of the Shōshimin (小市民) series.

Around the same time, he moved from Gifu to Tōkyō.

In 2008, when Yonezawa published Hakanai Hitsuji tachi no Shukuen (儚い羊たちの祝宴), he states that he started not only paying attention to the riddles present within his works, but also how they appeal to a wider audience. So when he published Oreta Ryūkotsu (折れた竜骨) in 2010, which incorporated some fantasy elements to an otherwise classical mystery story, it won the 64th Mystery Writers of Japan Award for the following year.

In 2012, Kyoto Animation aired an anime adaptation of the Classic Literature Club series under the name of the first novel, Hyōka.

Since 2013, he has been on the selection committee for the Mysteries! Rookie of the Year Award (ミステリーズ!新人賞).

In 2014, his short story collection Mangan (満願) was selected as one of the best mysteries in the Mystery ga Yomitai!, (ミステリーが読みたい!) Shūkan Bunshun Mystery Best 10, (週刊文春ミステリーベスト10) and Kono Mystery ga Sugoi! It was ranked the top in domestic rankings and became the first book in history to receive three simultaneous rankings from different publications. It also won the 27th Yamamoto Shūgorō Prize and the 151st Naoki Prize.

In 2016, he was selected by literary magazine Granta in their Japanese edition as one of the Granta Best of Young Japanese Novelists.

In 2024, the first two novels of the Shōshimin Series were adapted into an anime produced by Lapin Track, and released under the name Shōshimin: How to Become Ordinary.

In 2026, his historical novel Kokurōjō (The Samurai and the Prisoner) was adapted into a film of the same name, written and directed by Kiyoshi Kurosawa.

== Awards and nominations ==
- Hyōka (or Hyouka) [lit. Frozen Dessert] (Novel)
  - 2001 – The Encouragement Prize in the 5th Kadokawa School Novel Prize (Kadokawa Gakuen Shōsetsu Taishō), YA Mystery/Horror category
- "Kokoroatari no Aru Mono wa" [lit. "Anyone Who Knows"] (Short story)
  - 2007 – Nominee for Mystery Writers of Japan Award for Best Short Story
- Inshite Miru [Incite Mill] (Novel)
  - 2008 – Nominee for Honkaku Mystery Award for Best Novel
- Tsuisō Godanshō [lit. Five morceaux of Reminiscence] (Novel)
  - 2010 – Nominee for Mystery Writers of Japan Award for Best Novel
  - 2010 – Nominee for Honkaku Mystery Award for Best Novel
- Oreta Ryūkotsu [lit. Broken Keel] (Novel)
  - 2011 – Mystery Writers of Japan Award for Best Novel
  - 2011 – The Best Japanese Mystery Fiction of the Year (2012 Honkaku Mystery Best 10)
  - 2011 – Nominee for Honkaku Mystery Award for Best Novel
  - 2011 – Nominee for Yamamoto Shūgorō Prize
- Mangan (Novel)
  - 2014 – Yamamoto Shūgorō Prize
  - 2014 – Nominee for Naoki Prize
- Kokurōjō (Novel)
  - 2021 – Yamada Fūtarō Prize
  - 2021 – Naoki Prize

== Bibliography ==
=== Hyōka series (Classic Literature Club series) ===
==== Novels ====
- Hyōka (氷菓), 2001
- Gusha no Endorōru (愚者のエンドロール), 2002
- Kudoryafuka no Junban (クドリャフカの順番), 2005
- Futari no Kyori no Gaisan (ふたりの距離の概算), 2010

==== Short story collections ====
- Tōmawari Suru Hina (遠まわりする雛), 2007
  - Yarubeki Koto nara Temijika ni (やるべきことなら手短に)
  - Taizai o Okasu (大罪を犯す)
  - Shōtai Mitari (正体見たり)
  - Kokoroatari no Aru Mono wa (心あたりのある者は)
  - Akimashite Omedetō (あきましておめでとう)
  - Tezukuri Chokorēto Jiken (手作りチョコレート事件)
  - Tōmawari Suru Hina (遠まわりする雛)
- Imasara Tsubasa to Iwaretemo (いまさら翼といわれても), 2016
  - Hako no Naka no Ketsuraku (箱の中の欠落)
  - Kagami niwa Utsuranai (鏡には映らない)
  - Renpō wa Harete Iru ka (連峰は晴れているか)
  - Watashitachi no Densetsu no Issatu (わたしたちの伝説の一冊)
  - Nagai kyūjitsu (長い休日)
  - Imasara Tsubasa to Iwaretemo (いまさら翼といわれても)

=== Shōshimin Series ===
==== Novels ====
- Shunki Gentei Ichigo Taruto Jiken (春期限定いちごタルト事件), 2004
- Kaki Gentei Toropikaru Pafe Jiken (夏期限定トロピカルパフェ事件), 2006
- Shūki Gentei Kuri Kinton Jiken (秋期限定栗きんとん事件), 2009
- Tōki Gentei Bonbon Shokora Jiken (冬期限定ボンボンショコラ事件), 2024

==== Short story collection ====
- Pari Makaron no Nazo (巴里マカロンの謎), 2020

==== Standalone mystery novels ====
- Sayonara Yōsei (さよなら妖精), 2004
- Inu wa Doko da (犬はどこだ), 2005
- Botorunekku [Bottleneck] (ボトルネック), 2006 (A partial translation of Bottleneck at Tufts Digital Library)
- Inshite Miru [Incite Mill] (インシテミル), 2007
- Hakanai Hitsuji tachi no Shukuen (儚い羊たちの祝宴), 2008
- Tsuisō Godanshō (追想五断章), 2009
- Oreta Ryūkotsu (折れた竜骨), 2010
- Rikāshiburu [Recursible] (リカーシブル), 2009
- Mangan (満願), 2014
- Hon to Kagi no Kisetsu (本と鍵の季節), 2018
- Ai no Higeki (Iの悲劇), 2019
- The Samurai and the Prisoner (黒牢城, Kokurōjō), 2021

== Film adaptations ==
- The Incite Mill (2010, directed by Hideo Nakata) (based on the novel Inshite Miru)
- Hyouka (2017, directed by Mari Asato)
- The Samurai and the Prisoner (2026, directed by Kiyoshi Kurosawa)

== See also ==
- Japanese detective fiction
