= Alice Arisugawa =

Japanese mystery writer (born 1959)

Masahide Uehara
- Born: April 26, 1959 (age 67); Higashisumiyoshi-ku, Osaka, Japan
- Occupation: Writer
- Writing career
- Pen name: Arisu Arisugawa
- Language: Japanese
- Period: 1989–present
- Genres: Whodunit, closed circle mystery, mystery fiction, thriller, horror
- Notable awards: Mystery Writers of Japan Award (2003); Honkaku Mystery Award (2008)
- Literary movement: The new traditionalist movement

Masahide Uehara (上原 正英, Uehara Masahide; born April 26, 1959), known by his pen name Alice Arisugawa (有栖川有栖, Arisugawa Arisu), is a Japanese mystery writer. He is one of the representative writers of the new traditionalist movement in Japanese mystery writing and was the first president of the Honkaku Mystery Writers Club of Japan from 2000 to 2005. He has also served as part of the selection committee for various literary awards, most notably the Ayukawa Tetsuya Award from 1996 to 1999 and Edogawa Rampo Prize from 2014 to 2017.

== Recognition ==
- 1996 – Nominee for 49th Mystery Writers of Japan Award for Best Short Story: "Chocho ga Habataku"
- 2003 – 56th Mystery Writers of Japan Award for Best Novel: Mare Tetsudo no Nazo (The Malayan Railway Mystery)
- 2003 – Nominee for 3rd Honkaku Mystery Award for Best Fiction: Mare Tetsudo no Nazo (The Malayan Railway Mystery)
- 2004 – Nominee for 4th Honkaku Mystery Award for Best Fiction: Suisu-dokei no Nazo (The Swiss Watch Mystery)
- 2007 – The Best Japanese Crime Fiction of the Year (2007 Honkaku Mystery Best 10): Ran'a no Shima
- 2008 – 8th Honkaku Mystery Award for Best Fiction: Jookoku no Shiro (The Castle of the Queendom)
- 2008 – The Best Japanese Crime Fiction of the Year (2008 Honkaku Mystery Best 10): Jookoku no Shiro (The Castle of the Queendom)
- 2016 – 5th Osaka Honma Book Award: Maboroshi-zaka
- 2018 – 3rd Yoshikawa Eiji Collection Award: Himura Hideo Series

== Bibliography ==
=== Student Alice series (Amateur Detective Egami series) ===
Novels

- Gekko Gemu (月光ゲーム Yの悲劇'88), 1989 (The Moonlight Game: The Tragedy of Y 1988)
- Koto Pazuru (孤島パズル), 1989 (The Moai Island Puzzle. Locked Room International. 2016)
- Soto no Akuma (双頭の悪魔), 1992 (Double-Headed Devil)
- Jookoku no Shiro (女王国の城), 2007 (The Castle of the Queendom)

Short story collection

- Egami Jiro no Dosatsu (江神二郎の洞察), 2012

=== Writer Alice series (Criminology Professor Himura series) ===
Novels

- Yonju Roku-banme no Misshitsu (46番目の密室), 1992
- Dari no Mayu (ダリの繭), 1993
- Umi no Aru Nara ni Shisu (海のある奈良に死す), 1995
- Suweden Yakata no Nazo (スウェーデン館の謎), 1995 (The Swedish House Mystery)
- Shuiro no Kenkyu (朱色の研究), 1997
- Mare Tetsudo no Nazo (マレー鉄道の謎), 2002 (The Malayan Railway Mystery)
- Ran'a no Shima (乱鴉の島), 2006
- Kagi no Kakatta Otoko (鍵の掛かった男), 2015
- Kariudo no Akumu (狩人の悪夢), 2017
- Indo Kurabu no Nazo (インド倶楽部の謎), 2018 (The Indian Club Mystery)
- Sosasen Jo no Yubae (捜査線上の夕映え), 2022

Short story collections

- Roshia Kocha no Nazo (ロシア紅茶の謎), 1994 (The Russian Tea Mystery)
- Burajiru Cho no Nazo (ブラジル蝶の謎), 1996 (The Brazilian Butterfly Mystery)
- Eikoku Teien no Nazo (英国庭園の謎), 1997 (The English Garden Mystery)
- Perusha Neko no Nazo (ペルシャ猫の謎), 1999 (The Persian Cat Mystery)
- Kurai Yado (暗い宿), 2001
- Zekkyo Jo Satsujin Jiken (絶叫城殺人事件), 2001
- Suisu-dokei no Nazo (スイス時計の謎), 2003 (The Swiss Watch Mystery)
- Shiroi Usagi ga Nigeru (白い兎が逃げる), 2003
- Morokko Suisho no Nazo (モロッコ水晶の謎), 2005 (The Moroccan Crystal Mystery)
- Kisaki wa Fune o Shizumeru (妃は船を沈める), 2008
- Himura Hideo ni Sasageru Hanzai (火村英生に捧げる犯罪), 2008
- Nagai Roka ga Aru Ie (長い廊下がある家), 2010
- Kogen no Fudanitto (高原のフーダニット), 2012
- Bodaijuso no Satsujin (菩提樹荘の殺人), 2013
- Ayashii Mise (怪しい店), 2014
- Kanada Kinka no Nazo (カナダ金貨の謎), 2019 (The Canadian Coin Mystery)

=== Sora series (Sorashizu Jun series) ===
- Yami no Rappa (闇の喇叭), 2010
- Mayonaka no Tantei (真夜中の探偵), 2011
- Ronri Bakudan (論理爆弾), 2012

=== Hamaji Kenzaburou series ===
- Hamaji Kenzaburou no Kushibi Naru Jikenbo (濱地健三郎の霊なる事件簿), 2017
- Hamaji Kenzaburou no Kakure Taru Jikenbo (濱地健三郎の幽たる事件簿), 2020

=== Standalone novels ===
- Majikku Mira (マジックミラー), 1990
- Genso Unga (幻想運河), 1996
- Yurei Deka (幽霊刑事), 2000
- Mahoro-shi no Satsujin Fuyu: Shinkiro ni Te o Furu (まほろ市の殺人 冬―蜃気楼に手を振る), 2002
- Nijihate-mura no Himitsu (虹果て村の秘密), 2003

=== Short story collections ===
- Yamabushi Jizobo no Horo (山伏地蔵坊の放浪), 1996
- Jurietto no Himei (ジュリエットの悲鳴), 1998
- Sakka Shosetsu (作家小説), 2001
- Kabenuke Otoko no Nazo (壁抜け男の謎), 2008
- Akai Tsuki, Haieki no Ue ni (赤い月、廃駅の上に), 2009
- Maboroshi-zaka (幻坂), 2013
- Koushite Dare mo Inakunatta (こうして誰もいなくなった), 2019

=== Works in English translation ===
- The Moai Island Puzzle (original title: Kotō Pazuru), trans. Ho-Ling Wong (Locked Room International, 2016)
- Ghost Detective (original title: Yurei Deka), trans. Cathy Hirano (Pushkin Vertigo, 2026)

== See also ==
- Honkaku Mystery Writers Club of Japan
- Japanese detective fiction
