= Jack Kerley =

American author

Jack Kerley is an American author. He spent 20 years in an advertising career before writing his first book. He lives in Newport, Kentucky, and is married with two children.

== Writing ==
Jack Kerley is the author of the Carson Ryder novels, with the thirteenth installment appearing in 2017. His short stories are "Almost There", published in Southern Review, Spring 2004, University of Louisiana Press, and "A Season of Moles", published in Stories from the Blue Moon Café III: Anthology of Southern Writers, McAdam/Cage, 2004, ed. Sonny Brewer. Kerley's books have been translated into ten languages and published primarily in England now.

=== Books ===
Carson Ryder series

- The Hundredth Man; E.P. Dutton; 320 pp. ISBN 0-525-94821-X (hardcover)
- The Death Collectors; E.P. Dutton; 320 pp. ISBN 0-525-94877-5 (hardcover)
  - (Japan) Best Translated Honkaku Mystery of the Decade (2000–2009)
- The Broken Souls or A Garden Of Vipers (USA); E.P.Dutton; 334 pp. ISBN 0-525-94952-6 (hardcover)
- Blood Brother; HarperCollins; ISBN 978-0-00-726907-5
- In the Blood
- Little Girls Lost; HarperCollins; 400 pp. ISBN 0-00-721435-9
- Buried Alive
- Her Last Scream
- The Killing Game
- The Death Box
- The Memory Killer
- The Apostle
- The Death File
- Buried Alive
