= Juran Hisao =

Japanese author (1902–1957)

Jūran Hisao
- 久生 十蘭
- Born: 6 April 1902; Hakodate, Hokkaidō, Japan
- Died: 6 October 1957 (aged 55); Kamakura, Kanagawa, Japan
- Occupations: Writer and journalist
- Writing career
- Genres: short stories, popular fiction, stage drama

Jūran Hisao (久生 十蘭, Hisao Jūran; 6 April 1902 – 6 October 1957) was the pen-name of a Japanese author of popular fiction in Shōwa period Japan. Hisao Jūran was a pioneer in the use of black humor in Japanese literature. His works reflect his extensive knowledge of a wide range of subjects, and displayed extraordinary skills, and range from mystery tales to humor, and both historical and contemporary settings. His real name was Masao Abe (阿部 正雄, Abe Masao).

== Early life ==
Hisao was a native of Hakodate on the northern Japanese island of Hokkaidō. While working for the Hakodate branch of the Mainichi Shimbun newspaper, he wrote poetry and drama in his spare time.

In 1926, he moved to Tokyo, where he convinced the playwright, Kunio Kishida, to accept him as a student. In 1929, he went to Paris, France to study physics (specializing in optics, and at the same time, he was able to learn about the French theater from the actor-director, Charles Dullin.

== Career ==
On returning to Japan, Hisao Jūran obtained a post as an assistant stage director with the New Tsukiji Theater. However, his interests were very broadly based, and he also contributed mystery stories to the magazine Shin Seinen ("New Youth"). His fiction included the dark detective story Kinrō ("Golden Wolf"), which was also the first time he adopted the pen-name of "Hisao Jūran". Several other works followed, and in 1936 he was offered the post of lecturer on the theory of theater at the Department of Literature at Meiji University. In 1937, he joined the Bungakuza theatre company organized by his mentor Kishida. He also began translating works of detective fiction by noted French authors (including Gaston Leroux) into Japanese. The extra income enabled him to purchase a summer home in the resort area of Karuizawa, Nagano.

In 1940, Kishida became a Director of Culture for the Taisei Yokusankai political party, and at his request, Hisao Jūran wrote a short story, the "Village Pilot" in 1941. He was also sent to central China in 1941 as part of the party's efforts to boost troop morale. Hisao Jūran married to the niece of Osaragi Jirō's wife in 1942. In 1943, he was drafted into the Imperial Japanese Navy and sent to the South Pacific. He was reported as missing-in-action for a period, but returned safely to Chōshi, Chiba in 1944. He lived in Chōshi in 1946, but from 1947, he relocated to the Zaimokuza area of Kamakura, Kanagawa prefecture, where he lived until his death.

His short story, Suzuki Mondō, won the 11th Naoki Prize in 1951, and his novelette Boshizo, earlier serialized in the Mainichi Shimbun, gained him first place in a New York Herald Tribune short story contest in 1955.

Hisao Jūran died of esophageal cancer in 1957 at the age of 55. His grave is at the Zaimokuza Reien Cemetery in Kamakura.

== See also ==
- Japanese literature
- List of Japanese authors
- List of solved missing person cases (pre-1950)
