= James Anderson (British author) =

British author

James Anderson (b. Swindon, Wiltshire 1936 – d. Penarth, Glamorganshire 2007) was a British author. He is best known for his books featuring Inspector Wilkins. Set in the 1930s, the action of the books takes place in a large fictional British estate, or stately home, belonging to George Henry Aylvin Saunders, the 12th Earl of Burford. The books are a humorous look at the Golden Age type of mystery, which feature whodunnits set during a house party, and contain joking references to Inspector Appleby, the detective created by Michael Innes, or Inspector Alleyn, created by Ngaio Marsh, and to the well-known private detective Hercule Poirot, invented by Agatha Christie.

Anderson also wrote novelizations based on the television series Murder, She Wrote.

He died in 2007 in Penarth, Vale of Glamorgan.

== Bibliography ==
Inspector Wilkins books

- The Affair of the Blood-stained Egg Cosy [McKay-Washburn 1975]
- The Affair of the Mutilated Mink
- The Affair of the 39 Cufflinks

Novelizations based on Murder, She Wrote

- The Murder of Sherlock Holmes [Avon 1985]
- Hooray for Hollywood
- Lovers and Other Killers

Mikael Petros books

- Assassin [Simon & Schuster 1971]
- The Abolition of Death {Constable 1974]

Other works

- The Alpha List
- Appearance of Evil [Constable 1977]
- Angel of Death [Constable 1978]
- Assault and Matrimony
- Auriol
- Additional Evidence
