= Asa Nonami =

Japanese writer (born 1960)

- Born: 19 August 1960 (age 66); Tokyo, Japan
- Occupation: Writer
- Writing career
- Language: Japanese
- Period: 1988–present
- Genres: Crime fiction, thriller, horror
- Notable awards: Naoki Prize (1996)

Asa Nonami (乃南アサ, Nonami Asa; born 19 August 1960) is a Japanese crime fiction and horror writer. She is a member of the Mystery Writers of Japan.

Nonami attended Waseda University where she studied Sociology but dropped out to take a job at an advertising agency. She became a published author in 1988.

== Works in English translation ==
Crime/thriller novels

- The Hunter (original title: Kogoeru Kiba), trans. Juliet Winters Carpenter (Kodansha International, 2006)
- Now You're One of Us (original title: Anki), trans. Michael Volek and Mitsuko Volek (Vertical, 2007)

Short horror story collection

- Body (original title: Karada), trans. Takami Nieda (Vertical, 2012)

== Awards ==
- 1988 – The Japanese Mystery and Suspense Award (Nihon Suiri Sasupensu Taisho): Kōfuku na Chōshoku (A Happy Breakfast)
- 1996 – Naoki Prize: The Hunter
- 2011 – Chuokoron Prize for Literature: Chi no Hate kara

== Main works ==
=== Detective Takako Otomichi series ===
- Novels
  - Kogoeru Kiba (凍える牙), 1996
    - The Hunter, Kodansha International, 2006. ISBN 9784770030252, OCLC 225652219
  - Kusari (鎖), 2000
  - Kaze no Epitafu (風の墓碑銘), 2006
- Short story collections
  - Hana Chiru Koro no Satsujin (花散る頃の殺人), 1999
  - Miren (未練), 2001
  - Warau Yami (嗤う闇), 2004

=== Standalone novels ===
- Kōfuku na Chōshoku (幸福な朝食), 1988
- Anki (暗鬼), 1993
  - Now You're One of Us, Vertical, 2007. ISBN 9781934287033, OCLC 144596946
- Namida (涙), 2000
- Chi no Hate kara (地のはてから), 2010

=== Short story collections ===
- Karada (躯), 1999
  - Body, Vertical, 2012. ISBN 9781934287378, OCLC 753305836
- Kinryōku (禁猟区), 2010

== Film adaptations ==
Japanese film

- Heels of the Muse (2005) (Based on Nonami's short story Boku ga Juken ni Seikō Shita Wake (僕が受験に成功したわけ))

South Korean film

- Howling (2012) (Based on Nonami's novel The Hunter)

== See also ==
- Japanese detective fiction
