= Hiroko Minagawa =

Japanese writer (born 1930)

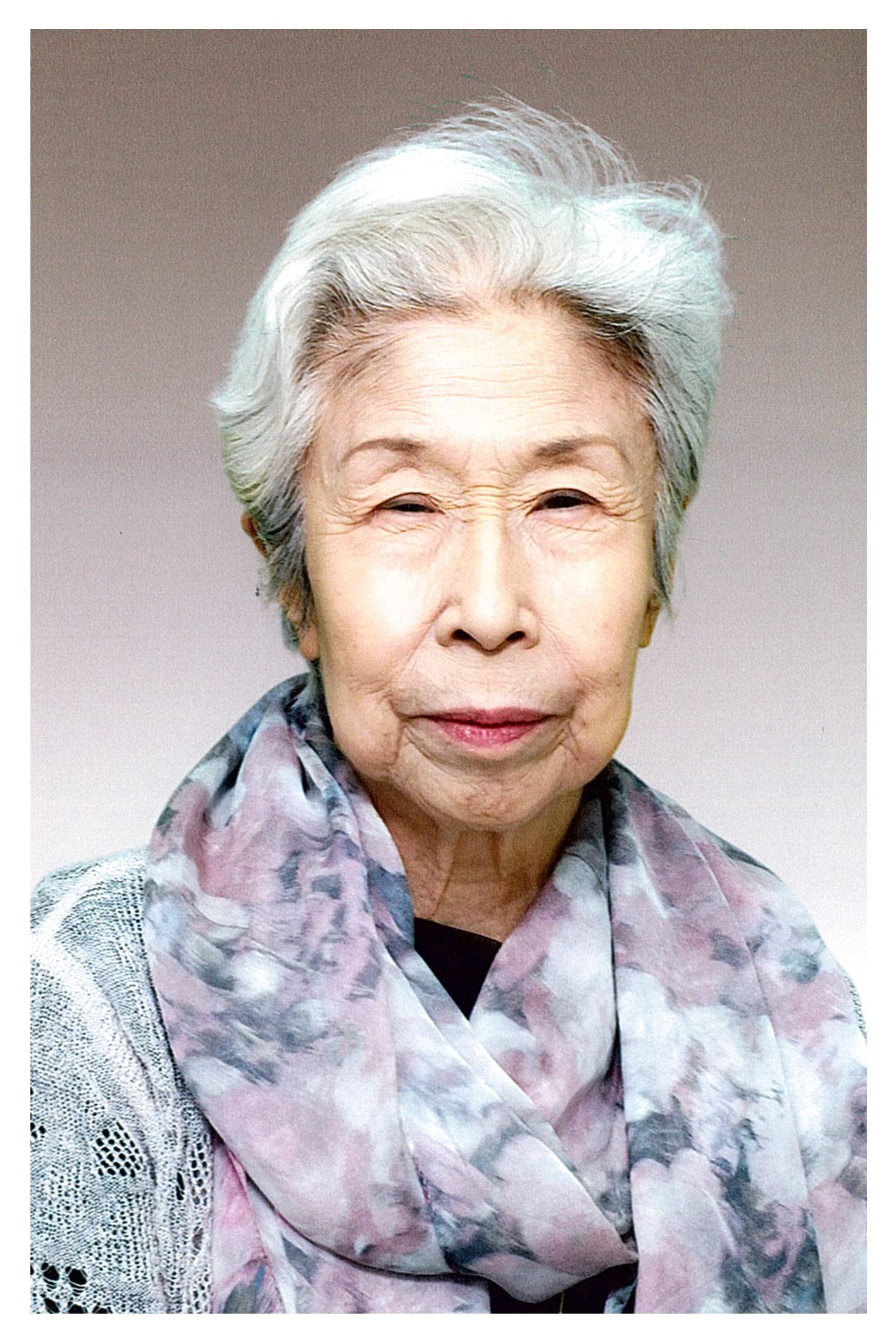
- Born: 2 January 1930 (age 96); Keijoo, Korea (present-day Seoul, South Korea)
- Occupation: Writer
- Writing career
- Language: Japanese
- Period: 1972–present
- Genres: Mystery, fantasy, horror, historical fiction
- Notable awards: Mystery Writers of Japan Award (1985); Naoki Prize (1986); Honkaku Mystery Award (2012)

Hiroko Minagawa (皆川博子, Minagawa Hiroko; born 2 January 1930) is a Korean-born Japanese writer of mystery, fantasy, horror and historical fiction.

== Works in English translation ==
Novels

- The Resurrection Fireplace (original title: Hirakasete Itadaki Kōei Desu), trans. Matt Treyvaud, Bento Books, 2019

Short stories

- "The Midsummer Emissary" (original title: Fuzuki no Shisha), trans. Ginny Tapley Takemori (Kaiki: Uncanny Tales from Japan, Volume 3: Tales of the Metropolis, Kurodahan Press, 2012)
- "Sunset" (original title: Yuhi ga Shizumu), trans. Karen Sandness (Speculative Japan 3: Silver Bullet and Other Tales of Japanese Science Fiction and Fantasy, Kurodahan Press, 2012)

== Awards ==
- 1973 – Shosetsu Gendai New Writers Prize: Arukadia no Natsu (アルカディアの夏) (short story)
- 1985 – Mystery Writers of Japan Award for Best Novel: Kabe Tabishibai Satsujin Jiken (壁 旅芝居殺人事件) (mystery novel)
- 1986 – Naoki Prize: Koi Kurenai (恋紅) (historical novel)
- 1990 – Shibata Renzaburo Prize: Baraki (薔薇忌) (fantasy short story collection)
- 1998 – Yoshikawa Eiji Prize for Literature: Shi no Izumi (死の泉) (mystery novel)
- 2012 – Honkaku Mystery Award: The Resurrection Fireplace (mystery novel)
- 2013 – Japan Mystery Literature Award for Lifetime Achievement

== Main works ==
=== Edward Turner series ===
Historical mystery series set in 18th-century London

- Hirakasete Itadaki Koei desu (開かせていただき光栄です), 2011 (The Resurrection Fireplace)
- Armonica Diabolica (アルモニカ・ディアボリカ), 2013
- Interview with the Prisoner (インタヴュー・ウィズ・ザ・プリズナー), 2021

=== Other mystery novels ===
- Raidā wa Yami ni Kieta (ライダーは闇に消えた), 1975
- Hikari no Haikyo (光の廃墟), 1978
- Hana no Tabi Yoru no Tabi (花の旅夜の旅), 1979
- Niji no Higeki (虹の悲劇), 1982
- Kiri no Higeki (霧の悲劇), 1982
- Shiretoko Misaki Satsujin Jiken (知床岬殺人事件), 1984
- Sōma Nomaoi Satsujin Jiken (相馬野馬追い殺人事件), 1984
- Kabe Tabishibai Satsujin Jiken (壁 旅芝居殺人事件), 1984
- Hikaru Genji Satsujin Jiken (光源氏殺人事件), 1985
- Zeami Satsujin Jiken (世阿弥殺人事件), 1986
- Ayakashi-Gura Satsujin Jiken (妖かし蔵殺人事件), 1986
- Chūshingura Satsujin Jiken (忠臣蔵殺人事件), 1986
- Satsui no Karuizawa Fuyu (殺意の軽井沢・冬), 1987
- Yami Tsubaki (闇椿), 1988
- Seijo no Shima (聖女の島), 1988
- Kaoshi Rentarō to Itsutsu no Nazo (顔師・連太郎と五つの謎), 1989
- Shi no Izumi (死の泉), 1997
- Tōritsu Suru Tō no Satsujin (倒立する塔の殺人), 2007

=== Other ===
- Kaizokujouou (海賊女王), 2013 - The story of Grace O'Malley

== Film adaptations ==
- Sharaku (1995; based on her 1994 historical novel, Sharaku)

== See also ==
- Japanese detective fiction
