= Taku Ashibe =

Japanese mystery writer (born 1958)

- Born: 21 May 1958 (age 68); Osaka, Japan
- Occupation: Writer
- Writing career
- Language: Japanese
- Period: 1990–present
- Genres: Whodunit, locked room mystery, detective fiction, mystery fiction, thriller, horror
- Notable awards: Ayukawa Tetsuya Award (1990)
- Literary movement: The new traditionalist movement

Taku Ashibe (芦辺 拓, Ashibe Taku; born 21 May 1958) is a Japanese mystery writer. He is a member of the Honkaku Mystery Writers Club of Japan and one of the representative writers of the new traditionalist movement in Japanese mystery writing.

== Works in English translation ==
Novel

- Murder in the Red Chamber (original title: Kōrōmu no Satsujin), trans. Tyran C. Grillo (Kurodahan Press, 2012)
- Murder in the House of Omari (original title: Ōmarike Satsujin Jiken), trans. Bryan Karetnyk (Pushkin Vertigo, 2025)

Short story

- "The Horror in the Kabuki Theatre" (original title: "Gohei Gekijō: Kabuki no Kuni Cthulhu Taiji"), trans. Sheryl Hogg (Lairs of the Hidden Gods 2: Inverted Kingdom, Kurodahan Press, 2005)
- "The Mummy and the Unicorn" (original title: "Miira to Unikōru"), trans. Nancy H. Ross (Strokes of Brush and Blade: Tales of the Samurai, Kurodahan Press, 2019)
- "The Dashing Joker" (original title: "Shikku-suru Jōkā"), trans. Yuko Shimada (Ellery Queen's Mystery Magazine, September/October, 2020)

== Awards and nominations ==
- 1990 – Ayukawa Tetsuya Award for New Mystery Writers: Satsujin Kigeki no Jūsan-nin (Thirteen in a Murder Comedy)
- 2002 – Nominee for Honkaku Mystery Award for Best Fiction: Guran Ginyōru Jō (The Castle of Grand Guignol)
- 2005 – Nominee for Honkaku Mystery Award for Best Fiction: Murder in the Red Chamber
- 2009 – Nominee for Honkaku Mystery Award for Best Fiction: Saiban'in Hōtei (The Lay Judge Court)
- 2011 – Nominee for Honkaku Mystery Award for Best Fiction: Kisōkyū Satsujin Jiken
- 2013 – Nominee for Honkaku Mystery Award for Best Fiction: Suchīmu Opera (Steam Opera)
- 2018 – Drunkard Bookseller's Award for: Kitan o Uru mise (The Shop that Sells Strange Tales)
- 2022 – Mystery Writers of Japan Award and Honkaku Mystery Award for Best Fiction: Ōmarike Satsujin Jiken (The Ōmari Family Murder Case)

== Bibliography ==
=== Detective Shunsaku Morie series ===
- Novels
  - Satsujin Kigeki no Jūsan-nin (殺人喜劇の13人; lit. Thirteen in a Murder Comedy), 1990
  - Rekishi Kaidō Satsujin Jiken (歴史街道殺人事件; lit. The Historic Road Murder Case), 1995
  - Toki no Yūkai (時の誘拐; lit. The Kidnap in the Time), 1996
  - Rosuto Wārudo no Satsujin (地底獣国の殺人; lit. The Lost World Murders), 1997
  - Jūsanbanme no Baishin'in (十三番目の陪審員; lit. The 13th Jury), 1998
  - Fushigi no Kuni no Aribai (不思議の国のアリバイ; lit. Alibi in Wonderland), 1999
  - Kaijin Tai Meitantei (怪人対名探偵; lit. The Fiend versus the Detective), 2000
  - Wadokei no Yakata no Satsujin (和時計の館の殺人; lit. Murder at the House of Japanese Clock), 2000
  - Toki no Misshitsu (時の密室; lit. The Locked Room in the Time), 2001
  - Guran Ginyōru Jō (グラン・ギニョール城; lit. The Castle of Grand Guignol), 2001
  - Sen'ichiya no Yakata no Satsujin (千一夜の館の殺人; lit. Murder at the House of Thousand and One Nights), 2006
  - Kanojora wa Yuki no Meikyū ni (彼女らは雪の迷宮に; lit. In the Snow Labyrinth, They...), 2008
  - Kisōkyū Satsujin Jiken (綺想宮殺人事件; lit. The Palace of Bizarre Idea Murder Case), 2010
  - Shichi-nin no Tantei no Tame no Jiken (七人の探偵のための事件; lit. Case for Seven Detectives), 2011
  - Purinsesu ni Sasageru Misshitsu (大公女殿下に捧げる密室; lit. The Locked Room for Her Grand Ducal Highness), 2012
  - Toki no Shintei (時の審廷; lit. The Court in the Time), 2013
  - Ijigen no Yakata no Satsujin (異次元の館の殺人; lit. Murder at the House of Another Dimension), 2014
  - Daburu misuteri Gekkin-Tei no Satsujin / Non-shiriaru Kirā (ダブル・ミステリ 月琴亭の殺人 / ノンシリアル・キラー; lit. Double Mystery: Murder in the Hotel Yueqin / The Nonserial Killer), 2016
  - Tsuruya Nanboku no Satsujin (鶴屋南北の殺人; lit. Murder of Tsuruya Nanboku), 2020
- Short story collections
  - Tantei Sengen: Morie Shunsaku no Jikenbo (探偵宣言 森江春策の事件簿; lit. Detective Declaration: The Casebook of Shunsaku Morie), 1998
  - Sekishibyō no Yakata no Satsujin (赤死病の館の殺人; lit. Murder at the House of Red Death), 2001
  - Sanbyaku-nen no Nazo-Bako (三百年の謎匣; lit. The Puzzle Box of 300 years), 2005
  - Shōnen wa Tantei o Yumemiru: Morie Shunsaku Kuronikuru (少年は探偵を夢見る 森江春策クロニクル; lit. A Boy Dreams of Being a Detective: The Chronicle of Shunsaku Morie), 2006
  - Saiban'in Hōtei (裁判員法廷; lit. The Lay Judge Court), 2008
  - Morie Shunsaku no Sainan (森江春策の災難; lit. The Misadventure of Shunsaku Morie), 2022

=== Modern City series ===
- Satsujin Kigeki no Modan Shitī (殺人喜劇のモダン・シティ; lit. The Modern City of Murder Comedy), 1994 – Novel
- Shōjo Tantei wa Teito o Kakeru (少女探偵は帝都を駆ける; lit. Girl Sleuth Runs the Imperial capital), 2009 – Short story collection

=== Jichikei tokuso series ===
- Shitai no Samenai Uchi ni (死体の冷めないうちに; lit. Before the corpse is cold), 1998 – Short story collection
- Metoroporisu ni Shi no Wana o (メトロポリスに死の罠を; lit. Death trap for Metropolis), 2002 – Novel

=== Standalone mystery novels ===
- Hose Keibu Saidai no Bōken (保瀬警部最大の冒険; lit. Inspector Hose's Greatest Adventure), 1994
- Setsudan Toshi (切断都市; lit. The Amputated City), 2004
- Kōrōmu no Satsujin (紅楼夢の殺人), 2004 (Murder in the Red Chamber, Kurodahan Press, 2012)
- Suchīmu Opera [Steam Opera] (スチームオペラ), 2012
- Ōmarike Satsujin Jiken (大鞠家殺人事件; lit. The Ōmari Family Murder Case), 2021
- Ōedo Kigan Jō (大江戸奇巌城; lit. The Hollow Needle in Edo), 2023

=== Short story collections ===
- Mentantei Z: Fukanō Suiri (名探偵Z 不可能推理; lit. Z, The Great Detective: The Impossible Reasoning), 2002
- Koroshi wa Erekiteru: Donsai Sensei Jikenchō (殺しはエレキテル 曇斎先生事件帳; lit. Murder by 'Erekiteru': Mr. Donsai's Case File), 2003
- Gohei Gekijō: Karakuri-Dōrō (五瓶劇場 からくり灯籠; lit. Gohei's Theatre: Trick Lantern), 2007
  - Keisei Denki Jō (けいせい伝奇城)
  - Gohei no Chikara Nazo no Fūjime (五瓶力謎緘)
  - Hana no Miyako Sharaku no Sugao (花都写楽貌)
  - Kabuki no Kuni Cthulhu Taiji (戯場国邪神封陣) (The Horror in the Kabuki Theatre)
- Meitantei Hakurankai: Shinsetsu Rupan (Lupin) Tai Hōmuzu (Holmes) (名探偵博覧会 真説ルパン対ホームズ; lit. Detective Exposition: Lupin versus Holmes, The True Story), 2000
- Meitantei Hakurankai 2: Akechi Kogorō Tai Kindaichi Kōsuke (名探偵博覧会II 明智小五郎対金田一耕助; lit. Detective Exposition II: Kogorō Akechi vs Kōsuke Kindaichi), 2002
- Tantei to Kaijin no Iru Hoteru (探偵と怪人のいるホテル; lit. The Hotel with Detective and Fiend), 2006
- Meikyū Panoramakan (迷宮パノラマ館; lit. Labyrinthine Panorama Pavilion), 2007
- Ōgon Mugen Jō Satsujin Jiken (黄金夢幻城殺人事件; lit. The Golden Dream Castle Murder Case), 2011
- Kindaichi Kōsuke VS Akechi Kogorō (金田一耕助VS明智小五郎), 2013
- Kitan o Uru Mise (奇譚を売る店; lit. The Shop that Sells Strange Tales), 2013
- Gakufu to Tabisururu Otoko (楽譜と旅する男; lit. The Man Who Travelled With Sheet Music), 2017
- Teito Tantei Taisen (帝都探偵大戦; Chronicles of the Detectives), 2017
- Ojisan no Toranku Gentō Shōgekijō (おじさんのトランク 幻燈小劇場; lit. Uncle's Trunk: The Magic Lantern Theatre), 2019
- Meitantei Sōtōjō: Ashibe Taku to Jūsan no Nazo (名探偵総登場 芦辺拓と13の謎; lit. Enter All Detectives: Taku Ashibe and the 13 Mysteries), 2020
- Meitantei wa Dareda (名探偵は誰だ; lit. Who's the Detective?), 2022

=== Juvenile mystery novels ===
- Neo Detective Boys series
  - Yōki Jō no Himitsu (妖奇城の秘密; lit. The Secret of Weird Castle), 2004
  - Densō Kaijin (電送怪人; lit. The Teleporting Fiend), 2005
  - Nazo no Jiorama Ōkoku (謎のジオラマ王国; lit. Mysterious Diorama Kingdom), 2005
- Gesshoku Hime no Kisu (月蝕姫のキス; lit. Kiss of the Lunar Eclipse Princess), 2008
- Sukūru Gāru Ekusupuresu 38 [School Girl Express 38] (スクールガール・エクスプレス38), 2012
- Furiyagi Supika to Ma no Yōkan Jiken (降矢木すぴかと魔の洋館事件; lit. Supika Furiyagi and the Case of the Evil House), 2015

=== Historical fiction ===
- Min Shin Shippūroku: Yume, Tei Seikō Senki (明清疾風録 夢・鄭成功戦記; lit. The Whirlwind of Ming and Qing Dynasty: The Dream, Koxinga's War Story)
  - Vol.1, 1995
  - Vol.2, 1996
  - Vol.3, 1997
- Shin Nito Monogatari (新・二都物語; lit. New Tale of the Two Cities), 2018

== See also ==
- Golden Age of Detective Fiction#The "new traditionalist" movement in Japanese mystery writing
- Honkaku Mystery Writers Club of Japan
- Japanese detective fiction
