= Kosakai Fuboku =

- 小酒井 不木
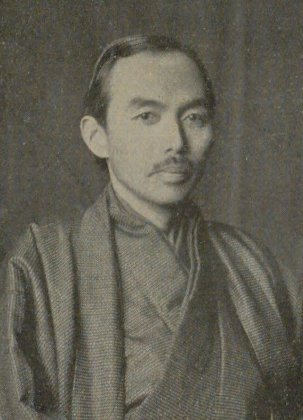
- From "Thanatopsis", date unknown
- Born: Kosakai Mitsuji 小酒井 光次; October 8, 1890; Kanie, Aichi Prefecture; Empire of Japan
- Died: April 1, 1929 (aged 38); Nagoya, Aichi Prefecture; Empire of Japan
- Education: Doctor of Medicine from Tokyo Imperial University
- Occupations: Biomedical scientist, Essayist, Translator, Crime writer, Criminologist
- Writing career
- Pen name: Kosakai Fuboku; Torii Reisui (Japanese: 鳥井 零水, as a translator)
- Language: Japanese
- Years active: 1922–1929 (as an essayist); 1925–1929 (as a story writer)
- Genres: Medical essay, Detective fiction, Weird fiction, Horror fiction

Kosakai Mitsuji (Japanese: 小酒井 光次, 8 October 1890 – 1 April 1929), better known by the pen name Kosakai Fuboku (Japanese: 小酒井 不木), was a Japanese medical scientist and crime writer.

A variant of the family name Kosakai is Kozakai.

== Biography ==
=== Early life ===
Mitsuji was born in Kanie, Aichi Prefecture, into a landlord family, and was moved to Nagoya by his father when he was young. He was described as a clever child who usually gained full scores in all the subjects except physical education. He entered the Third Higher School in Kyoto after graduating from middle school in Nagoya, then entered Tokyo Imperial University. The pen name "Fuboku" had been used since middle school.

=== As a medical student and then writer ===
Mitsuji studied physiology and serology at university. After graduating from university, he was sent to study abroad in the United States, the United Kingdom, and France. He was reportedly acquainted with Noguchi Hideyo while in the US. In 1919, he traveled to England, but developed a lung condition in June of that year and coughed up blood. He went to Brighton for a change of scenery and recuperation. After his condition stabilized somewhat, he returned to London temporarily. In the spring of 1920, he moved to Paris, coughed up blood again, and underwent convalescence in southern France. After his condition stabilized somewhat, he returned to Kobe in November. In October, he received his letter of appointment as Professor of Hygiene at the School of Medicine of Tohoku Imperial University.

In 1921, he earned his Doctor of Medicine degree. However, due to his illness, he was unable to travel to his post in Sendai and resigned from his position as a university professor.

After returning to Japan, he started serializing essays in newspapers under the pen name Fuboku, including medical essays and titles on criminology or literature. The articles about detective stories were noticed by the editor-in-chief of the magazine "Shinseinen", Morishita Uson.

In 1926, he published "Tōbyōjutsu" (Japanese: 闘病術), whose title literally means "The Art of Coping with Illness", and this is when the word tōbyō (Japanese: 闘病, "coping with illness") was first used before it became a common word in the Japanese language.

=== As a detective story translator and writer ===
Fuboku translated works of a Swedish author, Samuel Duse, from German translations, under the pen name Torii Reisui (Japanese: 鳥井 零水) in 1923. With encouragement from Edogawa Ranpo, who was mentored by Fuboku and Uson, Fuboku started to create. Although he had tried writing novels while in university and had serialized some stories for children, he regarded his debut work as the 1925 short story "Noroware No Ie" (Japanese: 呪われの家, "The Cursed Family"). In 1927, he serialized his only novel, "Gimon No Kurowaku" (Japanese: 疑問の黒枠, "The Suspicious Black Frame"). It is said to have been adapted into a movie, but no evidence of the movie's existence has been found.

Because of the emphasis on anatomical details and pathological psychology, his style was described as "unhealthy" or "morbid" (Japanese: 不健全) by Hirabayashi Hatsunosuke, together with Edogawa Ranpo, Yokomizo Seishi, and Jō Masayuki.

=== Later years ===
Fuboku built a laboratory at his home in Nagoya in 1928 and started serology research. Meanwhile, he showed an intent to move his focus of activity to biomedical research in an essay "Pen Kara Shikenkan E" (Japanese: ペンから試験管へ, "From Pen to Test Tube").

He died of acute pneumonia on April 1, 1929.

== Legacy ==
=== Pinoeer of Japanese science fiction ===
The 1926 work "An Artificial Heart" (Japanese: 人工心臓) depicts in detail the process of manufacturing an artificial heart and expresses skepticism toward the anthropic mechanism. One of his representative stories, "Ren'ai Kyokusen" (Japanese: 恋愛曲線, "The Curves of Love"), was considered to share similar themes with "An Artificial Heart" about the relationship between physiological indicators and human emotions.

=== Relationship with Edogawa Ranpo ===
When Edogawa Ranpo sent his literary debut work "The Two-Sen Copper Coin" (Japanese: 二銭銅貨) to Morishita Uson, Uson praised the story and sent it to Fuboku. With the support of these two people, Ranpo was given the opportunity to have his work published. Ranpo contributed to editing the complete collection of Fuboku after his death.

=== Nenge Kukai ===
Fuboku was also active as an amateur haiku poet. He built a gathering of amateur haiku poets named Nenge Kukai in 1926, and the gathering is still active as of 2026.
