= Rintaro Norizuki =

Japanese mystery/crime writer (born 1964)

- Born: 15 October 1964 (age 61); Matsue, Shimane, Japan
- Occupation: Writer
- Writing career
- Language: Japanese
- Period: 1988–present
- Genres: Whodunit, Locked room mystery, Detective fiction, Mystery fiction, thriller
- Notable awards: Mystery Writers of Japan Award (2002); Honkaku Mystery Award (2005)
- Literary movement: The new traditionalist movement

Rintaro Norizuki (法月 綸太郎, Norizuki Rintarō; born 15 October 1964) is a Japanese writer of mystery and crime. He is the President of Honkaku Mystery Writers Club of Japan and one of the representative writers of the new traditionalist movement in Japanese mystery writing. His works have been influenced by Ellery Queen and Ross Macdonald.

== Works in English translation ==
Short stories

- "An Urban Legend Puzzle" (original title: Toshi Densetsu Pazuru), trans. Beth Cary
  - Ellery Queen's Mystery Magazine, January 2004
  - Passport to Crime: Finest Mystery Stories from International Crime Writers, Running Press, 2007 ISBN 978-0-7867-1916-7
  - The Mammoth Book of Best International Crime, Robinson Publishing, 2009 ISBN 978-1845299576
- "The Lure of the Green Door" (original title: Midori no Tobira wa Kiken), trans. Ho-Ling Wong
  - Ellery Queen's Mystery Magazine, November 2014
  - The Realm of the Impossible, Locked Room International, 2017, ISBN 978-1-5453-3922-0

== Awards ==
- 2000 – The Best Japanese Crime Fiction of the Year (2000 Honkaku Mystery Best 10): Norizuki Rintarō no Shin Bōken (The New Adventures of Rintaro Norizuki)
- 2002 – Mystery Writers of Japan Award for Best Short Story: An Urban Legend Puzzle
- 2005 – Honkaku Mystery Award for Best Fiction: Namakubi ni Kiite miro (The Gorgon's Look)
- 2005 – The Best Japanese Crime Fiction of the Year (2005 Kono Mystery ga Sugoi!): Namakubi ni Kiite miro (The Gorgon's Look)
- 2005 – The Best Japanese Crime Fiction of the Year (2005 Honkaku Mystery Best 10): Namakubi ni Kiite miro (The Gorgon's Look)
- 2013 – The Best Japanese Crime Fiction of the Year (2013 Honkaku Mystery Best 10): Kingu o Sagase (Find the King)

== Bibliography ==
=== Detective Rintaro Norizuki series ===
- Novels
  - Yuki Misshitsu (雪密室), 1989
  - Tasogare (誰彼), 1989
  - Yoriko no tame ni (頼子のために), 1990
  - Ichi no Higeki (一の悲劇), 1991
  - Futatabi Akai Akumu (ふたたび赤い悪夢), 1992
  - Ni no Higeki (二の悲劇), 1994
  - Namakubi ni Kiite miro (生首に聞いてみろ), 2004
  - Kingu o Sagase (キングを探せ), 2011
- Short story collections
  - Norizuki Rintarō no Bōken (法月綸太郎の冒険), 1992
  - Norizuki Rintarō no Shin Bōken (法月綸太郎の新冒険), 1999
  - Norizuki Rintarō no Kōseki (法月綸太郎の功績), 2002
    - Ikōru Wai no Higeki (イコールYの悲劇) (The Tragedy of Equal Y)
    - Chūgoku Katatsumuri no Nazo (中国蝸牛の謎) (The Chinese Snail Mystery)
    - Toshi Densetsu Pazuru (都市伝説パズル) (An Urban Legend Puzzle, Ellery Queen's Mystery Magazine, January 2004)
    - Ē Bī Shī Dī Hōimō (ABCD包囲網) (ABCD encirclement)
    - Ishin Denshin (縊心伝心)
  - Hanzai Horosukōpu 1: Roku-nin no Joō no Mondai (犯罪ホロスコープI 六人の女王の問題), 2008
  - Hanzai Horosukōpu 2: San-nin no Megami no Mondai (犯罪ホロスコープII 三人の女神の問題), 2012

=== Standalone novels ===
- Mippei Kyōshitsu (密閉教室), 1988
- Kaitō Gurifin, Zettai Zetsumei (怪盗グリフィン、絶体絶命), 2006 – Juvenile mystery novel

=== Short story collections ===
- Pazuru Hōkai (パズル崩壊), 1996
- Shiramitsubushi no Tokei (しらみつぶしの時計), 2008
- Nokkusu Mashin (Knox's Machine) (ノックス・マシン), 2013

== See also ==
- Golden Age of Detective Fiction#The "new traditionalist" movement in Japanese mystery writing
- Honkaku Mystery Writers Club of Japan
