= Yukito Ayatsuji =

Japanese writer (born 1960)

- Born: Naoyuki Uchida; December 23, 1960 (age 65); Kyoto, Japan
- Occupation: Writer
- Spouse: Fuyumi Ono
- Writing career
- Pen name: Yukito Ayatsuji
- Language: Japanese
- Period: 1987–present
- Genres: Whodunit, closed circle mystery, mystery fiction, thriller, horror
- Notable awards: Mystery Writers of Japan Award (1992)
- Movement: The new traditionalist movement

Signature
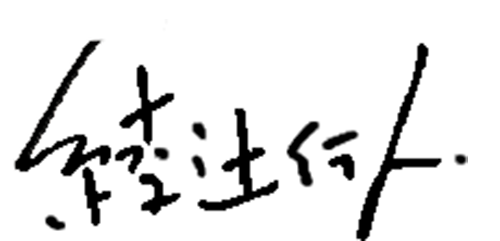

Naoyuki Uchida (内田 直行, Uchida Naoyuki; born December 23, 1960), known by his pen name Yukito Ayatsuji (綾辻 行人, Ayatsuji Yukito), is a Japanese writer of mystery and horror. He is one of the founders of Honkaku Mystery Writers Club of Japan and one of the representative writers of the new traditionalist movement in Japanese mystery writing. His wife is Fuyumi Ono, a Japanese fantasy and horror writer who is known for her fantasy series The Twelve Kingdoms.

His first novel The Decagon House Murders was ranked as the No. 8 novel on the Top 100 Japanese Mystery Novels of All Time.

In 2018, a minor planet (2001 RG46) was named as Yukito Ayatsuji.

== Translated works ==
Another series

- Another, translated by Karen McGillicuddy (Yen Press, 2013)
- Another Episode S/0, translated by Karen McGillicuddy (Yen Press, 2016)
- Another 2001, translated by Nicole Wilder (Yen Press, 2022)

Bizarre House/Mansion Murders series

- The Decagon House Murders (original title: Jukkakukan no Satsujin), translated by Ho-Ling Wong (Locked Room International, 2015)
- Meurtres dans le decagone (The Decagon House Murders), French translation (ISBN 2-9533-9621-7).
- The Mill House Murders (original title: Suishakan no Satsujin), translated by Ho-Ling Wong (Pushkin Vertigo, 2023)
- The Labyrinth House Murders (original title: Meirokan no Satsujin), translated by Ho-Ling Wong (Pushkin Vertigo, 2024)
- The Clock House Murders (original title: Tokeikan no Satsujin), translated by Ho-Ling Wong (Pushkin Vertigo, 2025 [UK]; 2026 [US])
- The Black Cat House Murders (original title: Kuronekokan no Satsujin), translated by Ho-Ling Wong (Pushkin Vertigo, 2027)

Short story

- Heart of Darkness (original title: Kokoro no Yami), translated by Daniel Jackson (Speculative Japan 3: Silver Bullet and Other Tales of Japanese Science Fiction and Fantasy, Kurodahan Press, 2012)

Essay

- My Favourite Mystery, "Farewell, My Mask" by Akimitsu Takagi (Mystery Writers of Japan, Inc. )

== Awards and nominations ==
- 1992 – Mystery Writers of Japan Award for Best Novel: Tokeikan no Satsujin (Clock Mansion Murders)
- 2005 – Nominee for Honkaku Mystery Award for Best Fiction: Ankokukan no Satsujin (Dark Mansion Murders)
- 2010 – Nominee for Honkaku Mystery Award for Best Fiction: Another

== Bibliography ==
=== Bizarre House/Mansion Murders series ===
- Jukkakukan no Satsujin (十角館の殺人), 1987 (The Decagon House Murders)
- Suishakan no Satsujin (水車館の殺人), 1988 (The Mill House Murders)
- Meirokan no Satsujin (迷路館の殺人), 1988 (The Labyrinth House Murders)
- Ningyōkan no Satsujin (人形館の殺人), 1989 (The Doll House Murders)
- Tokeikan no Satsujin (時計館の殺人), 1991 (The Clock House Murders)
- Kuronekokan no Satsujin (黒猫館の殺人), 1992 (The Black Cat House Murders)
- Ankokukan no Satsujin (暗黒館の殺人), 2004 (The Dark House Murders)
- Bikkurikan no Satsujin (びっくり館の殺人), 2006 (The Surprise House Murders)
- Kimenkan no Satsujin (奇面館の殺人), 2012 (The Queer Mask House Murders)

=== Whispering series ===
- Hiiro no Sasayaki (緋色の囁き), 1988 (The Scarlet Whispering)
- Kurayami no Sasayaki (暗闇の囁き), 1989 (The Darkness Whispering)
- Tasogare no Sasayaki (黄昏の囁き), 1993 (The Twilight Whispering)

=== Equation of Murder series ===
- Satsujin Hōteishiki: Setsudansareta Shitai no Mondai (殺人方程式 切断された死体の問題), 1989
- Satsujin Hōteishiki 2: Meifūsō Jiken (殺人方程式II 鳴風荘事件), 1995

=== Blood Thirsty Killer series ===
- Satsujinki: Kakusei-hen (殺人鬼 覚醒篇), 1990
- Satsujinki: Gyakushū-hen (殺人鬼 逆襲篇), 1993

=== Horror Stories of Midorogaoka series ===
A series of 28 short stories published from 2004 to 2016, which were collected in 3 volumes.

- Midorogaoka Kidan (深泥丘奇談), 2008
  - Kao (顔)
  - Oka no Mukō (丘の向こう)
  - Nagabiku Ame (長引く雨)
  - Akuryō Tsuki (悪霊憑き)
  - Samuzamushi (サムザムシ)
  - Akeruna (開けるな)
  - Rokuzan no Yoru (六山の夜)
  - Midorogaoka Majutsudan (深泥丘魔術団)
  - Koe (声)
- Midorogaoka Kidan Zoku (深泥丘奇談・続), 2011
  - Suzu (鈴)
  - Konekomegani (コネコメガニ)
  - Kurui-Zakura (狂い桜)
  - Kokoro no Yami (心の闇) (Heart of Darkness)
  - Ho wa Horā Eiga no Ho (ホはホラー映画のホ)
  - Midorogaoka San Jizō (深泥丘三地蔵)
  - Sou (ソウ)
  - Setsudan (切断)
  - Yoru Ugomeku (夜蠢く)
  - Rajio Tō (ラジオ塔)
- Midorogaoka Kidan Zoku Zoku (深泥丘奇談・続々), 2019
  - Tamamifuru (タマミフル)
  - Bōkyaku to Tsuioku (忘却と追憶)
  - Heranai Nazo (減らない謎)
  - Shigo no Yume (死後の夢)
  - Kanzume Kidan (カンヅメ奇談)
  - Uminari (海鳴り)
  - Yoru Oyogu (夜泳ぐ)
  - Neko Misshitsu (猫密室)
  - Neko Shizume (ねこしずめ)

=== Another series ===
- Another, 2009
- Another: Episode S (Another エピソードS, Anazā Episodo Esu), 2013
- Another 2001, 2020

=== Standalone novels ===
- Kirigoetei Satsujin Jiken (霧越邸殺人事件), 1990
- Saigo no Kioku (最後の記憶), 2002

=== Short story collections ===
- Gankyū Kitan (眼球綺譚), 1995
- Freaks (フリークス, Furīkusu), 1996
- Dondon-Bashi, Ochita (どんどん橋、落ちた), 1999
- Ningen Janai (人間じゃない), 2017

== See also ==
- Honkaku Mystery Writers Club of Japan
- Japanese detective fiction
