= Tozai Mystery Best 100 =

Book list

Tozai Mystery Best 100 (東西ミステリーベスト100, Tozai Misuteri Besuto 100; lit. The Top 100 Mystery Novels of the East and the West) is a list published in the Japanese magazine Shūkan Bunshun (the Weekly Bunshun) in 1985 by Bungeishunjū. This list was also published in book form in 1986.

508 people who love mystery novels, including the 123 members of Mystery Writers of Japan, took part in the survey.

The revised edition came out in 2012.

== See also ==
- Kono Mystery ga Sugoi!
- Honkaku Mystery Best 10
- Japanese detective fiction
- The Top 100 Crime Novels of All Time
