= Kyotaro Nishimura =

Japanese novelist (1930–2022)

- 西村 京太郎
- Born: Kihachiro Yajima; 6 September 1930; Ebara, Tokyo, Japan
- Died: 3 March 2022 (aged 91); Yugawara, Kanagawa, Japan
- Occupation: Novelist
- Writing career
- Pen name: Kyotaro Nishimura

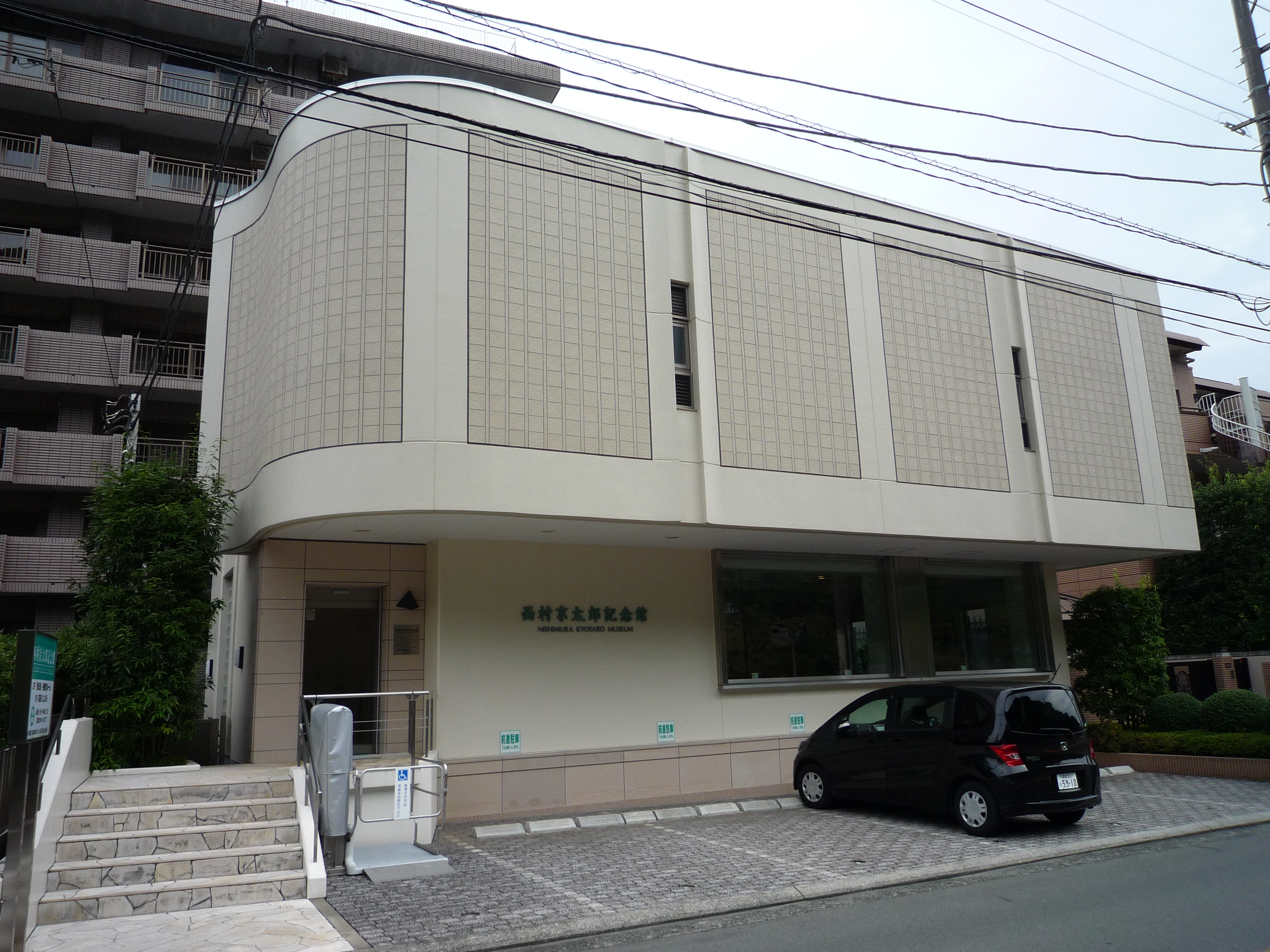
Nishimura Kyotaro Museum (permanently closed in 2024)

Kyotaro Nishimura (西村 京太郎, Nishimura Kyōtarō; 6 September 1930 – 3 March 2022) was a Japanese novelist in the police procedural genre.

== Career ==
Nishimura is best known for his "train series" mysteries, most of which feature his characters, police detectives Shozo Totsugawa, Sadao Kamei and Tokitaka Honda. He won the Mystery Writers of Japan Award in 1981 for The Terminal Murder Case.

Nishimura was married to Mizue Yajima. He died from liver cancer on 3 March 2022, at the age of 91.

== Works in English translation ==
Novel

- The Mystery Train Disappears (original title: Misuterī Ressha ga Kieta), trans. Gavin Frew (New York: Dembner Books, 1990) ISBN 0-942637-30-5

Short story collection

- The Isle of South Kamui and Other Stories (original title: Minami Kamuito), trans. Ginny Tapley Takemori (Thames River Press, 2013) ISBN 978-1-78308-011-3

Short story

- The Kindly Blackmailer (original title: Yasashii Kyōhakusha) ("Ellery Queen's Japanese Golden Dozen: The Detective Story World in Japan" anthology. Edited by Ellery Queen. Rutland Vermont: Charles E. Tuttle Co. Inc. 1978. ISBN 0-8048-1254-3 pp. 147–165)

== Awards ==
- 1965 – Edogawa Rampo Prize: Tenshi no Shōkon (A Scar of an Angel)
- 1981 – Mystery Writers of Japan Award for Best Novel: Tāminaru Satsujin Jiken (The Terminal Murder Case)

== TV ==
- Kyotaro Nishimura Travel Mystery
- Kyotaro Nishimura Suspense -Susumu Samonji
- Inspector Totsugawa Series
