= Honkaku Mystery Award =

Japanese literary award

The Honkaku Mystery Awards (本格ミステリ大賞, Honkaku Misuteri Taishō) are presented every year by the Honkaku Mystery Writers Club of Japan. They honor the best in honkaku (i.e. authentic, orthodox) mystery fiction and critical works published in the previous year.

== Honkaku Mystery Award for Best Fiction winners ==
	Year	Winner	Title	Available in English Translation
1	2001	Jun Kurachi (ja)	Kochu no Tengoku (壺中の天国)	
2	2002	Masaki Yamada	Misuteri Opera (ミステリ・オペラ)	
3	2003	Kiyoshi Kasai (ja)	Oidipusu Shokogun (オイディプス症候群)	
3	2003	Otsuichi	Gosu Risuto katto Jiken (GOTH リストカット事件)	Goth: A Novel of Horror
4	2004	Shogo Utano (ja)	Hazakura no Kisetsu ni Kimi o Omou to iu Koto (葉桜の季節に君を想うということ)	
5	2005	Rintaro Norizuki	Namakubi ni Kiitemiro (生首に聞いてみろ)	
6	2006	Keigo Higashino	Yōgisha X no Kenshin (容疑者Xの献身)	The Devotion of Suspect X
7	2007	Shusuke Michio (ja)	Shadou (シャドウ)	
8	2008	Alice Arisugawa	Joo koku no Shiro (女王国の城)	
9	2009	Masaki Tsuji	Kanzen Ren'ai (完全恋愛)	
10	2010	Shinzo Mitsuda (ja)	Mizuchi no gotoki Shizumu Mono (水魑の如き沈むもの)	
10	2010	Shogo Utano (ja)	Misshitsu Satsujin Gemu 2.0 (密室殺人ゲーム2.0)	
11	2011	Yutaka Maya (ja)	Sekigan no Shojo (隻眼の少女)	
12	2012	Kyo Shirodaira (ja)	Kyoko Suiri: Kojin Nanase (虚構推理 鋼人七瀬)	
12	2012	Hiroko Minagawa	Hirakasete Itadaki Koei desu (開かせていただき光栄です)	The Resurrection Fireplace
13	2013	Seiichiro Oyama (ja)	Misshitsu Shushuka (密室蒐集家)	
14	2014	Tomoki Morikawa (ja)	Suno Howaito [Snow White] (スノーホワイト)	
15	2015	Yutaka Maya (ja)	Sayonara Kamisama (さよなら神様)	
16	2016	Hiu Torikai (ja)	Shi to Sunadokei (死と砂時計)	
17	2017	Kenji Takemoto (ja)	Ruikō Meikyū (涙香迷宮)	
18	2018	Masahiro Imamura (ja)	Shijinsō no Satsujin (屍人荘の殺人)	Death Among the Undead
19	2019	Amon Ibuki (ja)	Katana to Kasa (刀と傘)	
20	2020	Sako Aizawa (ja)	Medium: Reibai Tantei Jozuka Hisui (medium 霊媒探偵城塚翡翠)	
21	2021	Tomoya Sakurada (ja)	Semi Kaeru (蟬かえる)	
22	2022	Taku Ashibe	Omarike Satsujin Jiken (大鞠家殺人事件)	Murder in the House of Omari
22	2022	Honobu Yonezawa	Kokurojo (黒牢城)	The Samurai and the Prisoner
23	2023	Tomoyuki Shirai (ja)	Meitantei no Ikenie: Jinmin Kyokai Satsujin Jiken (名探偵のいけにえ 人民教会殺人事件)	
24	2024	Yugo Aosaki（ja）	Jirai Glico（地雷グリコ）	
25	2025	Yu Itsuki (ja)	Kanojo ga Tantei de Nakereba（彼女が探偵でなければ）	

- Nominees available in English translation
  - 05 (2005) - Taku Ashibe, Murder in the Red Chamber (紅楼夢の殺人, Koromu no Satsujin)
  - 10 (2010) - Yukito Ayatsuji, Another (アナザー, Anazā)

== Honkaku Mystery Award for Best Critical Work winners ==
	Year	Winner	Title	Available in English Translation
1	2001	Manji Gonda (ja); Hirohisa Shimpo (ja)	Nihon Misuteri Jiten (日本ミステリー事典) (Dictionary of Japanese mystery writers)	
2	2002	Tadashi Wakashima (ja)	Ranshi Dokusha no Kikan (乱視読者の帰還) (Critical essay)	
3	2003	Kiyoshi Kasai (ja)	Tantei Shosetsu Ron Josetsu (探偵小説論序説) (Studies on Honkaku mystery)	
4	2004	Akiyuki Sengai (ja)	Minamo no Seiza Minasoko no Hoseki (水面の星座 水底の宝石) (Studies on honkaku mystery)	
5	2005	Hajime Amagi (ja)	AMAGI Hajime no Misshitsu Hanzaigaku Kyotei (天城一の密室犯罪学教程) (Theory and practice of Locked room mystery)	
6	2006	Kaoru Kitamura	The Japanese Nickel Mystery (ニッポン硬貨の謎, Nippon Koka no Nazo) (Pastiche of Ellery Queen)	
7	2007	Masaaki Tatsumi (ja)	Ronri no Kumo no Su no Naka de (論理の蜘蛛の巣の中で) (Studies on honkaku mystery)	
8	2008	Kentaro Komori (ja)	Tantei Shosetsu no Ronrigaku (探偵小説の論理学) (Studies on honkaku mystery)	
9	2009	Toshiaki Endo (ja)	Nazo no Kaizodo (「謎」の解像度) (Studies on honkaku mystery)	
10	2010	Motoi Taniguchi (ja)	Senzen Sengo Itan Bungaku Ron (戦前戦後異端文学論) (Studies on Japanese heterodox literature)	
11	2011	Yusan Iiki (ja)	Erari Kuin Ron (エラリー・クイーン論) (Studies on Ellery Queen)	
12	2012	Kiyoshi Kasai (ja)	Tantei Shosetsu to Jojutsu Torikku (探偵小説と叙述トリック) (Studies on mystery fiction)	
13	2013	Kenta Fukui (ja)	Honkaku Misuteri Kansho Jutsu (本格ミステリ鑑賞術) (Studies on honkaku mystery)	
14	2014	Ryuzo Uchida (ja)	Roja Akuroido wa Naze Korosareru? (ロジャー・アクロイドはなぜ殺される?) (lit. Why Is Roger Ackroyd Killed?)	
15	2015	Aoi Shimotsuki	Agasa Kurisuti Kanzen Koryaku (アガサ・クリスティー完全攻略) (lit. The Definitive Guide to Agatha Christie)	
16	2016	Shinobu Asagihara (ja)	Misuteri Dokusha no Tame no Renjō Mikihiko Zensakuhin Gaido: Zōhokaiteiban (ミステリ読者のための連城三紀彦全作品ガイド 増補改訂版) (lit. The Guide to Complete Works of Mikihiko Renjo for Mystery Readers: Enlarged and Revised)	
17	2017	Masahiko Kikuni (ja); Yuka Kuniki (ja)	Honkaku Ryoku: Hondana Tantei no Misuteri Bukku Gaido (本格力 本棚探偵のミステリ・ブックガイド) (lit. The Might of Honkaku: A Shelf Detective's Mystery Book Guide)	
18	2018	Yusan Iiki (ja)	Honkaku Musuteri Gesakuzanmai (本格ミステリ戯作三昧) (lit. Being Absorbed to Honkaku)	
19	2019	Shosaku Naka (ja)	Ranpo Nazotoki Kuronikuru (乱歩謎解きクロニクル) (lit. Ranpo Mystery Solving Chronicle)	
20	2020	Yasuo Nagayama (ja)	Modanizumu Misuteri no Jidai (モダニズム・ミステリの時代) (lit. The Era of Modernism Mystery)	
21	2021	Yusan Iiki (ja)	Sugakusha to Tetsugakusha no Misshitsu (数学者と哲学者の密室) (lit. The Locked Room of a Mathematician and a Philosopher)	
22	2022	Osamu Komori (ja)	Tanpen Misuteri no 200 Nen (短編ミステリの二百年)(Anthology of mystery stories)	
23	2023	Tatsumi Atsukawa (ja)	Atsukawa Tatsumi Dokusho Nikki (阿津川辰海 読書日記)(Reading Journal)	
24	2024	Masaki Kawade	Mystery Library Investigation Sengo Honyaku Mystey Sousho Tanbou（ミステリ・ライブラリ・インヴェスティゲーション 戦後翻訳ミステリ叢書探訪） (Studies on translated mystery fiction)	
25	2025	Rintaro Norizuki; Hirohisa Shimpo (ja)	Shitaiokiba de Machiawase Shimpo Hirohisa Norizuki Rintaro Ofukushokan（死体置場で待ち合わせ 新保博久・法月綸太郎 往復書簡） (Epistolary exchange)	

== Honkaku Mystery Award for Lifetime Achievement winners ==
The award is presented irregularly.

- 01 (2001) - Tetsuya Ayukawa (Honkaku mystery writer)
- 04 (2004) - Yasunobu Togawa (ja) (editor), Hideomi Uyama (ja) (editor)
- 08 (2008) - Fu Chin-chuan (Hiroshi Shimazaki) (ja) (editor)

== Best Translated Honkaku Mystery of the Decade ==
The Best Honkaku Mystery Novel translated into Japanese in the last decade.

Winners (in bold) and shortlisted titles.

=== 2000–2009 ===
Author	Title	Translator	Orig. Pub. Year	Region
**Jack Kerley**	**The Death Collectors**	**Kazuyo Misumi**	**2005**	USA
Sarah Caudwell	The Sibyl in Her Grave	Kazuyo Haneji	2000	ENG
Michael Connelly	Blood Work	Yoshimichi Furusawa (ja)	1998	USA
Thomas H. Cook	Instruments of Night	Kiyoshi Muramatsu (ja)	1998	USA
Jeffery Deaver	The Cold Moon	Makiko Ikeda (ja)	2006	USA
Minette Walters	The Shape of Snakes	Hiroko Narikawa	2000	ENG

=== 2010–2019 ===
Author	Title	Translator	Orig. Pub. Year	Region
**Anthony Horowitz**	**The Word Is Murder**	**Ran Yamada**	**2017**	ENG
Michel Bussi	Black Water Lilies	Atsushi Hiraoka (ja)	2011	FRA
Chan Ho-kei	The Borrowed	Kentaro Amano (ja)	2014	HKG
Frances Hardinge	The Lie Tree	Atsuko Kodama	2015	ENG
Kate Morton	The Secret Keeper	Junko Aoki (ja)	2012	AUS
Stuart Turton	The Seven Deaths of Evelyn Hardcastle	Kazuyo Misumi	2018	ENG

== See also ==
- Mystery Writers of Japan Award
- Japanese detective fiction
- Honkaku Mystery Best 10
