= Kurumi Inui =

Kurumi Inui (乾 くるみ, Inui Kurumi; born 1963) is a Japanese mystery writer. In 1998, his debut work J no shinwa won the 4th Mephisto Prize. He wrote Initiation Love.

== Biography ==
Inui was born in 1963, and is from Shizuoka Prefecture. He is a graduate of Shizuoka University, where he studied science and math.

== List of works ==
- J no shinwa
- Hako no naka
- Tō no danshō
- Marionette shōkōgun
- Hayashi shinkurō to itsutsu no nazo
- Initiation Love
- Repeat
