= Unno Jūza =

Japanese science-fiction writer

Unno Juza
- Born: Sano Shōichi; December 26, 1897; Tokushima, Japan
- Died: May 17, 1949 (aged 51); Setagaya, Japan
- Education: Waseda University
- Children: 3
- Writing career
- Period: 1928 - 1949
- Genre: Science fiction (notably Crime fiction)

Sano Shōichi (佐野 昌一, December 26, 1897 - May 17, 1949), known by his pen name Unno Jūza (海野 十三), was a Japanese novelist who was the founding father of Japanese science fiction.

== Biography ==
Unno was born on December 26, 1897, in Tokushima, Tokushima Prefecture, to a family of medical doctors. He studied at the Waseda University.

In 1928 he debuted as a writer with the novel The case of the mysterious death in the electric bath (Denkifuro no kaishijiken).

During the Pacific War he wrote a great number of science-fiction novels, remaining in Tokyo throughout the air raids. Japan's defeat in World War II was for him a hard blow, and Unno spent the last years in his life in a state of deep depression.

His scientific work was influenced by that of Nikola Tesla.

Unno died on May 17, 1949, aged 51.

== Legacy ==
Captain Jūzō Okita of Space Battleship Yamato was named as a tribute to Unno.

== Works ==
- Aru Uchū-jin no Himitsu (ある宇宙塵の秘密)
- Angō Onban Jiken (暗号音盤事件)
- Ikiteiru Chō (生きている腸)
- Uchū Joshū Dai Ichi-gō (宇宙女囚第一号)
- Uchū Sentai (宇宙戦隊)
- Uchū Senpei (宇宙尖兵)
- Uchū no Maigo (宇宙の迷子)
- Unno Jūza Haisen Nikki (海野十三敗戦日記)
- Ei Hondo Jōriku Sakusen no Zen'ya (英本土上陸作戦の前夜)
- Osoroshiki Tsuya (恐しき通夜)
- Gaikotsukan (骸骨館)
- Kaisei Gan (怪星ガン)
- Kaitei Toshi (海底都市)
- Kagi kara Nukedashita Onna (鍵から抜け出した女)
- Kaban Rashikunai Kaban (鞄らしくない鞄)
- Kayakusen (火薬船)
- Kifutsudō Jiken (鬼仏洞事件)
- Kyōryū-tei no Bōken (恐竜艇の冒険)
- Kyōryū-tō (恐竜島)
- Kinzoku Ningen (金属人間)
- Kūchū Hyōryū Isshūkan (空中漂流一週間)
- Gun'yōzame (軍用鮫)
- Kōun no Kuroko (幸運の黒子)
- Kokusai Satsujin-dan no Hōkai (国際殺人団の崩壊)
- Sankakkei no Kyōfu (三角形の恐怖)
- Sanju-nen Go no Sekai (三十年後の世界)
- Sannin no Sōseiji (三人の双生児)
- Jigoku Kaidō (地獄街道)
- Jūhachi-ji no Ongaku-yoku (十八時の音楽浴)
- Shōnen Tanteichō (少年探偵長)
- Jinzō Ningen Efu-shi (人造人間エフ氏)
- Sekigaisen Otoko (赤外線男)
- Sen-nen Go no Sekai (千年後の世界)
- Dai Uchū Enseitai (大宇宙遠征隊)
- Dai Go Hyōgaki (第五氷河期)
- Chikyū Yōsai (地球要塞)
- Chikyū wo Nerau Mono (地球を狙う者)
- Chichūma (地中魔)
- Chō-Ningen X-go (超人間X号)
- Tōmei Neko (透明猫)
- Tokkyo Tawan Ningen Hōshiki (特許多腕人間方式)
- 2000 nen Sensō (二、〇〇〇年戦争)
- Nō no Naka no Reijin (脳の中の麗人)
- Hitotsubokan (一坪館)
- Hyōgaki no Kaijin (氷河期の怪人)
- Fushigikoku Tanken (ふしぎ国探検)
- Fushū (俘囚)
- Hōsō Sareta Yuigon (放送された遺言)
- Maruamru Jū (○○獣)
- Miezaru Teki (見えざる敵)
- Yūsei Shokumin Setsu (遊星植民説)
- Yūrei-sen no Himitsu (幽霊船の秘密)
- Yohōshō Kokuji (予報省告示)
- Reikon Dai Jū-gō no Himitsu (霊魂第十号の秘密)
- Jinzō Ningen Satsugai Jiken (人造人間殺害事件)

=== Utei Tenku Series ===
Utei Tenku Series (烏啼天駆シリーズ):

- Kizoku wa Shiharau (奇賊は支払う)
- Shinzō Tōnan (心臓盗難)
- Kizoku Higan (奇賊悲願)
- Angō no Yakuwari (暗号の役割)
- Surikae Kaiga (すり替え怪画)

=== Under alias of Oka Kyūjūrō ===
- Yukima (雪魔)
- Chikyū Hakkyō Jiken (地球発狂事件)

=== English Translations ===
- Fast Forward Japan: Stories by the Founding Father of Japanese Science Fiction [includes: Eighteen O'Clock Music Bath (十八時の音楽浴), The Theory of Planetary Colonization, The World in One Thousand Years, Four-Dimensional Man, Mysterious Spatial Rift, The Living Intestine, Crematoria, The Last Broadcast, Adventures of the Dinosaur-Craft] (ISBN 978-1737318217)
- The Secret of the Cosmic Dust (ある宇宙塵の秘密). Translated by Till Weingärtner. The Irish Journal of Asian Studies Vol.7, 2021 (ISSN 2009-8448).
