= Kaoru Kitamura =

Japanese writer (born 1949)

- Born: December 28, 1949 (age 76); Sugito, Saitama, Japan
- Occupation: Writer
- Writing career
- Genre: Mystery

Kaoru Kitamura (北村 薫, Kitamura Kaoru) (born December 28, 1949) is the pen name of Kazuo Miyamoto (宮本 和男, Miyamoto Kazuo), a popular contemporary Japanese writer, mainly of short stories.

== Biography ==
Kitamura was born in the town of Sugito in Saitama Prefecture. He studied literature at Waseda University in Tokyo, and was a member of the Waseda Mystery Club while a student there. However, after graduating from Waseda in 1972, he returned to Saitama to become a language teacher at Kasukabe High School, his alma mater. He began his fiction writing career only after teaching for almost twenty years, and stopped teaching in 1993 to devote himself completely to writing once established as an author.

He made his writing debut using a pen name. Initially, because the unnamed first-person protagonist of his early works was a female college student, and the name Kaoru is gender ambiguous, it was widely speculated that Kitamura was female. This speculation persisted until he revealed his identity upon accepting the Mystery Writers of Japan Award in 1991.

== Works ==
Kitamura is known as a writer of mysteries, and rather than the detective and crime stories of traditional mystery, his work mainly focuses on the logical resolution of more "ordinary" puzzles and questions encountered in everyday life. He is considered a pioneer of this style of mystery in Japan, called "everyday mystery" (日常の謎, nichijō no nazo), which has since been taken up by many other writers.

He made his literary debut in 1989, with the publication of Soratobu Uma (空飛ぶ馬, "Flying Horse"), and has been writing prolifically since then. He won the 44th Mystery Writers of Japan Award in 1991 for Yoru no Semi (夜の蝉, "Night Locusts"), the 6th Honkaku Mystery Award in 2006 for Nippon Kōka no Nazo (ニッポン硬貨の謎, "Japanese Coin Mystery"), and the 2006 Baka-Misu Award for the same work. In 2009, after repeated previous nominations, he won the prestigious Naoki Prize (the 141st) for Sagi to Yuki (鷺と雪, "Herons and Snow"). His works have been adapted for film, television, and manga.

== Selected bibliography ==
Year	Japanese Title	Series
1989	Soratobu Uma (空飛ぶ馬, "Flying Horse")	Enshi-san (円紫さん) series
1990	Yoru no Semi (夜の蝉, "Night Locusts")	Enshi-san series
1991	Aki no Hana (秋の花, "Autumn Flowers")	Enshi-san series
1992	Roku no Miya no Himegimi (六の宮の姫君, "Princess in Rokunomiya")	Enshi-san series
1995	Skip (スキップ, Sukippu)	"Time and Man" (時と人, Toki to Hito) trilogy
1997	Turn (ターン, Tān)	"Time and Man" trilogy
1998	Asagiri (朝霧, "Morning Fog")	Enshi-san series
2001	Reset (リセット, Risetto)	"Time and Man" trilogy
2003	Michi no Hi (街の灯, "City Lights")	Becky-san (ベッキーさん, Bekkī-san) series
2005	Hari no Ten (玻璃の天, "Glass Heaven")	Becky-san series
2005	Nippon Kōka no Nazo (ニッポン硬貨の謎, "Japanese Coin Mystery")	
2009	Sagi to Yuki (鷺と雪, "Herons and Snow")	Becky-san series

== See also ==
- Honkaku Mystery Writers Club of Japan
