= Kono Mystery ga Sugoi! =

Annual mystery fiction guide book

- Editor: Kono Mystery ga Sugoi! Editorial Team
- Categories: Mystery fiction
- Frequency: Annually
- Publisher: Takarajimasha
- First issue: December 20, 1988
- Country: Japan
- Language: Japanese

Kono Mystery ga Sugoi! (このミステリーがすごい!, Kono Misuterī ga Sugoi!; lit. This Mystery is Excellent!) is an annual mystery fiction guide book published by Takarajimasha. The guide book publishes a list of the top ten mystery books published in Japan in the previous year.

== 1988 ==
Kono Mystery ga Sugoi! 1988 (JICC Shuppankyoku. December, 1988)

International
| Rank | Author | Title |
|---|---|---|
| 1 | Trevanian | The Main |
| 2 | Scott Turow | Presumed Innocent |
| 3 | P. D. James | A Taste for Death |
| 3 | Bob Langley | Traverse of the Gods |
| 5 | Andrew Vachss | Strega |
| 6 | Robert Littell | The Sisters |
| 7 | Michael Z. Lewin | Late Payments |
| 8 | William Diehl | Hooligans |
| 9 | Barbara Vine | A Dark-Adapted Eye |
| 10 | H. F. Saint | Memoirs of an Invisible Man |

Japanese
| Rank | Author | Title |
|---|---|---|
| 1 | Yoichi Funado | Densetsu Naki Chi (伝説なき地) |
| 2 | Ryo Hara (ja) | Soshite Yoru wa Yomigaeru (そして夜は甦る) |
| 3 | Mikihiko Renjo | Tasogare no Berurin (黄昏のベルリン) |
| 4 | Joh Sasaki | Berurin Hiko Shirei (ベルリン飛行指令); English translation: Zero Over Berlin |
| 5 | Soji Shimada | Iho no Kishi (異邦の騎士) |
| 6 | Futari Okajima (ja) | Soshite Tobira ga Tozasareta (そして扉が閉ざされた) |
| 7 | Yukito Ayatsuji | Meirokan no Satsujin (迷路館の殺人) |
| 8 | Rintaro Norizuki | Mippei Kyoshitsu (密閉教室) |
| 9 | Go Osaka | Samayoeru Nozui (さまよえる脳髄) |
| 9 | Yoshinaga Fujita | Daburu Suchiru (ダブル・スチール) |

== 1989 ==
Kono Mystery ga Sugoi! 1989 (JICC Shuppankyoku. January, 1990)

International
| Rank | Author | Title |
|---|---|---|
| 1 | Thomas Harris | The Silence of the Lambs |
| 2 | Stephen Hunter | The Day Before Midnight |
| 3 | Aaron Elkins | Old Bones |
| 4 | Elmore Leonard | Freaky Deaky |
| 4 | Michael Z. Lewin | Out of Season [UK title: Out of Time] |
| 6 | Nelson DeMille | Word of Honor |
| 7 | Craig Thomas | The Bear's Tears |
| 8 | Brian Freemantle | Charlie Muffin San [US title: See Charlie Run] |
| 9 | Leonard Wise | Doc's Legacy |
| 10 | Reginald Hill | Child's Play |
| 10 | Rick Boyer | The Daisy Ducks |

Japanese
| Rank | Author | Title |
|---|---|---|
| 1 | Ryo Hara | Watashi ga Koroshita Shojo (私が殺した少女) |
| 2 | Kaoru Kitamura | Soratobu Uma (空飛ぶ馬) |
| 3 | Soji Shimada | Kiso Ten o Ugokasu (奇想、天を動かす) |
| 4 | Joh Sasaki | Etorofu-hatsu Kinkyuden (エトロフ発緊急電) |
| 5 | Futari Okajima | Kurain no Tsubo (クラインの壺) |
| 6 | Ikki Kazama (ja) | Otoko-tachi wa Kita e (男たちは北へ) |
| 6 | Tatsuo Shimizu (ja) | Shin'ya Futatabi (深夜ふたたび) |
| 8 | Masaya Yamaguchi (ja) | Ikeru Shikabane no Shi (生ける屍の死) |
| 9 | Keiichiro Ryu | Kagemusha TOKUGAWA Ieyasu (影武者徳川家康) |
| 10 | Ichi Orihara (ja) | Tosaku no Rondo (倒錯のロンド) |

== 1991 ==
Kono Mystery ga Sugoi! 1991 (JICC Shuppankyoku. January, 1991)

International
| Rank | Author | Title |
|---|---|---|
| 1 | Umberto Eco | The Name of the Rose |
| 2 | Andrew Vachss | Blue Belle |
| 3 | James Ellroy | The Black Dahlia |
| 4 | Stephen King | Misery |
| 5 | Christianna Brand | Buffet for Unwelcome Guests |
| 6 | Ken Grimwood | Replay |
| 7 | Wilbur Smith | The Eye of the Tiger |
| 8 | Michael Z. Lewin | And Baby Will Fall |
| 9 | Patricia Highsmith | Eleven |
| 10 | William Diehl | Thai Horse |

Japanese
| Rank | Author | Title |
|---|---|---|
| 1 | Arimasa Osawa | Shinjuku-zame (新宿鮫); English translation: Shinjuku Shark |
| 2 | Kaoru Kitamura | Yoru no Semi (夜の蟬) |
| 3 | Yoichi Funado | Hono Nagareru Kanata (炎 流れる彼方) |
| 4 | Koshu Tani | Harukanari Kamigami no ZA (遥かなり神々の座) |
| 5 | Ryo Hara | Tenshi-tachi no Tantei (天使たちの探偵) |
| 6 | Tatsuo Shimizu | Kaerinan Iza (帰りなん、いざ) |
| 7 | Yukito Ayatsuji | Kirigoetei Satsujin Jiken (霧越邸殺人事件) |
| 8 | Yoshinaga Fujita | Kaerazaru Sahara (還らざるサハラ) |
| 9 | Miyuki Miyabe | Majutsu wa Sasayaku (魔術はささやく); English translation: The Devil's Whisper |
| 10 | Soji Shimada | Kurayamizaka Hitokui no Ki (暗闇坂の人喰いの木) |

== 1992 ==
Kono Mystery ga Sugoi! 1992 (JICC Shuppankyoku. January, 1992)

International
| Rank | Author | Title |
|---|---|---|
| 1 | P. D. James | Devices and Desires |
| 2 | Thomas H. Cook | Flesh and Blood |
| 3 | Shirley Conran | Savages |
| 4 | Patricia Highsmith | The Cry of the Owl |
| 5 | Keith Peterson | There Fell A Shadow |
| 6 | Michael Crichton | Jurassic Park |
| 7 | Bernard Cornwell | Sea Lord [US title:Killer's Wake] |
| 7 | Jim Thompson | The Killer Inside Me |
| 9 | Robert R. McCammon | Stinger |
| 10 | George C. Chesbro | Bone |

Japanese
| Rank | Author | Title |
|---|---|---|
| 1 | Tatsuo Shimizu | Yukizuri no Machi (行きずりの街) |
| 2 | Arimasa Osawa | Doku-zaru Shinjuku-zame II (毒猿 新宿鮫II); English translation: The Poison Ape |
| 3 | Itsura Inami (ja) | Dakku Koru (ダック・コール) |
| 4 | Miyuki Miyabe | Ryu wa Nemuru (龍は眠る); English translation: The Sleeping Dragon |
| 5 | Soji Shimada | Suisho no Piramiddo (水晶のピラミッド) |
| 6 | Nanami Wakatake (ja) | Boku no Misuterina Nichijo (ぼくのミステリな日常) |
| 7 | Go Osaka | Shaei Harukana Kuni (斜影はるかな国) |
| 8 | Kaoru Takamura (ja) | Kami no Hi (神の火) |
| 9 | Kaoru Takamura | Ogon o Daite Tobe (黄金を抱いて翔べ) |
| 10 | Kenji Takemoto (ja) | Uroborosu no Gisho (ウロボロスの偽書) |

== 1993 ==
Kono Mystery ga Sugoi! 1993 (JICC Shuppankyoku. January, 1993)

International
| Rank | Author | Title |
|---|---|---|
| 1 | Reginald Hill | Bones and Silence |
| 2 | Lawrence Block | A Ticket to the Boneyard |
| 3 | Thomas H. Cook | Streets of Fire |
| 4 | Stephen King | It |
| 5 | Ross Thomas | Twilight at Mac's Place |
| 6 | Philip Kerr | March Violets |
| 7 | Nelson DeMille | The Gold Coast |
| 8 | David Martin | Lie to Me |
| 9 | John Grisham | The Firm |
| 10 | Robert Reeves | Peeping Thomas |

Japanese
| Rank | Author | Title |
|---|---|---|
| 1 | Yoichi Funado | Suna no Kuronikuru (砂のクロニクル) |
| 2 | Miyuki Miyabe | Kasha (火車); English translation: All She Was Worth |
| 3 | Kiyoshi Kasai (ja) | Tetsugakusha no Misshitsu (哲学者の密室) |
| 4 | Mangetsu Hanamura (ja) | Burusu (ブルース) |
| 5 | Kaoru Takamura | Riviera o Ute (リヴィエラを撃て) |
| 6 | Alice Arisugawa | Soto no Akuma (双頭の悪魔) |
| 6 | Yumehito Inoue (ja) | Dareka ga Naka ni Iru... (ダレカガナカニイル…) |
| 8 | Masaya Yamaguchi | Kiddo Pisutoruzu no Botoku (キッド・ピストルズの冒瀆) |
| 9 | Hosei Hahakigi (ja) | Mitabi no Kaikyo (三たびの海峡) |
| 10 | Kaoru Takamura | Waga Te ni Kenju o (わが手に拳銃を) |

== 1994 ==
Kono Mystery ga Sugoi! 1994 (Takarajimasha. December, 1993)

International
| Rank | Author | Title |
|---|---|---|
| 1 | Mitchell Smith | Stone City |
| 2 | Scott Turow | The Burden of Proof |
| 3 | Stephen Greenleaf | Book Case |
| 4 | Dean Koontz | Watchers |
| 5 | Colin Dexter | The Way Through the Woods |
| 6 | Lawrence Block | A Dance at the Slaughterhouse |
| 7 | Keith Peterson | Rough Justice |
| 8 | Michael Innes | Lament for a Maker |
| 9 | David Lorne | Sight Unseen |
| 10 | Peter Lovesey | The Last Detective |

Japanese
| Rank | Author | Title |
|---|---|---|
| 1 | Kaoru Takamura | Makusu no Yama (マークスの山) |
| 2 | Masaya Yamaguchi | Kiddo Pisutoruzu no Moso (キッド・ピストルズの妄想) |
| 3 | Itsura Inami | Sento Meri no Ribon (セント・メリーのリボン) |
| 4 | Arimasa Osawa | Bi Di Ti Okite no Machi (B・D・T 掟の街) |
| 5 | Ramo Nakajima | Gadara no Buta (ガダラの豚) |
| 6 | Tomoko Kano (ja) | Maho Hiko (魔法飛行) |
| 6 | Kaoru Kitamura | Fuyu no Opera (冬のオペラ) |
| 8 | Go Osaka | Maboroshi no Saiten (幻の祭典) |
| 9 | Ichi Orihara | Ijin-tachi no Yakata (異人たちの館) |
| 10 | Yuichi Shimpo (ja) | Shingen (震源) |

== 1995 ==
Kono Mystery ga Sugoi! 1995 (Takarajimasha. December, 1994)

International
| Rank | Author | Title |
|---|---|---|
| 1 | Scott Smith | A Simple Plan |
| 2 | Don Winslow | A Cool Breeze on the Underground |
| 3 | Donald E. Westlake | Dancing Aztecs |
| 4 | R. D. Wingfield | Frost at Christmas |
| 5 | Nelson DeMille | The General's Daughter |
| 6 | Andrew Vachss | Shella |
| 7 | Minette Walters | The Ice House |
| 8 | Stuart Woods | Grass Roots |
| 9 | Michael Connelly | The Black Ice |
| 10 | Akif Pirinçci | Felidae |
| 10 | Liza Cody | Bucket Nut |

Japanese
| Rank | Author | Title |
|---|---|---|
| 1 | Masaya Yamaguchi | Misuterizu (ミステリーズ) |
| 2 | Joh Sasaki | Sutokkuhorumu no Misshi (ストックホルムの密使) |
| 3 | Kaoru Takamura | Teri-gaki (照柿) |
| 4 | Mangetsu Hanamura | Warau Yamazaki (笑う山崎) |
| 5 | Itsura Inami | Ryoken Tantei (猟犬探偵) |
| 5 | Itsura Inami | Otoko wa Hata (男は旗) |
| 7 | Jiro Asada | Purizun Hoteru Aki (プリズンホテル 秋) |
| 7 | Natsuhiko Kyogoku | Ubume no Natsu (姑獲鳥の夏); English translation: The Summer of the Ubume |
| 9 | Toru Shirakawa (ja) | Ryusei-tachi no Utage (流星たちの宴) |
| 10 | Rintaro Norizuki | Ni no Higeki (二の悲劇) |

== 1996 ==
Kono Mystery ga Sugoi! 1996 (Takarajimasha. December, 1995)

International
| Rank | Author | Title |
|---|---|---|
| 1 | Minette Walters | The Sculptress |
| 2 | Robert R. McCammon | Boy's Life |
| 3 | Lawrence Block | The Devil Knows You're Dead |
| 4 | Michael Connelly | The Concrete Blonde |
| 5 | Anthony Berkeley Cox | The Second Shot |
| 6 | Scott Turow | Pleading Guilty |
| 7 | John Gardner | Maestro |
| 8 | Dan Simmons | Carrion Comfort |
| 9 | Patrick Ruell | The Only Game |
| 10 | Jean Vautrin | Billy-Ze-Kick |

Japanese
| Rank | Author | Title |
|---|---|---|
| 1 | Yuichi Shimpo | Howaito Auto (ホワイトアウト) (Whiteout (2000 film)) |
| 2 | Yoshinaga Fujita | Kotetsu no Kishi (鋼鉄の騎士) |
| 3 | Yoichi Funado | Ezochi Bekken (蝦夷地別件) |
| 4 | Natsuhiko Kyogoku | Mōryō no Hako (魍魎の匣) |
| 5 | Ryo Hara | Saraba Nagaki Nemuri (さらば長き眠り) |
| 6 | Iori Fujiwara (ja) | Terorisuto no Parasoru (テロリストのパラソル) |
| 7 | Kaoru Kitamura | Sukippu (スキップ) |
| 8 | Katsufumi Umehara (ja) | Soriton no Akuma (ソリトンの悪魔) |
| 9 | Natsuhiko Kyogoku | Kyokotsu no Yume (狂骨の夢) |
| 10 | Hideaki Sena | Parasaito Ivu (パラサイト・イヴ); English translation: Parasite Eve |
| 10 | Arimasa Osawa | Tenshi no Kiba (天使の牙) |

== 1997 ==
Kono Mystery ga Sugoi! 1997 (Takarajimasha. December, 1996)

International
| Rank | Author | Title |
|---|---|---|
| 1 | John Dunning | Booked to Die |
| 2 | James Ellroy | White Jazz |
| 3 | Peter Lovesey | The Summons |
| 4 | Dick Francis | Come To Grief |
| 5 | James Crumley | The Mexican Tree Duck |
| 6 | Joe R. Lansdale | Two-Bear Mambo |
| 7 | Michael Connelly | The Last Coyote |
| 8 | P. D. James | Original Sin |
| 9 | Lorenzo Carcaterra | Sleepers |
| 10 | John le Carré | Our Game |

Japanese
| Rank | Author | Title |
|---|---|---|
| 1 | Seishu Hase | Fuyajo (不夜城) |
| 2 | Yuichi Shimpo | Dasshu (奪取) |
| 3 | Keigo Higashino | Meitantei no Okite (名探偵の掟) |
| 4 | Miyuki Miyabe | Gamotei Jiken (蒲生邸事件) |
| 5 | Toru Shirakawa | Umi wa Kawaiteita (海は涸いていた) |
| 6 | Jiro Asada | Sokyu no Subaru (蒼穹の昴) |
| 7 | Natsuhiko Kyogoku | Tesso no Ori (鉄鼠の檻) |
| 8 | Arata Tendo (ja) | Kazokugari (家族狩り) |
| 9 | Arimasa Osawa | Yukihotaru (雪蛍) |
| 10 | Yasuhiko Nishizawa (ja) | Jinkaku Ten'i no Satsujin (人格転移の殺人) |

== 1998 ==
Kono Mystery ga Sugoi! 1998 (Takarajimasha. December, 1997)

International
| Rank | Author | Title |
|---|---|---|
| 1 | R. D. Wingfield | A Touch of Frost |
| 2 | Joel Townsley Rogers | The Red Right Hand |
| 3 | Stephen King | The Green Mile |
| 4 | Minette Walters | The Scold's Bridle |
| 5 | Jeffery Deaver | A Maiden's Grave |
| 6 | Robert Goddard | Into the Blue |
| 6 | Thomas Sigismund Stribling | Clues of the Caribbees |
| 8 | Stephen Hunter | Dirty White Boys |
| 9 | Donald E. Westlake | Good Behavior |
| 10 | John Dunning | The Bookman's Wake |

Japanese
| Rank | Author | Title |
|---|---|---|
| 1 | Natsuo Kirino | Auto (アウト); English translation: Out |
| 2 | Yusuke Kishi | Kuroi Ie (黒い家) (Black House (film)) |
| 3 | Hiroko Minagawa | Shi no Izumi (死の泉) |
| 4 | Natsuhiko Kyogoku | Jorogumo no Kotowari (絡新婦の理) |
| 5 | Seishu Hase | Rekuiemu Fuyajo II (鎮魂歌 不夜城II) |
| 6 | Baku Yumemakura | Kamigami no Itadaki (神々の山嶺) |
| 7 | Natsuhiko Kyogoku | Warau Iemon (嗤う伊右衛門) |
| 8 | Hosei Hahakigi | Tobo (逃亡) |
| 9 | Riku Onda (ja) | Sangatsu wa Fukaki Kurenai no Fuchi o (三月は深き紅の淵を) |
| 10 | Arimasa Osawa | Kori-mai Shinjuku-zame VI (氷舞 新宿鮫VI) |

== 1999 ==
Kono Mystery ga Sugoi! 1999 (Takarajimasha. December, 1998)

International
| Rank | Author | Title |
|---|---|---|
| 1 | Theodore Roszak | Flicker |
| 2 | Thomas H. Cook | The Chatham School Affair |
| 3 | Stephen Hunter | Black Light |
| 4 | Elizabeth Ferrars | Don't Monkey with Murder |
| 5 | Charles Palliser | The Quincunx |
| 6 | Ian Rankin | Black and Blue |
| 7 | Helen McCloy | She Walks Alone |
| 8 | Douglas Kennedy | Big Picture |
| 8 | Robert Goddard | Painting the Darkness |
| 10 | Dennis Lehman | The Getbacks of Mother Superior |
| 10 | James Ellroy | American Tabloid |

Japanese
| Rank | Author | Title |
|---|---|---|
| 1 | Kaoru Takamura | Redi Joka (レディ・ジョーカー) (Lady Joker) |
| 2 | Go Osaka | Moeru Chi no Hate ni (燃える地の果てに) |
| 3 | Miyuki Miyabe | Riyu (理由) |
| 4 | Fuyumi Ono | Shiki |
| 5 | Yusuke Kishi | Tenshi no Saezuri (天使の囀り) |
| 6 | Ryoichi Kano (ja) | Maboroshi no Onna (幻の女) |
| 7 | Hikaru Okuizumi | Gurando Misuteri (グランド・ミステリー) |
| 8 | Toichiro Kujira (ja) | Yamataikoku wa dokodesuka? (邪馬台国はどこですか?) |
| 9 | Keigo Higashino | Himitsu (秘密); English translation: Naoko |
| 9 | Reito Nikaido (ja) | Jinro-jo no Kyofu IV (人狼城の恐怖 IV) |

== 2000 ==
Kono Mystery ga Sugoi! 2000 (Takarajimasha. December, 1999)

International
| Rank | Author | Title |
|---|---|---|
| 1 | Stephen Hunter | Point of Impact |
| 2 | Jeffery Deaver | The Bone Collector |
| 3 | Thomas H. Cook | Breakheart Hill |
| 4 | Leo Bruce | Case for Three Detectives |
| 5 | Richard Stark | Comeback |
| 6 | Carol O'Connell | Judas Child |
| 7 | Thomas H. Cook | Mortal Memory |
| 8 | John le Carré | The Tailor of Panama |
| 9 | Ian Rankin | Let it Bleed |
| 9 | Thomas Sigismund Stribling | Best Dr. Poggioli Detective Stories |

Japanese
| Rank | Author | Title |
|---|---|---|
| 1 | Arata Tendo | Eien no Ko (永遠の仔) |
| 2 | Keigo Higashino | Byakuyako (白夜行); English translation: Journey Under the Midnight Sun |
| 3 | Harutoshi Fukui (ja) | Bokoku no Ijisu (亡国のイージス) |
| 4 | Koushun Takami | Batoru Rowaiaru (バトル・ロワイアル); English translation: Battle Royale |
| 5 | Natsuo Kirino | Yawarakana Hoho (柔らかな頬) |
| 6 | Yuichi Shimpo | Boda Rain (ボーダーライン) |
| 7 | Hideo Okuda (ja) | Saiaku (最悪) |
| 8 | Kaoru Kitamura | Banjo no Teki (盤上の敵) |
| 9 | Masayuki Shuno (ja) | Hasami Otoko (ハサミ男) |
| 10 | Takayoshi Honda (ja) | Misshingu (MISSING) |

== 2001 ==
Kono Mystery ga Sugoi! 2001 (Takarajimasha. December, 2000)

International
| Rank | Author | Title |
|---|---|---|
| 1 | Jim Thompson | Pop. 1280 |
| 2 | Seamus Smyth | Quinn |
| 3 | Thomas Harris | Hannibal |
| 4 | Scott Turow | Personal Injuries |
| 5 | Lawrence Norfolk | Lemprière's Dictionary |
| 6 | Michael Connelly | Blood Work |
| 7 | Thomas H. Cook | Instruments of Night |
| 8 | Dennis Lehane | Darkness, Take My Hand |
| 9 | Richard North Patterson | Eyes of a Child |
| 10 | Jeffery Deaver | The Coffin Dancer |

Japanese
| Rank | Author | Title |
|---|---|---|
| 1 | Tsumao Awasaka (ja) | Kijutsu Tantei SOGA Kajo Zenshu (奇術探偵曾我佳城全集) |
| 2 | Hideo Yokoyama | Motive (EQMM May 2008) and other stories |
| 3 | Go Osaka | Hagetaka no Yoru (禿鷹の夜) |
| 4 | Yumehito Inoue | Orufakutoguramu (オルファクトグラム) |
| 5 | Kazuichi Iijima (ja) | Sisocho-ki (始祖鳥記) |
| 6 | Riku Onda | Zo to Miminari (象と耳鳴り) |
| 6 | Yoichi Funado | Niji no Tani no Gogatsu (虹の谷の五月); English translation: May in the Valley of the Rainbow |
| 8 | Yasuhiko Nishizawa | Ison (依存) |
| 9 | Toshiyuki Tajima (ja) | Shorei Ei (症例A) |
| 10 | Harutoshi Fukui | Kawa no Fukasa wa (川の深さは) |

== 2002 ==
Kono Mystery ga Sugoi! 2002 (Takarajimasha. December, 2001)

International
| Rank | Author | Title |
|---|---|---|
| 1 | Boston Teran | God is a Bullet |
| 2 | R. D. Wingfield | Night Frost |
| 2 | James Ellroy | The Cold Six Thousand |
| 4 | Donald E. Westlake | The Ax |
| 5 | Thomas H. Cook | Places in the Dark |
| 6 | Anthony Berkeley Cox | Jumping Jenny [US title: Dead Mrs. Stratton] |
| 7 | Jill McGown | The Stalking Horse |
| 8 | Stephen King | The Stand |
| 9 | Dorothy L. Sayers | Gaudy Night |
| 10 | Dennis Lehane | Mystic River |

Japanese
| Rank | Author | Title |
|---|---|---|
| 1 | Miyuki Miyabe | Mohohan (模倣犯); English translation: Puppet Master |
| 2 | Hideo Okuda | Jama (邪魔) |
| 3 | Masaki Yamada | Misuteri Opera (ミステリ・オペラ) |
| 4 | Ryuichi Kasumi (ja) | Sutimutaiga no Shiso (スティームタイガーの死走) |
| 5 | Keigo Higashino | Cho Satsujin Jiken (超・殺人事件) |
| 6 | Arimasa Osawa | Yamisaki Annainin (闇先案内人) |
| 7 | Futaro Yamada | Tengumisaki Satsujin Jiken (天狗岬殺人事件) |
| 8 | Kazuaki Takano | Jusan Kaidan (13階段) |
| 8 | Otaro Maijo | Kemuri ka Tsuchi ka Kuimono (煙か土か食い物) |
| 10 | Go Osaka | Aibo ni Ki o Tsukero (相棒に気をつけろ) |

== 2003 ==
Kono Mystery ga Sugoi! 2003 (Takarajimasha. December, 2002)

International
| Rank | Author | Title |
|---|---|---|
| 1 | Jeremy Dronfield | The Locust Farm |
| 2 | T. Jefferson Parker | Silent Joe |
| 3 | Seamus Smyth | Red Dock |
| 4 | Paul Halter | The Fourth Door |
| 5 | Jim Thompson | A Hell of a Woman |
| 6 | Gerald Kersh | The Oxoxoco Bottle and other stories |
| 7 | Eric Garcia | Anonymous Rex |
| 8 | Anthony Berkeley Cox | The Layton Court Mystery |
| 9 | Jean Vautrin | Groom |
| 10 | Michael Slade | Ripper |

Japanese
| Rank | Author | Title |
|---|---|---|
| 1 | Hideo Yokoyama | Han'ochi (半落ち) (Half a Confession) |
| 2 | Otsuichi | Gosu Risutokatto Jiken (GOTH リストカット事件); English translation: Goth: A Novel of Horror |
| 3 | Masaya Yamaguchi | Kigu (奇偶) |
| 4 | Arimasa Osawa | Suna no Karyudo (砂の狩人) |
| 5 | Bunzo Uchiumi (ja) | Harubin Kafe (ハルビン・カフェ) |
| 6 | Yuri Mitsuhara (ja) | Eighteenth Summer (EQMM December 2004) and other stories |
| 7 | Mikihiko Renjo | Ningen Dobutsuen (人間動物園) |
| 8 | Hitoshi Karasawa | Rondo (ロンド) |
| 9 | Taku Ashibe | Guran Ginyoru Jo (グラン・ギニョール城) |
| 10 | Kiyoshi Kasai | Oidipusu Shokogun (オイディプス症候群) |

== 2004 ==
Kono Mystery ga Sugoi! 2004 (Takarajimasha. December, 2003)

International
| Rank | Author | Title |
|---|---|---|
| 1 | Sarah Waters | Affinity |
| 2 | Michael Gilbert | Death in Captivity [US title: The Danger Within] |
| 3 | Robert R. McCammon | Speaks the Nightbird |
| 4 | Richard North Patterson | Silent Witness |
| 5 | Donald E. Westlake | The Hook |
| 6 | Joe R. Lansdale | A Fine Dark Line |
| 7 | William Landay | Mission Flats |
| 8 | Helen McCloy | The Singing Diamonds and Other Stories |
| 9 | Theodore Sturgeon | The Man Who Lost the Sea and other stories |
| 10 | Percival Wilde | P. Moran, Operative |

Japanese
| Rank | Author | Title |
|---|---|---|
| 1 | Shogo Utano (ja) | Hazakura no Kisetsu ni Kimi o Omou to iu Koto (葉桜の季節に君を想うということ) |
| 2 | Harutoshi Fukui | Shusen no Rorerai (終戦のローレライ) |
| 3 | Kotaro Isaka | Juryoku Piero (重力ピエロ) |
| 4 | Hideo Yokoyama | Daisan no Jiko (第三の時効) |
| 5 | Natsuo Kirino | Gurotesuku (グロテスク); English translation: Grotesque |
| 6 | Kotaro Isaka | Yokina Gyangu ga Chikyu o Mawasu (陽気なギャングが地球を回す) (A Cheerful Gang Turns the Earth) |
| 7 | Hideo Yokoyama | Kuraimazu Hai (クライマーズ・ハイ; Climber's High); English translation: Seventeen |
| 8 | Asami Ishimochi | Tsuki no Tobira (月の扉) |
| 9 | Mikihiko Renjo | Nagareboshi to Asonda koro (流れ星と遊んだころ) |
| 10 | Ryosuke Kakine | Wairudo Souru (ワイルド・ソウル) |

== 2005 ==
Kono Mystery ga Sugoi! 2005 (Takarajimasha. December, 2004)

International
| Rank | Author | Title |
|---|---|---|
| 1 | Sarah Waters | Fingersmith |
| 2 | Jeffery Deaver | The Vanished Man |
| 3 | Trevanian | Incident at Twenty-Mile |
| 4 | Dan Brown | The Da Vinci Code |
| 4 | James Crumley | The Final Country |
| 6 | A. H. Z. Carr | The Trial of John Nobody and other stories |
| 7 | Richard North Patterson | Dark Lady |
| 8 | Minette Walters | The Shape of Snakes |
| 9 | Connie Willis | To Say Nothing of the Dog |
| 10 | Christopher Priest | The Prestige |

Japanese
| Rank | Author | Title |
|---|---|---|
| 1 | Rintaro Norizuki | Namakubi ni Kiitemiro (生首に聞いてみろ) |
| 2 | Kotaro Isaka | Ahiru to Kamo no Koinrokka (アヒルと鴨のコインロッカー) |
| 3 | Hajime Amagi (ja) | AMAGI Hajime no Misshitsu Hanzaigaku Kyotei (天城一の密室犯罪学教程) |
| 4 | Toshihiko Yahagi (ja) | Rongu Guddobai (THE WRONG GOODBYE) |
| 5 | Jun Saito (ja) | Ginrin no Hasha (銀輪の覇者) |
| 6 | Yusuke Kishi | Garasu no Hamma (硝子のハンマー) |
| 7 | Yukito Ayatsuji | Ankokukan no Satsujin (暗黒館の殺人) |
| 8 | Shusuke Shizukui (ja) | Hannin ni Tsugu (犯人に告ぐ) |
| 9 | Hideo Yokoyama | Rinjo (臨場) |
| 10 | Taku Ashibe | Koromu no Satsujin (紅楼夢の殺人); English translation: Murder in the Red Chamber |

== 2006 ==
Kono Mystery ga Sugoi! 2006 (Takarajimasha. December, 2005)

International
| Rank | Author | Title |
|---|---|---|
| 1 | Jack Ritchie | The Crime Machine and other stories |
| 2 | Michael Connelly | Lost Light |
| 3 | James Carlos Blake | A World of Thieves |
| 4 | Theodore Sturgeon | Bright Segment and other stories |
| 5 | Jeffery Deaver | Garden of Beasts |
| 6 | Jack Kerley | The Hundredth Man |
| 6 | T. Jefferson Parker | California Girl |
| 8 | Michael Innes | Stop Press (aka. The Spider Strikes) |
| 9 | P. G. Wodehouse | (Jeeves series) |
| 10 | Stanley Ellin | The Last Bottle in the World and other stories |

Japanese
| Rank | Author | Title |
|---|---|---|
| 1 | Keigo Higashino | Yogisha X no Kenshin (容疑者Xの献身); English translation: The Devotion of Suspect X |
| 2 | Asami Ishimochi | Tobira wa Tozasareta mama (扉は閉ざされたまま) |
| 3 | Hideo Yokoyama | Shindo Zero (震度0) |
| 4 | Ryo hara | Orokamono Shisubeshi (愚か者死すべし) |
| 5 | Yutaka Maya (ja) | Kamisama Gemu (神様ゲーム) |
| 6 | Iori Fujiwara | Shiriusu no Michi (シリウスの道) |
| 7 | Hideo Furukawa (ja) | Beruka, Hoenai no ka? (ベルカ、吠えないのか?); English translation: Belka, Why Don't You Bark? |
| 8 | Honobu Yonezawa | Inu wa Dokoda (犬はどこだ) |
| 8 | Hajime Amagi | Shimazaki Keibu no Aribai Jikenbo (島崎警部のアリバイ事件簿) |
| 10 | Joh Sasaki | Warau Keikan (笑う警官) |
| 10 | Yuri Mitsuhara | Saigo no Negai (最後の願い) |

== 2007 ==
Kono Mystery ga Sugoi! 2007 (Takarajimasha. December, 2006)

International
| Rank | Author | Title |
|---|---|---|
| 1 | Laurie Lynn Drummond | Anything You Say Can and Will be Used Against You |
| 2 | Jeffery Deaver | Twisted |
| 2 | James Carlos Blake | Under the Skin |
| 4 | Carlos Ruiz Zafón | The Shadow of the Wind |
| 5 | Adam Fawer | Improbable |
| 6 | Jeffery Deaver | The Twelfth Card |
| 7 | Richard Matheson | Now You See It... |
| 7 | Michael Connelly | The Narrows |
| 9 | David Alexander | Hangman's Dozen |
| 10 | Kazuo Ishiguro | Never Let Me Go |

Japanese
| Rank | Author | Title |
|---|---|---|
| 1 | Yumeaki Hirayama (ja) | Dokuhakusuru Yunibasaru Yoko Merukatoru (独白するユニバーサル横メルカトル) |
| 2 | Joh Sasaki | Seifuku Sosa (制服捜査) |
| 3 | Shusuke Michio (ja) | Shadou (シャドウ) |
| 4 | Arimasa Osawa | Okami-bana Shinjuku-zame IX (狼花 新宿鮫IX) |
| 5 | Otsuichi | Ju to Chokoreto (銃とチョコレート) |
| 6 | Miyuki Miyabe | Na mo Naki Doku (名もなき毒) |
| 7 | Ryoichi Kano | Nie no Yakai (贄の夜会) |
| 8 | Rintaro Norizuki | Kairo Gurifin, Zettai Zetsumei (怪盗グリフィン、絶体絶命) |
| 9 | Keigo Higashino | Akai Yubi (赤い指) |
| 10 | Honobu Yonezawa | Kaki Gentei Toropikaru Pafe Jiken (夏期限定トロピカルパフェ事件) |
| 10 | Keisuke Tatekura | Deddo Rain (デッドライン) |

== 2008 ==
Kono Mystery ga Sugoi! 2008 (Takarajimasha. December, 2007)

International
| Rank | Author | Title |
|---|---|---|
| 1 | Jeffery Deaver | The Cold Moon |
| 2 | Carl Hiaasen | Skinny Dip |
| 3 | David Peace | Tokyo Year Zero |
| 4 | Robert Twohy | The Man Who Could Only Write Things and other stories |
| 5 | D. M. Devine | Devil at Your Elbow |
| 6 | Joe Gores | Cases |
| 7 | Paul Halter | La Chambre du Fou (The Madman's Room) |
| 7 | Jack Kerley | The Death Collectors |
| 9 | William Brittain | The Man Who Read John Dickson Carr and other stories |
| 9 | Henning Mankell | Sidetracked |

Japanese
| Rank | Author | Title |
|---|---|---|
| 1 | Joh Sasaki | Keikan no Chi (警官の血) |
| 2 | Kazuki Sakuraba | Akakuchibake no Densetsu (赤朽葉家の伝説); English translation: Red Girls: The Legend of the Akakuchibas |
| 3 | Alice Arisugawa | Jookoku no Shiro (女王国の城) |
| 4 | Bin Konno (ja) | Kadan Impei Sosa 2 (果断 隠蔽捜査2) |
| 5 | Shinzo Mitsuda (ja) | Kubinashi no gotoki Tataru Mono (首無の如き祟るもの) |
| 6 | Haruo Yamazawa (ja) | Hanareta Ie (離れた家) |
| 7 | Fumie Kondo (ja) | Sakurifaisu (サクリファイス) |
| 8 | Miyuki Miyabe | Rakuen (楽園) |
| 9 | Ryuichi Kasumi | Yuhi wa Kaeru (夕陽はかえる) |
| 10 | Ko Kojo (ja) | Ekkusu-bashi Fukin (X橋付近) |
| 10 | Honobu Yonezawa | Inshitemiru (インシテミル) (The Incite Mill) |

== 2009 ==
Kono Mystery ga Sugoi! 2009 (Takarajimasha. December, 2008)

International
| Rank | Author | Title |
|---|---|---|
| 1 | Tom Rob Smith | Child 44 |
| 2 | R. D. Wingfield | Hard Frost |
| 3 | Dennis Lehane | The Given Day |
| 4 | Joe Hill | 20th Century Ghosts |
| 5 | Jeffery Deaver | The Sleeping Doll |
| 6 | Henning Mankell | The Return of the Dancing Master |
| 7 | S. J. Rozan | Winter and Night |
| 8 | Troy Cook | 47 Rules of Highly Effective Bank Robbers |
| 9 | Steve Hockensmith | Holmes on the Range |
| 10 | D. M. Devine | This Is Your Death |

Japanese
| Rank | Author | Title |
|---|---|---|
| 1 | Kotaro Isaka | Goruden Suranba (ゴールデンスランバー); English translation: Remote Control |
| 2 | Koji Yanagi | Joker Game (ジョーカー・ゲーム, Joka Gemu) |
| 3 | Masaki Tsuji | Kanzen Ren'ai (完全恋愛) |
| 4 | Kanae Minato | Kokuhaku (告白); English translation: Confessions |
| 5 | Yusuke Kishi | Shinsekai yori (新世界より) (From the New World) |
| 6 | Shusuke Michio | Karasu no Oyayubi (カラスの親指) |
| 7 | Toshiyuki Tajima | Kuroyuri (黒百合) |
| 8 | Shinzo Mitsuda | Yamamma no gotoki Warau Mono (山魔の如き嗤うもの) |
| 9 | Otaro Maijo | Disuko Tantei Suiyobi (ディスコ探偵水曜日) |
| 10 | Shusuke Michio | Ratto Man (ラットマン) |

== 2010 ==
Kono Mystery ga Sugoi! 2010 (Takarajimasha. December, 2009)

International
| Rank | Author | Title |
|---|---|---|
| 1 | Don Winslow | The Power of the Dog |
| 2 | Stieg Larsson | The Girl with the Dragon Tattoo |
| 3 | Michael Chabon | The Yiddish Policemen's Union |
| 4 | Matt Ruff | Bad Monkeys |
| 5 | Jeffery Deaver | The Broken Window |
| 6 | Tom Rob Smith | The Secret Speech |
| 7 | John Hart | Down River |
| 8 | Donald E. Westlake | Thieves' Dozen |
| 9 | Stieg Larsson | The Girl Who Played with Fire |
| 10 | Michael Connelly | The Lincoln Lawyer |
| 10 | Stieg Larsson | The Girl Who Kicked the Hornets' Nest |

Japanese
| Rank | Author | Title |
|---|---|---|
| 1 | Keigo Higashino | Shinzanmono (新参者) |
| 2 | Koji Yanagi | Daburu Joka (ダブル・ジョーカー) |
| 3 | Yukito Ayatsuji | Anazā (アナザー); English translation: Another |
| 4 | Honobu Yonezawa | Tsuiso Godansho (追想五断章) |
| 5 | Toshihiko Yahagi; Shiro Tsukasaki (ja) | Inu nara Futsu no Koto (犬なら普通のこと) |
| 6 | Ko Amemura (ja) | Nemmaku Tokage (粘膜蜥蜴) |
| 7 | Setsuko Shinoda (ja) | Kaso Girei (仮想儀礼) |
| 8 | Joh Sasaki | Bosetsuken (暴雪圏) |
| 9 | Shusuke Michio | Ryujin no Ame (龍神の雨) |
| 10 | Honobu Yonezawa | Shuki Gentei Kurikinton Jiken (秋期限定栗きんとん事件) |

== 2011 ==
Kono Mystery ga Sugoi! 2011 (Takarajimasha. December, 2010)

International
| Rank | Author | Title |
|---|---|---|
| 1 | Carol O'Connell | Bone by Bone |
| 2 | Boston Teran | The World Eve Left Us |
| 3 | David Benioff | City of Thieves |
| 4 | Don Winslow | The Winter of Frankie Machine |
| 5 | John Hart | The Last Child |
| 6 | Michael Connelly | Echo Park |
| 7 | Sarah Waters | The Little Stranger |
| 8 | Louis Bayard | The Pale Blue Eye |
| 9 | Jeffery Deaver | Roadside Crosses |
| 10 | Jo Walton | Farthing I |

Japanese
| Rank | Author | Title |
|---|---|---|
| 1 | Yusuke Kishi | Aku no Kyoten (悪の教典) |
| 2 | Soji Shimada | Sharaku : Tojita Kuni no Maboroshi (写楽 閉じた国の幻) |
| 3 | Yu Shizaki (ja) | Sakebi to Inori (叫びと祈り) |
| 4 | Yutaka Maya | Sekigan no Shojo (隻眼の少女) |
| 5 | Hikaru Okuizumi | Shuman no Yubi (シューマンの指) |
| 6 | Kotaro Isaka | Maria Bitoru (マリアビートル) |
| 7 | Shinzo Mitsuda | Mizuchi no gotoki Shizumu Mono (水魑の如き沈むもの) |
| 8 | Miyuki Miyabe | Kogure Shashinkan (小暮写真館) |
| 9 | Kanan Nanakawa (ja) | Arubatorosu wa Habatakanai (アルバトロスは羽ばたかない) |
| 10 | Taku Ashibe | Kisokyu Satsujin Jiken (綺想宮殺人事件) |

== 2012 ==
Kono Mystery ga Sugoi! 2012 (Takarajimasha. December, 2011)

International
| Rank | Author | Title |
|---|---|---|
| 1 | David Gordon | The Serialist |
| 2 | Ferdinand von Schirach | Crime |
| 3 | Tom Rob Smith | Agent 6 |
| 4 | Henning Mankell | One Step Behind |
| 5 | James Ellroy | Blood's a Rover |
| 6 | Jack Kerley | Blood Brother |
| 7 | Don Winslow | Satori |
| 8 | Tom Franklin | Crooked Letter, Crooked Letter |
| 9 | Kate Morton | The Forgotten Garden |
| 10 | Michael Cox | The Meaning of Night |

Japanese
| Rank | Author | Title |
|---|---|---|
| 1 | Kazuaki Takano | Jenosaido (ジェノサイド); English translation: Genocide of One |
| 2 | Honobu Yonezawa | Oreta Ryukotsu (折れた竜骨) |
| 3 | Hiroko Minagawa | Hirakaseteitadaki Koeidesu (開かせていただき光栄です) |
| 4 | Arimasa Osawa | Kizuna-kairo Shinjuku-zame X (絆回廊 新宿鮫X) |
| 5 | Mahokaru Numata | Yuri-gokoro (ユリゴコロ); English translation: Nan-Core |
| 6 | Itsuki Nagasawa | Shoshitsu Guradeshon (消失グラデーション) |
| 7 | Yutaka Maya | Merukatoru Kaku Katariki (メルカトルかく語りき) |
| 8 | Joh Sasaki | Keikan no Joken (警官の条件) |
| 9 | Ryoichi Kano | Kokoro ni Hyo no Furishikiru (心に雹の降りしきる) |
| 9 | Ryoe Tsukimura (ja) | Kiryu Keisatsu : Jibaku Joko (機龍警察 自爆条項) |

== 2013 ==
Kono Mystery ga Sugoi! 2013 (Takarajimasha. December, 2012)

International
| Rank | Author | Title |
|---|---|---|
| 1 | Steve Hamilton | The Lock Artist |
| 2 | David Peace | Occupied City |
| 3 | Scott Turow | Innocent |
| 4 | Arnaldur Indriðason | Jar City |
| 5 | Friedrich Dürrenmatt | Der Sturz (The Coup) / Das Sterben der Pythia |
| 5 | Henning Mankell | Firewall |
| 7 | China Miéville | The City & the City |
| 8 | Jeffery Deaver | The Burning Wire |
| 9 | Carlos Ruiz Zafón | The Angel's Game |
| 10 | Alan Glenn | Amerikan Eagle |
| 10 | Lawrence Block | A Drop of the Hard Stuff |

Japanese
| Rank | Author | Title |
|---|---|---|
| 1 | Hideo Yokoyama | Rokuyon (64); English translation: Six Four |
| 2 | Miyuki Miyabe | Soromon no Gisho (ソロモンの偽証) |
| 3 | Ryoe Tsukimura | Kiryu Keisatsu : Ankoku Shijo (機龍警察 暗黒市場) |
| 4 | Shinzo Mitsuda | Yujo no gotoki Uramu Mono (幽女の如き怨むもの) |
| 5 | Ken Nishimura (ja) | Chi no Soko no Yama (地の底のヤマ) |
| 6 | Maha Harada (ja) | Rakuen no Kanvasu (楽園のカンヴァス) |
| 7 | Fumio Takano (ja) | Karamazofu no Imoto (カラマーゾフの妹) |
| 8 | Rintaro Norizuki | Kingu o Sagase (キングを探せ) |
| 9 | Yukito Ayatsuji | Kimenkan no Satsujin (奇面館の殺人) |
| 10 | Yusuke Miyauchi (ja) | Banjo no Yoru (盤上の夜) |

== 2014 ==
Kono Mystery ga Sugoi! 2014 (Takarajimasha. December, 2013)

International
| Rank | Author | Title |
|---|---|---|
| 1 | Stephen King | 11/22/63 |
| 2 | Minette Walters | Acid Row |
| 3 | R. D. Wingfield | Winter Frost |
| 4 | Patrick deWitt | The Sisters Brothers |
| 5 | Dennis Lehane | Live By Night |
| 6 | Jeffery Deaver | More Twisted |
| 7 | Jack Kerley | In the Blood |
| 8 | Julian Barnes | The Sense of an Ending |
| 9 | Gillian Flynn | Gone Girl |
| 10 | Arnaldur Indriðason | Silence of the Grave |

Japanese
| Rank | Author | Title |
|---|---|---|
| 1 | Rintaro Norizuki | Nokkusu Mashin [Knox's Machine] (ノックス・マシン) |
| 2 | Hiroki Nagaoka (ja) | Kyojo (教場) |
| 3 | Akira Higashiyama (ja) | Brakku Raida [Black Rider] (ブラックライダー) |
| 4 | Yasumi Kobayashi | Arisu-Goroshi (アリス殺し) |
| 5 | Kotaro Isaka | Shinigami no Furyoku (死神の浮力) |
| 6 | Yu Shizaki | Ribasaido Chirudoren [Riverside Children] (リバーサイド・チルドレン) |
| 7 | Honobu Yonezawa | Rikashiburu [Recursi-ble] (リカーシブル) |
| 8 | Shusuke Shizukui | Kensatsu-gawa no Zainin (検察側の罪人) |
| 9 | Soji Shimada | Seiro no Umi (星籠の海) |
| 10 | Aki Hamanaka (ja) | Rosuto Kea [Lost Care] (ロスト・ケア) |
| 10 | Keigo Higashino | Inori no Maku ga Oriru Toki (祈りの幕が下りる時) |

== 2015 ==
Kono Mystery ga Sugoi! 2015 (Takarajimasha. December, 2014)

International
| Rank | Author | Title |
|---|---|---|
| 1 | Pierre Lemaitre | Alex |
| 2 | Kate Morton | The Secret Keeper |
| 3 | Roger Hobbs | Ghostman |
| 4 | Terry Hayes | I Am Pilgrim |
| 5 | Daniel Friedman | Don’t Ever Get Old |
| 6 | Joël Dicker | The Truth About the Harry Quebert Affair |
| 7 | Helen McCloy | The One That Got Away |
| 8 | Minette Walters | Chickenfeed and The Tinder Box |
| 9 | Mark Greaney | Dead Eye |
| 10 | Henning Mankell | The Man from Beijing |

Japanese
| Rank | Author | Title |
|---|---|---|
| 1 | Honobu Yonezawa | Mangan (満願) |
| 2 | Yutaka Maya | Sayonara Kamisama (さよなら神様) |
| 3 | Atsushi Shimomura (ja) | Yami ni Kaoru Uso (闇に香る嘘) |
| 4 | Mikihiko Renjo | Chiisana Ihojin (小さな異邦人) |
| 5 | Ryoe Tsukimura | Kiryu Keisatsu: Mibo Ryodan (機龍警察 未亡旅団) |
| 6 | Ryoe Tsukimura | Dobaku no Hana (土漠の花) |
| 7 | Miyuki Miyabe | Petero no Soretsu (ペテロの葬列) |
| 8 | Hiroyuki Kurokawa (ja) | Hamon (破門) |
| 9 | Mikihiko Renjo | Joo (女王) |
| 10 | Taku Ashibe | Ijigen no Yakata no Satsujin (異次元の館の殺人) |

== 2016 ==
Kono Mystery ga Sugoi! 2016 (Takarajimasha. December, 2015)

International
| Rank | Author | Title |
|---|---|---|
| 1 | Jeffery Deaver | Skin Collector |
| 2 | Pierre Lemaitre | Irene |
| 3 | William Kent Krueger | Ordinary Grace |
| 4 | Nick Harkaway | Angelmaker |
| 5 | Arnaldur Indriðason | Voices |
| 6 | Daniel Friedman | Don't Ever Look Back |
| 6 | Minette Walters | The Devil's Feather |
| 8 | Steve Cavanagh | The Defence |
| 9 | Michel Bussi | Un avion sans elle |
| 10 | Jack Kerley | Buried Alive |

Japanese
| Rank | Author | Title |
|---|---|---|
| 1 | Honobu Yonezawa | O to Sakasu (王とサーカス) |
| 2 | Nowaki Fukamidori (ja) | Senjo no Kokku-tachi (戦場のコックたち) |
| 3 | Yuko Yuzuki (ja) | Koro no Chi (孤狼の血) |
| 4 | Nanami Wakatake | Sayonara no Teguchi (さよならの手口) |
| 5 | Akira Higashiyama | Ryu (流) |
| 6 | Reiichiro Fukami (ja) | Misuteri Arina (ミステリー・アリーナ) |
| 7 | Jun Kurachi (ja) | Katagiri Daizaburo to XYZ no Higeki (片桐大三郎とXYZの悲劇) |
| 8 | Alice Arisugawa | Kagi no Kakatta Otoko (鍵の掛かった男) |
| 9 | Yoshinaga Fujita | Chi no Choki (血の弔旗) |
| 10 | Takekuni Kitayama (ja) | Orugoriennu (オルゴーリェンヌ) |

== 2017 ==
Kono Mystery ga Sugoi! 2017 (Takarajimasha. December, 2016)

International
| Rank | Author | Title |
|---|---|---|
| 1 | Roslund/Hellström | Björndansen |
| 2 | Don Winslow | The Cartel |
| 3 | Stephen King | Mr. Mercedes |
| 4 | Charles Willeford | Pick-Up |
| 5 | Jack Vance | The Complete Magnus Ridolph |
| 6 | Pierre Lemaitre | Sacrifices; English translation: Camille |
| 7 | Michael Connelly | The Drop |
| 8 | Mark Greaney | Back Blast |
| 9 | Dennis Lehane | World Gone By |
| 10 | Jeffery Deaver | Solitude Creek |

Japanese
| Rank | Author | Title |
|---|---|---|
| 1 | Takemoto Kenji | Ruikou Meikiyuu (涙香迷宮) |
| 2 | Nanami Wakatake | Shizuka Na Enten (静かな炎天) |
| 3 | Honobu Yonezawa | Shinjitsu No Jū-mētoru Temae (真実の10メートル手前) |
| 4 | Aoyama Bunpei | Han Seki (半席) |
| 5 | Ashizawa You | Yurusareyou Towa Omoimasen (許されようとは思いません) |
| 6 | Nagaura Kiyou | Riboruba Riri (リボルバー・リリー) |
| 7 | Shiota Takeshi | Tsumi No Koe (罪の声) |
| 8 | Shirai Tomoyuki | Oyasumi Jimmensou (おやすみ人面瘡) |
| 9 | Miyuki Miyabe | Majutsu wa Sasayaku (希望荘) |
| 10 | Ichikawa Yuto | Ichikawa Yuto Jieri Fisshu Ha Ranai (ジェリーフィッシュは凍らない) |

== See also ==
- Honkaku Mystery Best 10
- Japanese detective fiction
- Tozai Mystery Best 100
- The Top 100 Crime Novels of All Time
- Kono Light Novel ga Sugoi!
- Kono Manga ga Sugoi!
