= Mystery Writers of Japan Award =

Annual fiction and biography award

The Mystery Writers of Japan Awards (日本推理作家協会賞, Nihon Suiri Sakka Kyōkai Shō) are presented every year by the Mystery Writers of Japan. They honor the best in crime fiction and critical/biographical work published in the previous year.

== MWJ Award for Best Novel winners (1948–1951, 1976–present) ==
	Year	Winner	Winning entry	Available in English Translation
1	1948	Seishi Yokomizo	Honjin Satsujin Jiken (本陣殺人事件)	The Honjin Murders
2	1949	Ango Sakaguchi	Furenzoku Satsujin Jiken (不連続殺人事件)	
3	1950	Akimitsu Takagi	Nomen Satsujin Jiken (能面殺人事件)	The Noh Mask Murder
4	1951	Udaru Oshita (ja)	Ishi no Shita no Kiroku (石の下の記録)	
	5th - 28th, see MWJ Award for Best Work			
29	1976		No Award Presented	
30	1977		No Award Presented	
31	1978	Tsumao Awasaka (ja)	Midare Karakuri (乱れからくり)	
31	1978	Shohei Ooka	Jiken (事件)	
32	1979	Yoshiaki Hiyama (ja)	Sutarin Ansatsu Keikaku (スターリン暗殺計画)	
32	1979	Shin Tendo (ja)	Dai Yukai (大誘拐)	
33	1980		No Award Presented	
34	1981	Kyotaro Nishimura	Taminaru Satsujin Jiken (終着駅殺人事件)	
35	1982	Masaki Tsuji	Arisu no Kuni no Satsujin (アリスの国の殺人)	
36	1983	Koshi Kurumizawa	Tenzan o Koete (天山を越えて)	
37	1984	Ichiro Kano (ja)	Hokku shi no Ikyo no Boken (ホック氏の異郷の冒険)	
38	1985	Kenzo Kitakata	Kawaki no Machi (渇きの街)	
38	1985	Hiroko Minagawa	Kabe Tabishibai Satsujin Jiken (壁・旅芝居殺人事件)	
39	1986	Futari Okajima (ja)	Chokoreto Gemu (チョコレートゲーム)	
39	1986	Tatsuo Shimizu (ja)	Somuite Kokyo (背いて故郷)	
40	1987	Go Osaka	Kadisu no Akai Hoshi (カディスの赤い星)	The Red Star of Cadiz
40	1987	Katsuhiko Takahashi	Hokusai Satsujin Jiken (北斎殺人事件)	
41	1988	Kenji Kosugi (ja)	Kizuna (絆)	
42	1989	Yoichi Funado	Densetsu Naki Chi (伝説なき地)	
42	1989	Shunzo Waku (ja)	Ugetsuso Satsujin Jiken (雨月荘殺人事件)	
43	1990	Joh Sasaki	Etorofu hatsu Kinkyuden (エトロフ発緊急電)	
44	1991	Arimasa Osawa	Shinjukuzame (新宿鮫)	Shinjuku Shark
45	1992	Yukito Ayatsuji	Tokeikan no Satsujin (時計館の殺人)	
45	1992	Miyuki Miyabe	Ryu wa Nemuru (龍は眠る)	The Sleeping Dragon
46	1993	Kaoru Takamura	Riviera o Ute (リヴィエラを撃て)	
47	1994	Ramo Nakajima	Gadara no Buta (ガダラの豚)	
48	1995	Yoshinaga Fujita	Kotetsu no Kishi (鋼鉄の騎士)	
48	1995	Ichi Orihara (ja)	Chimmoku no Kyoshitsu (沈黙の教室)	
49	1996	Natsuhiko Kyogoku	Mōryō no Hako (魍魎の匣)	
49	1996	Katsufumi Umehara (ja)	Soriton no Akuma (ソリトンの悪魔)	
50	1997	Yuichi Shimpo (ja)	Dasshu (奪取)	
51	1998	Seishu Hase	Rekuiemu Fuyajo 2 (鎮魂歌 不夜城II)	
51	1998	Natsuo Kirino	Auto (OUT)	Out
52	1999	Ryoichi Kano (ja)	Maboroshi no Onna (幻の女)	
52	1999	Keigo Higashino	Himitsu (秘密)	Naoko
53	2000	Harutoshi Fukui (ja)	Bokoku no Ijisu (亡国のイージス)	
53	2000	Arata Tendo (ja)	Eien no Ko (永遠の仔)	
54	2001	Naomi Azuma (ja)	Zanko (残光)	
54	2001	Hiroe Suga	Eien no Mori (永遠の森)	
55	2002	Hideo Furukawa (ja)	Arabia no Yoru no Shuzoku (アラビアの夜の種族)	
55	2002	Masaki Yamada	Misuteri Opera (ミステリ・オペラ)	
56	2003	Alice Arisugawa	Mare Tetsudo no Nazo (マレー鉄道の謎)	
56	2003	Mitsufumi Asagure (ja)	Ishi no Naka no Kumo (石の中の蜘蛛)	
57	2004	Ryosuke Kakine (ja)	Wairudo Souru (ワイルド・ソウル)	
57	2004	Shogo Utano (ja)	Hazakura no Kisetsu ni Kimi o Omou to iu Koto (葉桜の季節に君を想うということ)	
58	2005	Yusuke Kishi	Garasu no Hamma (硝子のハンマー)	
58	2005	Atsunori Tomatsu (ja)	Ken to Bara no Natsu (剣と薔薇の夏)	
59	2006	Riku Onda	Yujinia (ユージニア)	The Aosawa Murders
60	2007	Kazuki Sakuraba	Akakuchibake no Densetsu (赤朽葉家の伝説)	Red Girls: The Legend of the Akakuchibas
61	2008	Bin Konno (ja)	Kadan Impeisosa 2 (果断 隠蔽捜査2)	
62	2009	Shusuke Michio (ja)	Karasu no Oyayubi (カラスの親指)	
62	2009	Koji Yanagi	Joka Gemu (Joker Game) (ジョーカー・ゲーム)	
63	2010	Ko Amemura (ja)	Nemmaku Tokage (粘膜蜥蜴)	
63	2010	Tokuro Nukui (ja)	Ranhansha (乱反射)	
64	2011	Yutaka Maya (ja)	Sekigan no Shojo (隻眼の少女)	
64	2011	Honobu Yonezawa	Oreta Ryukotsu (折れた竜骨)	
65	2012	Kazuaki Takano	Jenosaido (ジェノサイド)	Genocide of One
66	2013	Muneki Yamada (ja)	Hyakunen Ho (百年法)	
67	2014	Kotaro Tsunekawa (ja)	Kin'iro Kikai (金色機械)	
68	2015	Ryoe Tsukimura (ja)	Dobaku no Hana (土漠の花)	
68	2015	Kazumasa Hayami (ja)	Inosento Deizu [Innocent Days] (イノセント・デイズ)	
69	2016	Yuko Yuzuki (ja)	Korō no Chi (孤狼の血)	
70	2017	Makoto Usami (ja)	Gusha no Doku (愚者の毒)	
71	2018	Seiji Kodokoro (ja)	Ikusa no Soko (いくさの底)	
72	2019	Aki Hamanaka (ja)	Itetsuku Taiyō (凍てつく太陽)	
73	2020	Katsuhiro Go (ja)	Suwan [Swan] (スワン)	
74	2021	Izumi Sakagami (ja)	Inbijiburu [Invisible] (インビジブル)	
74	2021	Tomoya Sakurada (ja)	Semi Kaeru (蟬かえる)	
75	2022	Taku Ashibe	Omarike Satsujin Jiken (大鞠家殺人事件)	
76	2023	Yo Ashizawa (ja)	Yoru no Dōhyō (夜の道標)	
76	2023	Satoshi Ogawa (ja)	Your Own Quiz (君のクイズ, Kimi no Kuizu)	
77	2024	Yugo Aosaki（ja）	Jirai Glico（地雷グリコ）	
77	2024	Akira Ogidou（ja）	Night Land（不夜島（ナイトランド））	
78	2025	Kajyu Koizumi（ja）	konrondo（崑崙奴）	

== MWJ Award for Best Short Story winners (1948–1951, 1976–present) ==
	Year	Winner	Winning entry	Available in English Translation
1	1948	Takataro Kigi (ja)	Shingetsu (新月)	
2	1949	Futaro Yamada	Ganchu no Akuma (眼中の悪魔), Kyozo Inraku (虚像淫楽)	
3	1950	Sunao Otsubo (ja)	Rinchi (私刑), Nehan Yuki (涅槃雪), Hokuro (黒子)	
4	1951	Kazuo Shimada (ja)	Shakaibu Kisha (社会部記者), Fusen Ma (風船魔)	
	5th - 28th, see MWJ Award for Best Work			
29	1976	Yasuji Toita (ja)	Gurinsha no Kodomo (グリーン車の子供)	
30	1977	Eitaro Ishizawa (ja)	Shisen (視線)	
31	1978		No Award Presented	
32	1979	Takashi Atoda (ja)	Raihosha (来訪者)	"The Visitor" (EQMM December 1988)
33	1980		No Award Presented	
34	1981	Etsuko Niki	Akai Neko (赤い猫)	
34	1981	Mikihiko Renjo	Modorigawa Shinju (戻り川心中)	
35	1982	Keisuke Kusaka (ja)	Uguisu o Yobu Shonen (鶯を呼ぶ少年), Ki ni Noboru Inu (木に登る犬)	
36	1983		No Award Presented	
37	1984	Ro Tomono (ja)	Kizutsuita Yaju (傷ついた野獣) (Short Stories)	
38	1985		No Award Presented	
39	1986		No Award Presented	
40	1987		No Award Presented	
41	1988		No Award Presented	
42	1989	Mariko Koike	Tsuma no Onna Tomodachi (妻の女友達)	
43	1990		No Award Presented	
44	1991	Kaoru Kitamura	Yoru no Semi (夜の蝉) (Short Stories)	
45	1992		No Award Presented	
46	1993		No Award Presented	
47	1994	Jun Saito (ja)	Ru Jitan (ル・ジタン)	
47	1994	Kiichiro Suzuki (ja)	Mendo Mite Ageru ne (めんどうみてあげるね)	
48	1995	Tomoko Kano (ja)	Garasu no Kirin (ガラスの麒麟)	
48	1995	Masaya Yamaguchi (ja)	Nihon Satsujin Jiken (日本殺人事件) (Short Stories)	
49	1996	Hiroyuki Kurokawa (ja)	Kaunto Puran (カウント・プラン)	
50	1997		No Award Presented	
51	1998		No Award Presented	
52	1999	Ko Kitamori (ja)	Hana no Moto nite Haru Shinan (花の下にて春死なむ) (Short Stories)	
53	2000	Hideo Yokoyama	Doki (動機)	"Motive" (EQMM May 2008)
54	2001		No Award Presented	
55	2002	Yuri Mitsuhara (ja)	Juhachi no Natsu (十八の夏)	"Eighteenth Summer" (EQMM December 2004)
55	2002	Rintaro Norizuki	Toshi Densetsu Pazuru (都市伝説パズル)	"An Urban Legend Puzzle" (EQMM January 2004)
56	2003		No Award Presented	
57	2004	Kotaro Isaka	Shinigami no Seido (死神の精度)	"The Precision of the Agent of Death" (EQMM July 2006)
58	2005		No Award Presented	
59	2006	Yumeaki Hirayama (ja)	Dokuhakusuru Yunibasaru Yoko Merukatoru (独白するユニバーサル横メルカトル)	"Monologue of a Universal Transverse Mercator Projection" (Hanzai Japan, 2015)
60	2007		No Award Presented	
61	2008	Hiroki Nagaoka (ja)	Kataegiki (傍聞き)	"Heard at One Remove" (EQMM February 2010)
62	2009	Keisuke Sone (ja)	Nettaiya (熱帯夜)	
62	2009	Hirofumi Tanaka (ja)	Shibui Yume (渋い夢)	
63	2010	Yoshiaki Ando (ja)	Zuikan (随監)	
64	2011	Reiichiro Fukami (ja)	Ningen no Songen to Happyaku Metoru (人間の尊厳と八〇〇メートル)	
65	2012	Kanae Minato	Bokyo, Umi no Hoshi (望郷、海の星)	
66	2013	Nanami Wakatake (ja)	Kurai Etsuryu (暗い越流)	
67	2014		No Award Presented	
68	2015		No Award Presented	
69	2016	Emi Nagashima (ja)	Babanuki (ババ抜き)	
69	2016	Naoki Oishi(ja)	Obāchan to Issho (おばあちゃんといっしょ)	
70	2017	Gaku Yakumaru (ja)	Tasogare (黄昏)	
71	2018	Ten Furuta (ja)	Itsuwari no Haru (偽りの春)	
72	2019	Ichi Sawamura (ja)	Gakko wa Shi no Nioi (学校は死の匂い)	
73	2020	Jun Yagi (ja)	Otto no Hone (夫の骨)	
74	2021	Shinichiro Yuki (ja)	#Kakusan_Kibo (#拡散希望)	
75	2022	Yu Itsuki (ja)	Suketazu Warutsu [Skaters' Waltz] (スケーターズ・ワルツ)	
75	2022	Seiichiro Oyama (ja)	Tokeiya Tantei to Niritsuhaihan no Aribai (時計屋探偵と二律背反のアリバイ)	
76	2023	Yasuhiko Nishizawa (ja)	Ibunshi no Kanojo (異分子の彼女)	
77	2024	Kaoru Sakasaki(ja)	Bell o Narashite（ベルを鳴らして）	
77	2024	Yusuke Miyauchi(ja)	Dionysios Keikaku（ディオニソス計画）	
78	2025	Mikihiko Hisanaga（ja）	Kuroi Ansoku no Hibi（黒い安息の日々）	

== MWJ Award for Best Critical/Biographical Work winners (1976–present) ==
- MWJ Award for Best Work (1952–1975) winners for their Critical Work
  - 05 (1952) - EDOGAWA Rampo, Gen'ei-jo (Studies on detective fiction)
  - 19 (1966) - Kawataro Nakajima, Suiri Shosetsu Tembo (Studies on detective fiction)

	Year	Winner	Winning entry	Available in English Translation
29	1976	Manji Gonda (ja)	Nihon Tantei Sakka Ron (日本探偵作家論) (Studies on Japanese detective fiction writers)	
30	1977	Masao Yamamura (ja)	Waga Kaikyuteki Tantei Sakka Ron (わが懐旧的探偵作家論) (Studies on Japanese detective fiction writers)	
31	1978	Amehiko Aoki (ja)	Kagai Jugyo: Misuteri ni okeru Otoko to Onna no Kenkyu (課外授業 ミステリにおける男と女の研究) (Essay)	
31	1978	Takashi Ishikawa (ja)	SF no Jidai (SFの時代) (Studies on Japanese science fiction)	
32	1979	Jinichi Uekusa (ja)	Misuteri no Genko wa Yonaka ni Tetsuya de Kako (ミステリの原稿は夜中に徹夜で書こう) (Essay)	
33	1980		No Award Presented	
34	1981	Eisuke Nakazono	Yami no Kanibaru: Supai Misuteri e no Shotai (闇のカーニバル スパイ・ミステリィへの招待) (Studies on Spy fiction)	
35	1982		No Award Presented	
36	1983		No Award Presented	
37	1984		No Award Presented	
38	1985	Iwao Matsuyama (ja)	Rampo to Tokyo: 1920 Toshi no Kao (乱歩と東京 1920都市の貌) (Studies on Edogawa Rampo)	
38	1985	Minoru Sase (ja)	Kinzoku Batto Satsujin Jiken (金属バット殺人事件) (Crime report)	
39	1986	Yoshio Matsumura (ja)	Kaito Tai Meitantei: Furansu Misuteri no Rekishi (怪盗対名探偵 フランス・ミステリーの歴史) (Studies on French Crime fiction)	
40	1987	Hideo Ito (ja)	Meiji no Tantei Shosetsu (明治の探偵小説) (Studies on Japanese detective fiction of the Meiji period)	
41	1988		No Award Presented	
42	1989	Akira Naoi (ja)	87bunsho Gurafiti: Ed McBain no Sekai (87分署グラフィティ エド・マクベインの世界) (Studies on 87th Precinct)	
43	1990	Shunsuke Tsurumi	Yumeno Kyūsaku: Meikyu no Junin (夢野久作 迷宮の住人) (Studies on Yumeno Kyūsaku)	
44	1991	Ro Takenaka	Hyakkai Waga Harawata ni Iru: Eitaro Takenaka Sakuhin-fu (百怪、我ガ腸ニ入ル 竹中英太郎作品譜) (Studies on Eitaro Takenaka (ja))	
44	1991	Takao Tokuoka (ja)	Yokohama Yamanote no Dekigoto (横浜・山手の出来事) (Crime report)	
45	1992	Rokusuke Nozaki (ja)	Hokubei Tantei Shosetsu Ron (北米探偵小説論) (Studies on North American detective fiction)	
46	1993	Fumichika Hasebe (ja)	Obei Suiri Shosetsu Hon'yakushi (欧米推理小説翻訳史) (Studies on the history of translations of European and American crime fiction into Japanese)	
46	1993	Shinji Hata (ja)	Bunsei 11nen no Supaigassen (文政十一年のスパイ合戦) (Studies on Siebold Incident)	
47	1994	Jiro Kitagami (ja)	Boken Shosetsu Ron: Kindai Hiro Zo 100nen no Hensen (冒険小説論 近代ヒーロー像100年の変遷) (Studies on Adventure novel)	
48	1995	Saburo Kagami (ja)	Chandler Jinbutsu Jiten (チャンドラー人物事典) (Dictionary of characters of Raymond Chandler)	
49	1996		No Award Presented	
50	1997	Kyodo News Shakaibu	Chimmoku no Fairu: Ryūzō Sejima towa Nandattanoka (沈黙のファイル 「瀬島龍三」とは何だったのか) (Studies on Ryūzō Sejima)	
51	1998	Kiyoshi Kasai (ja)	Honkaku Misuteri no Genzai (本格ミステリの現在) (Studies on honkaku Mystery)	
51	1998	Kenji Kazama (ja)	Hora Shosetsu Daizen (ホラー小説大全) (Studies on Horror fiction)	
52	1999	Hidetoshi Mori (ja)	Sekai Misuteri Sakka Jiten Honkaku ha Hen (世界ミステリ作家事典［本格派篇］) (Dictionary of mystery writers)	
53	2000	Hideki Kobayashi	Gohho no Yuigon (ゴッホの遺言) (Studies on Vincent van Gogh)	
54	2001	Takayuki Ikegami (ja)	20seiki Boken Shosetsu Dokuhon Nihon hen Kaigai hen (20世紀冒険小説読本［日本篇］［海外篇］) (Studies on Adventure novel)	
54	2001	Michio Tsuzuki (ja)	Suiri Sakka no Dekiru made (推理作家の出来るまで) (Essay)	
55	2002		No Award Presented	
56	2003	Hirohisa Shimpo (ja); Yuzuru Yamamae (ja)	Gen'ei no Kura (幻影の蔵) (Studies on Edogawa Rampo)	
57	2004	Akiyuki Sengai (ja)	Minamo no Seiza Minasoko no Hoseki (水面の星座 水底の宝石) (Studies on honkaku Mystery)	
57	2004	Shigeharu Tada (ja)	Yumeno Kyūsaku Dokuhon (夢野久作読本) (Studies on Yumeno Kyūsaku)	
58	2005	Kotaro Hidaka (ja)	Fujichaku (不時着) (Studies on Kamikaze)	
59	2006	Hiroshi Gohara (ja)	Seicho Matsumoto Jiten Kettei ban (松本清張事典 決定版) (Studies on Seicho Matsumoto)	
59	2006	Tetsutaka Shibata (ja)	Shimoyama Jiken Saigo no Shogen (下山事件 最後の証言) (Studies on Shimoyama incident)	
60	2007	Nobumitsu Kodaka (ja)	Watashi no Hadoboirudo Katayude Tamago no Sengo Shi (私のハードボイルド 固茹で玉子の戦後史) (Studies on Hardboiled)	
60	2007	Masaaki Tatsumi (ja)	Ronri no Kumo no Su no Naka de (論理の蜘蛛の巣の中で) (Studies on honkaku Mystery)	
61	2008	Junichiro Kida (ja)	Genso to Kaiki no Jidai (幻想と怪奇の時代) (Studies on Horror fiction)	
61	2008	Hazuki Saisho (ja)	Shinichi Hoshi 1001wa o Tsukutta Hito (星新一 一〇〇一話をつくった人) (Studies on Shinichi Hoshi)	
62	2009	Toshiaki Endo (ja)	Nazo no Kaizodo: Webu Jidai no Honkaku Misuteri (「謎」の解像度 ウェブ時代の本格ミステリ) (Studies on honkaku Mystery)	
62	2009	Yuichiro Kurihara (ja)	Tosaku no Bungaku Shi: Shijo Media Chosakuken (〈盗作〉の文学史 市場・メディア・著作権) (Studies on the history of Plagiarism)	
63	2010	Kentaro Komori (ja)	Eibungaku no Chika Suimyaku: Koten Misuteri Kenkyu Ruiko Kuroiwa (ja) Hon'an Genten kara Queen made (英文学の地下水脈 古典ミステリ研究 黒岩涙香翻案原典からクイーンまで) (Studies on classical detective fiction)	
64	2011	Masao Higashi (ja)	Tono Monogatari to Kaidan no Jidai (遠野物語と怪談の時代) (Studies on The Legends of Tono)	
65	2012	Jun'ya Yokota	Kindai Nihon Kiso Shosetsu Shi: Meiji hen (近代日本奇想小説史 明治篇)	
66	2013	Koichi Suwabe (ja)	Maruta no Taka Kogi (『マルタの鷹』 講義) (Studies on The Maltese Falcon)	
67	2014	Kiyoshi Shimizu (ja)	Satsujinhan wa Soko ni Iru (殺人犯はそこにいる)	
67	2014	Motoi Taniguchi (ja)	Henkaku Tantei Shosetsu Nyumon (変格探偵小説入門) (Studies on unorthodox detective fiction)	
68	2015	Masahiko Kikuni (ja)	Hondana Tantei Saigo no Aisatsu (本棚探偵最後の挨拶)	
68	2015	Aoi Shimotsuki	Agasa Kurisuti Kanzen Koryaku (アガサ・クリスティー完全攻略) (lit. The Definitive Guide to Agatha Christie)	
69	2016	Yoshinobu Kadoi (ja)	Majikaru Hisutorī Tsuā [Magical History Tour] (マジカル・ヒストリー・ツアー) (Studies on historical mystery)	
70	2017		No Award Presented	
71	2018	Noboru Miyata (ja)	Shōwa no Hon'yaku Shuppan Jikenbo (昭和の翻訳出版事件簿)	
72	2019	Yasuo Nagayama (ja)	Nihon SF Seishinshi Kanzenban (日本SF精神史【完全版】) (Studies on Japanese science fiction)	
73	2020	Seung Chul Kim	Endō Shūsaku to Tantei Shōsetsu (遠藤周作と探偵小説) (Studies on Shūsaku Endō)	
74	2021	Keisuke Mada	Mada Keisuke Misuteri Ron Shū: Koten Tantei Shōsetsu no Tanoshimi (真田啓介ミステリ論集 古典探偵小説の愉しみ) (Studies on the Golden Age of Detective Fiction)	
75	2022	Osamu Komori (ja)	Tanpen Misuteri no 200 Nen (短編ミステリの二百年) (Anthology of mystery stories)	
76	2023	Masamichi Higurashi (ja)	Shārokku Hōmuzu Baiburu [Sherlock Holmes Bible] (シャーロック・ホームズ・バイブル) (Studies on Sherlock Holmes)	
77	2024	Masaki Kawade	Mystery Library Investigation Sengo Honyaku Mystey Sousho Tanbou（ミステリ・ライブラリ・インヴェスティゲーション 戦後翻訳ミステリ叢書探訪） (Studies on translated crime fiction)	
77	2024	Shosaku Naka(ja)	Edogawa Rampo Nenpu Shusei（江戸川乱歩年譜集成） (Studies on Edogawa Rampo)	
78	2025	Matsukoi Sugie (ja)	Nihon no Hanzai Shosetsu（日本の犯罪小説） (Studies on Japanese crime fiction)	

== MWJ Award for Best Work winners (1952–1975) ==
	Year	Winner	Winning entry		Available in English Translation
5	1952	Jun Mizutani (ja)	Aru Ketto (ある決闘)	Short Story	
5	1952	EDOGAWA Rampo	Gen'ei-jo (幻影城)	Critical Essay	
6	1953		No Award Presented		
7	1954		No Award Presented		
8	1955	Sango Nagase	Baikoku-do (売国奴)	Short Story	
9	1956	Jokichi Hikage (ja)	Kitsune no Tori (狐の鶏)	Short Story	
10	1957	Seicho Matsumoto	Kao (顔)	Short Stories	
11	1958	Kikuo Tsunoda (ja)	Fue Fukeba Hito ga Shinu (笛吹けば人が死ぬ)	Short Story	
12	1959	Yorichika Arima (ja)	Yommannin no Mokugekisha (四万人の目撃者)	Novel	
13	1960	Tetsuya Ayukawa	Zoo no Kaseki (憎悪の化石), Kuroi Hakucho (黒い白鳥)	Novel	
14	1961	Tsutomu Minakami	Umi no Kiba (海の牙)	Novel	
14	1961	Saho Sasazawa	Hitokui (人喰い)	Novel	
15	1962	Takashi Asuka (ja)	Hosoi Akai Ito (細い赤い糸)	Novel	
16	1963	Takao Tsuchiya (ja)	Kage no Kokuhatsu (影の告発)	Novel	
17	1964	Tensei Kono	Satsui to iu Na no Kachiku (殺意という名の家畜)	Novel	
17	1964	Shoji Yuki (ja)	Yoru no Owaru Toki (夜の終る時)	Novel	
18	1965	Yo Sano	Kareinaru Shubun (華麗なる醜聞)	Novel	
19	1966	Kawataro Nakajima	Suiri Shosetsu Tembo (推理小説展望)	Critical Essay	
20	1967	Toru Miyoshi (ja)	Fujin Chitai (風塵地帯)	Novel	
21	1968	Shinichi Hoshi	Moso Ginko (妄想銀行) and his past achievement	Short Stories	
22	1969		No Award Presented		
23	1970	CHIN Shunshin	Gyokurei yo Futatabi (玉嶺よふたたび), Kujaku no Michi (孔雀の道)	Novel	
24	1971		No Award Presented		
25	1972		No Award Presented		
26	1973	Shizuko Natsuki (ja)	Johatsu: Aru Ai no Owari (蒸発 ある愛の終わり)	Novel	
26	1973	Seiichi Morimura	Fushoku no Kozo (腐食の構造)	Novel	
27	1974	Sakyo Komatsu	Nippon Chimbotsu (日本沈没)	Novel	Japan Sinks
28	1975	Ikko Shimizu (ja)	Domyaku Retto (動脈列島)	Novel	

== Nominees available in English translation ==
- Nominees for Best Novel
  - 02 (1949) - Akimitsu Takagi, The Tattoo Murder Case a.k.a. The Tattoo Murder (刺青殺人事件, Shisei Satsujin Jiken)
  - 02 (1949) - Seishi Yokomizo, Death on Gokumon Island (獄門島, Gokumon To)
  - 37 (1984) - Kenzo Kitakata, The Cage (檻, Ori)
  - 42 (1989) - Joh Sasaki, Zero Over Berlin (ベルリン飛行指令, Berlin Hikō Shirei)
  - 65 (2012) - Mahokaru Numata, Nan-Core (ユリゴコロ, Yuri-gokoro)
  - 71 (2018) - Mizuki Tsujimura, Lonely Castle in the Mirror (かがみの孤城, Kagami no Kojō)
- Nominees for Short Story
  - 08 (1955) - Tetsuya Ayukawa, "The Red Locked Room" (赤い密室, Akai Misshitsu) (Tetsuya Ayukawa, The Red Locke Room, Locked Room International, 2020)
  - 11 (1958) - Tetsuya Ayukawa, "The Five Clocks" (五つの時計, Itsutsu no Tokei) (Tetsuya Ayukawa, The Red Locke Room, Locked Room International, 2020)
  - 12 (1959) - Tetsuya Ayukawa, "The White Locked Room" (白い密室, Shiroi Misshitsu) (Tetsuya Ayukawa, The Red Locke Room, Locked Room International, 2020)
  - 56 (2003) - Otsuichi, "Dog" (犬, Inu) (A chapter of the Novel Goth)
  - 60 (2007) - Gaku Yakumaru (ja), "Rice Omelet" (オムライス, Omuraisu) (Gaku Yakumaru, A Cop's Eyes, Vertical, 2016)
  - 63 (2010) - Shunsuke Nagase (ja), "Chief" (師匠, Shisho), Ellery Queen's Mystery Magazine, February 2013

== MWJ Award for Mystery Fiction in Translation（Double Copper Award）2023–present ==
This award is for the best translated mystery novel or short story collection published in Japan in the previous year.

=== 2023 ===
Winners (in bold) and nominees.

Author	Title	Translator	Orig. Pub. Year	Country
**Niklas Natt och Dag**	**1794** / **1795**	**Miho Hellén-Halme** (ja)	**2019 / 2021**	**Sweden**
Harlan Coben	Win	Toshiki Taguchi (ja)	2021	USA
Janice Hallett	The Appeal; Japanese title: Popī no Tame ni Dekiru Koto (ポピーのためにできること) (lit. What Can Be Done for Poppy)	Ran Yamada(ja)	2021	GBR
Richard Lange	Sweet Nothing; Japanese title: Kanojo wa Suiyōbi ni Shinda (彼女は水曜日に死んだ) (lit. She Died on Wednesday)	Hiroto Yoshino	2015	USA
Stuart Turton	The Devil and the Dark Water; Japanese title: Meitantei to Umi no Akuma (名探偵と海の悪魔) (lit. The Great Detective and the Sea Devil)	Kazuyo Misumi	2020	GBR

The 2023 judges: Tatsumi Atsukawa (ja), Kazuyo Misumi, Akira Mitsuhashi, Yuki Shasendo (ja), Matsukoi Sugie (ja)

=== 2024 ===
Winners (in bold) and nominees.

Author	Title	Translator	Orig. Pub. Year	Country
**Joseph Knox**	**True Crime Story**; **Japanese title: True Crime Story（トゥルー・クライム・ストーリー）**	**Makiko Ikeda** (ja)	**2021**	**GBR**
孙 沁文（zh）	凜冬之棺; Japanese title: Gento no Hitsugi （厳冬之棺） (lit. The coffin in severe winter)	Kosaku Ai	2018	CHN
S.A. Cosby	Razorblade Tears; Japanese title: Ho ni Kanashimi wo Kizame（頬に哀しみを刻め） (lit. Carve sadness into your cheeks)	Takuro Kagayama（ja）	2021	USA
Danya Kukafka	Notes on an Execution; Japanese title: Shikeishikko no Note（死刑執行人ノート） (lit. Execution Notes)	Miho Suzuki	2022	USA
Ann Cleeves	The Long Call; Japanese title: Aiseki （哀惜） (lit. Lamentation)	Mayumi Takayama	2019	GBR

The 2024 judges:Tatsumi Atsukawa (ja), Kazuyo Misumi, Akira Mitsuhashi, Yuki Shasendo (ja), Matsukoi Sugie (ja)

=== 2025 ===
Winners (in bold) and nominees.

Author	Title	Translator	Orig. Pub. Year	Country
**Stephen King**	**Billy Summers**; **Japanese title: Billy Summers（ビリー・サマーズ）**	**Ro Shiraishi** (ja)	**2021**	**USA**
Jake Lamar	Viper's Dream; Japanese title: Viper's Dream（ヴァイパーズ・ドリーム）	Takuro Kagayama（ja）	2023	USA
馬 伯庸	両京十五日; Japanese title: Ryokyo Jugonichi（両京十五日） (lit. Two Capitals, Fifteen Days)	Masataka Saito	2020	CHN
Jo Nesbø	Kongeriket; Japanese title: Shittsui no Okoku（失墜の王国） (lit. The Fall of the Kingdom)	Megumi Suzuki（ja）	2020	NOR
Benjamin Stevenson	Everyone In My Family Has Killed Someone; Japanese title: Boku no Kazoku wa Minna Dareka wo Koroshiteru （ぼくの家族はみんな誰かを殺してる） (lit. Everyone In My Family Has Killed Someone)	Kazuko Tominaga	2022	AUS

The 2025 judges:Tatsumi Atsukawa (ja), Kazuyo Misumi, Akira Mitsuhashi, Yuki Shasendo (ja), Matsukoi Sugie (ja)

== Other awards ==
- MWJ Award for new face
  - 01 (1948) - Shigeru Kayama (ja), Kaiman-so Kidan (海鰻荘奇談) (Short story)
- MWJ Award for encouragement
  - 07 (1954) - Jojiro Okami (ja), Namari no Kobako (鉛の小函) (Novel)
  - 07 (1954) - Ro Hikawa (ja), Suiren Fujin (睡蓮夫人) (Short story)
  - 07 (1954) - Saburo Washio (ja), Nadare (雪崩) (Short story)

== See also ==
- Edogawa Rampo Prize
- Japanese detective fiction
- Edgar Award
- Daggers
- Honkaku Mystery Award
