= Katsuhiko Takahashi =

Japanese writer (born 1947)

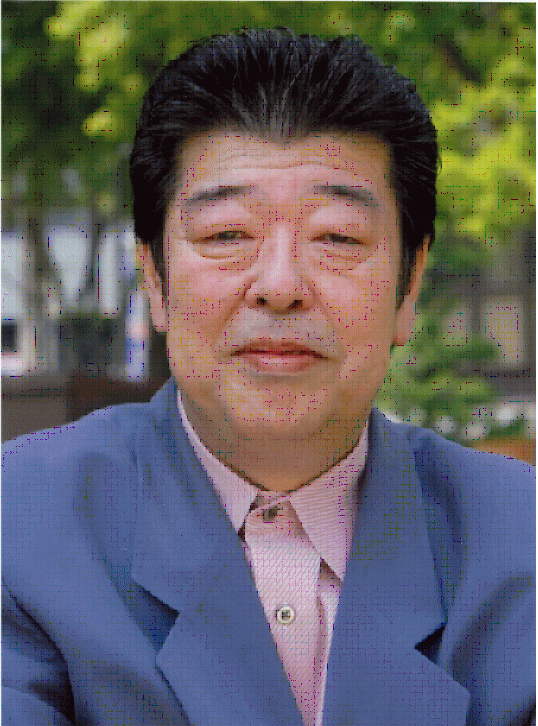
- Katsuhiko Takahashi in 2007
- Born: 6 August 1947 (age 79); Kamaishi, Iwate, Japan
- Occupation: Writer
- Writing career
- Language: Japanese
- Period: 1983–present
- Genres: Crime fiction, thriller, horror, science fiction, historical fiction
- Notable awards: Edogawa Rampo Prize (1983); Mystery Writers of Japan Award (1987); Naoki Prize (1991)

Katsuhiko Takahashi (高橋 克彦, Takahashi Katsuhiko; born 6 August 1947) is a Japanese writer of mystery, horror, science fiction and historical fiction. He is a member of the Mystery Writers of Japan.

== Works in English translation ==
Crime Novel

- The Case of the Sharaku Murders (original title: Sharaku Satsujin Jiken), trans. Ian Macdonald (Thames River Press, 2013)

Short horror story

- Reunion (original title: Daisuki na Ane), trans. Andrew Cunningham (Kaiki: Uncanny Tales from Japan, Volume 2: Country Delights, Kurodahan Press, 2010)

== Awards ==
- 1983 – Edogawa Rampo Prize: The Case of the Sharaku Murders
- 1986 – Yoshikawa Eiji Prize for New Writers: Sōmon-Dani (The Somon Valley)
- 1987 – Mystery Writers of Japan Award for Best Novel: Hokusai Satsujin Jiken (The Case of the Hokusai Murders)
- 1991 – Naoki Prize: Akai Kioku (The Scarlet Memories)
- 2000 – Yoshikawa Eiji Prize for Literature: Kaen (Flaming Rancor)
- 2011 – Japan Mystery Literature Award for Lifetime Achievement

== Main works ==
=== Ukiyo-e murder trilogy ===
- Sharaku Satsujin Jiken (写楽殺人事件), 1983 (The Case of the Sharaku Murders, Thames River Press, 2013)
- Hokusai Satsujin Jiken (北斎殺人事件), 1986 (The Case of the Hokusai Murders)
- Hiroshige Satsujin Jiken (広重殺人事件), 1989 (The Case of the Hiroshige Murders)

=== Detective Sotaro Toma series ===
- Novels
  - Utamaro Satsugan Jiken (歌麿殺贋事件), 1988 (The Case of the Utamaro Forgery Erasures)
  - Pandora Kēsu Yomigaeru Satsujin (パンドラ・ケース よみがえる殺人), 1988
  - Nanchō Meiro (南朝迷路), 1989 (Labyrinth of the Southern Court)
  - Miira no Satsujin (即身仏の殺人), 1990
  - Gohho Satsujin Jiken (ゴッホ殺人事件), 2002 (The Case of the Gogh Murders)
- Short story collection
  - Hokusai no Tsumi (北斎の罪), 1990 (Hokusai's Sin)

=== Standalone novels ===
- Rondon Ansatsu Tō (倫敦暗殺塔), 1985 (London's Tower of Murder)
- Gūjinkan no Satsujin (偶人館の殺人), 1990 (Murder at the Puppet Museum)
- Sōmondani (総門谷), 1985 (Sōmon Valley)

=== Memories series (horror novels) ===
- Akai Kioku (緋い記憶), 1991
- Zense no Kioku (前世の記憶), 1996
- Aoi Kioku (蒼い記憶), 2000

== See also ==
- Japanese detective fiction
