= Kazuaki Takano =

Japanese writer (born 1964)

- Born: 26 October 1964 (age 61); Tokyo
- Occupation: Writer
- Writing career
- Language: Japanese
- Period: 2001–present
- Genres: Crime fiction, thriller
- Notable awards: Edogawa Rampo Prize (2001); Mystery Writers of Japan Award (2012)

Kazuaki Takano (高野 和明, Takano Kazuaki; born October 26, 1964) is a Japanese writer of crime fiction and thrillers. He is a member of the Mystery Writers of Japan.

He worked for a time under the Japanese film director Kihachi Okamoto in his youth. After that he studied film at Los Angeles City College from 1989 to 1991.

His first novel Jūsan Kaidan (literally "Thirteen Steps", 2001) is a crime fiction novel which deals with the Japanese capital punishment system.

== Awards and nominations ==
- 2001 – Edogawa Rampo Prize: Jūsan Kaidan (Thirteen Steps)
- 2011 – Yamada Futaro Award: Genocide Of One
- 2011 – Nominee for Naoki Prize: Genocide Of One
- 2012 – The Best Japanese Crime Fiction of the Year (Kono Mystery ga Sugoi! 2012): Genocide Of One
- 2012 – Mystery Writers of Japan Award for Best Novel: Genocide Of One

== Bibliography ==
=== Standalone novels ===
- Jūsan Kaidan (13階段) (2001)
- Gureibu diggā (グレイヴディッガー) (2002)
- K N no Higeki (K・Nの悲劇) (2003)
- Yūrei Jinmei Kyūjotai (幽霊人命救助隊) (2004)
- Yume no Karute (夢のカルテ) (2005; co-authored with Hitoshi Sakagami)
- Jenosaido (ジェノサイド) (2011; translated by Philip Gabriel as Genocide Of One, Mulholland Books, 2014)

=== Short story collection ===
- Roku Jikango ni Kimi wa Shinu (6時間後に君は死ぬ), 2007

== TV and film adaptations ==
Japanese film

- Jūsan Kaidan (2003)

Japanese TV drama

- Roku Jikango ni Kimi wa Shinu (2008)

== See also ==
- Japanese detective fiction
