= Yoichi Funado =

Japanese writer (1944–2015)

- Born: Kenji Harada; February 8, 1944; Shimonoseki, Yamaguchi Prefecture, Japan
- Died: April 22, 2015 (aged 71); Suginami, Tokyo, Japan
- Education: Waseda University
- Writing career
- Period: 1979–2015
- Genres: Adventure fiction, spy fiction, hardboiled, thriller, historical fiction
- Notable work: May in the Valley of the Rainbow
- Notable awards: Mystery Writers of Japan Award (1989); Naoki Prize (2000)

Kenji Harada (原田建司, Harada Kenji; February 8, 1944 – April 22, 2015), known by his pen name Yoichi Funado (船戸与一, Funado Yoichi), was a Japanese writer of adventure fiction.

== Biography ==
Funado was born as Kenji Harada on February 8, 1944. During his student days, he traveled to Alaska. He graduated from Waseda University. Funado wrote approximately 30 stories for the manga series Golgo 13, three of which he later novelized in 2011.

Funado made his debut as an adventure novel writer in 1979. After writing some prize-winning adventure novels, in 2000 he won the Naoki Prize for his novel May in the Valley of the Rainbow. In February 2015, he published the last volume of his nine-volume novel series on the history of Manchukuo.

Funado died of thymic cancer on April 22, 2015, in Suginami, Tokyo.

== Works in English translation ==
- May in the Valley of the Rainbow (original title: Niji no Tani no Gogatsu), trans. Eve Nyren (Vertical, 2006)

== Awards ==
- Japan Adventure Fiction Association Prize
  - 1985 - Yamaneko no Natsu (Summer of the Wildcat)
  - 1988 - Takeki Hakobune
  - 1989 - Densetsu Naki Chi
  - 1992 - Suna no Kuronikuru (Sand Chronicle)
  - 1996 - Ezochi Bekken
  - 2004 - Yume wa Arechi o
- Other awards
  - 1985 - Yoshikawa Eiji Prize for New Writers: Yamaneko no Natsu (Summer of the Wildcat)
  - 1988 - The Best Japanese Crime Fiction of the Year (Kono Mystery ga Sugoi! 1988): Densetsu Naki Chi
  - 1989 - Mystery Writers of Japan Award for Best Novel: Densetsu Naki Chi
  - 1992 - Yamamoto Shūgorō Prize: Suna no Kuronikuru (Sand Chronicle)
  - 1993 - The Best Japanese Crime Fiction of the Year (Kono Mystery ga Sugoi! 1993): Suna no Kuronikuru (Sand Chronicle)
  - 2000 - Naoki Prize: May in the Valley of the Rainbow
  - 2014 - Japan Mystery Literature Award for Lifetime Achievement

== Main works ==
- Higōhōin (1979)
- Chi to Yume (1982)
- Yamaneko no Natsu (lit. Summer of the Wildcat) (1984)
- Takeki Hakobune (1987)
- Densetsu Naki Chi (1988)
- Midori no Soko no Soko (1989)
- Suna no Kuronikuru (lit. Sand Chronicle) (1991)
- Ezochi Bekken (1995)
- Niji no Tani no Gogatsu (2000) (May in the Valley of the Rainbow. Vertical. 2006) ISBN 978-1-93223-428-2
- Yume wa Arechi o (2003)
- Kahan ni Shirube Naku (lit. No Sign on the Riverside) (2006)
- Manshukoku Engi (2007–2015) (nine volumes)
