= Koji Yanagi =

Japanese writer of mystery and thriller (born 1967)

- Born: September 20, 1967 (age 58); Mie Prefecture, Japan
- Occupation: Writer
- Writing career
- Language: Japanese
- Period: 2001–present
- Genres: Mystery, thriller
- Notable work: Joker Game series
- Notable awards: Mystery Writers of Japan Award (2009)

Koji Yanagi (柳広司, Yanagi Kōji; born September 20, 1967) is a Japanese writer of mystery and thriller. He is a member of the Mystery Writers of Japan.

== Awards and nominations ==
- 2001 – Asahi Award for New Writers: Gansaku "Botchan" Satsujin Jiken (A "Botchan" Parody Murder Mystery)
- 2007 – Nominee for Mystery Writers of Japan Award for Best Novel or Linked Short Stories: Tokyo Prison
- 2009 – Mystery Writers of Japan Award for Best Novel or Linked Short Stories: Joker Game
- 2009 – Yoshikawa Eiji Prize for New Writers: Joker Game
- 2009 – Nominee for Haruhiko Oyabu Prize: Joker Game
- 2014 – Nominee for Yamada Futaro Prize: Knight and Shadow

== Bibliography ==
=== Joker Game series (aka D Agency series) ===
Each book includes three to six short stories.

1. Joker Game (ジョーカー・ゲーム), 2008
2. Double Joker (ダブル・ジョーカー), 2009
3. Paradise Lost (パラダイス・ロスト), 2012
4. Last Waltz (ラスト・ワルツ), 2015

=== Standalone novels ===
- Ogon no Hai (黄金の灰), 2001 (The Golden Ash)
- Gansaku "Botchan" Satsujin Jiken (贋作『坊っちゃん』殺人事件), 2001 (A "Botchan" Parody Murder Mystery)
- Shunposhion: Sokuratesu Saigo no Jiken (饗宴 ソクラテス最後の事件), 2001 (Symposium: The Last Case of Socrates)
- Hajimari no Shima (はじまりの島), 2002 (The First Island)
- Shinsekai (新世界), 2003 (New World)
- Zabieru no Kubi (ザビエルの首), 2004 (Xavier's Head)
- Wagahai wa Sharokku Homuzu de aru (吾輩はシャーロック・ホームズである), 2005 (I am Sherlock Holmes)
- Tokyo Purizun (トーキョー・プリズン), 2006 (Tokyo Prizon)
- Tora to Tsuki (虎と月), 2009 (Tiger and the Moon)
- Kingu ando Kuin (キング&クイーン), 2010 (Kind and Queen)
- Saisho no Tetsugakusha (最初の哲学者), 2010 (The First Philosopher)
- Romansu (ロマンス), 2011 (Romance)
- Rakuen no Cho (楽園の蝶), 2013 (Butterfly in Paradise)
- Naito ando Shadou (ナイト&シャドウ), 2014 (Knight and Shadow)
- Sokuratesu no Tsuma (ソクラテスの妻), 2014 (The Wife of Socrates)

=== Short story collections ===
- Parutenon (パルテノン), 2004 (Parthenon)
- Shiton Tantei Dobutsuki (シートン（探偵）動物記), 2006 (Detective Seton Animal Chronicles)
- Hyakuman no Maruko (百万のマルコ), 2007 (Marco The Million)
- Soseki Sensei no Jikenbo: Neko no Maki (漱石先生の事件簿 猫の巻), 2007 (The Case-Book of Soseki)
- Kaidan (怪談), 2011 (Kaidan)

== See also ==
- Japanese detective fiction
