= Joh Sasaki =

Japanese writer and journalist (born 1950)

- Born: March 16, 1950 (age 76); Yubari, Hokkaido
- Occupations: Writer, novelist, journalist
- Writing career
- Period: 1979 –
- Genres: Historical fiction, crime fiction, adventure, mystery, suspense, young adult fiction
- Notable works: Etorofu hatsu kinkyūden (1989); Keikan no chi(2007)
- Notable awards: Naoki Prize(2009)
- Website: www.sasakijo.com

Joh Sasaki (佐々木 譲, Sasaki Jō; born March 16, 1950) is a Japanese writer and journalist, chiefly known for his historical fiction and mystery novels.

== Biography ==
Joh Sasaki was born in Yubari, Hokkaido, Japan. He spent his early youth in Nakashibetsu City and later moved to Sapporo where he attended Tsukisamu High School. He released his first novel, Tekkihei, tonda (鉄騎兵、跳んだ), in 1979. Sasaki quickly established himself as a writer after winning the All Yomimono New Writers Prize for Tekkihei, tonda, which was also later adapted for the big screen. Today Sasaki is very widely known, and has written numerous works in genres including historical fiction, young adult fiction and police crime fiction, as well as TV crime drama adaptations.

In 2009, Sasaki won Japan's number one literary award, the Naoki Prize, for his work ja:廃墟に乞う Haikyo ni kou, and also holds many other literary awards. These days Sasaki is actively developing his stories for the stage in addition to directing a children's e-picture book project called Joh's Picture Book Project.

== Literary style ==
Joh Sasaki is well known in Japan as a social entertainment writer. In his novel ja:真夜中の遠い彼方 Mayonaka no tooi kanata (later re-titled to ja:新宿のありふれた夜 Shinjuku no arifureta yoru), he depicts the underground lifestyles of the Japanese mafia, boat people, and illegal alien workers. In ja:夜にその名を呼べば Yoru ni sono na o yobeba, Sasaki portrays a chilling Cold War scene in a mystery set in Otaru, Hokkaido and Berlin, Germany. His police mystery thriller, ja:歌う警官 Utau keikan (later re-titled to ja:笑う警官 Warau keikan) was adapted for the big screen and provides an early setting for his later internationally acclaimed roman-fleuve novel ja:警官の血 Keikan no chi which was eventually adapted for television. Sasaki's ja:ベルリン飛行指令 Berlin hikō shimei (English title: Zero Over Berlin) garnered critical acclaim for telling a World War II story from the Japanese perspective; it focuses on a fly-by-night mission involving a Type Zero Fighter (Mitsubishi A6M Zero) secretly making its way from Japan all the way to Berlin at the request of the Luftwaffe. Zero Over Berlin is presently Sasaki's only novel translated into English.

== Works in English translation ==
- Zero Over Berlin (original title: Berlin Hikō Shirei): Vertical, 2004 (Translated by Hiroko Yoda with Matt Alt).

== Awards ==
- 1979 ja:鉄騎兵、跳んだ Tekkihei, tonda: debut novel winning the All Yomimono New Writers Prize.
- 1989 ja:エトロフ発緊急電 Etorofu hatsu kinkyūden: novel winning the Mystery Writers of Japan Award, Yamamoto Shūgorō Prize and Japan Adventure Fiction Association Prize.
- 1994 ja:ストックホルムの密使 Stockholm no misshi: novel winning the Japan Adventure Fiction Association Prize.
- 2002 ja:武揚伝 Buyōden: novel winning the Nitta Jirō Prize for Literature.
- 2008 ja:警官の血 Keikan no chi (The Policeman's Lineage): novel winning the first place in the "Kono Mystery ga Sugoi! 2008" and the Japan Adventure Fiction Association Prize.
- 2009 ja:廃墟に乞う Haikyo ni kou (Prayer in the Ruins): novel winning the nationally acclaimed literary award Naoki Prize.

== Bibliography ==
=== Adventure novels ===
==== World War II ====
- World War II Trilogy Series
  - ja:ベルリン飛行指令 Berlin Hikō Shirei (Shincho Bunko, 1988., Shincho Bunko, 1993)
    - Manga adaptation by ja:望月三起也 Mochitzuki Mikiya
  - ja:エトロフ発緊急電 Etorofu Hatsu Kinkyūden (Shincho Bunko, 1989., Shincho Bunko, 1994., Futabasa, 2004)
    - TV drama adaptation: ja:エトロフ遥かなり Etorofu Harukanari
  - ja:ストックホルムの密使 Stockholm no Misshi (Shincho Bunko, 1994., Shincho Bunko, 1997)
- ja:ワシントン封印工作 Washington Fūin Kōsaku (Shincho Bunko, 1997., Shincho Bunko, 2000., Bunshu bunko, 2010)

==== Historical fiction novels ====
- Ezochi (Hokkaido) Trilogy Series
  - ja:五稜郭残党伝 Goryōkaku Zantōden (Shūeisha Bunko, 1991., Shūeisha Bunko, 1994)
  - ja:雪よ荒野よ Yuki yo Kōya yo (Shūeisha Bunko, 1994., Shūeisha Bunko, 1997)
  - ja:北辰群盗録 Hokushingun Tōroku (Shūeisha Bunko, 1996., Shūeisha Bunko, 1999)
- Bakumatsu Trilogy Series
  - ja:武揚伝 Buyōden (Chuokoron-Shinsha, Inc., 2001., Nakakou Bunko, 2003)
  - ja:くろふね Kuro Fune (Kadokawa Shoten, 2003., Kadokawa Shoten, 2008)
  - ja:英龍伝 Eiryūden (Nikkei Masuta-zu Rensai Mikanko)
- ja:駿女 Shunme (Chuokoron-Shinsha, Inc., 2005., Nakakou Bunko, 2008)

=== Current works ===
==== Police crime fiction ====
- ja:道警シリーズ Dōkei Series
  - ja:うたう警官 Warau Keikan (Kadokawashunki Jimusho, 2004)
    - Revised: ja:笑う警官 Warau Keikan (Haruki Bunko, 2007)
    - TV drama adaptation: ja:笑う警官 Warau Keikan (2009)
  - ja:警察庁から来た男 Keisatsuchō kara Kita Otoko Kadokawashunki Jimusho, 2006., Haruki bunko, 2008)
  - ja:警官の紋章 Keikan no Monshō (Kadokawashunki Jimusho., 2008., Haruki Bunko, 2010)
  - ja:巡査の休日 Junsa no Kyūjitsu (Kadokawashunki Jimusho., 2009., Haruki Bunko, 2011)
    - TV drama adaptation: ja:巡査の休日 Junsa no Kyūjitsu: (2011)
  - ja:密売人 Mitsubainin (Kadokawashunki Jimusho., 2011)
- ja:駐在警官・川久保篤シリーズ Chūzai Keikan Series
  - ja:制服捜査 Seifuku Sōsa (Shinchō Bunko, 2006., Shinchō Bunko 2009)
  - ja:暴雪圏 Bōsetsuken (Shinchō Bunko, 2009)
- ja:警官の血 Keikan no Chi (Shinchō Bunko, 2007., Shinchō Bunko, 2010)
  - TV drama adaptation: ja:警官の血 Keikan no Chi (2009)
- ja:廃墟に乞う Haikyo ni Kou (Bungeishunju Ltd., 2009)

==== Suspense novels ====
- ja:真夜中の遠い彼方 Mayonaka no Tooi Kanata (Daiwa shobō, 1984., Shūeisha Bunko, 1987., Tenzan bunko., 1992).
  - Revised: ja:新宿のありふれた夜 Shinjuku no Arifureta Yoru (Sukora Noberuzu, 1996., Kadokawa bunko, 1997）
  - Movie title: Ware ni Utsu Yōi Ari Ready to Shoot (Fusosha Publishing, 1990)

==== Young adult fiction and other novels ====
- ja:鉄騎兵、跳んだ Tekkihei, Tonda (Bungeishunju Ltd., 1980,. Tokuma Shoten Publishing Co., Ltd., 1986,. Bunshun Bunko, 2010)
  - Movie title: ja:鉄騎兵、跳んだ Tekkihei, Tonda (starring Junichi Ishida)
- ja:いつか風が見ていた Itsuka Kaze ga Miteita (CBS Sony, 1985)
  - Revised: ja:タイム・アタック Taimu Atakku (Shūeisha Bunko, 1988)
- ja:マンハッタンの美徳 Manhattan no Bitoku (Shūeisha Bunko, 1989)
- ja:サンクスギビング・ママ Sankusugibingu Mama (Switch Publishing Co., Ltd., 1992,. Shinchosha, 1995., Fusosha Bunko, 2008)
- ja:きょうも舗道にすれちがう Kyō mo Hodō ni Surechigau (Chuokoron-Shinsha, Inc., 1994,. Nakakou bunko, 2000)

==== Horror novels ====
- ja:死の色の封印 Shi no Iro no Fūin (Tokumanoberuzsu, 1984., Tokuma Shoten Publishing Co., Ltd., 1989)
- ja:白い殺戮者 Shiroi Sakurikusha (Tokumanoberusu, 1986., Tokuma Shoten Publishing Co., Ltd., 1991)
- ja:牙のある時間 Kiba no Aru Jikan (Magajinhausu, 1998., Haruki Bunko, 2000)

==== Other novels ====
- ja:ユニット Yunitto (Bungeishunju Ltd., 2003., Bunshu Bunko, 2005)
  - TV drama adaptation: ja:ユニット Yunitto (2006)
- ja:カウントダウン Countdown (Mainichi Shinbunsha, 2010)
- ja:地層捜査 Chisō Shinsa (Bungeishunju, 2012)

=== Non-fiction ===
- ja:冒険者カストロ Bōkensha kasutoro (Shūeisha Bunko, 2002., Shūeisha Bunko, 2005)
- ja:幕臣たちと技術立国 Bakushintachi to Gijutsu Rikkoku (Shūeisha Shinsho, 2006)
- ja:わが夕張 わがエトロフ Wa ga Yūbari waga Etorofu (Hokkaido Shinbunsha, 2008)
