= Arimasa Osawa =

Japanese writer of hardboiled fiction

- Born: 8 March 1956 (age 70); Nagoya, Japan
- Occupation: Writer
- Writing career
- Language: Japanese
- Period: 1978–present
- Genres: Hardboiled, crime fiction, thriller
- Notable awards: Mystery Writers of Japan Award (1991); Naoki Prize (1993)
- Website: www.osawa-office.co.jp/write/osawa.html

Arimasa Osawa (大沢在昌, Ōsawa Arimasa; born 8 March 1956) is a Japanese writer of hardboiled fiction and thrillers. He served as the 12th President of the Mystery Writers of Japan from 2005 to 2009.

== Works in English translation ==
Detective Samejima series (Shinjuku Shark series)

- Shinjuku Shark (original title: Shinjuku-Zame), trans. Andrew Clare (Vertical, 2007)
- The Poison Ape: A Shinjuku Shark Novel (original title: Dokuzaru: Shinjuku-Zame 2), trans. Deborah Iwabuchi (Vertical, 2008)

"Same" or "zame" means "shark" in English.

Essay

- My Favourite Mystery, "The Darkest Hour" by William P. McGivern (Mystery Writers of Japan, Inc. )

== Awards ==
- 1978 – Shosetsu Suiri New Writers Prize: Kanshō no Machikado (Sentimental Streets) (short story)
- 1991 – Mystery Writers of Japan Award for Best Novel: Shinjuku Shark
- 1991 – Yoshikawa Eiji Prize for New Writers: Shinjuku Shark
- 1991 – The Best Japanese Crime Fiction of the Year (Kono Mystery ga Sugoi! 1991): Shinjuku Shark
- 1993 – Naoki Prize: Mugen Ningyō: Shinjuku-Zame 4 (Poisoning Doll: Shinjuku Shark 4)
- 2000 – Japan Adventure Fiction Association Prize: Kokoro de wa Omosugiru (The Heart Is Too Heavy)
- 2001 – Japan Adventure Fiction Association Prize: Yamisaki Annainin (Guide into Darkness)
- 2004 – Shibata Renzaburo Prize: Pandora Airando (Pandora Island)
- 2006 – Japan Adventure Fiction Association Prize: Ōkami-Bana: Shinjuku-Zame 9 (The Werewolf: Shinjuku Shark 9)
- 2010 – Japan Mystery Literature Award for Lifetime Achievement
- 2011 – Japan Adventure Fiction Association Prize: Kizuna Kairō: Shinjuku-Zame 10 (Ties That Bind: Shinjuku Shark 10)

== Main works ==
=== Private detective Ko Sakuma series ===
- Novels
  - Hyōteki Sōro (標的走路), 1980
  - Tsuisekisha no Kettō (追跡者の血統), 1986
  - Yukihotaru (雪蛍), 1996
  - Kokoro de wa Omosugiru (心では重すぎる), 2000
- Short story collections
  - Kanshō no Machikado (感傷の街角), 1982
  - Hyōhaku no Machikado (漂泊の街角), 1985

=== Arbeit detective series ===
1. Arubaito Ai (アルバイト探偵), 1986 (short story collection)
2. Arubaito Ai: Chōdokushi o Sagase (アルバイト探偵 調毒師を捜せ), 1987 (novel)
3. Joō-heika no Arubaito Ai (女王陛下のアルバイト探偵), 1988 (novel)
4. Fushigi no Kuni no Arubaito Ai (不思議の国のアルバイト探偵), 1989 (novel)
5. Arubaito Ai: Gōmon Yūenchi (アルバイト探偵 拷問遊園地), 1991 (novel)
6. Kaette kita Arubaito Ai (帰ってきたアルバイト探偵), 2004 (novel)

=== Detective Samejima series (Shinjuku Shark series) ===
- Novels
  1. Shinjuku-Zame (新宿鮫), 1990 (Shinjuku Shark, Vertical, 2007)
  2. Doku-Zaru: Shinjuku-Zame 2 (毒猿 新宿鮫II), 1991 (The Poison Ape, Vertical, 2008)
  3. Shikabane Ran: Shinjuku-Zame 3 (屍蘭 新宿鮫III), 1993
  4. Mugen Ningyō: Shinjuku-Zame 4 (無間人形 新宿鮫IV), 1993
  5. Honō Sanagi: Shinjuku-Zame 5 (炎蛹 新宿鮫V), 1995
  6. Kōri Mai: Shinjuku-Zame 6 (氷舞 新宿鮫VI), 1997
  7. Haiya: Shinjuku-Zame 7 (灰夜 新宿鮫VII), 2001
  8. Fūka Suimyaku: Shinjuku-Zame 8 (風化水脈 新宿鮫VIII), 2000
  9. Ōkami-Bana: Shinjuku-Zame 9 (狼花 新宿鮫IX), 2006
  10. Kizuna Kairō: Shinjuku-Zame 10 (絆回廊 新宿鮫X), 2011
- Short story collection
  - Samejima no Kao: Shinjuku-Zame Tampenshū (鮫島の貌 新宿鮫短編集), 2012

=== Standalone novels ===
- Yamisaki Annainin (闇先案内人), 2001
- Pandora Airando [Pandora Island] (パンドラ・アイランド), 2004

== See also ==
- Japanese detective fiction
- Tozai Mystery Best 100
