= Mikihiko Renjō =

Japanese writer (1948–2013)

- Born: Jingo Katō; January 11, 1948; Nagoya, Aichi Prefecture, Japan
- Died: October 19, 2013 (aged 65); Nagoya, Aichi Prefecture
- Education: Waseda University, Political Economy Department
- Occupation: Writer
- Writing career
- Language: Japanese
- Period: 1978–2013
- Genres: Popular fiction, mystery novels
- Notable works: Modorigawa shinjū, Koibumi, Ningen dõbutsuen
- Notable awards: Mystery Writers of Japan Award (1981); Naoki Prize (1984)

Mikihiko Renjō (連城 三紀彦, Renjō Mikihiko; real name: Jingo Katō; January 11, 1948 – October 19, 2013) was a Japanese writer, winner of the Naoki Prize. He was also an ordained priest within the Ōtani-ha branch of Jōdo Shinshū Buddhism.

== Life ==
He was born in Nagoya, and graduated from the Political Economy Department of Waseda University. He studied writing screenplays in Paris, France, and made his debut in 1978 with Henchō nininbaori. In 2009 he was diagnosed with stomach cancer. He died, after the cancer also spread to the liver, on October 19, 2013.

== Awards ==
- 1978 – Gen'eijō New Writers Award for "Henchō Nininbaori" (short story)
- 1981 – Mystery Writers of Japan Award for Best Short Story for "Modorigawa Shinjū"
- 1984 – Yoshikawa Eiji Prize for New Writers for Yoimachigusa Yojō (short story collection)
- 1984 – Naoki Prize for Koibumi (short story collection)
- 1996 – Shibata Renzaburō Award for Kakuregiku (novel)

== Bibliography ==
=== Novels ===
- Anshoku Komedi (暗色コメディ), 1979
- Haiboku e no Gaisen (敗北への凱旋), 1983
- Watashi to iu Na no Hensokyoku (私という名の変奏曲), 1984
- Zanko (残紅), 1985
- Aoki Ikenie (青き犠牲), 1986
- Hana Ochiru (花墜ちる), 1987
- Tasogare no Berurin (黄昏のベルリン), 1988
- Ajisai Zensen (あじさい前線), 1989
- Kazari-Bi (飾り火), 1989
- Doko made mo Korosarete (どこまでも殺されて), 1990
- Kasshoku no Matsuri (褐色の祭り), 1990
- Tameiki no Jikan (ため息の時間), 1991
- Bi no Kami tachi no Hanran (美の神たちの叛乱), 1992
- Aijo no Genkai (愛情の限界), 1993
- Asu to iu Kako ni (明日という過去に), 1993
- Oushi no Yawaraka na Niku (牡牛の柔らかな肉), 1993
- Shusho kara no Onna (終章からの女), 1994
- Kajin (花塵), 1994
- Koi (恋), 1995
- Dare ka Hiroin (誰かヒロイン), 1995
- Kakuregiku (隠れ菊), 1996
- Niji no Hachi ban me no Iro (虹の八番目の色), 1996
- Hika (秘花), 2000
- Yukizuri no Kuchibiru (ゆきずりの唇), 2000
- Byakko (白光), 2002
- Ningen Dōbutsuen (人間動物園), 2002
- Nagareboshi to Asonda Koro (流れ星と遊んだころ), 2003
- Zōka no Mitsu (造花の蜜), 2008

=== Short story collections ===
- Modorigawa Shinjū (戻り川心中), 1980
- Henchō Nininbaori (変調二人羽織), 1981
- Hisoyaka na Mofuku (密やかな喪服), 1982
- Yoru yo Nezumi tachi no Tame ni (夜よ鼠たちのために), 1983
- Unmei no Hachibukyufu (運命の八分休符), 1983
- Yoimachigusa Yojo (宵待草夜情), 1983
- Koibumi (恋文), 1984
- Shojo (少女), 1984
- Gasuto (瓦斯灯), 1984
- Yuhagi Shinjū (夕萩心中), 1985
- Nichiyobi to Kokonotsu no Tanpen (日曜日と九つの短篇), 1985
- Mo Hitotsu no Koibumi (もうひとつの恋文), 1986
- Rikon Shinai Onna (離婚しない女), 1986
- Ren'ai Shosetsukan (恋愛小説館), 1987
- Hotarugusa (蛍草), 1988
- Ichiya no Kushi (一夜の櫛), 1988
- Yumegokoro (夢ごころ), 1988
- Tasogareiro no Bisho (たそがれ色の微笑), 1989
- Hagi no Ame (萩の雨), 1989
- Yoru no Nai Mado (夜のない窓), 1990
- Shin Ren'ai Shosetsukan (新・恋愛小説館), 1991
- Rakujitsu no Mon (落日の門), 1993
- Kao no Nai Shozoga (顔のない肖像画), 1993
- Senaka Awase (背中合わせ), 1993
- Murasaki no Kizu (紫の傷), 1994
- Zen'yasai (前夜祭), 1994
- Bijo (美女), 1997
- Toshiue no Onna (年上の女), 1997
- Karen (火恋), 1999
- Natsu no Saigo no Bara (夏の最後の薔薇), 2001
- Sazanami no Ie (さざなみの家), 2002

== Film adaptations ==
Many of his writings have been made into movies.

- Love Letter (Koibumi)
