= Mystery Writers of Japan =

Organization for mystery writers in Japan

Mystery Writers of Japan (Japanese: 日本推理作家協会, Hepburn: Nihon Suiri Sakka Kyōkai) is an organization for mystery writers in Japan.

The organization was founded on 21 June 1947 by Edogawa Rampo. It is currently chaired by Natsuhiko Kyogoku and claims about 600 members.

It presents the Mystery Writers of Japan Award to writers every year. It also presents the Edogawa Rampo Prize to amateur writers who has had few or no novels published commercially.

== History ==
On 21 June 1947, Edogawa Rampo founded the Detective Fiction Writers Club (探偵作家クラブ, Tantei Sakka Kurabu), which was based in Tokyo. In 1954, the Club merged with the Detective Fiction Writers Club of Kansai (関西探偵作家クラブ, Kansai Tantei Sakka Kurabu), the counterpart based in Kansai region, and changed its name to the Detective Fiction Writers Club of Japan (日本探偵作家クラブ, Nihon Tantei Sakka Kurabu). On 31 January 1963, the club changed its name to Mystery Writers of Japan (日本推理作家協会, Nihon Suiri Sakka Kyōkai).

== Awards ==
The MWJ presents two annual awards.

- Mystery Writers of Japan Award (since 1948)
  - Best Novel
  - Best Short Story
  - Best Critical/Biographical Work
- Edogawa Rampo Prize (since 1955): sponsored by Kodansha and Fuji Television, open to anyone who has had few or no novels published commercially. The winner receives a small bust of Edogawa Rampo and a prize of 10,000,000 yen. The novel of the winner is published by Kodansha. The members of the selection committee of 2012 are Natsuo Kirino, Natsuhiko Kyogoku, Ira Ishida, Bin Konno (ja) and Keigo Higashino.

== Presidents ==
- Detective Fiction Writers Club (of Japan)
  1. Edogawa Rampo (1947–1952)
  2. Udaru Oshita (1952–1954)
  3. Takataro Kigi (1954–1960)
  4. Keisuke Watanabe (1960–1963)
- Mystery Writers of Japan
  1. Edogawa Rampo (1963)
  2. Seichō Matsumoto (1963–1971)
  3. Kazuo Shimada (1971–1973)
  4. Yo Sano (1973–1979)
  5. Toru Miyoshi (writer) (1979–1981)
  6. Masao Yamamura (1981–1985)
  7. Kawataro Nakajima (1985–1989)
  8. Jiro Ikushima (1989–1993)
  9. Takashi Atoda (1993–1997)
  10. Kenzo Kitakata (1997–2001)
  11. Go Osaka (2001–2005)
  12. Arimasa Osawa (2005–2009)
  13. Keigo Higashino (2009–2013)
  14. Bin Konno (2013–2019)
  15. Natsuhiko Kyogoku (2019–2023)
  16. Tokuro Nukui (2023– )

== Anthologies ==
The MWJ started compiling the annual anthology of members in 1948.

- The Best Mysteries 2001 (Kodansha, Tokyo, 2001, ISBN 4-06-114902-4)
- The Best Mysteries 2002 (Kodansha, Tokyo, 2002, ISBN 4-06-114903-2)
- The Best Mysteries 2003 (Kodansha, Tokyo, 2003, ISBN 4-06-114904-0)
- The Best Mysteries 2004 (Kodansha, Tokyo, 2004, ISBN 4-06-114905-9)
- The Best Mysteries 2005 (Kodansha, Tokyo, 2005, ISBN 4-06-114906-7)
- The Best Mysteries 2006 (Kodansha, Tokyo, 2006, ISBN 4-06-114907-5)
- The Best Mysteries 2007 (Kodansha, Tokyo, 2007, ISBN 978-4-06-114908-3)
- The Best Mysteries 2008 (Kodansha, Tokyo, 2008, ISBN 978-4-06-114909-0)
- The Best Mysteries 2009 (Kodansha, Tokyo, 2009, ISBN 978-4-06-114910-6)
- The Best Mysteries 2010 (Kodansha, Tokyo, 2010, ISBN 978-4-06-114911-3)
- The Best Mysteries 2011 (Kodansha, Tokyo, 2011, ISBN 978-4-06-114912-0)
- The Best Mysteries 2012 (Kodansha, Tokyo, 2012, ISBN 978-4-06-114913-7)

== See also ==
- Japanese detective fiction
- Mystery Writers of America
- Crime Writers' Association
- Honkaku Mystery Writers Club of Japan
