= Go Osaka =

Japanese writer

- Born: 1 November 1943 (age 82); Bunkyo, Tokyo, Japan
- Occupation: Writer
- Writing career
- Language: Japanese
- Period: 1980–present
- Genres: Crime fiction, hardboiled, thriller, spy fiction, western fiction
- Notable work: The Red Star of Cádiz
- Notable awards: Mystery Writers of Japan Award (1987); Naoki Prize (1987)

Go Osaka (逢坂 剛, Ōsaka Gō; born 1 November 1943) is a Japanese writer of crime fiction, hardboiled, thriller, spy fiction and western fiction. He served as the 11th President of the Mystery Writers of Japan from 2001 to 2005. Outside of his literary works, he is also known for his interest in Flamenco music. He is a competent guitarist in his own right and has several guitars around his office.

== Works in English translation ==
Thriller Novel

- The Red Star of Cádiz (original title: Kadisu no Akai Hoshi), trans. Usha Jayaraman (Kurodahan Press, 2008)

Essay

- My Favourite Mystery, "The Hollow Needle" by Maurice Leblanc (Mystery Writers of Japan, Inc. )

== Awards ==
- 1980 – All Yomimono Prize for New Mystery Writers: Ansatsusha Guranada ni Shisu (The Assassin is Dead in Granada) (Short story)
- 1986 – Japan Adventure Fiction Association Prize: The Red Star of Cádiz
- 1987 – Mystery Writers of Japan Award for Best Novel: The Red Star of Cádiz
- 1987 – Naoki Prize: The Red Star of Cádiz
- 2013 – Japan Mystery Literature Award for Lifetime Achievement

== Main works ==
=== Shrike the Killer series ===
- Mozu no Sakebu Yoru (百舌の叫ぶ夜), 1986
- Maboroshi no Tsubasa (幻の翼), 1988
- Kudakareta Kagi (砕かれた鍵), 1992
- Yomigaeru Mozu (よみがえる百舌), 1996
- Nosuri no Su (鵟の巣), 2002

=== Private detective Shinsaku Okasaka series ===
- Novels
  - Jūjiro ni Tatsu Onna (十字路に立つ女), 1989
  - Adeyakana Rakujitsu (あでやかな落日), 1997
  - Kiba o Muku Tokai (牙をむく都会), 2000
  - Boseki no Densetsu (墓石の伝説), 2004
  - Bakkusutorīto [Back street] (バックストリート), 2013
- Short story collections
  - Kurivitsukī Shōkōgun (クリヴィツキー症候群), 1987
  - Hapon Tsuiseki (ハポン追跡), 1992
  - Kapugura no Akumu (カプグラの悪夢), 1998

=== Detective Vulture series ===
- Hagetaka no Yoru (禿鷹の夜), 2000
- Mubōbi Toshi (無防備都市), 2002
- Gindan no Mori (銀弾の森), 2003
- Hagetaka-Gari (禿鷹狩り), 2006
- Kyōdan (兇弾), 2010

=== Iberian Peninsula series ===
Espionage novels set in Iberian Peninsula during World War II.

- Iberia no Raimei (イベリアの雷鳴), 1999
- Tōzakaru Sokoku (遠ざかる祖国), 2001
- Moeru Shinkirō (燃える蜃気楼), 2003
- Kurai Kokkyōsen (暗い国境線), 2005
- Tozasareta Kaikyō (鎖された海峡), 2008
- Ansatsusha no Mori (暗殺者の森), 2010

=== Standalone thriller novels ===
- Uragiri no Hibi (裏切りの日日), 1981
- Supein Shakunetsu no Gogo (スペイン灼熱の午後), 1984
- Kadisu no Akai Hoshi (カディスの赤い星), 1986 (The Red Star of Cádiz, Kurodahan Press, 2008)
- Samayoeru Nōzui (さまよえる脳髄), 1988
- Shaei Harukana Kuni (斜影はるかな国), 1991 (Shadow of a Distant Land)
- Maboroshi no Saiten (幻の祭典), 1993
- Moeru Chi no Hate ni (燃える地の果てに), 1998
- Atsuki Chi no Hokori (熱き血の誇り), 1999

=== Western novels ===
- Arizona Mushuku (アリゾナ無宿), 2002
- Gyakushū no Chiheisen (逆襲の地平線), 2005

== See also ==
- Japanese detective fiction
