= Kaoru Takamura =

Japanese writer (born 1953)

- 髙村 薫
- Born: 1953 (age 72–73); Osaka, Japan
- Education: International Christian University
- Occupation: Writer
- Writing career
- Language: Japanese
- Genres: Fiction; Mystery fiction; Essay
- Notable works: Ōgon o daite tobe; Riviera o ute; Māksu no yama; Taiyō o hiku uma; Tsuchi no ki
- Notable awards: Mystery Writers of Japan Award; Japan Adventure Fiction Association Prize; Naoki Prize; Yomiuri Prize; Noma Literary Prize

Kaoru Takamura (髙村 薫, Takamura Kaoru; born 1953) is a Japanese writer from Osaka. She has won numerous Japanese literary awards, including the Mystery Writers of Japan Award, the Japan Adventure Fiction Association Prize, the Naoki Prize, the Yomiuri Prize, and the Noma Literary Prize, and her work has been adapted for film and television.

== Early life and education ==
Takamura was born in Osaka in 1953. After graduating from International Christian University, she worked for a trading company, and did not start writing until her 30s.

== Career ==
Takamura's first novel, Ōgon o daite tobe (黄金を抱いて翔ベ, Grab the Money and Run), was published in 1990 and won the Japan Mystery and Suspense Grand Prize. Two years later her novel Riviera o ute (リヴィエラを撃て, Shoot Riviera), a thriller about an Irish man mysteriously murdered in Tokyo as part of an apparent international espionage plot, was published, winning both the Mystery Writers of Japan Award and the Japan Adventure Fiction Association Prize. Ōgon o daite tobe was later adapted into the 2012 Kazuyuki Izutsu film of the same name, starring Satoshi Tsumabuki and Tadanobu Asano.

In 1993 Takamura's mystery novel Mākusu no yama (マークスの山, Marks' Mountain), about a boy who survives his parents' suicide and grows up to be a psychopathic serial killer, won the Naoki Prize as well as Takamura's second consecutive Japan Adventure Fiction Association Prize. The book sold more than a million copies. It was later adapted into a 1995 Yoichi Sai film and a 2010 Wowow television drama. By the mid-1990s Takamura was seen as the "Queen of Mysteries", but in 1997, after completing a fictionalized account of the Glico Morinaga case titled Redi joka (レディ・ジョーカー, Lady Joker), she changed the focus of her writing from mystery novels to literary fiction. Lady Joker was later adapted into the 2004 Hideyuki Hirayama film Lady Joker and a 2013 Wowow television drama.

Takamura subsequently published a trilogy of novels about the lives of four generations of a conservative political family, starting with Haruko jōka (晴子情歌, Haruko's Love Song) in 2002, continuing with Shin Ria-ō (新リア王, A New King Lear) in 2005, and concluding with Taiyō o hiku uma (太陽を曳く馬, The Horse that Pulls the Sun) in 2009. Shin Ria-ō won the Shinran Prize, and Taiyō o hiku uma won the Yomiuri Prize. In 2016 she published the novel Tsuchi no ki (土の記, Working the Earth), about an elderly farmer coping with the death of his wife, alienation from his daughter, and disruption caused by the 2011 Tōhoku earthquake and tsunami. Tsuchi no ki won the 70th Noma Literary Prize, the 44th Jirō Osagari Prize, and a Mainichi Arts Award.

== Writing style ==
Takamura's fiction focuses especially on the psychological aspects of her characters. She also addresses larger contemporary social issues, both in her novels and in the nonfiction essays and commentary that she writes for newspapers and magazines.

== Recognition ==
- 1992: 46th Mystery Writers of Japan Award
- 1992: 11th Japan Adventure Fiction Association Prize
- 1993: 109th Naoki Prize (1993上)
- 1993: 12th Japan Adventure Fiction Association Prize
- 2006: 4th Shinran Prize
- 2009: 61st Yomiuri Prize
- 2017: 70th Noma Literary Prize
- 2017: 44th Jirō Osagari Prize
- 2018: 59th Mainichi Arts Award

== Film and other adaptations ==
=== Film ===
- Marks no yama, 1995
- Lady Joker, 2004

=== Television ===
- Marks no yama (Wowow, 2010)
- Lady Joker (Wowow, 2013)

== Works ==
- Ōgon o daite tobe (黄金を抱いて翔ベ, Grab the Money and Run), 1990, Shinchosha, ISBN 9784103784012
- Riviera o ute (リヴィエラを撃て, Shoot Riviera), 1992, Shinchosha, ISBN 9784106027284
- Mākusu no yama (マークスの山, Marks' Mountain), 1993, Hayakawa Shobõ, ISBN 9784152035530
- Redi joka (レディ・ジョーカー, Lady Joker), 1997, Mainichi Shimbun, ISBN 9784620105796
- Haruko jōka (晴子情歌, Haruko's Love Song), 2002, Shinchosha, ISBN 9784103784029
- Shin Ria-ō (新リア王, A New King Lear), 2005, Shinchosha, ISBN 9784103784043
- Taiyō o hiku uma (太陽を曳く馬, The Horse that Pulls the Sun), 2009, Shinchosha, ISBN 9784103784067
- Tsuchi no ki (土の記, Working the Earth), 2016, Shinchosha, ISBN 9784103784098
