= Sea Lord (novel) =

1989 novel by Bernard Cornwell

First edition

Sea Lord (a.k.a. Killer's Wake in the United States) is a 1989 thriller novel by the British author Bernard Cornwell, one of a series of sailing-based thrillers. It was published by Michael Joseph.

== Synopsis ==
John Rossendale is the current Earl of Stowey. After the death of Johnny's father (some time before the book begins), the family had to sell almost everything, to pay the death duties on the estate. Johnny's mother's only goal being to hold on to the family seat, at Stowey Manor.

Johnny having grown up with boats and not wanting to be involved in family affairs, left to sail the world with his best friend Charlie. Four years before our story begins, Johnny and Charlie, had got as far as Australia before bad news demanded their return to England. So after selling their boat they flew home. Johnny's elder brother, unable to cope with the stress from constantly fighting creditors in an attempt to hold on to the family home, had committed suicide. John had inherited the Earldom of Stowey, with all its troubles.

Johnny, the irresponsible younger brother, returned home only to fall right in the middle of the storm. His mother had decided the only option was to sell their last remaining significant asset, a painting of Sunflowers by Van Gogh. Only before the sale can be completed, the painting is stolen. Johnny, under the weight of circumstantial evidence, is assumed to be the thief, only the police decide they cannot prove it. Johnny decided to do what he does best and go back to sea, to run away from it all.

The story begins with Johnny, recalled to England again to attend his mother's deathbed.

The threads of the story twist between the flawed hero Johnny; his twin sister, who has never forgiven her brother for arriving ten minutes before her, and who wants nothing but to regain the respect and position due her family; Georgina, his youngest, intellectually disabled sister, whom he adores; Jennifer the gorgeous stepdaughter of a very rich art collector who will pay anything to get Van Gogh's Sunflowers on his wall (and doesn't care if the world believe it to be stolen) and Charlie, Johnny's oldest and dearest friend.

== Reception ==
Publishers Weekly said: "Occasionally tripped up by tangled nautical jargon, Cornwell ( Wildtrack ) nevertheless delivers a pretty fair yarn." Kirkus Reviews described the book as a "Competent but unexceptional sails-and-slaughter adventure."

== Publishing information ==
Published by Michael Joseph, 1998. ISBN 9780718131586.
