= Ramo Nakajima =

Japanese writer (1952–2004)

In 2003

Ramo Nakajima (中島らも, Nakajima Ramo; April 3, 1952 – July 26, 2004) was a Japanese cult novelist, essayist, and copywriter. He also appeared frequently on Japanese TV as an actor. He was born in Amagasaki City, Hyōgo Prefecture.

He received eighth place in his entrance exam to the prestigious Nada High School, and continued to the Osaka University of Arts, where he graduated from the school of broadcasting. He then worked for a publishing company for five years, where he became famous for his catchy advertisements and commercials. He was given his own advice column in Asahi Shimbun, called the "Lighthearted Worry Column", which highlighted his strange and unique sense of humor and made him a household name. He began to work as a freelance copywriter in 1987, and in his free time, wrote the novels that would give him his cult following in Japan, as well as a variety of rakugo, essays, scripts and short stories. His best-known works include the novels Tonight, from Every Bar in Town (13th Eiji Yoshikawa New Author Prize), The Pigs of Gadara (Mystery Writers of Japan Award), and The Night of Human Models (Naoki Prize).

After his success in novels, he then expanded into theater, producing Laugh-to-Death Lilliput Army, as well as creating his own rock band, PISS, of which he was the lead singer and guitar player. After the band dissolved, he then formed Ramo and the Mother's Boys, where he played rhythm guitar and sang.

Nakajima was known for his wild lifestyle and his constant use of drugs and alcohol. His appearances on television in the late 1990s and early 2000s were always an audience draw because of his slurred speech—probably from years of alcohol and drug abuse—and humorous personality. He was arrested and convicted of marijuana possession in 2003; he was sentenced to five years incarceration. He was put into a mental hospital for a brief period, and then served his 10-month sentence, with a suspended sentence of five years. He then released an essay about his trials in prison called "The Prison Diet".

After his release, he plunged back into alcoholism. On July 15, 2004, after drinking late at a bar, he fell down a staircase and suffered serious head injuries. He never recovered, dying on July 26, 2004.
