= Daniel Friedman (author) =

American author of mystery fiction

- Occupation: Author
- Writing career
- Notable awards: Macavity Award (2013)

Daniel Friedman is an American author.

== Works ==
Friedman is known for his first novel, Don't Ever Get Old (2013). The book was nominated for an Edgar Award for Best First Novel, the Anthony Award for Best First Novel, and won the Macavity Award for Best First Novel. A sequel, Don't Ever Look Back, was published in 2014.

== Books ==
=== Buck Schatz ===
1. Don't Ever Get Old, St. Martin's Press, 2012
2. Don't Ever Look Back, St. Martin's Press, 2014
3. Running Out of Road, MacMillan/St. Martin's Press/Minotaur 03/24/2020. ISBN 9781466862715

=== Other books ===
- Riot Most Uncouth: A Lord Byron Mystery, Minotaur Books, 2015
