= You Sano =

Ichiro Maruyama (22 May 1928 – 27 April 2013), who wrote under the pen name You Sano, was a Japanese mystery writer and critic.

== Early life ==
Maruyama was born in Omori, Tokyo City (now Tokyo, Ota-ku, Omori). In 1953, he graduated from the University of Tokyo Department of Psychology and began work as a part-time writer in Hokkaido for Yomiuri Shimbun.

== Writing career ==
In 1958, Maruyama submitted essays to a weekly essay contest co-sponsored by Asahi Shimbun, for which he won third and second prizes. The following year, he published a novel titled A Lead, his official debut in the detective genre. In 1959, he left the newspaper. He produced over a thousand short stories, many of which were made into bunko, but the introduction of a consumption tax led to price revisions, and many publishers stopped printing them.

Jugo Kuroiwa criticized his writing and described it as "novels that do not shed blood and sweat", that go through mystery as an intellectual game but in which, on the other hand, the patterns of work repeatedly become mannered, eliminating eccentric and large-scale crimes, creating realism and a characteristic moderation.

Maruyama named Paul Winterton his favorite writer. He befriended other writers and maintained those friendships. Aside from close friend Jugo Kuroiwa, his other friends included Kyo Takigawa, Tensei Kono, Shinichi Hoshi, Tsutomu Mizukami and Shoji Yuki, young artists who formed a friendship ring they called a "murder club." The group later included Saho Sasazawa, Haruhiko Oyabu, Michio Tsuzuki, Jiro Ikushima, and Masako Togawa.

He won the Japan Mystery Literature Award in 1997 and the Kikuchi Kan Prize in 2009.

On April 27, 2013, he died of pneumonia in hospital at Kawasaki City. He was 84 years old.

== Works (approximate translations) ==
=== Short Works Compilations ===
- Copper Wedding (1959)
- Transparent Assassination (1960)
- Metal Sound Disease Incident (April 1961)
- Murder Letter Collection (1962)
- Important Parties (1962)
- Secret Inn Series
  - Secret Inn (1964)
  - Masked Guest (October 1987)
  - Similar Beard (October 1988)
  - Surrounding People (October 1991)
  - After the Turbulence - Best Selection of Secret Inn (November 2000)
- Gynecologist (1966)
- A Whore Prostitute (1968)
- Momentary Murderous Intent (1969)
- It Opens the Darkness (1970)
- A Living Woman (1970)
- Barking Flame (1970)
- Replaced Blood (1970)
- Accusation of Darkness (1971)
- Large Chamber (1971)
- You Sano Mystery Masterpiece collection
  - Right Outside the Storm (1971)
  - It Jumped, It Fell (January 2000)
- Mystery Evades (1972)
- Hidden Fangs (1972)
- Haunted House (1972)
- Great Glide (1976)
- Odorous Skin (August 1977)
- Divorce Notice (1978)
- Jisen Short Series
  - A Sunny Murder (December 1981)
  - Foolish Crime of a Wise Person (1979)
  - A Trivial Crime of Ordinary People (1979)
  - Canned Murder (October 1983)
  - Murders of Friends (March 1982)
  - Well, Now... (February 1987)
  - Homicide Rank (July 1984)
  - They Are Reliable (September 1991)
- Complete Crime Study (1978)
- A Testimony of a Handbag (1979)
- Mystery Training Novel (April 1979)
- Unfamiliar Skin (June 1979)
- Crime General University (January 1980)
- A Woman as an Award (April 1980)
- Two Corpses (January 1981)
- Perfume and Gloves (May 1981)
- Red Milk (October 1981)
- Collapsed (August 1982)
- Dogs and Murders and Dogs Mystery Masterpiece Collection (June 1984)
- Willingness to Appear (July 1984)
- Phone of the Dead (January 1985)
- Mahjong Case Files (July 1985)
- Blood Betrayal (July 1985)
- One Short Per Year × 25
  - [Top] Miscarriage (August 1985)
  - [Middle] Stolen Car (October 1985)
  - [Bottom] Last Night (December 1985)
- Various Eyes (January 1986)
- Emergency Board Meeting (January 1986)
- My Version · Criminal White Paper (January 1986)
- Old Wound (January 1986)
- Police Disappearance (February 1986)
- Catastrophe of a Dream (May 1986)
- Occasional Series
  - Occasional Murder (August 1986)
  - Occasional Crime (November 1989)
  - Occasional Incident (April 1993)
  - Occasional Hatred (June 1995)
- Woman Next Door (January 1987)
- The Same Women (April 1987)
- The Lost Month (May 1987)
- Voice in the City Series
  - A Woman Headed to Bury (August 1987)
  - A Woman Who Burst Into Tears (September 1989)
- Oddly on the Same Day... (August 1987)
- Series of Dolls That Began to Walk "Articles in Red Frames" (May 1988)
  - [Renamed] Puppet Walked Out (November 1990)
- I Hesitate at Midnight (July 1988)
- Dry Skin (September 1988)
- The End Result as Desired (April 1989) - short work collection
- Blue Memory (December 1989)
- Fun Crime (July 1990)
- Missing People (August 1990)
- Phantom Murder (September 1990)
- Nine Divorces (December 1990)
- Invitation of Skin (September 1991)
- Scary Message (January 1992)
- Forever Yesterday (January 1992)
- Katsu! 42 years old (December 1992)
- Unrelated Relationship (June 1993)
- Various Parting (September 1993)
- Mr. F's Clock (July 1994)
- Discussion of Verbs (December 1994)
- Sumo Fondling Woman - White Detective (March 1995)
  - [Renamed] White Detective (September 2007)
- Passing (April 1995)
- The Role of the Lips (September 1995)
- Northeast Southwest Detective House
  - Northeast Southwest (NEWS) Detective House (January 1996)
  - [Renamed] Coincidental Witnesses - Northeast Southwest Detective House (June 2000)
  - Shy Discoverer - Northeast Southwest Detective House 2 (December 1998)
- Ten-Year Story (June 1997)
- Chest Play - New and Human Body Story (May 1998)
- Four Thousand Characters Golf Club (June 1998) - Golf novel collection
- Gleaming Sand (July 1998)
- You Sano Short Detective House paperback original latest 14 installment (December 1998)
- Inexplicable Messenger (August 1999)
- The Rabbit's Secret of a Long-Ago Mystery (May 2001)
- Misconception of the Cicada Insectarium Mystery (January 2003)
- Irregular Weapon Contemporary Replacement (November 2003)
- The Incident of the Tree Ring (November 2004)
- Funeral Song (August 2005)
- Unsteady Retirees (October 2005)
- Walk, Walk (January 2007)
- Culture of an Election (December 2007)
- Seven-Colored Closed Room (July 2008)
- A Burned Finger Near the Old Mystery (July 2008)
- Sparrow Feast (February 2009)
- The Best of the Best from the Mystery of the Thousand (March 2010)
- The Final Rarity (October 2010)

=== Novels ===
- One Lead (1959)
- Fourth Relationship (1959)
- Exorbitant Compensation (1959)
- Season of Betting (1960)
- Invitation of Brain Waves (1960)
- Murder by Two People (1960)
- Incomplete Will (1960)
- Chastity Examination (1960)
- Monologue (1960)
- Secret Party (1961)
- The 112 Plan (1961)
  - [Renamed] Plan No. 112 (October 1981)
- Perfect Game (1961)
- Missing Article Newspaper Murder Case (1961)
  - [Renamed] An Unknown Article (May 1990)
- Professional Baseball Series
  - Batter No. 10 (1962)
  - Underground Stadium (1963)
- Unfortunate Weekend (1962)
- Distant Voice (1962)
- Invalid Match (1962)
- Heavy Wad of Cash (1962)
- Remarriage Trip (1963)
- INS Detective Office (1963)
- Apprentice Angel (1963)
- Honey Nest (1963)
- A Golden Mourning (1964)
- Skin of Light (1964)
- Brilliant Scandal (1964) -

.

- Stolen Shadow (1964)
- Transparent Conception (1965)
- Dead Time (1965)
- The Walls Whisper (1966)
- Crazy Signal (1966)
- You Sano Series 1-6 Kodansha, 1966-1967
- Red Hot Sea (1967)
- Shadow to Travel (1968)
- Panting Pantyhose (1969)
  - [Renamed] Jewelry and Their Murderous Intent (December 1984)
- Infrared Music (1970) - Dramatized in NHK 'Shonen Drama Series' in 1975.
- Runaway (January 1970)
- 300 Million Yen Case (1970)
- Experimental Education (1971)
- The 6th Laboratory (1971)
  - [Republished] The 6th Laboratory (April 1983)
- Sand Stairs (1971)
- Murderous Intent of the Hoof (1972)
- Baseball That Killed (1972)
- Four People of the Same Name Are Dead (1973)
- Cute Eyewitnesses (1973)
- White Heavy Blood (1973)
- One-wing Flight (1974)
- Human Monkey (1975)
- Killing of Orizuru (1975)
- You Sano Murder Race Bestsellers 1975
- It Disappears to the Pasture (August 1975)
- Forbidden Reins (1976)
- Elegant Wrongdoing (1976)
- Seven-Colored Closed Room (1977)
- Beautiful Death Penalty (1978)
- Fang Crossing the Sea (October 1978) - edited serial shorts
- But the Murder Is... (1979)
- The Day the Sky Shakes (September 1979)
- Stolen Lie (February 1980)
- Night and Day (September 1980)
- Silvery Claw (January 1982)
- Late Night Neighborhood Series
  - Walking Bank Notes (September 1982)
  - Loathed Name (November 1982)
- Victim in Cage (May 1982)
- Mirror's Words (1983)
- Sudden Margin (July 1983)
- Northern Case Book (February 1983)
- Adult Smell (January 1984)
- D Bureau Chief of Case Files "Just a Single Man" (May 1984) - edited serial shorts
  - [Renamed] D Bureau Chief of Case Files (July 1987)
- A Buried Letter (September 1984)
- Defendant Who Is Too Quiet (November 1985)
- One and Only That (April 1986)
- The Last Voice (September 1986)
- SN9 Flight from Haneda (March 1988) - edited serial shorts
- Former Tribunal Judgment (April 1989)
- Private Detective (October 1989)
- Living Ash (July 1990)
- A False Skin (May 1991)
- Sneaky Ears (June 1991)
- 2 (S + T) Story (January 1994)
- Private Vacationer Leaves White Paper (February 1994) - edited serial shorts
- Flying Detective Crow's Cork Big Success (June 1994) - Juvenile fiction
- Afternoon of the Prosecution Board (May 1995) - edited serial shorts. Dramatized as "Incident / Citizen's Ruling" by TV Tokyo.
- Dangers Carried (May 1995)
- Circumstances of An Affair (December 1995)
- Justice Alliance (December 1996) - edited serial shorts
- Infectious Love Affair (April 1997)
- Professor Furuzu Series - edited serial shorts
  - Elegant Inference by Professor Furuzu (July 1999)
  - Reverse Relations of Professor Furuzu's Gender Sociology (September 2001)
- Chain of Bother (October) - edited serial shorts
- Dual Role Era (May 2000) - edited serial shorts
- Age of Fingers (May 2000)
- Paper Crane of Mourning (November 2001)
- Cemetery Garden and Nobel Prize Life Record of Ms. Iwakuni (September 2011) - edited serial shorts

=== Reviews and Other Works ===
- Reasoning Journal
  - Reasoning Journal You Sano Mystery (1976)
  - New Reasoning Journal Review (September 1980)
    - [Renamed] Reasoning Journal Part 2 (September 1986)
  - Reasoning Journal Part 3 (January 1984)
  - Reasoning Journal Part 4 (July 1986)
  - Reasoning Journal Part 5 (December 1988)
  - Reasoning Journal Part 6 (April 1992)
  - Reasoning Journal Part 7 (January 1995)
  - Reasoning Journal Part 8 (November 1997)
  - Reasoning Journal Part 9 (January 2001)
  - Reasoning Journal Part 10 (September 2005)
  - Reasoning Journal Part 11 (September 2008)
  - Reasoning Journal FINAL (December 2012)
- "Thoughts On Capital Punishment or Innocence or Penalty" (May 1984) - Co-written with Katsuhiko Nishijima
- Lipstick and Crime (November 1985) - Essay Collection
- Mystery Three-Sided Mirror (November 1986)
- Poetry In a Cage (song) Nonfiction / Futawa Ri Incident (November 1993)
- Anger of the 'Small Insects' (November 1993)
- Destroy and View (June 1994) - Essay Collection
- Golf Narrow Road to the Deep North (July 2003) - Essay
- Half a Century with Mystery (February 2009)

== TV ==
- I name detective (1977, TV Asahi ) - Regular solver
