= Kawataro Nakajima =

Japanese writer

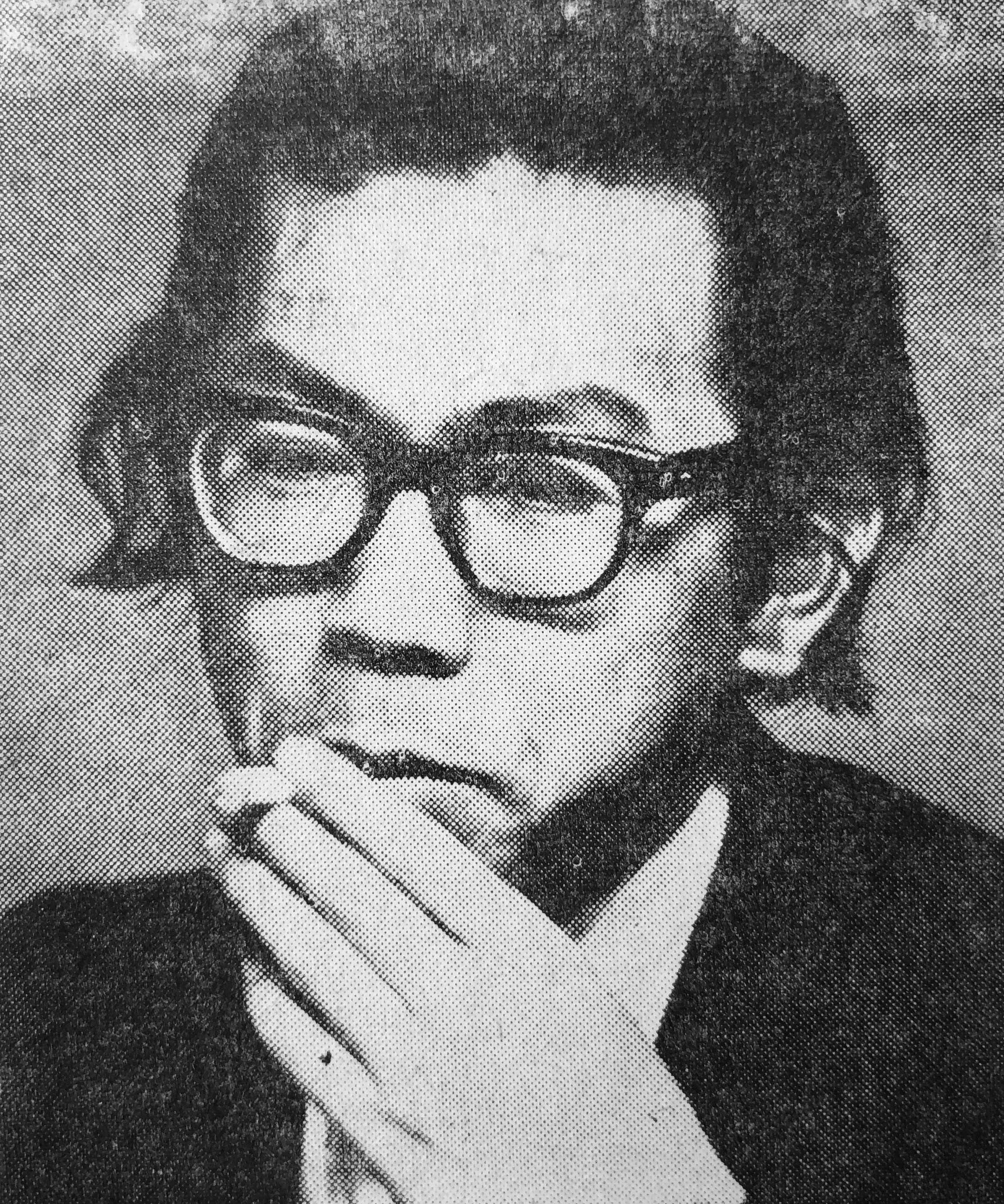
Kawataro Nakajima

Kawatarō Nakajima (中島 河太郎, Nakajima Kawatarō; June 5, 1917 – May 5, 1999) was a Japanese researcher of Japanese popular culture.

== See also ==
- Shunro Oshikawa
