= Ei Ogawa =

Ei Ogawa (Japanese: 小川英, Ogawa Ei, March 10, 1930; Osaka – April 27, 1994; Tokyo), also credited as Hide Ogawa (江里 明, Ogawa Hide) was a Japanese screenwriter. He worked on many projects for Toho and Nikkatsu.

== Career ==
His real name was Eiji Ogawa. He graduated from the Faculty of Law at Chuo University. Ogawa studied under the screenwriter and author Keiichiro Ryu. He wrote many Nikkatsu action films's screenplays. Ogawa was a prominent exponent of the Golden Age of Nikkatsu action movies during the 1960s.

Starting in around 1970, he shifted his main activity to TV dramas. He worked on the prime-time television detective series Taiyō ni Hoero!, of which he was the main writer. In 1978, he contributed with his writing to the likewise detective series Tokyo Megure Keishi, starring Kinya Aikawa and Tomomi Sato. Ogawa has also written numerous drama scripts for different genres, such as action, suspense, and historical drama.

At the end of the 1960s, he joined the video production group Jack Production (ジャック・プロダクション, Jakku purodakushon) with, among others, Takashi Tsuboshima, Yasuo Tanami, Katsuki Iwauchi. Among other things, he and Tsuboshima co-wrote the screenplay of Tazutazushi.

In addition, Ogawa presided over the private school Eijuku for training young screenwriters.

He died of respiratory failure on April 27, 1994.
