= Saho Sasazawa =

Japanese writer (1930–2002)

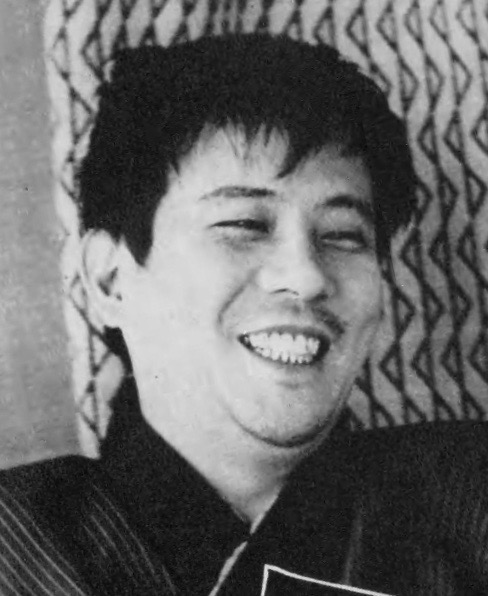
- Born: Masaru Sasazawa; November 15, 1930; Tokyo Prefecture
- Died: October 21, 2002 (aged 71); Komae, Tokyo
- Occupation: Novelist
- Writing career
- Pen name: Saho Sasazawa
- Genres: Period novel, mystery, Suspense
- Notable work: Kogarashi Monjirō

Sasazawa Saho (笹沢左保; November 15, 1930 – October 21, 2002) was a Japanese author, known as the creator of the Kogarashi Monjirō novels, which became a hit televised drama series.

He was a self-declared member of the shinhonkaku-ha or "new orthodox" school of detective fiction writing. Aside from mysteries, he also wrote thrillers, essays and history books, with some 380 books to his credit.

== Life and works ==
Saho Sasazwa was born Masaru Sasazawa (笹沢勝), the third son of poet Yoshiaki Sasazawa. Born in Yokohama according to many sources, but it has also been said he was actually born in Yodobashi, Tokyo and later moved to Yokohama. There he attended what is now Kanto Gakuin University's high school division, but failed to graduate, frequently running away from home during this period.

By 1952 he was in Tokyo, working at the Postal Insurance Bureau run by the Postal Ministry. Around this time he dabbled in writing plays.

In 1958, he was struck by a DUI car, suffering injuries expecting to take 8 months to fully heal. But his short stories Yami no naka no dengon (闇の中の伝言; "The message in the dark") and Kunin me no giseisha (九人目の犠牲者; "The ninth victim"), which he had submitted to prize contest before the accident both qualified and were printed in the December 1958 special issue of the Hoseki magazine.

In 1960, (Note: In 1960, after his work Kunshō ("Medal") was also selected among notables in the short fiction contest co-run by Shukan Asahi and Hoseki.) his Manekarezaru kyaku (招かれざる客; "The uninvited guest") became a runner-up for the 5th Edogawa Rampo Prize, and the release of this in book format marked his debut as novelist.

He adopted the pen name Saho, which was taken from his wife's name Sahoko (佐保子). (Note: His name was originally styled Saho (佐保) but was changed to Saho (左保) using a different character, in 1961.)

His Hitokui (人喰い; "Man-eater", 1961) was awarded the 14th Mystery Writers of Japan Award, after which he resigned from the Postal Ministry and became a full-time professional writer.

With his Roppongi shinjū (六本木心中; "Roppongi double-suicide") (1962) he received his third nomination for the prestigious semi-annual Naoki Prize for popular fiction. He had been twice nominated for the prize before, for Hitokui and Kūhaku no kiten (空白の起点; "Starting point of blankness"), and although he was short-listed to win this time, (Note: An "editor from the publisher sponsoring the [prize, i.e. Bungeishunju-sha] flatly declared [Sasazawa] is unmistakably going to win", according to Akira Miki, a former editor for Kodansha.) he was disappointed once again. (Note: Seichō Matsumoto and Keita Genji pushed for Sasazawa's Roppongi shinjū but other panelists disagreed, and the award was shared by two other authors, Hitomi Yamaguchi for Eburi man shi no yūga na seikatsu and Sonoko Sugimoto for Koshū no kishi.) Around this time, while declaring himself to be one of the practitioners of honkaku-ha (本格派) or "orthodox school" of mystery fiction-writing, (Note: Kenkyusha's Shin wa-ei chū-jiten dictionary (4th ed., 1995) has a subentry on honkaku-ha and gives the translation "orthodox school". On honkaku-teki it gives three senses: "genuine, real", "orthodox", or "standard". Amanda C. Seaman says: "..what Japanese critics call honkaku-ha, or standard, detective fiction.) he wrote a trilogy on double-suicide without homicide; of these, the Naoki Prize-nominated Roppongi Double-Suicide was appraised as a piece "depicting empty love between a young man and a girl", which entwined "the drama of loss of faith in humanity" into the mystery novel.

In 1970, he ventured into writing period novels (in particular matatabi fiction about traveling gamblers) with Mikaeri tōge no rakujitsu (見返り峠の落日; "Sunset at Look-back Pass"). Sasazawa's style of this gambler fiction has been characterized as "casting a nihilistic shadow, adding an aura of Cowboy Westerns". The samurai period gambler piece that brought Sasazawa lasting fame was his Kogarashi Monjirō series, begun with the episode entitled Shamen bana wa chitta (赦免花は散った; "The Clemency Flower has Scattered", 1970). The book was TV-dramatized with Atsuo Nakamura playing the leading role of the gambler Monjirō, and the program achieved immense popularity.

He continued to write fiction in both contemporary and period settings.

Some of his outputs in modern settings from the subsequent period include the child-kidnapping novel Mayonaka no shijin (真夜中の詩人; "Midnight poet", 1972), called a masterpiece on par with his earlier great works; Haruka nari waga ai o (遥かなりわが愛を; "My love so far", 1976) which launched the Detective Isenami series;Tasatsu misaki (他殺岬; "Cape homicide", 1977) was a time-limit kidnapping story with a twist, the scandal-monger must devise a ransom for the perpetrator who only wants vengeance; Kyūkon no misshitsu (求婚の密室; "The marriage-proposing locked room", 1978) features a well-crafted locked room gimmickry.

He also became well known at one time for Akuma no heya ("Devil's room", 1981) and its sequels in his Akuma ("Devil") series of erotic suspense-thriller novels (kannō sasupensu (官能サスペンス)), this being a hybrid genre between the erotic novel and suspense-thriller.

His Aribai no uta (アリバイの唄; "Alibi song", 1990) started the Hideo Yoake casefile series of novels, dramatized on TV as the Taxi Driver's Mystery Diary starring Tsunehiko Watase; The TV series Torishirabe shitsu "Interrogation room" ran its first episode in 1994 based on the novel of the same title published 1993.

Period pieces other than Monjirō include Sasurai kaidō (さすらい街道; "Wandering highway", 1972) which employs mystery novel techniques in historical settings, the Jigoku no Tatsu crime-solving novels (1972–), televised as Jigoku no Tatsu torimono hikae (地獄の辰捕物控) "Tatsu from hell's Casebook"; another TV-dramtized series on Hanmi no Okon (1974–), whose title character Okon bears a tattoo which forms a complete dragon when combined with her lover's.

During his lifetime he published some 377 books.

With declining health in 1987, he recuperated at a hospital in the town of Mikatsuki, Saga which bore a name similar to Mikazuki-mura (Mikazuki Village), the fictitious birthplace of Monjirō. After being discharged, he made the adjacent town of Fujichō his home, and although he had to relocate in 1995 to Hyogomachi in Saga city for hospital access, the Fujichō residence later became the Sasazawa Saho Memorial Museum.

He established the Kyushu Saga Taishūbungaku Prize for literature by new authors in 1993, with the final 24th prize awarded in 2017.

In 2001 he returned to Kodaira, Tokyo, and succumbed to liver cancer (HCC) on 21 October 2002 at a hospital in Komae, Tokyo.

=== Legacy and influence ===
He was a prolific writer, who at his height wrote 1,000 or even 1,500 pages of manuscript per month, and has been called a "constant innovator" or experimenter. Sasazawa is known for applying the mystery novel techniques of "surprise-twist endings (donden-gaeshi)" and climatic endings in writing matatabi fiction, thus introducing a new element to fiction about wandering rogue swordsman-gamblers.

He wrote a study in sensual-erotic suspense with the novel Akuma no heya (悪魔の部屋; "Demon's Room") which was adapted into film, and crime novels consisting entirely of conversation, such as Donden gaeshi (どんでん返し; "the flip-reversal"), and Dōgyōsha (同行者; "fellow believer of the path"), (Note: Originally tilted Akuma no michizure. The although the title can be read dōkōsha, the dōgyōsha reading is confirmed, as well as its meaning.) and Ushiro sugata no seizō (後ろ姿の聖像; "rear-view icon") where the alibi trick undergoes a complete 180-degrees plot-twist. (Note: Later retitled Moshimo omae ga furimuita nara ("If Ever You Look Behind You"))

He held a staunch purist stance about detective fiction writing. Sasazawa identified himself as a proponent of the Shin-honkaku-ha (新本格派) "New Orthodox School" or "New Authentic School". Such a writer, he explained, was not only required to be "orthodox" (or "authentic") and devise a clever trick used in the crime, but in addition, needed to maintain realisticness in the human characters employed. When he sat on the selection panel for the Edogawa Rampo Prize, he repeatedly bewailed the laxening of the definition of what could be considered "detective fiction". In 1977, he wrote an essay that polemicized against the novel of manners contaminating the mystery fiction genre.

== Selected works ==
=== Modern mysteries ===
==== The Misaki ("Cape") series ====
- Tasatsu misaki (他殺岬; "Cape Homicide"), 1976
- Furin misaki (不倫岬; "Cape Adultery"), 1978
- Mujō misaki (無情岬; "Cape Merciless"), 1979
- Tōbō misaki (逃亡岬; "Cape Escape"), 1981
- Aijin misaki (愛人岬; "Cape Lover"), 1981
- Akuma misaki (悪魔岬; "Cape Devil"), 1985
- Zanshō misaki (残照岬; "Cape Afterglow"), 1987

==== The Akuma ("Devil") series ====
- Akuma no heya (悪魔の部屋; "The Devil's Chamber"), 1981
- Akuma no kohan (悪魔の湖畔; "The Devil's Lakeside"), 1981
- Akuma no kankei (悪魔の関係; "The Devil's Relationship"), 1982
- Akuma no hitojichi (悪魔の人質; "The Devil's Hostage"), 1982
- Akuma no chinmoku (悪魔の沈黙; "The Devil's Silence"), 1983
- Akuma no yūwaku (悪魔の誘惑; "The Devil's Enticement"), 1983
- Akuma no shokei (悪魔の処刑; "The Devil's Execution"), 1994

==== The Yōbi ("Days of the Week") series ====
- Onna wa getsuyōbi ni naku (女は月曜日に泣く; "The Woman Weeps on Monday")
- Nichiyōbi ni wa korosanai (日曜日には殺さない; "No Kills on Sunday")
- Ososugita ame no kayōbi (遅すぎた雨の火曜日; "The Belated Rain of Tuesday")
- Yami wa suiyōbi ni otozureru (闇は水曜日に訪れる; "Darkness Visits on Wednesday")
- Saraba dōbi no kitakaze (さらば土曜日の北風; "Goodbye North-Wind of Saturday")
- Akujo mokuyōbi ni shisu (悪女木曜日に死す; "Evil Woman dies on Thursday")

==== The Hideo Yoake taxi-driver series ====
- Oikoshi kinshi: Doraibā tantei Yoake Hideo no jikenbo (追越禁止—ドライバー探偵夜明日出夫の事件簿; "No Passing: Casebook of Driver Detective Hideo Yoake"), Kodansha Novels, 1991
- Ippōtsūko: Doraibā tantei Yoake Hideo no jikenbo (一方通行—ドライバー探偵夜明日出夫の事件簿; "One Way Street"), 1992
- Hirusagari: Yoake Hideo no jikenbo (昼下がり—夜明日出夫の事件簿; "Past Noon"), 1994
- Yoake: Yoake Hideo no jikenbo (夜明け—夜明日出夫の事件簿; "Dawn"), Nichibun Bunko, 1998
- Yūgure: Yoake Hideo no jikenbo (夕暮れ—夜明日出夫の事件簿; "Evening"), 1999
- Aribai no uta: Yoake Hideo no jikenbo (アリバイの唄—夜明日出夫の事件簿; "Alibi Song:"9), 199
- Seizon suru yūrei: Yoake Hideo no suiri nisshi (生存する幽霊—タクシードライバーの推理日誌; "The Living Ghost: a Taxi-Driver's Deduction Journal"), Tokuma Bunko, 2000

==== Misc. ====
- Manekarezaru kyaku (招かれざる客; "The Uninvited Guest"), 1960
- Kiri ni tokeru (霧に溶ける; "Melting in the Fog"), 1960
- Kekkon te nanisa (結婚って何さ; "What is Marriage Anyway"), 1960
- Hitokui (人喰い; "Maneater"), 1960
- Kūhaku no kiten (空白の起点; "Starting-point of Blankness"), former title Koshū no kiten (孤愁の起点; "Starting-point of Lonely Woe"), 1961
- Awa no onna (泡の女; "Woman of Froth"), 1961
- Mahiru ni wakareru no wa iya (真昼に別れるのはいや; "Don't want to Break up at Midday"), 1961
- Kurai keisha (暗い傾斜; "Dark Slope", 1962)
- Totsuzen no ashita (突然の明日; "Sudden Tomrrow"), 1963
- Yureru shikai (揺れる視界; "Shaking Filed of Vision"), 1963
- Mayonaka no shijin (真夜中の詩人; "Midnight Poet"), 1972
- Sannin no tōjōjinbutsu (三人の登場人物; "Three Personae Dramatis"), 1975
- Harukanari waga ai o (遥かなりわが愛を; "My Love so far"), 1976
- Harukanari waga sakebi (遥かなりわが叫び; "My Distant Scream"), 1977
- Honoo no kyozō (炎の虚像; "Virtual Flame Image"), 1977
- Ijōsha (異常者; "Abnormal Individual"), 1978
- Umi no banshō (海の晩鐘; "Vesper at Sea"), 1979
- Kyūkon no misshitsu (求婚の密室; "The Marriage-Proposing Locked Room"), 1978
- Chika suimyaku (地下水脈; "Underground Water-veins"), 1979
- Sebun satsujinjiken (セブン殺人事件; "The Seven Murder Case", an anthology of shorts), 1980
- Dondengaeshi (どんでん返し; "Flip-reversal", anthology), 1981
- Kamen no gekkō (仮面の月光; "Masquerade Moonlight"), 1982
- Mashō no gekkō (魔性の月光; "Enchanting Moonlight"), 1983
- Ushiro sugata no seizō (後ろ姿の聖像; "Rear-view Icon"), 1981
- Furimuke ba kiri (ふり向けば霧; "Turn back and it's Fog"), 1987
- Kiri no bansan (霧の晩餐; "Dinner in the Fog"), 1989
- Torishirabashitsu shizuka naru shitō (取調室 静かなる死闘; "Interrogation Room: the Silent Death-Struggle"), 1993

=== Period novels ===
- Mikaeri tōge no rakujitsu (見かえり峠の落日; "Sunset at Look-back Pass"), Kodansha, 1970

==== Kogarashi Monjiro series ====
- Shamenbana wa chitta (赦免花は散った; "The Clemency Flower has Scattered"), Kodansha, 1971
- Nyoninkō no yami wo saku (女人講の闇を裂く; "Ripping the Women's Group's Darkness"), 1971
- Rokujizō no kage wo kiru (六地蔵の影を斬る; "Slicing the Six Jizo's Shadows"), 1972
- Akatsuki no oiwake ni tatsu (暁の追分に立つ; "Standing at the Fork in the Road at Dawn"), 1972
- Yonakiishi wa kiri ni nureta (夜泣き石は霧に濡れた; "The Night-wailing stone Dampened in the Fog"), 1972
- Onnen-zaka wo hotaru ga koeta (怨念坂を螢が越えた; "Fireflies over Grudge Hill"), 1973
- Fue ga nagareta Karisaka tōge (笛が流れた雁坂峠; "Flute sounded on Karisaka Pass"), 1973
- Kirisame ni nido naita (霧雨に二度哭いた; "Cried twice in the Misty Rain"), 1976
- Inochi wa ichido suteru mono (命は一度捨てるもの; "Life is for throwing away once"), 1976
- Sanzu no kawa wa hitori de watare (三途の川は独りで渡れ; "Cross the Sanzu River Alone"), 1977
- Nido to ogamenu mikazuki (二度と拝めぬ三日月; "A Crescent Moon You Will Never Again Behold"), 1977
- Ōshuji nanoka no shissō (奥州路・七日の疾走; "Path to Ōshu, a Seven-day Speed-Race"), 1978
- Shin Kogarashi Monjirō: Matte chitta tōgebana (新・木枯し紋次郎 舞って散った峠花; "New Kogarashi Monjiro: the Mountain-Pass Flower that Danced and Scattered"), 1988

==== Return of Kogarashi Monjiro series ====
- Kaette kita Kogarashi Monjirō (帰って来た木枯し紋次郎; "The Return of Kogarashi Monjiro"), Shinchosha, 1996
- Onajiku hitogoroshi (同じく人殺し; "Likewise a Killer"), 1996
- Kadowakashi (かどわかし; "Abduction"), 1997
- Saraba temari-uta (さらば手鞠唄; "Farewell Ball-bouncing-song"), 1998
- Akujo wo kiru toki (悪女を斬るとき; "When Sword-slaying an Evil Woman"), 1999
- Saig no tōge-goe (最後の峠越え; "The Final Surmounting of the Mountain-pass"), 1999

==== Downfall: Rise and Fall of the Tokugawa Cabinet ====
1. Kan'ei no ishin tachi (寛永の遺臣たち; "Old Vassals of the Kan'ei Period") Shodensha, 1993-12
2. Tairō Sakai Tadakiyo to Hotta Masatoshi no tatakai (大老・酒井忠清と堀田正俊の闘い; "Fight between the Tairōs Sakai Tadakiyo" and Hotta Masatoshi), 1994-09
3. Yanagisawa Yoshiyasu to Arai Hakuseki no tairitsu (柳沢吉保と新井白石の対立; "Opposition between Yanagisawa Yoshiyasu and Arai Hakuseki"), 1995-04
4. Yoshimune dokusai (吉宗独裁; "Yoshimune's Dictatorship"), 1996-03
5. Kaishin-ha Tanuma Okitsugu no shinbō (改新派・田沼意次の深謀; "Reformer Tanuma Okitsugu's Profound Schemes"), 1996-12
6. Kurofune to saigo no kenryokusha tachi (黒船と最後の権力者たち; "The Black Ships and the Last Power-wielders"), 1997-09
- Shodensha Bunko format
1. Jōkan: Yabō no geba shōgun (上巻 野望の下馬将軍; "Volume One: The Ambitious Geba Shogun"), 2002-01
2. Chūkan: Shōgun Yoshimune no Inbō (中巻 将軍吉宗の陰謀; "Volume Two: Shogun Yoshimune's Conspiracy"), 2002–03
3. Gekan: Kurofune jōran (下巻 黒船擾乱; "Volume Three: The Black Ship Pandemonium"), 2002–05

==== Miyamoto Musashi series ====
1. Musashi yaburetari (武蔵敗れたり; "Musashi, You Are Defeated"), Bungeishunjū, 1990-01
2. Ware jashin ariki (われ邪心ありき; "I Harbor Nefarious Thoughts"), 1990-02
3. Omei harasu ni oyobazu (汚名晴らすに及ばず; "No Need to Clear My Name"), 1990-03
4. Waga ikō tattobu beshi (わが威光尊ぶべし; "Venerate thee My Splendour"), 1990-08
5. Ware shisuru nari (われ死するなり; "I shall Die"), 1991-02
6. En tachigatashi (縁断ちがたし; "The Bond is Difficult to Sever"), 1991-08
7. Gishin osoruru beshi (疑心恐るべし; "Suspicious-mindedness is to be Feared"), 1992-03
8. Ware ni hyōhō nomi (われに兵法のみ; "I have Strategy Alone"), 1992-08
9. Nyonin wasuremaji (女人忘れまじ; "Women-folk, Never Forget"), 1993-05
10. Shin nasu beshi (信為すべし; "Do the Faithful Deed"), 1994-02
11. Waga kokoro yasukarazu (わが心安からず; "My Heart Unsettled"), 1994-07
12. Sesshō ni sōi nashi (殺生に相違なし; "A Kill, Nothing Less"), 1995-02
13. Tada hitori ayume (ただ独り歩め; "Walk on, All Alone"), 1995-07
14. Onore mo teki mo naku (おのれも敵もなく; "One's Own Enemy Being Nobody"), 1995-12
15. Hhyōhō wa fumetsu nari (兵法は不滅なり; "Strategy Never Dies"), 1996-06
- Bunshun Bunko format
1. Ten no maki (天の巻; "Book of Heaven"), Bunshun Bunko, 1996-10
2. Chi no Maki (地の巻; "Book of Earth"), 1996-10
3. Sui no maki (水の巻; "Book of Water"), 1996-11
4. Ka no maki (火の巻; "Book of Fire"), 1996-11
5. Fū no maki (風の巻; "Book of Wind"), 1996-12
6. Kū no maki (空の巻; "Book of Air"), 1996-12
7. Rei no maki (霊の巻; "Book of Spirit"), 1997-01
8. Gen no maki (玄の巻; "Book of Estoterics"), 1997-01

==== Sanada Ten Braves series ====
1. Ten no maki (天の巻), Tōen Shobō, 1980-09
2. Chi no maki (地の巻), 1980-11
3. Fū no maki (風の巻), 1981-05
- Kobunsha Bunko format
1. Sanada Jūyūshi kan no 1~5 (真田十勇士 巻の1～5; ""5), Kobunsha Bunko, 1989-01~0
- Futaba Bunko format
1. 1 Sarutobi Sasuke shokoku manyū (真田十勇士 巻の1 猿飛佐助諸国漫遊; "1 Sarutobi Sasuke Travels the Provinces"), Futaba Bunko, 1997-02
2. 2 Ōabare Miyoshi Seikai Nyūdō (真田十勇士 巻の2 大暴れ三好清海入道; "2 Miyoshi Seikai the Tonsured on a Great Rampage"), 1997-03
3. 3 Saizō Miyamoto Musashi wo yaburu (真田十勇士 巻の3 才蔵宮本武蔵を破る; "Saizo Defeats Miyamoto Musashi"), 1997-04
4. 4 Sanada Yukimura Osaka-jō nyujō (真田十勇士 巻の4 真田幸村大坂城入城; "4 Sanada Yukimura Enters Osaka Castle"), 1997-05
5. 5 Senjō ni chitta yūshi tachi (真田十勇士 巻の5 戦場に散った勇士たち; "5 The Braves Fall on the Battlefield"), 1997-05

==== Yakubyōgami Casebook ====
Yakubyōgami Donta's caebook. (Note: A Yakubyōgami is literally the "epidemic deity", but colloquially designates a person reputed to be a bringer of misfortune.)

- Yakubyōgami Donta (疫病神呑太; "Donta the Yakubyōgami"), Tokuma Shoten, 1991-10
  - Tokuma Bunko format
1. Yakubyōgami torimonochō (疫病神捕物帳; "The Yakubyōgami Casebook"), 1997-02
2. Futtekita akanbō (降って来た赤ン坊 疫病神捕物帳; "The Infant Fallen out of the Sky"), 1998-07

==== Yume to shōchi de ====
Or, "Full knowing it's a Dream" series

- (jō) Nezumi Kozō to rekishijō no otokotachi ibun (夢と承知で 上 鼠小僧と歴史上の男たち異聞; "Untold Tales of Nezumi Kozo and Historical Men (1)"), Yomiuri Shimbunsha, 1985-11
- (ge) Nezumi Kozō to rekishijō no otokotachi ibu (夢と承知で 下 鼠小僧と歴史上の男たち異聞; "Untold Tales of Nezumi Kozo and Historical Men (2)"), 1985-11
  - Kobunsha Bunko format
- (jō) Nezumi Kozō to Tōyama Kinshirō (夢と承知で 上 鼠小僧と遠山金四郎; " Nezumi Kozo and Toyama Kinshiro (1)"), Kobunsha Bunko, 1991-11
- (ge) Nezumi Kozō to Tōyama Kinshirō (夢と承知で 下 鼠小僧と遠山金四郎; "Nezumi Kozo and Toyama Kinshiro (2)"), 1991-11

==== Jigoku no Tatsu series ====
1. Jigoku no Tatsu muzan torimonohikae: Kubinashi jizō wa katarazu (地獄の辰・無残捕物控 首なし地蔵は語らず; "Tatsu from Hell's Brutality Casebook: The Headless Jizo will not Talk"), Kappa Novels, 1972
2. Jigoku no Tatsu muzan torimonohikae: Okappiki ga jūji wo suteta (地獄の辰無残捕物控 続 岡っ引きが十手を捨てた; "The okappiki Relinquished his Jutte tool"), 1972
3. Tōkaido burai-tabi (東海道・無頼旅; "Ruffian's Journey along Tokaido Highway"), 1976
- Kobunsha Bunko fo
1. Kubinashi jizō wa katarazu, Kobunsha Bunko, 1985-11
2. Okappiki ga jūji wo suteta, 1985-12
3. Asu wa meido ka Kyo nō yume ("Dream of Hell or Kyoto Tomorrow"), 1986-06
- Shodensha Bunko format
1. Jigoku no Tatsu hankachō (地獄の辰犯科帳; "Tatsu from Hell's Crime Record Files", 1999-04) , Shodensha Bunko
2. Jigoku no Tatsu muzanchō (地獄の辰無残帳; "Tatsu from Hell's Brutality Notebook", 1999-09)
3. Jigoku no Tatsu hidōchō (地獄の辰非道帳; "Tatsu from Hell's Atrocity Notebook", 1999-12)

==== Hanmi no Okon series ====
1. Hanmi no Okon 1: Ourami mōshimasen (半身のお紺 1 お怨み申しません; "I. I Will Tell no Gripe"), Kodansha, 1974
2. Hanmi no Okon 2: Sadame ga nikui (半身のお紺 2 さだめが憎い; "II. Hating Destiny"), 1974
3. Hanmi no Okon 3: Samete uzukimasu (半身のお紺 3 醒めて疼きます; "III. Sobering up and Throbbing"), 1975
- Kobunsha Bunko format
1. Onna mushukuin, Hanmi no Okon: Ourami mōshimasen (女無宿人・半身のお紺 お怨み申しません; "Female Vagabond Hanmi no Okon: I Will Tell no Gripe"), 1986-11
2. Onna mushukuin, Hanmi no Okon: Sadame ga nikui (女無宿人・半身のお紺 さだめが憎い; "Female Vagabond Hanmi no Okon: Hating Destiny"), 1986-12
3. Onna mushukuin, Hanmi no Okon: Samete uzukimasu (女無宿人・半身のお紺 醒めて疼きます; "Female Vagabond Hanmi no Okon: Sobering up and Throbbing"), 1987-01
- Shodensha Bunko series
1. Hanmi no Okon: Onna mushukuin hijō tabi (半身のお紺 女無宿人非情旅; "Hanmi no Okon: Female Vagabond's Merciless Journey"), Kobunsha Bunko, 2000–06
2. Hanmi no Okon: Onna mushukuin muzan ken (半身のお紺 女無宿人無残剣; "Hanmi no Okon: Female Vagabond's Brutal Sword"), 2000–08
3. Hanmi no Okon: Onna mushukuin aizōkō (半身のお紺 女無宿人愛憎行; "Hanmi no Okon: Female Vagabond's Merciless Journey"), 2001–06

Itako no Itaro series

1. Itako no Itarō: Ōtone no yami ni kieta (潮来の伊太郎 大利根の闇に消えた; "Itako no Itarō: Disappeared into the Great Tone River's Darkness"), Yomiuri Shimbunsha, 1975
2. Itako no Itarō: Kettō Hakone-yama Sanmai-bashi (潮来の伊太郎 決闘・箱根山三枚橋; "Duel at Sanmai Bridge, Mount Hakone"), 1975
- Kobunsha format
1. Itako no Itarō: Ōtone no yami ni kieta, 1982-08
2. Itako no Itarō: Kettō Hakone-yama Sanmai-bashi, 1982-10
- Tokuma Bunko format
1. Ōtone no yami ni kieta, 1988-06
2. Kettō Hakone-yama Sanmai-bashi, 1988-07

The Banished One
Kuki Shinjūrō series

1. Edo no yūgiri ni kiyu: tsuihōsha Kuki Shinjūrō (江戸の夕霧に消ゆ 追放者・九鬼真十郎; "Vanished in Edo's Evening Fog: The Banished One, Kuki Shinjūrō"), Toen Shobo, 1978-08
2. Bijo ka kitsune ka tōge michi (美女か狐か峠みち 追放者・九鬼真十郎; "The Beauty or the Fox or the Mountain Pass Road"), 1979
- Tokuma Bunko version
1. Edo no yūgiri ni kiyu, 1989-05
2. Bijo ka kitsune ka tōge michi, 1989-06

==== Mushukunin Mikogami no Jokichi ====
1. Mushukunin Mikogami no Jōkichi jō, Volume 1, Kodansha, 1972
2. Mushukunin Mikogami no Jōkichi chū, Volume 2, 1972
3. Mushukunin Mikogami no Jōkichi ge-no-ichi, Volume 3. Part 1, 1973
4. Mushukunin Mikogami no Jōkichi ge-no-ni, Volume 3. Part 2, 1973
- Tokuma Bunko format
1. "Volume 1", Tokuma Bunko, 1987-10
2. "Volume 2", 1987-11
3. "Volume 3", 1987-12
4. "Volume 4", 1988-01

==== Otonashi Gen's Casebook ====
Otonashi Gen torimonochō: rensaku jidai suiri shōsetsu (音なし源捕物帳 連作時代推理小説; "Otonashi Gen's Casebook: Series Period Mystery Novels", 1979-02), Kobunsha

- Fujimi Shobo
1. 1 Hanayome kyōran (音なし源捕物帳 1 花嫁狂乱; "Bride's Frenzy"), Jidai Shosetsu Bunko, 1987-12
2. 1 Tōjiba no onna (音なし源捕物帳 2 湯治場の女; "The Woman at the Hot Spring Spa"), 1988-02
3. 2 Nusumareta kataude (音なし源捕物帳 3 盗まれた片腕; "The Stolen Arm"), 1988-03
4. 4 Neko no yūrei (音なし源捕物帳 4 猫の幽霊; "The Cat's Specter"), 1988-04
5. 5 Ukiyoe no onna (音なし源捕物帳 5 浮世絵の女; "The Ukiyo-e Woman"), 1988-05
- Shodensha format
1. Yamigarinin hankachō (闇狩り人犯科帳; "Darkness Hunter's Casebook"), Non Pochette Bunko, 1996-12
2. Yamigarinin hankachō: nusumareta kataude-hen (闇狩り人犯科帳 盗まれた片腕編; "Darkness Hunter's Casebook anthology"), 1997-07
3. Azawarau haka-hen (闇狩り人犯科帳 嘲笑う墓編; "The Mocking Graves anthology"), 1997-12
4. Ukiyoe no onna, 1998-06

==== Himeshiro Nagaretabi series ====
1. Tōkaidō tsumujikaze Himeshiro Nagaretabi (東海道つむじ風 姫四郎流れ旅; "Tokaido (Road)'s Whirlwind: Himeshiro's Wandering Journey"), Kofudo Shuppan, 1980-10
2. Nakasendō haguredori (中仙道はぐれ鳥 姫四郎流れ旅; "Nakasendo (Road)'s Stray Bird"), 1980-11
3. Kōshūdō shiguregasa (甲州道しぐれ笠 姫四郎流れ旅; "Koshu Road's Rain-soaked Kasa-hat"), 1981-01
4. Nikkōdō kuruibana (日光道狂い花 姫四郎流れ旅; "Nikko Road's Crazy Flower"), 1981-01
5. Urakaidō katawarezuki (裏街道片われ月 姫四郎流れ旅; "The Byroad's Broken-off Moon"), 1982-07
- Himeshiro's Medicinal Art Travels
1. Kaei ni-nen no teiōsekkai (嘉永二年の帝王切開; "The Kaei 2 Caesarian Section"), Tokuma Bunko, 1990-03
2. Kaei san-nen no zenshinmasui (嘉永三年の全身麻酔; "The Kaei 3 Total Anesthesia"), 1990-04
3. Kaei yo-nen no yobōsesshu (嘉永四年の予防接種; "The Kaei 4 Vaccination"), 1990-05
4. Kaei go-nen no jinkōkokyū (嘉永五年の人工呼吸; "The Kaei 5 Artificial Respiration"), 1990-06
5. Kaei roku-nen no arukōru chūdoku (嘉永六年のアルコール中毒; "The Kaei 6 Alcoholism"), 1990-07

==== Haiku-Poet Issa's Casebook ====
- Haijin Issa torimonochō Namida no yajirobē (俳人一茶捕物帳 涙の弥次郎兵衛; "Haiku-poet Issa's Casebook: Yajirobei of Tears"9), Kobunsha, 1989-0
- Aoi haru no ame shin Issa torimonochō (青い春の雨 新・一茶捕物帳; "A Blue Spring Rain: Issa's New Casebook"), Kadokawa Shoten, 1991-10
  - Kadokawa Bunko format
- Shin Issa torimonochō mikazuki ni naku (新・一茶捕物帳 三日月に哭く; "Issa's New Casebook: Crying at the Crescent-moon"), 1993-01
- Shin Issa torimonochō aoi haru no ame (新・一茶捕物帳 青い春の雨; "Issa's New Casebook: A Blue Spring Rain"), 1993-11
  - Kobunsha Bunko format
- Haijin Issa torimonochō yeasegaeru no maki (俳人一茶捕物帳 瘦蛙の巻; "Book of the Emaciated Frog"), Kobunsha Bunko, 1995-05
- Haijin Issa torimonochō meigetsu no maki (俳人一茶捕物帳 名月の巻; "Book of the Harvest Moon"), 1996-01
  - Keibunsha Bunko format
- Keibusha Bunko, 2001–03
  - Kosaido Bunko format
- Kōsaidō Bunko, 2004–05

==== Genpaku and Utamaro's Casebook ====
- Genpaku Utamaro torimonochō (玄白歌麿捕物帳; "Genpaku and Utamaro's Casebook"), Kobunsha Bunko, 1993-02
- Jigoku no onna-goroshi Genpaku Utamaro torimonochō (地獄の女殺し 玄白歌麿捕物帳; "The Hellish Woman-killing"), 1995-09

==== Otasuke Doshin series ====
Otasuke Doshin or the "Helpful Doshin-Detective"

- Otasuke Dōshin junkaibo (お助け同心巡廻簿; "Otasuke Doshin Patrols Notebook"), Sankei Shimbun Seikatsu Joho Center, 1992-10
  - Non Pochette Bunko format
- Hatchōbori: Otasuke Dōshin hibun fugi mittsū chō (八丁堀・お助け同心秘聞 不義密通編; "Hatchobori Otasuke Doshin's Secret Tales: The Immoral Adultery anthology"), Non Pochette (Shobunsha imprint), 1995-10
- Hatchōbori: Otasuke Dōshin hibun gojōhō yaburi (八丁堀・お助け同心秘聞 御定法破り編; "Hatchobori Otasuke Doshin's Secret Tales: The Lawbreaker anthology), 1996-02

==== Misc. ====
- Yuki ni chiru Ōshūji (雪に花散る奥州路; "Oshu Province Road where Flowers Scatter on Snow"), Bungeishunjū, 1971
- Senran Nihon no rekishi (戦乱 日本の歴史; "War-turmoil History of Japan"), Shogakukan, 1977
  - Bunshun Bunko format 1982-01
- JIgoku wo waraku Nikkōji (地獄を嗤う日光路; "Nikko Road Laughing at Hell"), Bungeishunjū, 1972
  - Bunshun Bunko format 1982-04
- Sasurai kaidō (さすらい街道; "Wandering Highway"), Kodansha, 1972
  - KobunshaBunko format 1988-08
- Kenki shūshū (剣鬼啾々; "Sword-Demon Sobbing"), Bungeishunjū, 1976
  - Bunshun Bunko format 1987-11/Tokuma Bunko format 2002-07
- Kenshi moetsukite shisu ningen Okita Sōji (剣士燃え尽きて死す 人間・沖田総司; "Swordsman Burns Down and Dies: Okita Soji the Human"), Shinchosha, 1976
  - ShinchoBunko format 1984-01
- Shin Ōoka seidan (新大岡政談; "New Tales of Ooka's Rulings"), Shinchosha, 1979-01
  - ShinchoBunko format 1984-09
- Ōedo burai (大江戸無頼; "The Great Edo's Ruffian", 1980-05) Kosaido Shuppan
  - Hatamoto yakko ichidai (旗本奴一代; "A Hatomodo-man of a Generation"), Shincho Bunko, 1988–12. Retitled from Ōedo burai.
- Dōshin Akatsuki Rannosuke Edo-ki no hōritsu torimonochō (同心暁蘭之介 江戸期の法律捕物控; "The Doshin Detective Akatsuki Rannnosuke: an Edo-Period Law Casebook"), Sankei Shuppan, 1982-04
  - Kitamachi bugyō jōmawari dōshin-hikae (北町奉行・定廻り同心控; "Kitamachi Magistarate's Jomawari-Doshin Detective's Casebook"), Non Pochette Bunko, 1988–11. Retitled from Dōshin Akatsuki Rannosuke Edo-ki no hōritsu torimono-hikae (同心暁蘭之介 江戸期の法律捕物控).
- Yabō shōgun (野望将軍; "Ambition's Shogun", 2 vols.), Shueisha, 1984-02
- Kyō mo mata yume Hirate Miki gaiden (今朝もまた夢 平手造酒外伝; "Today yet another Dream: Hirate Miki's Other Tales"), Yomiuri Shimbunsha, 1986
- Tenki hiken (天鬼秘剣; "Tenki's Secret Swordplay"), Shinchosha, 1988-11
  - Shincho Bunko format, 1991-09; Futabasha, 1997-05; Tokuma Bunko format, 2002-01
- Kansei; oniwaban hibun (寛政・お庭番秘聞; "Kansei Period: the Oniwaban Gardenkeeper-Agents' Secret Tales"), Non Pochette Bunko, 1988-03
- Bunsei: Hasshū mawari hiroku (文政・八州廻り秘録; "Bunsei Period: Secret Records of the Eight Provinces Patrol"), Non Pochette Bunko, 1988-05
- Gunshi Takenaka Hanbē (軍師竹中半兵衛; "Strategist Takenaka Hanbei"), Kadokawa Bunko, 1988-09
- Bunkyū: Shimizu no Komasa buraiken (文久・清水の小政無頼剣; "Bunkyu Period: Shimizu no Komasa's Ruffian Sword"), Non Pochette Bunko, 1989-04
- Hana ochiru chishō Akechi Mitsuhide (花落ちる 智将・明智光秀; "Bloom Fallen: the Resourceful General Akechi Mitsuhide", 1989-09), Shincho Bunko
- Issen kiro, ken ga hashiru (一千キロ、剣が疾る; "One Thousand Kilometers, The Sword Dashes"), Kobunsha, 1990-10
  - Jiki bikyaku hashiru (直飛脚疾る; "The Direct Courier Dashes", retitled), Kobunsha Bunko, 1999-02
- Asai Nagamasa no ketsudan: (浅井長政の決断 賢愚の岐路; "Azai Nagamasa's Decision: Forkpath of Wisdom and Folly"), Kadokawa Bunko, 1990-10
- Kyōran Haru no yoru no yume. Matsuo Bashō to Yaoya Oshichi (狂乱 春の夜の夢 松尾芭蕉と八百屋お七; "Madness, a Spring Night's Dream: Matsuo Basho and Yaoya O-Shichi"), Kobunsha Bunko, 1992-10
- Iemitsu bōsatsu: Tōkaidō no kōbō jūgonichi (家光謀殺 東海道の攻防十五日; "The Iemitsu Assassination: Fifteen Days of Defense and Offense along Tokaido"), Bungeishunjū, 1993-03
  - Bunshun Bunko format, 1996-03; Kobunsha Bunko format, 2000–05
- Ieyasu chūsatsu shimatsu-ki (家康誅殺始末記; "Ieyasu's Punishment by Death, the Chronicles of the Affair"), Futabasha, 1994-12
  - Futaba novels edition 1997-05
- Nyonin seppuku (女人切腹; "Lady-folk's Harakiri"), Kobunsha Bunko, 1995-01
- Kobayakawa Hideaki no higeki (小早川秀秋の悲劇; "Kobayakawa Hideaki's tragedy"), Futabasha,, 1997-10
  - Futaba novels edition 1997-05
  - Futaba Bunko format 2000-06
- Ofudōsan Kinuzō torimonochō (お不動さん絹蔵捕物帖; "Ofudosan Kinuzo's Casebook"), Kobunsha, 2000–04
  - Bunshun Bunko format, 1996-03; Kobunsha Bunko format, 2005-01
- Jōmawari-dōshin nazotoki-hikae (定廻り同心 謎解き控; "A Jomawari-Doshin Detective's Puzzle-solving Notebook"), Shodensha Bunko, 2001-01
- Jōmawari-dōshin saigo no nazotoki (定廻り同心 最後の謎解き; "A Jomawari-Doshin Detective's Final Puzzle-solving"), Shodensha Bunko, 2002–12
- Kaizokusen Yūrei-maru (海賊船幽霊丸; "The Pirate Ship Yurei-maru"), Kobunsha, 2003–10
  - Kobunsha Bunko format, 2006-03

=== Autobiography ===
- Shijin no ie (詩人の家; "A Poet's house"), 1978

=== Essays ===
- Aishikata aisarekata no himitsu (愛し方愛され方の秘密; "The Secret to Loving and Being Loved"), Shodensha, 1978
- Asu wa waga mi kokoro aru oya no tame ni (明日はわが身 心ある親のために; "Tomorrow It Will Befall Me: For Parents with a Conscience"), Inner Trip, 1981
- Sonna koi nara yamenasai (そんな恋ならやめなさい; "If that's the Kind of Love, You Should Quit"); Part2; Part3. PHP, 1990; 1991; 1993
- Muchi seizōgyō Nihon kabushikigaisha (無知製造業・日本株式会社; "The Ignorance Manufacturing Industry, Japan, Inc."), Kadokawa, 1990
- Gan mo jibun inochi wo ikikiru boku no gan kokufuku-ki (ガンも自分 いのちを生ききる 僕のガン克服記; "Cancer is part of me: Living out Life to the Fullest. My Chronicle of Surmounting Cancer"), Kayryusha, 1994

== Adaptations ==
=== Films ===
- Kogarashi monjirō (木枯し紋次郎; "Kogarashi Monjiro", 1972), Toei, starring Bunta Sugawara.
- Kogarashi monjirō: kakawari gozansen (木枯らし紋次郎 関わりござんせん; "Kogarashi Monjiro: It's nothing to do with me", 1972), Toei, starring Bunta Sugawara.
- Kaettekita Kogarashi Monjirō (帰って来た木枯し紋次郎; "The Return of Kogarashi Monjiro", 1993), Toho, starring Atsuo Nakamura.
- Mushukunin Mikogami no Jōkichi: Kiba wa hikisaita (無宿人御子神の丈吉 牙は引き裂いた; "Drifter Mikogami no Jokichi: The Fangs Did Tear Apart", Eng. Title The Trail of Blood, 1972), Toho, starring Yoshio Harada.
- Mushukunin Mikogami no Jōkichi: Kawakaze ni kako wa nagareta (無宿人御子神の丈吉 川風に過去は流れた; "Drifter Mikogami no Jokichi: In the River-Wind Did the Past Flow Away", Eng. Title The Fearless Avenger, 1972), Toho, starring Yoshio Harada.
- Mushukunin Mikogami no Jōkichi: Tasogare ni senkō ga tonda (無宿人御子神の丈吉 黄昏に閃光が飛んだ; "Drifter Mikogami no Jokichi: In the Twilight Sparks Did Fly", Eng. Title Slaughter in the Snow, 1973), Toho, starring Yoshio Harada.
- Akuma no heya (悪魔の部屋; "Demon's Room", 1982), Nikkatsu, starring Reiko Nakamura.

=== TV Dramas ===
==== TV series ====
- Kogarashi Monjirō (木枯し紋次郎; "Kogarashi Monjiro", 1972), Fuji TV.
- Zoku Kogarashi Monjirō (続・木枯し紋次郎; "Kogarashi Monjiro, the Continuation", 1972-73), Fuji TV.
- Shin Kogarashi Monjirō (新・木枯し紋次郎; "The New Kogarashi Monjiro", 1977-78), Tokyo 12 Channel Television.
- Sasazawa Saho matatabi sirīzu (笹沢左保 股旅シリーズ; "Sasazawa Saho's Matatabi Series", 1972, Fuji TV). Toge/Mountain Pass series. (Note: Episodes: Nakayama-tōge ni jigoku wo mita (中山峠に地獄を見た; "At Nakayama Pass, Witness to Hell"); Kuresaka-tōge e no shissō (暮坂峠への疾走; "To Kuresaka Pass Sprinting"); Onikubi-tōge ni suteta suzu (鬼首峠に棄てた鈴; "At Onikubi Pass, the Little Bells Cast Away")) Adapted from chapters in Mikaeri tōge no rakujitsu (1970).
- Jigoku no Tatsu torimonohikae (地獄の辰捕物控; "Tatsu from Hell's Casebook", 1972-73), NET.
- Hasshū hankachō (八州犯科帳; "Eight Provinces Casebook", 1974), Fuji TV.
- Dōshin Akatsuki Rannosuke (同心暁蘭之介; 1981-82), Fuji TV.
- Onna mushukunin Hanmi no Okon (女無宿人 半身のお紺; "Hanmi no Okon", 1991), TV Tokyo.
- Otasuke dōshin ga iku (お助け同心が行く!; "The Helpful Doshin Goes Forth", 1993), TV Tokyo.

==== One-off /Single episode ====
- Himeshirō nagaretabi (姫四郎流れ旅; "Himeshiro's Drifting Journey", 1982), Fuji TV.
- Otonashi Gen Sanojigoroshi (音なし源 さの字殺し; "Soundless Gen: The Letter Sa Murder", 1983), Fuji TV.
- Uragiri no hōshū Tsuihōsha Kuki Shinjūrō (裏切りの報酬 追放者・九鬼真十郎; "Payment for Betrayal: The Banished One, Kuki Shinjuro", 1983, Fuji TV, starring Shigeru Tsuyuguchi)
- Yume to shōchi de Nezumi kozō Ōedo seishunezu (夢と承知で 鼠小僧大江戸青春絵図; "Full Knowing it's a Dream: Nezumi Kozo's Great Edo Adolescence Painting", 1988), NTV.
- Takushī doraibā no suiri nisshi (タクシードライバーの推理日誌; lit. "Taxi Driver's Deduction Journal", also given as "Taxi Driver's Mystery Diary", 1992–2016), TV Asahi, starring Tsunehiko Watase. (Note: Final episode #39 aired in 2016.)
- Iemitsu bōsatsu Sandai shōgun ni semaru nazo no ansatsu gundan! (家光謀殺 三代将軍に迫る謎の暗殺軍団!; "The Iemitsu Assassination: The Mysterious Assassin Squad Closes in on the Third Shogun!", 1995), TV Asahi.
- Yama-yuri satsujin jiken (山百合殺人事件; "Mountain Lily Murder Case"). Original screenplay to Ninjōkeiji Miyamoto Seishirō: Shi wo maneku yama-yuri (人情刑事・宮本清四郎 死を招く山百合; "The Soft-hearted Detective Kiyoshiro Miyamoto: The Mountain Lily that Invites Death", 2005, TV Tokyo). (Note: Originally ran as an episode on the Onna to ai to misterii (女と愛とミステリー; "Woman and Love and Mystery") series on 27 March 2005), TV Tokyo.
- Kogarashi Monjirō (木枯し紋次郎; 2009), Fuji TV starring, Yosuke Eguchi.
- Onna torishirabekan (女取調官; "Lady Interrogating Officer", 2011), TBS.

== Manga adaptations ==
- Kogarashi Monjirō (木枯し紋次郎), artwork by Goseki Kojima, Geibunsha, 1973. (Note: Reprinted LEED, 2018. and available as online version.)
- Jigoku no Tatsu torimono-hikae (地獄の辰捕物控; "Tatsu from Hell's Casebook"), artwork by Takeshi Kanda, Jitsugyo no Nihon Sha, 2004.
- Sanada jūyūshi (真田十勇士; "Sanada Ten Braves"), artwork by Kenji Okamura, LEED, 2016.
- Ginrō ni kodoku wo mita (銀狼に孤独をみた; "In the Silverwolf was Beheld his Loneliness"), artwork by Kaiji Kawaguchi, adapted by Sentaro Kubota, Ohzora Comics, 2007. From the Itako no Itaro series.
