= The Master Key (Togawa novel) =

Book summary

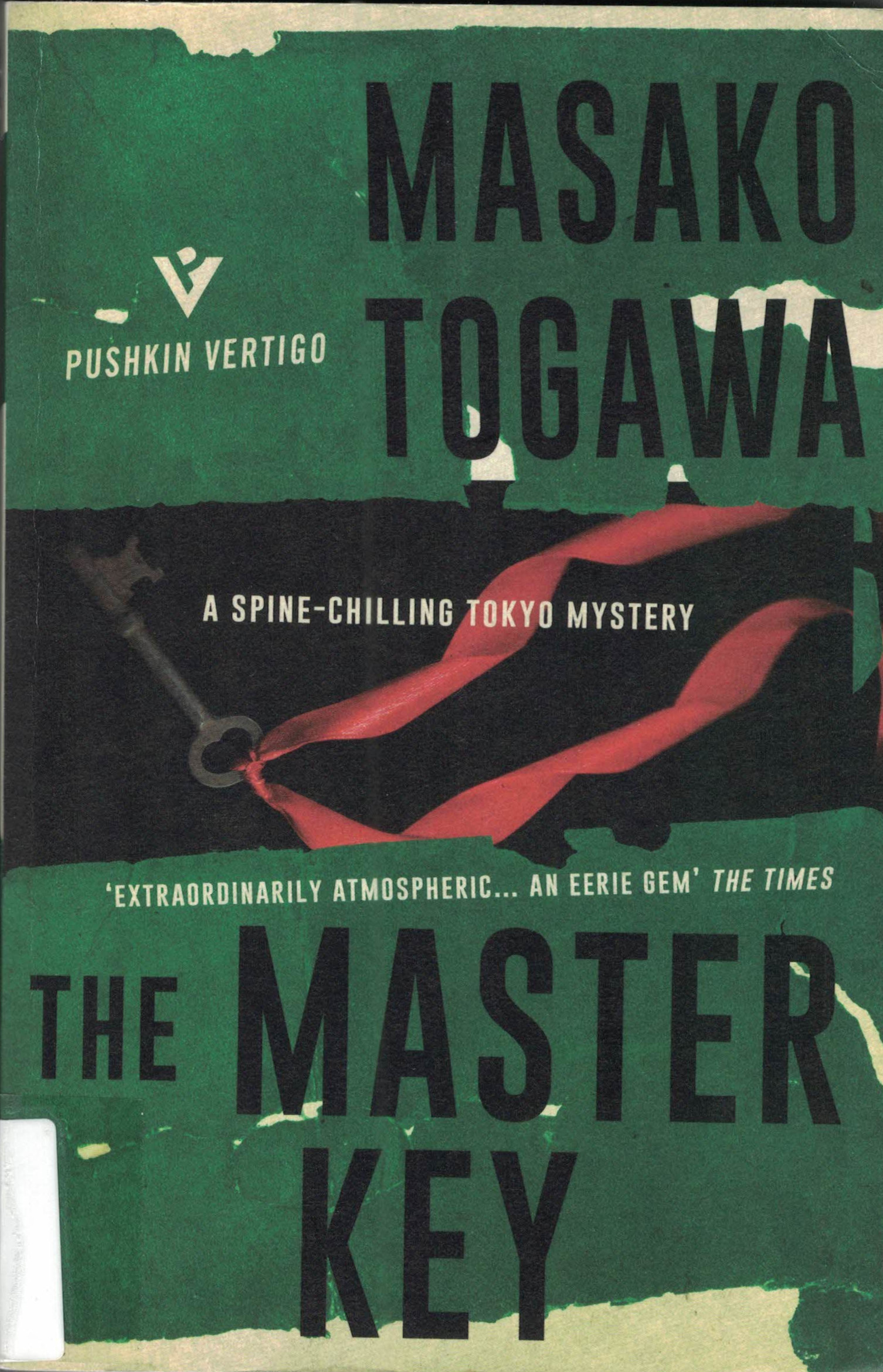
publ. Pushkin Vertigo

The Master Key (大いなる幻影, Ōinaru gen'ei) is a 1962 novel by the Japanese novelist Masako Togawa which received the Edogawa Rampo Prize upon publication. The English translation by Simon Grove was first published by Dodd, Mead & Co in 1985.

It is a mystery story set in the 1950's postwar Ikebukuro, Japan with the setting of K Apartment for Ladies, reserved only for women. Many of the aging residents have their own secrets bound to the master key, which opens all of the 150 rooms in the K Apartment. All the secrets start to unravel when the building is slated for construction work to be moved four meters with the residents inside.

== Characters ==
Major Characters:

- Katsuko Tojo/Haru Santo - older receptionist with a limp/white haired mysterious resident.
- Kaneko Tamura - younger receptionist.
- Chikako Ueda - previous school teacher who waits for her dead husband.
- Toyoto Munekata - professor guarding her dead husband's manuscripts.
- Noriko Ishiyama - eccentric woman known to other residents as Ms. Bladderwrack who forages for fishbones at night.
- Suwa Yatabe - violinist who previously stole a Guarnerius violin from her teacher.
- Yoneko Kimura - retired school teacher who writes letters to her previous students.

Minor Characters:

- Yasuyo Aoki - mysterious guest of Chikako Ueda.
- Keiko Kawauchi (Mrs. Kraft) - divorced from Major Kraft after disappearance of their son.
- Major D. Kraft - U.S. Army major who returned to the U.S. after divorce from Keiko Kawauchi.
- George Kraft - son of Major Kraft, reported kidnapped and missing.
- Priest - leader of the Three Spirit Faith cult, performs seemingly miraculous revelations.
- Thumbelina the Vestal - small statured woman who is the medium of the séance.

== Translation ==
- Togawa, Masako. The Master Key. Translated by Grove, Simon. Dodd, Mead & Co. ISBN 9781782273639
