= Tomomi Sato =

Japanese actress

Sato Tomomi
- 佐藤 友美
- Born: October 8, 1941 (age 83); Nagoya, Aichi Prefecture, Japan
- Occupation: Actress
- Years active: 1967–present
- Known for: Mominoki wa Nokotta; Otokotachi ni Yoroshiku; Shichinin no onna bengoshi; Tokyo Megure Keishi

Tomomi Sato (佐藤 友美, Sato Tomomi, born October 8, 1941) is a Japanese actress.

== Biography ==
She was born in Nagoya, Aichi Prefecture, Japan. She attended Kinjo Gakuin University junior college, but eventually dropped out. She is a natori (Japanese equivalent of "Master's degree" in Japanese classical dance) of the Japanese dance Nagoya Nishikawa.

She attended the Haiyuza Theatre Company (with Toshiyuki Hosokawa, Tetsuo Ishidate, Orie Sato, Katsutoshi Shin, Mieko Yuki, Junko Maya, among others). Thereafter she joined the theater company Sankikai, and signed a contract with Shochiku.

From November 1969, she succeeded Mitsuko Baisho, serving as the hostess of the TV Night Show (Fuji TV) until March 1970. In 1978 she portrayed "Madame Maigret" in the Japanese TV series Tokyo Megure Keishi, based on Georges Simenon's Jules Maigret. For her portrayal of Mrs. Maigret in this series, she was praised by Simenon himself, who considered her "Madame Maigret" the best he had ever seen.

Sato has appeared in many movies and television series, and is well known for her beauty and voice. Her role in Please say hello to men is representative of her work.

When she was 38 years old, she was interviewed by the Asahi Shimbun, and it then turned out that it had been incorrectly written that she was 48 years old in her biography. A corrected version was published immediately thereafter. She also ended up writing an article in a weekly magazine where she wrote that she was an "actress who had the Asahi Shimbun of Japan correct her."

== Personal life ==
Her blood type is O. She is 1.65 m (5 ft 5 in) tall. In 1969, her three sizes were B85cm, W58cm, H88cm.

== Filmography ==
=== Film ===
| Year | Title | Role | Director | Notes |
|---|---|---|---|---|
| 1967 | Sasori | Yuki Yamane | Junzo Mizukawa | |
| 1967 | A Killer's Key | Hideko | Kazuo Mori | |
| 1968 | Kigeki ekimae kaiun | Tamiko Hayaska | Shirō Toyoda | |
| 1968 | Goke, Body Snatcher from Hell | Kazumi Asakura | Hajime Sato | |
| 1968 | Heitai Yakuza Gōdatsu | Yang Qiulan | Tokuzō Tanaka | |
| 1968 | Blackmail Is My Life | Otoki | Kinji Fukasaku | |
| 1969 | Nemuri Kyoshiro engetsu sappo | Oryou | Kazuo Mori | |
| 1969 | Kiri no barado | Kayo Aso | Meijiro Umezu | |
| 1971 | Chôeki Tarô: Mamushi no kyôdai | Sayako Kozuki | Sadao Nakajima | |
| 1971 | Amai himitsu | Yoko Kozue | Kōzaburō Yoshimura | |
| 1973 | Lone Wolf and Cub: Baby Cart in the Land of Demons | "Quick Change" Oyô | Kenji Misumi | |
| 1974 | Izu no Odoriko | Chiyoko | Katsumi Nishikawa | |
| 1979 | Hell | Nun | Tatsumi Kumashiro | |
| 1986 | Oedipus no yaiba | Kyoko Osako | Tôichirô Narushima | |
| 1998 | Diary of Early Winter Shower | Keiko Mibu | Shinichiro Sawai | |

=== TV drama ===
| Year | Title | Role | Network | Notes |
|---|---|---|---|---|
| 1966 | Toshiko | Iwamura | TBS | |
| 1969 | Majin banda | | CX | |
| 1969 | Purofaitā | Yuri Arisawa | NTV | Main cast |
| 1969 | Onihei Hankacho | Omon | NET/Toho | Episode 36 |
| 1970 | Mito Kōmon | Oryu | TBS/CAL | Season 1, episode 31 |
| 1970 | Mominoki wa Nokotta | Miya, Takio | NHK | Taiga drama |
| 1970 | Gobanmenokeiji | Miyuki Osawa | NET/TOEI | Episode 14 |
| 1971 | Samuraihikyaku | Okon | NET/TOEI | Season 1, episode 31 |
| 1971 | Kayōbi no on'na shirīzu | | NTV | Films Black Picture Album and Hana wa mite ita |
| 1972 | Kayōbi no on'na shirīzu | | NTV | Aru Chō, totsuzen ni… |
| 1972 | Nyonin gensō | | NHK | |
| 1972 | Sasurainoōkami | | NET | Episode 6 |
| 1972 | Ninpōkagerōkiri | | KTV/TOEI | Episode 23 |
| 1972 | Nemuri Kyōshirō | | KTV/TOEI | Episode 3 |
| 1972 | Ōedo Sōsamō | Okoma | TV Tokyo | Episode 83 |
| 1973 | Kunitori Monogatari | | NHK | Taiga drama |
| 1974 | Hachi shū hankachō | Okinu | CX/CAL | Episode 6 |
| 1974 | Taiyō ni Hoero! | Yumiko | NTV/Toho | Episode 123 |
| 1975 | Hokutomonogatari | Akiko Kuzuhara | YTV | Main cast |
| 1975 | Kokoro no tabiji | Michiyo | NTV | Main cast |
| 1976 | Edo no Kaze | | CX/Toho | Season 2, episode 22: Yūdachi nyōbō |
| 1977 | Yokomizo Seishi shirîzu | Rika Aoike | MBS | |
| 1977 | Kogarashi Monjirō | Osumi | Fuji TV/CAL | Episode 9 |
| 1978 | Tokyo Megure Keishi | Mrs. Megure | TV Asahi | Main cast |
| 1979 | Kusa Moeru | Tokiwa Gozen | NHK | Taiga drama |
| 1980 | Mito Kōmon | Okinu | TBS/CAL | Episode 24: Osowa reta Chuuma kaidō - Nirasaki - |
| 1980 | POLA TV Shosetsu | Kikuyo Asakaze | TBS | Marī no sakura |
| 1980 | Edo no asayake | Ota | Fuji TV | Episode 9 |
| 1982 | Sarigenaku nikui yatsu | Yoko Kazami | MBS | Marī no sakura |
| 1982 | Matsudaira ukon jiken-chō | Ogin | NTV | Episode 9 |
| 1983 | Gisō kekkon | | TBS | |
| 1983 | Ōoku | Aguri | KTV | Episode 20 |
| 1983 | Kin'yōbinotsumatachihe | Mayumi Tamura | TBS | Main cast |
| 1983 | Akashi kanpei 35-sai | | NTV | Main cast |
| 1985 | Fūfu seikatsu | Michiko | TBS | Main cast |
| 1986 | Toki ni wa Issho ni | Yoko Mizutani | Fuji TV | Main cast |
| 1986 | Kayo Suspense Gekijyo | | NTV | Anata kara nogare rarenai |
| 1987 | Keshin | | Fuji TV | Main cast |
| 1987 | Otokotachiniyoroshiku | Takako Morohashi | TBS | Main cast |
| 1987 | Uogashimonogatari | Kayo | NHK | Main cast |
| 1988 | Kayo Suspense Gekijyo | | NTV | Ame no naka no on'na shikumareta jōji |
| 1990 | Gekai arimori saeko | Yoko Kasai | Nippon TV | TV series guest appearance and TV Special |
| 1991 | Asadora | Ranko Mimura | NHK | Kiminonaha |
| 1991 | Kayo Suspense Gekijyo | | NTV | Kūhaku no satsui |
| 1991 | Shichinin no onna bengoshi | Itsu Taniguchi | TV Asahi | Main cast |
| 1998 | Suiyō shirīzudorama | | NHK | Watashi no naka no dareka, Kaimonoizonshō no on'na-tachi |
| 1998 | Saturday Night at the Theater | | TV Asahi | Takushīdoraibā no suiri nisshi, episode 10: Kuroi himawari no on'na |
| 1999 | Asadora | | NHK | Suzuran |
| 2000 | Beautiful Life | | TBS | |
| 2001 | Moichido Kiss | Yoko Saegusa | NHK | Main cast |
| 2003 | Keiji chōsakan-dama Saka Miyako | Hatsue Tamasaka | Fuji TV | Main cast (7 episodes) |
| 2009 | Saturday Night at the Theater | Hisae Miura | TV Asahi | Takushīdoraibā no suiri nisshi, episode 25: Tōkyō 〜 Miyazaki Hyuuganada satsujin-ga no jōkyaku |
| 2009 | Ningen dōbu~tsuen | | Wowow | |

=== Other TV appearances ===
| Year | Title | Role | Network | Notes |
|---|---|---|---|---|
| 1974–1975 | Legacy for the Future | Gen'ei | NHK | Documentary |
| 2015 | Tetsuko's Room | Herself | TV Asahi | Talk show |
