= Katsu Ryuzaki =

Japanese actor (1940-1984)

- 竜崎勝
- Born: March 25, 1940; Kōchi, Kōchi Prefecture, Japan
- Died: December 18, 1984 (aged 44)
- Occupation: Actor
- Years active: 1961–1984
- Children: Go Takashima; Aya Takashima

Katsu Ryuzaki (竜崎 勝, Ryūzaki Masaru; March 25, 1940 – December 18, 1984) was a Japanese actor. His real name and former stage name is Fumiaki Takashima (Japanese: 高島 史旭; たかしま ふみあき). His eldest son is former actor Go Takashima, his eldest daughter is freelance announcer Aya Takashima, and his son-in-law is Yujin Kitagawa.

== Biography ==
Ryuzaki was born in Kōchi, Kōchi Prefecture, and graduated from the Faculty of Economics, Hosei University.

He became a student at the Bungakuza after going through the training school attached to the theater company Haiyuza. In 1963, he entered the Haiyuza Training School as a 15th class student, with Isao Natsuyagi, Komaki Kurihara, Yoshio Harada, Gin Maeda, Ryuzo Hayashi, Takeo Chii, Choei Takahashi, Taisaku Akino, Kenkichi Hamahata, Miyoko Akaza, Kiwako Taichi, Takehiko Ono, Kunio Murai, Akihiko Shibata, Shunsuke Mizoguchi, and others, who were later called Haiyuza hana no 15-kisei. He left Bungakuza without becoming a member of the theater company.

After a regular appearance in the TV drama Kanjuro Torimonocho (TBS) under his real name, he played the lead role of Yue Fujinami in the TV drama Kanjuro Torimonocho (TBS) and assumed the name Masaru Ryuzaki.

After adopting the name Masaru Ryuzaki, he has been active in daytime dramas (昼ドラ, Hidora) such as Ueru tamashi (1972, Fuji TV) and TV dramas such as Akai kutsu (1972, TBS).

In the late 1970s, he developed a stomach ulcer and recovered for a while, but in November 1984, he began to complain of poor physical condition. Thereafter his condition took a sudden turn for the worse, and he died of liver cirrhosis at 1:00 a.m. on December 18, 1984, at the National Hospital Organization Tokyo Medical Center. He died at the age of 44.

== Incomplete filmography ==
=== Film ===
- Prophecies of Nostradamus (1974), Daikon
- Mount Hakkoda (1977), Army surgeon Nagano

=== Television ===
- Taiga drama
  - Minamoto no Yoshitsune (1966), Fisherman of Kushizaki
  - Ryomagayuku (1968), Toranoshin Ikeda
  - Katsu Kaishū (1974), Eishiro Ozone
  - Genroku taihei-ki (1975), Gengo Otaka
  - Hana-shin (1977), Kondō Isami
  - Tōge no gunzō (1982), Ukyo Tamura
  - Tokugawa Ieyasu (1983), Niwa Nagahide
  - Sanga Moyu (1984), Lieutenant Hisanaga
- Three Outlaw Samurai (1967), Seishiro Naraki, 1 episode
- Mito Kōmon (1970–1975), 2 episodes
- Daichūshingura (1971), Sanpei Oishi
- Ronin of the Wilderness (1972–1974), 5 episodes
- Ōedo Sōsamō (1975–1984), 6 episodes
- The Water Margin (1973), Genryu, 1 episode
- Ultraman Taro (1973), Dr. Otani, 1 episode
- Edo o Kiru (1973), Heima Kadoya, 1 episode
- Nagasaki Hangachōu (1976), Gohei Kanameya, 1 episode
- Edo no Kaze (1978), 1 episode
- Kogarashi Monjirō (1978), Sanbonsugi no Chobee, 1 episode
- Tokyo Megure Keishi (1978), 1 episode
- Fumō Chitai (1979), Kamimori
- Pro Hunter (1981), Umino
- Taiyō ni Hoero! (1983), Shinji Shimada, 1 episode
