= Kazufumi =

- Gender: Male

Origin
- Origin: Japanese
- Meaning: Different meanings depending on the kanji used

Kazufumi (written: 和史 or 一文) is a masculine Japanese given name. Notable people with the name include:

- Kazufumi Miyazawa (宮沢 和史; born 1966), Japanese musician
- Kazufumi Sakai (坂井 和史; born 1947), Japanese basketball player
- Kazufumi Shiraishi (白石 一文; born 1958), Japanese writer
- Kazufumi Taniguchi (谷口 和史; born 1962), Japanese politician
