= Tobe Hissatsu Uragoroshi =

Japanese TV drama series

- Also known as: 翔べ! 必殺うらごろし
- Genre: Jidaigeki
- Directed by: Eiichi Kudo; Youichi Harada; MItsuyuki Kōsaka
- Starring: Atsuo Nakamura; Etsuko Ichihara; Shōhei Hino; Izumi Ayukawa; Akiko Wada
- Country of origin: Japan
- Original language: Japanese
- No. of episodes: 23

Production
- Producers: Hisashi Yamauchi; Rikyu Nakagawa; Yozō Sakurai
- Running time: 45 minutes (per episode)
- Production companies: Asahi Broadcasting Corporation; Shochiku

Original release
- Network: ANN (ABC, TV Asahi)
- Release: 1978 – 1979

Tobe Hissatsu Uragoroshi (翔べ! 必殺うらごろし) is a Japanese television jidaigeki or period drama, that was broadcast in 1978 to 1979. It is the 14th in the Hissatsu series. The drama depicts Paranormal events so totally different from past Hissastu series However, the audience rating was low and broadcast period was shortened.

== Cast ==
- Atsuo Nakamura as Sensei
- Etsuko Ichihara as Obasan
- Shōhei Hino as Shōjyu
- Akiko Wada as Waka
- Ayukawa Izumi as Onemu
