= Etsuko Ichihara =

Japanese actress (1936–2019)

- 市原 悦子
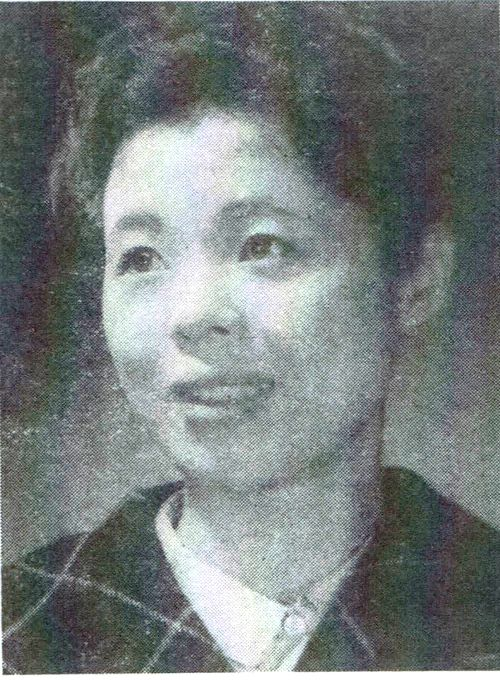
- Born: January 24, 1936; Chiba, Japan
- Died: January 12, 2019 (aged 82)
- Occupation: Actor
- Years active: 1957–2019

Etsuko Ichihara (市原 悦子, Ichihara Etsuko; 24 January 1936 – 12 January 2019) was a Japanese actress. She appeared in over one hundred films.

== Biography ==
Ichihara was a member of the Haiyuza theater troupe from 1957 to 1971. She won an award at the Geijutsusai in 1959 and became the star of Haiyuza. She narrated the long-running anime series Manga Nihon mukashi banashi. She won the Japan Academy Prize for Black Rain. Ichihara starred in Makoto Shinkai's anime film Your Name. She died of heart failure, aged 82.

== Filmography ==
=== Film ===
Year	Title	Role	Notes
1957	Snow Country	Kanpei	
1962	Burari Bura-bura Monogatari		
1965	Kiri no Hata		
1966	The Face of Another		
1967	Samurai Rebellion	Kiku	
1968	The Great Adventure of Horus, Prince of the Sun	Hilda	Voice
1970	Fuji sanchō		
1977	Barefoot Gen: Explosion of Tears		
1976	The Youth Killer	Jun's Mother	
1981	Buriki no kunsho		
1981	Kofuku		
1989	Black Rain	Shigeko Shizuma	Japan Academy Prize for Best Supporting Actress
1997	The Eel		
2006	The Ode to Joy		
2015	Sweet Bean	Yoshiko	
2016	Your Name	Hitoha Miyamizu	Voice
2017	Soap Bubble	Suma	

=== Television ===
Year	Title	Role	Notes
1978	Tokyo Megure Keishi		TV Drama series
1978–79	Tobe Hissatsu Uragoroshi		Hissatsu series
1975–94	Manga Nippon Mukashibanashi	Narrator	Animation series
1996	Hideyoshi	Naka	Taiga drama
