= Sen Fujimoto =

Sen Fujimoto (藤本泉; born February 15, 1923) was a Japanese novelist. She was best known for her Edogawa Rampo Prize-winning work Toki wo Kizamu Ushio (時を刻む潮).

== Biography ==
Fujimoto was born in Tokyo on February 15, 1923. She graduated from Nihon University. In 1966 her first literary work, Ouna Hanjoki (媼繁盛記), won the Shosetu Gendai Shinjin Award. Her 1976 Noroi no Seiiki (呪いの聖域) was nominated for the Naoki Prize, but did not win it. Her later novel Toki wo Kizamu Ushio (時を刻む潮) won the Edogawa Rampo Prize in 1977.

Fujimoto moved to Germany in 1986. After going to France in 1989, her whereabouts are unknown.

== Selected works ==
- Ouna Hanjoki (媼繁盛記), 1966
- Noroi no Seiiki (呪いの聖域), 1976
- Toki wo Kizamu Ushio (時を刻む潮), 1977
