= Niki Etsuko =

Japanese novelist (1928–1986)

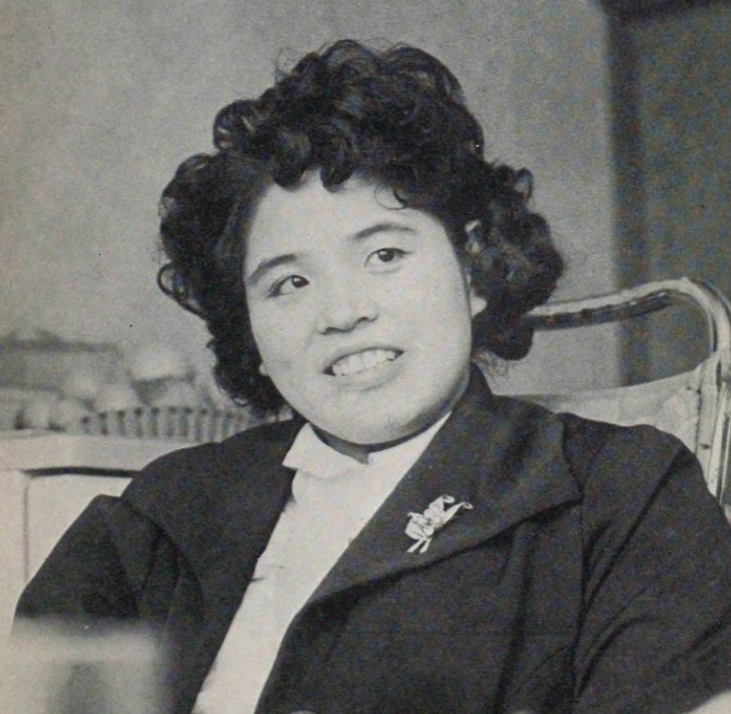
- Born: 1928; Tokyo, Japan
- Died: 1986 (aged 57–58)
- Occupation: Author
- Notable work: The Cat Knew (1957)
- Awards: Edogawa Rampo Prize (1957) Mystery Writers of Japan Award (1981)

Niki Etsuko (Japanese: 仁木悦子; 1928–1986) was a Japanese novelist, noted for becoming the first female Japanese writer of mystery fiction to achieve widespread recognition and commercial success.

Niki was born in Tokyo and began writing fiction after a childhood bout of polio left her unable to walk. In 1957, Niki's detective novel The Cat Knew received the Edogawa Rampo Prize for best mystery fiction and became a best-seller, breaking all sales records for Japanese detective novels. The book was credited for introducing a new style of detective story and making the genre more accessible to female audiences in Japan.

In 1981, Niki received a Mystery Writers of Japan Award for her short fiction.

== Early life ==
Niki Etsuko was born in 1928 in Tokyo, Japan. At the age of four, she became sick with polio and was left permanently unable to walk. She was subsequently tutored at home by her older brother. As she grew up, Niki wrote hundreds of stories, starting out with children's fiction before moving almost exclusively into the mystery genre.

== The Cat Knew ==
In 1957, Niki published her mystery novel Neko wa shitte ita (The Cat Knew), a story about two amateur detectives – a brother and sister, both students – who solve a series of murders at a local hospital. When the novel was awarded that year's Edogawa Rampo Prize for best mystery fiction, 29-year-old Niki became the center of media attention. While previous winners of the prize had been selected from the ranks of well-established authors for long-term achievements, 1957 was the first year judges had chosen a brand new work (and relatively obscure writer) to receive the honour. The judges commented on Niki's writing style:

While the main twists of the plot are not, perhaps, invariably original, yet there is a typical feminine attention to detail in the way the minor twists and tricks are handled. In this respect there is something reminiscent of Agatha Christie. The style is simple and fluent, and the scenes inside the hospital startled the judges with their sureness of touch.

Although other Japanese women writers had previously ventured into the mystery genre, Niki was the first to achieve widespread recognition and commercial success. The Cat Knew achieved record-breaking sales, becoming the first Japanese detective novel to sell more than 100,000 copies and reach the besuto sēra (best-seller) mark.

== Critical reception and analysis ==
One contemporary critic praised The Cat Knew for appealing to Japanese women readers, arguing that the book overturned women's traditional view of detective fiction as "too preposterous, or too gloomy, or too brutal" and instead opened up the genre to a new audience. Academic Kawatarō Nakajima wrote that Niki's novel had achieved its popularity through "its healthy delight in the pure pleasure of deduction, free from the murkiness and eroticism of the old-style detective story."

Scholars have noted that Niki's work was a key contribution to the development of "social detective fiction" in post-war Japan, which combined entertaining plot twists with more serious social criticism.

== Later life ==
Niki later married and assisted her husband with translation work. She continued with her own writing. In 1981, Niki received the Mystery Writers' of Japan Award for short fiction.

She died in 1986.

== Selected works ==
- Neko wa shitte ita (The Cat Knew), 1957
- Nendo no inu (A clay dog), 1958
- Hayashi no naka no ie (The house in the forest), 1959
- Futatsu no inga (Two negative pictures), 1964
