= Red Circle Authors =

British publishing house for Japanese fiction

Red Circle Authors is a British publishing house based in London that specialises in Japanese fiction.

== Origins ==
Red Circle Authors was set up in 2016, by Richard Nathan and Koji Chikatani, to showcase Japan's best creative writing. The Gutai group was the initial inspiration behind Red Circle Authors.

Members of the Red Circle Authors group include: Kazufumi Shiraishi, Randy Taguchi, Fuminori Nakamura, Kanji Hanawa, Mitsuyo Kakuta, Takuji Ichikawa, Soji Shimada and Roger Pulvers.

Currently, only a limited number of literary works by Red Circle's curated circle of authors are available outside Japan in translation. Despite this, many of Red Circle's authors have won literary awards in Japan including, for example, the Naoki Prize (Mitsuyo Kakuta 2005, Kazufumi Shiraishi in 2010) and the Akutagawa Prize (Fuminori Nakamura in 2005); and have had their works adapted for film and television in Japan.

Some of the group's authors already have well-established reputations in Asia (in China, Taiwan, Korea, and Thailand, for example) and are starting to win international literary prizes. Fuminori Nakamura, for instance, won the David L. Goodis Award in 2014.

== Imprint and series ==
Red Circle Authors' publishing imprints are Red Circle and Circle Editions.

Red Circle Authors launched this imprint and publishing programme on 23 November 2018 with the launch of its first series Red Circle Minis and the publication of its first three Minis:

Stand-In Companion by Kazufumi Shiraishi, Backlight by Kanji Hanawa and Tokyo Performance by Roger Pulvers

Commentators and reviewers said after their publications that the approach taken was "not about resizing big books into small objects, but rather about celebrating textual brevity in book form itself", a longtime tradition in Japan.

Complementing this launch series, Red Circle Authors also publishes the Circle Editions imprint. Circle Editions publishes books about, on, and from Japan, spanning Japanese literature, publishing and culture.

This imprint was launched in 2024 with the publication of Kaleidoscope Japan: A nation through the lens of literature, by one of the company’s co-founders, drawing on his experience within the world of Japanese letters.

== Activities ==
Red Circle Authors' activities are managed from London. The group also has an office in Tokyo. It promotes its select curated group of contemporary Japanese and Japan-based authors and their creative works to the international publishing industry and readers from these two locations.

In addition to its book publishing Red Circle publishes a magazine on its website, The Circle, which provides news, analysis and opinion on Japanese literature, writers, publishing, bookselling and culture.
