= Soji Shimada =

Japanese mystery writer (born 1948)

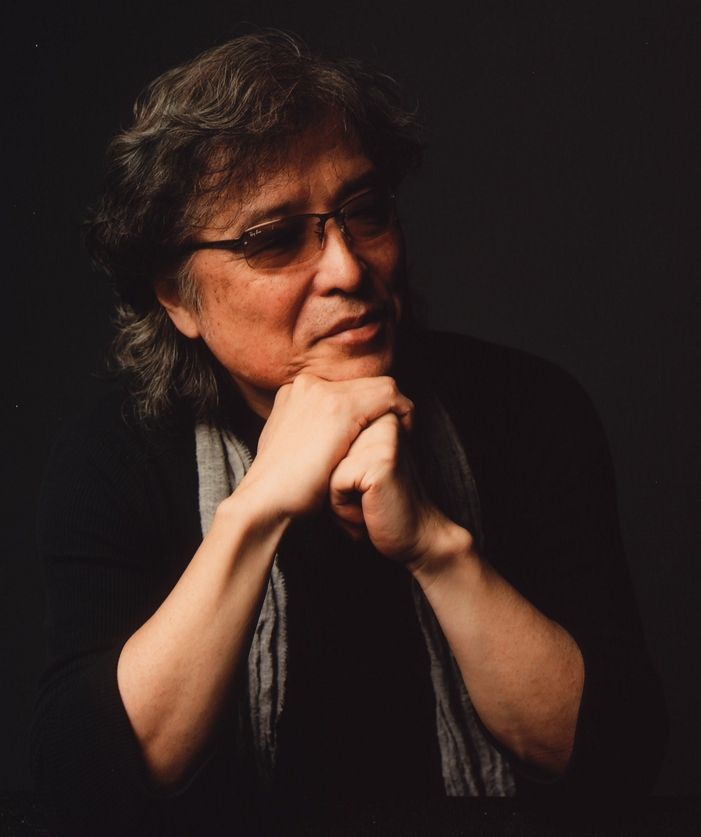
- Born: October 12, 1948 (age 78); Fukuyama City, Hiroshima Prefecture, Japan
- Occupation: Novelist
- Writing career
- Period: 1981–present
- Genre: Mystery fiction
- Notable work: The Detective Kiyoshi Mitarai series
- Website: WS Kan Soji Shimada Supervision Website

Signature
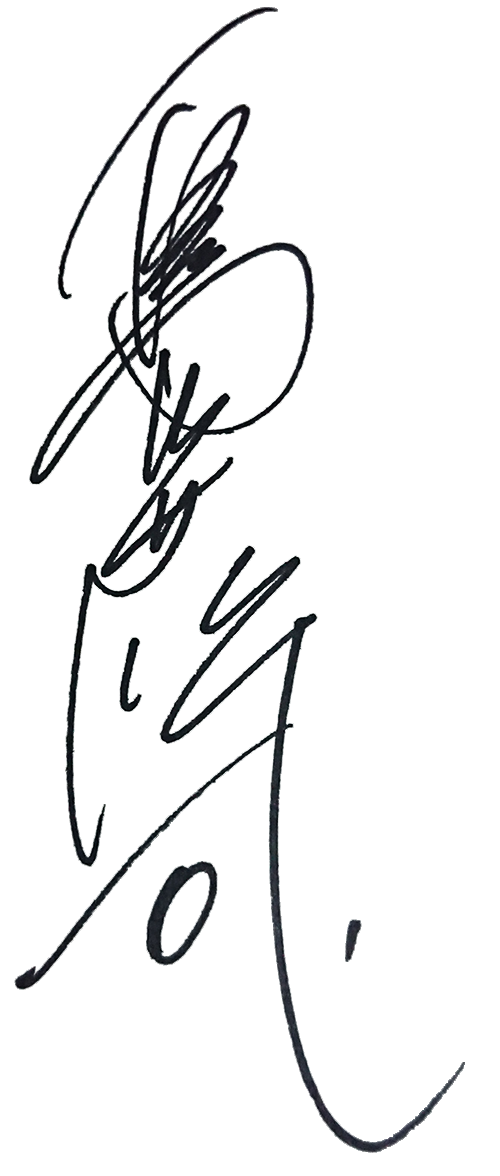

Soji Shimada (島田 荘司, Shimada Sōji; born October 12, 1948) is a Japanese mystery writer. He was born in Fukuyama City, Hiroshima Prefecture, Japan.

== Biography ==
Soji Shimada graduated from Seishikan High School in Fukuyama City, Hiroshima Prefecture, and later Musashino Art University as a Commercial arts design major.

After spending years as a dump truck driver, free writer, and musician, he made his debut as a mystery writer in 1981 when The Tokyo Zodiac Murders was shortlisted for the Edogawa Rampo Prize. His best-known works in Japan include the Detective Mitarai Series and the Detective Yoshiki Series. His works often involve themes such as the death penalty, Nihonjinron (his theory on the Japanese people), and Japanese and international culture. He is a strong supporter of amateur Honkaku (i.e. authentic, orthodox) mystery writers. Following the trend of Social School of crime fiction led by Seicho Matsumoto, he was the pioneer of "Shin-Honkaku" (New Orthodox) logic mystery genre. He bred authors such as Yukito Ayatsuji, Rintaro Norizuki and Shogo Utano, and he led the mystery boom from the late 1980s to present day. As the father of "Shin-Honkaku," Shimada is sometimes referred to as "The Godfather of Shin-Honkaku" or "God of Mystery.”

His humor mysteries such as Soseki and the London Mummy Murders and Let There Be Murder, Any Kind of Murder incorporate elaborate mysteries as well as elements of satire, confusion, youth, and survival.

In recent years, he has begun a new challenge—an animated series called the "Taiga Novels," collaborated with the renowned illustrator Masamune Shirow. Upon its kick-off in January 2008, he and Shirow plan to create a twelve-book series through the Kodansha BOX publishers. On top of the BOX, Shimada holds a column in the celebrated magazine, the Weekly Shincho. He is also heading two newly founded Amateur Mystery Novel contests—first, "The City of Roses Fukuyama Mystery Award" for amateur writers in Japan, and the "Soji Shimada Mystery Award" in Taiwan, sponsored by Crown Publishing company. In 2019 he joined the curated group of award-winning Japanese authors Red Circle Authors.

== Awards and nominations ==
Shimada has been nominated for numerous literature awards, but gained a growing reputation in his early career for consistently losing out. He was nominated for the Naoki Prize twice, in 1984 for "Soseki and the London Mummy Murders" and in 1985 for "Summer, 19-year-old portrait" (losing both awards). His books Murder in the Crooked Mansion and Water that the Dead Drink were submitted for the Edogawa Rampo Prize. Both failed to make the finalist list. In 1985, Shimada was nominated for the Yoshikawa Literature Newcomer Award for "Soseki and the London Mummy Murders". He was nominated for the Mystery Writers of Japan Award eight times in eight consecutive years, but this was declined by himself before the selection process. In 2005, his novel "The Phantom of the Skyscraper" was nominated for the Honkaku Mystery Award; he finished as runner-up.

Shimada's lack of awards led to him being referred to as the "uncrowned king".

In 2008, Shimada won the 12th Japan Mystery Literature Grand Prize.

In 2010, Shimada was again nominated for Honkaku Mystery Award for "Sharaku: Tojita Kuni no Maboroshi".

== Works in English translation ==
Novel

- The Tokyo Zodiac Murders (original title: Senseijutsu Satsujin Jiken), trans. Ross and Shika Mackenzie, IBC Publishing, 2004 ISBN 9784925080811 and, Pushkin Vertigo, 2015 ISBN 9781782271383
- Murder in the Crooked House (original title: Naname Yashiki no Hanzai), trans. Louise Heal Kawai, Pushkin Vertigo, 2019 ISBN 9781782274568
- One Love Chigusa, trans. David Warren, Red Circle Authors, 2020 ISBN 9781912864102

Short stories

- "The Locked House of Pythagoras" (original title: P no Misshitsu)
  - Ellery Queen's Mystery Magazine, August 2013
  - The Realm of the Impossible, Locked Room International, 2017, ISBN 978-1-5453-3922-0
- "The Executive Who Lost His Mind" (original title: Hakkyō-suru Jūyaku) (Ellery Queen's Mystery Magazine, August 2015)
- "The Running Dead" (Ellery Queen's Mystery Magazine, November–December 2017)

== Bibliography ==
=== Detective Kiyoshi Mitarai Series ===
- Novels
  - The Tokyo Zodiac Murders (占星術殺人事件, Senseijutsu Satsujin Jiken (1981 Kodansha Press))
  - Murder in the Crooked Mansion (斜め屋敷の犯罪, Naname Yashiki no Hanzai (1982 Kodansha Press))
  - The Knight Stranger (異邦の騎士, Iho no Kishi (1988 Kodansha Press))
  - The Cannibal Tree of Dark Hill (暗闇坂の人喰いの木, Kurayamizaka Hitokui No Ki (1990 Kodansha Press))
  - The Crystal Pyramid (水晶のピラミッド, Suisho no Pyramiddo (1991 Kodansha Press))
  - Vertigo (眩暈, Memai (1992 Kodansha Press))
  - Atopos (アトポス, Atoposu (1993 Kodansha Press))
  - The Ryugatei Murders (龍臥亭事件, Ryugatei Jiken (1996 Kobunsha Press))
  - Hollywood Certificate (ハリウッド・サーティフィケート, Hollywood Certificate (2001 Kadokawa Shoten))
  - Phantom Russian Warship (ロシア幽霊軍艦事件, Roshia Yurei Gunkan Ziken (2001 Harashobo Press))
  - The Devil's Revelry (魔神の遊戯, Majin no Yugi (2002 Bungeishunju Press))
  - St. Nicolas' Diamond Shoes (セント・ニコラスの、ダイヤモンドの靴, Sento Nikorasu no, Diamondo no Kutsu (2002 Harabshobo Press))
  - Nezishiki Zazetsuki (ネジ式ザゼツキー, Nezishiki Zazetsuki(2003 Kodansha Press))
  - Illusions from Ryugatei (龍臥亭幻想, Ryugatei Gensou (Jyo/Ge) (2004 Kobunsha Press))
  - The Phantom of the Skyscraper (摩天楼の怪人, Matenrou no Kaijin (2005 Tokyo Sougensha))
  - The Adventures of Satomi Inubo (犬坊里美の冒険, Inubo Satomi no Bouken (2006 Kobunsha Press))
  - The Final Pitch (最後の一球, Saigo no Ikkyu (2006 Harashobo Press))
  - The Sea of Star Cage (星籠の海, Seiro no Umi (2013 Kodansha Press))
  - The Rooftop (屋上, Okujō (2016 Kodansha Press))
  - The Locked Room of Torii:The Only Santa Claus in the World (鳥居の密室: 世界にただひとりのサンタクロース, Torii no Misshitsu:Seikai ni Tada Hitotri no santakuroosu (2018 Shinchosha Press))
- Novella collections
  - The Locked House of Pythagoras (Pの密室, P no Misshitsu (1999 Kodansha Press))
  - Jack the Ripper of Kamikochi (上高地の切り裂きジャック, Kamikochi no Kirisaki Jack (2003 Harashobo Press))
  - UFO Boulevard (UFO大通り, UFO Oodori (2006 Kodansha Press))
  - The Allegory of Ribeltas (リベルタスの寓話, Ribeltas no Guwa (2007 Kodansha Press))
- Short story collections
  - The Greeting of Kiyoshi Mitarai (御手洗潔の挨拶, Mitarai Kiyoshi no Aisatsu (1987 KodanshaPress))
  - The Dance of Kiyoshi Mitarai (御手洗潔のダンス, Mitarai Kiyoshi no Dansu(1990 Kodansha Press))
  - The Melodies of Kiyoshi Mitarai (御手洗潔のメロディ, Mitarai Kiyoshi No Melody (1998 Kodansha Press))
  - The Last Dinner (最後のディナー, Saigo no Dinner (1999 Harashobo Press))
  - The Drowning Mermaid (溺れる人魚, Oboreru Ningyo (2006 Harashobo Press))
  - Shinshindo Sekai Isshu (進々堂世界一周 追憶のカシュガル, Shinshindo Sekai Isshu (2011 Shinchosha Press))
  - The Recollect of Kiyoshi Mitarai (御手洗潔の追憶, Mitarai Kiyoshi No Tsuioku (2016 Shinchosha Press))

=== Detective Takeshi Yoshiki Series ===
All works, with the exception of The Fading "Crystal Express," have been published by Kobunsha Press. A portion of the works have been adapted into a TV series by TBS: Takeshi Yoshiki Series.

- Novels
  - Overnight Express "Hayabusa": the Wall of 1/60 seconds (寝台特急「はやぶさ」1/60秒の壁, Shindai Tokkyu Hayabusa 1/60byo no Kabe (1984)) – Dramatized into TV episode 1
  - The Izumo Legend: 7/8 of a Murder (出雲伝説7/8の殺人, Izumo Densetsu 7/8 no Satsuzin (1984))
  - Crane of the North: 2/3 of a Murder (北の夕鶴2/3の殺人, Kita no Yuzuru 2/3 no Satsujin (1984)) – Dramatized into TV episode 3
  - The Fading "Crystal Express" (消える「水晶特急」, Kieru Suisho Tokkyu (1984 Kadokawa Shoten))
  - A 2/2 Chance of Death (確率2/2の死, Kakuritsu 2/2 no Shi (1985))
  - The Blueprint of "Y" (Yの構図, Y no Kozu (1986))
  - Ashen Labyrinth (灰の迷宮, Hai no Meikyu (1987)) – Dramatized into TV Episode 2
  - The Night Rings a Thousand Bells (夜は千の鈴を鳴らす, Yoru wa Sen no Suzu wo Narasu (1988))
  - Yutai Ridatsu Satsujin Jiken (幽体離脱殺人事件, Yutai Ridatsu Satsujin Jiken (1989)) – Dramatized into TV Episode 4
  - Kiso, Ten o Ugokasu (奇想、天を動かす, Kisou, Ten wo Ugokasu (1989))
  - Hagoromo Densetsu no Kioku (羽衣伝説の記憶, Hagoromo Densetsu no Kioku (1990))
  - Words Without "Ra" (ら抜き言葉殺人事件, Ra Nuki Kotoba Satsujin Jiken (1991))
  - Asuka's Glass Shoes (飛鳥のガラスの靴, Asuka no Garasu no Kutsu (1991))
  - As Tears Go By (涙流れるままに, Namida Nagarerumamani (1999))
  - Illusions from Ryugatei (龍臥亭幻想, Ryugatei Gensou (Jyo/Ge) (2004))
  - Mekura Kenrō Ki Tan (盲剣楼奇譚, Mekura Kenrō Ki Tan (2019))
- Short story collection
  - The Murder in Observation Tower (展望塔の殺人, Tenbōtō no Satsujin (1987))
  - The Woman Who Sells Poison (毒を売る女, Doku o Uru Onna (1988))
  - Dancing Gibbon (踊る手なが猿, Odoru Tenaga Saru (1990))
  - The Portrait of Yoshiki Takeshi (later changed to The Shining Crane) (吉敷竹史の肖像(2002年 「光る鶴」に改題), Yoshiki Takeshi no Shozo (Hikaru Tsuru) (2002))

=== Standalone novels ===
- Let There Be Murder, Any Kind of Murder (嘘でもいいから殺人事件, Uso de mo Ii kara Satsujin Jiken (1984 Shueisha Press))
- Soseki and the London Mummy Murders (漱石と倫敦ミイラ殺人事件, Soseki to Rondon Mira Satsujin Jiken (1984 Shueisha Press))
- Jack the Ripper, One Hundred Years of Solitude (切り裂きジャック・百年の孤独, Kirisaki Jack Hyakunen no Kodoku (1988 Shueisha Press))
- Summer, 19-year-old portrait ( 夏、19歳の肖像, Natsu, jukyusai no shozo (Bungei October 1985)
