= The Return of Monjirō Kogarashi =

- Theatrical poster

Japanese name
- Kanji: 帰って来た木枯し紋次郎
Transcriptions
- Revised Hepburn: Kaettekita Kogarashi Monjirō
- Directed by: Kon Ichikawa
- Written by: Kon Ichikawa; Katsuyuki Nakamura
- Based on: Kogarashi Monjirō by Saho Sasazawa
- Produced by: Youichi Nomura
- Starring: Atsuo Nakamura; Kyōka Suzuki; Takeshi Katō; Ittoku Kishibe; Ryoko Sakaguchi
- Cinematography: Yukio Isohata
- Edited by: Chizuko Osada
- Music by: Kensaku Tanikawa
- Production companies: Toho, Fuji TV
- Distributed by: Toho
- Release date: 20 November 1993 (Japan)
- Running time: 96 minutes
- Country: Japan
- Language: Japanese

The Return of Monjirō Kogarashi (帰って来た木枯し紋次郎, Kaettekita Kogarashi Monjirō) is a 1993 Japanese film directed by Kon Ichikawa. It is based on Saho Sasazawa's novel, and is a sequel to the jidaigeki TV drama series Kogarashi Monjirō.

== Plot ==
Kogarashi Monjirō falls from a cliff during a fight, he is picked up and cared for by Denkichi, a lumberjack. For a while, Monjirō lost his memory and worked as a lumberjack. While he eventually regains his memory, Denkichi, is seriously injured and asks him to bring back his son, who has become a member of a yakuza clan. Monjirō decides to go to Jōshu to accomplish the mission.

== Cast ==
- Atsuo Nakamura as Kogarashi Monjirō
- Ryōko Sakaguchi as Omachi
- Takeshi Katō as Kiso no Denkichi
- Ittoku Kishibe as Kizaki no Gorozo
- Kyōka Suzuki as Otami
- Kazuhiko Kanayama as Koheiji
- Akiji Kobayashi as Jubei
- Isao Vitō as Toranosuke
- Takeo Nakahara as Hachibei
- Renji Ishibashi as Morisuke Asaka
- Shigeru Kōyama as Tomiokaya
