= Sakae Saitō =

Japanese writer (1933–2024)

Sakae Saitō (斉藤栄, Saitō Sakae; 14 January 1933 – 15 June 2024) was a Japanese author of popular fiction active during the Shōwa and Heisei periods of Japan.

== Early life ==
Saitō was born in Ota-ku, Tokyo. In 1944, he moved with his mother to her hometown of Fujisawa, Kanagawa. He started writing novels from junior high school. In high school, he was a classmate of Shintaro Ishihara, and assisted him in the creation of the literary circle Shonan Bungei.

After graduating from Tokyo University with a legal degree, he went to work as a bureaucrat at the Yokohama city hall, continuing to write novels on the side. With his legal background and Tokyo University credentials, he was often offered more lucrative posts within the central government, but he always refused as this would rob him of time to write.

== Writing career ==
In 1966, Saitō was awarded the 12th Edogawa Rampo Prize for his mystery novel "Murder of the Chessman" (王将に児あり, Ōshō ni koari) He followed on this with several best-selling mystery series, creating the "Tarot Himeko series", the "Inspector Edogawa Murder-Travel series", and the "Inspector Kobayakawa series", which were the basis for several popular television series.

Saitō is known for his tremendous creative speed, at times producing several hundred pages of work a week, or completing a novel within the span of a month. In particular, the Tarot Himeko series exceeded 80 novels from 1985 to 1992, and is also credited with creating a revival in the fortune-telling industry and the sales of tarot cards in Japan.

== Death ==
Saitō died on 15 June 2024, at the age of 91.
