= Tokyo Megure Keishi =

Japanese television series

- Promotional release poster
- Japanese: 東京メグレ警視シリーズ
- Genre: Drama; Mystery fiction; Crime fiction; Thriller
- Based on: Jules Maigret by Georges Simenon
- Written by: Akira Hayasaka; Issei Iki; Ren Saito; Tetsuro Abe; Ei Ogawa; Ayuko Anzai; Kimiyuki Hasegawa; Kei Hattori; Ryoji Sunada; Akira Yokomitsu; Shiro Ishimori
- Directed by: Akira Inoue; Yoshiki Onoda; Shinya Hashimoto; Yoshito Fukumoto; Meiji Fujita
- Starring: Kinya Aikawa; Tomomi Sato; Nobuo Kaneko; Kojiro Kusanagi; Junkichi Orimoto; Etsuko Ichihara; Atsuo Nakamura
- Composer: Ryudo Uzaki
- Country of origin: Japan
- Original language: Japanese
- No. of seasons: 1
- No. of episodes: 25

Production
- Producers: Kazuki Nakayama; Hisashi Yamauchi
- Running time: 54 minutes
- Production company: Asahi Broadcasting Corporation

Original release
- Network: TV Asahi
- Release: April 14 – September 29, 1978

Tokyo Megure Keishi Series (Japanese: 東京メグレ警視シリーズ, Hepburn: Tokyo megure keishi shirīzu) is a Japanese detective television drama series broadcast on TV Asahi, produced by Asahi Broadcasting (ABC TV) and Telepack. It is the fifth drama co-produced by TV Asahi. It aired from April 14, 1978, to September 29, 1978. It was broadcast in one-hour episodes from 9 PM to 10 PM on Friday nights, for a total of 25 episodes.

== Synopsis ==
The series is based on Georges Simenon's Jules Maigret. Although based on Maigret's stories, the setting of this drama takes place in Japan. Kinya Aikawa, chiefly known for his voice roles, plays Megure, a Japanese-born version of Maigret.

== Cast ==
- Kinya Aikawa as Megure
- Tomomi Sato as Mrs Megure
- Kazuya Kosaka
- Katsu Ryuzaki
- Tatsuro Nadaka
- Hanakikyo
- Nobuo Kaneko
- Kojiro Kusanagi
- Tsuneda Fujio
- Junkichi Orimoto
- Etsuko Ichihara
- Atsuo Nakamura

== Episodes ==
No.	Title	Guest stars
Episode 1	Keishi to seifu kokan (警視と政府高官)	Satoshi Yamamura, Eiji Okada, Etsushi Takahashi, Kiyoshi Maekawa
Episode 2	Keishi machigau (警視間違う)	Fubuki Jun
Episode 3	Keishi to tsuma o netora reta otoko (警視と妻を寝取られた男)	Takuzo Kawatani
Episode 4	Keishi to satsujin-sha-tachi (警視と殺人者たち)	Yasunori Irikawa
Episode 5	Keishi to garufurendo (警視とガールフレンド)	Hiromi Kurita
Episode 6	Keishi to Monmarutoru no on'na (警視とモンマルトルの女)	Mako Midori
Episode 7	Keishi to uchiakebanashi (警視と打ち明け話)	Sei Hiraizumi
Episode 8	Keishi to kuchi no katai shonin-tachi (警視と口の固い証人たち)	Bunjaku Han
Episode 9	Keishi to benchi no otoko (警視とベンチの男)	Yusuke Takita, Hiroko Kiiro, Masayuki Suzuki
Episode 10	Keishi to kubi-nashi shitai (警視と首無し死体)	Morio Kazama and Eiko Muramatsu
Episode 11	Keishi to saifu o tta otoko (警視と財布を掏った男)	Orie Sato
Episode 12	Keishi to kayo no asa no homon-sha (警視と火曜の朝の訪問者)	Hiroshi Yagyu, Sakura Kamo
Episode 13	Keishi fujin no inai yoru (警視夫人のいない夜)	Narumi Kayashima, Hajime Kimura
Episode 14	Keishi to korosa reta yogi-sha (警視と殺された容疑者)	Choichiro Kawarasaki, Mojiro Sato, and Yoshio Oran
Episode 15	Keishi to minamijūjisei (警視と南十字星)	Mayumi Ogawa
Episode 16	Keishi to hitori botchi no otoko (警視とひとりぼっちの男)	Yoshika Yonekura, Kaori Shima
Episode 17	Keishi to koen no on'na (警視と公園の女)	Miyoko Akaza, Shogen Nitta
Episode 18	Keishi to kieta shitai (警視と消えた死体)	Murasaki Fujima, Shogo Shimizu
Episode 19	Keishi to yurei (警視と幽霊)	Hideko Takehara
Episode 20	Keishi to rokuon mania (警視と録音マニア)	Akira Yamauchi, Kayoko Tomoka
Episode 21	Keishi to manatsunoyorunoyume (警視と真夏の夜の夢)	Tsuguaki Yoshida, Ayako Hosho
Episode 22	Keishi to rofufu no nazo (警視と老夫婦の謎)	Chieko Murata, Romi Yamada
Episode 23	Keishi to zenryona hitobito (警視と善良な人々)	Akira Nakao, Shuko Motoami, Ai Suwa
Episode 24	Keishi to satsujin yokoku (警視と殺人予告)	Higashi Terumi
Episode 25	Keishi to saigo no jiken (警視と最後の事件)	Hiroyuki Nagato and Kotonei Hatsui

== Production ==
Tomomi Sato sang the series' theme song Toki no Nagareru Mama ni. She even sings it while playing the piano in an episode's scene.

The name Megure is the Japanese pronunciation for Maigret.

== Reception ==
The series was praised by Georges Simenon himself, who especially praised Tomomi Sato's portrayal of "Madame Maigret", stating that she was the best "Madame Maigret" he had ever seen, even including those from French adaptations.

== Legacy ==
Inspector Juzo Megure from the manga Case Closed is named like the main character of this series.
