= Motohiko Izawa =

Japanese writer (born 1954)

- Born: February 1, 1954 (age 72); Nagoya, Japan
- Occupations: Writer, researcher of history
- Writing career
- Period: 1980–present
- Genres: detective fiction, historical novels
- Notable works: Sarumaru Genshi-ko; Gyakusetsu no Nihonshi
- Notable awards: Edogawa Rampo Prize (1980)

Motohiko Izawa (井沢 元彦, Izawa Motohiko; born February 1, 1954, Nagoya, Aichi Prefecture) is a Japanese writer of mystery novels and historical fiction as well as a historical researcher. He was formerly a news reporter for TBS and since April 2012 has worked as a visiting professor at Shuchiin University.

== Career and writings ==
Motohiko Izawa graduated from Chitose Tokyo Metropolitan High School, now Roka Tokyo Metropolitan High School, and from the faculty of law at Waseda University. While he was in university his story Tōsaku no Hōfuku ("Retaliation for Perversion") was a candidate for the Edogawa Rampo Prize. After graduation he joined TBS as a news reporter. In 1980, at the time he was working at the politics section of the news bureau, his novel Sarumaru Genshi-ko ("Illusionary Travel Around Sarumaru") won the 26th Edogawa Rampo Prize. Sarumaru Genshi-ko is a both detective fiction and a historical novel in which the protagonist mentally travels in time under the influence of medications and, in a science-fiction style twist, amalgamates with the mind of Shinobu Orikuchi and solves crimes in Orikuchi's time as well as unravelling the mystery of the Heian-era iroha and the relationship of the poets Sarumaru no Taifu and Kakinomoto no Hitomaro. In 1985 Izawa left TBS to become a full-time writer.

Most of Izawa's novels are on the plane of what he calls historical mysteries, in which he ties modern-day murders into his detective fiction while taking the mysteries of history as his themes. In addition, he also works on pure historical fiction, and he develops his own unique theories on history, particularly since 1992 in the successive instalments of his popular series of non-fiction history books, Gyakusetsu no Nihonshi ("Paradoxical Japanese History").

In his early days he also wrote fantasy and the novelization of the Nintendo game Dragon Buster. Recently he has turned his attention outside of Japanese history and has released books such as a series of "intensive courses" on the religions of Buddhism, Shintoism, Confucianism, Judaism, Christianity, and Islam.

== Views on Japanese history ==
Izawa has a strong command of diverse historical materials and treats the society and history of Japan from an original point of view. He sees as the animating undercurrents of Japan the unconscious faith of the Japanese people in kotodama, onryo, kegare, and wa, or harmony.

Izawa thinks highly of and has been heavily influenced by Shunshin Chin and Takeshi Umehara. He reveres Umehara, a pioneer of the view that Japanese history has been shaped by the fear of onryo, as being 'someone who is like a beloved teacher to me". The theories about Kakinomoto no Hitomaro's life espoused in his book Sarumaru Genshi-ko are taken from Umehara's Minasoko no Uta.

His style of writing history takes into account his thorough dissection and criticism of "the three great flaws of the study of history", which include the "authoritarianism" of professional historical societies, an excessively empirical reliance on historical documents as opposed to the unsaid or unconscious factors of history, and the ignoring or belittling of mystical and religious aspects.

He is vocal about problems with the way Japanese people perceive their history centering on the Second Sino-Japanese War and World War II and frequently contributes articles on the subject to journals of opinion such as the biweekly magazine SAPIO. He is critical of the stance of the mass media towards history including the Asahi Shimbun which he blasted in a book co-written with Yoshinori Kobayashi. Izawa is affiliated with the Japanese Society for History Textbook Reform and is an active denier of the Nanjing massacre. As a member of this society, his books were among those owned by Nishi Library in Funabashi which were destroyed in 2001 by the librarians. In 2005 the Supreme Court ordered the library to pay compensation for the loss.

=== Criticism ===
After the Chuo Gishi Kai, a group dedicated to studying the 47 ronin, wrote a detailed and scathing criticism of one volume in his Gyakusetsu no Nihonshi subtitled "The Mystery of Chushingura", it became clear that Izawa was not at all able to read old Japanese documents. The late historian Eiichi Matsushima who was a professor at Waseda University criticized him on this matter and at one point Izawa changed his views, though he retracted his change of heart after Matsushima's death.

In a 12 December 2007 column for the magazine SAPIO he attacked Kenzaburō Ōe's 1970 essay Okinawa Note but when quoting similar criticism by Ayako Sono from a 28 November column in the same magazine he conspicuously fixated on Sono's infamous misreading by swapping her use of kyokai (巨魁 meaning ringleader) with the correct kyokai (巨塊 meaning colossal mass).

== TV appearances ==
He has made appearances on many television programs including "Takajin no Sokomade Itte Iinkai" and "Wake up!" on Yomiuri TV and "Koko ga Hen da yo Nihonjin" on TBS, and is the Monday commentator on "Yoshida Terumi Soko daiji na Koto" on NCB. He has also served as a regular commentator on the TV show "Historical Discoveries" on NHK.

In recent years his TV appearances in Tokyo have been scarce but he continues to appear in Kansai, including several times on "Be-bop High Heel" on Asahi TV. He even appeared on "Hikari Ota's If I Were Prime Minister... Secretary Tanaka" in which he analyzed the Japanese people's religious outlook and belief in kotodama and a lively debate ensued based on his cherished theories.

== Other views and activities ==
He advocates democratic fundamentals in both Japanese society and politics. In January 2012 he went to work at the headquarters of the Chūkyō Dokuritsu Senryaku Honbu which seeks to abolish Aichi Prefecture and elevate Nagoya to metropolis-level status as Tokyo already is. He expressed his sympathy to Koichi Kato when his home was burned down and on the occasion argued for a reappraisal of his political record.

In 2010 Izawa also worked on a committee to commemorate the 1300th anniversary of the moving of the Japanese capital to Heijo-kyo.

He loves baseball and partly because of his Nagoya origins, he is also a fan of the Chunichi Dragons.

== See also ==
- Historical revisionism
