= The Tokyo Zodiac Murders =

1981 novel by Soji Shimada

- The cover of the first English edition
- Author: Soji Shimada
- Original title: 占星術殺人事件 (Senseijutsu Satsujinjiken)
- Translator: Ross and Shika Mackenzie
- Illustrator: Unlisted
- Cover artist: Takumitz Ohga
- Language: Japanese
- Series: Detective Mitarai's Casebook
- Genre: Murder mystery
- Publisher: IBC Publishing
- Publication date: 1981
- Publication place: Japan
- English publication date: 2004
- Media type: Print (hardcover)
- Pages: 251 (2004 edition)
- ISBN: 4-925080-81-4
- OCLC: 55795584

The Tokyo Zodiac Murders (占星術殺人事件, Senseijutsu Satsujinjiken) is the debut mystery novel of Soji Shimada, a Japanese musician and writer on astrology who is best known as the author of over 100 mystery novels. Besides being Shimada's first novel and a best seller, it was nominated for the prestigious Edogawa Rampo Prize for mystery novels.

== Plot ==
The novel is divided into several sections. A foreword from the author challenges the reader to solve the gruesome mysteries; it claims that every clue necessary will be included in the text, and that the characters will have no unfair advantage over the reader.

The first section is a fictional short story and will which lays out the setting: it is 1936 in the Shōwa period of pre-World War II Japan.

A painter and womanizer named Heikichi Umezawa has long been obsessed with astrology and alchemy; he is a wealthy but fairly old man from a respectable family, who still lives in a traditionally run sprawling household. He is finishing his greatest work: 12 large paintings, each depicting a member of the zodiac. As he works in his private studio on the last one, a portrait of Aries, his head is smashed with a blunt object. The murder is curious: it took place on a heavily snowing day, and many of the suspects have solid alibis. Further, when discovered, the room is locked and apparently had been locked from inside - leading to a locked room mystery.

When the studio is investigated, a bizarre note is discovered - the same short story which starts the novel. In it, the narrator, who identifies himself as Heikichi, describes a long-running battle with mental disease, diabolism, and his murderous urge to create the perfect woman called "Azoth.” To do this, he will cut up his 2 daughters, 2 of his 3 stepdaughters and his 2 nieces, and take a single astrologically aligned piece of her body and combine it with the others. The reason given for excluding his remaining stepdaughter, Kazue Kanemoto, is that she is not a virgin. Each one will be killed with an alchemically significant metal and buried in a place which produces those metals. He writes that he will carry out his plan as soon as he finishes the Aries portrait.

Shortly after the murder of Heikichi, Kazue Kanemoto is discovered with her head smashed as well. The murder is deemed an unrelated case of aggravated robbery.

After that murder, Heikichi's remaining daughter, stepdaughters and nieces, along with Heikichi's widow, travel to Mt. Yahiko to lay Heikichi's spirit to rest. They split up there, and the 6 young women disappear. Their bodies are discovered over the next few months, buried near mines all over Japan, and missing a body part as listed in Heikichi’s note. The murders become a national sensation, but each one remains unsolved for the next 40 years.

The novel is brought up to the present, where a freelance illustrator and avid fan of mysteries, Kazumi Ishioka, is teaching his friend, the astrologer Kiyoshi Mitarai, about the Zodiac Murders; Mitarai had been approached by a client who claimed to have new evidence about the murders. This evidence is revealed to be a secret confession by a policeman involved in the investigation of the murder of Kazue. Just before she was murdered, he had in fact gone with her to her house and had sex with her. Afterwards, an anonymous letter arrived, which claimed to be from one of the many secret agencies in pre-war Japan like the Nakano School. The sender threatens to reveal his tryst with Kazue, which would make him the prime suspect if ever discovered. In exchange for their silence, he would carry out a task for them: take the dead mutilated bodies of six young women to different places in Japan and bury them as specified.

In Act 2, Ishioka and Mitarai travel to Kyoto to interview surviving people related to the case.

Act 3 sees a more comprehensive investigation of the environs of Kyoto and the people. In the last page, Mitarai is musing about an old scam in which one used tape to counterfeit new paper bills from existing ones. Abruptly, he is struck by insight and he solves all three cases.

The author follows with a note to the reader, warning that in the subsequent pages the solution will be revealed, and that the reader has all the needed information, and a valuable hint.

=== Solution ===
In Act 4, Mitarai remains coy as to the solution, but takes Ishioka to a polite meeting with the culprit: an old woman who would have been 23 at the time of the murders. Ishioka concludes that that means the culprit behind the murders was in fact one of the daughters, but is unable to deduce which one.

The final act sees Mitarai revealing the solution to a number of people. He explains Heikichi’s murder, Kazue's murder, and the Azoth murders: it is possible, if one cuts apart paper money and then tapes the pieces back together appropriately, to create one more bill than one originally had. In the same way, the culprit, Heikichi's daughter from his first marriage, Tokiko (now living under the name of Taeko Sudo), had cut apart the bodies of the other five young women and arranged them in such a way that it seemed as if there were 6 bodies, when in fact there were only 5 - the missing pieces which everyone had assumed would go to building Azoth were in fact all hers. The note too was a forgery intended to mislead and focus attention on Azoth. Taeko was motivated to her elaborate revenge by the extremely poor treatment she received at the hands of her stepmother, stepsisters, and cousins and particularly by the treatment her mother (Heikichi's first wife, Tae) had received: divorced by Heikichi and impoverished, she had to waste her life selling cigarettes on the street. After Mitarai explains everything, the police take credit and news soon arrives that Taeko has committed suicide, after sending a letter to Mitarai detailing her exact role in the story.

== See also ==
- Tozai Mystery Best 100 (The Top 100 Mystery Novels of the East and the West)
