= Masako Togawa =

Japanese artist and activist (1931–2016)

- 戸川昌子 (Togawa Masako)
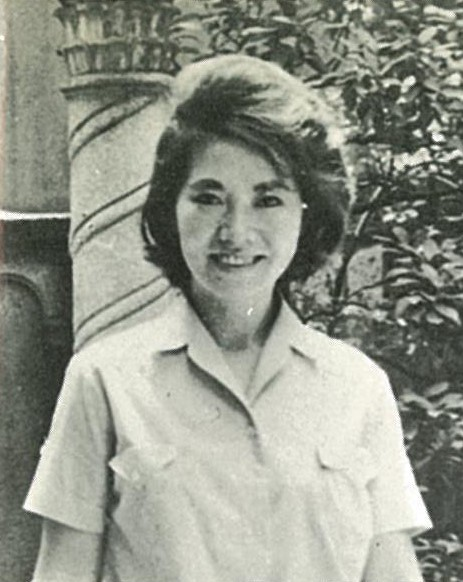
- Born: 23 March 1931
- Died: 26 April 2016 (aged 85)
- Writing career
- Notable work: The Grand Illusion (1962)

Masako Togawa (戸川昌子, Togawa Masako) (23 March 1931 – 26 April 2016) was a Japanese Chanson singer/songwriter, actress, feminist, novelist, lesbian icon, former night club owner, metropolitan city planning panelist, and music educator.

== Personal life ==
Masako Togawa grew up in "restricted circumstances" following the death of her father. She worked as a typist for five years after leaving high school, then, aged 23, she made her singing debut, at the well-known nightclub Gin-Pari. Togawa had several children, the last of whom was born when she was 48 years old. Not much about her children has been made public.

Togawa often made public appearances with a multicoloured "Afro" hairstyle.

She taught numerous musicians how to sing and compose.

== Chanson/club career ==
In 1967 Togawa turned her sister’s coffee shop into a nightclub, the Aoi Heya ("Blue Room"), which became a celebrity hangout, a lesbian night club, a chansonnier and, in recent years, a live music club.

In 1975 she brought out her first record, "Lost Love", which was followed by "The Moral of the Story".

In December 2011 Masako Togawa had to close the Aoi Heya after 43 years because of pressing financial difficulties, despite the endeavours of a Blue Room Relief Fund. In May 2012 she expressed a desire for the club to be relaunched, and there is now a "Monday Blue Room" hosted by the Tokyo Salavas.

In February 2012, Togawa began a "Blue Room Grand Cabaret" delivered through a web TV channel, Scatch.TV, and Chanson classes on the first and third Wednesdays of every month. It appears that her only concern was that the venue might be "overflowing".

== Film and TV career ==
Masako Togawa had the lead role in the TV show Playgirl, which ran from 1969 to 1974. The plot centred on a character clearly based on Togawa herself, a mystery writer named Masako who creates an all-female company of detectives to uncover white-collar crimes. She also acted in the film The Hunter’s Diary (1974), adapted from stories that she co-wrote, and in the television show Ōi Naru Genei, based on her first novel (known in English as The Master Key).

== Writing career and critical reception ==
Masako Towaga began writing in 1961, backstage, between her stage appearances, and her first novel, The Master Key, was published in 1962. It won her the Edogawa Rampo Prize. The novel is set in the apartment she grew up in with her mother. Her second novel, The Lady Killer, followed in 1963, becoming a bestseller. It was adapted for both TV and film, and was nominated for the Naoki Prize.'

She wrote more than 30 novels and was one of the most popular mystery writers in Japan. Many of her novels were based on her experiences.

A reviewer in the Times Literary Supplement called her "the P. D. James of Japan", but an anonymous reviewer of Slow Fuse in Kirkus Reviews found the work "sluggishly paced and indifferently written .... [an] hysterically overplotted soaper."

== Literary works ==
=== Novels ===
- The Grand Illusion (大いなる幻影, Ōi Naru Genei). Kodansha. 1962.
  - translated into English by Simon Grove in 1984 as The Master Key.
  - winner of the 8th Edogawa Rampo Prize.
- Diary of a Hunter (猟人日記, Karyūdo Nikki). Kodansha.1963.
  - translated into English by Simon Grove in 1985 as The Lady Killer.
  - nominated for the 50th Naoki Prize.
- Unpromised (契らずに, Chigirazu ni) Shueisha. 1965.
- Pale Skin (蒼ざめた肌, Aozameru Hada) Bungeishunju Magazine. 1965.
- The Woman's White Road (女人白道, Nyonin Hakudō) Sankei Shimbun. 1965.
- Sodom's Snare (ソドムの罠, Sodomu no Wana). Kodansha. 1965.
- Akasaka Wildlife Sanctuary (赤坂禁猟区, Akasaka Kinryōku). Kodansha. 1966.
- Poaching in Broad Daylight (白昼の密漁, Hakuchū no Mitsuryō). Kodansha. 1966.
- Costume Parade (仮装行列, Kasōgyōretsu) Kodansha. 1967.
- Deep Slump (深い失速, Fukai Shissoku) Kodansha. 1967.
  - translated into English by Simon Grove in 1995 as Slow Fuse.
- Rock Bottom Ginza (銀座「どん底」附近, Ginza "Donzoku" Fukin). Bungei Shunju. 1967.
- The Book of Sleepless Nights: The Woman's Lustrous Brush (眠れない夜の本: おんなの艶筆, Nemurenai Yoru no Hon: Onna no Tsuya Fude). Seishun. 1967.
- Belt of Mirages (蜃気楼の帯, Shinkirō no Obi). Yomiuri Shimbun. 1967.
- Louder! (もっと声を!, Motto Koe wo). Shinchōsha. 1968.
- Night Passport (夜のパスポート, Yoru no Pasupōto). Kodansha. 1968.
- Red Corona (赤い暈, Akai Kasa). Shinchōsha. 1969.
- Nightmare (夢魔, Muma). Kodansha. 1969.
- Nature of Masks (仮面の性, Kamen no Sei). Tokyo Books. 1969.
- Blue Snake (蒼い蛇, Aoi Hebi). Tokuma Shoten. 1969.（1969年、徳間書店）
- Red Scratchmarks (赤い爪痕, Akai Tsumeato). Tokuma Shoten. 1970.
- Scene of Nude with Sacred Story (聖談とヌードの風景, Seidan to Nūdo no Fūkei). Best Sellers. 1970.
- Hour of the Hunt (狩りの時刻, Kari no Jikoku). Kodansha. 1970.
  - later adapted as a manga by Yumiko Igarashi under the title La Nuit Magic: 夜は魔術 (Yoru wa Majutsu) in 1990.
- Phantom's Fang (幻影の牙, Genei no Kiba). The Sankei Shimbun. 1970.
- Transparent Woman (透明女, Tōmei Onna). Kōbunsha. 1971.
- Forced Marriage (強制結婚, Kyōsei Kekkon). Tokuma Shoten. 1972.
- The Female Trap (牝の罠, Mesu no Wana). Tokuma Shoten. 1972.
- Requiem of Lust (欲望の鎮魂歌, Yokubō no Chinkonka). Jitsugyō no Nihon Sha. 1973.
- Only One Lives: When You Try to Burn Your Life Into That Person (生きるのはひとり: その人に生命を燃やそうとするとき, Ikiru no wa Hitori: Sono Hito ni Seimei wo Moyasou to suru toki). Seishun. 1974.
- Beautiful Prey (美しき獲物たち, Utsukushiki Emonotachi). Bungei Shunjū. 1974.
- A Kiss of Fire (火の接吻). Kodansha. 1984.
  - translated into English by Simon Grove in 1988 as A Kiss of Fire.

=== Novellas & Short Stories ===
- Out of the Darkness (闇の中から, Yami no Naka Kara). first published in Hōseki. 1963.
  - later republished as part of Mystery Writers of Japan's Best 24 Mysteries of 1964.
- The Abortion of Scarlet (緋の堕胎, Hi no Datai). First published in Ōru Yomimono. 1964.
  - later republished in the Mystery Writers of Japan's Best 24 Mysteries of 1965.
- The Shaking Woman (揺れる女, Yureru Onna). Kodansha. 1967.
- Intersection of Night (夜の交差点, Yoru no Kōsaten). Tokyo Books. 1967.
- Honey Flavored (蜜の味, Mitsu no Aji). Tokyo Books. 1968.
- Severed Sleep. (裂けた眠り, Saketa Nemuri). Shinchōsha. 1968.
- Pulse of Flame (火の脈, Hi no Myaku). Tokyo Books. 1969.
- Scratches of Night (夜の爪痕, Yoru no Tsumeato). Tokyo Books. 1969.
- Wall of Love (壁の恋, Kabe no Koi). Tokyo Books. 1969.
- Inside the Blue Room (青い部屋の中で, Aoi Heya no Naka de). Bungei Shunjū. 1969.
- Strange Partners (見知らぬ伴侶, Mishiranu Hanyo). Tokyo Books.1969.
- Devilish Woman (悪魔のような女, Akuma noyōna Onna). Kodansha. 1969.
- A Swarm of Blue Nudes (蒼き裸者の群れ, Aoki Hadakasha no Mure). Tokuma Shoten. 1970.
- The Yellow Vampire (黄色い吸血鬼, Kīroi Kyūketsuki). Tuttle. 1970.
  - published in English in the anthology Ellery Queen's Japanese Golden Dozen: The Detective Story World in Japan A collection of Togawa's short stories in Japanese was also published in 1978 under the same (Japanese) title.
- Holy Woman (聖女, Seijo). Kodansha. 1971.
- Tale of the Japanese Temptress (日本毒婦伝, Nihon Dokufu Den). Kodansha. 1971.
  - later republished under the title Reality of the Wicked Woman (悪女の真実, Akujo no Shinjitsu).
- Tale of the East-West Enchantress (東西妖婦伝, Tōzai Yōfu Den). Shueisha. 1972.
- Coffin of Water (水の寝棺, Mizu no Nekan). Kodansha. 1972.
- Underdog (負け犬, Makeinu). Tokyo Books. 1974.
- Rebirth of Flesh (肉の復活, Niku no Fukkatsu). Marine Books. 1974.
- Like Freezing Flames (冷えた炎の如く, Hieta Hinō Gotoku). Pep. 1975.
- Victim of the Sun (太陽の生贄, Taiyō no Ikenie). Futabasha. 1978.
  - later republished under the title Soul Colored (霊色, Rei Iro).
- Black Honeymoon (ブラック・ハネムーン, Burakku Hanemūn). Futabasha. 1980.
- The Mummy of Tsumagoi (嬬恋木乃伊, Tsumagoi Mīra). Tokuma Shoten. 1987.
