= Atsuo Nakamura =

Japanese actor and politician

- 中村 敦雄

Member of the House of Councillors
- In office 26 July 1998 – 25 July 2004
- Preceded by: Kensaku Morita
- Succeeded by: Masaharu Nakagawa
- Constituency: Tokyo at-large

Personal details
- Born: 18 February 1940 (age 86) Toshima, Tokyo, Japan
- Party: Independent
- Other political affiliations: NPS (1995–2004)
- Education: Tokyo University of Foreign Studies
- Occupation: Actor, politician
- Years active: 1964–present

Atsuo Nakamura (中村 敦夫, Nakamura Atsuo; born 18 February 1940) is a Japanese actor and politician. He has appeared in more than 50 films since 1964. His younger brother Katsuyuki Nakamura is a writer.

== Career ==
Nakamura first joined the Haiyuza theatre troupe in 1962, and became famous for his starring role in the television jidaigeki series Kogarashi Monjirō, which began broadcasting in 1972. He later hosted several television news programs before becoming elected to the House of Councillors in 1998. He lost his seat in the 2004 election.

== Selected filmography ==
=== Films ===
Year	Title	Role	Notes	Ref
1968	Kill!			
1970	The Vampire Doll			
1970	The Scandalous Adventures of Buraikan			
1971	The Ceremony			
1978	Ogin-sama	Yamanoue Sōji		
1978	Kaerazaru hibi			
1983	The Highest Honor			
1993	Kaetekita Kogarashi Monjirō	Kogarashi Monjirō	Lead role	
1994	47 Ronin	Hara Soemon		
2006	The Inugami			
2011	Runway Beat			

=== TV ===
Year	Title	Role	Notes	Ref
1971	Haru no Sakamichi	Ishida Mitsunari	Taiga drama	
1972	Kogarashi Monjirō	Kogarashi Monjirō	Lead role	
1973	The Water Margin	Lin Chung	Lead role	
1976	Hissatsu Shiwazanin	Akai Kennosuke	Hissatsu series	
1978	Tokyo Megure Keishi			
1978-79	Tobe Hissatsu Uragoroshi	Sensei	Lead role; Hissatsu series	
1979	Fumō Chitai	Tatsuzo Samejima		
2012	Priceless	Iwao Ōyashiki		
2012	Taira no Kiyomori	Taira no Masamori	Taiga drama	
2015	Mare	Yatarō Kontani	Asadora	
2020	The Return			
