= Kinya Aikawa =

Japanese actor (1934–2015)

- 愛川 欽也
- Born: Toshiaki Ikawa (井川 敏明); June 25, 1934; Sugamo, Tokyo, Japan
- Died: April 15, 2015 (aged 80); Tokyo, Japan
- Occupations: Actor, tarento, voice actor
- Spouse: Midori Utsumi (m. 1978)

Kinya Aikawa (愛川 欽也, Aikawa Kin'ya; June 25, 1934 – April 15, 2015), born Toshiaki Ikawa (井川 敏明, Ikawa Toshiaki), was a Japanese actor, tarento and voice actor. He was born in Tokyo and died in 2015 of lung cancer.

== Filmography ==
=== Acting roles ===
==== Films ====
- Torakku Yarō series (1975-1979)
- The Battle of Port Arthur (1980)
- Edo Porn (1981)

==== Television ====
- Naruhodo! The World (host, 1981–1996)

=== Voice roles ===
==== Television ====
- Space Ace (1965), Yadokari
- Son-goku is Coming: Chapter of Ko-fu Dai-o (1966 special), Sagojo
- Jump Out! Batchiri (1966), Officer Chibisu, Roba
- Gokū no Daibōken (1967), Sagojo
- Speed Racer (1967), Ken'ichi Mifune / Racer X
- The Monster Kid (1968)
- Hakushon Daimaou (1969), Grandfather "And then"
- Inakappe Taishō (1970), Nyanko-sensei
- Vampiyan Kids (2001), Papa

==== Films ====
- Dragon Ball: The Path to Power (1996), Kame Sennin

==== Dubbing ====
- Jack Lemmon
  - The Apartment (C.C. Baxter)
  - The Front Page (Hildy Johnson)
  - Good Neighbor Sam (Sam Bissell)
  - The Great Race (Professor Fate / Prince Hapnick)
  - How to Murder Your Wife (Stanley Ford)
  - Irma la Douce (Nestor Patou / Lord X)
  - Mister Roberts (Ens. Frank Thurlowe Pulver)
  - Some Like It Hot (Jerry - 'Daphne')
  - Under the Yum Yum Tree (Hogan)
  - The Wackiest Ship in the Army (Lt. Rip Crandall)
- Dr. Strangelove (1971 TV Asahi edition) (Group Captain Lionel Mandrake (Peter Sellers))
- Singin' in the Rain (Donald Lockwood (Gene Kelly))
- Strangers on a Train (Guy Haines (Farley Granger))

== Classic roles ==
- Tōkyō Megure Keishi, a 25-episode TV Series aired from April 14 to May 29, 1978, on TV Asahi. Although the series is based on a French series of Maigret mystery books by Georges Simenon and Aikawa is now primarily known as a voice actor, it is not a dubbed version of the French TV Series based on the books. Aikawa stars in person as Megure, a Japanese-born equivalent to the French Maigret, reinvented in a Japanese setting.
