= Kazufumi Shiraishi =

Kazufumi Shiraishi (白石一文)
- Born: 1958 (age 67–68); Japan
- Occupation: Writer
- Writing career
- Genre: Novel
- Notable works: Hokanaranu hito e (To an Incomparable Other) Kono mune ni fukabuka to tsukisasaru ya o nuke (Remove that Arrow from Deep in My Heart)
- Notable awards: Naoki Prize (2009)

Kazufumi Shiraishi (白石 一文, Shiraishi Kazufumi) is a Japanese novelist and the son of novelist Ichirō Shiraishi. The two are the only father-son pair to have both received the Naoki Prize, the father on his eighth nomination after numerous disappointments and the son on his second, for the 2009 Hokanaranu hito e (To an Incomparable Other). At his prize press conference, the son joked that he had always “hated” the Naoki because of the grief it had put his father through.

Shiraishi debuted in 2000 to great critical acclaim with Isshun no hikari (A Ray of Light). His novel Boku no naka no kowareteinai bubun (The Part of Me That Isn’t Broken Inside), published in 2002, became a national best-seller and is forthcoming in translation from Dalkey Archive Press, who is also publishing Shiraishi's 2008 novel, Kono yo no zenbu o tekini mawashite (Me Against the World). In addition to winning the Naoki Prize, Shiraishi has also won the prestigious Yamamoto Shūgorō Prize for his 2009 novel, Kono mune ni fukabuka to tsukisasaru ya o nuke (Remove That Arrow from Deep in My Heart). He is a member of Red Circle Authors.

== Life ==
Kazufumi Shiraishi’s first job out of college was as an editor and magazine reporter at Bungeishunju. He published his first work in 2000, and three years later quit his company to become a full-time writer. Shiraishi currently lives in Tokyo with his wife.

== Works ==
- Isshun no hikari (A Ray of Light), 2000
- Boku no naka no kowareteinai bubun (The Part of Me That Isn't Broken Inside), 2002. Translation: Dalkey Archive Press, 2017
- Kono yo no zenbu o tekini mawashite (Me Against the World), 2008. Translation: Dalkey Archive Press, 2016
- Kono mune ni fukabuka to tsukisasaru ya o nuke (Remove That Arrow from Deep in My Heart), 2009
- Hokanaranu hito e (To An Incomparable Other), 2009
- Hikari no nai umi (The Lightless Sea), 2015
