= Legacy for the Future =

Japanese television documentary series

Legacy for the Future (未来への遺産, Mirai eno Isan) was Japan's first television documentary miniseries.

Run on NHK for seventeen installments in 1974 and 1975, the theme of the program was "why civilizations flourished and declined." Footage was seen from over 150 World Heritage Sites in 44 countries. An experimental series of programs, Legacy for the Future paved the way for the modern Japanese television documentary that NHK has since become known for.
