= Edogawa Rampo Prize =

Japanese mystery writing award

The Edogawa Rampo Prize (江戸川乱歩賞, Edogawa Ranpo Shō), named after Edogawa Rampo, is a Japanese literary award which has been presented every year by the Mystery Writers of Japan since 1955.

Though its name is similar to the Edgar Allan Poe Awards, which has been presented by Mystery Writers of America, the Edogawa Rampo Prize is not a counterpart of the Edgar Awards. The Japanese counterparts of the Edgar awards are the Mystery Writers of Japan Awards, which honor the best in crime fiction and critical/biographical work published in the previous year.

The Edogawa Rampo Prize is an award for unpublished mystery novels. It is sponsored by Kodansha and Fuji Television. Not only is the novel of the winner, which is selected from more than 300 entries, published by Kodansha, but the winner also receives a prize of 5,000,000 yen.

The members of the 2014 selection committee were Natsuo Kirino, Natsuhiko Kyogoku, Ira Ishida, Alice Arisugawa (ja) and Bin Konno (ja), who is the current president of the Mystery Writers of Japan.

On the Prize's 70th year in 2024, the awardees are: Yukakujima Shinju Gatari by Ryu Shimotsuki and Fake Muscle by Eitaro Hino. They were recognized as best among a total of 395 submissions, and they will each receive a statue of Edogawa Rampo plus 2,500,000 yen as prizes. Further, Kodansha will publish the winning works in August 2024.

== Winners ==
The first and second Edogawa Rampo Prize is not the crime novel award, but an award given to persons who have made an outstanding contribution to the genre.

	Year	Winner	Winning entry	Available in English Translation
1	1955	Kawataro Nakajima	Biographical and bibliographical dictionary of detective fiction	
2	1956	Hayakawa Publishing Corporation (ja)	Publication of Hayakawa Pocket Mystery Books (ja)	
3	1957	Etsuko Niki	Neko wa Shitteita (猫は知っていた)	
4	1958	Kyo Takigawa (ja)	Nureta Kokoro (濡れた心)	
5	1959	Fumiko Shinsho (ja)	Kikenna Kankei (危険な関係)	
6	1960		No Award Presented	
7	1961	CHIN Shunshin	Karekusa no Ne (枯草の根)	
8	1962	Sen Saga (ja)	Hanayakana Shitai (華やかな死体)	
8	1962	Masako Togawa	Ōinaru Gen'ei (大いなる幻影)	The Master Key
9	1963	Shota Fujimura (ja)	Kodokuna Asufaruto (孤独なアスファルト)	
10	1964	Noboru Saito (ja)	Ari no Ki no Shita de (蟻の木の下で)	
11	1965	Kyotaro Nishimura	Tenshi no Shōkon (天使の傷痕)	
12	1966	Sakae Saito	Satsujin no Kifu (殺人の棋譜)	
13	1967	Eisuke Kaito (ja)	Berurin 1888nen (伯林 一八八八年)	
14	1968		No Award Presented	
15	1969	Seiichi Morimura	Kōsō no Shikaku (高層の死角)	
16	1970	Yotaro Otani (ja)	Satsui no Ensō (殺意の演奏)	
17	1971		No Award Presented	
18	1972	Shunzo Waku (ja)	Kamen Hōtei (仮面法廷)	
19	1973	Hajime Komine (ja)	Arukimedesu wa Te o Yogosanai (アルキメデスは手を汚さない)	
20	1974	Kyuzo Kobayashi (ja)	Ankoku Kokuchi (暗黒告知)	
21	1975	Keisuke Kusaka (ja)	Chō-tachi wa Ima (蝶たちは今…)	
22	1976	Ro Tomono (ja)	Gojūmannen no Shikaku (五十万年の死角)	
23	1977	Sen Fujimoto	Toki o Kizamu Shio (時をきざむ潮)	
23	1977	Tatsuo Kaji (ja)	Tōmeina Kisetsu (透明な季節)	
24	1978	Kaoru Kurimoto	Bokura no Jidai (ぼくらの時代)	
25	1979	Yoshio Takayanagi (ja)	Puraha kara no Dōke-tachi (プラハからの道化たち)	
26	1980	Motohiko Izawa	Sarumaru Genshikō (猿丸幻視行)	
27	1981	Akira Nagai (ja)	Genshiro no Kani (原子炉の蟹)	
28	1982	Fumihiko Nakatsu (ja)	Ōgon Ryūsa (黄金流砂)	
28	1982	Futari Okajima (ja)	Kogecha-iro no Pasuteru (焦茶色のパステル)	
29	1983	Katsuhiko Takahashi	Sharaku Satsujin Jiken (写楽殺人事件)	The Case of the Sharaku Murders
30	1984	Kanako Torii (ja)	Tennyo no Matsuei (天女の末裔)	
31	1985	Keigo Higashino	Hōkago (放課後)	
31	1985	Masahiro Mori (ja)	Mōtsaruto wa Komoriuta o Utawanai (モーツァルトは子守唄を歌わない)	
32	1986	Yoko Yamazaki (ja)	Hanazono no Meikyū (花園の迷宮)	
33	1987	Toshihiro Ishii (ja)	Kaze no Tānrōdo (風のターンロード)	
34	1988	Koichi Sakamoto (ja)	Hakushoku no Zanzō (白色の残像)	
35	1989	Shukei Nagasaka (ja)	Asakusa Enoken Ichiza no Arashi (浅草エノケン一座の嵐)	
36	1990	Yoichi Abe (ja)	Fenikkusu no Chōshō (フェニックスの弔鐘)	
36	1990	Ryo Toba (ja)	Ken-no-michi Satsujin Jiken (剣の道殺人事件)	
37	1991	Sho Narumi (ja)	Naito Dansā (ナイトダンサー)	
37	1991	Yuichi Shimpo (ja)	Rensa (連鎖)	
38	1992	Yaichiro Kawada (ja)	Shiroku Nagai Rōka (白く長い廊下)	
39	1993	Natsuo Kirino	Kao ni Furikakaru Ame (顔に降りかかる雨)	
40	1994	Hiroyuki Nakajima (ja)	Kensatsu Sōsa (検察捜査)	
41	1995	Iori Fujiwara (ja)	Terorisuto no Parasoru (テロリストのパラソル)	
42	1996	Yoko Watanabe (ja)	Hidarite ni Tsugeru Nakare (左手に告げるなかれ)	
43	1997	Hisashi Nozawa	Hasen no Marisu (破線のマリス)	
44	1998	Harutoshi Fukui (ja)	Tuerubu Wai Ō (Twelve Y. O.)	
44	1998	Jun Ikeido (ja)	Hatsuru Soko Naki (果つる底なき)	
45	1999	Takeshi Shinno (ja)	Hachigatsu no Marukusu (八月のマルクス)	
46	2000	Urio Shudo (ja)	Nō Otoko (脳男)	
47	2001	Kazuaki Takano	Jūsan Kaidan (13階段)	
48	2002	Akihiro Miura (ja)	Horobi no Monokurōmu (滅びのモノクローム)	
49	2003	Mihiro Akai (ja)	Kageriyuku Natsu (翳りゆく夏)	
49	2003	Kyosuke Shiranui (ja)	Matchi Meiku (マッチメイク)	
50	2004	Yusuke Kamiyama (ja)	Katakonbe (カタコンベ)	
51	2005	Gaku Yakumaru (ja)	Tenshi no Naifu (天使のナイフ)	
52	2006	Ran Hayase (ja)	Sannen-zaka Hi no Yume (三年坂 火の夢)	
52	2006	Ren Kaburagi (ja)	Tōkyō Damoi (東京ダモイ)	
53	2007	Keisuke Sone (ja)	Chintei-gyo (沈底魚)	
54	2008	Kan Shoda (ja)	Yūkai-ji (誘拐児)	
54	2008	Hiromi Sueura (ja)	Ketsubetsu no Mori (訣別の森)	
55	2009	Takefumi Endo (ja)	Purizun Torikku (プリズン・トリック)	
56	2010	Dai Yokozeki (ja)	Saikai (再会)	
57	2011	Nanao Kawase (ja)	Yorozu no koto ni ki o tsukeyo (よろずのことに気をつけよ)	
57	2011	Mayumi Kumura (ja)	Kantō onsaito (完盗オンサイト)	
58	2012	Fumio Takano	Karamāzofu no imōto (カラマーゾフの妹)	
59	2013	Yusuke Takeyoshi (ja)	Shūmei-han (襲名犯)	
60	2014	Atsushi Shimomura (ja)	Yami ni Kaoru Uso (闇に香る嘘)	
61	2015	Katsuhiro Go (ja)	Dotoku no Jikan (道徳の時間)	
62	2016	Kiwamu Sato (ja)	QJKJQ	
63	2017	No winner	No winner	
64	2018	Eiichi Saitou (ja)	Totatsu Funo Kyoku (到達不能極)	
65	2019	Kazumi Jingo (神護 かずみ)	Noir wo Matou Onna (ノワールをまとう女)	
66	2020	Hiromi Sano (佐野 広実)	Watashi ga Kieru (わたしが消える)	
67	2021	Miki Fushio (伏尾 美紀)	Hokui 43 Do no Cold Case (北緯43度のコールドケース)	
68	2022	Akane Araki (ja)	Konoyo no Hate no Satsujin (此の世の果ての殺人)	

== Finalists available in English ==
Not a few finalists were published in Japan.

- 18 (1972) - Misa Yamamura (ja), The Dark Ring of Murder (黒の環状線, Kuro no Kanjosen)
- 26 (1980) - Soji Shimada, The Tokyo Zodiac Murders (占星術殺人事件, Sensei-jutsu Satsujin Jiken)

== See also ==
- Japanese detective fiction
- Mystery Writers of Japan
- Edogawa Rampo

Japanese mystery awards for unpublished novels

- Ayukawa Tetsuya Award
- Mephisto Prize
- Agatha Christie Award

Japanese mystery awards for best works published in the previous year

- Mystery Writers of Japan Award
- Honkaku Mystery Award
