= Kogarashi Monjirō =

- Also known as: 木枯し紋次郎
- Genre: Jidaigeki
- Directed by: Kon Ichikawa; Kenji Misumi; Kazuo Ikehiro; Kimiyoshi Yasuda
- Starring: Atsuo Nakamura
- Country of origin: Japan
- Original language: Japanese
- No. of episodes: 38

Production
- Running time: 45 minutes (per episode)
- Production companies: Fuji TV, C.A.L

Original release
- Network: Fuji TV
- Release: 1972 – 1973

Kogarashi Monjirō (木枯し紋次郎; lit. "Monjirō of the Cold Wind") is the main character and title of a Japanese novel by Saho Sasazawa, probably best known in the televised version broadcast during prime-time in 1972–1973, directed by Kon Ichikawa. In 1993, the drama was made into a film, titled Kaettekita Kogarashi Monjirō.

Monjirō is a drifter, iconic for his ragged straw hat and cape outfit and long toothpick in his mouth. His stock phrase was "It's nothing to do with me".

== Plot ==
Kogarashi Monjirō or "Monjirō of the Wintry North Wind" (Note: kogarashi, from ko 'tree' + karashi 'withering', literally "(something that) blows on trees and withers them". Defined as "strong cold wind that blows from autumn to early winter". Glossed as "a cold [wintry] wind; a nipping [biting] winter wind" (Kenkyusha College Japanese-English, 6th ed., 1996.)) (see §Characters below) is a toseinin (a profession-less gambler (Note: Kojien's definition of toseinin does list "yakuza", but defines the latter only as a gambler (bakuchi-uchi), not as a member of an organized crime association, which is the contemporary common meaning.)) in the Edo period. He travels alone.

He is exiled to the island of Hachijō-jima taking blame for a crime committed by a friend, but when the friend breaches the vow of silence in order to protest Mojirō's innocence, it shatters his faith in people.

== Characters ==
Kogarashi Monjirō

The character is known for always having a long toothpick protruding from his mouth, (Note: One source says he chews on a "long reed of grass".) which sometimes served as a weapon. He wears a weather-beaten sandogasa hat (type of kasa hat), and a dingy kappa cloak. (Note: A kasa is woven from strands of rush, sedge, or straw, or strips of bamboo...)

He also has a famous punch line, which was "Asshi ni wa kakawari no nei koto de gozansu "It's nothing to do with me" or "It does not concern me", and characterized as a "nihilistic gambler" or "nihilistic wandering outlaw hero".

He is a wanderer (watari-mono), and a skilled swordsman, who winds up aiding people he meets in his wayfaring journey, but he maintains he does not act out of altruism or sense of justice, but only retaliates against those who provoke his anger.

== Television production ==
Film director Kon Ichikawa agreed to take the helm for the TV production partly for financial reasons, hoping to accrue enough capital to fund his cinematic works. The role of Monjirō was played by then-budding actor Atsuo Nakamura. Nakamura Atsuo himself directed episode 8, second season, "Kemonomichi ni namida wo suteta" (獣道に涙を捨てた).

Monjirō, especially the TV version, has achieved folk-hero status. The TV show reached 30% rating, and resulted in the opening of the Monjirō exhibit, and the sales of Monjirō manjū sweets and ramen noodles.

The production was plagued with problems. The lead actor Nakamura injured his Achilles tendon which disrupted filming, and the series had to go into recess and the hole filled by another program. The troubled production company, Daiei Kyoto also fell into bankruptcy.

In 1977, Shin Kogarashi Monjirō was broadcast on TV Tokyo, airing for 26 episodes. Atsuo Nakamura himself directed in three episodes.

== Other adaptations ==
Sadao Nakajima directed the 1972 film version in which the lead role was played by Bunta Sugawara.

It has also been adapted into manga by Goseki Kojima, famous for his samurai comic series Lone Wolf and Cub read not only in the United States but internationally.

== Analysis ==
The wanderer who can be classed with other television and on-screen heroes like Zatōichi or and an academic study compares them with the Japanese folk belief in marebito, wandering spirits who help humankind.

== See also ==
- Kaettekita Kogarashi Monjirō
