= Roar: A Star in the Abyss =

Japanese manga series

- First tankōbon volume cover

ロア ～奈落のヒロイン～ (Roa Naraku no Hiroin)
- Genre: Drama; Thriller
- Manga
- Written by: Ai Okaue
- Published by: Kodansha
- English publisher: NA: Kodansha USA
- Imprint: KC Be Love
- Magazine: Palcy
- Original run: May 30, 2023 – present
- Volumes: 4
- icon

Roar: A Star in the Abyss (Japanese: ロア ～奈落のヒロイン～, Hepburn: Roa Naraku no Hiroin) is a Japanese web manga series written and illustrated by Ai Okaue. It has been serialized on Kodansha's Pixiv-based Palcy manga app since May 2023.

== Plot ==
Misato spends her early years in an idyllic setting, raised by loving parents on an island in Japan. Her peaceful existence is abruptly disrupted when a television production films in the area, and she is selected for a minor role. This seemingly insignificant opportunity becomes a turning point when a woman arrives, asserting herself as Misato's biological mother. Soon after, Misato is taken from her modest upbringing and placed in an extravagant estate, where she finds herself surrounded by opportunists and manipulators. What initially appears to be a fortunate twist of fate instead marks the beginning of a harrowing descent, as the once-innocent girl is forced to navigate a world of deceit—and discovers that vengeance may be her only recourse.

== Publication ==
Written and illustrated by Ai Okaue, Roar: A Star in the Abyss started on Kodansha's Pixiv-based Palcy manga app on May 30, 2023. Kodansha has collected its chapters into individual tankōbon volumes, with the first one released on December 13, 2023.

The manga has been licensed for English release in North America by Kodansha USA.

=== Volumes ===
No.	Original release date	Original ISBN	English release date	English ISBN
1	December 13, 2023	978-4-06-533731-8	June 3, 2025	979-8-88877-488-5
2	April 12, 2024	978-4-06-535303-5	—	—
3	August 9, 2024	978-4-06-536625-7	—	—
4	December 13, 2024	978-4-06-537829-8	—	—

== Reception ==
Kara Dennison of Otaku USA compared the series to tragic narratives like Candy Candy and Oshi no Ko, praising its emotional depth and drama. She noted how the protagonist's abrupt transition from rural life to abusive exploitation creates compelling tension, with artwork that effectively contrasts innocence and cruelty. While the first volume primarily establishes the protagonist's suffering, Dennison found its groundwork promising for future revelations.

== See also ==
- Guilty, another manga series by the same author
