= Guilty (manga) =

Japanese manga series by Ai Okaue

- Cover of volume 1 of the Japanese version, first released on June 13, 2018

ギルティ〜鳴かぬ蛍が身を焦がす〜 (Giruti: Nakanu Hotaru ga Mi o Kogasu)
- Genre: Romance, suspense
- Manga
- Written by: Ai Okaue
- Published by: Kodansha
- English publisher: NA: Kodansha USA
- Imprint: Be Love KC
- Magazine: Manga Ōkoku
- Original run: September 1, 2017 – October 30, 2022
- Volumes: 13
- Television drama

Guilty: Kono Koi wa Tsumi desu ka? (ギルティ〜この恋は罪ですか?〜)
- Directed by: Yo Kawahara
- Written by: Yōko Izumisawa
- Music by: Hanae Nakamura; Natsumi Tabuchi
- Studio: ytv, Telepack
- Original network: NNS (ytv, Nippon TV)
- Original run: April 2, 2020 – August 6, 2020
- Episodes: 10

Guilty (Japanese: ギルティ〜鳴かぬ蛍が身を焦がす〜, Hepburn: Giruti: Nakanu Hotaru ga Mi o Kogasu; lit. "Guilty: The Silent Firefly Gets Burned") is a Japanese manga series by Ai Okaue. Guilty is serialized digitally on Manga Ōkoku from September 1, 2017, to October 30, 2022. A live-action television drama adaptation titled Guilty: Kono Koi wa Tsumi desu ka? (ギルティ〜この恋は罪ですか?〜; lit. "Guilty: Is This Love a Sin?") was broadcast from April 2, 2020, to August 6, 2020, as part of Yomiuri TV, Nippon Television and their affiliates as part of the MokuDra F programming block.

== Plot ==
Sayaka Ogino is a 35-year-old editor of a fashion magazine living with her husband of 10 years, Kazuma. Despite a seemingly perfect life, Sayaka wants children but Kazuma does not, and she confides her troubles to her friend Rui Oikawa. To her surprise, Sayaka eventually learns that Kazuma is cheating on her with Rui, and that Rui is fixated on ruining her life. The more Sayaka learns of Rui's lies, the more unpleasant secrets she learns about the people close to her.

== Characters ==
Sayaka Ogino (荻野 爽, Ogino Sayaka)
Portrayed by: Yua Shinkawa
Sayaka is an editor of a fashion magazine.
Kazuma Ogino (荻野一真, Ogino Kazuma)
Portrayed by: Teppei Koike
Kazuma is Sayaka's husband of 10 years who works at a high-paying position at an advertising company.
Rui Oikawa (及川瑠衣, Oikawa Rui)
Portrayed by: Yurika Nakamura
Rui is Sayaka's friend, who is younger than her.
Keiichi Akiyama (秋山 慶一, Akiyama Keiichi)
Portrayed by: Keita Machida
Akiyama is Sayaka's ex-boyfriend from high school and the owner of an Italian restaurant.
Mutsuki Terashima (寺嶋 睦月, Terashima Mutsuki)
Portrayed by: Fūju Kamio
Terashima is a university student who works as an intern at Sayaka's company.

== Media ==
=== Manga ===
Guilty is written and illustrated by Ai Okaue. It began serialization digitally on the Manga Ōkoku website on September 1, 2017. The chapters were later released in eight tankōbon volumes by Kodansha under the Be Love KC imprint. On April 30, 2021, the series entered its final arc. The series ended serialization on October 30, 2022.

At the New York Comic Con 2019, Kodansha USA announced that they had licensed the series in English for North American distribution, with the volumes distributed digitally.

No.	Original release date	Original ISBN	English release date	English ISBN
1	June 13, 2018	978-4-06-511906-8	October 29, 2019	978-1-6421-2313-5
2	September 13, 2018	978-4-06-512782-7	November 26, 2019	978-1-64-659133-6
3	December 13, 2018	978-4-06-514102-1	December 24, 2019	978-1-64-659176-3
4	April 12, 2019	978-4-06-515544-8	January 28, 2020	978-1-64-659220-3
5	August 9, 2019	978-4-06-516705-2	February 25, 2020	978-1-64-659248-7
6	March 13, 2020	978-4-06-518701-2	August 25, 2020	978-1-64-659659-1
7	August 12, 2020	978-4-06-520509-9	December 29, 2020	978-1-64-659883-0
8	February 12, 2021	978-4-06-522430-4	July 6, 2021	978-1-63-699214-3
9	October 13, 2021	978-4-06-526125-5	March 8, 2022	978-1-63-699650-9
10	February 10, 2022	978-4-06-527246-6	August 30, 2022	978-1-68-491413-5
11	August 12, 2022	978-4-06-528487-2	January 31, 2023	978-1-68-491661-0
12	February 13, 2023	978-4-06-530735-9	August 29, 2023	979-8-88-933106-3
13	June 13, 2023	978-4-06-530899-8	December 12, 2023	979-8-88-933280-0

=== Television drama ===
A live-action television series adaptation titled Guilty: Kono Koi wa Tsumi desu ka? (ギルティ〜この恋は罪ですか?〜) was announced in the April 2020 issue of the manga magazine Be Love. The series aired on April 2, 2020, on YTV, Nippon Television and their affiliates as part of the MokuDra F programming block. It stars Yua Shinkawa as Sayaka Ogino. Gekidan Exile member Keita Machida, Teppei Koike, Yurika Nakamura, and Fuju Kamio were later announced as cast members. Additional cast members are Eri Tokunaga, Miwako Kakei, Ayaka Ōnishi, Ryouhei Abe, and Mijika Nagai. The series is directed by Yo Kawahara, with Yōko Izumisawa in charge of the script. The opening theme song is "Be All Right" by Toshi, released as his first original song on a major record label in 22 years.

After the broadcast of the first three episodes, the series was delayed due to the COVID-19 pandemic. From April 23 to May 7, 2020, the first three episodes were rebroadcast as television specials with commentary. The series resumed broadcast on June 25, 2020. A special episode titled "The Door of Sin" was released exclusively on Hulu on July 9, 2020. Dori Sakurada made a special guest appearance beginning with episode 8 as Moriya, an editorial staff member of a weekly tabloid magazine and an original character made for the television series.

== Reception ==
In 2019, Guilty had sold a consecutive total of 1.5 million physical and digital copies.

== See also ==
- Roar: A Star in the Abyss, another manga series by the same author
