= The Magical Girl and the Evil Lieutenant Used to Be Archenemies =

Japanese manga series

- First tankōbon volume cover

かつて魔法少女と悪は敵対していた。 (Katsute Mahō Shōjo to Aku wa Tekitai Shiteita)
- Genre: Fantasy romance; Comedy
- Manga
- Written by: Cocoa Fujiwara
- Published by: Square Enix
- English publisher: NA: Yen Press
- Imprint: Gangan Comics Joker
- Magazine: Monthly Gangan Joker
- Original run: September 21, 2013 – March 20, 2015
- Volumes: 3
- Anime television series
- Directed by: Akiyo Ohashi
- Written by: Yuniko Ayana
- Music by: Mayuko
- Studio: Bones
- Licensed by: Crunchyroll
- Original network: AT-X, Tokyo MX, BS11
- Original run: July 9, 2024 – September 24, 2024
- Episodes: 12
- icon

The Magical Girl and the Evil Lieutenant Used to Be Archenemies (Japanese: かつて魔法少女と悪は敵対していた。, Hepburn: Katsute Mahō Shōjo to Aku wa Tekitai Shiteita) is a Japanese four-panel manga series written and illustrated by Cocoa Fujiwara. It follows the lieutenant of an evil organization who falls in love with the magical girl sent to defeat it. The manga was serialized in Square Enix's Monthly Gangan Joker magazine from September 2013 to March 2015, with its chapters collected into three tankōbon volumes. An anime television series adaptation produced by Bones aired from July to September 2024.

== Characters ==
Mira (ミラ)
Voiced by: Yūki Ono
Byakuya Mimori (深森 白夜, Mimori Byakuya)
Voiced by: Mai Nakahara
Cat Familiar (御使い（猫）, Mitsukai (Neko))
Voiced by: Shin-ichiro Miki
Hibana Kagari (篝 火花, Kagari Hibana)
Voiced by: Mariya Ise
Bird Familiar (御使い（鳥）, Mitsukai (Tori))
Voiced by: Hikaru Midorikawa
Fomalhaut (フォーマルハウト, Fōmaruhauto)
Voiced by: Kenichi Suzumura
Bellatrix (ベラトリックス, Beratorikkusu)
Voiced by: Ayako Kawasumi
Alcyone (アルキオネ, Arukione)
Voiced by: Hiro Shimono
Spica (スピカ, Supika)
Voiced by: Nao Tōyama
Sadalsudh (サダルスウド, Sadarusuudo)
Voiced by: Takumi Yamazaki
Betelgeuse (ベテルギウス, Beterugiusu)
Voiced by: Takaya Hashi

== Media ==
=== Manga ===
Written and illustrated by Cocoa Fujiwara, The Magical Girl and the Evil Lieutenant Used to Be Archenemies began serialization in Square Enix's Monthly Gangan Joker magazine on September 21, 2013. The series was left unfinished following Fujiwara's death on March 31, 2015, with the chapter published on March 20 serving as the finale. The third and final tankōbon volume was released posthumously on March 22, 2016, after consulting with her family.

In February 2024, Yen Press announced that it licensed the series for English publication. The company released the series as an omnibus volume on August 27, 2024.

==== Volumes ====
No.	Original release date	Original ISBN	English release date	English ISBN
1	July 22, 2014	978-4-7575-4360-7	August 27, 2024	978-1-9753-9410-3
2	December 22, 2014	978-4-7575-4509-0	August 27, 2024	978-1-9753-9410-3
3	March 22, 2016	978-4-7575-4916-6	August 27, 2024	978-1-9753-9410-3

=== Anime ===
An anime television series adaptation was announced by Avex Pictures during its Anime NYC panel in November 2023. It was produced by Bones and directed by Akiyo Ohashi, with scripts written by Yuniko Ayana, character designs handled by Haruko Iizuka, and music composed by Mayuko. Several voice actors reprised their roles from the drama CD adaptation released in 2015. The series aired from July 9 to September 24, 2024, on AT-X and other networks. The opening theme song is "Mikansei Rendezvous" (未完成ランデヴー; lit. 'Incomplete Rendezvous'), performed by Lezel, and the ending theme song is "Itsumo Futari ga Īi ne" (いつも二人がいいね; lit. 'It's Nice That the Two of Them Are Always Together'), performed by Yūki Ono and Mai Nakahara. Crunchyroll is streaming the series.

==== Episodes ====
No.	Title	Directed by	Storyboarded by	Original release date
1	"Won't Kill for Love"; Transliteration: "Kuroshi Awanai" (Japanese: 殺し愛(あ)わない)	Takayuki Yamamoto	Akiyo Ohashi	July 9, 2024
2	"The (Taking Down of the) Magical Girl Belongs to (No One but) Me"; Transliteration: "Mahō Shōjo (o Taosu Shimei, Sore) wa (Hoka Demonai) Watashi no Mono da" (Japanese: 魔法少女（を倒す使命、それ）は（他でもない）私のものだ)	Takayuki Yamamoto	Akiyo Ohashi	July 16, 2024
3	"Now Back to the Drawing Board"; Transliteration: "Soshite Furidashi e" (Japanese: そしてふりだしへ)	Kenta Kushitani	Kenta Kushitani	July 23, 2024
4	"A Habit of Chasing What Moves"; Transliteration: "Ugoku Mono o Oshūsei ga Arimasu" (Japanese: 動くものを追う習性があります)	Hiroo Nagano	Hitoyuki Matsui	July 30, 2024
5	"We're Enemies"; Transliteration: "Wareware wa Tekitai Shiteiru" (Japanese: 我々は敵対している)	Hitomi Ezoe	Akiyo Ohashi	August 6, 2024
6	"What Magical Girls Are"; Transliteration: "Mahō Shōjo to Wa" (Japanese: 魔法少女とは)	Masayuki Otsuki	Takayuki Yamamoto	August 13, 2024
7	"They're Friends...?"; Transliteration: "Yūjin…?" (Japanese: 友人…？)	Hiroo Nagano	Hiroo Nagano	August 20, 2024
8	"Before Christmas"; Transliteration: "Kurisumasu no Mae ni" (Japanese: クリスマスの前に)	Masayuki Otsuki	Takuya Igarashi	August 27, 2024
9	"On Christmas Night"; Transliteration: "Kurisumasu no Yoru ni" (Japanese: クリスマスの夜に)	Kenta Kushitani	Takuya Igarashi	September 3, 2024
10	"A Day with Mr. Familiar"; Transliteration: "Gotsukai-san to no Ichi Nichi" (Japanese: 御使いさんとの一日)	Hitomi Ezoe	Hitomi Ezoe	September 10, 2024
11	"53-Year Old Building"; Transliteration: "Chiku Gojūsan-nen desu" (Japanese: 築五十三年です)	Masayuki Otsuki	Takuya Igarashi	September 17, 2024
12	"Side B / Side M"	Akiyo Ohashi	Akiyo Ohashi	September 24, 2024

== Reception ==
The series was ranked nineteenth alongside Asobiai in the 2015 edition of Takarajimasha's Kono Manga ga Sugoi! list of best manga for male readers.
