= Fūju Kamio =

Japanese actor (born 1999)

- 神尾 楓珠
- Kamio in 2019
- Born: January 21, 1999 (age 27); Koiwa, Edogawa, Tokyo, Japan
- Occupation: Actor
- Years active: 2015–present
- Agent: Coccinelle Entertainment
- Spouse: Yurina Hirate (m. 2026)
- Website: kamiofuju.com

Fūju Kamio (Japanese: 神尾 楓珠, Hepburn: Kamio Fūju; born January 21, 1999) is a Japanese actor.

== Career ==
Taking an interest in acting as a teenager, Kamio decided to quit his high school soccer club and began his acting career. As he was a fan of Hideaki Itō, he auditioned for the same agency and passed, although Itō would later leave the agency in 2022.

In the same year in 2015, Kamio made his television debut in Mother, I'm Fine, a drama special for 24Hour Television: Love Saves the Earth.

He starred as Aran Maki, the 17-year-old prime minister of an experimental city, in Teen Regime, reuniting with Anna Yamada, whom he costarred with in What She Likes....

In May 2021, he made his first starring role in short film, "10 Years wondering in Shibuya - A Decade of Roaming"

Kamio announced he had left his agency on December 31, 2023.

== Personal life ==
Kamio was born on January 21, 1999, in Koiwa, Edogawa, Tokyo. He has been a soccer player since he was a child and originally dreamed of being an athlete.

=== Marriage ===
In February 2026, Kamio announced his marriage to actress, singer and former Keyakizaka46 member Yurina Hirate.

== Filmography ==
=== Films ===
Year	Title	Role	Notes	Ref(s)
2017	My Brother Loves Me Too Much	Suzuki (Note: Reprising from the television series of the same name.)		
2019	My Butler Says			
2019	High&Low The Worst	Nakagoshi		
2020	Rolling Marbles	Yūya		
2020	Kiss Him, Not Me	Yūsuke Igarashi		
2020	Beautiful Dreamer	Cameo		
2021	Suicide Forest Village	Teru Akutsu		
2021	Back Red	Yūto / Tsutomu Harashima		
2021	A Decade of Roaming	Youth A	Lead role; short film	
2021	What She Likes...	Jun Andō	Lead role	
2022	Intimate Stranger	Inoue Yuji	Lead role	
2022	Soul at Twenty	Taigi Asano	Lead role	
2022	Love Is Light	Saijō	Lead role	
2022	High&Low The Worst X	Nakagoshi		
2022	Re/Member	Atsushi Kiyomiya		
2025	Under the Big Onion	Takeru Tsutsumi	Lead role	
2025	Ya Boy Kongming! The Movie	Sima Run		
2025	Blank Canvas: My So-Called Artist's Journey	Nishimura		
2025	Beethoven Fabrication	Karl Holz		
2025	Re/Member: The Last Night	Atsushi Kiyomiya		
2026	Kingdom 5: The Clash of Souls	Wang Ben		
2027	Darwin's Game	Ryūji		

=== Television ===
Year	Title	Role	Notes	Ref(s)
2015	Mother, I'm Fine	Soccer club member	Drama special	
2015	General Johnny		Episode 4	
2016	A Love That Resembles Destiny	Yurin Ozawa (young)		
2017	My Brother Loves Me Too Much	Suzuki from the Kendo club		
2017	Akira and Akira	Ei Yamazaki (middle and high school)		
2017	Princess in Prison	Kōtarō Baba		
2018	Unnatural	Shinya Yokoyama	Episode 7	
2018	Signal	Ryōta Katō		
2018	Koi no Tsuki	Yumeaki Iko		
2018	Let's Go Build Your Gravestone	Nana Ishikawa's younger brother		
2019	Mr. Hiiragi's Homeroom	Kakeru Makabe		
2019	Toritsu Mizusho! ~Reiwa~	Amane Imai		
2019	High&Low: The Worst Episode.O	Nakagoshi		
2019	Hidarikiki no Eren	Kōichi Asakura	Lead role	
2019	Nippon Noir: The Rebellion of Detective Y	Kakeru Makabe (Note: Reprising role from Mr. Hiiragi's Homeroom.)	Episode 7	
2020	In the Blunt Box	Ritsu Sanada		
2020	Guilty	Mutsuki Terashima		
2020	Sunday THE Real!: Actual Scoop! Then the Judge Said Vol. 2	Boy		
2020	THE MUSIC DAY: Yazawa Eikichi Special Drama	Eikichi Yazawa	Lead role	
2020	Ikebukuro Police Station Criminal Division Kanzaki, Kuroki	Toshiki Yoshimura	Episode 2	
2020–21	Nice! Hikaru Genji	Kain		
2021	My Dear Exes	Tobi Nakajima	Episode 3	
2021	Love Starting from a Lie	Haruhiko Izumi		
2021	Emergency Interrogation Room (season 4)	Kōichirō Kagami	Episode 3	
2021	A Story of "Grappler Baki" and Me	Daiju Shibamoto		
2021	Face Only Teacher	Issei Endō	Lead role	
2022	I Want to Hold Aono-kun so Badly I Could Die	Masayoshi Fujimoto		
2022	Teacher's Welcome	Shima Kijo from the delivery company		
2022	Namba MG5	Naoki Godai		
2022	Teen Regime	Aran Maki	Lead role	
2022	The Old Dog, New Tricks?	Naoto Igaki	Episodes 4–10	
2022	Scary Story That Really Happened "Emergency Call"	Ryōta Takahashi	Lead role	
2022	Van Gogh Under the Stairs	Shintarō Taira		
2023	Cinderella of Midsummer	Takumi Makino		
2023	My Beloved Flower	Momiji Satō	Lead role	
2024	Kururi: Who's in Love with Me	Yuuki Asahi		
2027	The Shogunate Rebel	Tokugawa Iemochi	Taiga drama	

=== Music video appearances ===
Year	Title	Artist	Ref(s)
2016	"Distance from You"	Sonoko Inoue	
2018	"Sokkenai"	Radwimps	
2019	"Sing Out!"	Nogizaka46	
2020	"Dream of Wheels"	Yuuki Tokunaga	
2020	"Sunny drop"	Novelbright	
2021	"STARTLINE"	Sakurako Ohara	
2021	"Sangenshoku"	Yoasobi	
2021	"Empathy"	Asian Kung-Fu Generation	

== Awards ==
Year	Award	Category	Work(s)	Result	Ref.
2023	44th Yokohama Film Festival	Best Newcomer	Love Is Light	Won	
