= The Decagon House Murders =

1987 novel by Yukito Ayatsuji

- Author: Yukito Ayatsuji
- Translator: Ho-Ling Wong
- Language: Japanese
- Genre: Mystery
- Published: 1987 (JP); 2015 (EN)
- Publication place: Japan
- ISBN: 1508503737

The Decagon House Murders (Japanese: 十角館の殺人, Hepburn: Jukkakukan no Satsujin) is a 1987 Japanese mystery novel, the debut work of author Yukito Ayatsuji. Borrowing its basic plot structure from Agatha Christie's And Then There Were None (Christie's book is directly referenced by some of the characters at several points), it tells the story of a group of seven university students who travel to a deserted island that was the scene of a grisly mass murder six months earlier, where events soon turn ominous. The Decagon House Murders belongs to the honkaku subgenre of mystery fiction.

Locked Room International published the first English-language edition of the novel in 2015. The second English-language edition was published in December 2020 by Pushkin Press, and in July 2021 the manga adaptation, illustrated by Hiro Kiyohara, was announced for publication in America.

The nature of the work had been deemed impossible for adaptation into visual media, but in 2024, it was announced that it would be adapted into a streaming drama. The TV series adaptation was released on March 22, 2024.

== Plot ==
An unnamed character writes down and seals their plan to murder a group of "sinners" in a green bottle and throws it into the ocean.

Seven student members of a university mystery club travel to Tsunojima Island, an uninhabited island off the coast of Japan, for a week-long vacation. The students refer to each other by nicknames honoring famous mystery writers - Ellery, Poe, Carr, Leroux, Van, Agatha, and Orczy. Six months earlier, the owner of the island, an architect named Nakamura Seiji, was brutally murdered alongside his wife and housekeepers in a house fire, and the case remains unsolved. Soon after their arrival, the students discover seven nameplates identifying five "victims", one "murderer", and one "detective". While they initially believe it to be a prank from someone amongst their group, two of their members die under mysterious circumstances in the following days - Orczy is strangled in her bed and Carr is poisoned by a cup of coffee. In both cases, the victim's hand is cut off, reminiscent of how Seiji's wife was murdered. The remaining members are unable to contact the mainland and grow increasingly paranoid.

Meanwhile, on the mainland, a former member of the club named Kawaminami receives a letter accusing the club members of murdering Chiori, Seiji's daughter, who died of alcohol poisoning at a party a year earlier. After learning that his friend and fellow club member, Morisu, also received the same letter, Kawaminami visits Seiji's brother Kojiro. Kojiro's friend Shimada joins Kawaminama's investigation and begins to suspect that Seiji is not dead and that his burned corpse was actually that of the gardener, the chief murder suspect who was never found. They learn that Seiji was not close to Chiori and Shimada correctly deducts that Chiori was the love child of Kojiro and Seiji's wife and that, following Chiori's death, Seiji killed his wife out of vengeance. While initially serving as "armchair detective," Morisu is disturbed by Shimada's shameless investigation of such personal matters and asks not to be included in their search for answers.

On the island, Agatha dies after applying a poisoned lipstick and Leroux is found beaten to death outside. After discovering a secret underground room in the mansion ruins, Ellery becomes convinced that the killer is someone outside the group and that Seiji is the one committing the murders. Poe dies after smoking a poisoned cigarette, leaving Ellery and Van as the final two survivors. They find another secret passageway under the decagon house kitchen, where they discover a decaying corpse. That night, the decagon house burns to the ground.

Back on the mainland, the police question Kawaminama and Morisu due to their involvement with the mystery club. The newly discovered corpse is identified as the gardener's, ruling out the possibility that Seiji is alive. The police conclude that Ellery, having been discovered doused in kerosene, is the culprit and that he committed the murder-suicide as a copycat reenactment of Seiji's crime. However, Kawaminami tells the police that only six students were vacationing on the island, confirmed by the six bodies discovered after the fire.

It is revealed that Morisu is the seventh student - Van - and that he plotted the murders to avenge Chiori, his secret lover. While the six others believed he was vacationing with them, he did not inform anyone else on the mainland of his plans to join them. Using a fake illness as an excuse, he was able to go to bed early the first new nights and return to the mainland via motorboat, where his "investigation" with Kawaminami and Shimada served as his alibi. After killing off most of the group, he drugged Ellery with sleeping pills and set the house ablaze, staging it as a murder-suicide committed by Ellery. The police are satisfied and the case is closed.

Some time later, Shimada approaches Morisu on the beach and begins to voice his belief that there was another form of foul play involved in the decagon house murders. Morisu shuts him down and walks away, only to discover the green bottle he had thrown into the ocean lying in the sand nearby. Accepting his judgement, he asks one of the children playing on the beach to give the bottle to Shimada.
