= Yua Shinkawa =

Japanese actress and model (born 1993)

- 新川 優愛
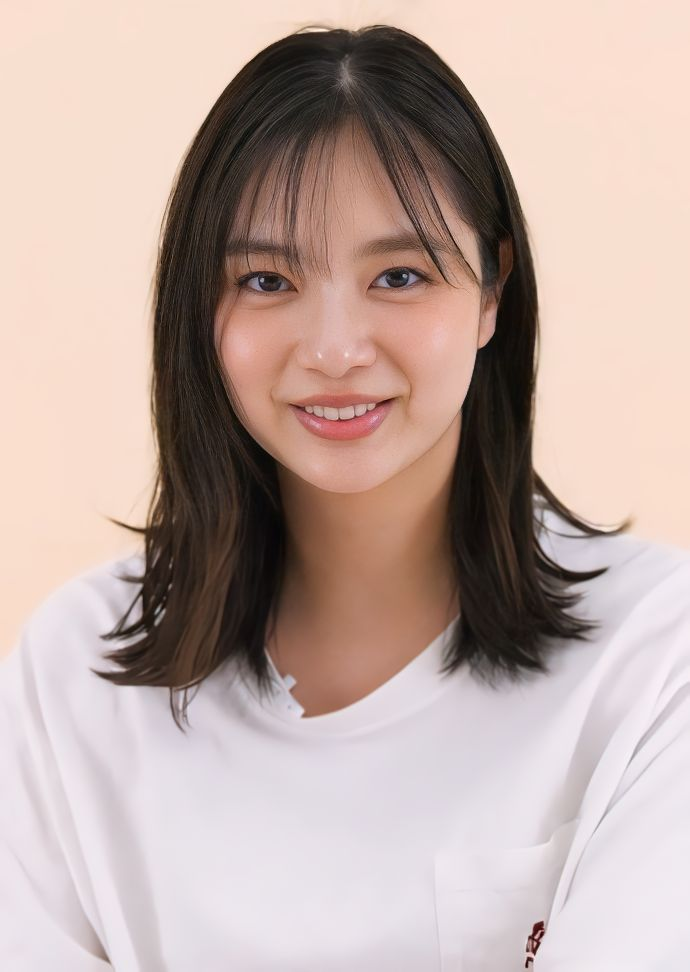
- Shinkawa in May 2024
- Born: 28 December 1993 (age 32); Saitama, Japan
- Occupations: Actress; gravure model
- Years active: 2007–present
- Agent: Gekidan Tohai
- Children: 1
- Website: tohai.co.jp

Yua Shinkawa (新川 優愛, Shinkawa Yua; born December 28, 1993 in Saitama) is a Japanese actress and model.

== Career ==
Shinkawa made her screen debut in the television drama Chōnan no Kekkon in 2008, and made her film debut in the 2010 film Matataki in which Keiko Kitagawa played the lead role. In 2010, she won the Miss Magazine 2010. Next year, she won the Miss Seventeen 2011. She was one of four winners chosen from 7,157 applicants. Then she started model activities as an exclusive model in the Seventeen magazine. On October 30, 2013, she debut as a singer with her first single de-light. This song was used as the ending theme in the tokusatsu drama Shōgeki Gōraigan!! aired on TV Tokyo, and it reached 45th in Oricon chart.

In May 2015, it was announced that she would graduate from Seventeen, then subsequently contracted with the Non-no magazine. She appeared on the cover of the August 2015 issue of Non-no. From October 2015, she will play the heroine in the NTV's midnight drama Seishun Tantei Haruya.

== Personal life ==
On August 9, 2019, Shinkawa's agency announced that she had married her non-celebrity partner.

On November 17, 2022, she announced that she was expecting the couple's first child, who is due around May next year. And on May 10, 2023, she gave birth to the couple's first child.

== Filmography ==
=== Films ===
Year	Title	Role	Notes	Ref.
2010	Piecing Me Back Together	Makiko Kirino (teen)		
2011	Ike! Danshi Kōkō Engekibu	Mai Katsuragi		
2012	Kyō, Koi o Hajimemasu	Sakura Hibino		
2014	Blue Spring Ride	Shūko Murao		
2016	Unrequited Love	Mana		
2017	Megamisama			
2018	My Teacher, My Love	Shūka Saimon		
2021	What Happened to Our Nest Egg!?	Mayumi Gotō		
2022	The Way of the Househusband	Kasumi		

=== Television dramas ===
Year	Title	Role	Notes	Ref.
2008	Chōnan no Kekkon: Hanayome wa Batsuichi! Toshiue! Komochi!?	Aki Ōyama		
2010	Atsuizo! Nekogaya!!			
2011	Hitori Janai	Nami Tachibana		
2011	Asu no Hikari o Tsukame	Moeko Sasaki		
2011	Ore no Sora Keiji-hen	Arisa Ijūin	Episode 5	
2012	Tokumei Sentai Go-Busters	Reika Saotome / Pink Buster	Episode 41	
2012	Toshi Densetsu no Onna	Risa Toyama	Episode 4	
2012	Ataru		Episode 6	
2012	Papadoru	Chiemi	Episode 5-6	
2012	GTO	Anko Uehara		
2013	35-sai no Koukousei	Mitsuki Kudō		
2013	Honto ni Atta Kowai Hanashi Natsu no Tokubetsu-hen 2013	Arisa Takeuchi		
2013	Shōgeki Gōraigan!!	Hitomi Kai		
2013	Jinsei Gokko	Mako		
2014	Yoru no Sensei	Kaede Tachibana		
2014	Keiji	Miyako Akiba		
2014	Water Polo Yankees	Rei Fujisaki		
2014	Shinano no Colombo Jiken File 2	Yūko Noya		
2015	Ōedo Sōsamō 2015: Onmitsu Dōshin, Aku o Kiru!	Okitsu		
2015	Zeni no Sensō	Akane Madoka		
2015	Kekkon ni Ichiban Chikakute Tōi Onna	Yuri Sudō		
2015	Risk no Kamisama	Chinami Hōjō		
2015	Koinaka	Kazuha Sawada		
2015	Seishun Tantei Haruya	Miwa Nōmi		
2016	Gu.ra.me!	Yūko Tachibana		
2016	IQ246	Hitomi Hōmonji		
2017	School Counselor	Nao Oomiya		
2018	Sick's Spec Saga			
2018	Itsumademo Shiroi Hane	Rumi Kizaki		
2020	Guilty	Sayaka Ogino		
2020	Detective Yuri Rintaro	Ruriko Kusaka		
2021	The Grand Family			
2022	Come Come Everybody	Sayoko Fujii		

== Bibliography ==
=== Magazines ===
- Seventeen, Shueisha 1967-, as an exclusive model from 2011 to 2015
- Non-no, Shueisha 1971-, as an exclusive model from since 2015

== Discography ==
=== Singles ===
- de-light (Avex Marketing, 30 October 2013) EAN 4988064487837

== Awards ==
- Miss Magazine 2010: Won
- Miss Seventeen 2011: Won
