= Ayumu Mochizuki =

Japanese actor (born 2000)

- 望月 歩
- Born: September 28, 2000 (age 25); Sasebo, Nagasaki, Japan
- Occupation: Actor
- Years active: 2014–present

Ayumu Mochizuki (Japanese: 望月 歩, Hepburn: Mochizuki Ayumu; born September 28, 2000) is a Japanese actor. In 2015, he made his acting debut in Solomon's Perjury, based on Miyuki Miyabe's novel of the same name. He has since appeared in Yell, the 102nd asadora series, and also played supporting roles in Mr. Hiiragi's Homeroom and Kansantsui Asagao. Mochizuki starred in 5 Million Dollar Life in 2019.

== Filmography ==
=== Film ===
Year	Title	Role	Notes	Ref(s)
2015	Solomon's Perjury	Takuya Kashiwagi		
2019	5 Million Dollar Life	Nozomi Takatsuki	Lead role	
2022	Homestay	Mitsuru Kobayashi		
2022	Yokai Housemate: Is He Prince Charming?	Aito		
2023	Kamui no Uta	Hisashi		
2024	Last Mile	Kazuma Shirai		
2026	Nameless			
2026	Erica	Tatsuki Iizasa	Lead role	

=== Television ===
Year	Title	Role	Notes	Ref(s)
2015	461 Bento Boxes Are a Promise Between Father and Son	Tōi Watanabe		
2018	Unnatural	Kazuma Shirai	Episode 7	
2018	Silent Voice: Behavioral Psychology Investigator Ema Tateoka	Ayumu Higashimura	Episode 5	
2019	Mr. Hiiragi's Homeroom	Yūdai Seo		
2019	Sign: The Case of Forensic Scientist Takashi Yuzuki	Takashi Yuzuki (student era)	Episodes 4–5	
2020	Kotaki Brothers and Hardships	Eita Sakai	Episode 3	
2020	In the Blunt Box	Satoru Shōji		
2020	Kasai no Hito	Akira Tachibana		
2020	Nina, My Love	Masayuki Oshikawa		
2020	Midsummer Boy ~ 19452020	Yū Sena		
2020	Kansatsui Asagao (season 2)	Shōma Ushijima		
2021	Captivated, by You	Shōtarō Yamada		
2021	Awaiting Kirin	Hosokawa Tadaoki	Taiga drama	
2021	Dive!!	Reiji Maruyama		
2021	Hatsujōji made Ichijikan	Yoshiki	Lead role	
2021	My Love Mix-Up!	Jun Tomita		
2022	Ex-Boyfriend's Will	Masuya Kuroushi	Episodes 3–8, 11	
2022	Teen Regime	Kan Hayashi		
2023	Knockin' On Locked Door	Tatsuya Shinomiya	Episode 1	
2024	The Decagon House Murders	Ellery		
2024	The Tiger and Her Wings	Yūzaburō Takase	Asadora	
2024	My Diary	Toranosuke Wada		
2025	Synanthrope	Tetsuya Tamaru		
