= The Decagon House Murders (TV series) =

2024 Japanese television series

Japanese name
- Kanji: 十角館の殺人
Transcriptions
- Revised Hepburn: Jūkakukan no satsujin
- Genre: Mystery, Drama
- Based on: The Decagon House Murders by Yukito Ayatsuji
- Written by: Kaori Fujii; Hiroyuki Yatsu; Madoka Hayano
- Directed by: Akira Uchikata
- Country of origin: Japan
- Original language: Japanese
- No. of episodes: 5

Original release
- Network: Hulu Japan
- Release: March 22, 2024

The Decagon House Murders (Japanese: 十角館の殺人, Hepburn: Jūkakukan no satsujin) is a 2024 Japanese mystery series based on the novel of the same name written by Yukito Ayatsuji. It debuted on March 22, 2024.

== Plot ==
Seven university students who are part of a mystery club decide to spend a week-long vacation on Tsunojima Island, located off the coast of Japan. The island was the site of a brutal unsolved murder six months earlier, where the owner and his family were killed. Shortly after arriving, they begin to suspect that one of their group members is plotting to kill them.

== Cast ==
- Tomoya Oku as Konan Takaaki
- Munetaka Aoki as Shimada Kiyoshi
- Ayumu Mochizuki as Ellery
- Rukiya as Carr
- Yuki Imai as Leroux
- Kosuke Suzuki as Poe
- Nagahama Neru as Agatha
- Reia Yonekura as Orcy
- Hiroto Kobayashi as Van
- Nakamura Toru as Nakamura Seiji

== Production ==
In December 2023 was announced that Hulu Japan was producing a live action adaptation of the novel The Decagon House Murders. Akira Uchikata is set to direct the adaptation, while the script will be written by Hiroyuki Yatsu, Madoka Hayano, and Kaori Fujii.

In March 2024, Hulu Japan released a teaser trailer revealing the cast of the series. The new members include Ayumu Mochizuki, Neru Nagahama, Yuki Imai, Kosuke Suzuki, Hiroto Kobayashi, Reia Yonekura, Rukiya, and Kazu Kikuchi.
