= Inu × Boku SS =

Japanese manga series

- Manga volume 1 cover

妖狐×僕SS (Inu Boku Shīkuretto Sābisu)
- Genre: Romantic comedy; Supernatural
- Manga
- Written by: Cocoa Fujiwara
- Published by: Square Enix
- English publisher: NA: Yen Press
- Magazine: Gangan Joker
- Original run: April 22, 2009 – February 22, 2014
- Volumes: 11
- Anime television series
- Directed by: Naokatsu Tsuda
- Produced by: Shunsuke Saitō; Yasutaka Kimura; Kōji Kajita; Toshihiro Maeda; Kozue Kaneniwa; Makoto Furukawa
- Written by: Toshizo Nemoto
- Music by: Kōtarō Nakagawa
- Studio: David Production
- Licensed by: AUS: Hanabee; NA: Sentai Filmworks; UK: MVM Films
- Original network: MBS, TBS, RKB, CBC, BS-TBS
- English network: US: Anime Network
- Original run: January 12, 2012 – March 29, 2012
- Episodes: 12 + OVA
- icon

Inu × Boku SS (Japanese: 妖狐×僕SS, Hepburn: Inu Boku Shīkuretto Sābisu; lit. 'The Dog and Me Secret Service'), also known as Youko × Boku, is a Japanese manga series written and illustrated by Cocoa Fujiwara. It was serialied in Square Enix's Gangan Joker magazine from April 2009 to February 2014, with its chapters collected in eleven tankōbon volumes. An anime television series adaptation by David Production aired in Japan between January and March 2012. The anime has been licensed by Sentai Filmworks for streaming, and home video release in North America.

== Plot ==
=== Part One: "Prologue" ===
Known on the outside as merely a daughter of a rich aristocratic family, 15-year-old Ririchiyo Shirakiin is far from normal – she is an Atavist, a human with demon or yōkai ancestors with the ability to channel their supernatural powers. Wrought with insecurities about her birth and family, Ririchiyo protects her inner, most sensitive self through a sharp tongue, eventually leaving to move into the Maison de Ayakashi (メゾン・ド・章樫, Mezon do Ayakashi), better known as Ayakashi Hall or Ayakashikan (妖館), a high-security apartment complex where fellow Atavists reside. As Atavists are neither fully human nor supernatural, they tend to attract fully-grown, often dangerous demons, and so group together, each resident guarded by their own Secret Service (SS) bodyguard. Despite not requesting for a bodyguard, she finds herself served by Sōshi Miketsukami, the descendant of a nine-tailed fox who devotes his life to her. Although initially unwilling to accept him as her bodyguard, the two grow close and Miketsukami helps Ririchiyo suppress her bad habit as well as establish valuable connections with the residents at Ayakashi Hall; Ririchiyo also inevitably helps him become more emotional and to be more perceptive of the world, which he had not acquired due to his house arrest and isolation. The two eventually fall in love and begin a relationship. Instead of fulfilling her initial goal to be alone, Ririchiyo realises that she has instead surrounded herself with supportive friends. As a bonding activity, the residents decide to build a time capsule together for their future selves.

Unfortunately, this sudden peace is interrupted when Karuta Roromiya, Kagerō Shoukiin's SS, is attacked and heavily wounded by a fellow Atavist named Mikoto Inugami. Inugami declares his intention to recruit members for the Night Parade of One Hundred Demons, an army of Atavists that have lost their human sanity and become senseless yōkai subject to his command. Despite attempts to save Karuta, she eventually loses herself and becomes a part of the army, attacking her friends. Miketsukami is killed by Inugami in front of Ririchiyo while trying to protect her.

=== Part Two: "If" ===
Nearly every one of the residents of Ayakashi Hall is revealed to have been killed as a result of the incident, except for Renshō Sorinozuka. 23 years have passed since then, and the deceased have reincarnated thanks to their yōkai blood. 15-year-old Ririchiyo, wrought with insecurities about her sharp tongue, leaves her home and moves into the apartment complex hoping to be alone, only to meet Miketsukami who employs himself as her SS. Unlike other residents, Ririchiyo has no recollection of her past due to her previous incarnation's trauma over Miketsukami's death, but slowly starts to remember after encounters with the others. Ririchiyo deduces that the Miketsukami now actually has no memories as well, and is merely acting out of an ingrained emotion, choosing to break off their contract and relationship as she confirms that she loved him in her previous life, not her current life. Years of calm is once again interrupted by news about the Night Parade, signalling that it has become an unstoppable cycle. As everyone works to stop it, Banri Watanuki, who has reincarnated as a middle-schooler, befriends Inugami, not realising who he is. The residents eventually discover that Inugami is constantly revisiting a time from 23 years ago using a special sacred tree, known as the Millenium Cherry Blossom Tree, and decide to send a time capsule containing letters for their past selves.

=== "Interlude" ===
Five short stories, each focusing on one or more of the main characters. Set sometime during Part 1.

=== Part Three: "Awaken in Spring" ===
The setting jumps back to 23 years ago, in the first timeline, where the group are about to bury the time capsule containing letters to their future reincarnations as a bonding activity. As they dig a hole for the box, they find another box in its place containing letters from their future selves to them, warning them about Inugami's plans. With this timeline now deviating from its original course, Ririchiyo and Miketsukami have yet to cement their relationship, and she instead chooses to keep her distance from him after learning that he will die protecting her. The group manages to prevent the attack on Karuta, but are forced to return to their own homes, knowing that Ayakashi Hall is no longer safe. Back in his loveless home, Miketsukami is held in captivity again until Ririchiyo arrives to save him. The two finally reconnect and begin a relationship.

Reuniting, the residents learn that Inugami is acquainted with Shimon Satorigahara, an elderly Atavist who is revered as the leader of the Atavist community for her power to perceive the thoughts and memories of others by touching them. Because simply going out could mean an overload of information and subsequent death for her, Shimon was locked up at home since a young age, having to live vicariously through Inugami. As children, they had grown close, with Shimon trusting him enough to show him the Satorigahara family's Millenium Cherry Blossom Tree, a yōkai known as Sennenzakura that governs time. An accident however, caused Inugami to become immortal, and from then on his existence began to revolve around hunting and gifting Shimon the corpses of all Atavists, for her to read their stories and memories for enjoyment eternally. In the final battle, Kagerō manages to gather Atavists from all over the country to fight Inugami's army and a final showdown is held in the Satorigahara residence. Inugami is deterred by Watanuki's presence, whom he unconsciously considered as a friend, and killed by Miketsukami, ending the Night Parade and lifting his curse, causing all senseless yōkai to return to their Atavist form. As Shimon reads a dying Inugami's memories, she realises that he had loved her all along, amidst her hundreds of reincarnations. In an aftermath, the residents and their SS bodyguards continue towards a new life together, with everyone alive and well. Zange Natsume, who can See snippets of the future, pictures a scene where those from the "If" world are living happily together in a different timeline.

== Characters ==
Ririchiyo Shirakiin (白鬼院 凜々蝶, Shirakiin Ririchiyo)
Voiced by: Rina Hidaka (Japanese); Hilary Haag (English)

Part One
Room 4 tenant. She is 15 years old at the beginning of the story.
Ririchiyo is a young girl with long black hair and purple eyes, who is the descendant of an Oni. She leaves her home and moves into Maison de Ayakashi in order to live alone. She yearns to be independent and constantly worries about not being able to communicate with other people properly, due to her habit of rudely slighting people whenever they try to interact with her. As the daughter of a well-known and well-respected family, she felt she was only recognised for her family and not for herself; she was bullied by her peers and protected by her teachers and other adults who wished to be seen well by her family. This caused her to develop her bad habit and also incentivized her to move out. Her SS agent and servant is Sōshi Miketsukami, who has the blood of a fox-spirit. While at first she is exasperated by Sōshi's extreme willingness to serve her and is reluctant to accept him as her SS, the two grow close and eventually fall in love, beginning a relationship. She dies at the age of 16 after Sōshi's death, while fighting Mikoto and his army.
Part Two (23 years later)
A 15-year-old girl who moves into Room 1 of Maison de Ayakashi. Initially she has no memories of her past life due to the trauma of losing Sōshi. Unlike in Part One, she does not seem to be the victim of direct bullying, however she starts to distance herself from others when she learns that her peers were only friendly to her because they had to be.
After an encounter with the aged Renshō, she recovers some of her memories, but they are suppressed by Sōshi. Kagerō's words causes her to remember everything, and her regret and her strong emotion of wanting to "go back" to their past are used by a yōkai called Sodehiki Mujina and she gets trapped along with Renshō in an ideal world that they created. Following this event, she decides to end her contract and relationship with Sōshi in order to sort out her feelings. Although struggling to come to terms with her past and current life, she resolves to uncover the truth about the "Night Parade of 100 Demons".
Toward the end she learns that like her, Sōshi also has aspects that haven't changed, and tells him that although she loves the Sōshi from her previous life, she still considers the Sōshi from her current life an important figure and that she still cares for him. While fighting Kuroe Karasuma, who loses her human self after being defeated by Mikoto, Ririchiyo is severely wounded and nearly dies. She gets Sōshi to scribe her letter to the past because of this.
Part Three
After receiving letters from the "if" world (where the "Night Parade of 100 Demons" took place) and Zange tells her what he saw in that future, Ririchiyo resolves to prevent the Night Parade from occurring. Due to the appearance of the time capsule from the future, the events following the burial of the time capsule do not occur and so she is not in a relationship with Sōshi. Rather, upon learning that Sōshi had died protecting Ririchiyo, she starts to distance herself from him.
The residents are notified on New Years that the "Night Parade of 100 Demons" has started, and Ririchiyo is taken back home by her father. However, realising how important her days at Maison de Ayakashi with the other residents were, she becomes determined to return to Ayakashi Hall, despite her father's disagreement. Later she breaks into the Miketsukami house in order to rescue Sōshi (who was held captive there) and reconciles with him, asking him to tell her more about himself.
Ririchiyo seems to be physically weak throughout and has asthma to varying degrees of severity. Apparently, she is the weakest at arm wrestling out of the main female cast.

Sōshi Miketsukami (御狐神 双熾, Miketsukami Sōshi)
Voiced by: Yuichi Nakamura (Japanese); Chris Patton (English)
The assigned SS Agent to Ririchiyo and, in his own words, her servant and "Dog". Sōshi is descended from the evil nine-tailed fox who was Sōshi's past life. Ririchiyo helped him when she was little, although she is initially unaware of it. Later on in the series, it is revealed that his family had kept him under house arrest because they feared the powers of the kitsune, and in order to obtain freedom he learned to manipulate and appeal to others through obeying their whims. However, because of this, he was unable to form his own personality. It was not until he started corresponding with Ririchiyo through letters, under the guise of her fiance Kagerō, that he realized that he was in fact, capable of having emotion, and he began growing into his own person. He is calm, polite, and gentle to everyone he interacts with, but he bears particularly strong devotion to his Ririchiyo, blindly obeying her and protecting her with his life if the situation calls for it. He enters a relationship with her after she confesses her love for him, which was prompted by him reading a letter that detailed her feelings for him that she meant to put into a time capsule, but instead sent to him by mistake. What he wishes for is a family, which he never had. A notable feature is his heterochromia, in which his right eye is blue, while the other is dark gold.
He was killed in action at the end of Part 1 at age 23, protecting Ririchiyo from a band of evil yōkai. He is reincarnated but does not remember his previous life. After learning from Kagerō's mother how important Ririchiyo was for the previous Sōshi, he researches about her and becomes Ririchiyo's SS agent. After Ririchiyo regains her memories, she breaks her contract with him, in an attempt to protect him and also because she realizes he is not the same Sōshi she fell in love with.
Depressed because of how Ririchiyo break the contract with him, Sōshi is sulking in his room and still in contact with other SS agents such as Zange Natsume for a photo of Ririchiyo and other things. Because of his hatred, envy and jealousy towards his previous self because Ririchiyo loved and loves the previous him, Sōshi even tried to search for the time capsule his previous self left and destroyed it. Not having any memories from his previous life, he said and planned to destroy the thing the previous Sōshi left, which is a memory card. The memory card revealed to be full of Ririchiyo's photos and letter from his childhood.
Sōshi, even though after cutting off his ties with Ririchiyo as her SS Agent, come to Ririchiyo's rescue from the manipulated servant that is being controlled by the leader of the previous war. Before getting killed, Ririchiyo stepped in front of him and protected him, he remains besides Ririchiyo after being saved from dying. Because Ririchiyo said that even though she loves the previous him, he is also a special person to her and that she is glad that he was born in this world. Sōshi said those words alone is enough and in return he'll help her write a letter for the time capsule which they will send to the past for preventing their death.
Renshō Sorinozuka (反ノ塚 連勝, Sorinozuka Renshō)
Voiced by: Yoshimasa Hosoya (Japanese); David Wald (English)
An Ittan-momen descendant with a water lily inspired tattoo across his tanned skin, he is the tenant of Room 3. He has known Ririchiyo since they were children and acts like an older brother, keeping her company, as Ririchiyo tended to be isolated due to her attitude and family status. He also earns Sōshi's trust because of this. His SS Agent is Nobara, who, despite their bickering, he has a close relationship with. He is lazy. He is fairly popular to girls but according to him, the relationship is always ended by the girl.
He was the only one of the Maison de Ayakashi members who survived the Night Parade of 100 Demons, and as such, he has aged normally, and is 41 years old in Part 2. He was waiting for the others to reincarnate for these past 23 years, and he has become jaded as a result of living on while the others had to be reborn. In Part 2, he lives with the middle school reincarnation of Nobara, and laments her small breasts.
He still cares for Ririchiyo for these past year, and supports Ririchiyo after she loses her memories. When Ririchiyo is stuck in her recovery of getting her memories back, he is the one who triggers Ririchiyo's memories to return.
Nobara Yukinokōji (雪小路 野ばら, Yukinokōji Nobara)
Voiced by: Yōko Hikasa (Japanese); Shelley Calene-Black (English)
The SS Agent assigned to Renshō. She is descended from a Yuki-onna and wears glasses in her human form. She is interested in fashion and cute girls, often sexually fantasizing over them. She shouts the catchphrase "Maniac!" whenever she sees something she finds to be arousing. She often acts like a big sister to both Karuta and Ririchiyo as well as Chino. She states she has no interest in men and ignores or often treats her protectorate Renshō poorly, she is and can be surprisingly caring for him.
She was killed at the age of 22 by an enemy band of yōkai. She was reincarnated, and is currently a middle school student living with Renshō. When Sōshi no longer have any ties with Ririchiyo as SS Agent, she offered herself to be the replacement of Sōshi as SS Agent for Ririchiyo. She intended to return to the past but stopped by Renshō. She recalls memories of her past life and has the same personality.
Kagerō Shōkiin (青鬼院 蜻蛉, Shōkiin Kagerō)
Voiced by: Tomokazu Sugita (Japanese); David Matranga (English)
Tenant of Room 2, and a half-oni like Ririchiyo. He is Sōshi's former master, Banri and Natsume's childhood friend, and Ririchiyo's fiancée. Kagerō is eccentric, straightforward, and a narcissist, often calling the other tenants "pigs" or "animals". His SS agent is Karuta, who is made to wear a maid outfit and a chain around her neck when he is around. He compulsively classes people in two different categories—"Sadist" or "Masochist". Ririchiyo used to write him letters when she was young, however, the letters' responses were in fact written by Sōshi. Despite his outrageous, egotistical personality, he has shown the ability to be surprisingly perceptive, and at times even sensitive, towards others.
He died and reincarnated along with the others. Now, he is 20 years old and currently living in Maison de Ayakashi in Room 2. When trying to stop the current Sōshi, Kagerō's mask got cracked. His face that he hid, is proven to be handsome and charming. Despite how he act, Kagerō cared for Ririchiyo even now. He is the one who makes Ririchiyo accept Sōshi's death. In the last chapter, he intended to be the one who go back to the past and even saying his farewells, but stopped by Karuta who said that she does not want him to become a lonely person. He becomes gentler than before, and even said that had he realizes what's important to him maybe things will go differently between Ririchiyo and him.
Karuta Roromiya (髏々宮 カルタ, Roromiya Karuta)
Voiced by: Kana Hanazawa (Japanese); Monica Rial (English)
The assigned SS Agent to Kagerō, a Gashadokuro (large skeleton made from the bones of people who died from starvation) whose human form depicts her as a light brown haired (reddish pink in the anime) teenage girl. Though she appears to be "zoned out" most of the time, she is actually clever, observant, and likes eating. Karuta shows special feelings for Watanuki, who is her childhood friend.
Near the end of Part 1, she was attacked and possessed by enemy yōkai who began to use her for their own purposes. She asked Watanuki to kill her, as she could never return to human form. Watanuki yelled at her and told her that he would still be by her side, no matter if she could not return to human form. Although she was so happy to hear those sentiments, she was completely taken over by the enemy and was forced to be killed sometime after the raid.
In Part 2, she has been reincarnated, and is currently 20 years old, the oldest of the reincarnated female main characters. She now has short hair, and her breasts are bigger than in her previous life. She cried for Kagerō and stopped him from going back to the past alone. She cares for Ririchiyo and still wants to be her friend.
Banri Watanuki (渡狸 卍里, Watanuki Banri)
Voiced by: Takuya Eguchi (Japanese); Greg Ayres (English)
Tenant of Room 1, Banri is a mixed blood tanuki demon with an impulsive streak and is outspoken. Labeling himself a "delinquent", he considers Sōshi as his rival because he once called him cute, causing Banri to resent him. His SS agent is Zange. He has strong feelings for Karuta Roromiya, who was the reason he decided he wanted to become strong. He deeply hates and is afraid of Kagerō because he was bullied by him as kids and the way he treats Karuta.
Near the end of Part 1, he tries to convince a possessed Karuta that he will be by her side, even if she cannot revert to her human form. Although she cries in happiness, she is unable to override the enemy's control, and Karuta as a person is completely erased. He chased after her, but was killed in the battle between the Maison de Ayakashi and the enemy yōkai at age 16. He has been reincarnated in Part 2 as a middle school student, but has no memories of Part 1, much like Ririchiyo and Sōshi. His SS is Karuta in Part 2, and he is now the youngest of all the residents.
Not realizing it, Watanuki has become friend with the leader of yokai's raid, Mikoto, the previous group who started the war in Maison de Ayakashi, who killed Ririchiyo and the others 23 years ago. When Mikoto went to the past with the plan of re-doing the raid once again, and when everyone from Maison de Ayakashi are arguing about who should go to the past, he suggests a plan of sending a letter with a time capsule to the past, which arrived safely.
Zange Natsume (夏目 残夏, Natsume Zange)
Voiced by: Mamoru Miyano (Japanese); Blake Shepard (English)
The assigned SS agent to Banri, Natsume is a half-human, half-demon wearing a set of black rabbit ears on his head. His ancestor was a Hyakume, or 100 eyes monster, capable of "seeing" the past, future, and various other things. He claims to be able to "see" such things as well because of this heritage. His powers also come in handy when looking for information, although it seems to adversely affect his health. Despite a somewhat frail disposition, he is cheerful. He is best friends with Kagerō and has known him, as well as Sōshi and Banri, since childhood. He is fond of Sōshi, and likes to flirt with him and call him "Sou-tan" because of this. Natsume is something of a meddlesome busybody, as he likes to stick his nose into the business of his peers and occasionally seems sinister and suspicious. That being said, his motives usually have positive goals, such as allowing his friends to realize things about themselves or their relationships. His motto is "everyone should get along."
Natsume died of illness at age 24, two years after Sōshi was killed in the enemy yōkai's raid. He was reincarnated, and is currently 21. After Ririchiyo breaks her contract with Sōshi, Natsume is still in contact with him such as for exchanging photos of Ririchiyo and other information. He once tried to stop Sōshi from searching the time capsule with Kagerō. He suggests that he should be the one who goes back to the past because no matter how many times he is reincarnated, he will always remember his previous life which makes him almost like an immortal. But that suggestion is no longer significant because the letter which they had sent to the past will prevent their previous death and also the yōkai's raid, which will make their current self disappear.
Chino Kotomura (小人村 ちの, Kotomura Chino)
Voiced by: Aki Toyosaki (Japanese); Brittney Karbowski (English)
Chino Kotomura is a cheerful maid who works at the Maison de Ayakashi. She is always happy and she likes her work. She is a koropokkuru, which means that her yokai form is really small, which helps her to clean really narrow places. She died eventually and reincarnated sometime during the timeskip. She is the same age as Ririchiyo (therefore her classmate) and an official resident of the Ayakashikan with her own secret service bodyguard (who does not show himself in public).
Kotarō Kawasumi (河住 小太郎, Kawasumi Kotarō)
Voiced by: Minami Tsuda (Japanese); Beth Lazarou (English)
Son of Joutarou Kawasumi, his father is the cook at the cafeteria of Ayakashikan. He is the one who discovers the time capsule sent by the future reincarnations of the main characters.
Ayumu Warashibe (童辺 あゆむ, Warashibe Ayumu)
Voiced by: Takahiro Mizushima (Japanese); Illich Guardiola (English)
A 'cross-dressing' maid at Ayakashikan. His yokai form is an zashiki warashi. He also dies and reincarnates sometime during the time skip and appears as a long curly haired 'cross-dressing' maid.
Yūjirō Kōda (幸蛇 優二朗, Kōda Yūjirō)
Voiced by: Yasunori Masutani (Japanese); Mark Laskowski (English)
The third maid in Ayakashikan. He became a male maid because he was fired at his previous job and simply needed the money because of the recession. His yokai form is an orochi.
Jōtarō Kawasumi (河住 丈太郎, Kawasumi Jōtarō)
Voiced by: Katsuki Murase (Japanese); Rob Mungle (English)
The father of Kotarō Kawasumi. He is the cook of the cafeteria in Ayakashikan who simply serves breakfast and dinner for the inhabitants, but likes to pretend he is a bartender preparing fancy cocktails.
Ayane Shōkiin (青鬼院 菖蒲, Shōkiin Ayane)
Voiced by: Emi Shinohara (Japanese); Shannon Emerick (English)
The mother of Kagerō Shokiin.
Hana Kawasumi (河住 花, Kawasumi Hana)
Voiced by: Yui Ogura (Japanese); Wendy Martin (English)
The daughter of Jōtarō Kawasumi and the little sister of Kotarō Kawasumi.

== Media ==
=== Manga ===
Inu × Boku SS was written and illustrated by Cocoa Fujiwara. It was serialized in Square Enix's Gangan Joker magazine between April 22, 2009, and February 22, 2014. Square Enix published 11 tankōbon volumes between April 22, 2010, and July 22, 2014. Yen Press licensed the manga and published the series in North America from October 2013 to May 2016.

==== Volumes ====
No.	Original release date	Original ISBN	English release date	English ISBN
1	April 22, 2010	978-4-7575-2851-2	October 29, 2013	978-0-316-24313-1
2	April 22, 2010	978-4-7575-2852-9	January 21, 2014	978-0-316-32207-2
3	July 22, 2010	978-4-7575-2940-3	April 22, 2014	978-0-316-32209-6
4	February 22, 2011	978-4-7575-3146-8	July 22, 2014	978-0-316-32208-9
5	July 22, 2011	978-4-7575-3290-8	October 28, 2014	978-0-316-32210-2
6	December 22, 2011	978-4-7575-3448-3	January 20, 2015	978-0-316-32213-3
7	June 22, 2012	978-4-7575-3630-2	April 21, 2015	978-0-316-32215-7
8	November 22, 2012	978-4-7575-3794-1	July 21, 2015	978-0-316-32217-1
9	May 22, 2013	978-4-7575-3970-9	November 17, 2015	978-0-316-35211-6
10	October 22, 2013	978-4-7575-4092-7	February 23, 2016	978-0-316-26911-7
11	July 22, 2014	978-4-7575-4359-1	May 24, 2016	978-0-316-39330-0

=== Anime ===
A 12-episode anime adaptation by David Production aired in Japan between January 12 and March 29, 2012, and was simulcast on Crunchyroll. An original video animation episode was released with the seventh Blu-ray Disc volume on September 26, 2012. The series has been licensed in North America by Sentai Filmworks. Hanabee Entertainment licensed the anime in Australia and New Zealand and released the series on Blu-ray and DVD in April 2013. MVM Films have licensed the series in the United Kingdom.

==== Music ====
Opening Theme
"Nirvana" (ニルヴァーナ, Niruvāna) by Mucc
Ending Themes
1. "Rakuen no Photograph" (楽園のPhotograph) by Yuichi Nakamura
2. "Kimi wa" (君は) by Rina Hidaka
3. "One Way" by Takuya Eguchi and Mamoru Miyano
4. "SM Hantei Forum" (SM判定フォーラム, Esuemu Hantei Fōramu) by Tomokazu Sugita
5. "Sweets Parade" by Kana Hanazawa
6. "Taiyō to Tsuki" (太陽と月) by Yoshimasa Hosoya and Yōko Hikasa

==== Episodes ====
No.	Title	Original release date
1	"The Dog and Me"; Transliteration: "Inu to Boku" (Japanese: いぬとぼく)	January 12, 2012
Ririchiyo Shirakiin, a girl from a rich family, moves into the high-security Maison de Ayakashi apartment complex, where she finds herself assigned a Secret Service agent named Sōshi Miketsukami. Ririchiyo is reluctant to have Sōshi as her Secret Service, particularly as she does not feel worth protecting as her family household has taken up much of her being. One night, a burglar breaks into the complex to try and rob Ririchiyo, only to learn that Sōshi, along with the other Secret Service agents in the complex, have the power to channel the spirits of monsters. Having been protected from a gunshot by him, Ririchiyo accepts Sōshi as her bodyguard.
2	"A Lonely Dog"; Transliteration: "Samishigariya no Inu" (Japanese: 淋しがり屋の犬)	January 19, 2012
Renshō Sorinozuka tags along with Ririchiyo and Sōshi at a shopping mall till evening. Sōshi tells Ririchiyo that they have met each other in the past, but she does not recall of this. As the three return to the complex, they learn from Nobara Yukinokōji that Karuta Roromiya has gone missing. As they set out to find her, Ririchiyo finds herself trapped inside a dark spirit called a nurikabe. With much effort, Sōshi and Ririchiyo slash through the barrier using their enhanced abilities. It turns out that Karuta had left earlier to help prepare a welcome party for Ririchiyo and Sōshi.
3	"The Real Contract"; Transliteration: "Hontō no Keiyaku" (Japanese: ほんとうの契約)	January 26, 2012
Ririchiyo enters high school, having to deal with the stress of making a good impression. She later notices Sōshi kissing an admirer, but he denies ever having a relationship with the admirer. After questioning him about it, her emotions get the best of her, to the point of her terminating their contract together. The following day, Nobara offers Ririchiyo to contract with her, but the latter turns her down. During a school banquet, after two male students make fun of Ririchiyo for her hostility, Sōshi defends her true personality as being kindhearted. After she realizes how much he cares for her, Ririchiyo asks Sōshi to be her bodyguard again.
4	"Ayakashi Hall Walk Rally"; Transliteration: "Ayakashi-kan Wōkurarī" (Japanese: 妖館ウォークラリー)	February 2, 2012
Banri Watanuki, a former resident of the complex, has returned from training with Zange Natsume, his Secret Service agent. Sōshi has known Watanuki and Natsume since childhood, which makes this seem awkward to Ririchiyo. The four participate in a walk rally to obtain signatures from all the residents. After Ririchiyo and Sōshi finds Karuta, Natsume reveals that Watanuki had originally gone off to train in order to protect the girl he loves. Ririchiyo seems deep in thought after she begins to have an irregular heartbeat.
5	"Kagerō (Dragonfly) of the Spring"; Transliteration: "Haru no Kagerō" (Japanese: 春の蜻蛉)	February 9, 2012
Ririchiyo wants to write a letter of apology to Sōshi, but she hesitates trying to find the right notepad to write on. Ririchiyo has been getting disturbing text messages from a block number, shrugging them off until they become more frequent and threatening. While Ririchiyo is walking back from the store alone at night, Sōshi finds her and expresses his worry for her. Soon after, Kagerō Shōkiin, the one responsible for sending the text messages, appears out of the blue. As he is also a childhood friend of most of the other male residents, Kagerō gives all the tenants and agents various "bondage items" as gifts. He also mentions that Sōshi had formerly served under him, catching Ririchyo off guard. After he then claims to be engaged to Ririchiyo, she remembers exchanging letters with him when she was young.
6	"Don't Think"; Transliteration: "Kangaeru yori mo" (Japanese: 考えるよりも)	February 16, 2012
Karuta spends a lot of her time in her own world in high school, much to Ririchiyo's concern. Watanuki says that not many people truly understand what goes on in Karuta's mind. Natsume wants Ririchiyo to bond with Karuta, although she has no idea how to do so. Since Ririchiyo offered Karuta some of her lunch, Karuta repays her by giving her several treats during suppertime. The next day, Ririchiyo is amazed at Karuta's cooking skills during home economics class, and she begins to understand what Karuta is going through. A downpour occurs after school, and a nure-onna enters the building. Ririchiyo takes it down after Watanuki fails to defeat it. However, the nure-onna revives and sends Ririchiyo and Watanuki out the window. Luckily, Karuta arrives and saves them both from falling.
7	"Their Night Alone"; Transliteration: "Futari no Yoru" (Japanese: ふたりのよる)	February 23, 2012
A flock of ghosts have invaded the mansion and security measures have been activated. The residents are locked in various places of the mansion and are to stay there until morning. In her room, this is the perfect time for Ririchiyo to express her feelings for Sōshi, but this proves difficult for her. In the hallway, Natsume encourages Watanuki to use this time to train all night. In the cafeteria, Sorinozuka rests while Nobara plays shogi with Chino Kotomura, one of the maids. In the kitchen, Karuta becomes so hungry that she starts to cook a full-course meal. Sōshi stays up all night while Ririchiyo tries to go to sleep. But before doing so, she thanks him for his service thus far. Watanuki accidentally breaks the barrier, allowing the ghosts, known as the obariyon, to pass through. As it seems that the obariyon are wiped out, a few more come out and jump on Ririchiyo's back. Sōshi, who cannot bear the sight of this, destroys the rest of them.
8	"Tea and Distance"; Transliteration: "Ocha to Kyori" (Japanese: お茶と距離)	March 1, 2012
Ririchiyo wants the type of friendship with Sōshi the tenants share with their agents. She is unable to speak her true feelings, not to mention that she does not know much about his background. She observes how Karuta and Watanuki interact with each other while at school, hoping to understand this for herself. She plans to make coffee and sit down with Sōshi, but she first comes up with ideas to invite him to drink coffee with her, all to no avail. After many desperate attempts to ask him, she calls for him under a cherry blossom, where she finally says that they should treat each other as friends, inviting him to have coffee in her room the following evening.
9	"Day of the Promise"; Transliteration: "Yakusoku no Hi" (Japanese: 約束の日)	March 8, 2012
Ririchiyo frets over her upcoming coffee date with Sōshi. In the afternoon, Ririchiyo cleans up her room, then decides to study with Karuta and Watanuki for an upcoming quiz in their class while the agents monitor them. Natsume creates a series of "partner games" for everyone, guessing what is inside the mystery box and taking a partner quiz, yet Sōshi gets carried away with both of these. A series of commands have appeared in the mansion causing a stir. Kagerō was behind this.
10	"The Unfaithful Demon Fox"; Transliteration: "Uragiri no Yōko" (Japanese: 裏切りの妖狐)	March 15, 2012
The coffee date is cancelled due to Kagerō's unexpected return, so she reschedules it for the next day. However, after school the next day, Kagerō drags Ririchiyo with him to several dating spots all over town, making matters worse. Later than night, Ririchiyo grows anxious by Sōshi not responding to her apology text, so she decides to visit his room and offer him a melon to apologize. When she does apologize, Sōshi acts out of character, causing her to get flustered and return to her room in distress. The next morning, Sōshi begs Kagerō to not tell Ririchiyo his secret, but Kagerō denies, leading to an intensive battle between the two. Ririchiyo later finds the two and stops them from fighting, asking them to explain what the problem is. It is then that Sōshi admits he is hiding something from Ririchiyo.
11	"Kagerō"; Transliteration: "Kagerō" (Japanese: 陽炎)	March 22, 2012
Since his family name was known to be born from an evil bloodline, Sōshi was secluded inside a shrine as a child. A year later at a party, a woman allows him to work for her in her house, where he is to serve a young Kagerō for a living. It is revealed that Kagerō told Sōshi to respond to the letters sent from his fiancée, to which Sōshi believed her to be perceptive. When Kagerō showed Sōshi who his fiancée was, that being Ririchiyo, Sōshi was surprised to see a spoiled rich girl write letters so keenly. During the summer, they continued writing letters to each other, and Sōshi realized his feelings for Ririchiyo, but he started to feel guilty for faking Kagerō's personality. After hearing that Ririchiyo moved inside the Maison de Ayakashi, that is when he decided to become a Secret Service agent. Ririchiyo already knows that Kagerō was not the one who responded to her letters, but she is shocked to find out that Sōshi was actually the one who did, which confirmed how Sōshi knew so much about her in the first place.
12	"The Day We Came Together"; Transliteration: "Futari ni natta Hi" (Japanese: 二人になった日)	March 29, 2012
Kotarō Kawasumi, the son of the chef, has a conversation with Sorinozuka about his worries on what might happen when his father Jōtarō Kawasumi reincarnates, but then Natsume suddenly suggests to send a message inside a time capsule buried in the garden for the future reincarnation to read. Natsume convinces the others to join in writing letters to their future selves. Ririchiyo recounts how much she has changed since she has lived inside the apartment complex. While Kotarō thinks of what to write, he is comforted by his father, who states he and his future self are two separate beings. Ririchiyo accidentally switched a letter written to Sōshi that was meant for her future self, which stated that she will not run away and will stay by his side. She runs away to a park, and, after Sōshi calls her to come and get her, Ririchiyo realizes Sōshi hates himself like she was before, but she was able to overcome the ordeal because she fell in love with Sōshi. Knowing she has hurt others to protect herself, she decided to use her courage to save him by confessing her love to him. Sōshi embraces Ririchiyo and expresses his love for her as well. Sōshi dreams of having a family with her, but Ririchiyo replies that only time will tell if it is meant to happen.
OVA	"Miketsukami-kun's Transformations"; Transliteration: "Miketsukami-kun Henka / Suitchi / Omamagoto" (Japanese: 「御狐神くん変化」「スイッチ」「おままごと」)	September 26, 2012
Noticing Ririchiyo's nervousness, Sōshi tries to ease her by transforming into a young boy and then into a woman. Later, Natsume plays around with Sorinozuka various 'switches' which encourages Karuta to try to find other people's 'switches'. Afterwards, Kotarō's younger sister Hana Kawasumi comes to the mansion and decides to play house with the tenants, which takes many bizarre turns.
