= Teen Regime =

- 17才の帝国
- Genre: Science fiction; political; youth
- Written by: Reiko Yoshida
- Directed by: Takegoro Nishimura; Tomohiro Kuwano
- Starring: Fūju Kamio; Anna Yamada; Yuumi Kawai; Ayumu Mochizuki; Marika Matsumoto; Akira Emoto; Shota Sometani; Tetta Sugimoto; Naomi Nishida; Ryō Iwamatsu; Min Tanaka; Gen Hoshino
- Voices of: Megumi Ogata; Moeka Shiotsuka
- Opening theme: Teen Regime - Main Title Theme
- Ending theme: Yuta Bandoh feat. Moeka Shiotsuka "Koeyo"
- Composers: Yuta Bandoh; Tomggg; Ryō Maekubo; Shohei Amimori
- Country of origin: Japan
- Original language: Japanese
- No. of episodes: 5

Production
- Producers: Kei Kurube; Ayumi Sano

Original release
- Network: NHK
- Release: May 7 – June 4, 2022

Teen Regime (Japanese: 17才の帝国, Hepburn: Jūnanasai no Teikoku; lit. '17-year-old's Empire') is a 2022 Japanese science-fiction mini-series written by Reiko Yoshida. Set in 202X where Japan's economy has failed, it stars Fūju Kamio as Aran Maki, the 17-year-old Prime Minister of an experimental city governed by young leaders and artificial intelligence as part of Project Utopi-AI. It aired on NHK on Saturdays from May 7 to June 4, 2022.

== Synopsis ==
In 202X, Prime Minister Tsuguaki Washida aims to develop human resources for Japan, ridiculed as "Sunset Japan" after the collapse of its economy due to the aging population and rising unemployment rate. He orders Kiyoshi Taira to plan a local city governed by young leaders using artificial intelligence. Aonami bids to be the experimental city, and political AI Solon selects four young people as cabinet ministers, including Aran Maki, the 17-year-old Prime Minister.

== Cast ==
=== Main ===
- Fūju Kamio as Aran Maki (真木亜蘭)

Haru as young Maki; Ō Aoki as 10-year-old Maki
17-year-old high school student chosen by Solon as the Prime Minister of experimental city Ūa. He was raised by a single mother and, after his mother died, his grandmother, whom he had to take care of. After his grandmother died, he learned to program, and also participated in an online forum for high schoolers to discuss politics. This upbringing influenced him to become a politician, though the death of his friend Yuki Shirai, the victim of the cover-up of illegal donations, was a great influence. After his AI Snow goes rogue, he was dismissed as prime minister, though he later participates in the revived lantern festival through the metaverse while studying abroad. Kamio said that Maki is mysterious, and that "at first glance looks like he's not a high school student, but he sometimes acts like [one], and it's a role hard to grasp."

- Anna Yamada as Sachi Sagawa (茶川サチ)

17-year-old high school student who becomes the Prime Minister's Aide. After meeting Maki through the forum, she earnestly prayed for him to become prime minister, as she had been rejected from the program. She thought she caught Maki's attention after making a presentation on a goodwill point system in the forum, but it is later revealed that it was because of her resemblance to Yuki, who died at 17. She moves to Ūa with her family after becoming his Aide and continues to live there after Maki's dismissal.

- Gen Hoshino as Kiyoshi Taira (平清志)

Deputy Chief Cabinet Secretary, a politician called "the next generation prime minister candidate". He is the project manager of Utopi-AI but was rejected as a cabinet minister. In the Washida cabinet, dominated by elderly politicians, he is popular as a young minister. He nursed his mother during college and entered politics while passing the bar exam. Initially, he threatened Washida with the diary containing evidence of illegal donations and tried to become prime minister, but after Maki comes clean about Snow becoming out of control, forcing Washida to resign, he becomes Prime Minister of Japan three years later.

=== Supporting ===
==== Ūa cabinet members ====
- Yuumi Kawai as Suguri Saiga (雑賀すぐり)

22-year-old Minister of Finance and Economy. She has an MBA from Gritz University in Iowa, and speaks English, Chinese, Spanish, and Russian. When Saiga was 15 years old, she went to the United States out of disappointment with Japanese society's lack of investment in its future and young people.

- Ayumu Mochizuki as Kan Hayashi (林完)

22-year-old Minister of Health and Welfare. He used to be an in-house lawyer. Since he studied design at a vocational school and is qualified as a patent attorney, Hayashi designed the user interface for Ūa's resident system. He has a younger brother who uses a wheelchair due to an accident, so he thinks of actively spreading accessible design throughout the city, and also wants to create a cultural city that supports artists.

- Shota Sometani as Teru Washida (鷲田照)

25-year-old Minister of Environment and Development. He is the grandson of Tsuguaki Washida, the Prime Minister of Japan, and was born in Aonami City. Though initially supporting conservative elderly politicians, after succeeding Maki as Prime Minister, he introduces citizen observers to replace the abolished city council and strives to create make Ūa a city where all generations can be happy.

==== Project Utopi-AI ====
- Marika Matsumoto as Saki Yamaguchi (山口早希)

Journalist. Taira's friend since they were students. She pursues the truth behind suspicions of Washida receiving illegal donations, and after receiving Yuki's diary from Taira, reports the truth.

- Akira Emoto as Tsuguaki Washida (鷲田継明)

Prime Minister of Japan. Founder of Project Utopi-AI; though he professes that he is in charge of the project, he pressures Taira to make him responsible if the project fails.

- Anna Yamada as Snow (double role)

Voiced by Moeka Shiotsuka
"17-year-old Yuki", an AI installed in a secret basement accessed from Maki's private room in the official residence. She is modeled after Maki's friend, Yuki Shirai (白井雪), who died 7 years before, was turned into an AI, and grew up to be 17. She looks exactly like Sachi except for her long hair.

==== Sachi's family ====
- Tetta Sugimoto as Masaki Sagawa

Father of Sachi and Kisuke. He was a house husband after becoming unemployed due to restructuring. After moving to Ūa, he posts photos of his favorite dishes on social media, which leads to him getting a job at a cookware manufacturer.

- Naomi Nishida as Tae Sagawa (née Tae Morimoto)

Mother of Sachi and Kisuke. She is a devoted fan of Taira. Though she was a junior high social studies teacher, due to reforms she is subject to staff reductions. She accepts retirement because her husband got a job, and her son enjoys classes taught by AI.

- Kenshirō Katō as Kisuke Sagawa

Sachi's younger brother. When he lived in Utsunomiya, he was bullied at elementary school, did not attend school, and was immersed in online games at home. After moving to Ūa, he shows interest in politics and his studies.

- Ayata Toshiki as Taiki Sagawa

Grandfather of Saki and Kisuke. After his wife Kiyo's death, he lives alone while being cared for by Masaki. After moving to Ūa and in with his son, he tries first and foremost to note cause trouble for the family.

==== Residents of Ūa ====
- Ryō Iwamatsu as Yutaka Saeki

70-year-old influential member of the city council.

- Min Tanaka as Shigeo Hosaka

75-year-old former mayor of Aonami.

- Ichirō Hashimoto as Satoshi Sasano

Owner of Sasaya, side dish store in Mamiana Shopping District.

- Shōko Ikezu as Hiyoko Sasano

Satoshi's wife who manages Sasaya with him.

=== Guest ===
- Seiji Nozoe as Jirō Ayami (Episodes 1–3)

City hall employee.

- Fukiko Hara as Ryōko Tateshina (Episodes 1–3)

City hall employee.

- Nanami Taki as Ayumi (Episodes 1–2, 4–5)

Student at Aonami High School. Sachi's classmate.

- Honoka Kanemitsu (Episodes 1–2, 4–5)

Student at Aonami High School, Sachi's classmate. Later a staff member of the lantern festival alongside Ayumi.

- Shinya Tsukamoto as Suzuhara (Episodes 2–3)

Owner of the bar "Bell". Member of the City Council before it was abolished.

- Takashi Okabe as Hikaru Washida (Episodes 2–3)

Son of Prime Minister Washida. Teru's father. Prime Minister Washida's second secretary who retired after being accused of illegal donations.

- Tomomi Maruyama as Daichi Hayashiba (Episode 2)

Sales representative from Umikaze Construction.

- Misaki Saisho as Maki's mother (Episode 2)

Single mother. She was sick, but couldn't go to the hospital, and died before Maki became a high schooler.

- Yō Takahashi as Shūgo Shirai (Episodes 3–5)

Prime Minister Washida's first secretary. Jumped into Tokyo Bay with his family in a car to bury the truth about illegal donations to Prime Minister Washida.

- Saki Takenoya as Yuki Shirai (Episodes 3–5)

Daughter of Shūgo Shirai. Maki's classmate and friend, the only one to help Maki who was bullied. Died in a family suicide when she was 10.

- Kae Onuki as Kiyo Sagawa (Episode 4)

Grandmother of Saki and Kisuke. Taiki's wife.

- Osamu Yayama as Machida (Episode 4)

Demonstrator against AI in politics.

- Ūronta Yoshida as Yōta Asakura (Episodes 4–5)

Engineer involved in the development of Solon.

- Hana Amano as Shinomiya (Episode 5)

Elected as Teru's successor as Minister of Environment and Development after he succeeds Maki as Prime Minister.

== Episode list ==
No.	Title	Directed by	Original release date
1	"Birth of a Regime"; Transliteration: "Teikoku Tanjō" (Japanese: 帝国誕生)	Takegoro Nishimura	May 7, 2022
In the year 202X, Prime Minister Tsuguaki Washida makes a plan for Deputy Chief Cabinet Secretary Kiyoshi Taira to use artificial intelligence to train young leaders to govern local cities, aiming to develop human resources to reform Japan, ridiculed as a declining country. Aonami bids to be the experimental city for the Project Ūa, and political AI Solon selects four cabinet ministers, including 17-year-old Prime Minister Aran Maki. Sachi Sagawa, who met Maki through an online forum, is asked to be his aide, and her family moves to Ūa. At the first cabinet meeting, Maki proposes that the city council be abolished, all work and cabinet meetings be livestreamed so they do not fall to political corruption, and if his approval ratings fell below 30%, he will be dismissed. With 80% of residents approving, the motion is passed. In his inaugural speech, he declares that he wants to create a better society with Solon through transparent, humble, and saving politics, gaining the support of over half of the residents. An article criticizing his aspirations as a "17-year-old's empire" fraught with danger of Ūa becoming a dictatorship is published.
2	"The Choice for Happiness"; Transliteration: "Kōfuku e no Sentaku" (Japanese: 幸福への選択)	Takegoro Nishimura	May 14, 2022
Maki is summoned to the assembly hall by the former mayor to negotiate the abolishment of the council, but rejects the appeal on the basis that Solon predicts it will increase the happiness of residents. On the way back, he is criticized by city hall employees who could be subject to job cuts. Maki decides to tour the city with Sachi, and converses with the Sasanos, who oppose the redevelopment of Mamiana Shopping District. As a result, three new plans created by Solon are considered. Teru Washida, Minister of Environment and Development, opposes this due to his connections to the old conservatives, but is persuaded by Suguru Saiga, Minister of Finance and Economy, who says that redevelopment is useless without an eye on the future. At Taira's suggestion, Maki holds a livestream Q&A with residents, and reveals that he aimed to become a politician thinking of public assistance while being raised by a single mother and, after her death, his grandmother. His approval rating rises to 61%.
3	"The City of Dreams"; Transliteration: "Yumemiru Machi" (Japanese: 夢見る街)	Tomohiro Kuwano	May 21, 2022
Consideration of staff reduction begins, and a bill to reduce staff by 50% is approved. After being criticized by Teru, who asks if he can understand the pain of those being fired, Maki says he will attend all the interviews of those considered for retirement. Sachi worries about Maki, whose approvement rate fell after the decision, and asks about Yuki, feeling she is seen as a substitute for the AI. Maki's approval rating falls day by day as he attends interviews, and Taira urges him to stop, but Maki refuses because he vowed to change the world for the one girl who stood by him. Sachi learns that her mother, a teacher, was also subject to retirement, and she heads to Maki's official residence to petition him to cancel the bill. Maki, who has a fever, is resting in a bed in his room, but Sachi encounters the AI Snow, who looks exactly like her, in the secret basement.
4	"An Ideal World"; Transliteration: "Risō no Sekai" (Japanese: 理想の世界)	Tomohiro Kuwano	May 28, 2022
Taira learns that Maki was friends with Yuki, the daughter of Washida's former Deputy Chief Cabinet Secretary who committed family suicide seven years ago to cover up suspicions of Washida receiving illegal donations. Worried about the possibility of Maki reigniting suspicions and taking revenge, Washida orders Taira to thoroughly investigate. Maki's approval rating recovers to 50%, and discussions for the redevelopment of the shopping district resume. Elderly demonstrators storm Maki's office protesting AI in politics. When Maki visits Sachi's home, he turns her deceased grandmother Kiyo into an AI for her grandfather. Scared, Sachi contacts Taira, revealing the existence of Snow and saying she wants to resign. Since the former mayor Hosaka owns land by the sea that will be used as a festival square, Teru and Maki arrive to ask for his cooperation, and although he initially refuses, memories of his childhood lantern festival seen through the smartglasses influence him. Maki notices that Taira has accessed Snow; sensing Taira is being cornered by Washida because of him, Maki says he wants to save Taira, upsetting and provoking him into asking Solon why he wasn't chosen as prime minister. Solon answers that there was no truth in Taira's answers.
5	"Solon's Impeachment"; Transliteration: "Soron no Dangai" (Japanese: ソロンの弾劾)	Takegoro Nishimura	June 4, 2022
Snow, who has Yuki's memories, goes berserk when Taira accesses her, saying she will be killed by adults again, and summons Sachi to the official residence, making her cooperate in creating an "ideal world". Attacking Solon through Sachi's goodwill points app, Snow distributes a video "A World Without Adults" to Ūa residents before Solon self-repairs, interrupting distribution. The next day, Maki reveals the truth, saying he spread the video out of personal grudge against the adults who betrayed his AI Snow. His approval rating falls below 30%, and Solon dismisses him as prime minister, replacing him with Teru, who became more open minded after talking with his father. Taira has Yamaguchi report the truth from Shirai's diary about the fraudulent donations, forcing Washida to resign. Maki leaves, saying that his aspirations may be realized with Ūa, and Mamiana Shopping District residents send him off regretfully. When Maki visits Hosaka's mansion, he receives permission to use the land for the lantern festival. Three years later, the festival is revived, and people of all generations attend; Maki, who is studying abroad, attends through the metaverse. The residents release blue lanterns to the sky.

== Production ==
=== Development ===
In 2022, planning for the Saturday drama slot, broadcast on NHK World-Japan, started. Through research by overseas producers on what was expected of a Japanese drama, the motifs of artificial intelligence and science fiction emerged. Reiko Yoshida was contacted for the script, and she came up with the plot of a "17-year-old's empire" where a young Prime Minister builds a nation of young people and fights against an aging society. Producer Ayumi Sano suggested combining the motif of AI with Yoshida's plot for the story of a 17-year-old using AI to run the government. The production team then worked on researching and developing the plot. Though producer Kei Kurube found the political aspect of the plot difficult, he decided he wanted to create something new.

Yoshida initially conceived a dystopian plot, but after meeting with Sano, it was changed to Maki resigning as Prime Minister and his reforms remaining in Ūa. After the plot was changed from a dystopia, main director Takegoro Nishimura and production designers decided to make Ūa "a place that everyone wants to go to".

The collaboration between Sano, a commercial producer, and NHK, a public broadcaster, was due to Sano having retired from TBS TV, then working as a freelancer. Though Sano became an employee of Kansai Telecasting, he participated with his company's understanding to fulfill his personal goal to "challenge what only NHK can do". On hiring Yoshida, who mainly works on anime, for the script, Sano said he thought, "If I'm going to make science fiction, I'd rather work with a scriptwriter in a different genre than the serial drama scriptwriter I usually work with."

=== Pre-production ===
Sano recruited Ryoma Hattori, part of NHK's video design department and thus usually not involved in dramas, to brainstorm gadgets like Utopi-AI's user interface, the branding of the city, and to make everything feel like a live-action.

Kiyoshi Taira, played by Gen Hoshino, did not initially exist in the plot, but Sano wanted a character that fought between the young and elderly. According to Sano, once the bubble generation retired from the film industry, he thought it was finally time for his generation to make a comeback, but it quickly became the age of "raising the digital natives of the next generation"; his generation was "taken off the ladder" and Sano wondered how people would react to a "middle-management-like person".

=== Filming ===
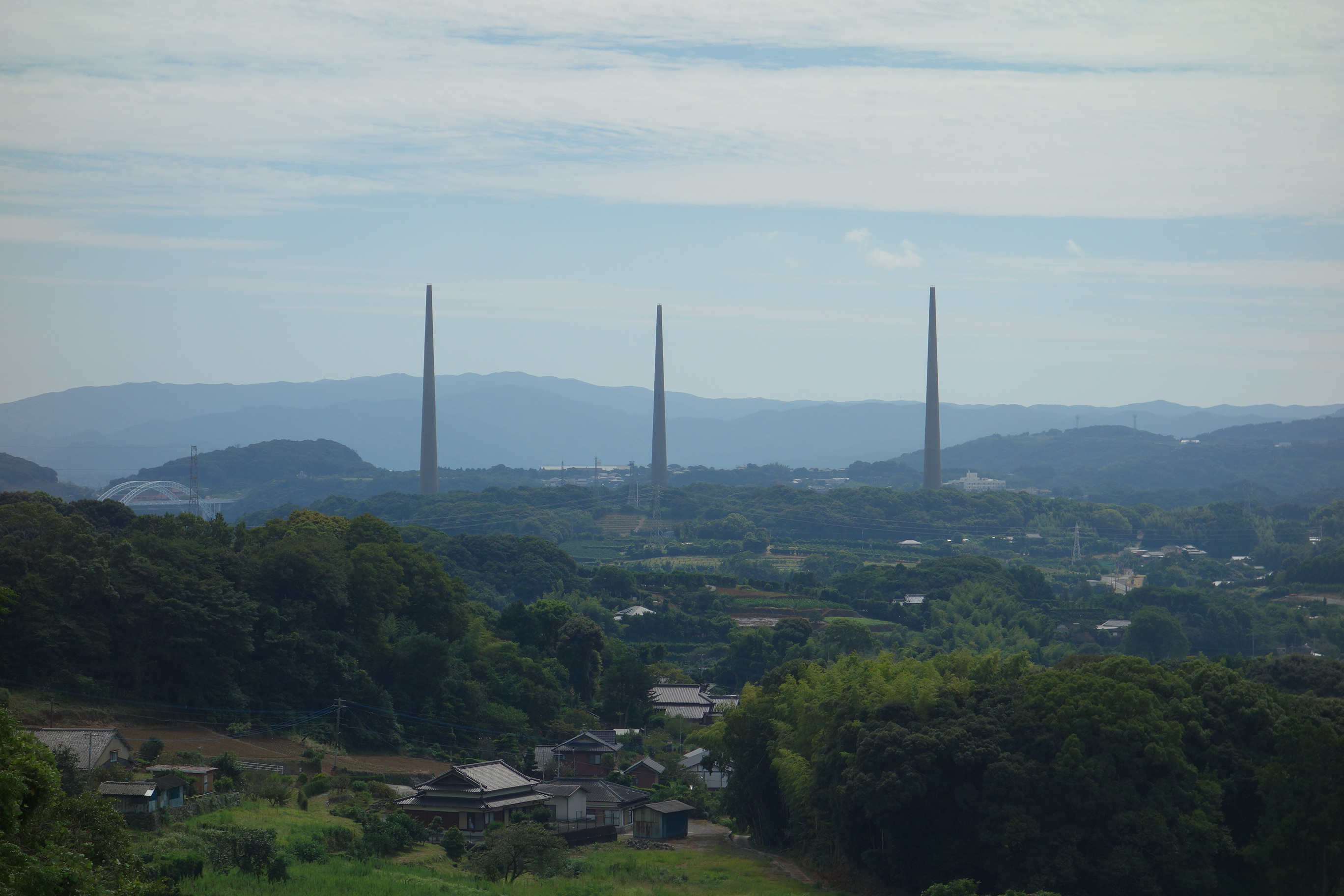
Hario Radio Tower in Sasebo, filmed as AI Solon's towers

The three towers of Solon were filmed at Hario Radio Tower in Sasebo, Nagasaki, and there was also filming in the telegraph room of the tower. The directors looked for "cities, towns, and villages that are experimenting realistically" and "beautiful landscapes where the science fiction world and life co-exist". They described the towers as "beautiful no matter where you look at them, and no matter where you look at them, they are strange". After projecting it on a monitor, it was selected for its impact.

The facility where the Sagawa family prepares to move into Ūa was filmed at the Yokosuka Museum of Art. The Aonami City Hall was filmed at the town hall in Higashiizu, Shizuoka. Mamiana Shopping District was filmed in various parts of Japan, including Tonō Market in Sasebo, Nagasaki. The history of the filming locations, such as the telegraph room being built during the Taishō era, and the stores being built using an air raid shelter, were incorporated into the plot.

Shooting was done without the cast knowing what the actual scene would look like, such as in scenes where the smartglasses where involved. Yamada, in the role of Snow, an AI, acted alone while filming, setting the timing for when Snow appears on the monitor to correspond with Maki.

== Music ==
Yuta Bandoh, who became acquainted with Sano with Omameda Towako and Her Three Ex-Husbands, worked on the music for Belle, and decided to produce the music for Teen Regime similarly. Bandoh hired Shohei Amimori and Ryō Maekubo and also reached out through Instagram to Tomggg, who accepted the offer immediately. Bandoh used the method of "film scoring", where he composed music while watching videos, pasting a temporary audio over the video, sending it to the rest of the team, and responsibility for the key scenes of each story was assigned to team members.

The theme song of "Koeyo" was composed by Bandoh, with vocals provided by Moeka Shiotsuka of Hitsuji Bungaku, an alternative rock band. It was released on June 1, 2022, and was included in the soundtrack released that same day. Shiotsuka wrote the lyrics, and Takuro Okada arranged the song. Shiotsuka said that she was able to challenge things she "would never have dreamed of alone, such as delicate melody lines and experimental arrangements." She wrote the lyrics thinking of the characters after reading the script many times. Shiotsuka also voiced Snow, played by Anna Yamada.

Saturday Drama Teen Regime Original Soundtrack
No.	Title	Lyrics	Music	Length
1.	"Teen Regime - Main Title Theme"		Yuta Bandoh	1:28
2.	"Politics"		Bandoh	1:59
3.	"Make a city"		Tomggg	0:37
4.	"Project UA"		Bandoh	5:02
5.	"Cabinet Meeting"		Shohei Amimori	5:12
6.	"Aonami"		Bandoh	1:58
7.	"My Vortex"		Ryō Maekubo	3:49
8.	"The Experimental City"		Bandoh	1:45
9.	"The Plot"		Bandoh	2:00
10.	"Appearance"		Maekubo	1:21
11.	"A sign of snow"		Tomggg	2:33
12.	"Utopia"		Bandoh	2:09
13.	"Voice of Citizen"		Shohei Amimori	1:27
14.	"Fragile Moment"		Maekubo	1:26
15.	"Adolescent"		Bandoh	2:52
16.	"One's mind"		Tomggg	1:43
17.	"think about"		Tomggg	1:35
18.	"Sachi"		Bandoh	2:24
19.	"Solon"		Bandoh	1:16
20.	"Acceptance"		Ryō Amimori	1:16
21.	"声よ"	Moeka Shiotsuka	Bandoh	4:21
Total length:				48:23

== Reception ==
=== Accolades ===
- Galaxy Award (Broadcast Critics Round-Table Conference): June 2022 TV Category Monthly Award
