= Asobiai =

Japanese manga series

- First volume cover

あそびあい
- Genre: Romance
- Manga
- Written by: Akira Nitta
- Published by: Kodansha
- Magazine: Monthly Morning Two
- Original run: February 22, 2013 – March 20, 2015
- Volumes: 3

Asobiai (あそびあい; lit. 'Mutual Pleasure') is a Japanese manga series written and illustrated by Akira Nitta. It was serialized in Kodansha's seinen manga magazine Monthly Morning Two from February 2013 to March 2015, with its chapters collected in three tankōbon' volumes.

== Publication ==
Written and illustrated by Akira Nitta, Asobiai was serialized in Kodansha's seinen manga magazine Monthly Morning Two from February 22, 2013, to March 20, 2015. Kodansha collected its chapters in three tankōbon' volumes, released from November 22, 2013, to April 23, 2015.

=== Volumes ===
No.	Japanese release date	Japanese ISBN
1	November 22, 2013	978-4-06-387270-5
2	July 23, 2014	978-4-06-388347-3
3	April 23, 2015	978-4-06-388452-4

== Reception ==
Alongside The Magical Girl and the Evil Lieutenant Used to Be Archenemies, Asobiai ranked 19th on Takarajimasha's Kono Manga ga Sugoi! list of best manga of 2015 for male readers.

== See also ==
- Koi no Tsuki, another manga series by the same author
