= Koi no Tsuki =

Japanese manga series

- First volume cover

恋のツキ
- Genre: Romance
- Manga
- Written by: Akira Nitta
- Published by: Kodansha
- Magazine: Monthly Morning Two
- Original run: December 22, 2015 – April 22, 2019
- Volumes: 7
- Television drama
- Directed by: Mai Sakai; Hana Matsumoto; Kenji Kuwajima
- Produced by: Kentarō Yamato; Teruhisa Yamamoto (chief); Kazutaka Sakamoto (cooperation); Yūsuke Kamanaka; Azusa Ibara
- Written by: Ryō Takada; Peyoung Maki; Takamasa Ōe
- Original network: TV Tokyo
- Original run: July 27, 2018 – October 12, 2018
- Episodes: 12

Koi no Tsuki (恋のツキ), also known as Love and Fortune, is a Japanese manga series written and illustrated by Akira Nitta. It was serialized in Kodansha's seinen manga magazine Monthly Morning Two from December 2015 to April 2019, with its chapters collected in seven tankōbon volumes. A twelve-episode television drama adaptation was broadcast on TV Tokyo from July to October 2018.

== Characters ==
Wako Taira (平 ワコ, Taira Wako)
Portrayed by: Eri Tokunaga
Fu (ふうくん, Fū-kun) / Futa Aoi (青井 ふうた, Aoi Fūta) (in the drama adaptation)
Portrayed by: Daichi Watanabe
Yumeaki Iko (伊古 ユメアキ, Iko Yumeaki)
Portrayed by: Fuju Kamio

== Media ==
=== Manga ===
Written and illustrated by Akira Nitta, Koi no Tsuki was serialized in Kodansha's seinen manga magazine Monthly Morning Two from December 22, 2015, to April 22, 2019. Kodansha collected its chapters in seven tankōbon volumes, released from July 22, 2016, to June 21, 2019.

==== Volumes ====
No.	Japanese release date	Japanese ISBN
1	July 22, 2016	978-4-06-388628-3
2	November 22, 2016	978-4-06-388670-2
3	May 23, 2017	978-4-06-388731-0
4	December 21, 2017	978-4-06-510740-9
5	June 22, 2018	978-4-06-511479-7
6	December 21, 2018	978-4-06-514113-7
7	June 21, 2019	978-4-06-511479-7

=== Drama ===
In June 2018, it was announced that the series would receive a television drama adaptation. The series was broadcast for twelve episodes on TV Tokyo from July 27 to October 12, 2018. (Note: TV Tokyo listed the air dates for the series on Thursday at 25:00, which is effectively Friday at 1:00 a.m. JST.) The series was also streamed on Netflix.

== See also ==
- Asobiai, another manga series by the same author
