= The Decagon House Murders (manga) =

Japanese manga series

- First tankōbon volume cover, featuring (clockwise from bottom) Ellery, Leroux, Orczy, Agatha, Van, Poe, and Carr

十角館の殺人 (Jukkakukan no Satsujin)
- Genre: Horror; Mystery; Thriller
- Manga
- Written by: Yukito Ayatsuji
- Illustrated by: Hiro Kiyohara
- Published by: Kodansha
- English publisher: NA: Kodansha USA (digital); Pushkin Press (print); UK: Pushkin Press
- Imprint: Afternoon KC
- Magazine: Monthly Afternoon
- Original run: August 24, 2019 – April 25, 2022
- Volumes: 5
- icon

The Decagon House Murders (Japanese: 十角館の殺人, Hepburn: Jukkakukan no Satsujin) is a Japanese manga series, based on the novel The Decagon House Murders by Yukito Ayatsuji and illustrated by Hiro Kiyohara. It was serialized in Kodansha's seinen manga magazine Monthly Afternoon from August 2019 to April 2022, with its chapters collected in five tankōbon volumes. Kodansha USA has licensed the manga for an English digital release in North America, while Pushkin Press has licensed it for a print release.

== Plot ==
The series follows a group of seven university students who travel to a deserted island where a strange, decagon-shaped mansion stands. Six months earlier, it was the scene of a grisly mass murder, and soon, ominous events begin to unfold.

== Publication ==
Based on the novel The Decagon House Murders by Yukito Ayatsuji and illustrated by Hiro Kiyohara, The Decagon House Murders was serialized in Kodansha's seinen manga magazine Monthly Afternoon from August 24, 2019, to April 25, 2022. Kodansha collected its chapters in five individual tankōbon volumes, released from November 22, 2019, to May 23, 2022.

Kodansha USA published the series digitally in North America from August 17, 2021, to November 29, 2022. In November 2026, it was announced that Pushkin Press would begin releasing print volumes of the series under its Pushkin Vertigo imprint on March 9, 2027.

=== Volumes ===
No.	Original release date	Original ISBN	English release date	English ISBN
1	November 22, 2019	978-4-06-517511-8	August 17, 2021	978-1-63699-298-3
2	August 21, 2020	978-4-06-520225-8	September 21, 2021	978-1-63699-365-2
3	March 23, 2021	978-4-06-522661-2	October 19, 2021	978-1-63699-417-8
4	October 21, 2021	978-4-06-525035-8	April 5, 2022	978-1-68491-111-0
5	May 23, 2022	978-4-06-527854-3	November 29, 2022	978-1-68491-563-7
