= Cocoa Fujiwara =

Japanese manga artist and illustrator

- 藤原 ここあ
- Born: April 28, 1983; Kitakyushu, Japan
- Died: March 31, 2015 (aged 31)
- Occupations: Manga artist; illustrator
- Years active: 1999–2015
- Notable work: Dear; Inu × Boku SS

Cocoa Fujiwara (Japanese: 藤原 ここあ, Hepburn: Fujiwara Kokoa; April 28, 1983 – March 31, 2015) was a Japanese manga artist and illustrator from Fukuoka Prefecture. Her debut was with a work called Calling, which she made when she was fifteen. She chose not to go to high school so that she could draw manga. Fujiwara was a fan of RPGs such as Final Fantasy, which shows in her works. She was also good friends of Jun Mochizuki and Yana Toboso.

Fujiwara's works Watashi no Ookami-san and Dear have both been published in Square Enix's Monthly Gangan Wing. Two drama CDs have been made of her work Dear. Fujiwara's manga Inu × Boku SS was adapted into an anime series by David Production which aired in Japan between January and March 2012. At the time of her death, she was serializing her manga The Magical Girl and the Evil Lieutenant Used to Be Archenemies in Square Enix's Gangan Joker online magazine, leaving the series unfinished. In November 2023, an anime adaptation of The Magical Girl and the Evil Lieutenant Used to Be Archenemies was announced and it aired from July to September 2024.

== Works ==
=== Manga ===
- Calling
- Stray Doll
- Watashi no Ookami-san
- Dear
- Ojō-sama to Yōkai Shitsuji (お嬢様と妖怪執事)
- Inu × Boku SS
- The Magical Girl and the Evil Lieutenant Used to Be Archenemies

=== Drama CDs ===
- Dear
- Dear: A story of the next day
