= List of public art in Montreal =

This is a partial list of public art in Montreal, Quebec, Canada.

== Artworks ==
Image	Common Title	Official Title	Location	Artist / Designer	Year	Notes
	After Babel, a Civic Square	After Babel, a Civic Square	Le Parterre	Marlene Hilton-Moore and Jean McEwen	1993	
	Anamnèse 1+1	Anamnèse 1+1	Frédéric-Back Park	Alain-Martin Richard	2017	
	Angel of Victory	L'Ange de la Victoire	Windsor Station	Coeur de Lion McCarthy	1922	
	Athéna	Athéna	Athena Park	Spyros Gokakis	1997	
	Boer War Memorial	Monument aux héros de la guerre des Boers	Dorchester Square	George William Hill	1907	
	Cactus modulaire	Cactus modulaire	La Laurentienne Building	Robert Roussil	1986	
	Cadran solaire	Cadran solaire	Rio Tinto Alcan Planetarium	Herman J. van der Heide	1967	
	Les cariatides	Les cariatides	René Lévesque Park	Dominique Valade	1988	
	Cenotaph	Cenotaph	Place du Canada		1924	
	Cheval à plume	Cheval à plume	René Lévesque Park	Miroslav Frederik Maler	1988	
	China Wall	China Wall	René Lévesque Park	Jean-Marie Delavalle	1986	
	Les chuchoteuses	Les chuchoteuses	Rue Saint-Paul	Rose-Aimée Bélanger	2002	
	Cité Mémoire	Cité Mémoire	Old Montreal	Michel Lemieux and Victor Pilon	2017	
	Continuum 2009 (à la mémoire de Pierre Perrault)	Continuum 2009 (à la mémoire de Pierre Perrault)	Promenade Bellerive Park	Roland Poulin	2009	
	Danse de la Paix	Danse de la Paix	McGill University	Robert Roussil	1963	
	Le déjeuner sur l'herbe	Le déjeuner sur l'herbe	René Lévesque Park	Roger Langevin	1990	
	Debout	Debout	La Fontaine Park	Dominque Rolland	1997	
	Détour : le grand jardin	Détour : le grand jardin	René Lévesque Park	Michel Goulet	1994	
	Écluses	Écluses	René Lévesque Park	Octavian Olariu	1994	
	Edward VII Monument	Monument à Édouard VII	Phillips Square	Louis-Philippe Hébert	1914	
	The English Pug and the French Poodle	The English Pug and the French Poodle	500 Place D'Armes	Marc Andre J. Fortier	2013	
	Enterspace		near Peel station	Maurice Lemieux	1981	
	Entourage Guimard	Entourage Guimard	Victoria Square	Hector Guimard	1967	
	Exaltation	Exaltation	McGill University	Giovanni (John) Porretta	1967	
	Explorer	Explorer	René Lévesque Park	Mark Prent	1994	
	Female Landscape	Female Landscape	Place Ville Marie	Gerald Gladstone	1972	
	Fenêtre sur l'avenir	Fenêtre sur l'avenir	McGill University	Marcel Barbeau	1992	
	La Fermière	La Fermière	Maisonneuve Market	Alfred Laliberté	1915	
	Fontaine du Square Saint-Louis	Fontaine du Square Saint-Louis	Saint-Louis Square	Jordan L. Mott	1849	
	From A	From A	René Lévesque Park	Takera Narita	1986	
	George-Étienne Cartier Monument	Monument à George-Étienne Cartier	Mount Royal Park	George William Hill	1919	
	Hermès	Hermès	René Lévesque Park	Graham Cantieni	1988	
	Hommage à Marguerite Bourgeoys	Hommage à Marguerite Bourgeoys	Place Marguerite-Bourgeoys	Jules Lasalle	1988	
	Hommage à Maurice Richard	Hommage à Maurice Richard		Annick Bourgeau		
	Hommage à René Lévesque	Hommage à René Lévesque	René Lévesque Park	Robert Roussil	1988	
	Ignace Bourget Monument		Mary, Queen of the World Cathedral	Louis-Philippe Hébert	1903	
	Irish Commemorative Stone					
	Jeanne Mance Monument		Hôtel-Dieu de Montréal	Louis-Philippe Hébert		
	John Young Monument	Monument à John Young	Old Port of Montreal	Louis-Philippe Hébert	1911	
	La Joute	La Joute	Place Jean-Paul-Riopelle	Jean-Paul Riopelle	1970	
	La Leçon (The Lesson)	La Leçon (The Lesson)	Sherbrooke Street West	Cédric Loth	2012	
	Les leçons singulières (volet 2)	Les leçons singulières (volet 2)	La Fontaine Park	Michel Goulet	1991	
	Lion of Belfort	Le lion de Belfort	Dorchester Square	George William Hill, Robert Findlay	1897	
	Le Lion de la Feuillée	Le Lion de la Feuillée	Montreal Botanical Garden	René Dardel	1831	
	Macdonald Monument	Monument à Sir John A. Macdonald	Place du Canada	George Edward Wade	1895	
	Maisonneuve Monument	Monument à Paul de Chomedey, sieur de Maisonneuve	Place d'Armes	Louis-Philippe Hébert	1893	
	Marie-Victorin Statue	Monument au Frère Marie-Victorin	Place d'Armes	Sylvia Daoust	1951	
	Mihai Eminescu Statue	Hommage à Mihai Eminescu, poète roumain	Parc Devonshire/Place de la Roumanie	Vasile Gorduz	2005	
	Monument à Isabelle la Catholique	Monument à Isabelle la Catholique	Sir Wilfrid Laurier Park	José Planes	1958	
	Monument aux braves de N.D.G.	Monument aux braves de N.D.G.		David Estrom	1919	
	Monument aux Braves de Verdun	Monument aux Braves de Verdun		Coeur de lion McCarthy	1924	
	Mount Royal Cross	Mount Royal Cross	Mount Royal			
	Nelson's Column	Monument à Nelson	Place Jacques-Cartier	Robert Mitchell	1809	
	Nicolaus Copernicus Monument	[Monument à Nicolas Copernic	Rio Tinto Alcan Planetarium	Bertel Thorvaldsen	1967	
	Non titré (Murale peinte)	Non titré (Murale peinte)	Parc Marcel-Léger	artist unknown	1850	
	Obélisque en Hommage à Charles de Gaulle	Obélisque en Hommage à Charles de Gaulle	La Fontaine Park	Olivier Debré	1992	
	The Passing Song	The Passing Song	René Lévesque Park	Catherine Widgery	1992	
	Les petits baigneurs	Les petits baigneurs		Alfred Laliberté	1916	
	Le phare d'Archimède	Le phare d'Archimède	René Lévesque Park	Domininqe Rolland	1986	
	La pierre et le feu	La pierre et le feu	René Lévesque Park	Jean-Pierre Morin	1985	
	Pioneers' Obelisk		Place d'Youville	J.A.U. Baudry	1893	
	Polypède	Polypède	McGill University	Charles Daudelin	1967	
	Robert Burns Memorial	Monument à Robert Burns	Dorchester Square	George Anderson Lawson	1930	
	Roddick Gates		McGill University	Gratton D. Thompson		
	Salvador Allende Monument	L'arc	Parc Jean-Drapeau	Michel de Broin	2009	
	Signal pour Takis	Signal pour Takis	René Lévesque Park	Pierre Leblanc	1986	
	Site/Interlude	Site/Interlude	René Lévesque Park	David Moore	1994	
	Souvenir de 1955 ou 2026 Roberval	Souvenir de 1955 ou 2026 Roberval	René Lévesque Park	Pierre Leblanc	1992	
	Square Forms and Circles	Square Forms and Circles	McGill University	Barbara Hepworth	1963	
	Statue of Amphitrite, wife of Poseidon	Statue of Amphitrite, wife of Poseidon	World Trade Centre Montreal	Dieudonné-Barthélémy Guibal	1750	
	Statue of Adam Dollard des Ormeaux	Monument à Dollard des Ormeaux	La Fontaine Park	Alfred Laliberté and Alphonse Venne	1920	
	Statue of André Bessette	Monument au Frère André	Place du frère Andre	Émile Brunet	1986	
	Statue of Émilie Gamelin	Monument à Émilie Gamelin		Raoul Hunter	1999	
	Statue of Guy Lafleur		Bell Centre			
	Statue of Howie Morenz		Bell Centre			
	Statue of Jean Béliveau		Bell Centre			
	Statue of Jean Drapeau	Monument à Jean Drapeau	Place de la Dauversière	Annick Bourgeau	2001	
	Statue of Jean Vauquelin	Monument à Jean Vauquelin	Vauquelin Square	Eugène-Paul Benet	1927	
	Statue of Maurice Richard		Bell Centre			
	Story Rock	Story Rock	René Lévesque Park	Bill Vazan	1986	
	Statue of Sir Louis-Hippolyte La Fontaine	Monument à Sir Louis-Hippolyte La Fontaine	La Fontaine Park	Henri Hébert	1930	
	Tai Chi Single Whip	Victoria Square		Ju Ming		
	Tenderness	corner of Sherbrooke Street & Peel Street		Paul Lancz		
	The Three Graces (Whitney)	Three Bares Fountain	McGill University	Gertrude Vanderbilt Whitney	1913	
	Tower of Songs, Hommage à Leonard Cohen	Tower of Songs, Hommage à Leonard Cohen	Crescent Street	Miles MacGregor (El Mac), Gene Pendon	2017	
	Victoria Memorial	Monument à la reine Victoria	Victoria Square	Marshall Wood	1869	
	Le Village imaginé. «Le Renard l’emporte, le suit à la trace…»	Le Village imaginé. «Le Renard l’emporte, le suit à la trace…»	Marguerite Bourgeoys Park	Pierre Bourgault	2005	
	La ville blanche	La ville blanche	René Lévesque Park	André Fournelle	1986	
	Vire au vent	Vire au vent	René Lévesque Park	Gilles Boisvert	1988	
	Vortexit II	Vortexit II	René Lévesque Park	Bill Vazan	2009	
	Les voûtes d'Ulysse	Les voûtes d'Ulysse	René Lévesque Park	Guy Nadeau	1992	
	War Memorial of Montreal West		Memorial Park, Montreal West	George William Hill	1921	
	Wilfrid Laurier Memorial	Monument à Sir Wilfrid Laurier	Dorchester Square	Joseph-Émile Brunet	1953	
