= Maurice Richard (disambiguation) =

Maurice Richard (1921–2000), was a Canadian ice hockey player.

Maurice Richard may also refer to:

People

- Maurice Richard (politician) (born 1946), Canadian politician from Quebec
- Maurice Richard (French politician) (1832-1888)

Things named after the hockey player

- Maurice Richard (film) or The Rocket, a film about the ice hockey player
- Maurice-Richard, a provincial electoral district in Quebec
- Maurice "Rocket" Richard Trophy, awarded annually to the leading goal scorer in the NHL
- Statue of Maurice Richard, outside the Bell Centre, Montreal, Quebec, Canada

== See also ==
- Maurice Richards (born 1945), Welsh dual-code rugby player
- Richard Maurice (1893-1955), American silent-era filmmaker
- Richard Maurice (explorer) (1859-1909), Australian explorer
