= Exalt =

Exalt, exaltation or exalted may refer to:

- Exaltation (astrology), a characteristic of a planet in astrology
- Exaltation (Mormonism), a belief in The Church of Jesus Christ of Latter-day Saints
- Exaltation of Christ or "Session of Christ", a Christian doctrine
- Exaltation of the Cross or "Feast of the Cross", an Orthodox Christian holiday
- Exaltation, in Freemasonry, the initiation ritual into the Holy Royal Arch degree
- Exaltation (sculpture)
- LG Exalt, a flip phone
- Exalted (role-playing game), produced by White Wolf
  - Exalted (comics), a 2005–07 comic based on the game

== See also ==
- Exaltación (disambiguation)
- The Exalter (Ar-Rāfiʿ), in Islam, one of the 99 names of Allah
- The Exalted One, nickname of professional wrestler Brodie Lee
