= Wilfrid Laurier Memorial =

Monument in Montreal, Canada

- Monument à Sir Wilfrid Laurier
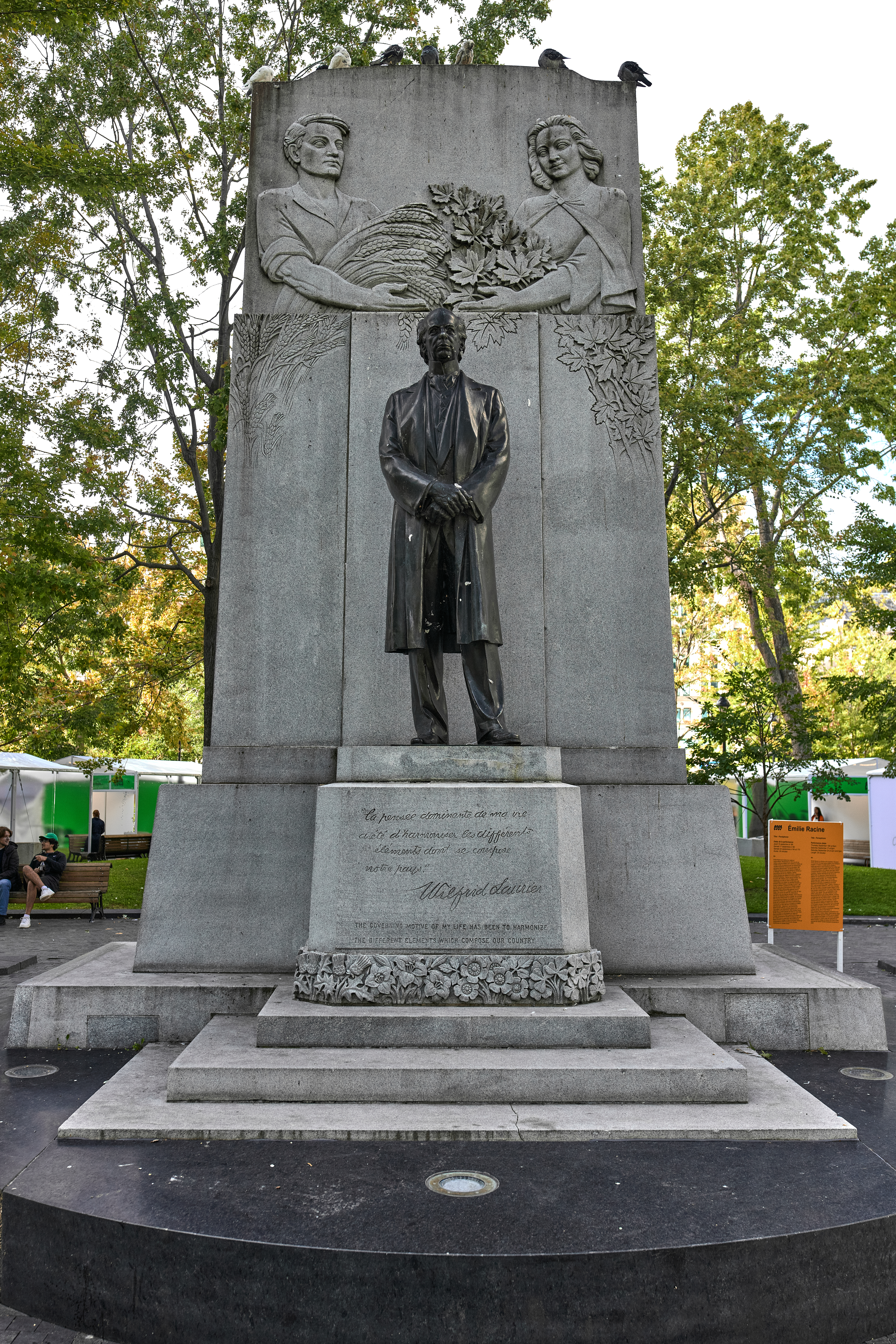
- Interactive map of Wilfrid Laurier Memorial
- Location: Dorchester Square
- Coordinates: 45°29′57.804″N 73°34′13.7532″W
- Designer: Joseph-Émile Brunet (1893 - 1977)
- Type: Monument
- Material: bronze, granite
- Opening date: October 12, 1953
- Dedicated to: Wilfrid Laurier

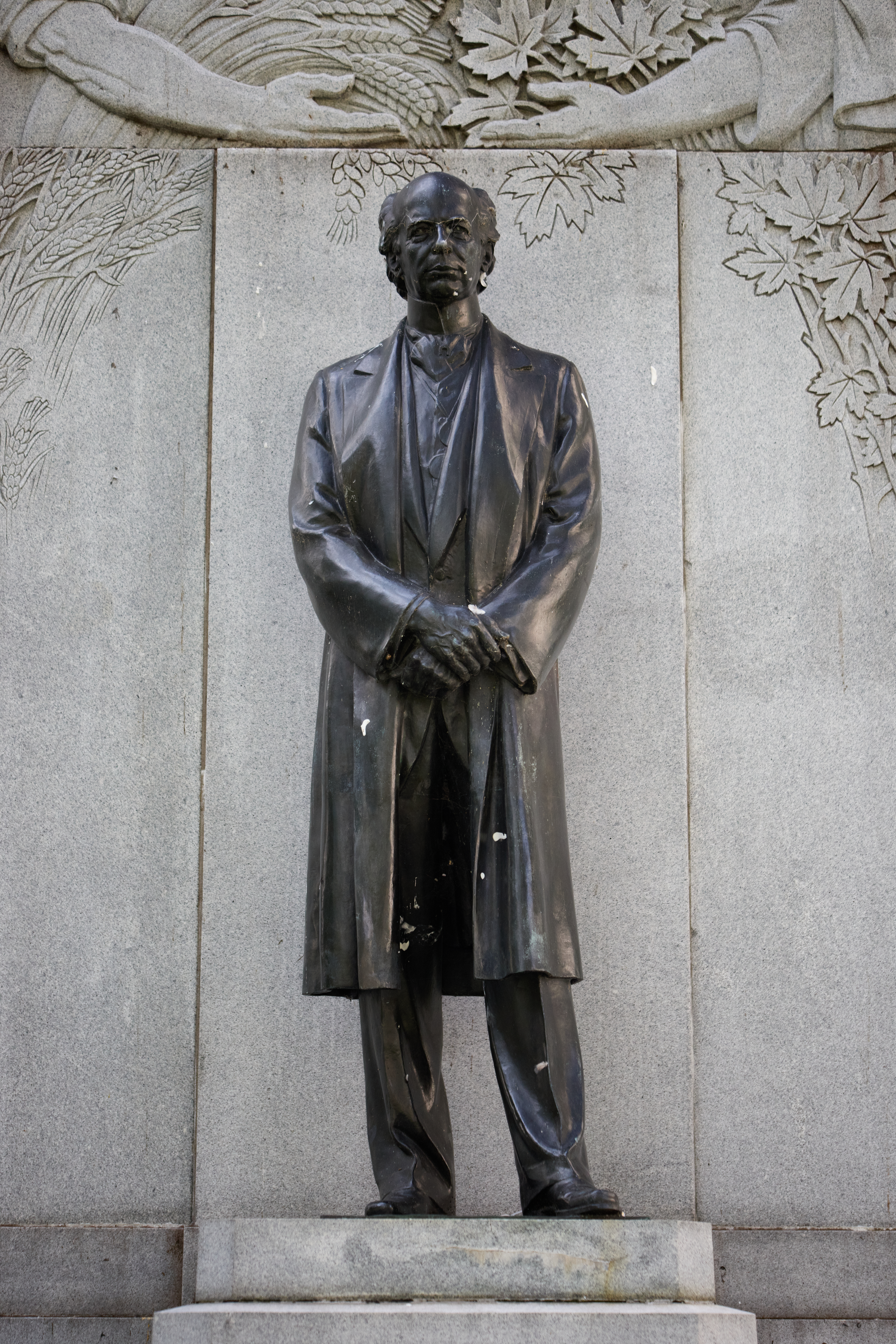
The statue of Laurier

The Wilfrid Laurier Memorial (French: Monument à Sir Wilfrid Laurier) is a monument to the seventh Prime Minister of Canada. It is located in Dorchester Square in Downtown Montreal, Quebec, Canada.

== Overview ==
The Sir Wilfrid Laurier Memorial was constructed in 1953 by Joseph-Émile Brunet on the southern side of Dorchester Square, facing towards the United States. Wilfrid Laurier was a proponent of an early free-trade agreement with the United States and wanted to develop a more continental economic orientation. Also, as Canada's first French Canadian prime minister, he faces off against the tribute to Sir John A. Macdonald, across the street in what is now Place du Canada.

Macdonald is enshrined in a stone baldachin emblazoned with copper reliefs of the various agricultural and industrial trades. Laurier stands with the shelter of the massive trees which characterize the square, a granite relief of the provinces created and united under his administrations opposite a bas-relief of man and woman sharing the harvest.

Laurier also stands with his back facing the back of the Boer War Memorial — It was Britain's wish, but Laurier was not prepared to freely commit Canadian troops to Pretoria. The Boer War placed great strains on Laurier's cabinet, because a decision to send troops as required, could also have been construed as Canada's perpetual support to all England's wars. Laurier did not wish to alienate Canadian Imperialists and French Canadians. In the end, public demand won through, with Canada sending 7,300 Canadians to South Africa, of which roughly one-third were official contingents.

The Laurier Memorial Committee was founded in 1948 under the auspices of the Canadian Democratic Institute and the Canadian Unity Alliance in order to erect a memorial to Sir Wilfrid Laurier. His inauguration took place on October 12, 1953. The activities of the Monument Committee ended at the end of 1954.
