= Le Parterre =

Public square in Montreal, Canada

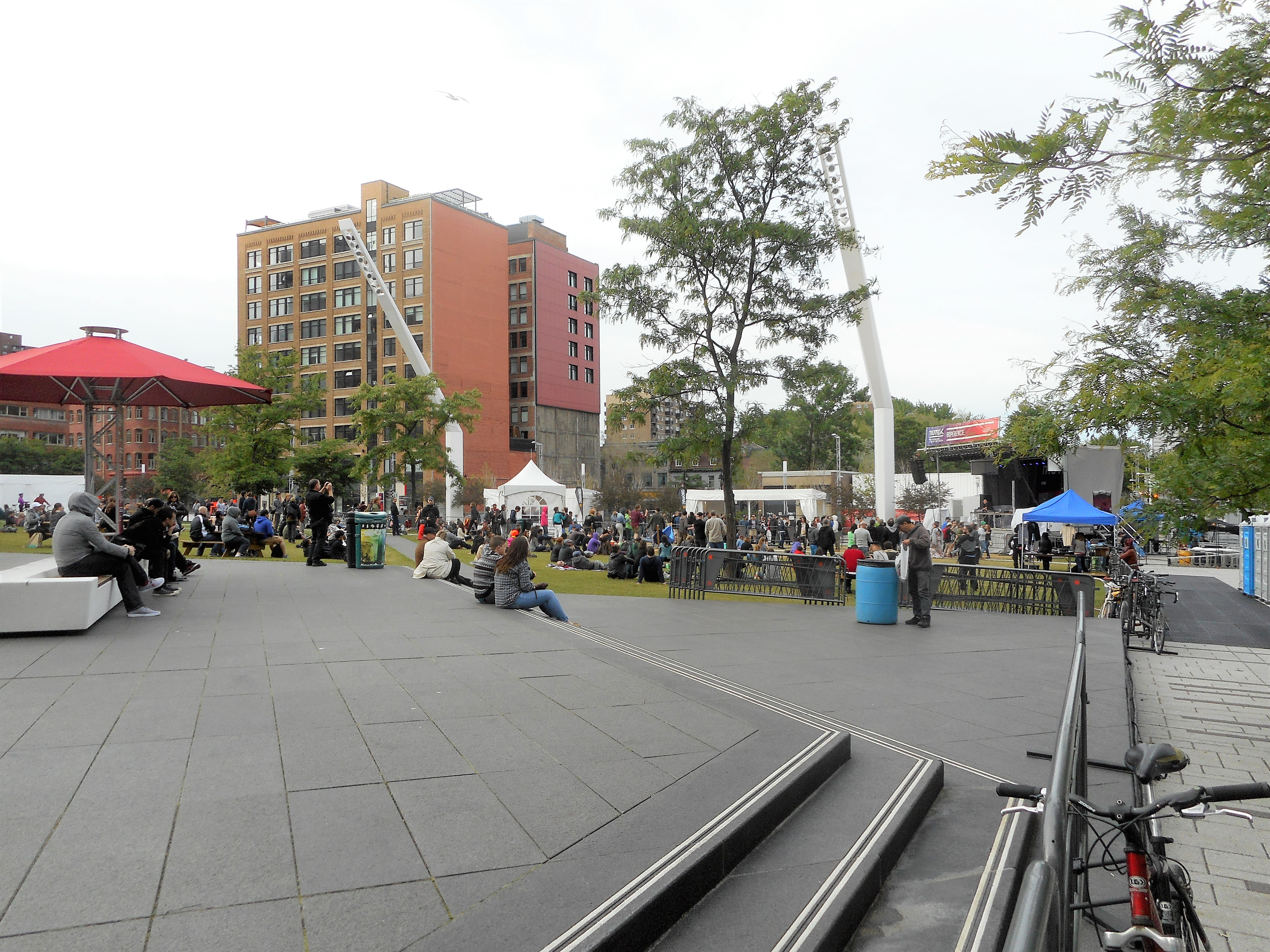

- Location within Montreal
- Location: Quartier des spectacles, Ville-Marie, Montreal, Quebec, Canada
- Coordinates: 45°30′36.07″N 73°33′59.95″W

Le Parterre, originally called Place de l'Adresse-Symphonique, is a public square in the Quartier des spectacles district in Montreal, Quebec, Canada. The space, in front of the Maison symphonique de Montréal, is intended as a performance space for different musical ensembles, as well as a setting for highlighting the architecture of the symphony house.

== Name ==
The name was formalized in 2009 and “illustrates the role of space, in the natural form of tiers, from which the public can attend the shows that are held below. It also refers to the type of layout of the space, which is made largely of grass.

== History ==
The construction of the square began in the spring of 2009 and finished in 2010, during the reconfiguration of De Maisonneuve Boulevard between Saint Laurent Boulevard and Saint Urbain Street.

The reconfiguration accompanied the replacement of the two then triangular green spaces (places Fred-Barry and Albert-Duquesne). The modified public space fills the square and has mineral and green surfaces. The square's name was changed from place de l'Adresse-Symphonique to Le Parterre.

== Art ==
=== After Babel, A Civic Square ===
After Babel, A Civic Square
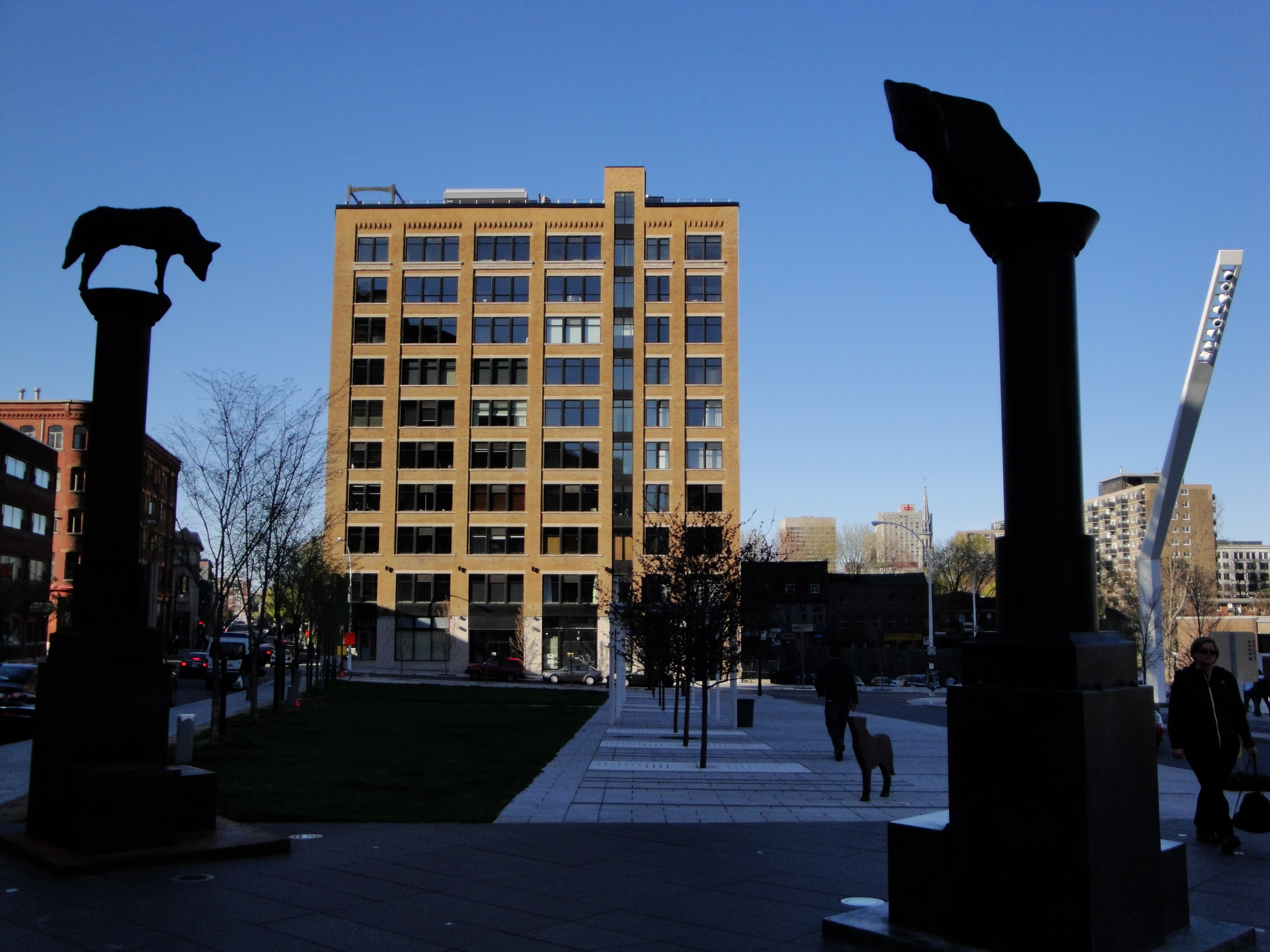
- Artists: Marlene Hilton-Moore and Jean McEwen
- Year: 1993
- Medium: Sculpture
- Location: Montreal, Quebec, Canada; 45°30′36.38″N 73°34′1.6″W

After Babel, A Civic Square, created by Marlene Hilton-Moore and Jean McEwen, is a sculpture in the square composed of two columns and a silhouette of a dog. At the top of the bronze column and the steel column are respectively a mask with an ear toward the ground and another dog silhouette.

The sculpture was a gift from the city of Toronto for Montreal's 350th anniversary and the event Toronto fête Montréal. It was chosen following an invitation-only competition and was installed in 1993.
