= Cenotaph (Montreal) =

Canadian war memorial monument in Montreal

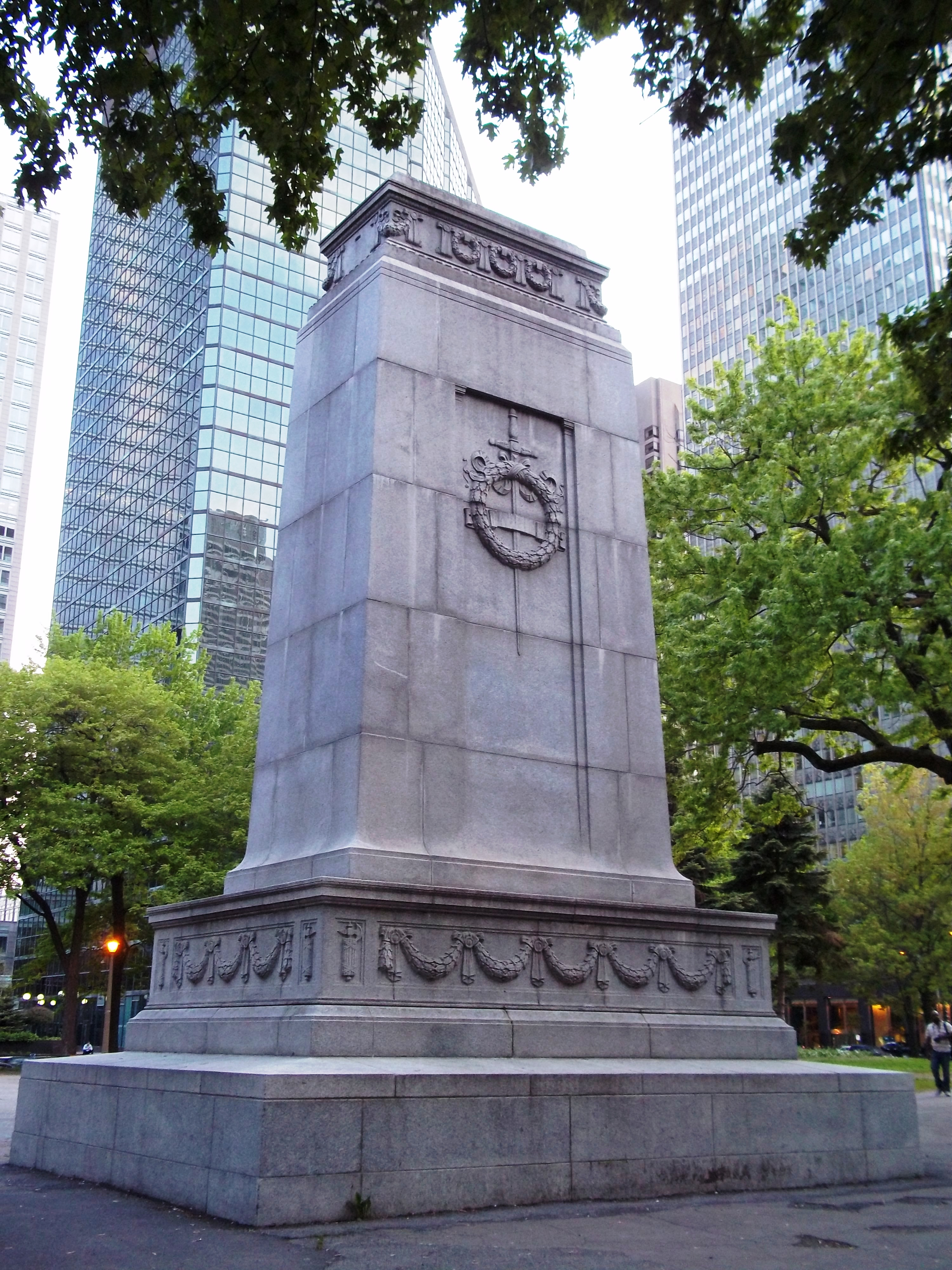
- Cenotaph
- Interactive map of Cenotaph
- Location: Place du Canada
- Coordinates: 45°29′55.079″N 73°34′7.878″W
- Builder: Anglin-Norcross Ltd.
- Type: Monument
- Material: bronze, granite
- Opening date: 1921
- Dedicated to: combatants in World War I, World War II, and Korean War

The Cenotaph is a public monument in Montreal, Quebec, Canada, that commemorates the men and women of Montreal that were killed in the First and Second World Wars as well as the Korean War. It is made of white granite, with plaques of bronze

== History ==
Montreal's original war memorial was a wall made out of plaster that was transported around the city for ceremonial use. After the 1918 Armistice, a need arose for a more permanent monument. An initial proposal came in the form of a "War Memorial Boulevard"; a street lined with trees and bronze shields honoring individual regiments, battalions and batteries on Atwater Avenue. The original proposal was ultimately cancelled due to high projected costs.

In lieu of the more costly proposal, the Montreal Women's Club came with a proposal to plant 840 trees along Sherbrooke Street West during 1922 to make a "road of remembrance". Each tree had a plaque that commemorated an individual soldier at the request of family or friends, although few of the original planted trees still survive today

The Cenotaph monument itself was unveiled by The then-Governor General of Canada, Lord Byng of Vimy, in Dominion Square (now Place du Canada), on November 11th, 1924. The monument was directly inspired by the eponymous Cenotaph, of Whitehall, London.

The monument has been the traditional site for Montreal's Remembrance Day ceremonies up until 2009 where it was moved to McGill University due to park renovations. The ceremonies would continue to be held at the University due to the larger space available until 2016, where it was moved back to Place du Canada again due to road construction.

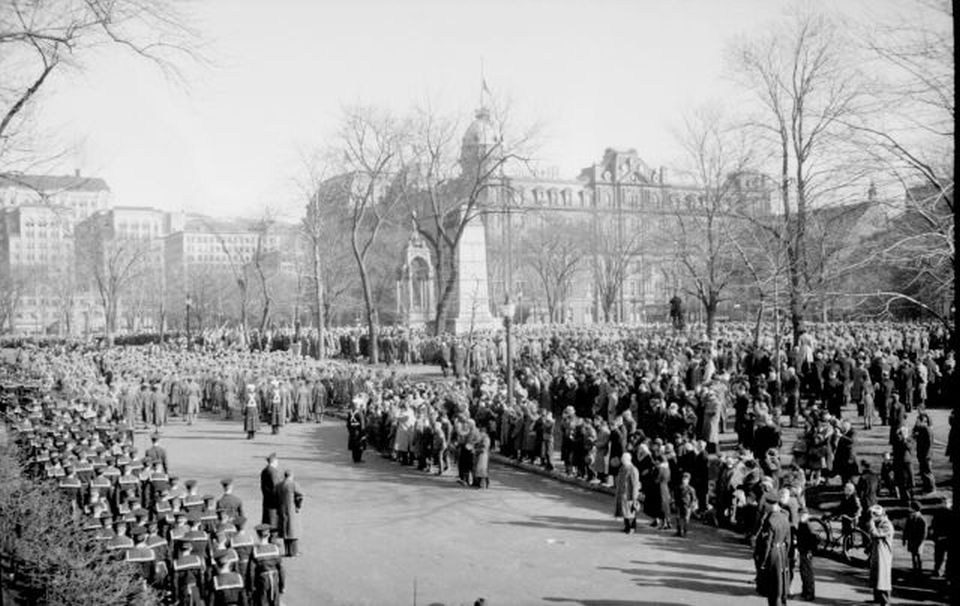
Montreal Armistice Service in 1937

== Extra Reading ==
- Alan Gordon, Making Public Pasts: The Contested Terrain of Montreal's Public Memories, 1891–1930. McGill-Queen's University Press, 2001, p. 93.
