= Statue of Mihai Eminescu (Montreal) =

Sculpture in Montreal, Quebec, Canada

Coordinates: 45.514795°N 73.57652°W

Mihai Eminescu Statue
- Hommage à Mihai Eminescu, poète roumain (French)
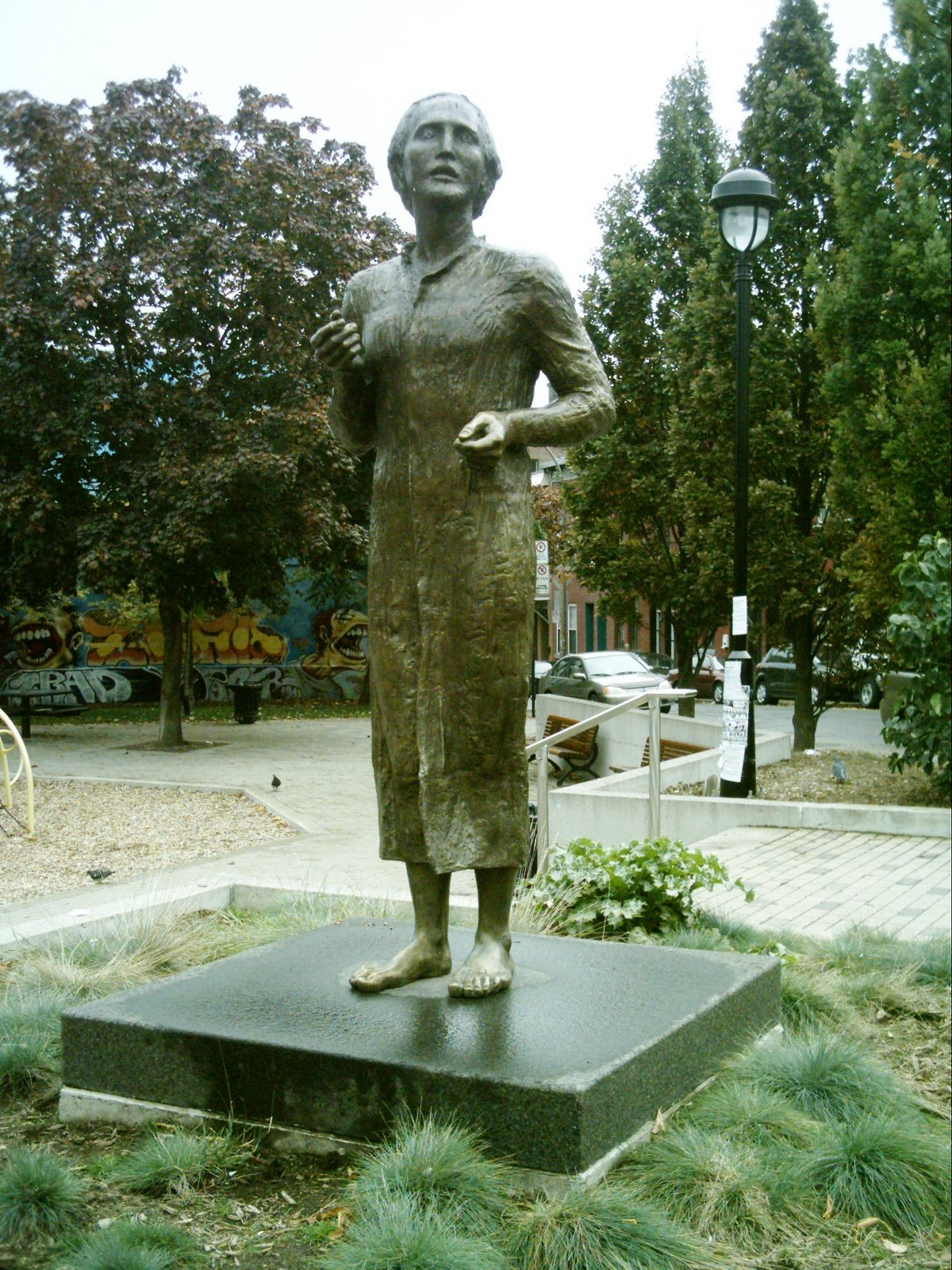
- Interactive map of Mihai Eminescu Statue
- Location: Romania Square, Montreal
- Designer: Vasile Gorduz
- Material: Bronze
- Beginning date: 2000
- Opening date: September 19, 2004
- Dedicated to: Mihai Eminescu

The Mihai Eminescu Statue (French: Hommage à Mihai Eminescu, poète roumain) is a monument in the Plateau-Mont-Royal area of Montreal, Quebec, Canada.

The monument to Mihai Eminescu by Vasile Gorduz was unveiled on September 19, 2004. The event also marked the celebration of 100 years of Romanian presence in Canada and 35 years of Canadian-Romanian relations. The statue is located in Place de la Roumanie (Romania Square), in a small park located between rue Sewell, rue Clark, rue St. Cuthbert and Avenue des Pins.

== See also ==
- Romanian Canadians
