= Exaltación =

Exaltación may refer to several places in Bolivia:

- Exaltación, Mamoré in Beni Department
- Exaltación, Vaca Diéz, Beni Department
- Exaltación Municipality, Yacuma Province, Beni Department

== See also ==
- Exalt (disambiguation)
