= War Memorial of Montreal West =

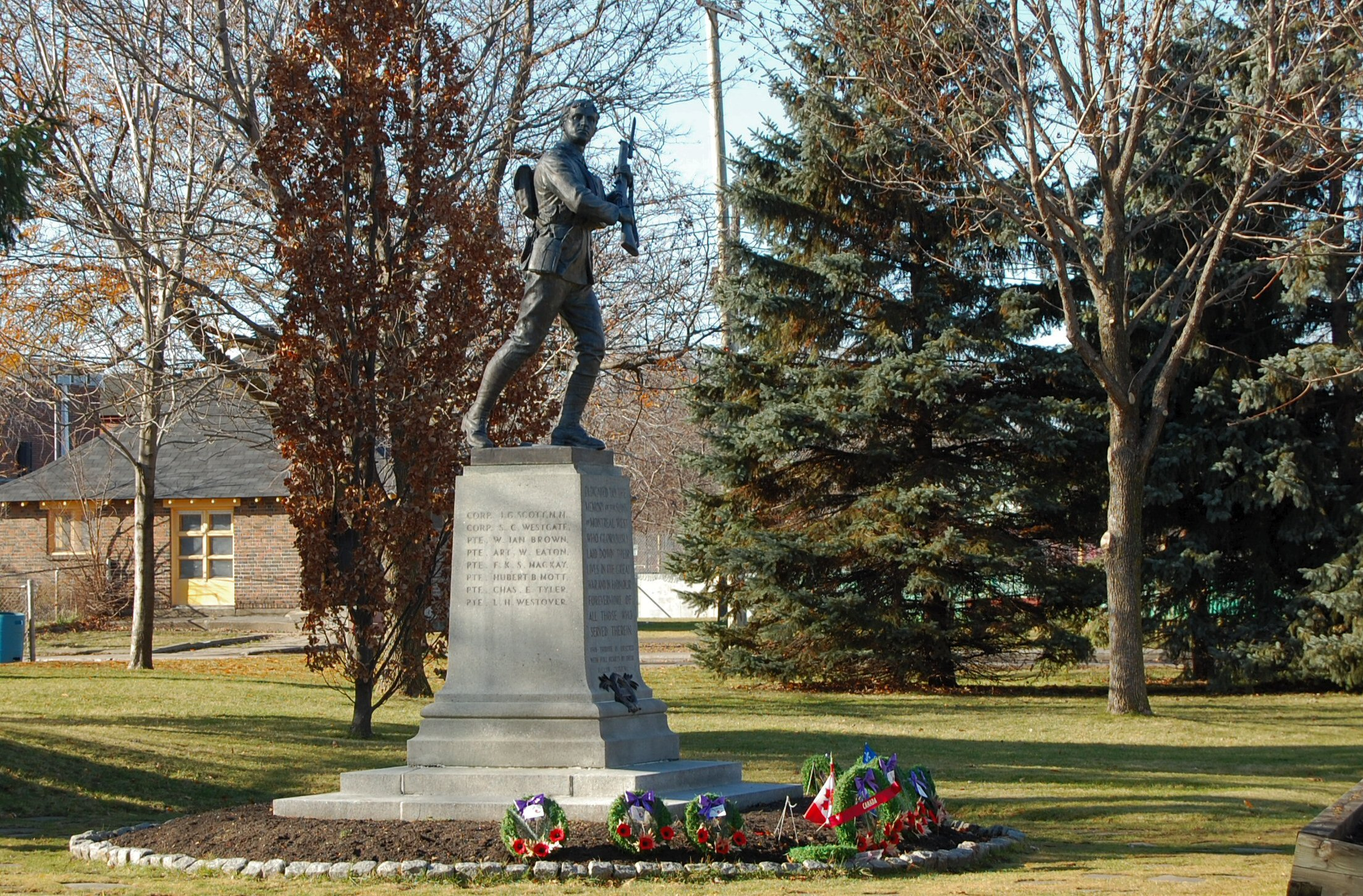
- Interactive map of War Memorial of Montreal West
- Location: Montreal
- Coordinates: 45°27′5.78″N 073°38′34.28″W
- Designer: G.W. Hill
- Type: Monument
- Material: gray granite, bronze
- Opening date: 1921
- Dedicated to: death combatants in the Great War (World War I)

The War Memorial of Montreal West is a monument located in Montreal West, Quebec, Canada, It is situated beside the city hall in Memorial Park, on Westminster Avenue near Ainslie Road. Sculpted by George William Hill, the monument features a soldier going into battle and is made of a granite base. Behind the statue is a wall of remembrance for the heroes of World War I and World War II.
