= Statue of Marie-Victorin Kirouac =

Sculpture in Montreal, Quebec, Canada

Marie-Victorin Statue
- Monument au Frère Marie-Victorin
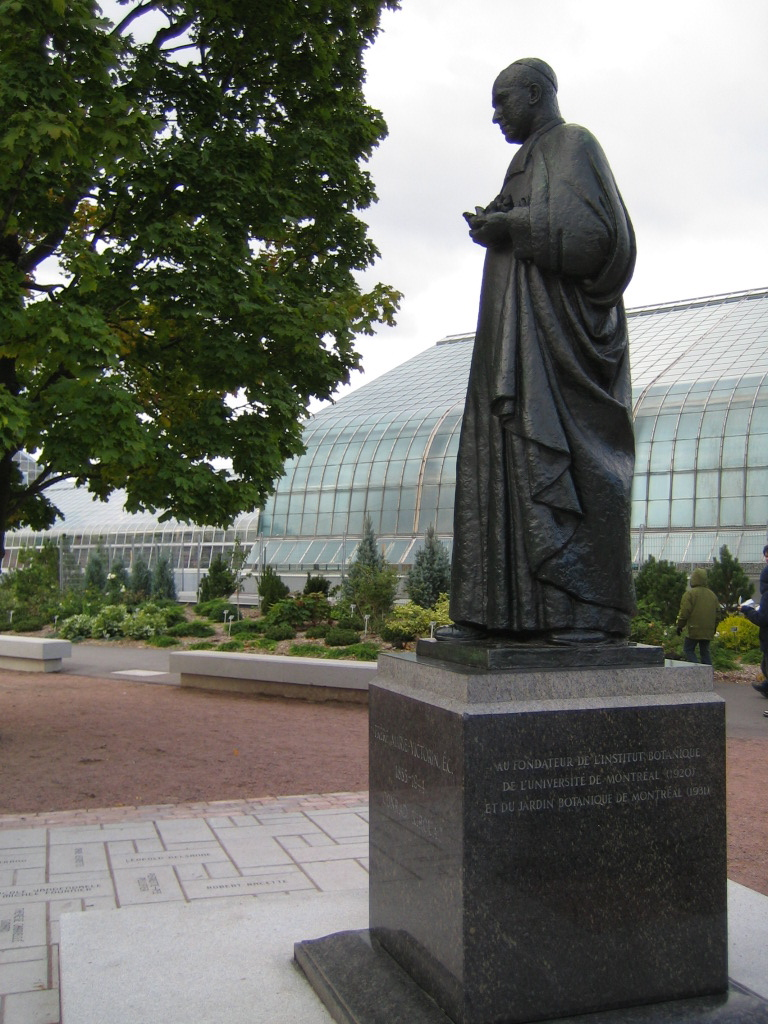
- Interactive map of Marie-Victorin Statue
- Location: Montreal Botanical Garden
- Coordinates: 45.5572°N 73.5559°W
- Designer: Sylvia Daoust
- Material: Bronze, Granite
- Opening date: September 18, 1954
- Dedicated to: Brother Marie-Victorin)

The Marie-Victorin Statue (French: Monument au Frère Marie-Victorin, pronounced [mɔnymɑ̃ o fʁɛʁ maʁi viktɔʁɛ̃]), created by Sylvia Daoust, is a monument in the Botanical Garden of Montreal, Quebec, Canada. The monument to Brother Marie-Victorin (Marie-Victorin Kirouac) was unveiled by Maurice Duplessis and Paul-Émile Léger on September 18, 1954.

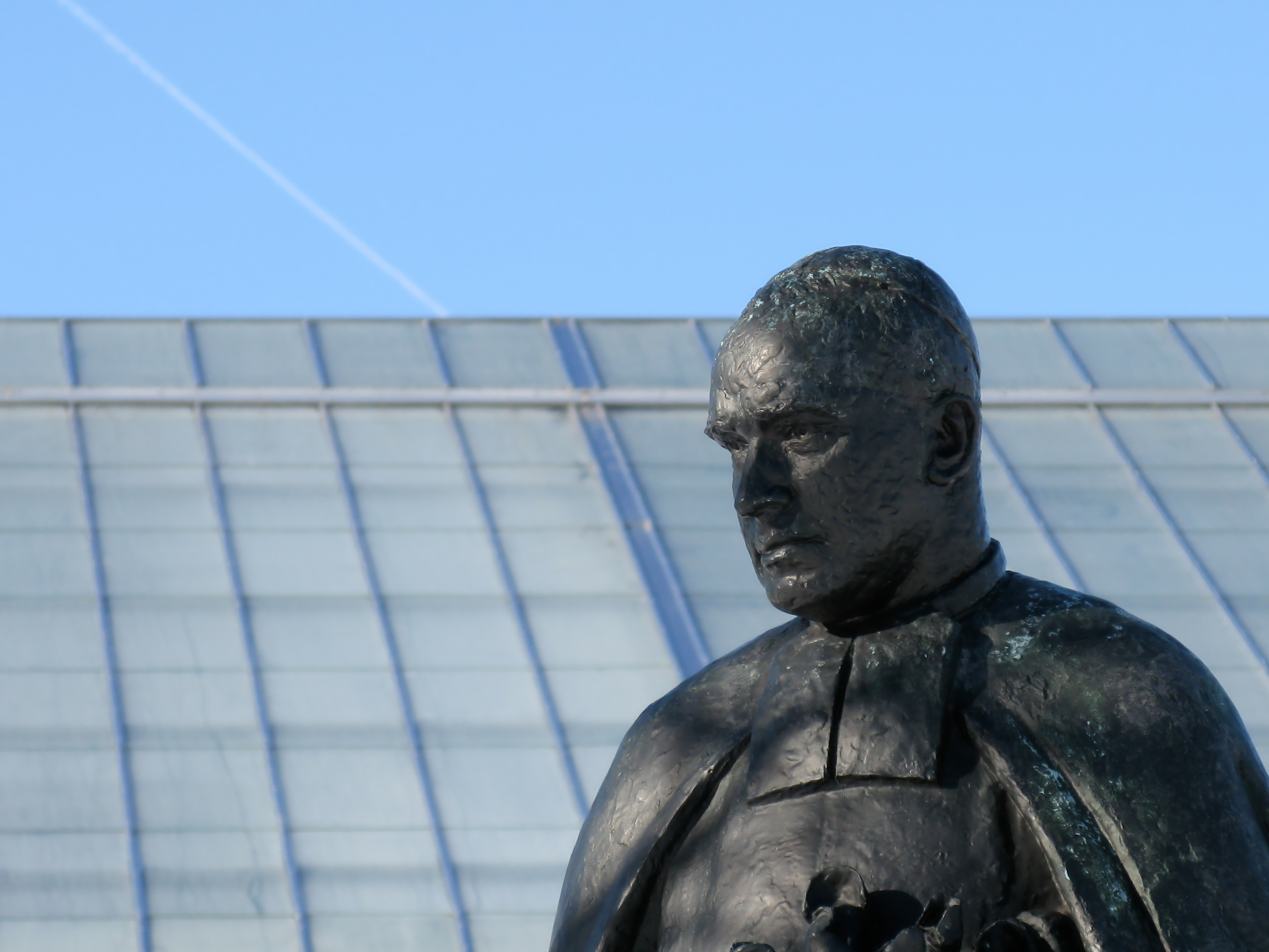
