= Statue of Jean Drapeau =

Sculpture in Montreal, Quebec, Canada

Monument à Jean Drapeau
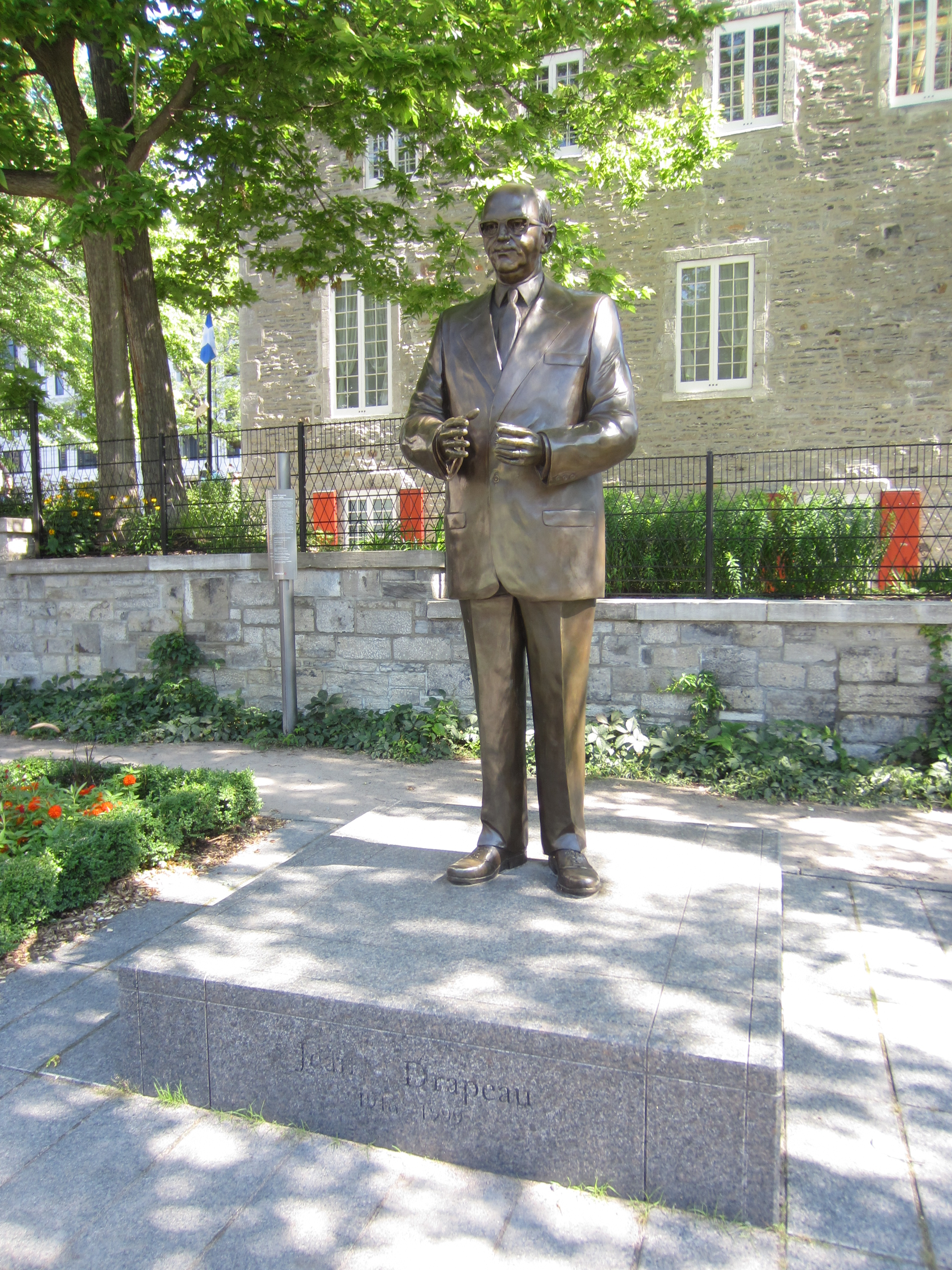
- The statue in 2017
- Artist: Annick Bourgeau
- Year: 2001
- Medium: Bronze sculpture
- Subject: Jean Drapeau
- Location: Montreal, Quebec, Canada; 45°30′31″N 73°33′12″W

A 2001 bronze statue of Montreal Mayor Jean Drapeau (French: Monument à Jean Drapeau) by Annick Bourgeau is installed in Montreal's Place de la Dauversière, in Quebec, Canada.
