= Cactus modulaire =

1986 bronze sculpture by Robert Roussil

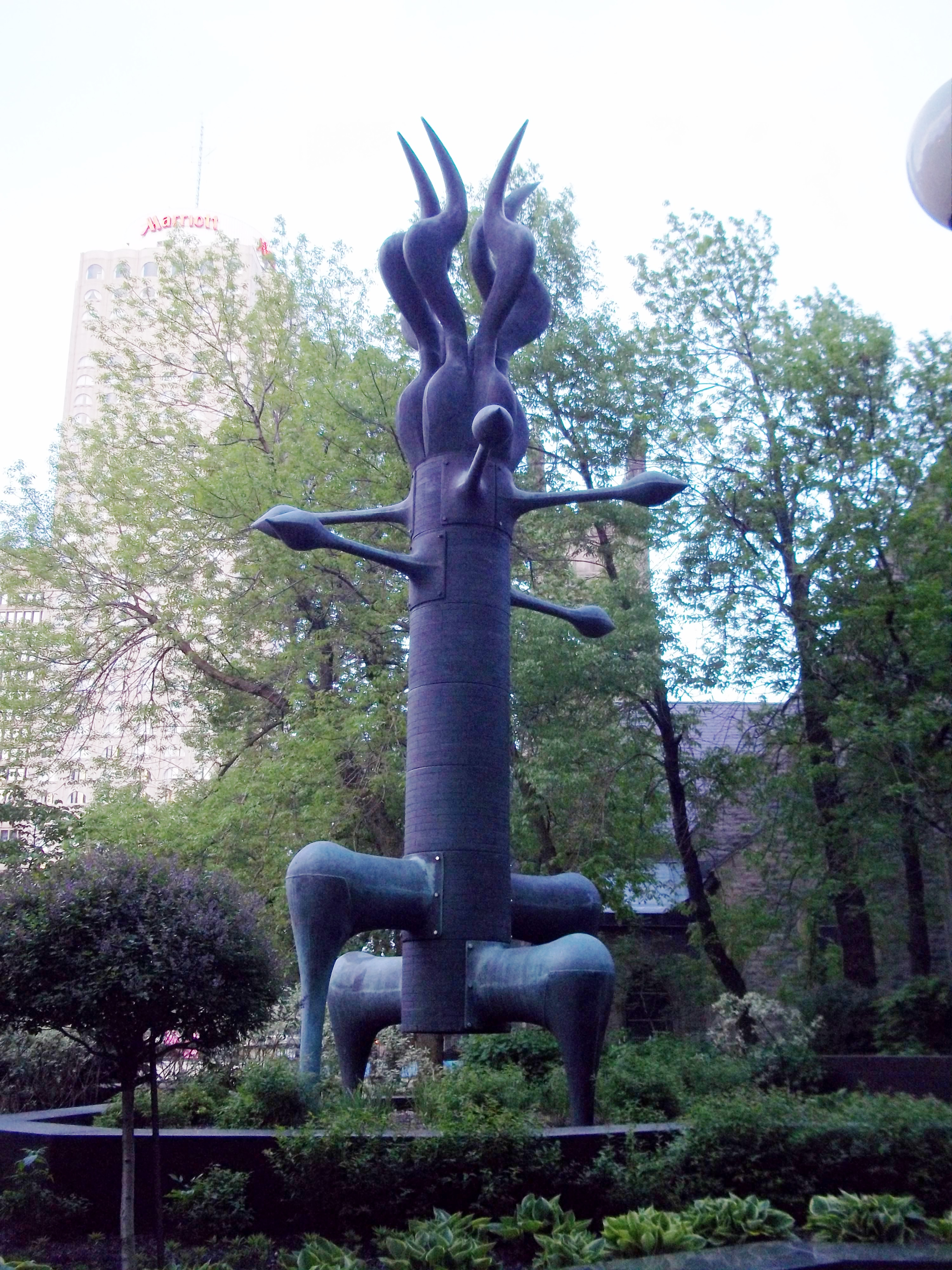
- The sculpture in 2012
- Artist: Robert Roussil
- Year: 1986
- Medium: Bronze and beryllium alloy
- Dimensions: 10 m × 3 m (390 in × 120 in)
- Weight: 6,500 kilograms (14,300 lb)
- Location: Montreal, Quebec, Canada; 45°29′53″N 73°34′11″W

Cactus modulaire is a 1986 outdoor bronze sculpture by Robert Roussil, installed in Montreal, Quebec, Canada. It is situated next to the La Laurentienne Building in Downtown Montreal. The sculpture weighs 6,500 kilograms (14,300 lb) and is composed of a bronze and beryllium alloy, cast in the Lafeuille foundry in Nogent-sur-Oise, France.

== See also ==
- 1986 in art
