= Monument aux braves de N.D.G. =

- Interactive map of Monument aux braves de N.D.G.
- Location: Notre-Dame-de-Grâce Park
- Coordinates: 45.4725°N 73.6137°W
- Designer: David Estrom
- Type: Monument
- Material: gray granite, bronze
- Height: 4 metres (13 ft)
- Opening date: 1919
- Dedicated to: Combatants killed in World War I, World War II, Korean War

The Monument aux braves de N.D.G. is a war memorial in the Montreal neighbourhood Notre-Dame-de-Grâce. The work of sculptor David Estrom (1919), it stands in the middle of Notre-Dame-de-Grâce Park, commemorating the combatants who died during World War I, World War II, and the Korean War. On a circular grey granite base sits a column decorated with a bronze plate which represents a battalion moving, bayonets leading.
