= Marguerite Bourgeoys Park =

Urban park in Montreal, Canada

- Parc Marguerite-Bourgeoys
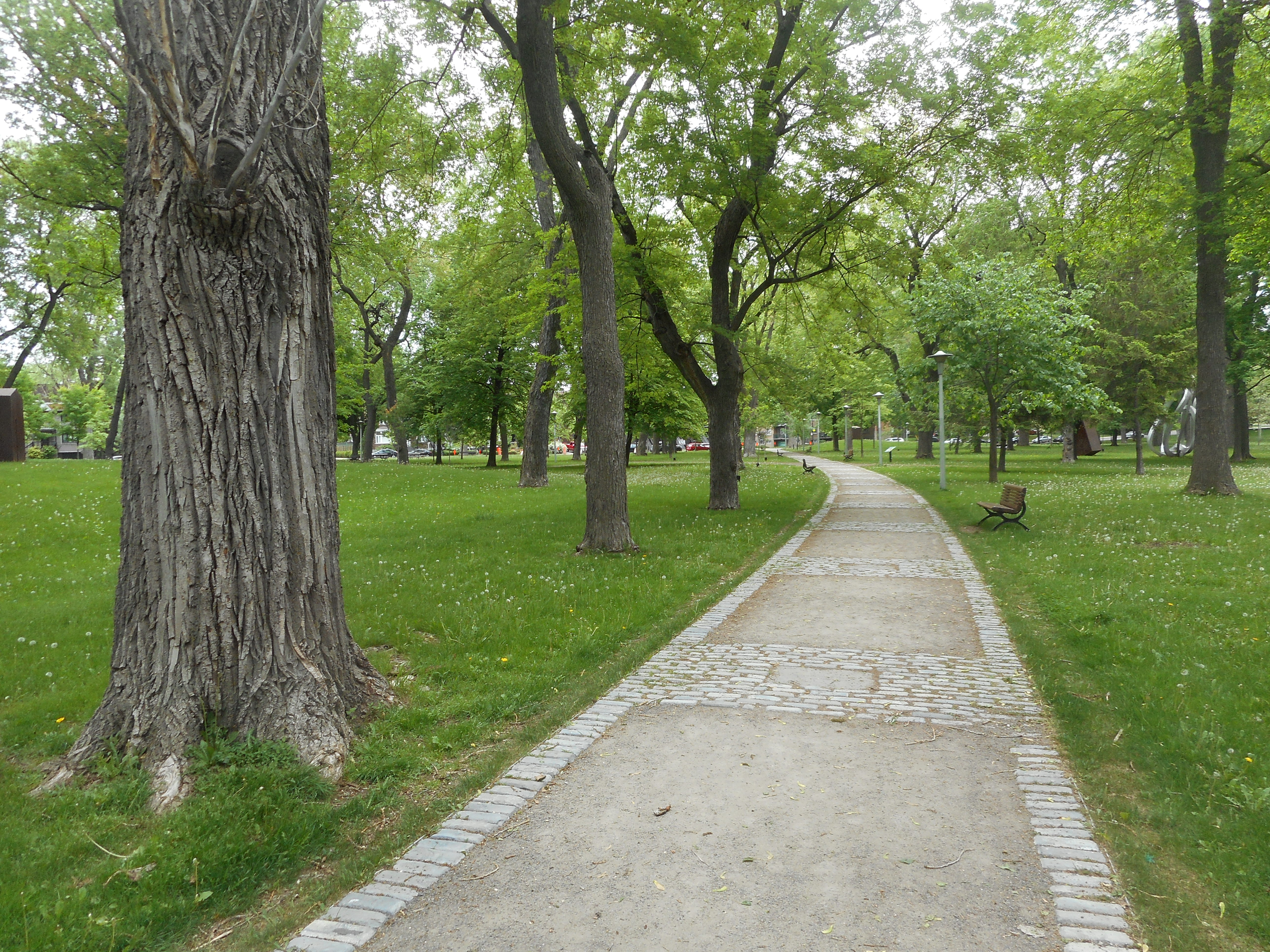
- A path in the park

- Location within Montreal
- Type: Urban park
- Location: Pointe-Saint-Charles, Le Sud-Ouest in Montreal, Quebec, Canada
- Coordinates: 45°28′29.98″N 73°33′31.96″W
- Created: 1910
- Operator: City of Montreal
- Open: 6:00 a.m to 11:00 p.m.
- Status: Open all year
- Public transit: STM Bus: 57, 61, 71
- Website: Parc Marguerite-Bourgeoys

Marguerite Bourgeoys Park (French: Parc Marguerite-Bourgeoys) is a park in the Pointe-Saint-Charles neighbourhood of the Le Sud-Ouest borough of Montreal, Quebec, Canada. It is bordered by du Parc Marguerite-Bourgeoys Street to the north and east, des Filles du Roy Street to the south, and Wellington Street to the west.

The park was created in 1910. It initially was named Monahan Park. It was renamed Marguerite Bourgeoys Park in 1922.

The park is named for Marguerite Bourgeoys, the French founder of the Congregation of Notre Dame of Montreal in the colony of New France (present-day Quebec). She has been declared a Saint by the Catholic Church.

== Art ==
=== Le Village imaginé. «Le Renard l’emporte, le suit à la trace…» ===
Le Village imaginé. «Le Renard l’emporte, le suit à la trace…»
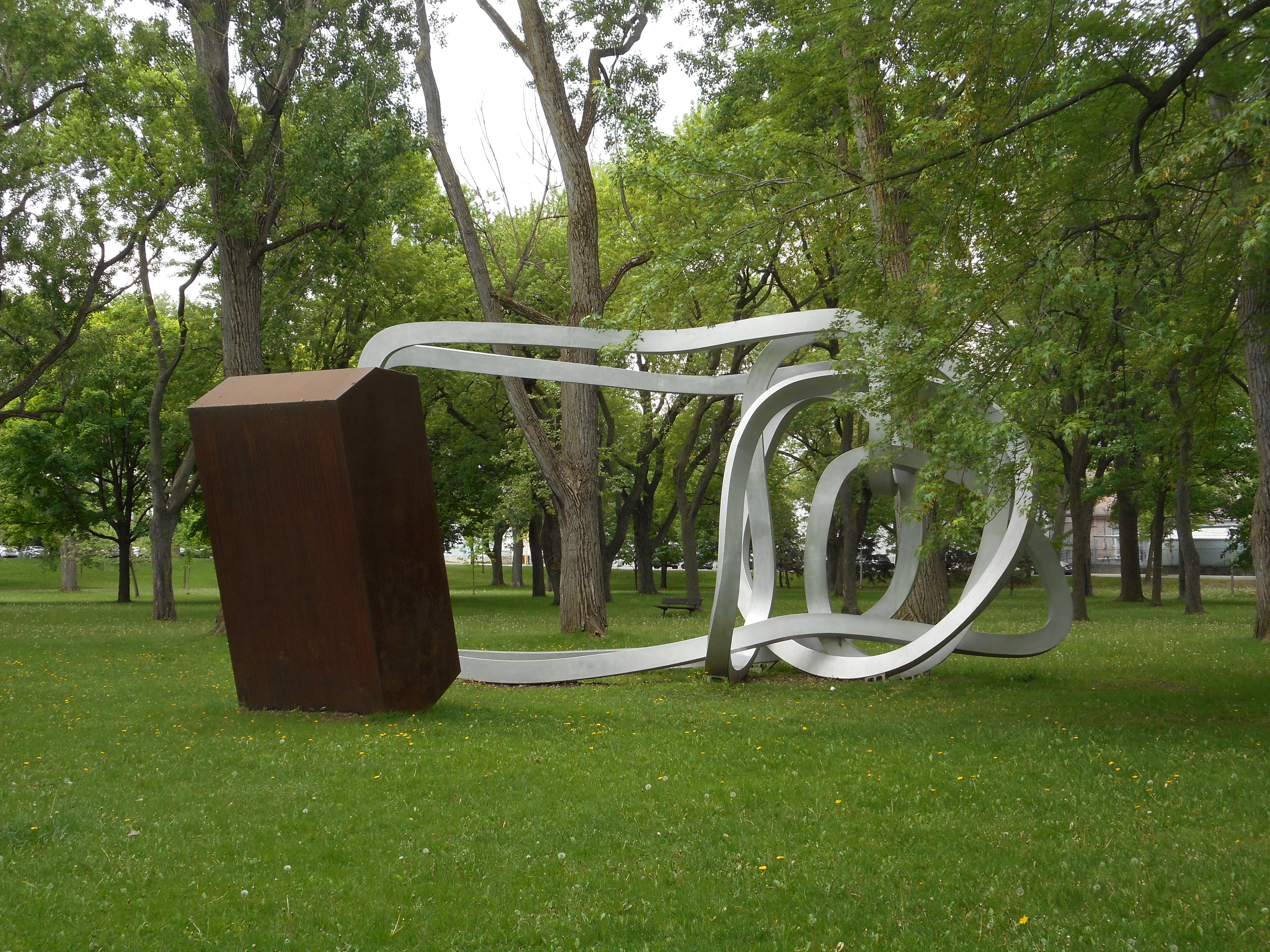
- Artist: Pierre Bourgault
- Completion date: 2005
- Medium: Sculpture
- Dimensions: 98 m × 115 m (3,900 in × 4,500 in)
- Location: Pointe-Saint-Charles, Le Sud-Ouest, Montreal, Quebec, Canada
- Owner: City of Montreal

The City of Montreal commissioned a sculpture for the park, created by Pierre Bourgault. Le Village imaginé. «Le Renard l’emporte, le suit à la trace…» is composed of five elements set in various parts of the park.
