= Statue of Howie Morenz =

Sculpture in Montreal, Quebec, Canada

Howie Morenz
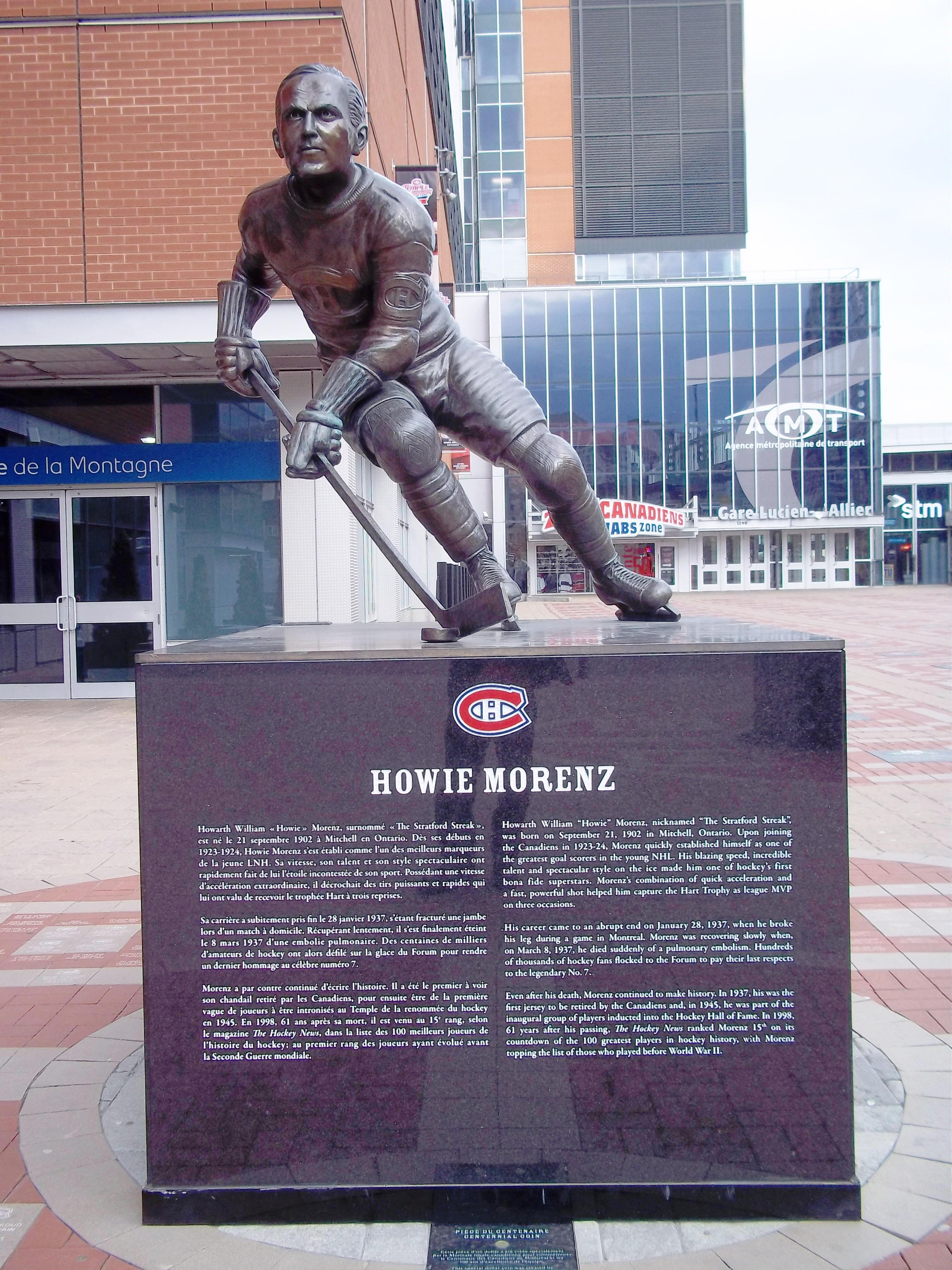
- The statue in 2012
- Subject: Howie Morenz
- Location: Montreal, Quebec, Canada; 45.49646°N 73.56885°W

Howie Morenz is an outdoor sculpture of the Canadian professional ice hockey player of the same name, installed outside Montreal's Bell Centre, in Quebec, Canada.
