= Statue of André Bessette =

Sculpture in Montreal, Canada

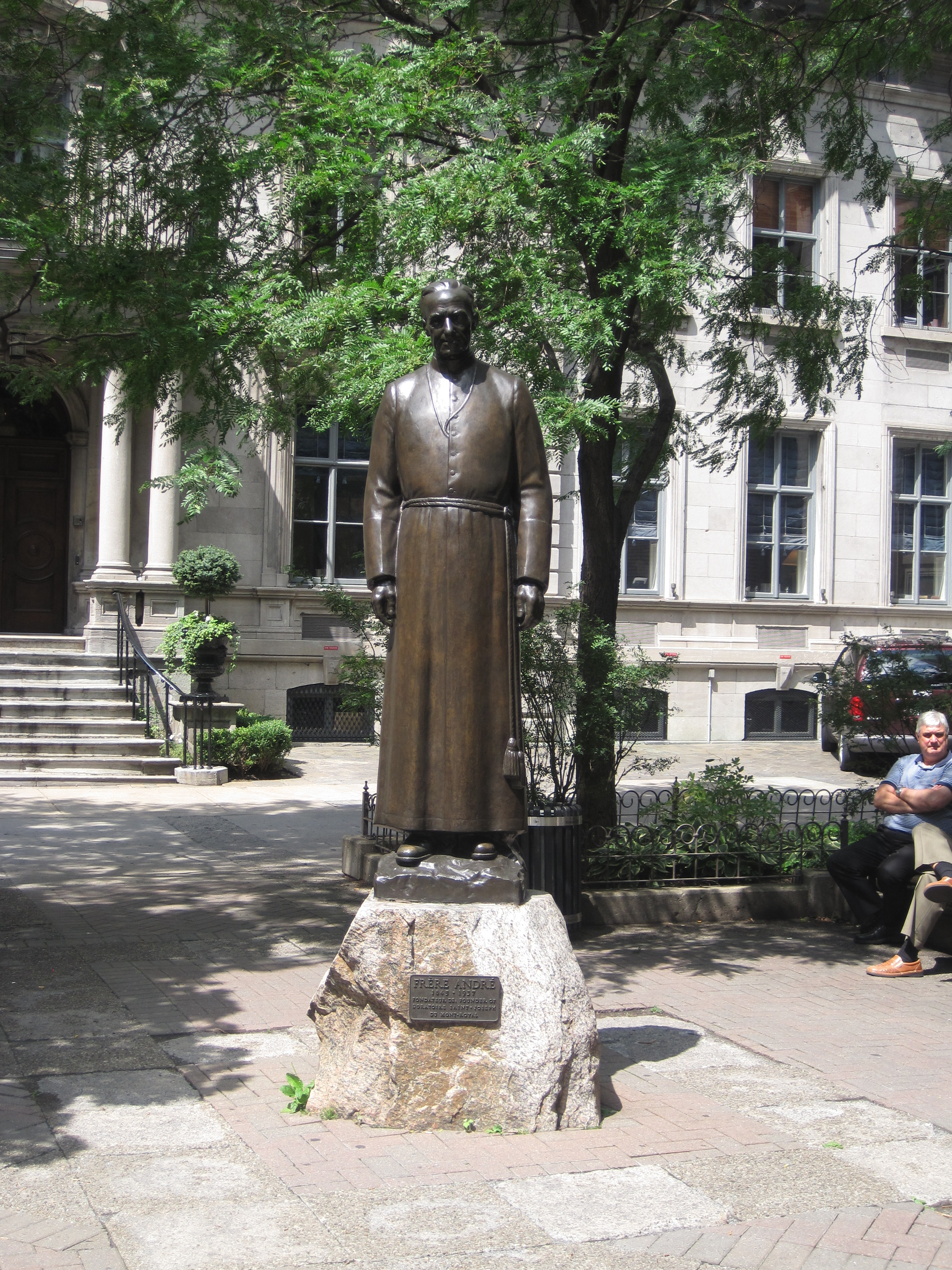
- The statue in 2010
- Artist: Émile Brunet
- Medium: Bronze sculpture
- Subject: André Bessette
- Location: Montreal, Quebec, Canada; 45°30′12″N 73°34′00″W

The Statue of André Bessette (French: Monument au Frère André) is an outdoor bronze sculpture in Place du frère Andre, Montreal, Quebec, Canada. The monument is of André Bessette, more commonly known as Brother André (French: Frère André), and since his canonization as Saint André. The statue was created by Canadian sculptor Émile Brunet. It was inaugurated on November 2, 1986, in the presence of Mayor Jean Drapeau. The statue is a minor tourist attraction to visitors from abroad.
