= Angel of Victory =

- L'Ange de la Victoire (French)
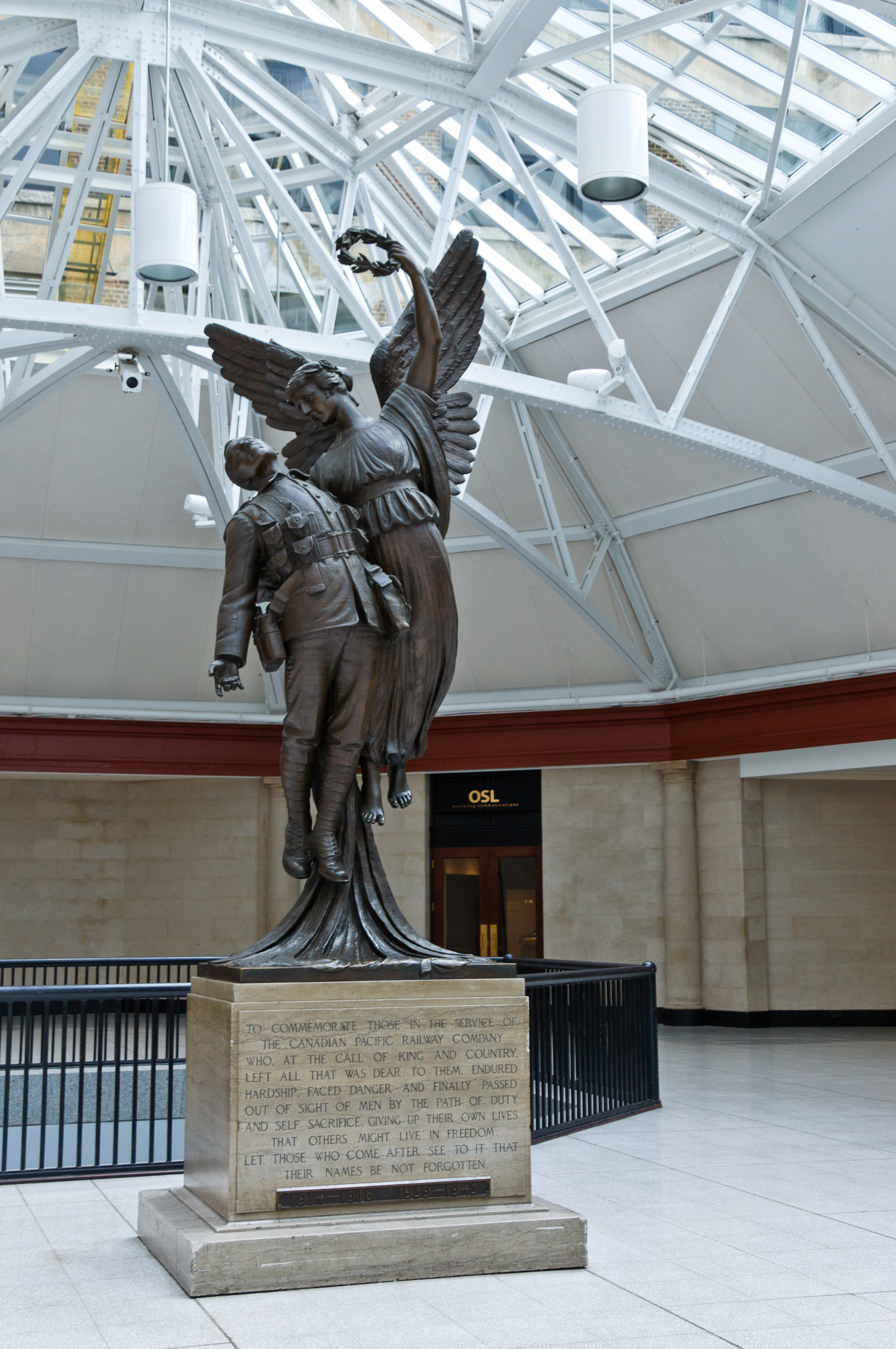
- The statue in 2011
- Artist: Coeur de Lion McCarthy
- Year: 1922
- Completion date: 1922
- Medium: Bronze sculpture
- Location: Montreal, Quebec, Canada; 45.4972°N 73.5689°W
- Owner: Cadillac Fairview

The Angel of Victory (French: L'Ange de la Victoire) is a statue crafted by London-born sculptor Coeur de Lion McCarthy (1881–1979), installed in Montreal's Windsor Station, in Quebec, Canada. It was commissioned in 1922 in memory of the 1,116 Canadian Pacific Railway (CPR) employees who died in World War I. Copies of the statue were also installed at CPR stations in Vancouver and Winnipeg, Canada. The Winnipeg copy has since been moved from the station, and is now located outside the Deer Lodge Hospital.

The bronze, seven foot tall statue shows a fallen soldier being carried up to heaven by a female angel. It is on a pedestal inscribed:

To Commemorate Those in the Service of the Canadian Pacific Railway Company Who at the Call of King and Country, Left All That Was Dear to Them, Endured Hardship, Faced Danger and Finally Passed Out of Sight of Men by the Path of Duty and Self Sacrifice, Giving Up Their Own Lives That Others May Live in Freedom. Let Those Who Come After See to It That Their Names Are Not Forgotten. / 1914–1918

After World War II, the years 1939–1945 were added to the inscription.

== Art inspired by the statue ==
The Vancouver copy of the statue was used in a piece by Canadian street artist Richard Hambleton, who had instructed that it be released only after his death, in 2017. Created in 1974, the piece depicts the young artist in place of the fallen soldier, his body pierced by paintbrushes.

== See also ==
- 1922 in art
