= John Young Monument =

Sculpture by Louis-Philippe Hébert

- Monument à John Young
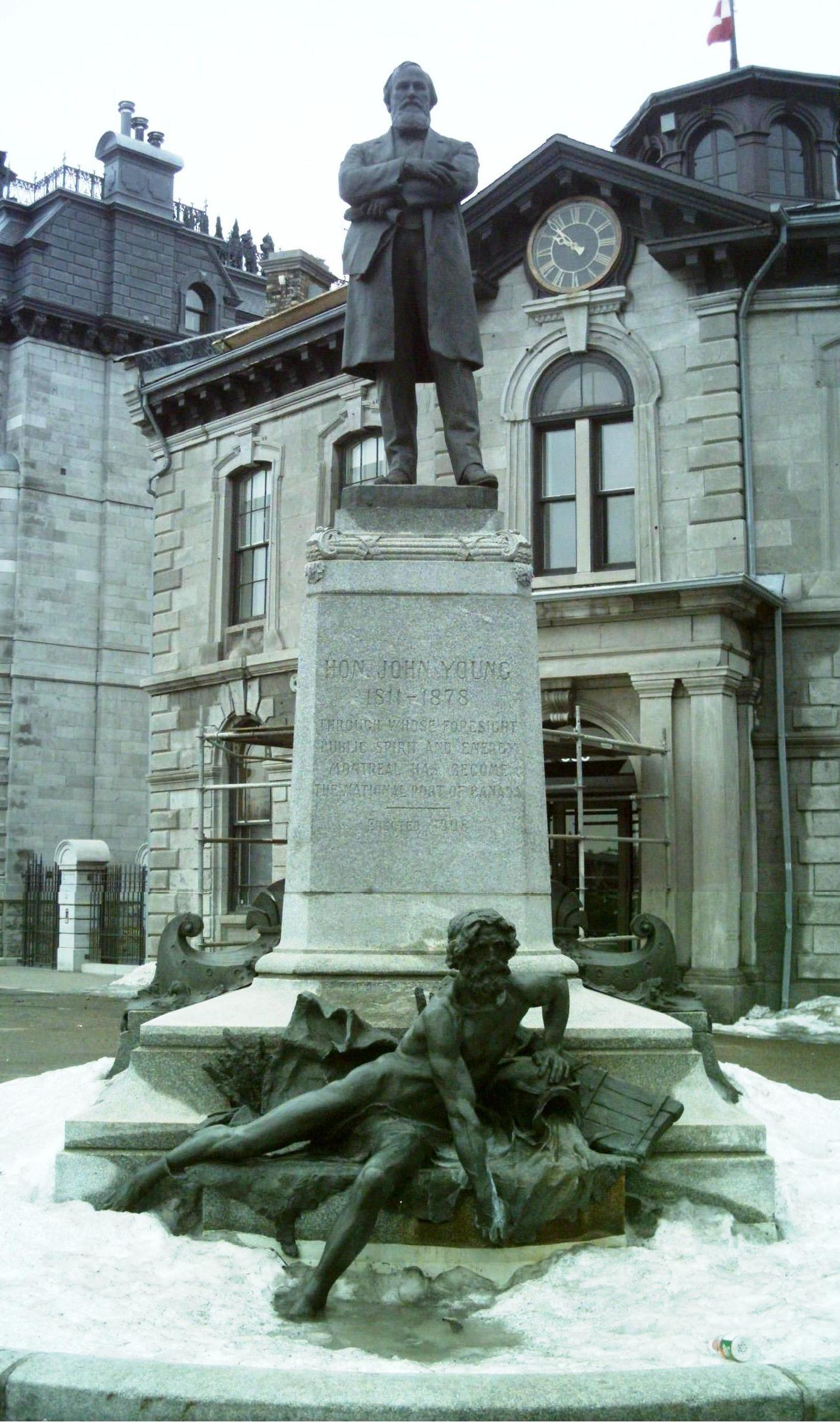
- Interactive map of John Young Monument
- Location: 333 Street de la Commune West
- Coordinates: 45°30′00″N 73°33′12″W
- Designer: Louis-Philippe Hébert
- Type: Historical Monument
- Material: Bronze on stone pedestal
- Width: 2.75 metres (9.0 ft)
- Height: 2.9 metres (9.5 ft)
- Beginning date: 1908
- Opening date: October 4, 1911
- Dedicated to: John Young

The John Young Monument (French: Monument à John Young) is a monument of Canadian politician John Young by sculptor Louis-Philippe Hébert. It is located at the Old Port of Montreal, where Young was the first Chairman of the Port Commission.

== Overview ==
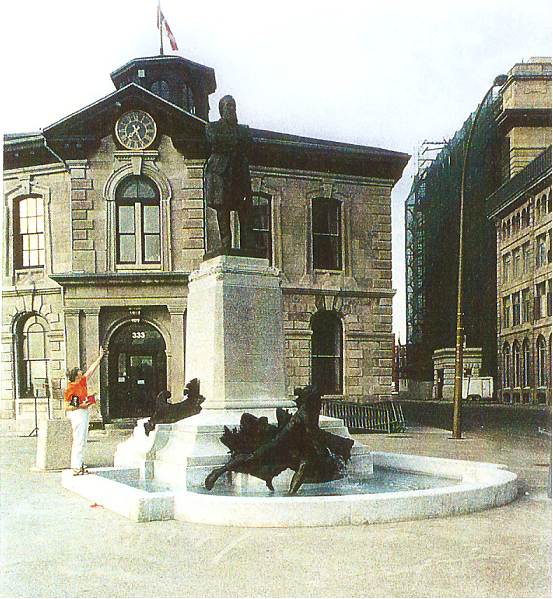
The monument

This monument in memory of John Young was erected in front of the port in 1908, on the initiative of the John Young Memorial Committee. It was moved to its current location in front of the Allan Building on rue de la Commune at Saint-Pierre in 1997. John Young was the first Chairman of the Port Commission, responsible for enlarging and developing the port. His efforts were so important that after his death in 1878, he was considered to be the "father" of the port. A figure of Neptune, symbolically representing the St. Lawrence River, sits at the base of the monument.

Louis-Philippe Hébert sculpted the figures in 1895.

This monument in memory of John Young was unveiled on October 4, 1911, the year of the hundredth birthday of John Young.
