= Athena Park =

Urban park in Montreal, Canada

- Parc Athéna
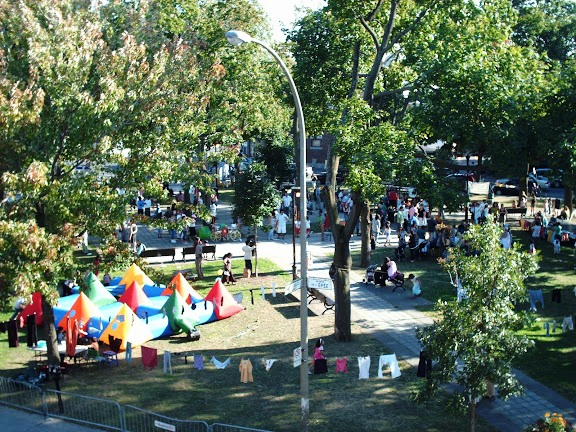
- Neighborhood party on the occasion of the 25th anniversary of the Coopérative Nos Rêves, in 2007.

- Location within Montreal
- Type: Urban park
- Location: Park Extension, Villeray–Saint-Michel–Parc-Extension, Montreal, Quebec, Canada
- Coordinates: 45°31′40.05″N 73°37′27.42″W
- Operator: City of Montreal
- Open: 6:00 a.m to 11:00 p.m.
- Status: Open all year
- Public transit: STM Métro: Parc; STM Bus: 16, 92, 179
- Website: Parc Athéna

Athena Park (French: Parc Athéna) is a small park in the Park Extension neighborhood of the Villeray–Saint-Michel–Parc-Extension borough of Montreal, Quebec, Canada. It occupies a quadrilateral bounded by Jean Talon Street, Bloomfield Street, de l'Épée Avenue, and Greenshields Street. It was named in honor of the ancient Greek goddess Athena, by the City of Montreal in 1986.

== Art ==
=== Athéna ===
Athéna
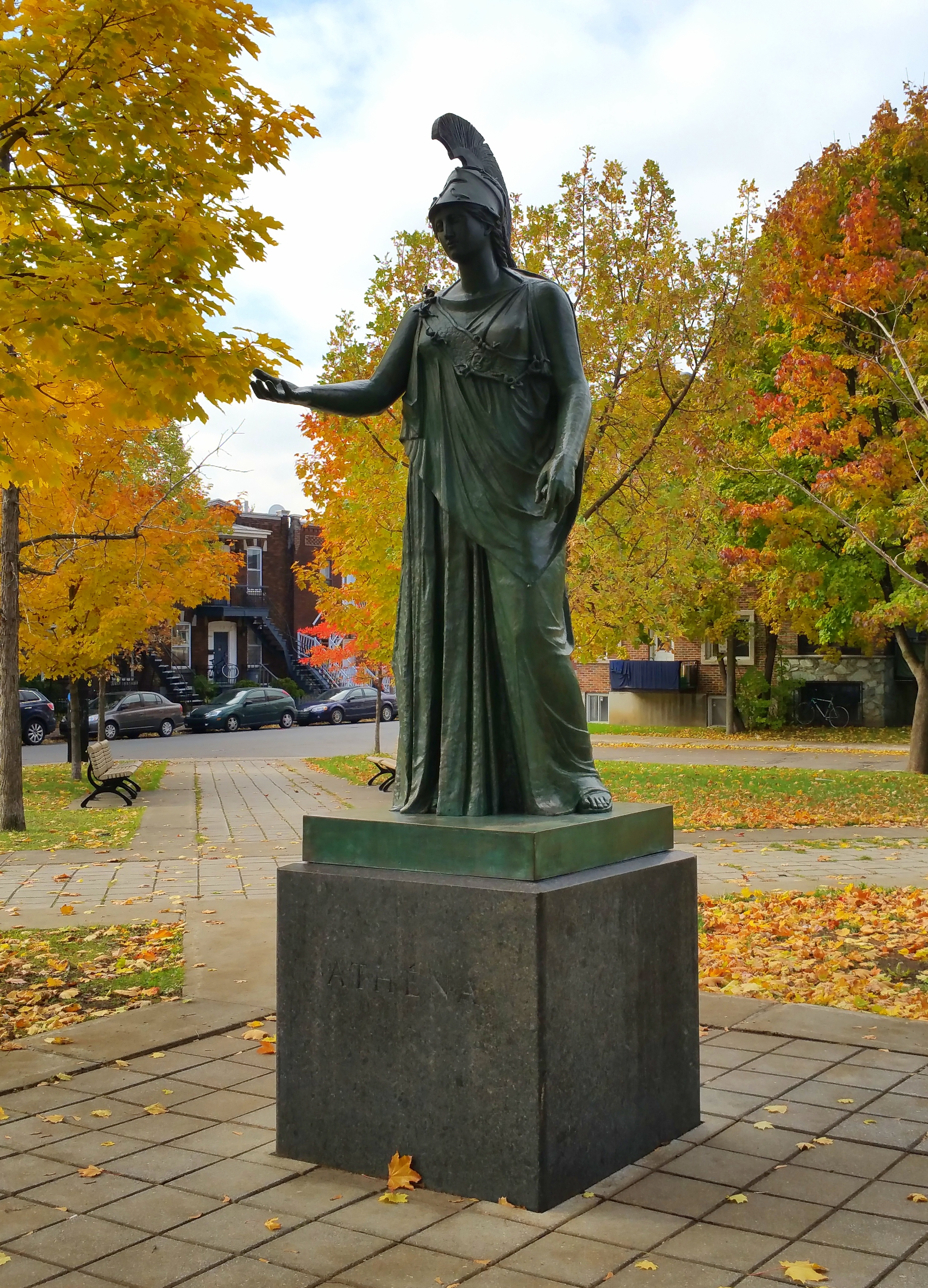
- Artist: Spyros Gokakis
- Year: 1997
- Completion date: 1997
- Medium: Sculpture
- Subject: Ancient Greek goddess Athena
- Dimensions: 310 cm × 100 cm × 100 cm (120 in × 39 in × 39 in)
- Location: Park Extension, Villeray–Saint-Michel–Parc-Extension, Montreal, Quebec, Canada
- Owner: City of Montreal
- Accession: 1 March 2000

In 2000, Athéna, a reproduction of a statue of the ancient Greek goddess of art and wisdom Athena, was installed in the center of the park "in homage to the Greek immigrants who came to settle in Canada and in particular in the district". It was created by the sculptor Spyros Gokakis, using an iron cast in the cire perdue method. It was presented as a gift to Montreal by the mayor of Athens, on the occasion of the celebration of independence of Greece, to underline the friendship ties that link the two cities.

The sculpture has Athena dressed in a draped robe and an aegis ornamented with serpents. Her right hand is extended in front of her, the palm turned upward. Her traditional Corinthian helmet is tipped back on her head, revealing her face.
