= Fenêtre sur l'avenir =

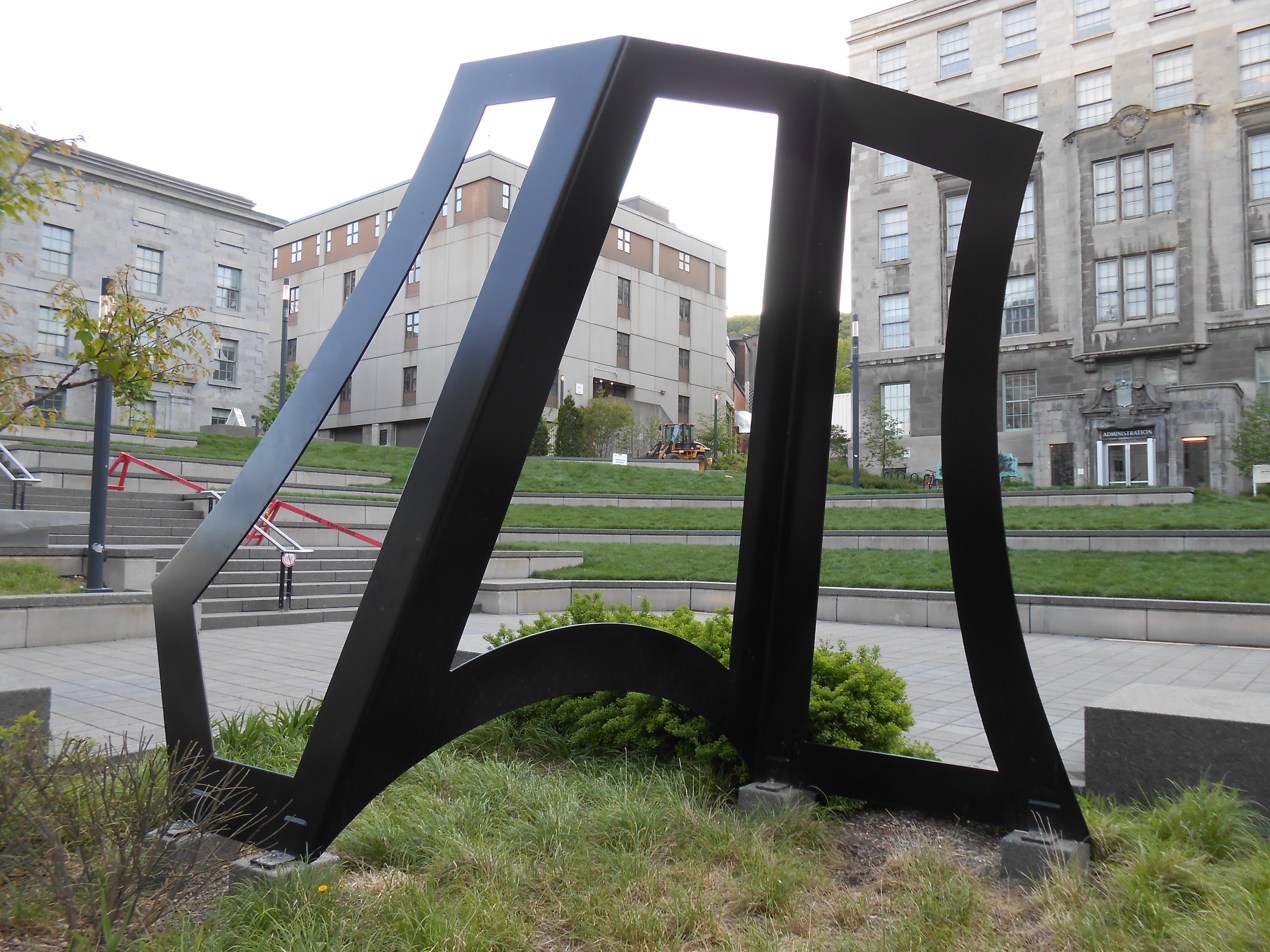
- The sculpture in 2013
- Artist: Marcel Barbeau
- Year: 1992
- Medium: Sculpture
- Location: Montreal, Quebec, Canada; 45°30′21″N 73°34′37″W

Fenêtre sur l'avenir is a 1992 outdoor steel sculpture by Marcel Barbeau, installed at Montreal's McGill University, in Quebec, Canada.
