= Les chuchoteuses =

2002 sculpture by Rose-Aimée Bélanger

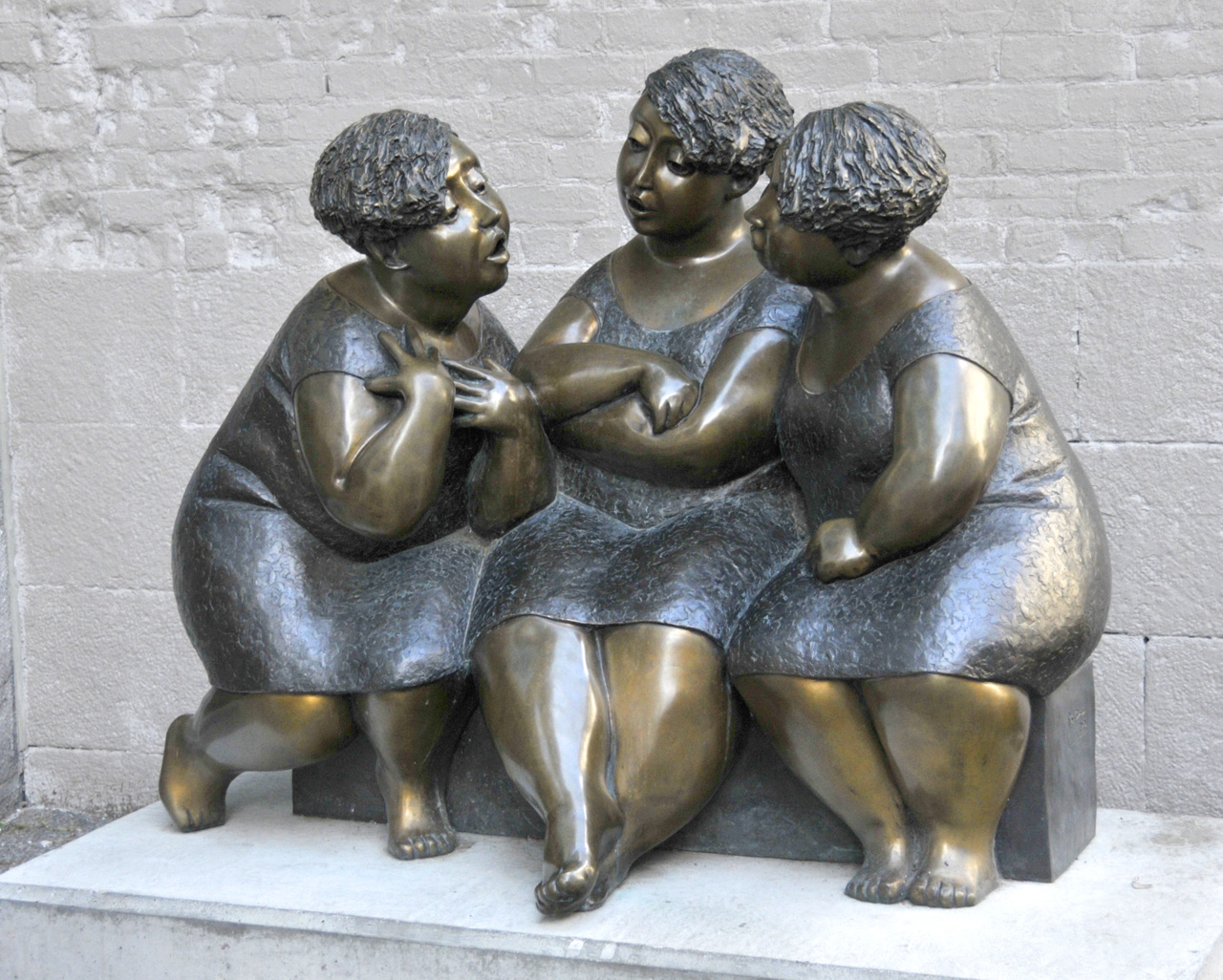
- The sculpture in 2008
- Artist: Rose-Aimée Bélanger
- Year: 2002
- Medium: Bronze sculpture
- Location: Montreal, Quebec, Canada; 45°30′19″N 73°33′15″W

Les chuchoteuses ("The Gossipers") is a 2002 bronze outdoor sculpture by Rose-Aimée Bélanger installed along Montreal's Rue Saint-Paul, in Quebec, Canada, owned by the commercial development corporation of Old Montreal (La Société de développement commercial du Vieux-Montréal).
