= Les petits Baigneurs =

Monument in Quebec, Canada

Les petits baigneurs
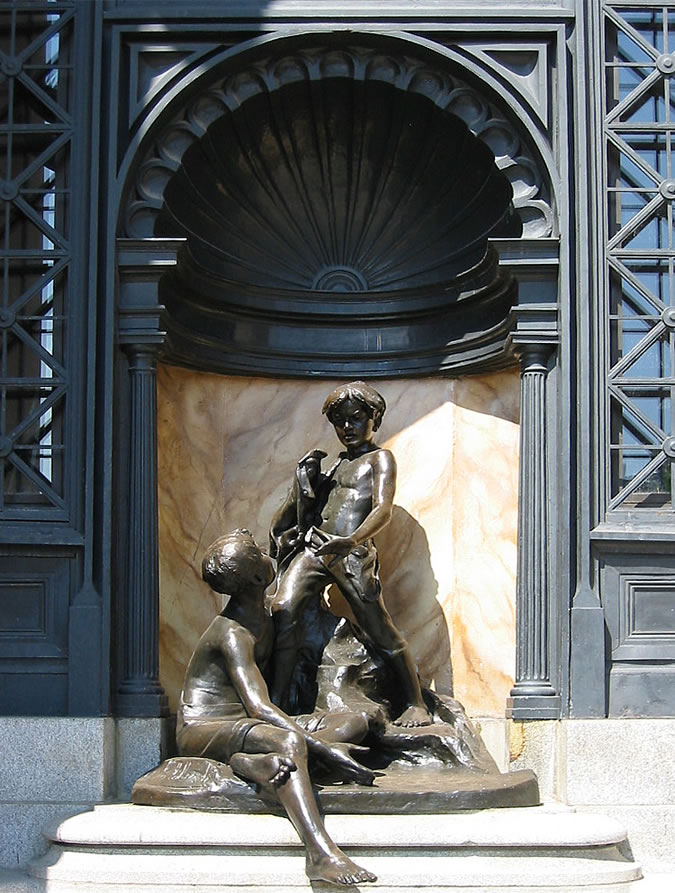
- Interactive map of Les petits baigneurs
- Location: Morgan Boulevard
- Coordinates: 45.5535°N 73.5383°W
- Designer: Alfred Laliberté (1878-1953)
- Type: Monument
- Material: Bronze granite, stone, cast iron
- Width: 1.2 metres (3.9 ft)
- Height: 1.5 metres (4.9 ft)
- Beginning date: 1915
- Opening date: 1916

The Les petits baigneurs is a monument in Montreal, Quebec, Canada. Designed by Alfred Laliberté, it was unveiled in 1916 at the entrance to the Maisonneuve public baths in Montreal. The monument was later restored in 1992. It is on Morgan Avenue, close to the La Fermière monument.

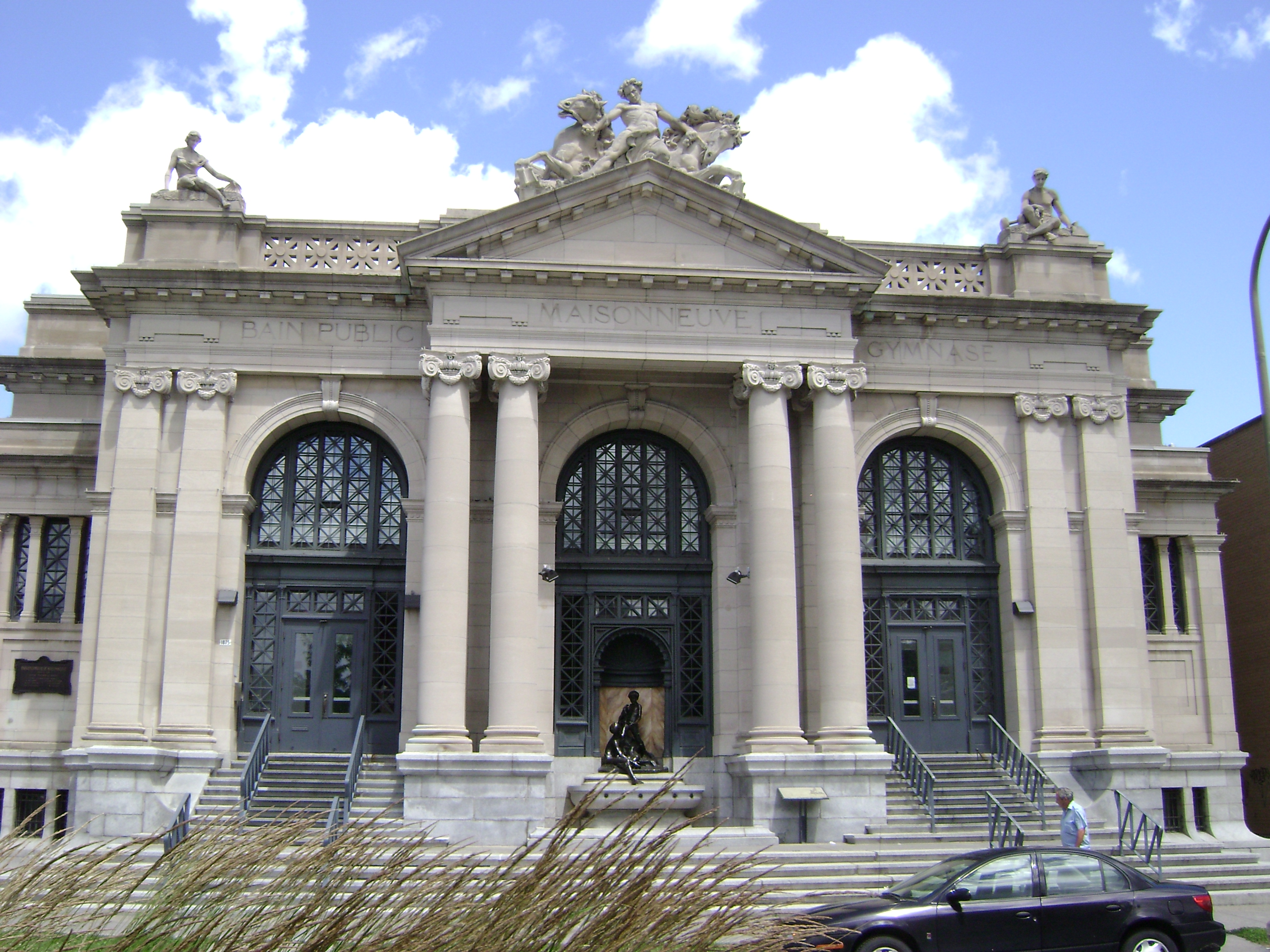
Maisonneuve public baths
