= Enterspace =

Sculpture by Maurice Lemieux

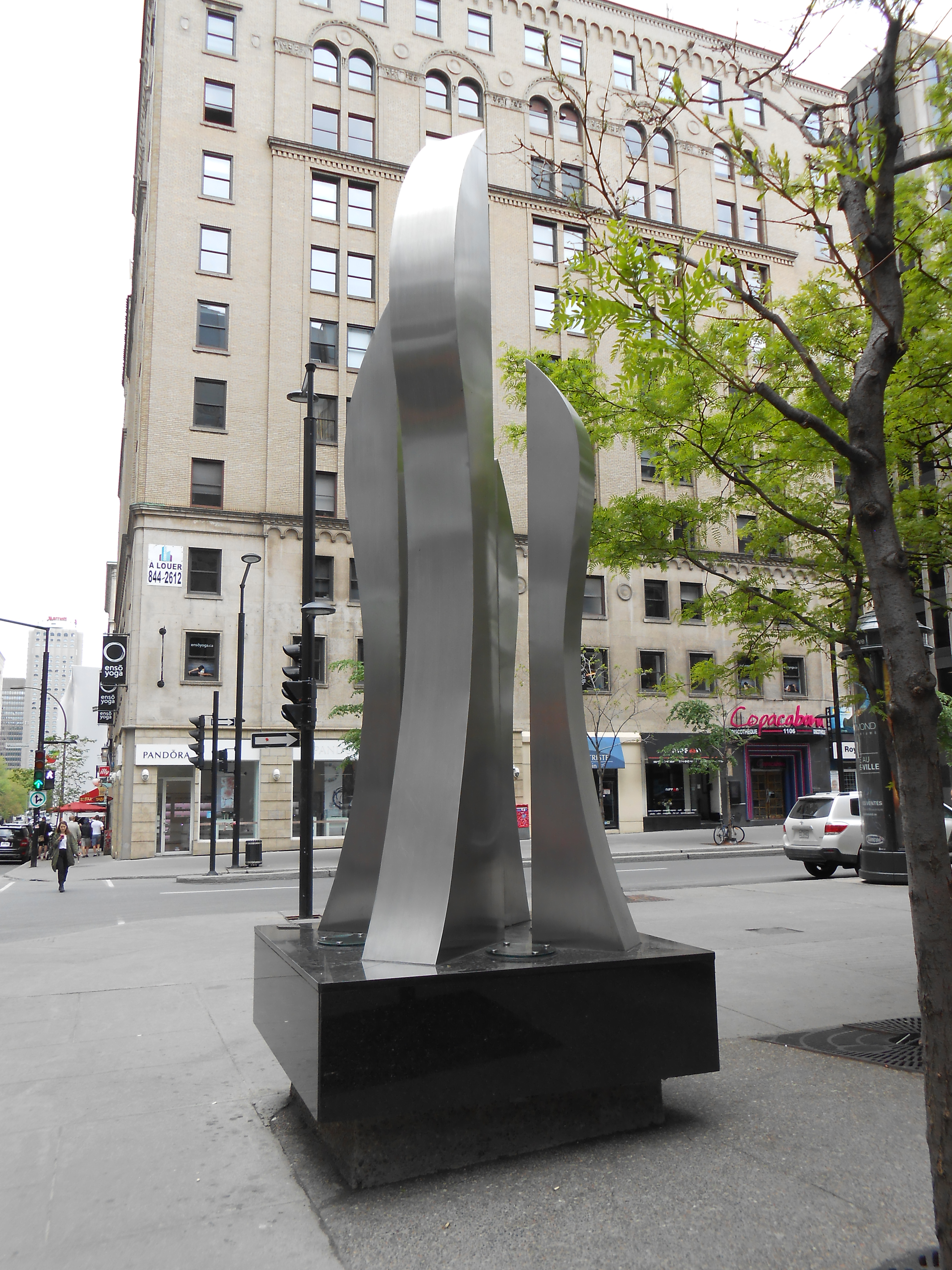
- The sculpture in 2013
- Artist: Maurice Lemieux
- Medium: Stainless steel sculpture
- Location: Montreal, Quebec, Canada
- 45°30′03″N 73°34′30″W

Enterspace is an outdoor stainless steel sculpture by Maurice Lemieux, installed in front of the building at 2000 Peel Street at the corner of De Maisonneuve Boulevard, near Montreal's Peel station exit, in Quebec, Canada.
