= The English Pug and the French Poodle =

2013 sculpture by Marc Andre J. Fortier in Montreal, Quebec, Canada

- The Two Snobs
- Artist: Marc André J. Fortier
- Year: 2013
- Medium: Bronze sculpture (lost-wax casting)
- Dimensions: 300 cm × 81 cm × 81 cm (120 in × 32 in × 32 in)
- Location: Montreal, Quebec, Canada; 45°30′16″N 73°33′27″W

The English Pug and the French Poodle (French: Le Caniche français et le Carlin anglais), also known as The Two Snobs (French: Les deux snobs), is a privately owned outdoor 2013 art installation with two bronze sculptures by the Canadian artist Marc André J. Fortier, installed at 500 Place d'Armes in Montreal, Quebec, Canada.

== Description ==
Standing in the heart of Old Montreal, the diptych evokes, with humour, the cultural discords that used to prevail between the French and English Canadians. Inspired by the historical site of the building, the novel Two Solitudes by Hugh MacLennan and Commedia dell'arte, the artist decided to express in his own way, this historical divide. For this, Fortier has intentionally divided the piece into two clear segments to accentuate the distance between the two parties. Both characters stand on the ground and face away from each other on opposite sides of the building.

On the south side corner of the tower, an Englishman, represented as a thin, elegant, pretentious man, wearing a grid pattern suit with a bow tie, firmly presses against his chest a pug and stares with condescension at the Notre-Dame Basilica, a symbol of the religious dominance of the Catholic Church in Quebec. On the north side corner of the same tower, a Frenchwoman represented as a small, elegant, snooty lady, wearing a Chanel-style suit, rubber-zippered high-heeled shoe covers and an imitation beret, firmly holds against her chest a French Poodle and stares with discontent at the head office of the Bank of Montreal, a symbol of the English power. Both dogs are attracted to each other but are made by their owners to stay away and far apart.

A bronze plate anchored beside each character states the storyline in both languages:

"A dashing looking English man, holding his pug, gives a superior stare at Notre-Dame Basilica, symbol of the religious influence on French Canadians. 210 feet away to the northern corner of the edifice, a woman in Chanel style suit, poodle against her, shoots an offended look to the Bank of Montreal’s head office, symbol of English power. With their masters oblivious to each other, the two dogs on the alert already sniffed out the opportunity to unite. The inspiration for this work was from the Commedia dell’arte and Two Solitudes from novelist Hugh MacLennan, these two snobs set up an ironically touching scene of the cultural distance between English and French Canadians."
