= Tenderness (sculpture) =

Sculpture in Montreal, Quebec, Canada

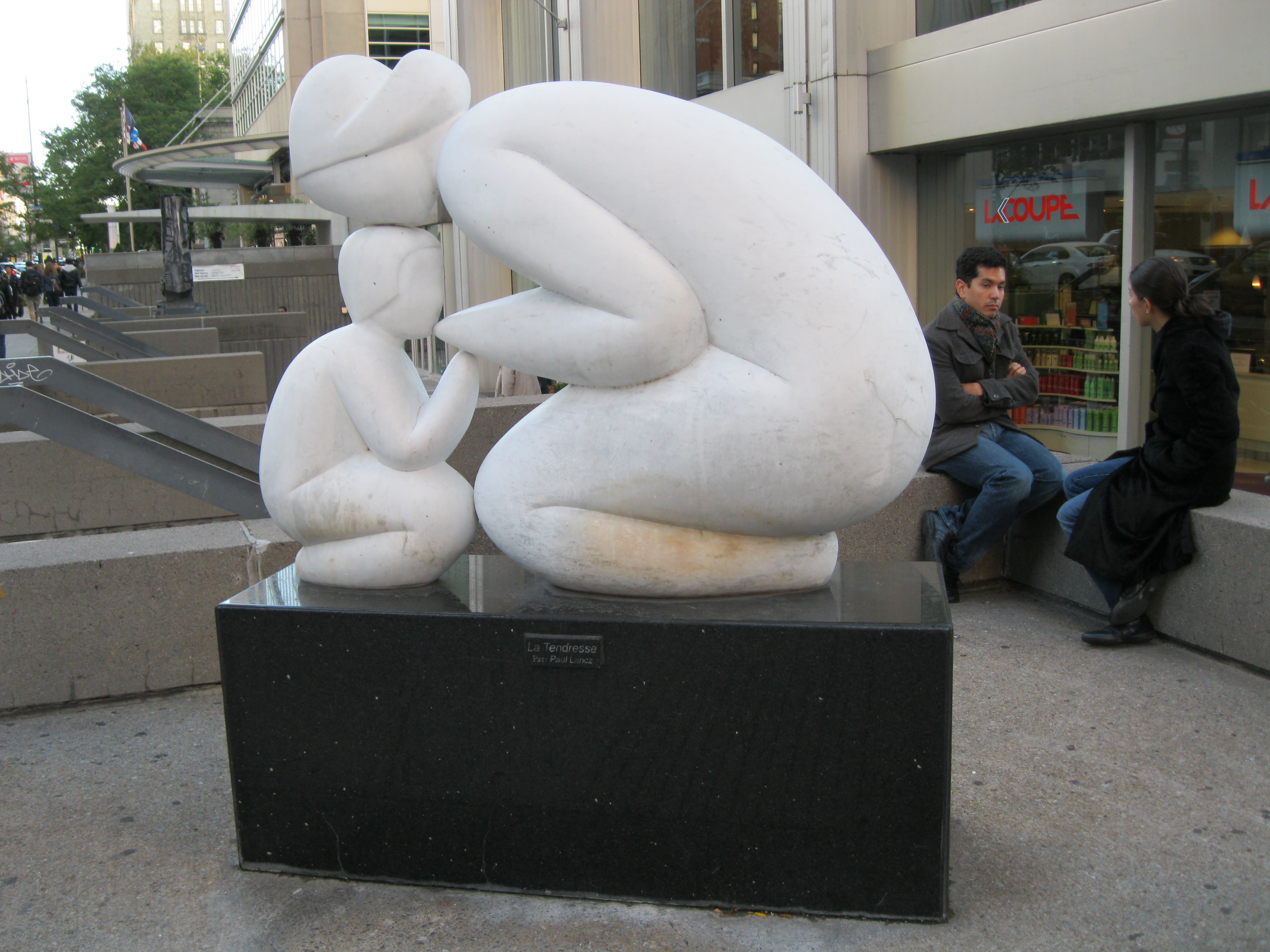
- The sculpture in 2012
- Artist: Paul Lancz
- Medium: Marble sculpture
- Location: Montreal, Quebec, Canada
- 45°30′07″N 73°34′36″W

Tenderness is an outdoor white Carrara marble sculpture by Paul Lancz, depicting a mother and child, installed at the corner of Sherbrooke and Peel streets in Montreal, Quebec, Canada.

== Description ==
The sculpture was created to depict two entities of equal significance showing their devotion to each other. The artist shows this through child kissing their mother's hands, and the mother kissing the child's head. It is said to stand as a symbol of indestructibility and invulnerability.
