= Entourage Guimard =

Art installation and railway station entrance in Montreal, Quebec, Canada

Coordinates: 45°30.099′N 73°33.713′W

- The entrance in 2026
- Artist: Hector Guimard
- Location: Montreal, Quebec, Canada

Entourage Guimard is an art installation and Square-Victoria–OACI station entrance designed by Hector Guimard in Montreal's Victoria Square, in Quebec, Canada.

The cast iron and Comblanchien stone Art Nouveau-style structure was donated by Régie autonome des transports parisiens (RATP), and is owned by Société de transport de Montréal. The structure was installed in Victoria Square in 1967, and restored in 2003.

== See also ==
- An Entrance to the Paris Métropolitain
- Paris Métro entrances by Hector Guimard
