= Polypède =

Sculpture in Montreal, Quebec, Canada

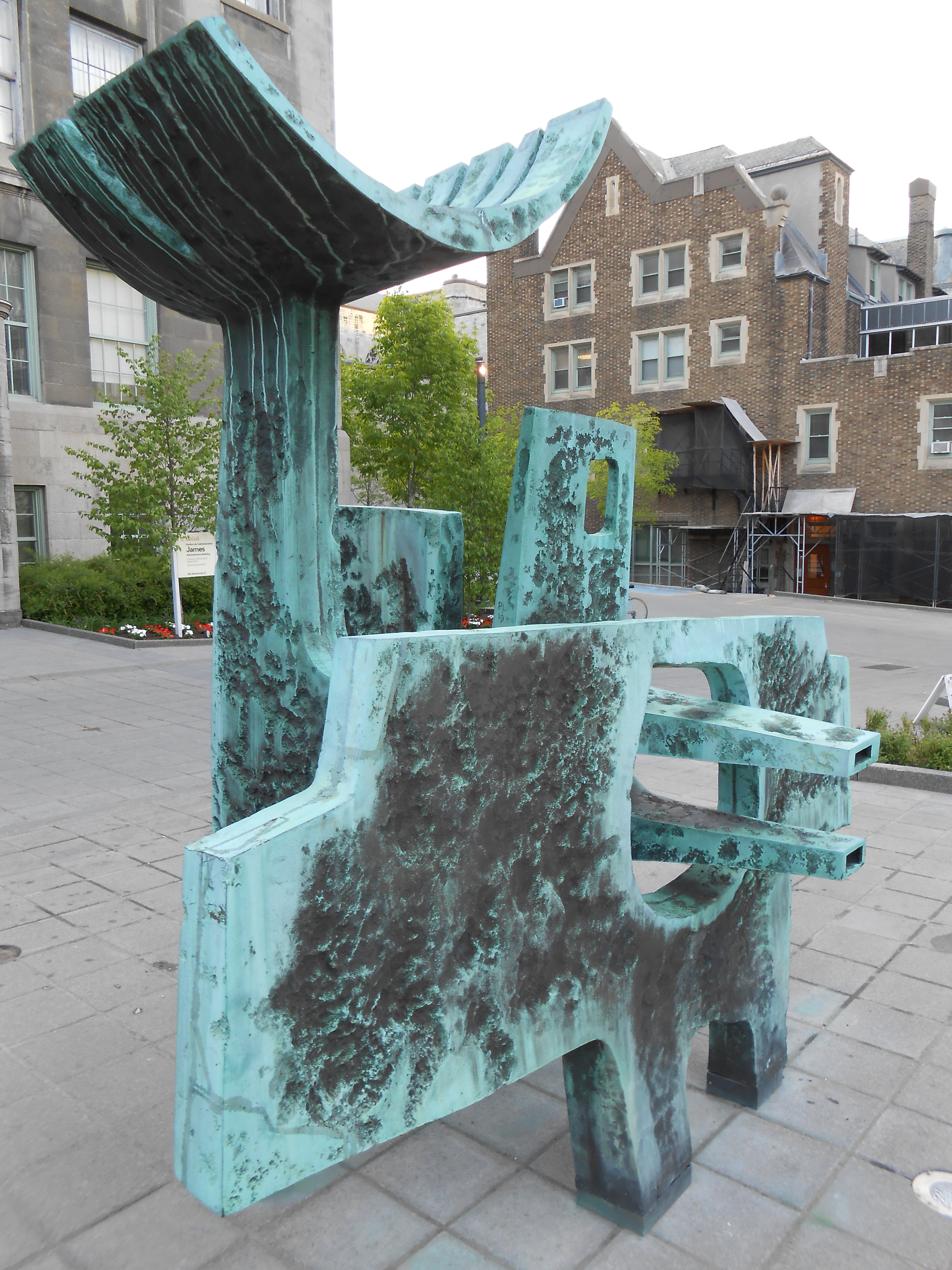
- The sculpture in 2013
- Artist: Charles Daudelin
- Year: 1967
- Medium: Bronze sculpture
- Location: Montreal, Quebec, Canada; 45°30′21″N 73°34′38″W

Polypède is an outdoor 1967 bronze sculpture by Charles Daudelin, installed at Montreal's McGill University, in Quebec, Canada.
