= Pierre Bourgault (artist) =

Canadian artist (born 1942)

- Born: September 12, 1942; Saint-Jean-Port-Joli, Quebec
- Education: internship at the Accademia di Belle Arti di Firenze (1965-1966): master's degree in visual arts from University of Laval, Quebec City (1996)
- Known for: abstract sculptor, educator

Pierre Bourgault (born 1942) is an abstract sculptor living in Saint-Jean-Port-Joli, Quebec where he was born. In 2022, he won the Governor General's Awards in Visual and Media Arts.

== Early years and training ==
Bourgault was born into a large family of wood sculptors. His father Jean-Julien Bourgault, and his two uncles, Médard and André Bourgault, founded the Saint-Jean-Port-Joli traditional school of wood sculpture in 1940. In 1966 he completed an internship at the Accademia di Belle Arti di Firenze and then in 1967 founded a Sculpture School in Saint-Jean-Port-Joli and became its last director (1971-1986). In 1992, he co-founded Est-Nord-Est, an international artist residence. In 1996, he received a master's degree in visual arts from Laval University.

== Work ==
The artist makes huge abstract sculpture of wood, steel and aluminum, that are related to the sea and his lived and felt experiences of it (for this reason he sometimes is called the "sea sculptor"). His 34-foot-long public sculpture Latitude 51° 27' 50' – Longitude 57° 16' 12' (2007) which distantly suggests the hull of a boat exhibited on the Promenade Samuel-de-Champlain in Quebec City caused controversy. He also has made small houses, sculptures which can be inhabited, what he calls places of refuge - walled spaces raised from the ground which can turn in a circle so that they form a place from which to observe as well as live.

His exhibitions are named after the sea and the usual (wind, boats) or unusual experiences that he has had with it. He has exhibited his work in many galleries and museums, including a group show at the Pointe-à-callière, Montréal archaeology and history complex with Gilles Vigneault (1995) and solo shows at Gallery UQAM titled Pierre Bourgault: L'horizontale imaginee (2007) and at the Center d'artistes Vaste et Vague in Carleton-sur-Mer titled Time Tremor (2016). His sculpture is in such public collections as the Musée national des beaux-arts du Québec.

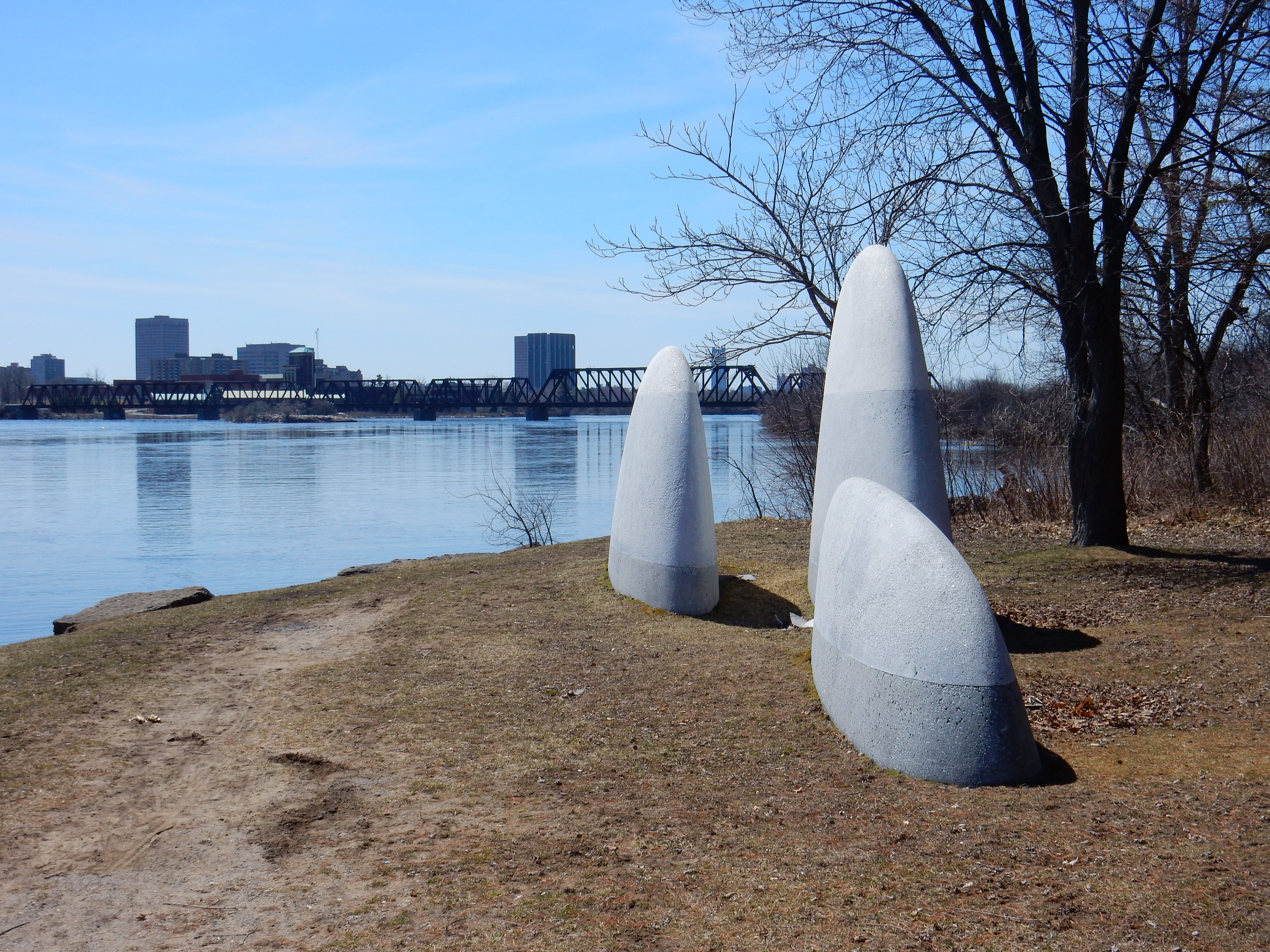
Street Art Gatineau, Quebec, Canada 43

His many public commissions include Three Forms by the Sea (1984) in Gatineau, Quebec. From 1999, his public commissions may be related to Inuit String Games, as in Ayarak at the Palais de Justice of Saint-Jérôme in Saint-Jérôme, Laurentides, QC (1999); in Montreal, The Imagined Village. The Fox Wins, Tracks Him... (2005) located in Marguerite-Bourgeoys park; The two brown bears (2009); String Game (2012) at Centre de Recherche du CHUM; and String Game (2013) at the Centre hospitalier de l'Université de Montréal, among others.

== Awards ==
- Paul-Émile Borduas Prize, 2020
- Governor General's Awards in Visual and Media Arts, 2022.
