= Statue of Jean Béliveau =

Jean Béliveau
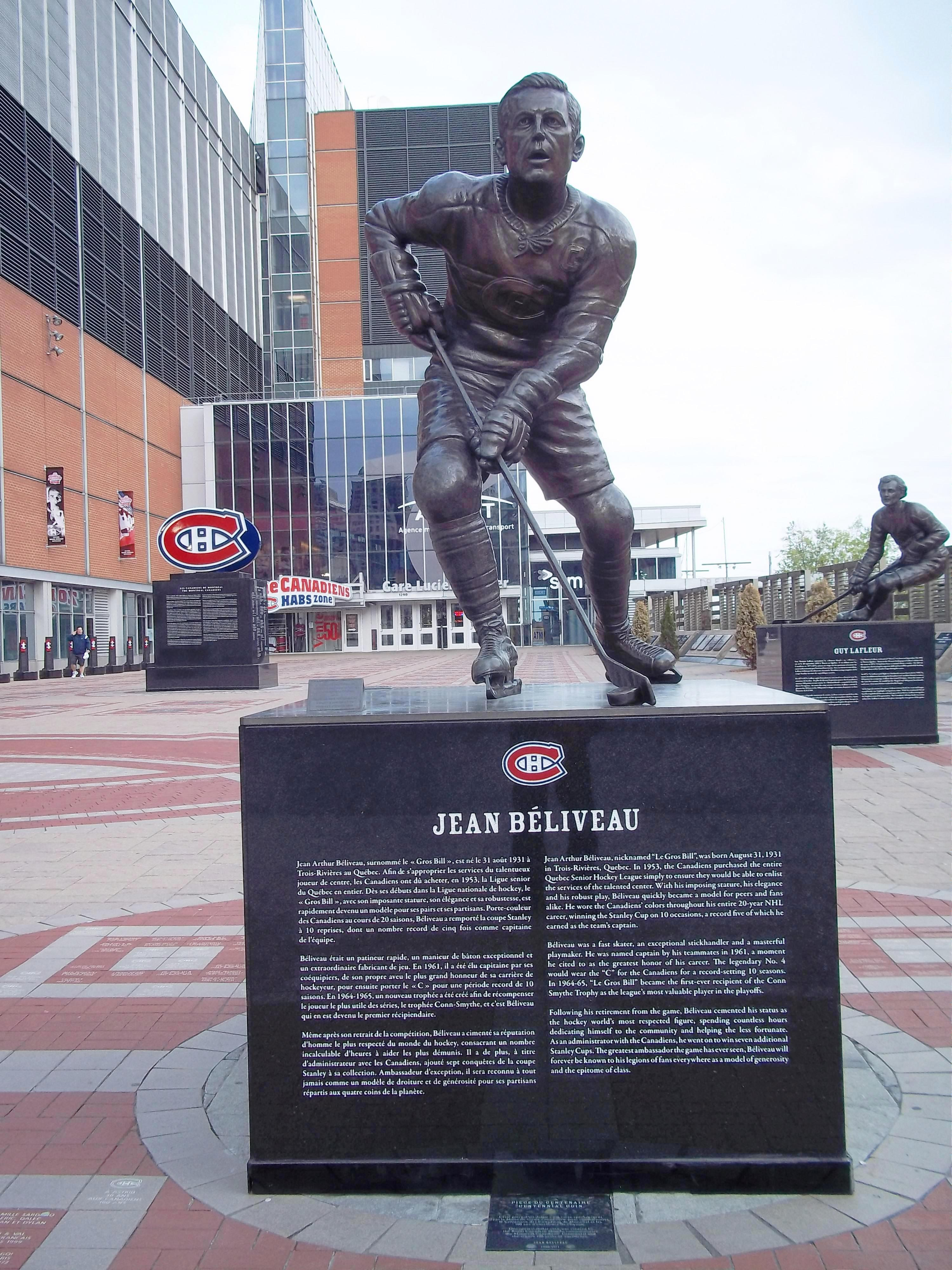
- The statue in 2012
- Medium: Sculpture
- Subject: Jean Béliveau
- Location: Montreal, Quebec, Canada; 45.49646°N 73.56885°W

Jean Béliveau is an outdoor sculpture depicting the Canadian professional ice hockey player of the same name, installed outside Montreal's Bell Centre, in Quebec, Canada.
