= Statue of Maurice Richard =

Sculpture in Montreal, Quebec, Canada

Maurice Richard
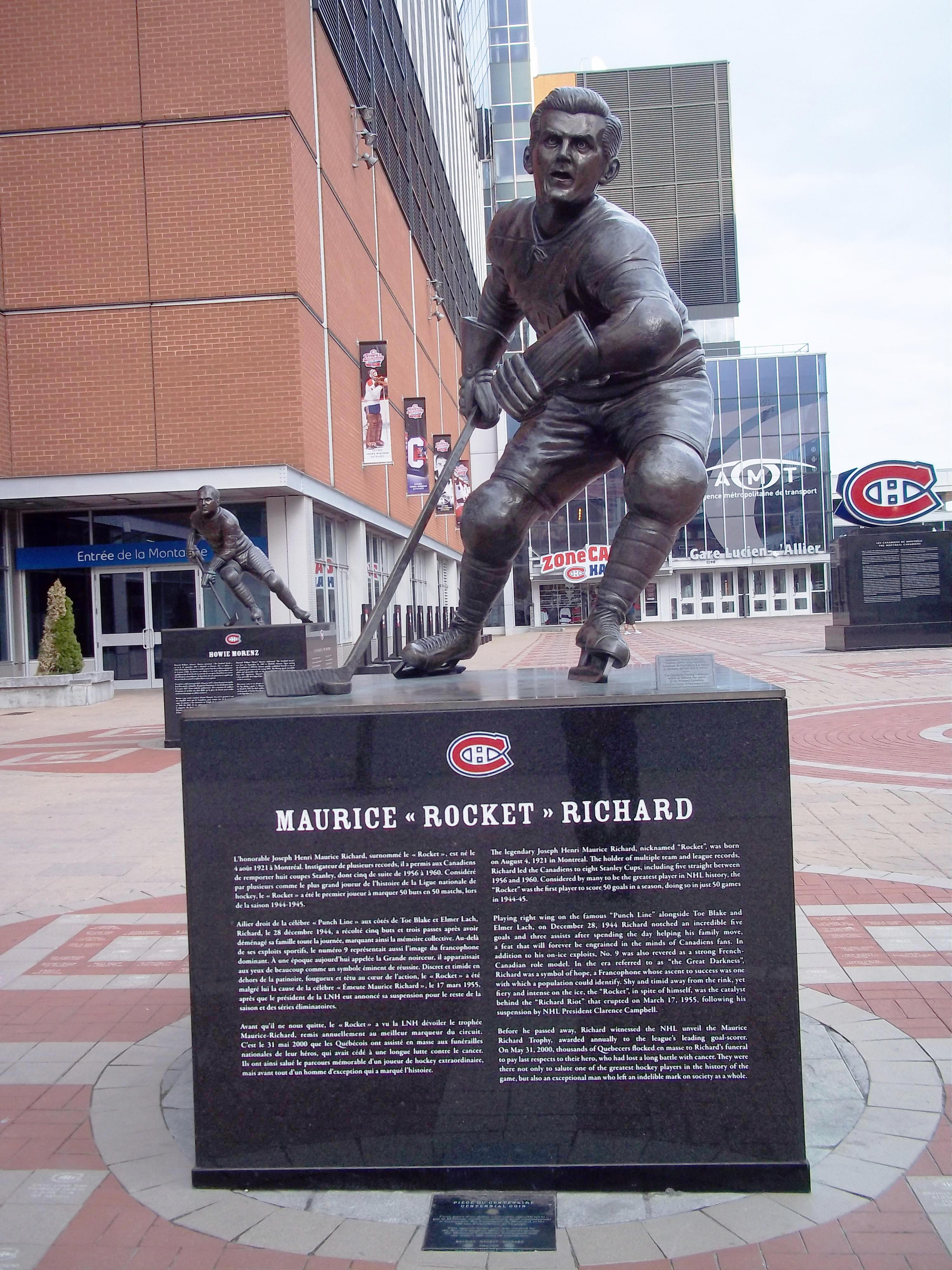
- The statue in 2012
- Medium: Sculpture
- Subject: Maurice Richard
- Location: Montreal, Quebec, Canada; 45.49646°N 73.56885°W

Maurice Richard is an outdoor sculpture depicting the Canadian professional ice hockey player of the same name, installed outside Montreal's Bell Centre, in Quebec, Canada.
