= Exaltation (sculpture) =

1981 sculpture by John Porretta

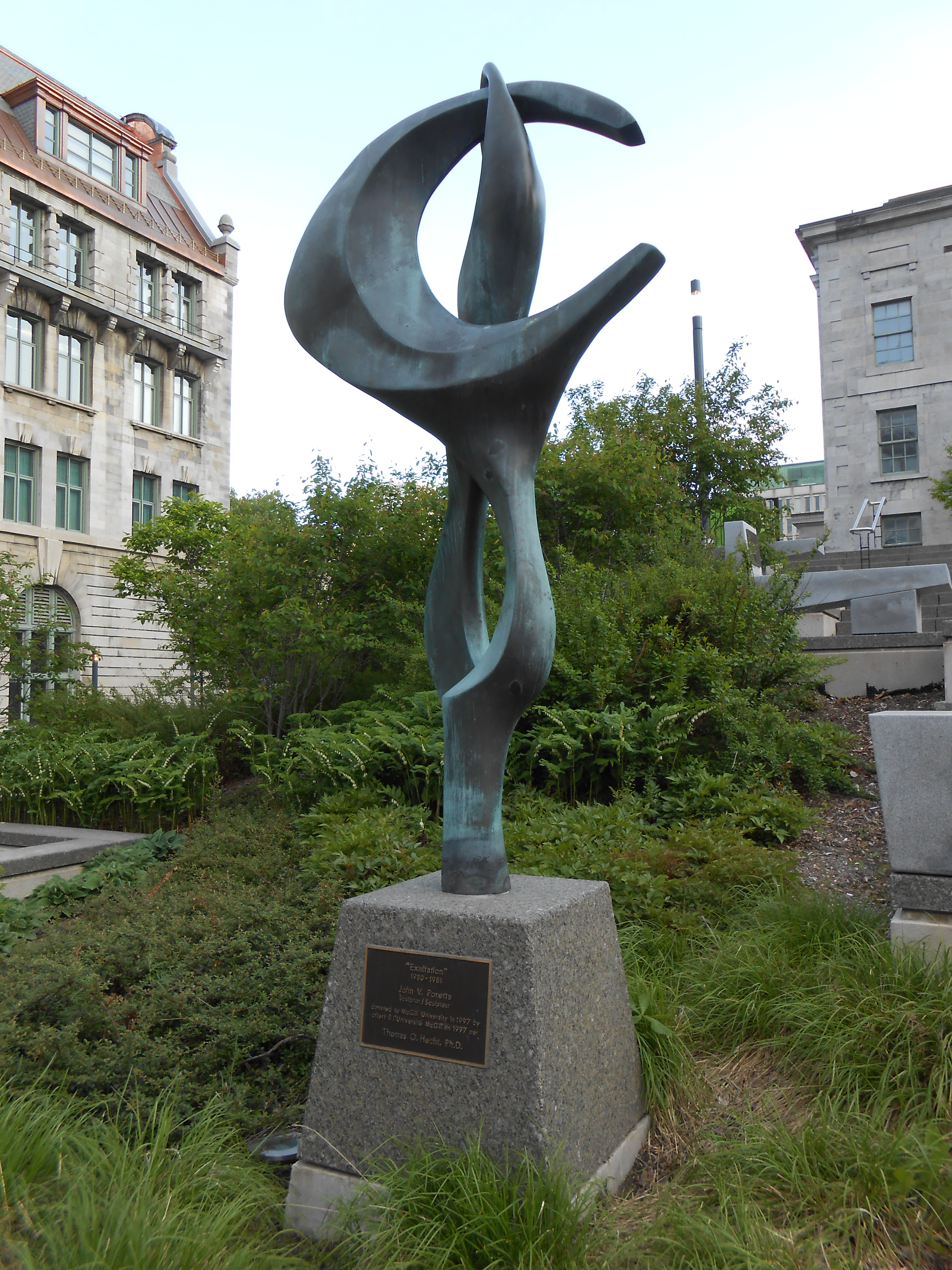
- The sculpture in 2013
- Artist: Giovanni (John) Porretta
- Year: 1981
- Medium: Sculpture
- Location: Montreal, Quebec, Canada; 45°30′21″N 73°34′37″W

Exaltation is an outdoor 1981 sculpture by Giovanni (John) Porretta, installed in McGill University's James Sculpture Garden, in Montreal, Quebec, Canada.
