= Jean McEwen =

Canadian painter (1923–1999)

Jean Albert McEwen
- Born: December 14, 1923; Montreal, Quebec, Canada
- Died: January 9, 1999 (aged 75); Montreal, Quebec, Canada
- Known for: Abstract painter

Jean Albert McEwen RCA (December 14, 1923 – January 9, 1999) was a Canadian painter known for his lyrical abstraction.

== Early life ==
McEwen was born in 1923 Montreal to a Scottish father and French-Canadian mother. He began his working life as a pharmacist, having received a degree in pharmacy from the University of Montreal in 1947.

== Art career ==
McEwen was self-taught as a painter. The first exhibition of his work was in the 1949 Annual Spring Exhibition, a group show at the Montreal Museum of Fine Arts.

Following the positive reception of his work as a painter in Montreal, he quit his job as a pharmacist and left Montreal for Paris, encouraged to meet Jean-Paul Riopelle. In Paris, he was introduced to the painters Riopelle, Georges Mathieu and Sam Francis as well as visiting museums in Italy, Holland and Spain. On his return to Montreal in 1953, he was committed to non-figurative art, influenced by French impressionism and American abstract expressionism.

In 1956, he participated in Galerie Actuelle's Montreal exhibition of non-figurative art, which was his true starting point. That same year, he became a member of the newly formed multi-faceted The Non-Figurative Artists Association of Montreal, and in 1960, he was elected its last president. In 1961, McEwen received the Hadassah prize and first prize at the Concours artistiques de la province de Québec, as well as a grant from the Canada Council for the Arts. In the same year, he also had his first solo show at Gallery Moos, in Toronto, and Alfred Barr, director of the Museum of Modern Art, in New York, acquired one of his paintings for the Museum of Modern Art, which contributed to his reputation among the vanguard of Canadian artists.

In the works of his maturity, McEwen employed an allover field composition bisected by a central vertical but varied colour and ways of handling pigment, either brushed on or applied with a palette knife for a rich impasto surface effect. He used many layers of pigment to give an effect of luminosity and shimmering light.

== Selected exhibitions ==
McEwen took part in many exhibitions, both in Canada and abroad, among them the Biennial Exhibitions of Canadian Art and the Province of Quebec Exhibition. In 1963, he showed his work in New York at the Martha Jackson Gallery and after that, in many places abroad, notably Brazil and England.

In 1964, he was made an Associate member of the Royal Canadian Academy of Arts; he became a full member in 1968. From 1982 to 1994, he was professor at Concordia University. In 1998, he received the Prix Paul-Émile-Borduas from the Government of Quebec. In 1987, McEwen's work was the subject of a retrospective at the Montreal Museum of Fine Arts. In 1990, his work was shown with that of John Fox by Heffel Gallery, Vancouver. A second commemorative exhibition titled Untamed Colour: Celebrating Jean McEwen was held there in 2019 to commemorate the 20th anniversary of his death.

== Collections ==
His work is included in the collections of the Albright-Knox Art Gallery, Buffalo; the Musée national des beaux-arts du Québec, PQ; the Museum of Modern Art, New York; the National Gallery of Canada, Ottawa; and the Art Gallery of Ontario, Toronto, as well as many other collections. In 1966, he painted three glass windows for Concordia University in Montreal (the dimensions of the three panels are 366 x 457 cm each). In 1967, he completed a mural for Place des Arts in Montreal. His estate is represented by Mira Godard Gallery in Toronto.

== Awards ==
- 1976 Canada Council's Victor Martyn Lynch-Staunton Award
