= Louis-Philippe Hébert =

Canadian sculptor

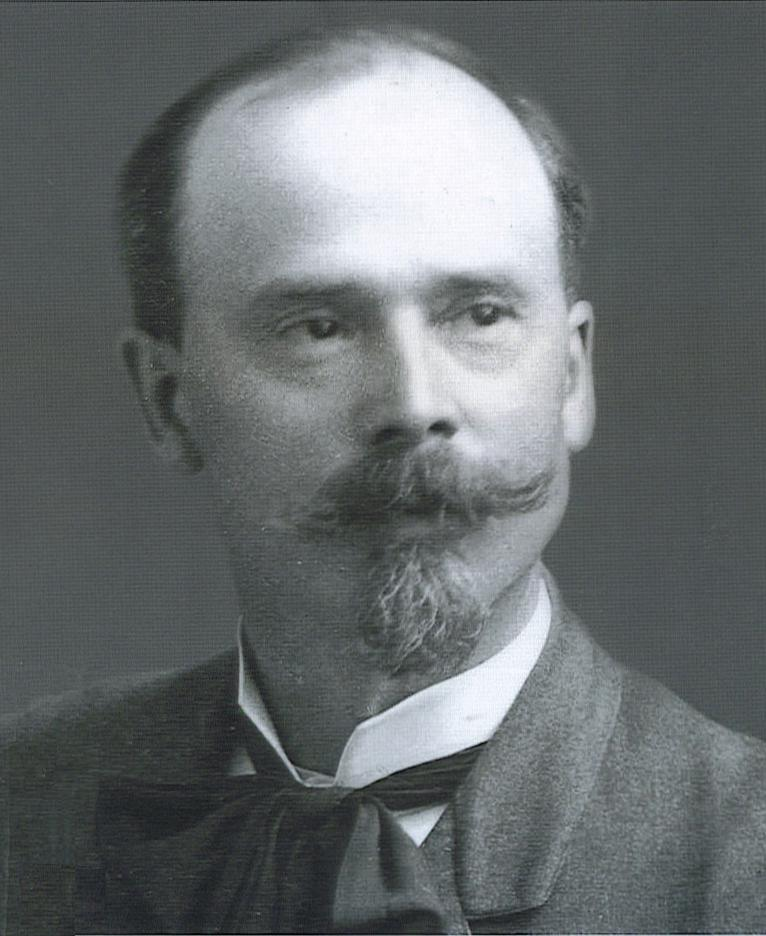
- Louis-Philippe Hébert
- Born: 27 January 1850; Ste-Sophie de Mégantic, Canada East
- Died: 13 June 1917 (aged 67); Westmount, Montreal, Quebec
- Education: Napoléon Bourassa
- Known for: sculptor, educator

Louis-Philippe Hébert CMG RCA (French pronunciation: [lwi filip ebɛʁ]; 27 January 1850 – 13 June 1917) was a Canadian sculptor. He is considered one of the best sculptors of his generation.

== Career ==
Hébert was the son of Théophile Hébert, a farmer, and Julie Bourgeois of Ste-Sophie de Mégantic, Canada East. At age 19, he enrolled as a Papal Zouave and left for Italy where he found the art an eye-opener. The trip had a major impact on his career. Back in Canada, in 1872, he was initiated in making sculpture in wood by Adolphe Rho at Bécancour, then was mentored by Napoléon Bourassa in new approaches to sculpture in Canada. Hébert sculpted forty monuments, busts, medals and statues in wood, bronze and terra-cotta and taught at the Conseil des arts et manufactures in Montreal, Quebec. He married Maria Roy on 26 May 1879 in Montreal, Quebec. The couple's eight children include Henri Hébert, a sculptor, and Adrien Hébert, a painter.

Hébert was an associate member of the Royal Canadian Academy of Arts (1880 and 1895), a full member in 1886-1889 and 1906. At the Exposition universelle de Paris in 1889, Hébert received a bronze medal, the first for a Canadian artist. He also was awarded the Medal of Confederation (1894) and was made a chevalier of France's Legion of Honour (1901), as well as a Companion of St Michael and St George (Great Britain, 1903). The Prix Philippe-Hébert, named in his honour, has been given to an artist of outstanding ability and stature in Québec arts by the St-Jean-Baptiste Society of Montréal since 1971. He was buried in Notre-Dame-des-Neiges cemetery, Montreal, Quebec.

== Works ==
=== Parliament Hill, Ottawa ===
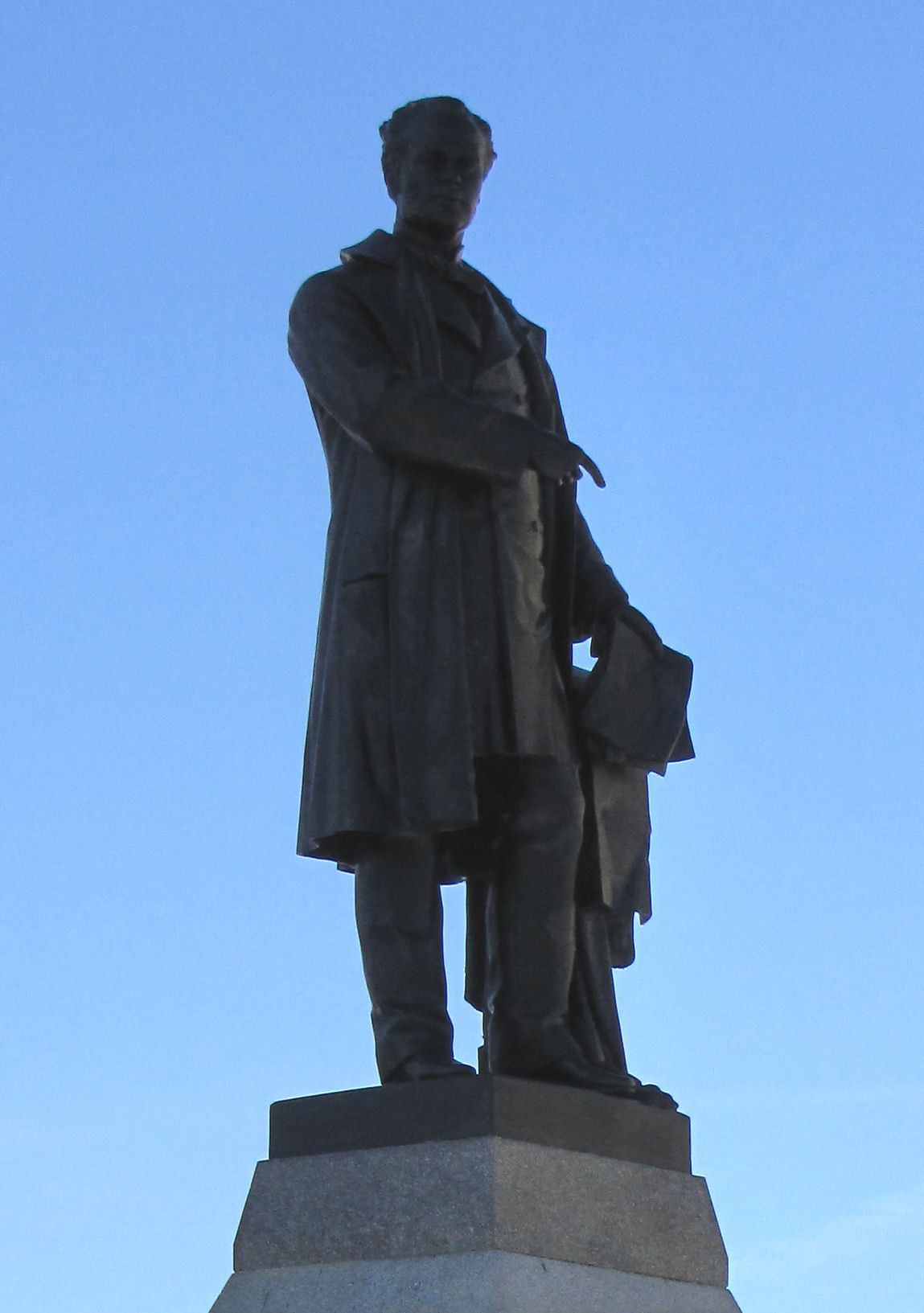
Sir George-Étienne Cartier (1880s) at Parliament Hill in Ottawa, Ontario

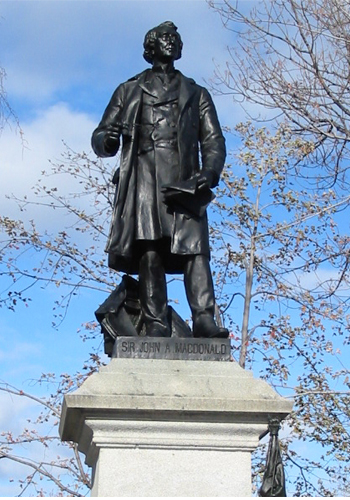
Sir John A. Macdonald (1880s)

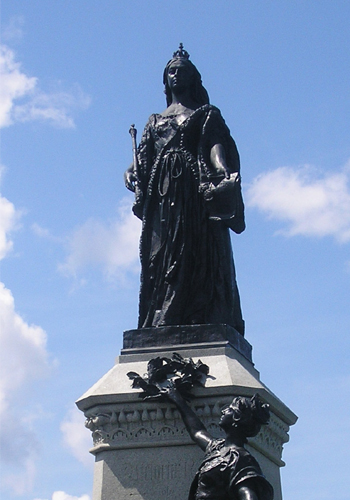
Queen Victoria (1900), dedicated by Prince George, Duke of Cornwall and York in 1901.

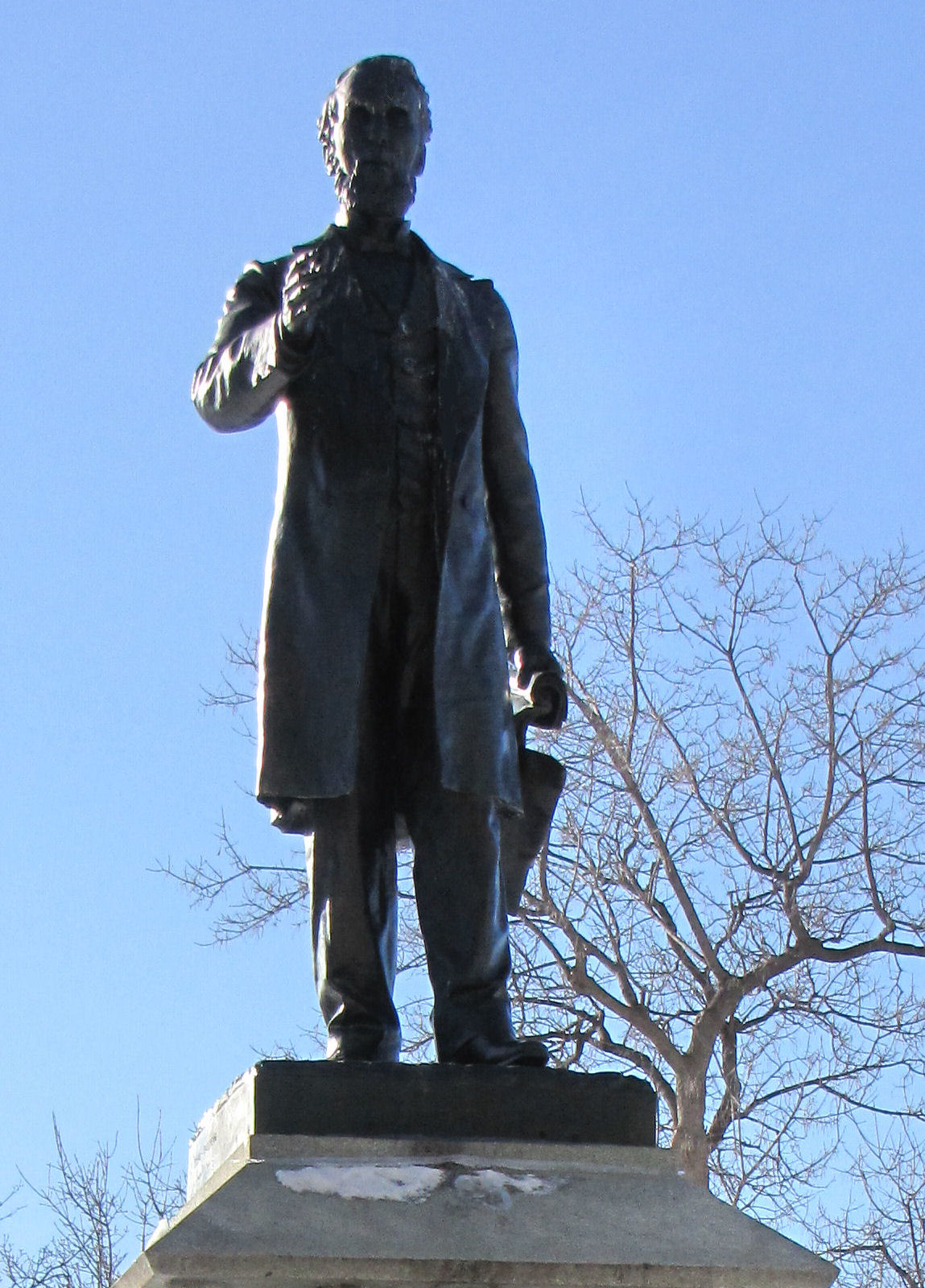
Alexander Mackenzie (1901).

=== Nova Scotia ===
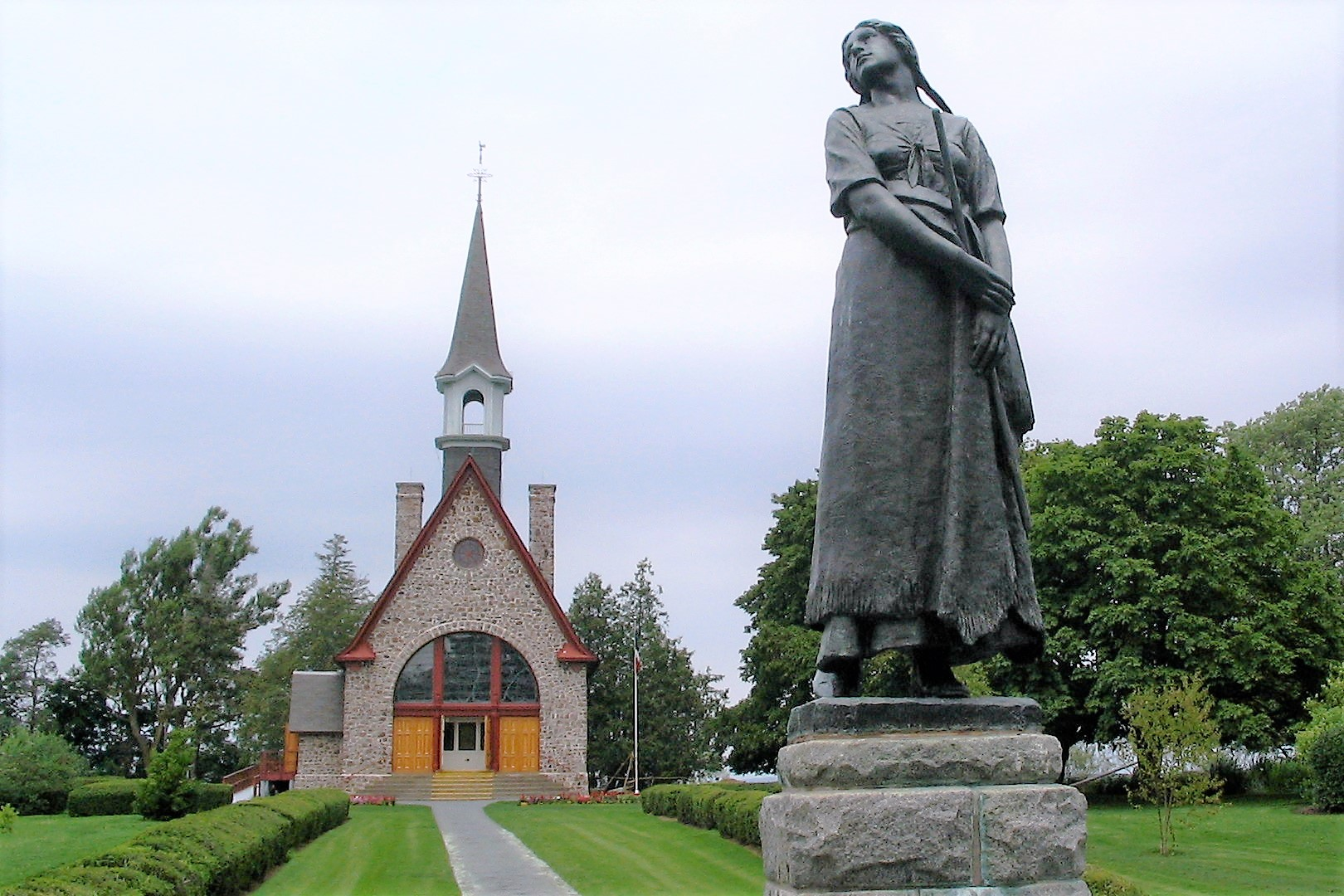
Evangeline (unveiled 1920), Grand Pre, Nova Scotia

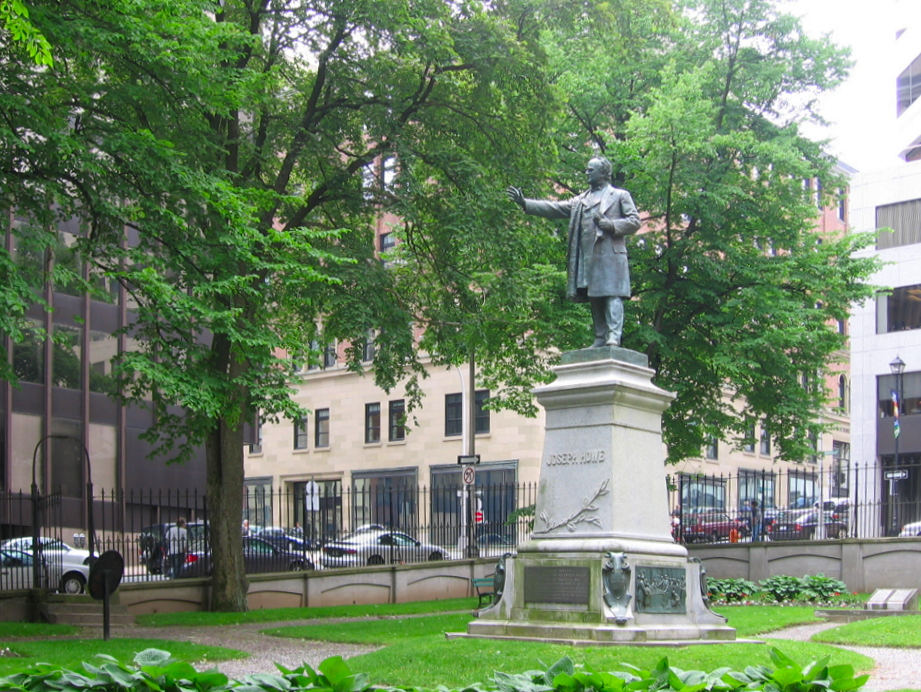
Joseph Howe (1904), Province House, Halifax, Nova Scotia

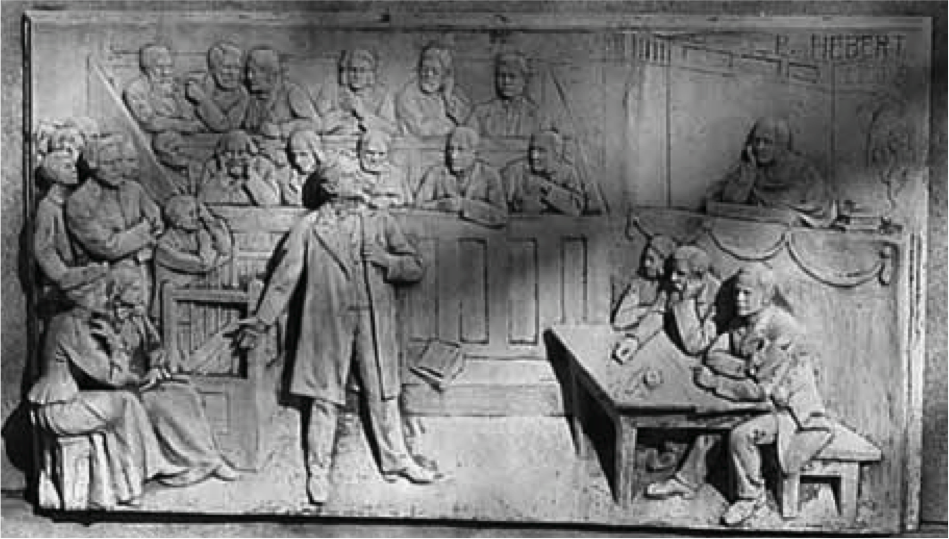
Libel trial of Joseph Howe, Supreme Court (current Legislative Library), Province House (Nova Scotia)

=== Quebec Parliament Building ===
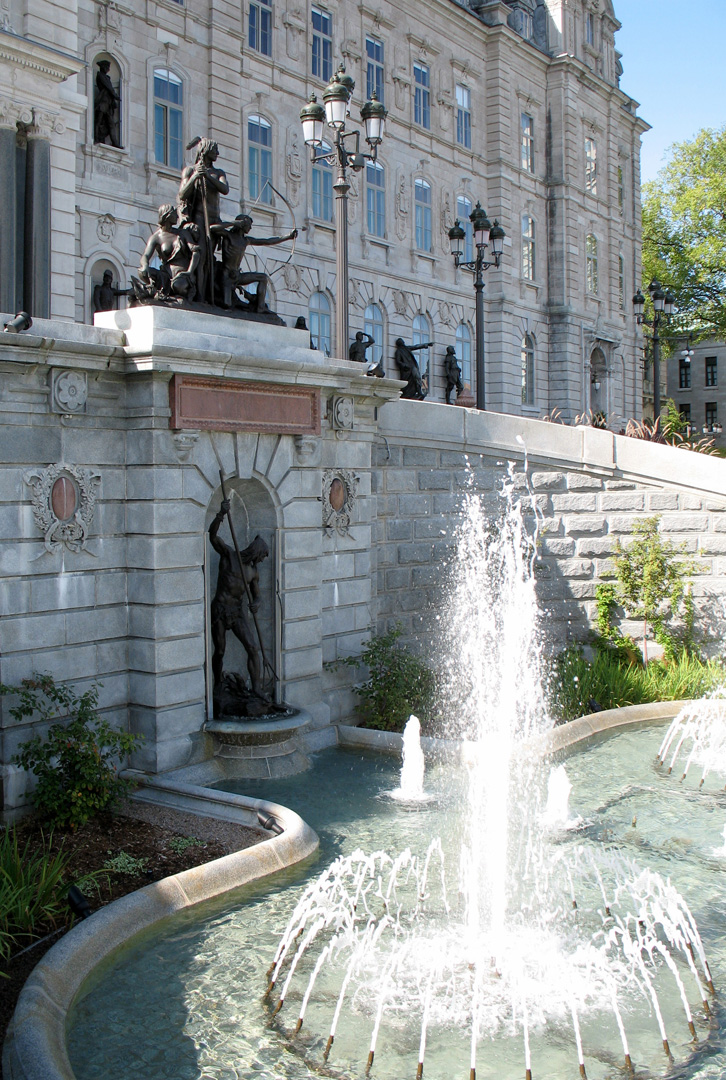
« La Halte dans la forêt » Amerindian family sculpture facade of the Quebec Parliament Building, Québec City.

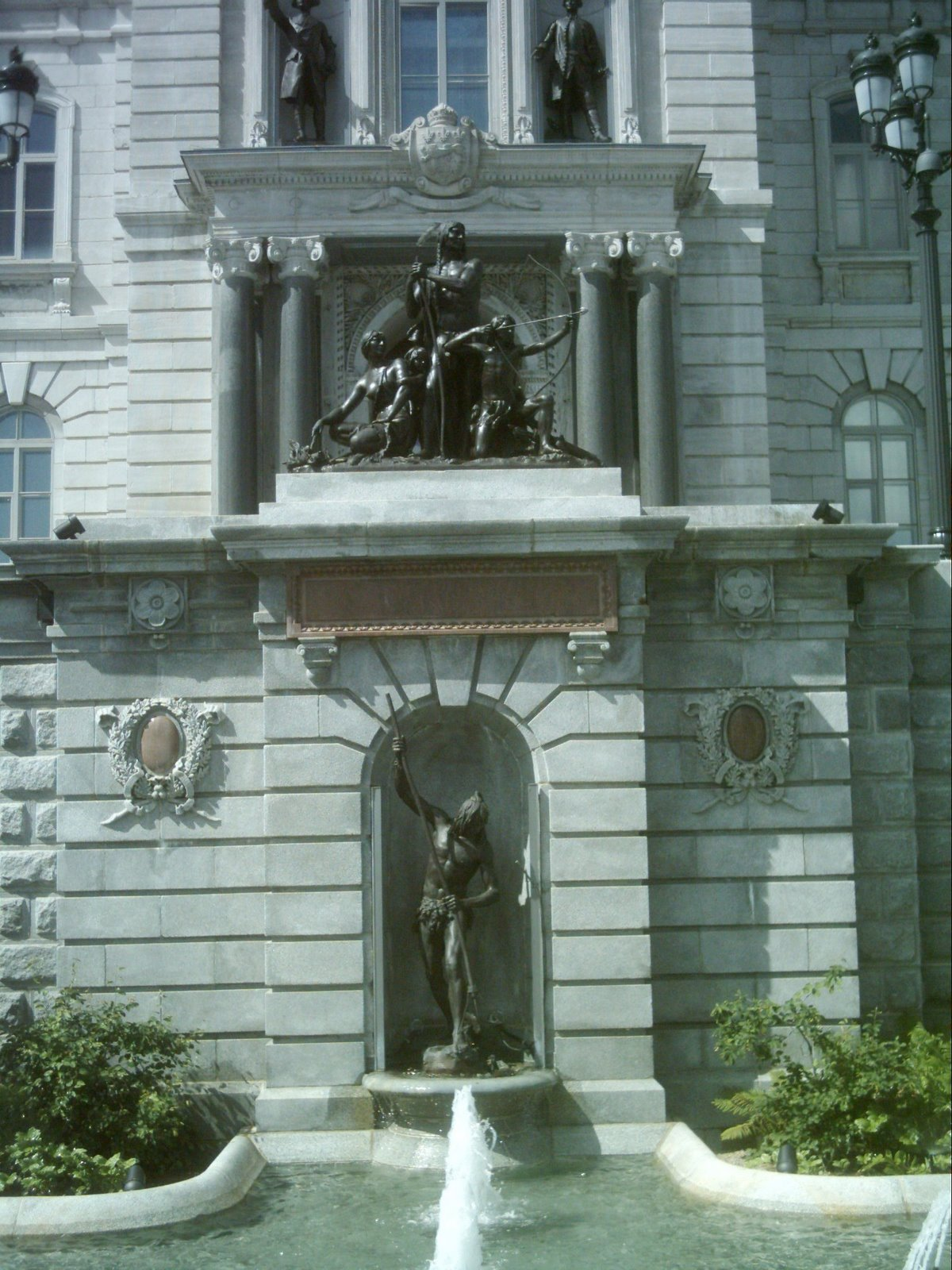
« La Halte dans la forêt » Amerindian family

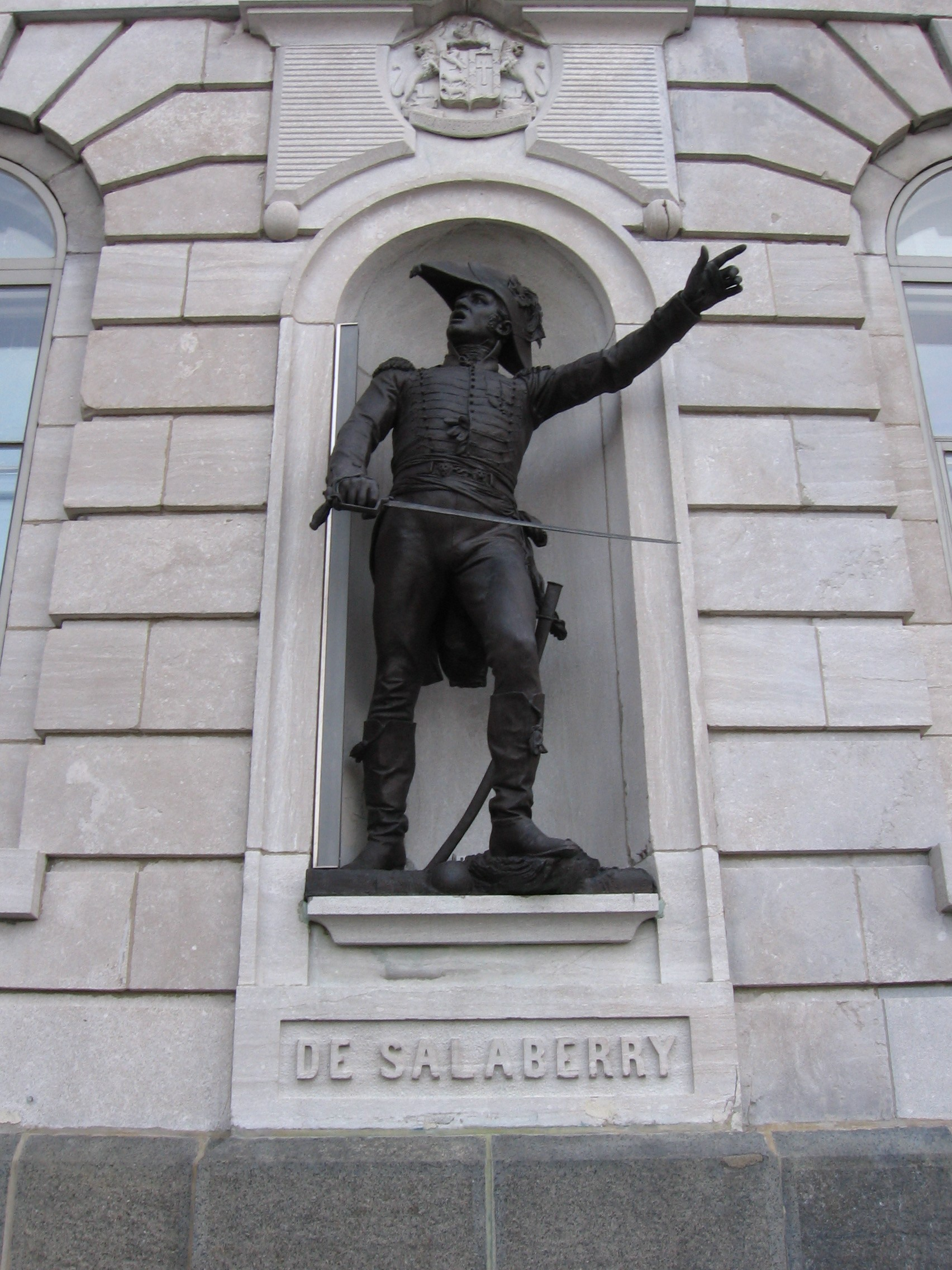
Charles-Michel de Salaberry

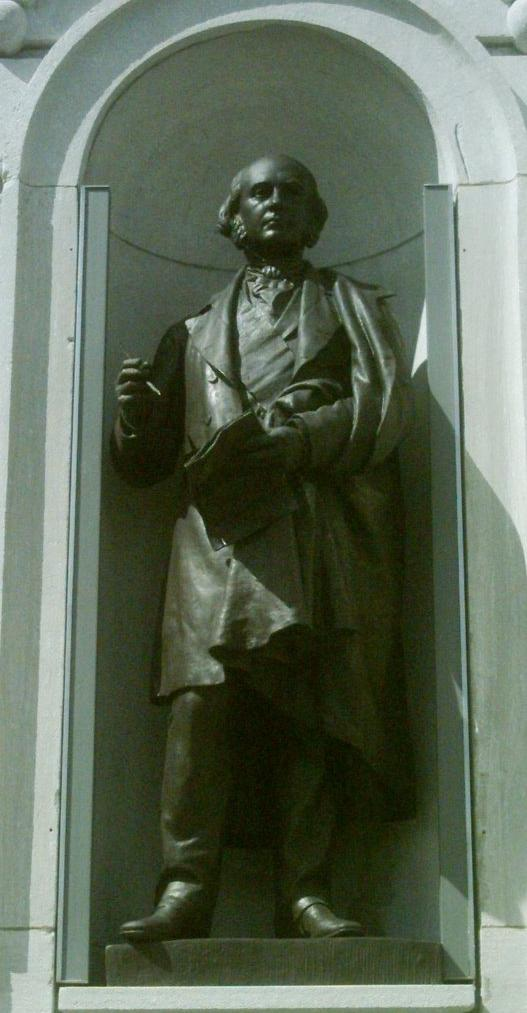
James Bruce, 8th Earl of Elgin

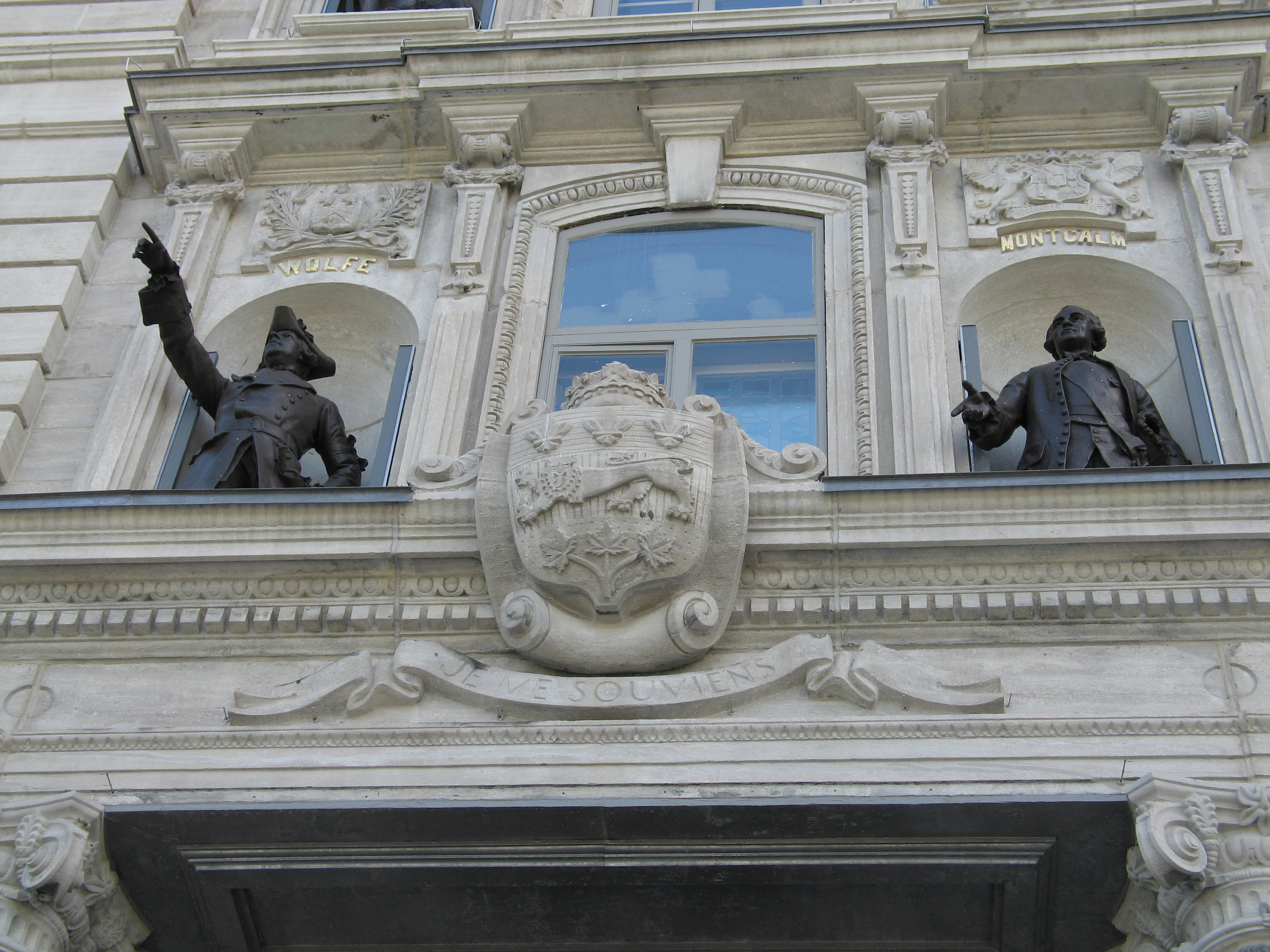
James Wolfe and Marquis de Montcalm

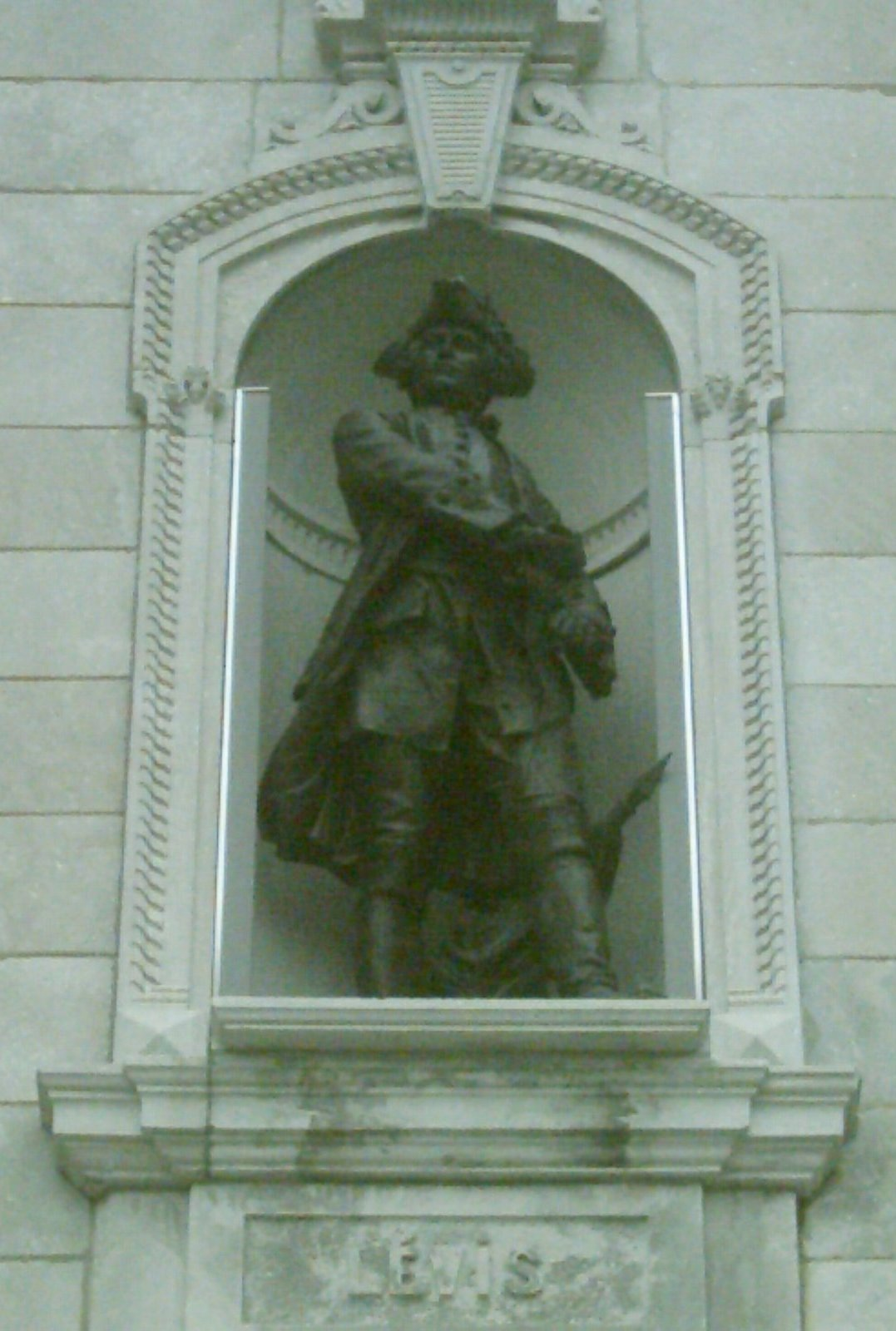
Francis de Gaston, Chevalier de Levis sculpture

=== Montreal, Quebec ===
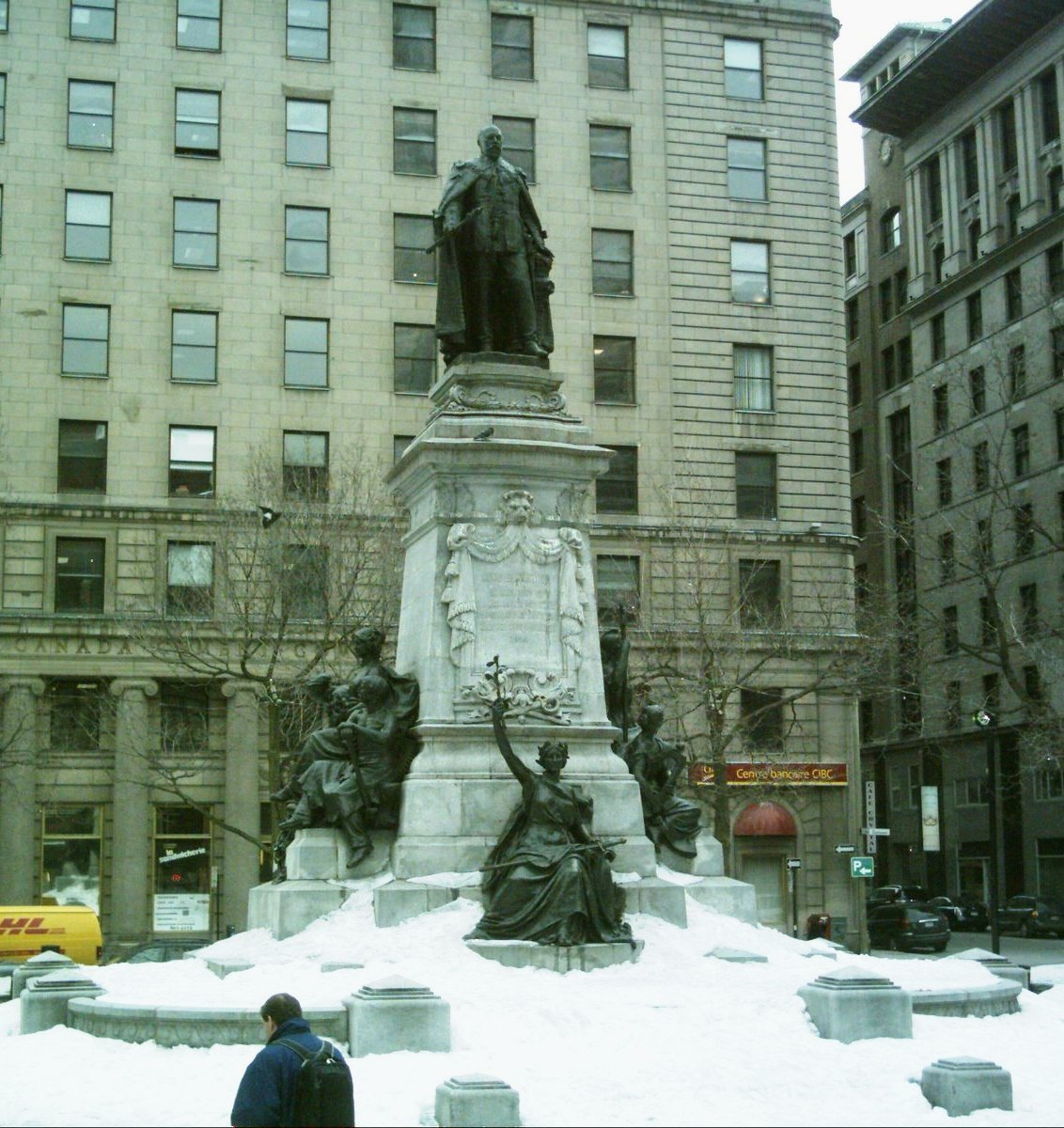
Edward VII Monument (Montreal) (1914) in Phillips Square, Montreal, Quebec

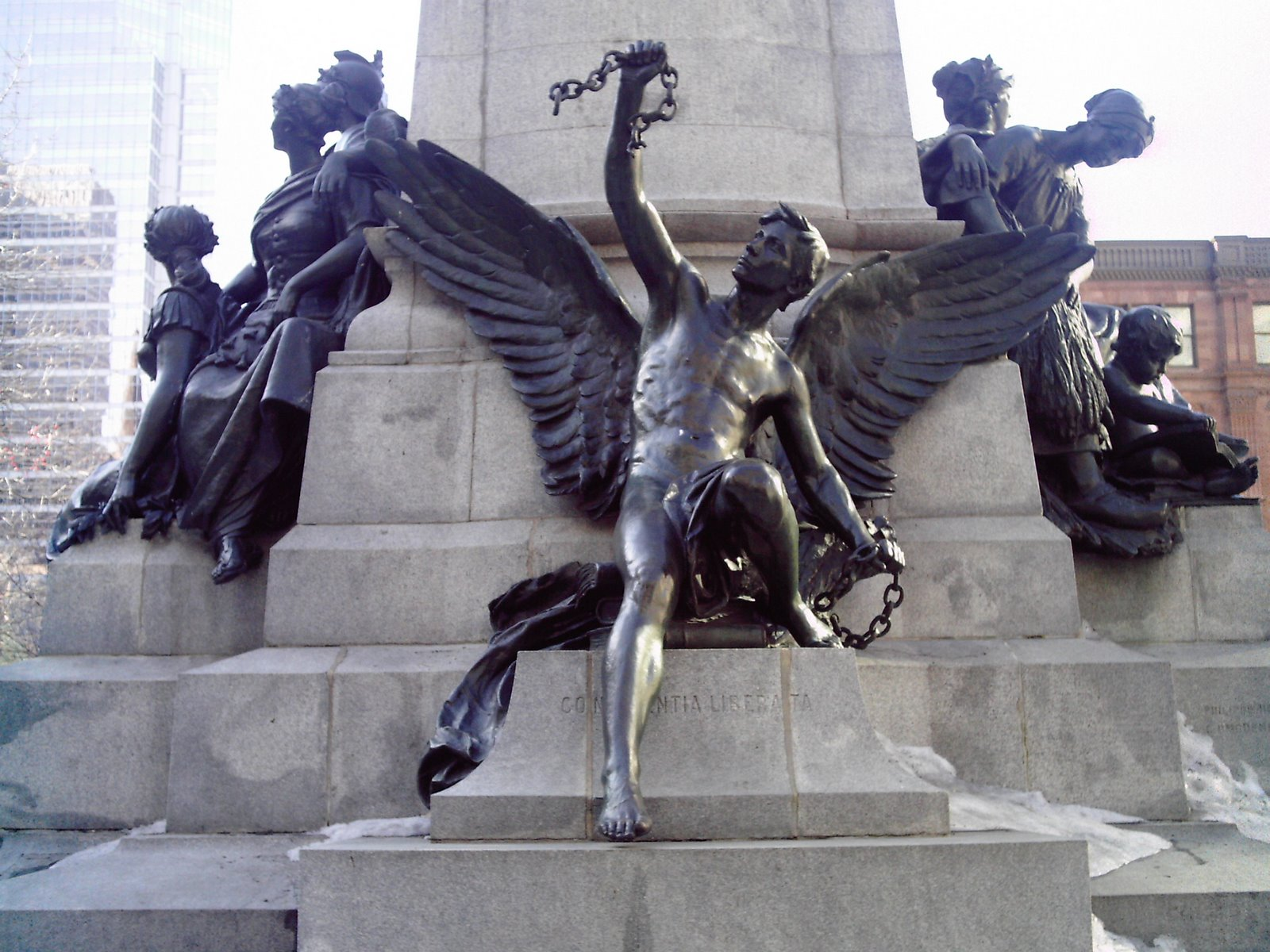
Edward VII Monument (Montreal) (1914) in Phillips Square

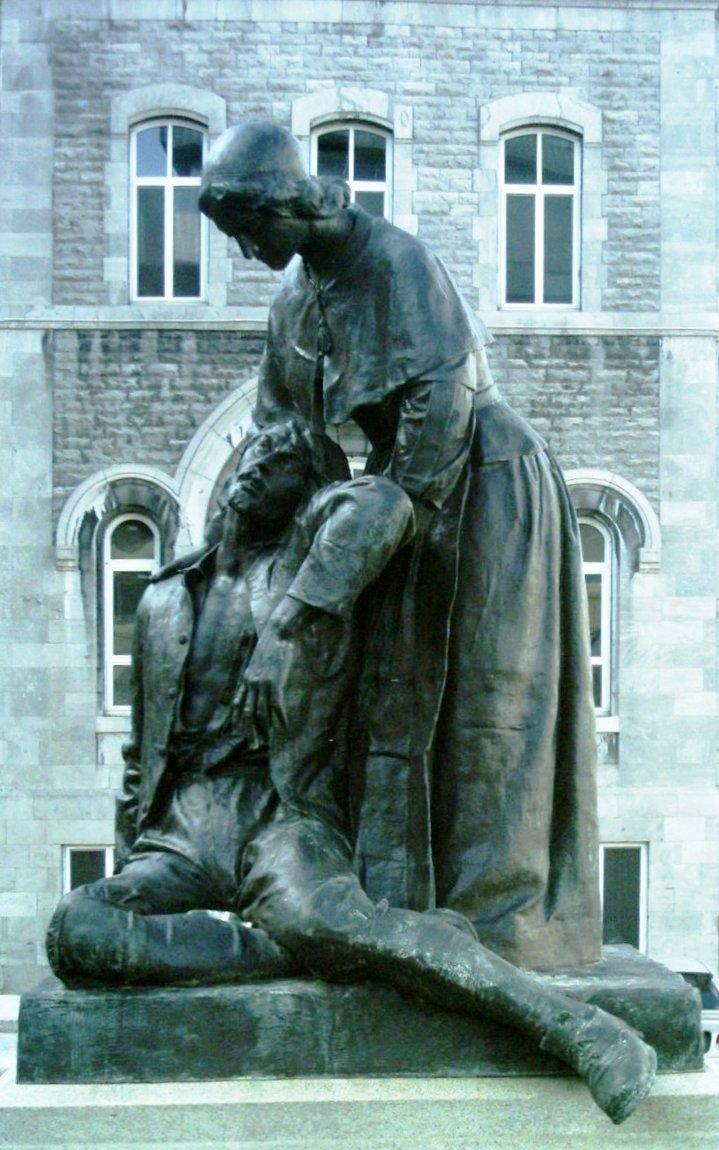
Jeanne Mance Monument at l'hôtel-Dieu de l'avenue des Pins

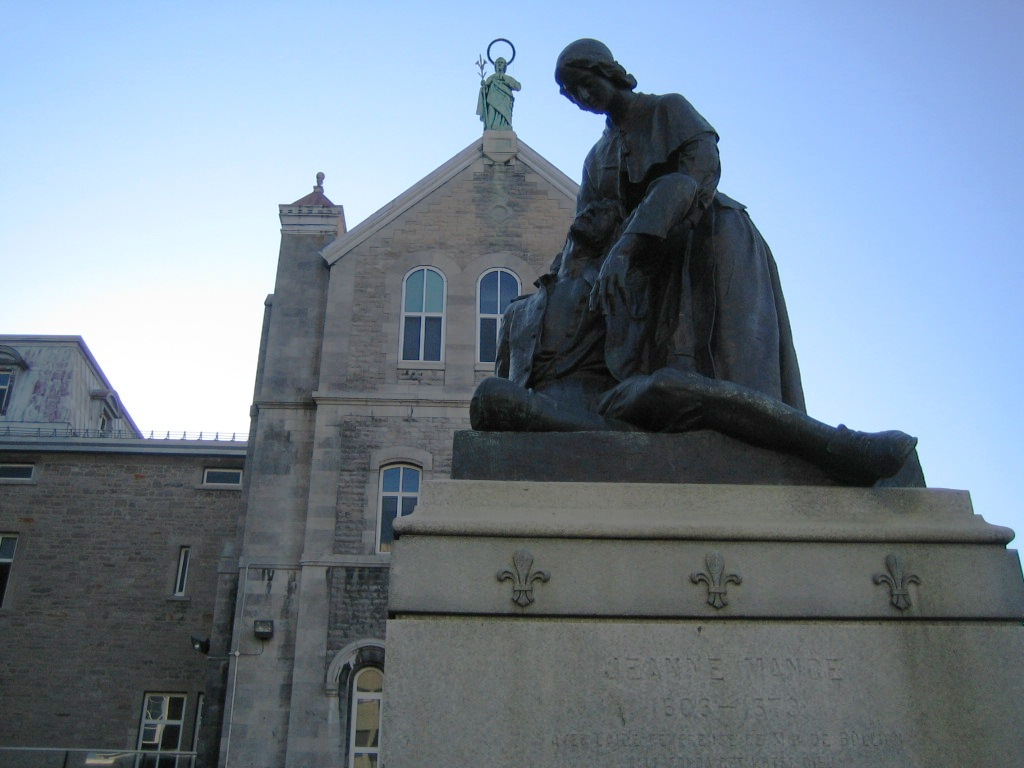
Jeanne Mance Monument at l'hôtel-Dieu de l'avenue des Pins

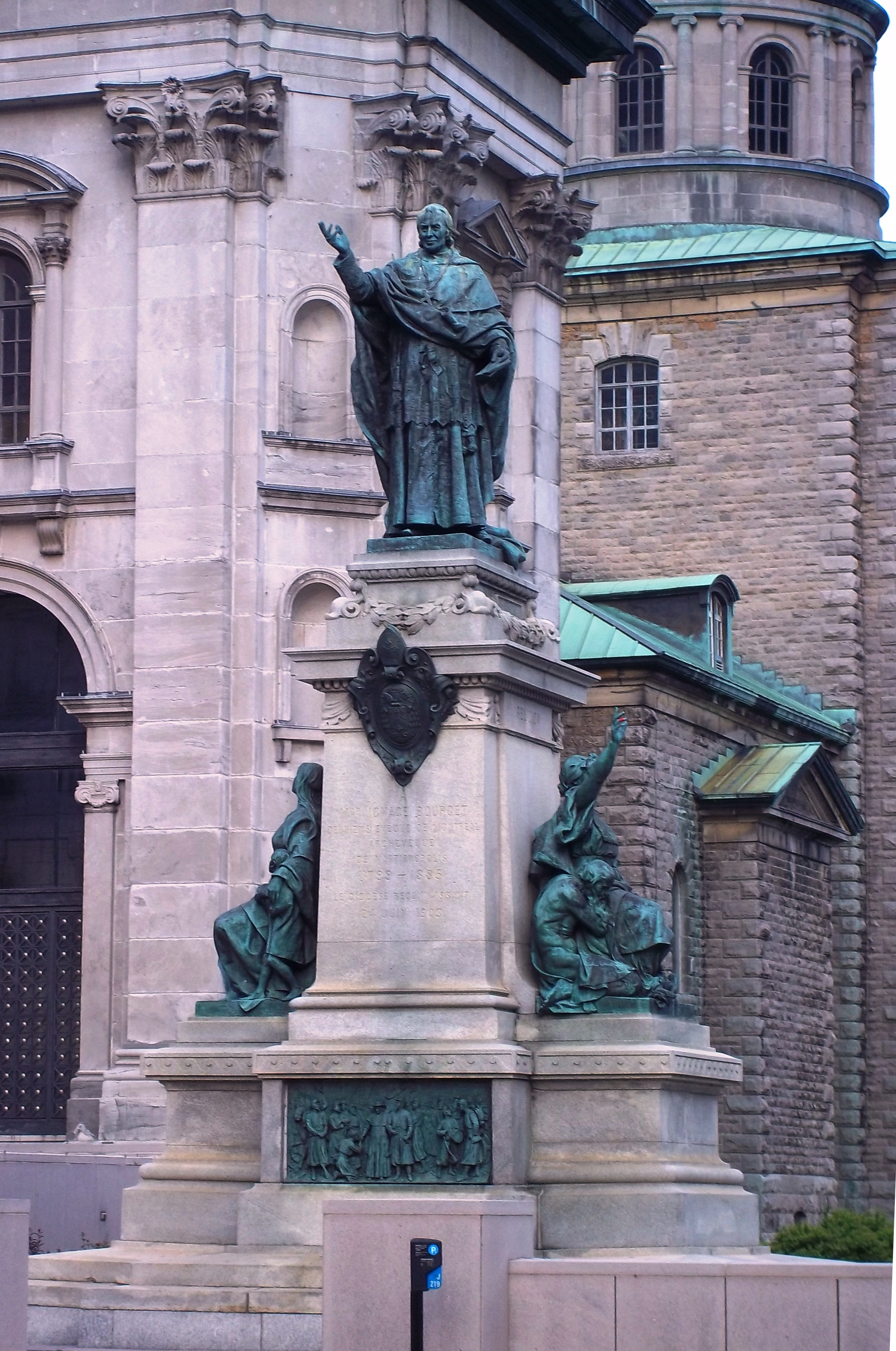
Bishop of Montreal, Ignace Bourget Monument (1903) is in front of Mary, Queen of the World Cathedral

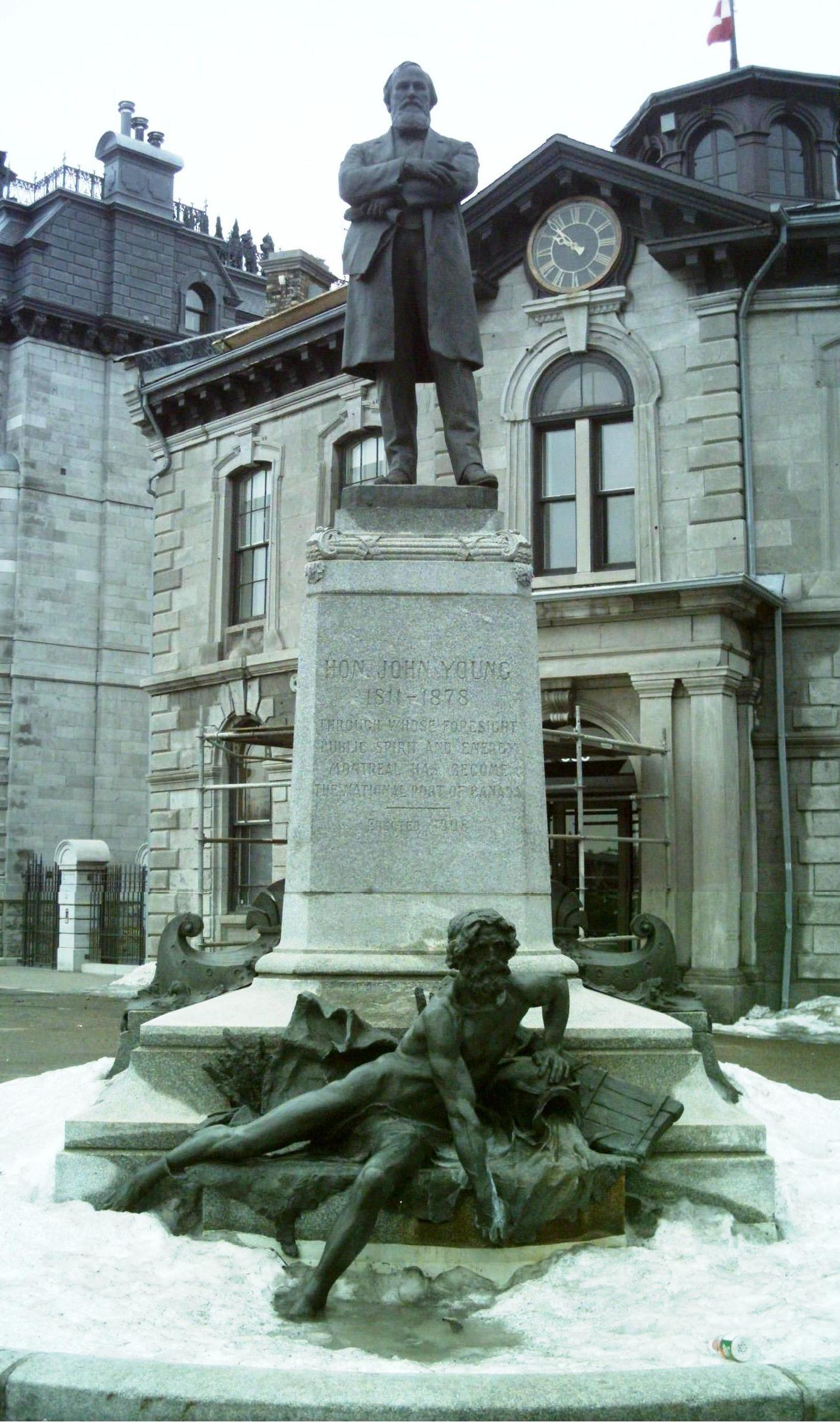
Louis-Philippe Hébert's John Young (1908) was erected at the Old Port of Montreal.

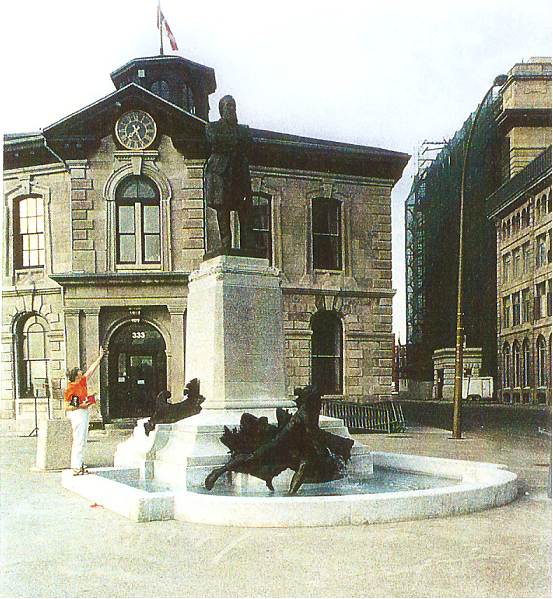
John Young (1908) was erected at the Old Port of Montreal

==== Maisonneuve Monument ====
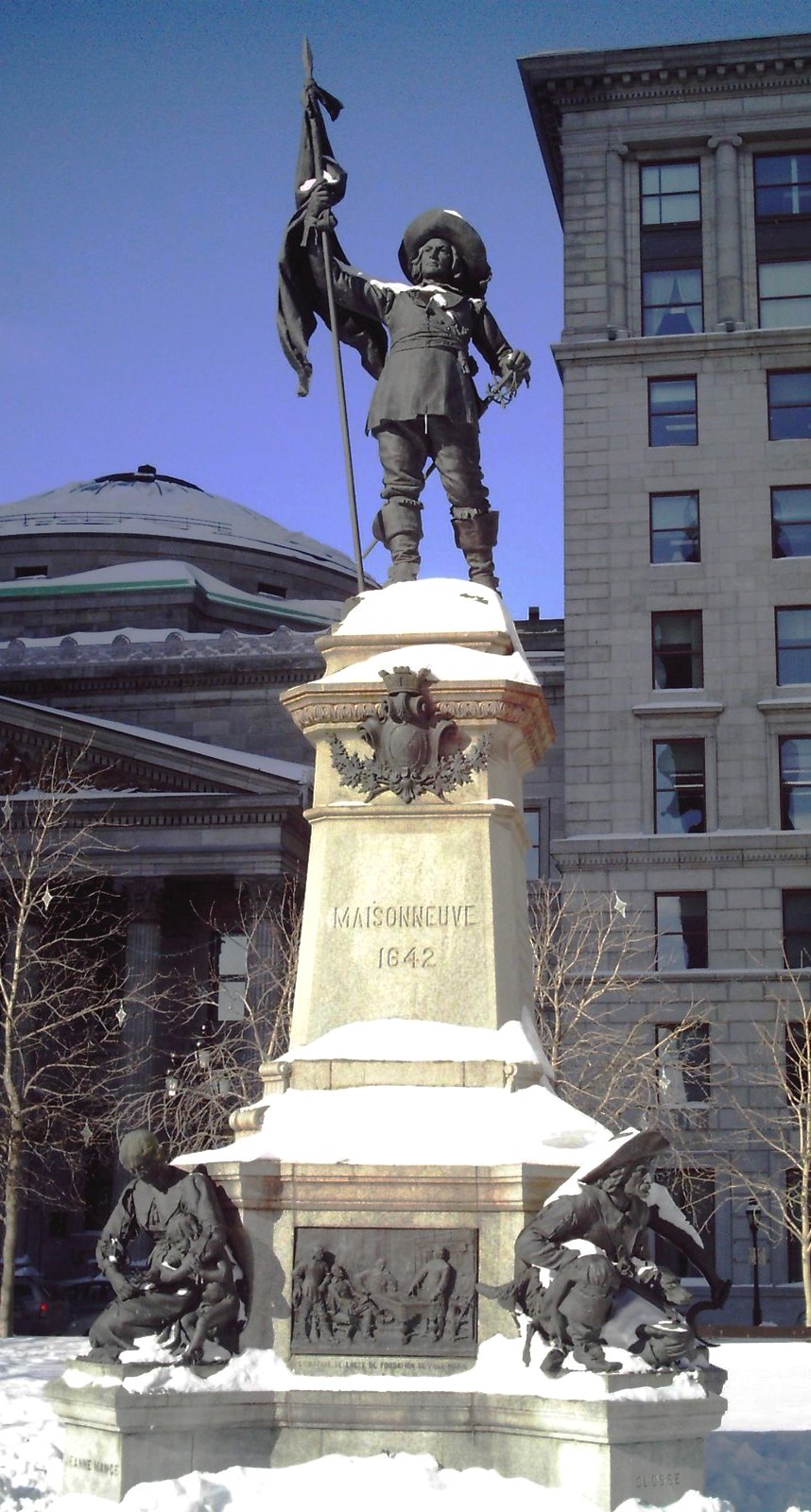
Maisonneuve Monument (1895) was erected in memory of Paul Chomedey de Maisonneuve in the Place d'Armes square Montreal, Quebec.

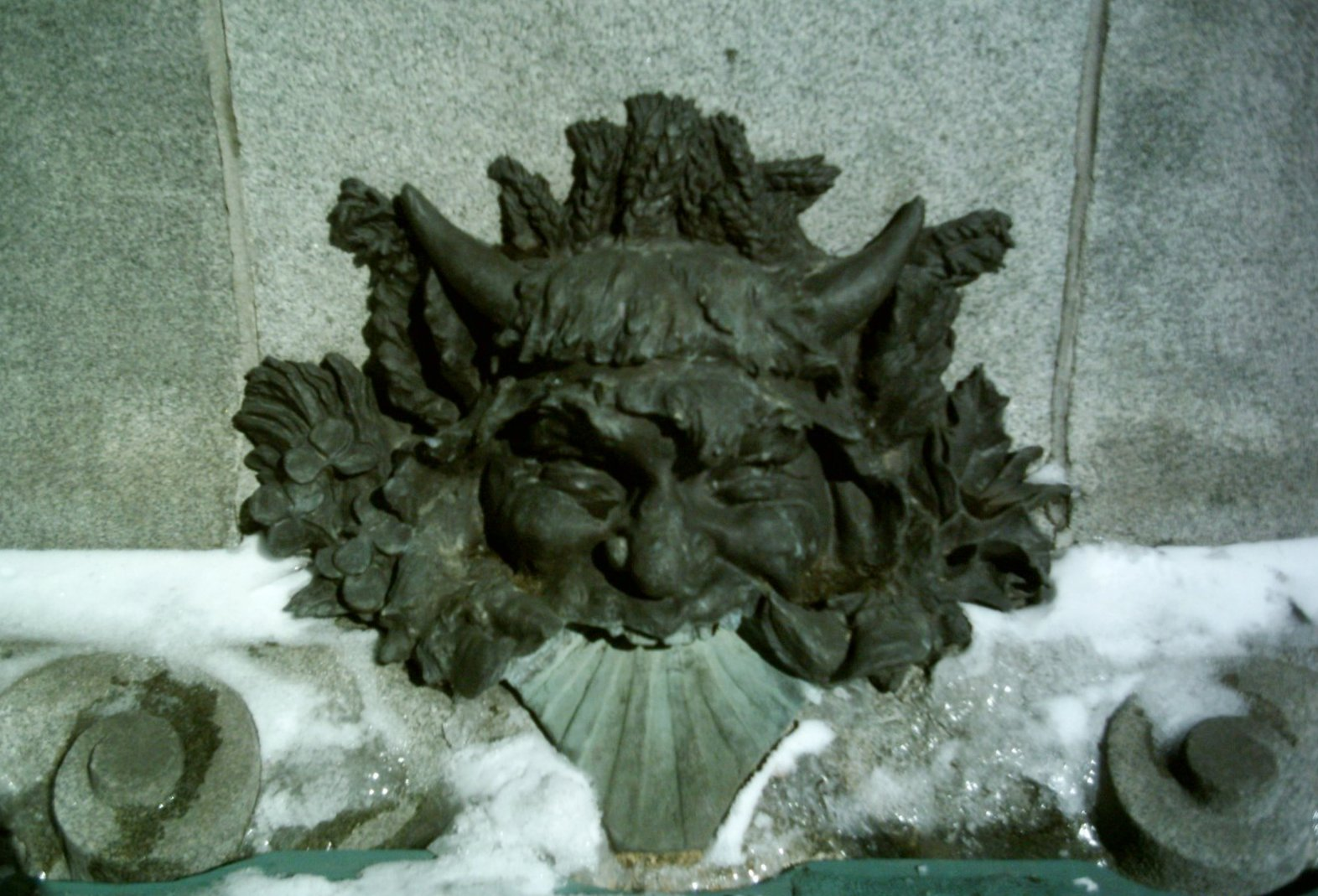
Mascaron.

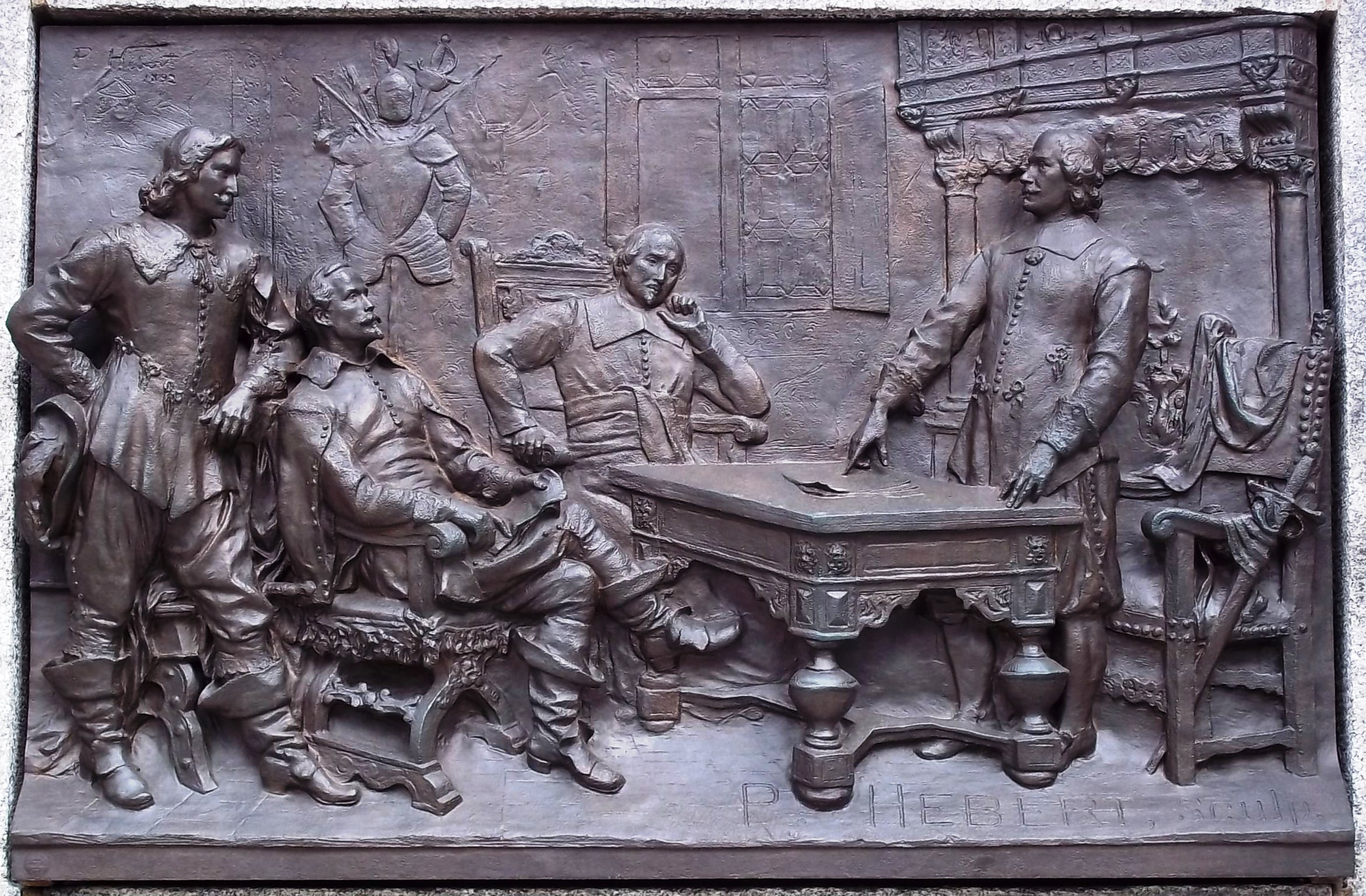
Acte de foundation de Ville-Marie.

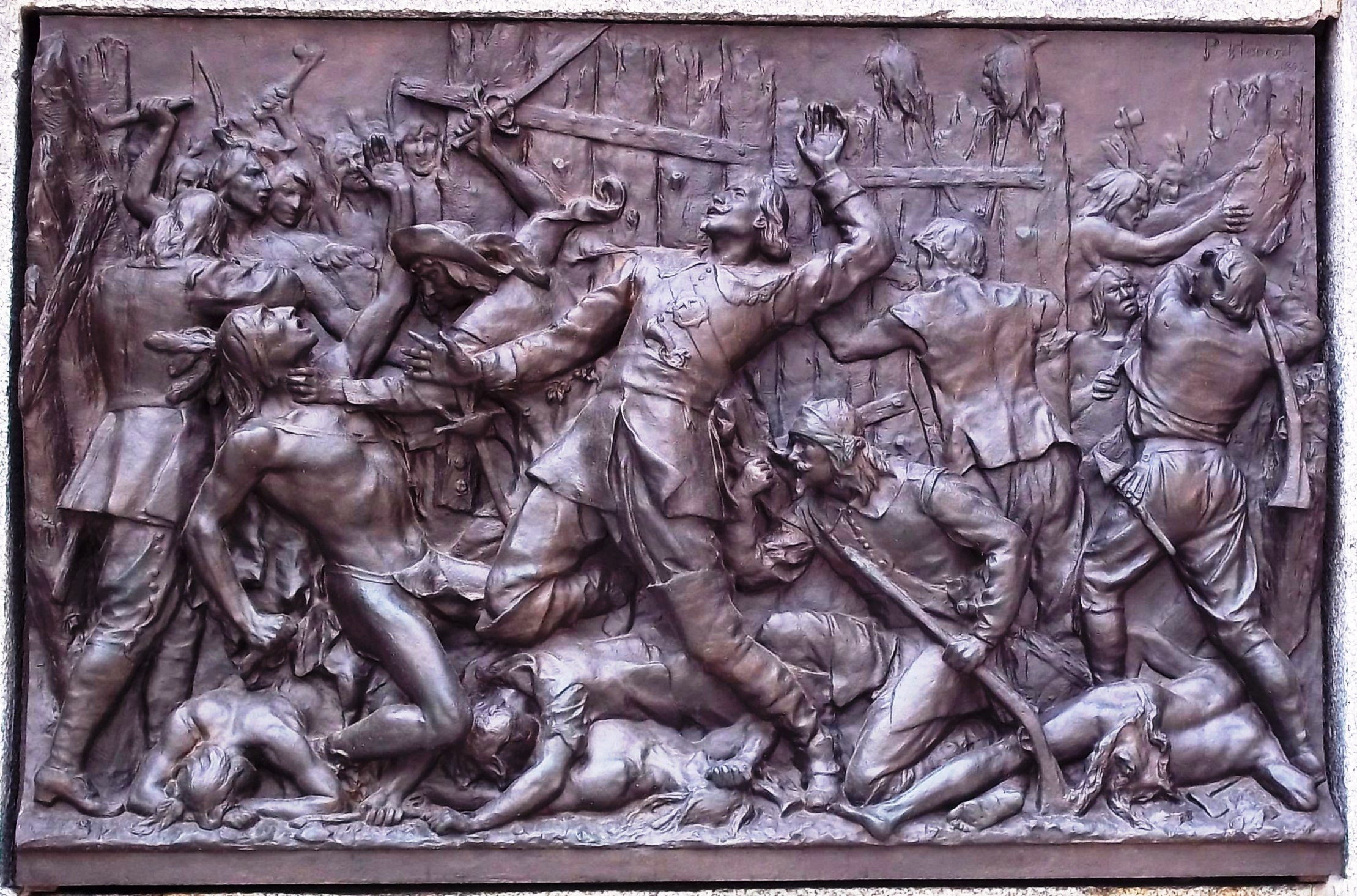
Mort heroique de Dollard au Long Sault.

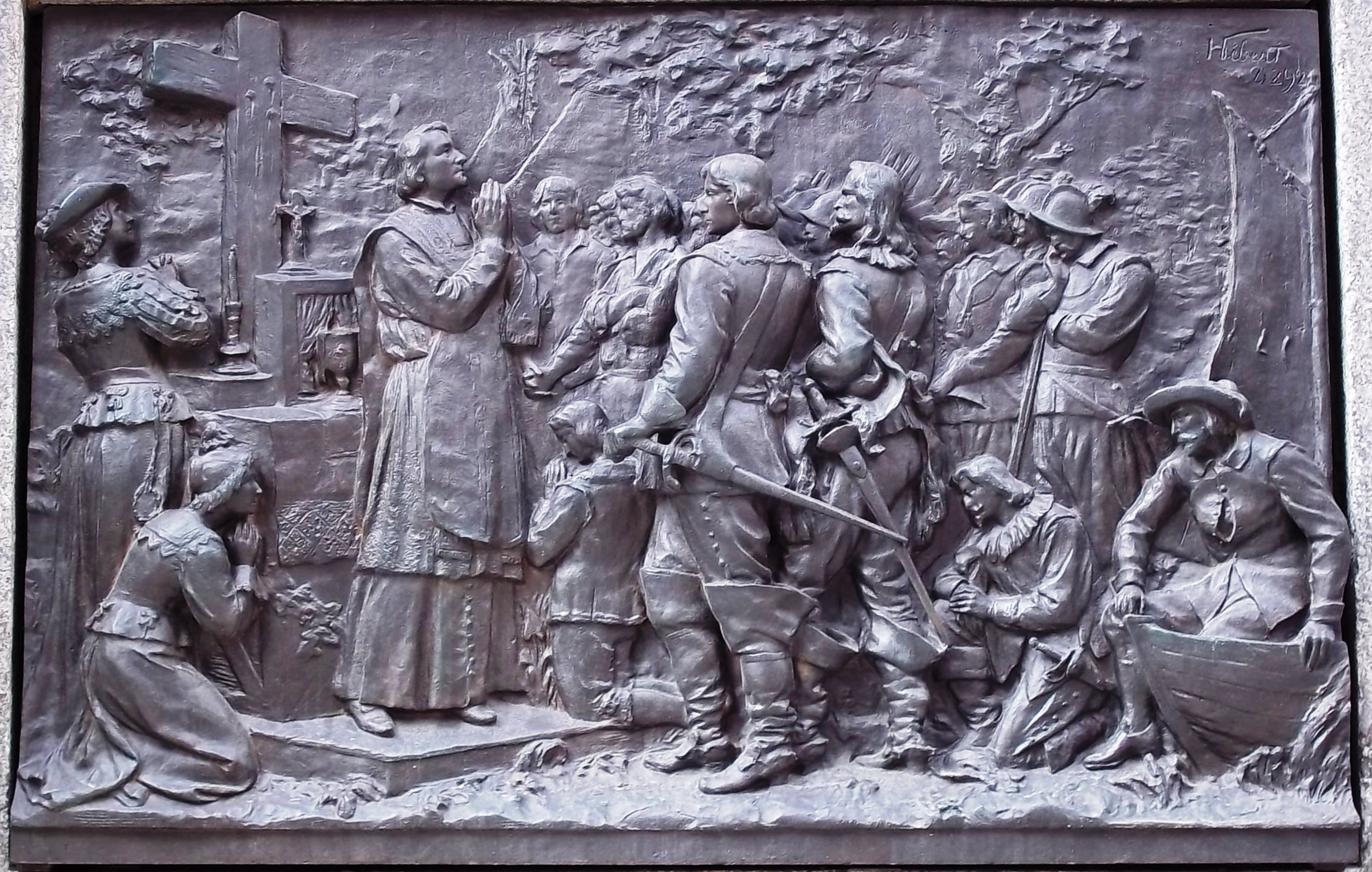
Premiere messe a Ville-Marie.

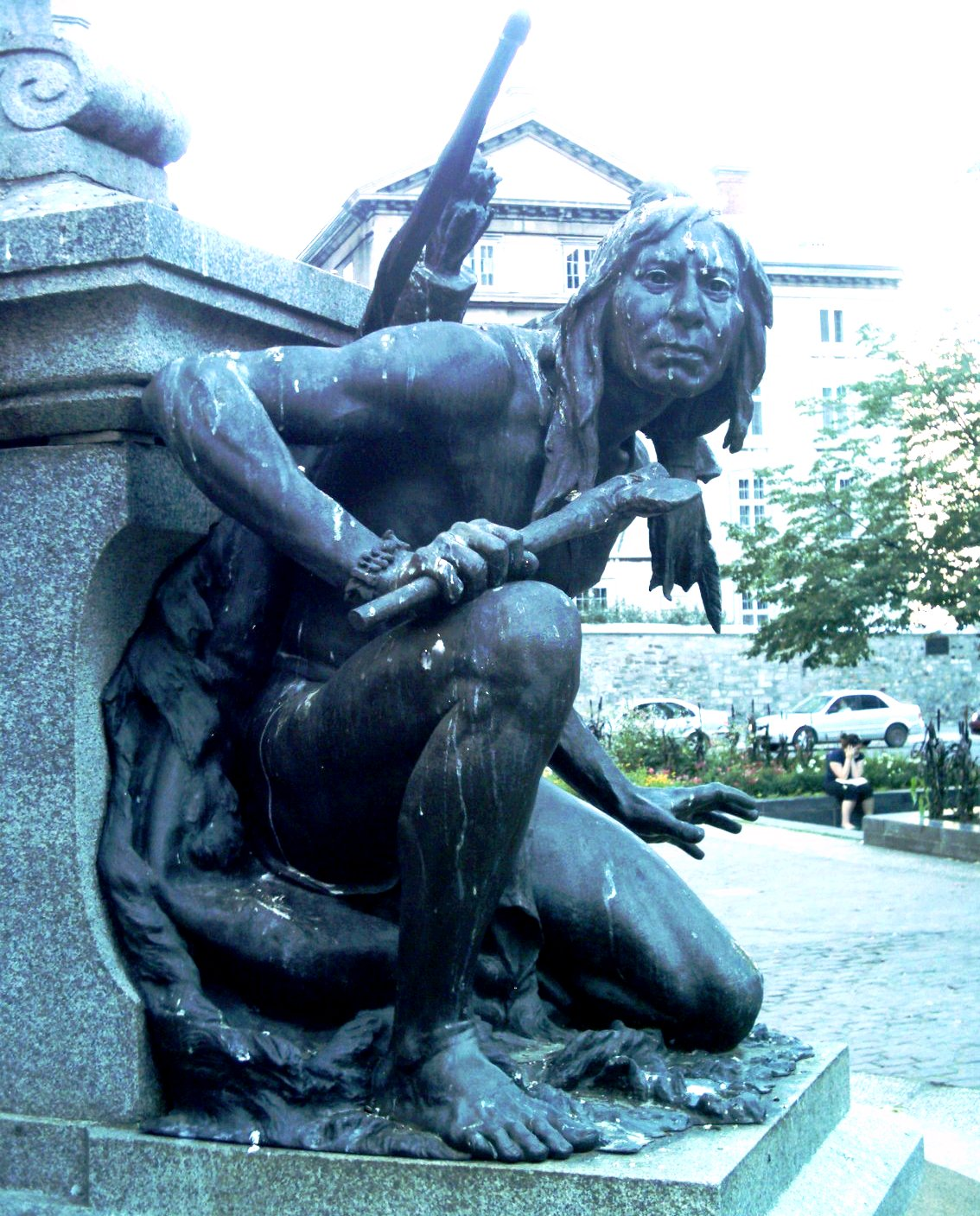
Iroquois.

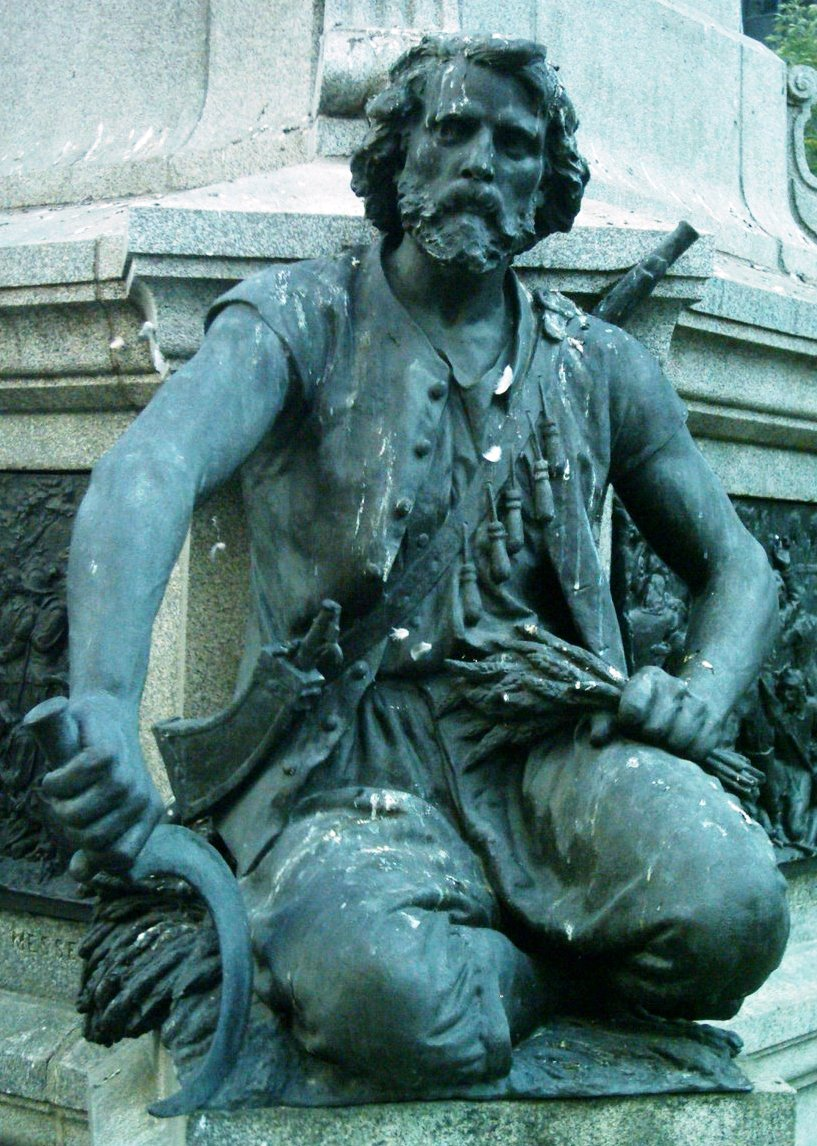
Charles Le Moyne.

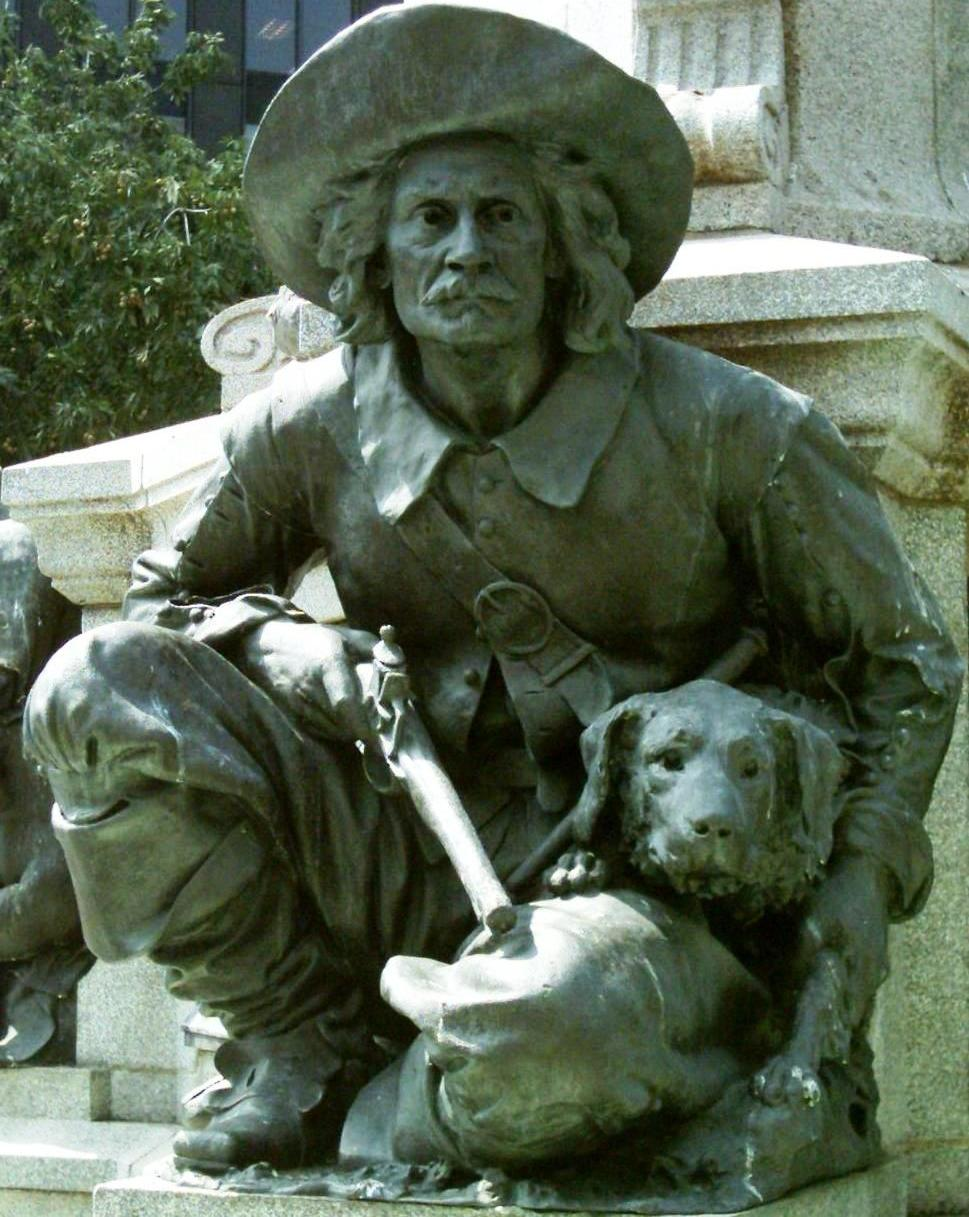
Lambert Closse.

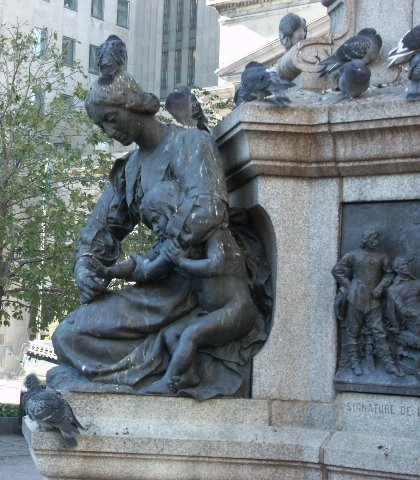
Jeanne Mance.

=== Other ===
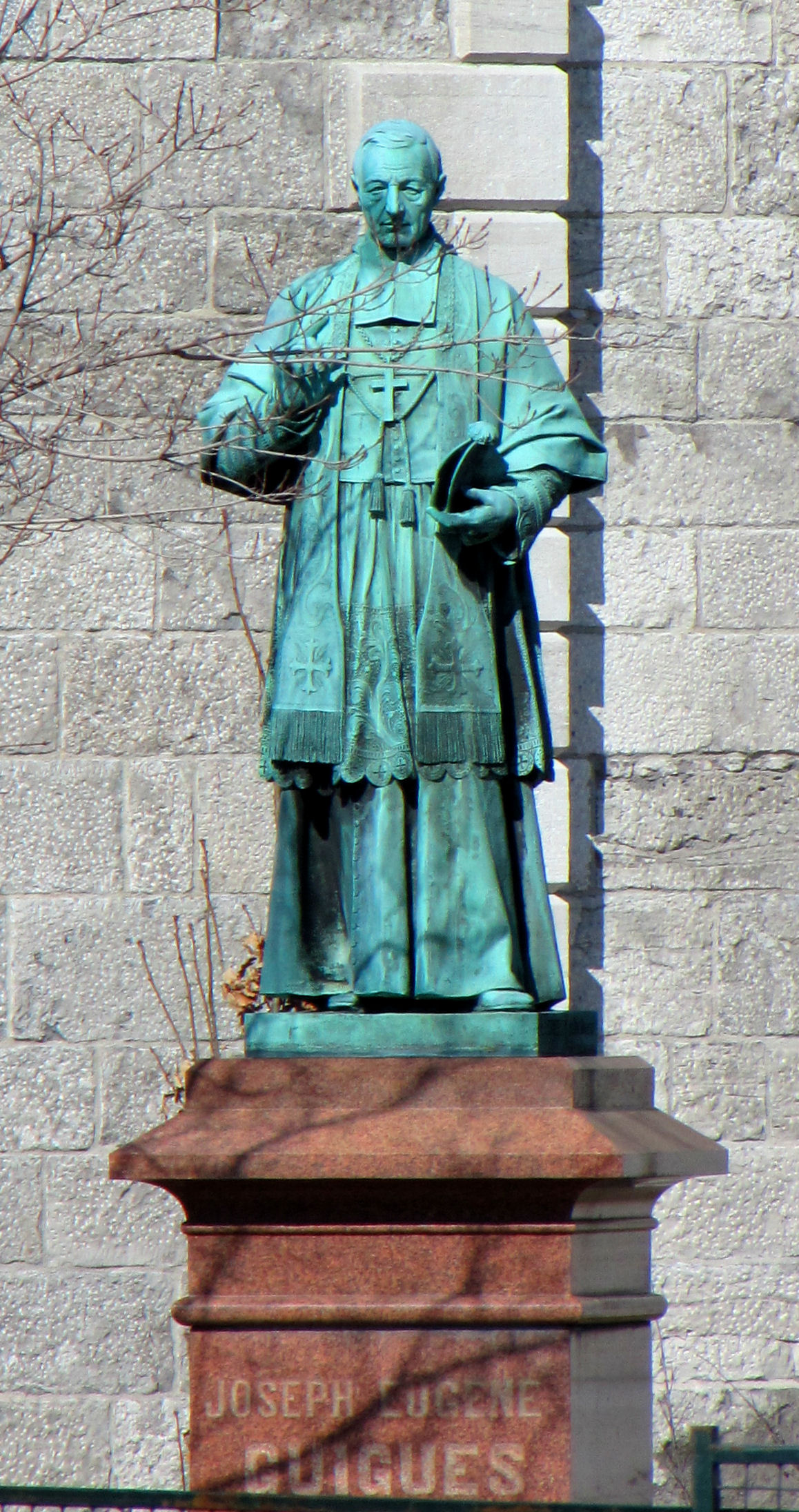
Bishop Joseph Eugene Guiges outside Notre-Dame Cathedral Basilica, Ottawa

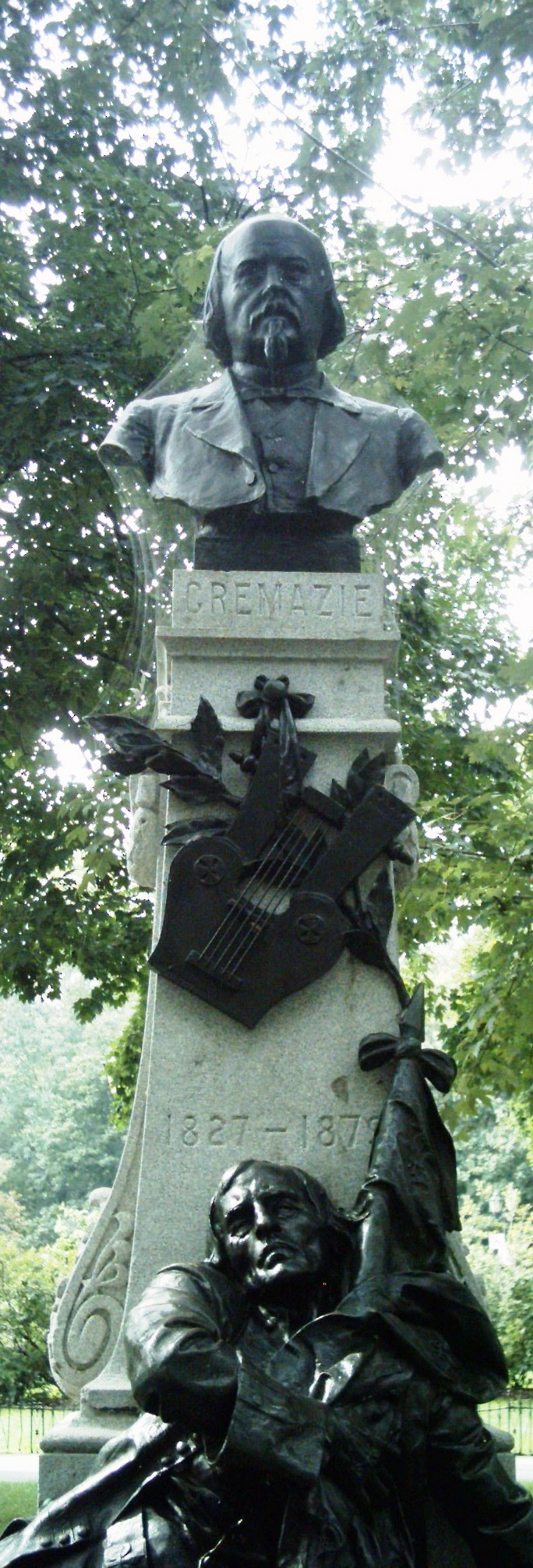
Octave Crémazie Monument near the house of Émile Nelligan

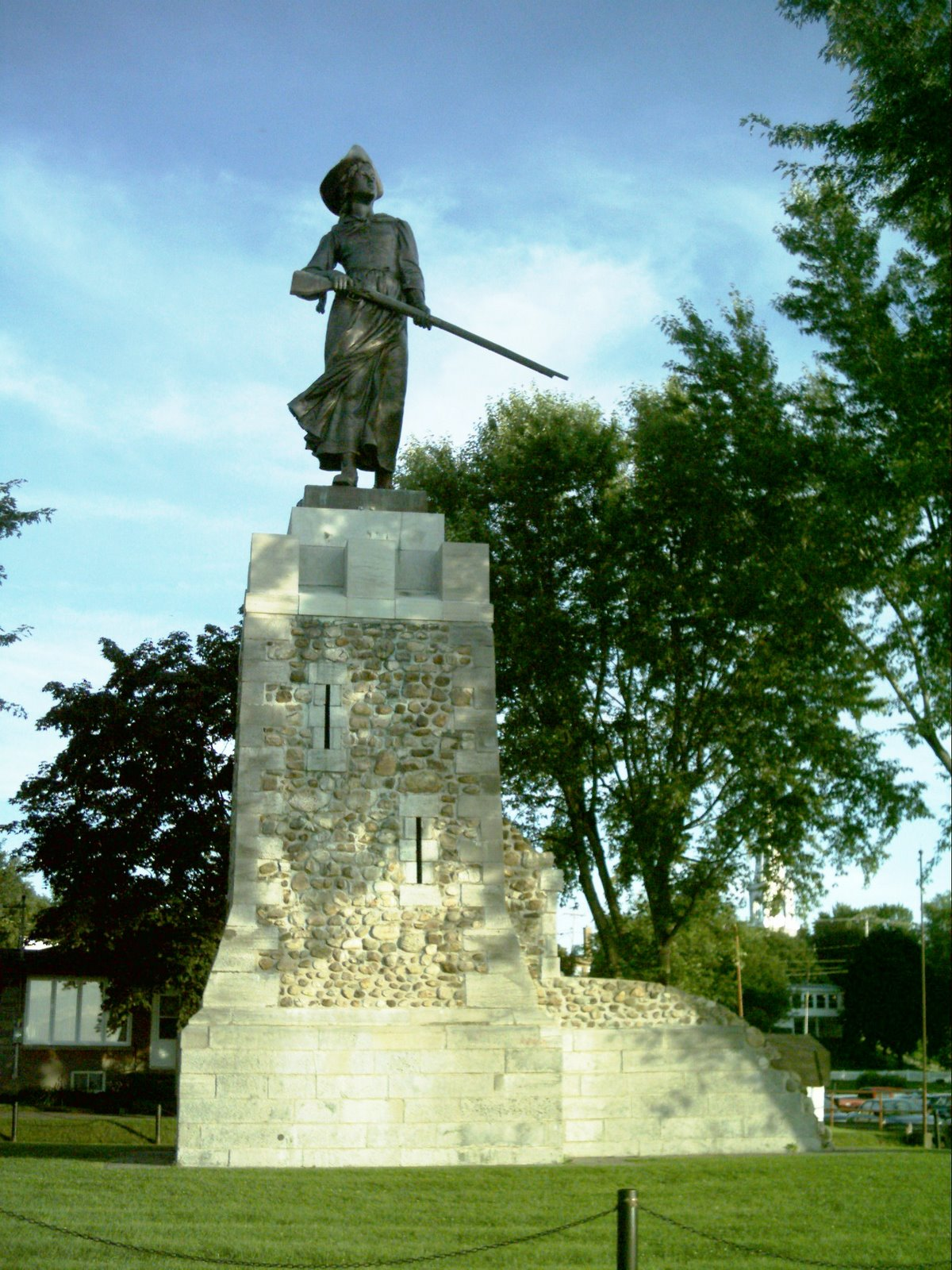
Madeleine de Verchères (1927) was erected in Verchères, Quebec

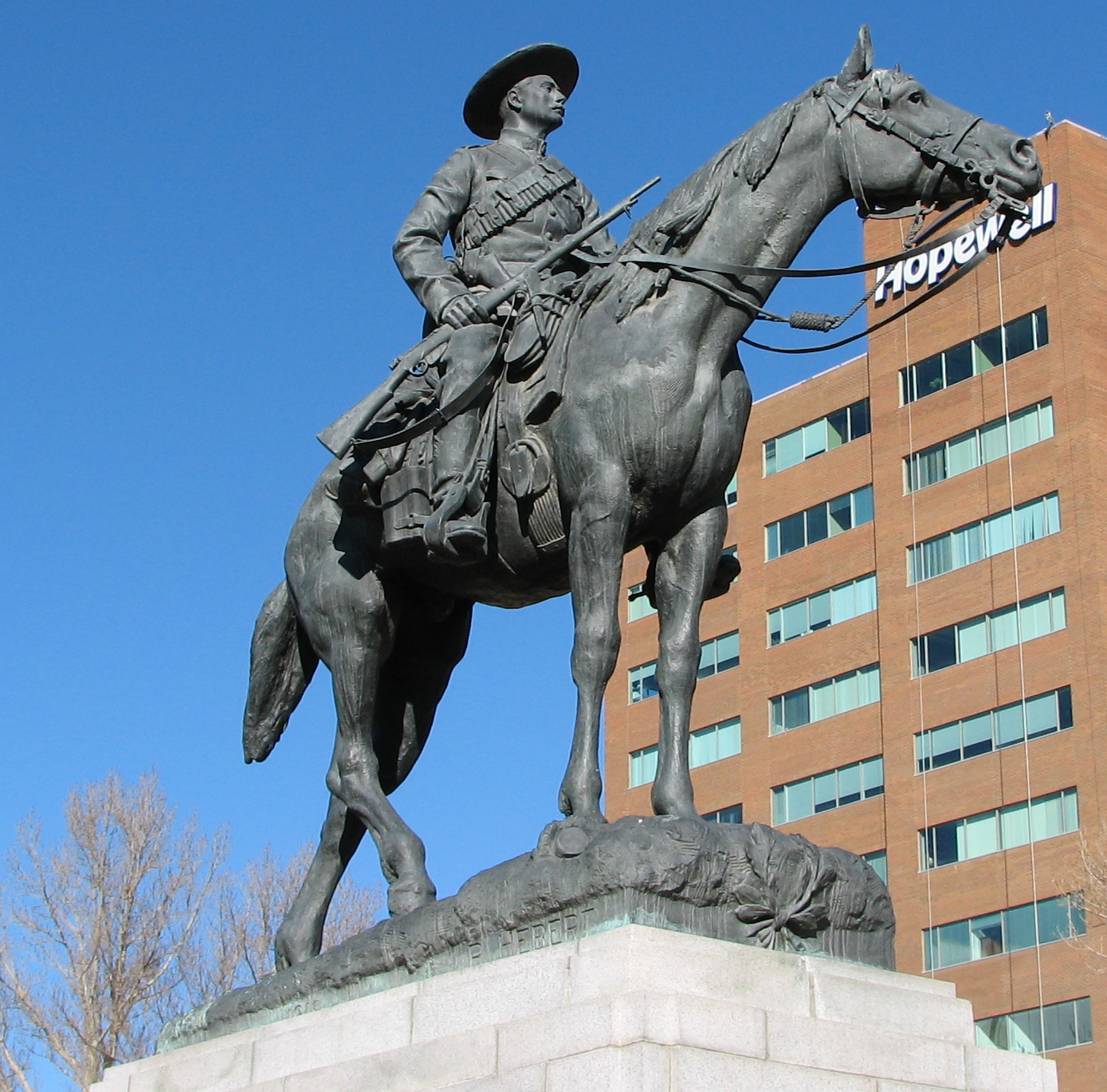
Boer War monument in Central Memorial Park. Calgary, Alberta
- Monseigneur Bourget in Montreal, Quebec.
- Monseigneur de Laval in Quebec, Quebec.
- completed thirty large wooden sculptures in the choir of the Notre-Dame Cathedral Basilica, Ottawa including the Holy Family, John the Baptist and Patrick, the patron saints of English and French Catholics.
- monument at Parliament Hill (Quebec City) to soldiers Short and Wallick (1891), two heroes who saved the inhabitants of the fire at Saint-Sauveur in the lower town of Quebec in 1889)
- monument of Father André Garin, priest at St.-Jean-Baptiste Church, at Lowell, Massachusetts.
