= Edward VII Monument (Montreal) =

Sculpture by Louis-Philippe Hébert

- Monument à Édouard VII
- Interactive map of Edward VII Monument
- Location: Phillips Square
- Coordinates: 45.50372°N 73.56852°W
- Designer: Louis-Philippe Hébert
- Type: Historical Monument
- Material: Bronze, granite
- Height: 14 metres (46 ft)
- Completion date: 1914
- Opening date: October 1, 1914
- Dedicated to: Edward VII

The Edward VII Monument (French: Monument à Édouard VII) is a statue of King Edward VII by artist Louis-Philippe Hébert and located at Phillips Square in Montreal, Quebec, Canada.

== Overview ==
Designed by Louis-Philippe Hébert, the monument to King Edward VII was in 1914 erected in Phillips Square, in front of Morgan's department store. The statue was unveiled on October 1, 1914, by Edward's brother, Governor General Prince Arthur, Duke of Connaught and Strathearn, with a huge crowd in attendance. Edward had visited Montreal in 1860, when he was the Prince of Wales, to open the Victoria Bridge.

Four allegorical figures sit at the base of the monument: Peace is the woman at front, holding an olive branch but keeping a sword hidden in the folds of her skirt. The western group is Four Nations, representing Montreal’s four founding nationalities—French, Scots, Irish, and English—living together in harmony. At the back of the monument, Winged Genius represents liberty; the angel has broken the shackles of religious prejudice and persecution and is intended as a reminder of the King's extended respect and dignity to all his subjects, regardless of race, colour, or creed. Abundance is on the eastern face, representing Canada's material prosperity.

== Gallery ==
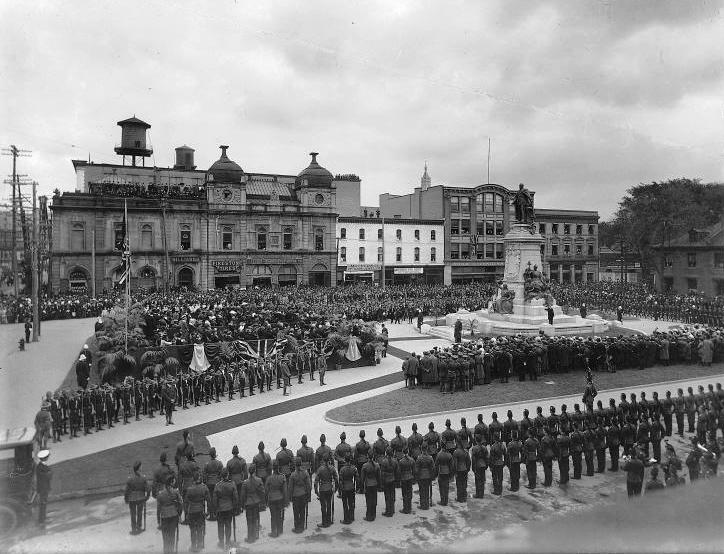
1914

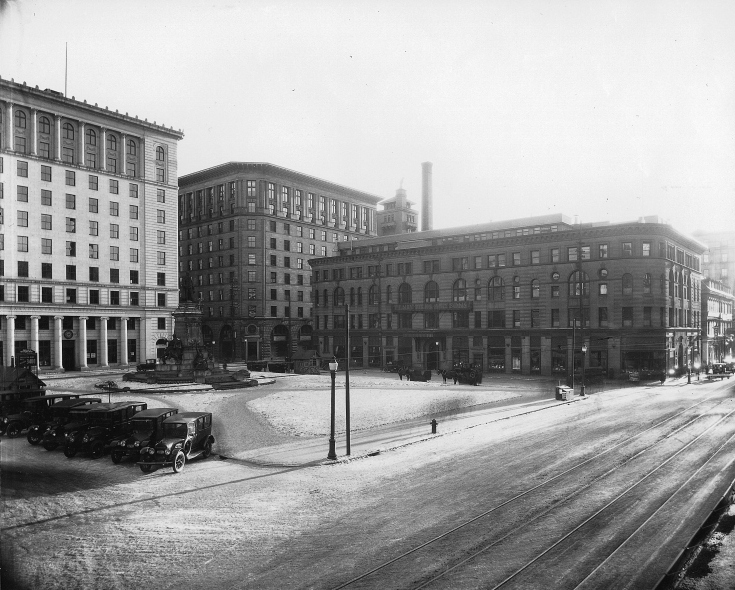
1922

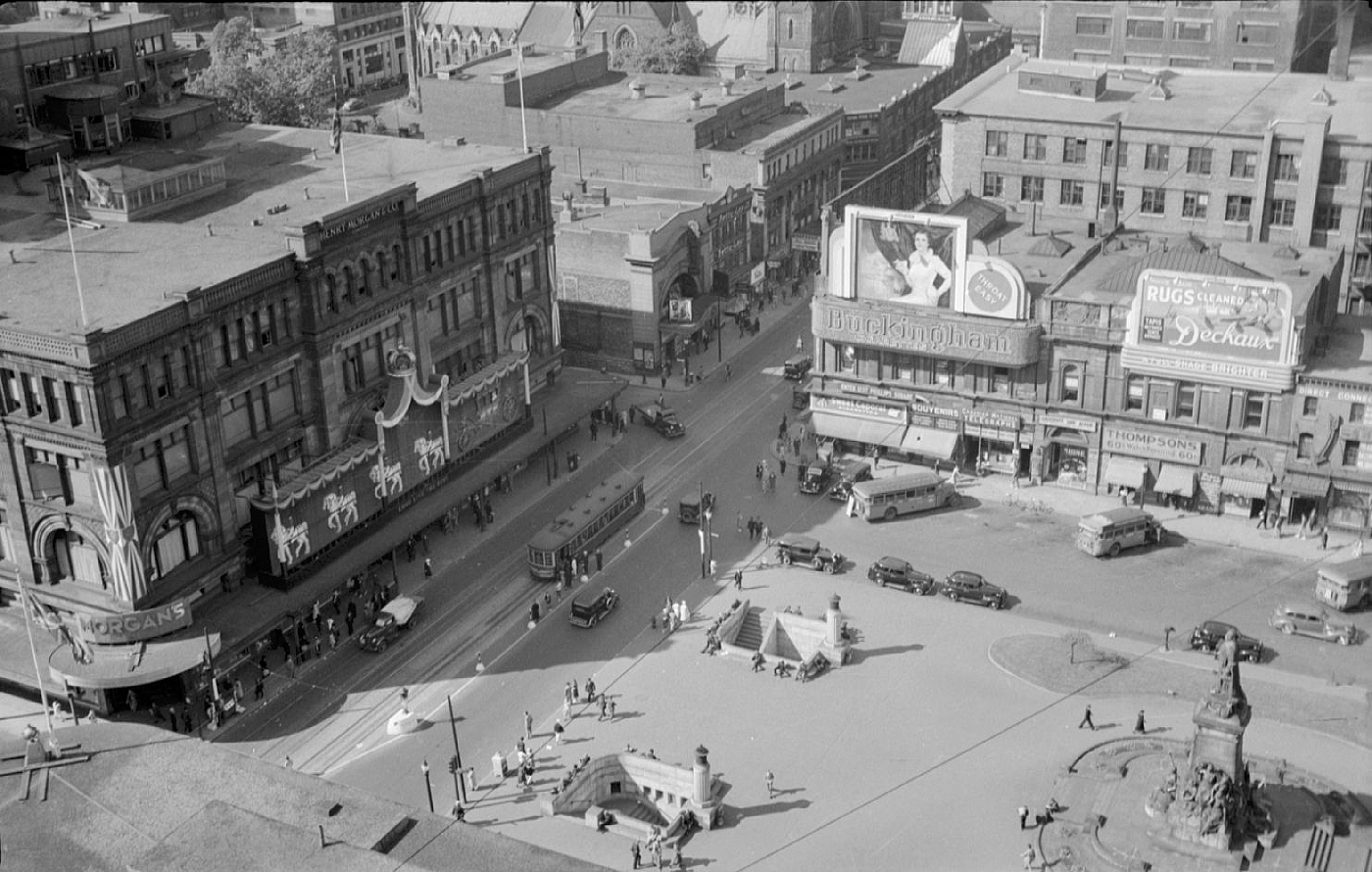
1937

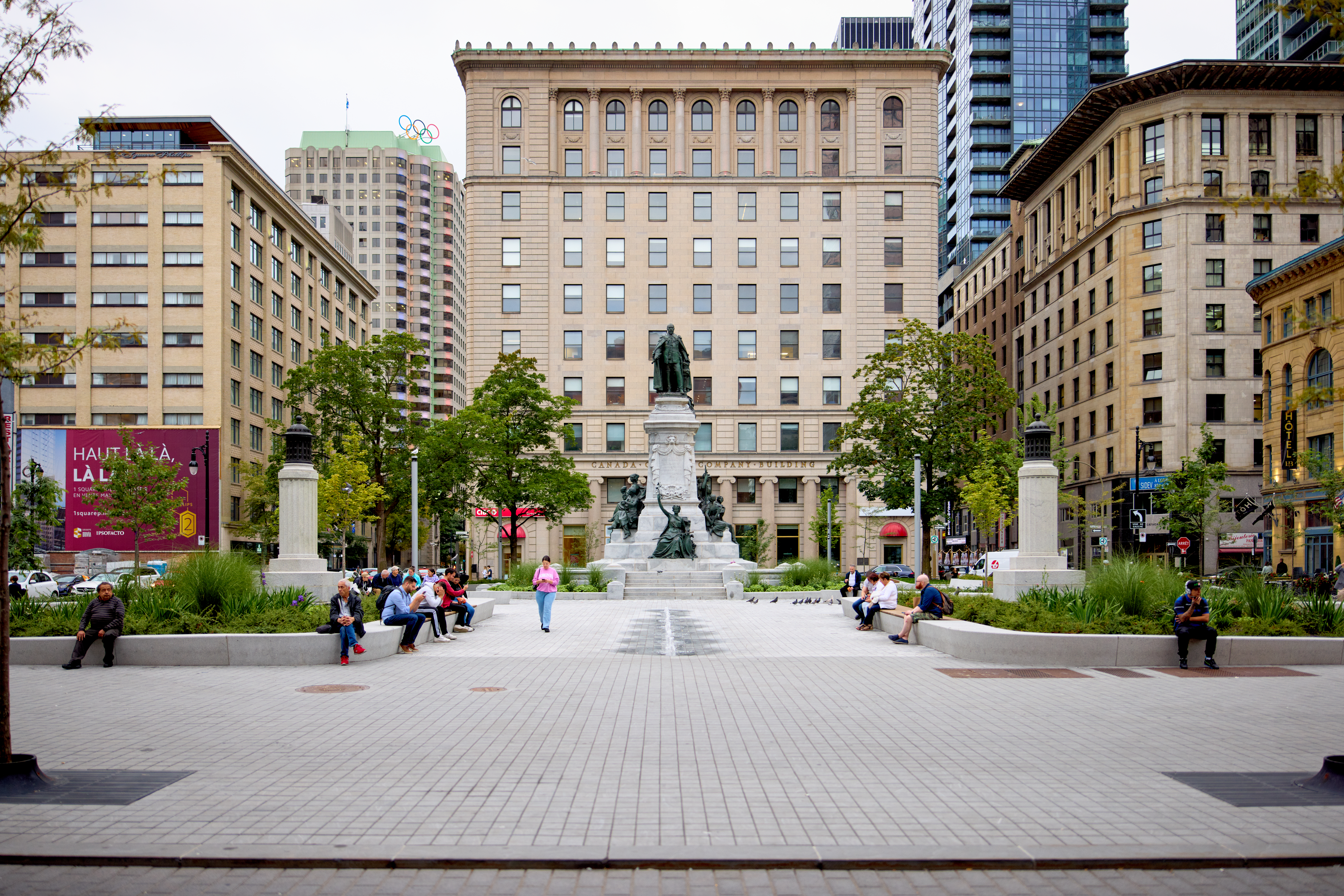
2022
Peace

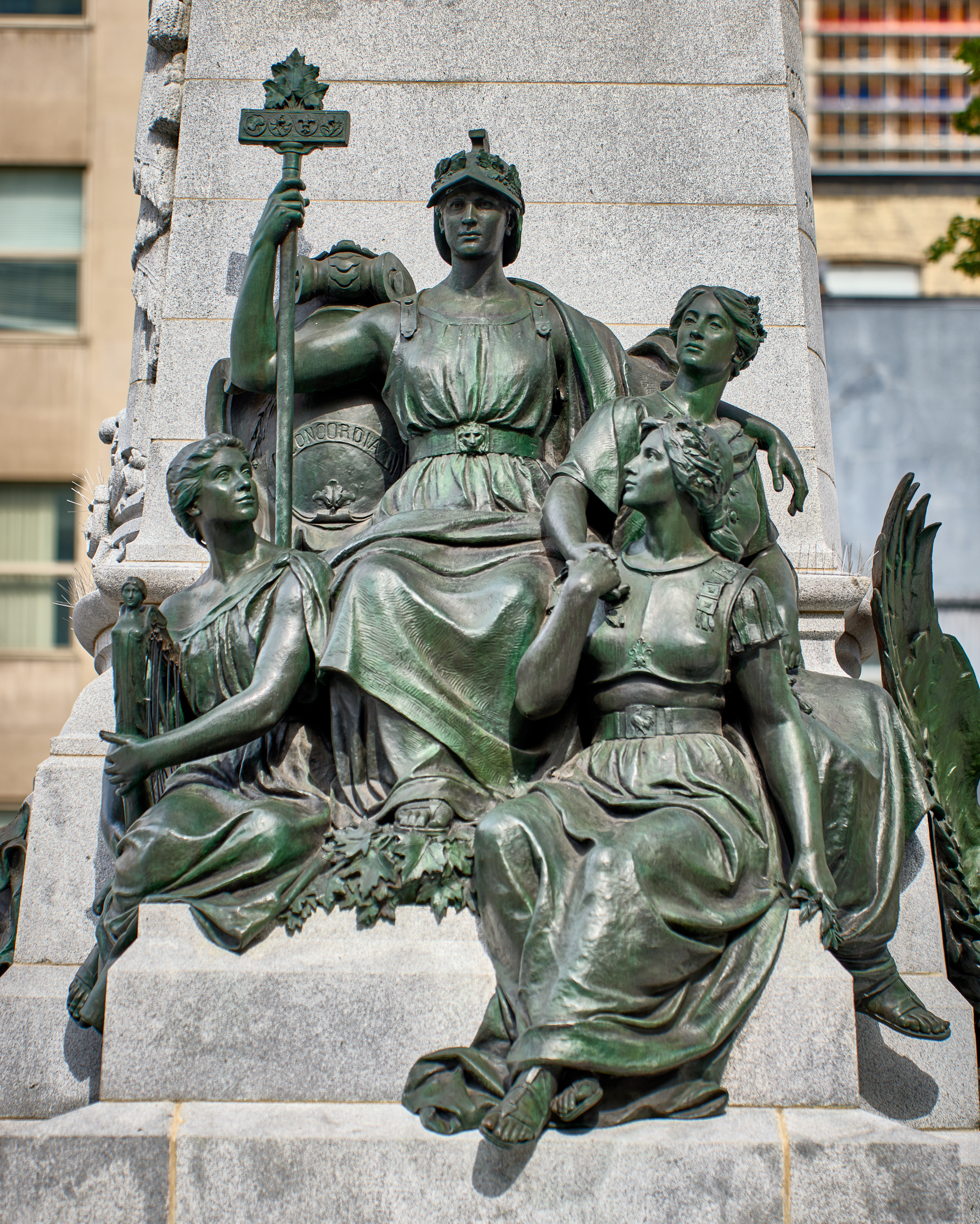
Four Nations

Winged Genius

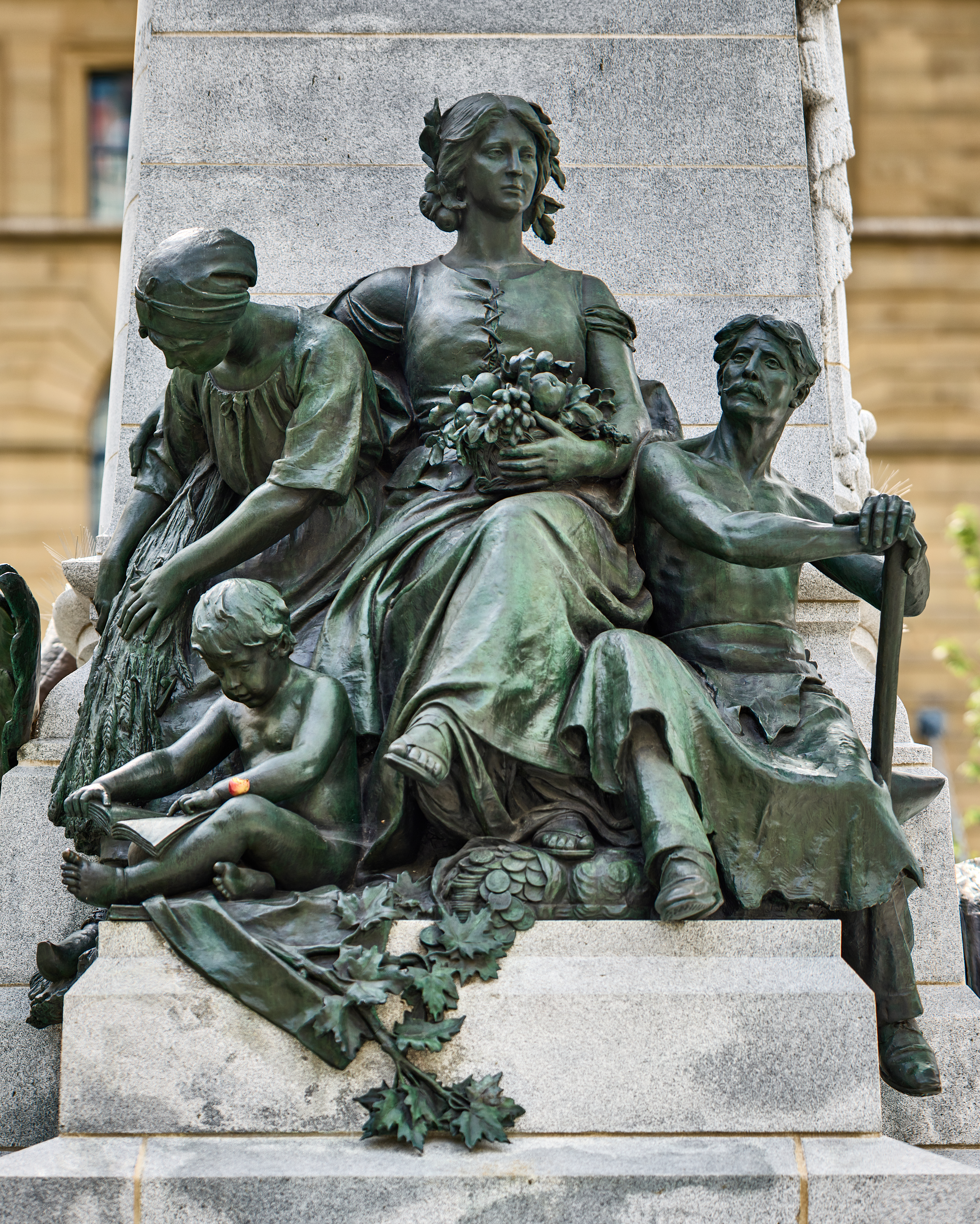
Abundance

== See also ==
- Royal monuments in Canada
