= Phillips Square =

Public square in Montreal

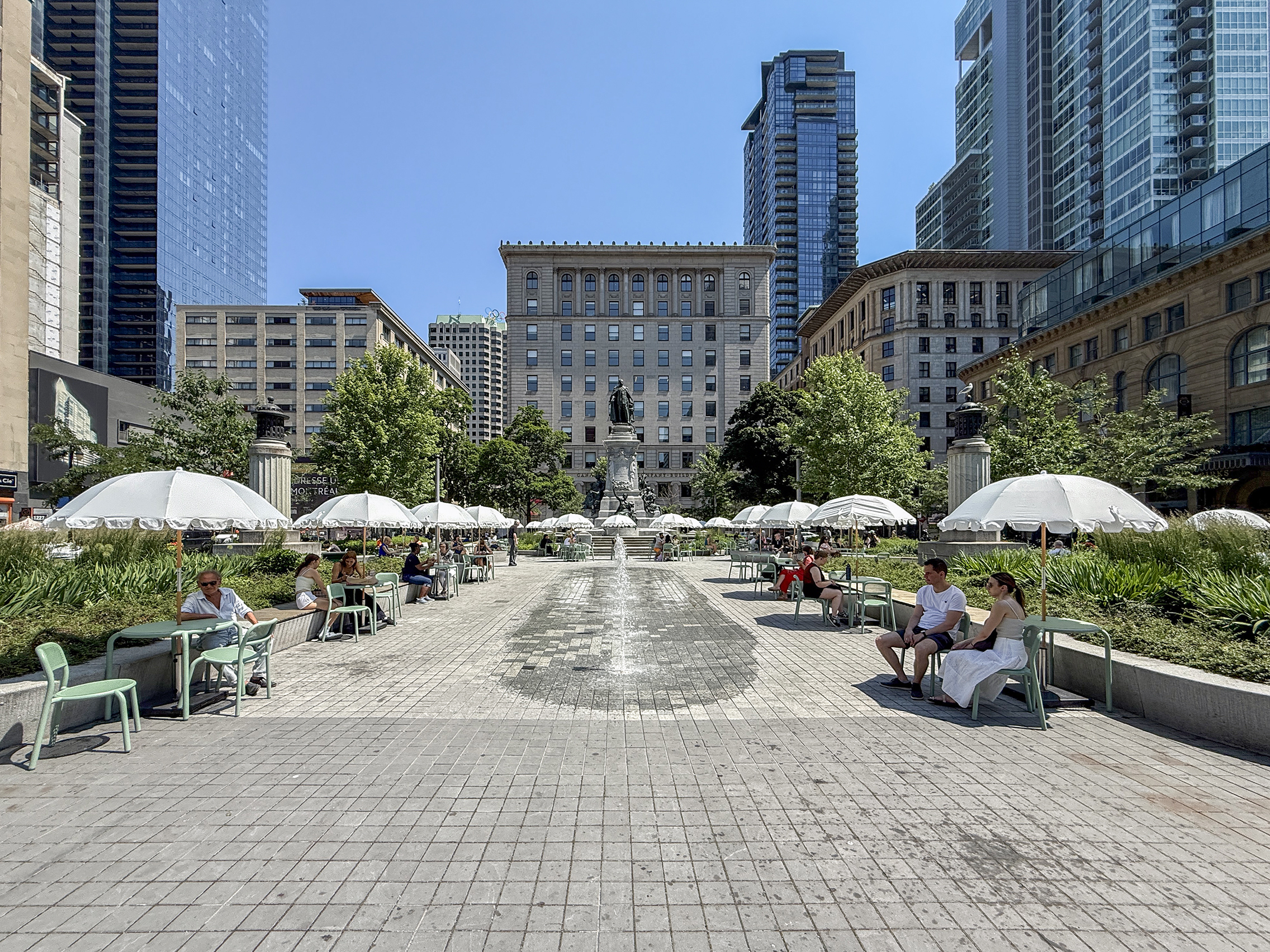
- Plaza in 2026

- Location within Montreal
- Type: Town square
- Location: Downtown Montreal, Ville-Marie Montreal, Quebec, Canada
- Coordinates: 45°30′13″N 73°34′07″W
- Created: 1842
- Operator: City of Montreal
- Status: Open all year

Phillips Square is a public square located in Downtown Montreal, Quebec, Canada. The Square was established in 1842 thanks to a gift from Thomas Phillips to the city of Montreal, with the stipulation that the lot be used solely as a park.

== History ==
In 1842, the square was first laid out in what was then a wealthy residential area on the fringe of the city of Montreal. The first merchant to open a business on Phillips Square was Alfred Joyce, a quality caterer and confectioner and one-time mayor of the town of Outremont who built an elegant shop on the south side of the square in 1878. In 1891, Morgan's department store established itself on the north side of the square. That site is of particular interest to visitors from the United States because Confederate President Jefferson Davis sent his family to live in Montreal during the American Civil War. A brass plaque installed on the west side of the store, today called The Bay, (Note: Morgan's was bought by the Hudson's Bay Company in the 1960s and the store with the brass plaque began operating as The Bay and continued to do so until its dissolution in 2025.) was dedicated to his memory. Davis came in 1867 to stay in John Lovell’s house, which then stood on the site. The plaque was removed in 2017.

The head office of Henry Birks and Sons was built soon after on the west side of the square in 1894. The fast food outlet on the corner of the east side of Phillips Square was the site of Montreal’s first art gallery, which was inaugurated by the governor general of Canada, Sir John Campbell, 9th Duke of Argyll (also known as the Marquis of Lorne) in 1879. When its collection grew, it eventually moved to the present-day Montreal Museum of Fine Arts. On the south side of the square, where Alfred Joyce once had his pastry shop, is the Canada Cement Building, built in 1921. Designed by Barott and Blackader, the dignified 10-storey building was the first office tower to be built completely of reinforced concrete. Canada Cement was founded by Max Aitken, later Lord Beaverbrook, and Barott convinced him to use concrete in the building of his head office to advertise his cement-based products. The building was considered avant-garde when it opened because it was the first skyscraper in Montreal to have an underground parking garage, and there were then only a few automobiles on the road.

In 2017, the square was incorporated into the Promenade Fleuve-Montagne, a 3.8 km pedestrian route and interpretive trail linking the St. Lawrence River to Mount Royal, created as part of the 375th anniversary of Montreal.

On August 31, 2012, a memorial to the victims of the Blue Bird Café fire, which occurred nearby in 1972, was unveiled by the city of Montreal on the south side of the square to mark the 40th anniversary of the tragedy.

In 2022, Provencher_Roy transformed part of Sainte-Catherine Street West into a pedestrian oriented hub. At the heart of the project sits Phillips Square a newly expanded public space. The plan eliminates street parking and drastically widens the sidewalks, flipping the proportion of space allocated to cars and pedestrians to turn it into a place for people. Bronze plates in the street serve as urban markers, identifying the grand turn-of-the-century department stores and commercial buildings that lend this area its storied heritage. The design also recenters Phillips Square as an integral part of the downtown core as envisioned in the 1841 Phillips Plan. A contemporary interpretation of the English Garden Square, the space is newly expanded thanks to wider sidewalks, lush plantings and open sightlines, which offer picturesque views over the built environment and surrounding landscape. The monument to Edward VII is showcased with new uplighting, surrounded by integrated urban furniture and a programmable water feature. In addition, the project increases vegetation in the Square by 46% and plants 14 times the number of current trees.

New sustainable features include:

- A low-level irrigation system for flower beds
- Stormwater reuse and recirculation for water features
- High-albedo local materials to reduce heat islands
- LED lighting to reduce light pollution
- Signature urban furniture by industrial designer Michel Dallaire

== Monuments ==
The square features a bronze monument of King Edward VII, who ruled from 1901 to 1910. He visited Montreal in 1860, while he was still the Prince of Wales, and opened the Victoria Bridge. The statue was designed by Louis-Philippe Hébert and was erected in 1914 as a gift from the Birks family, four years after Edward VII's death. The four allegorical figures at the base of the monument represent Peace, the Four Founding Nations, Abundance, and Liberty.

== Gallery ==
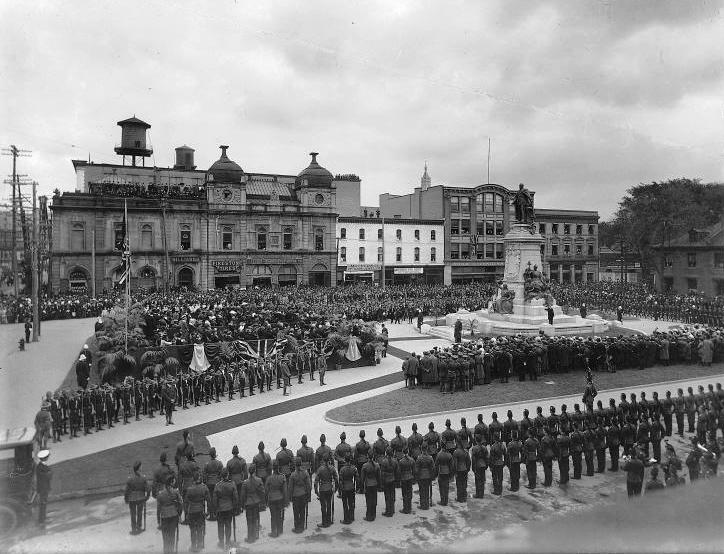
1914

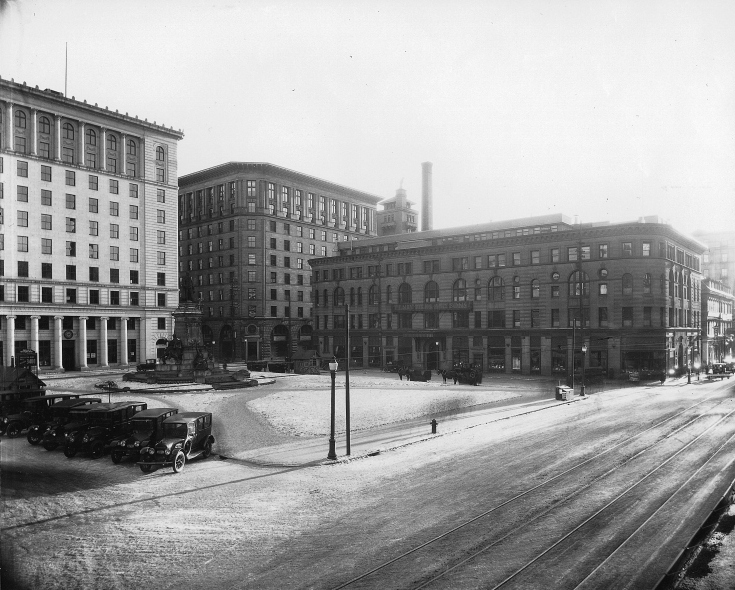
1922

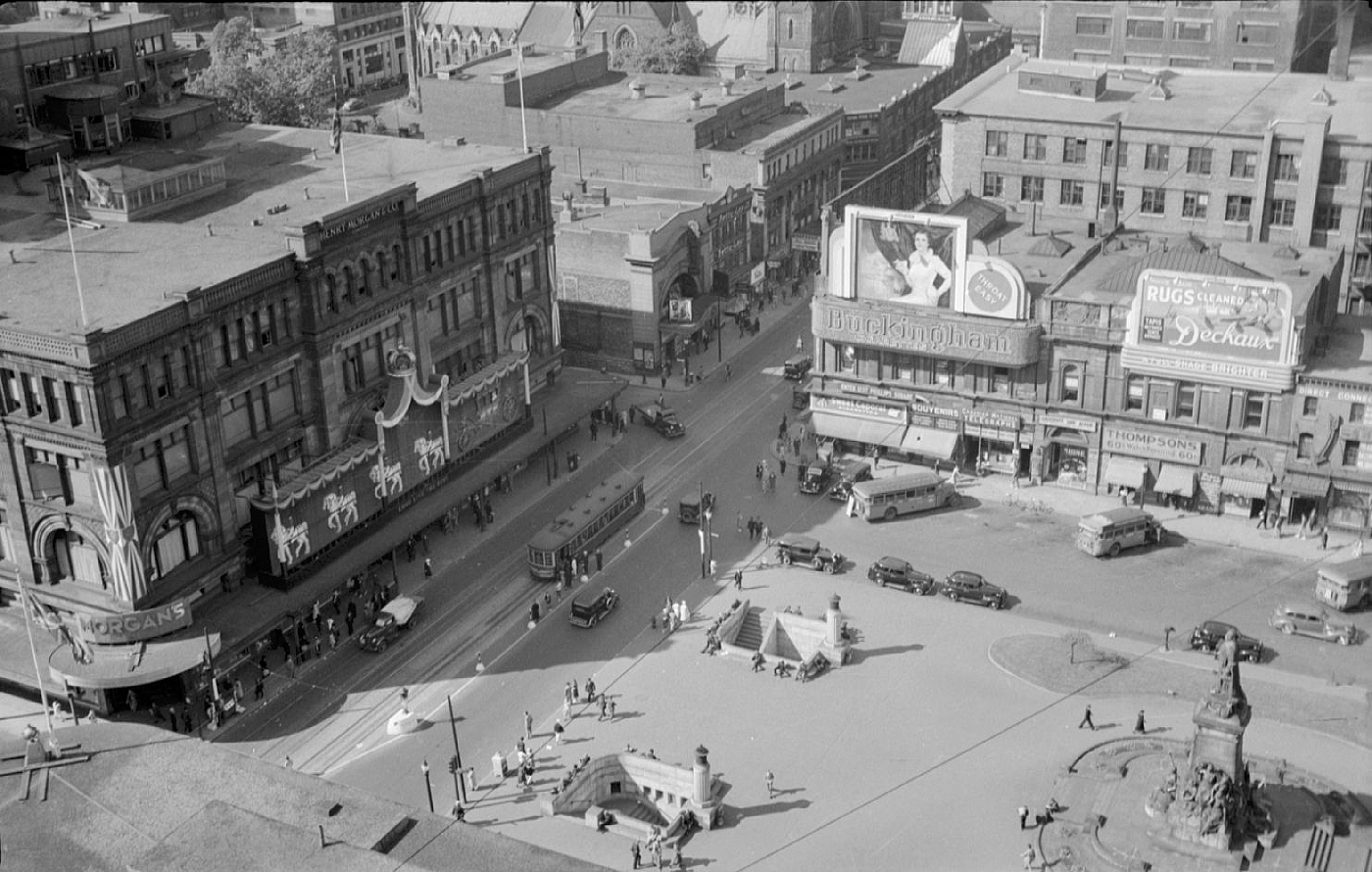
1937

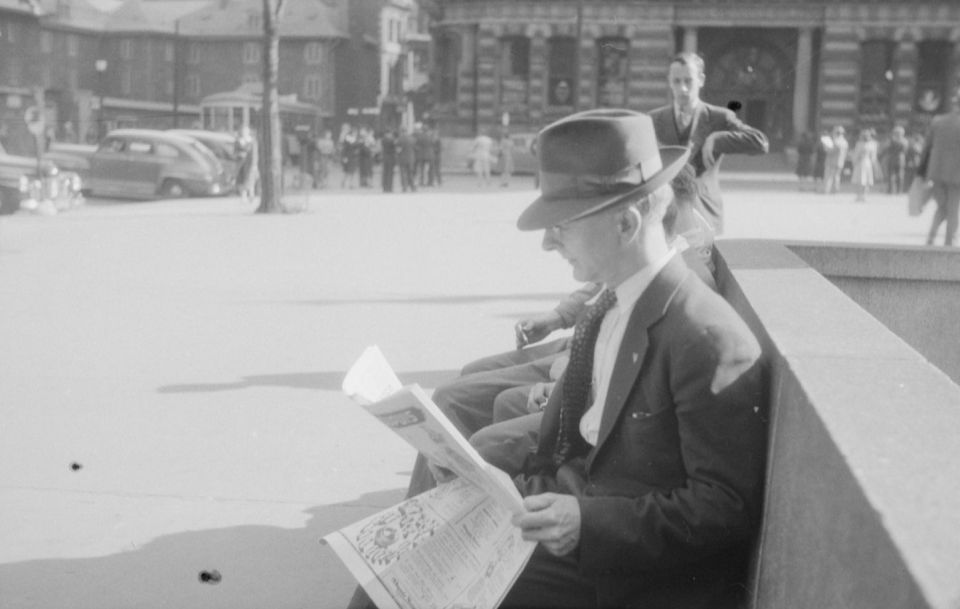
1943
Edward VII Monument in Phillips Square

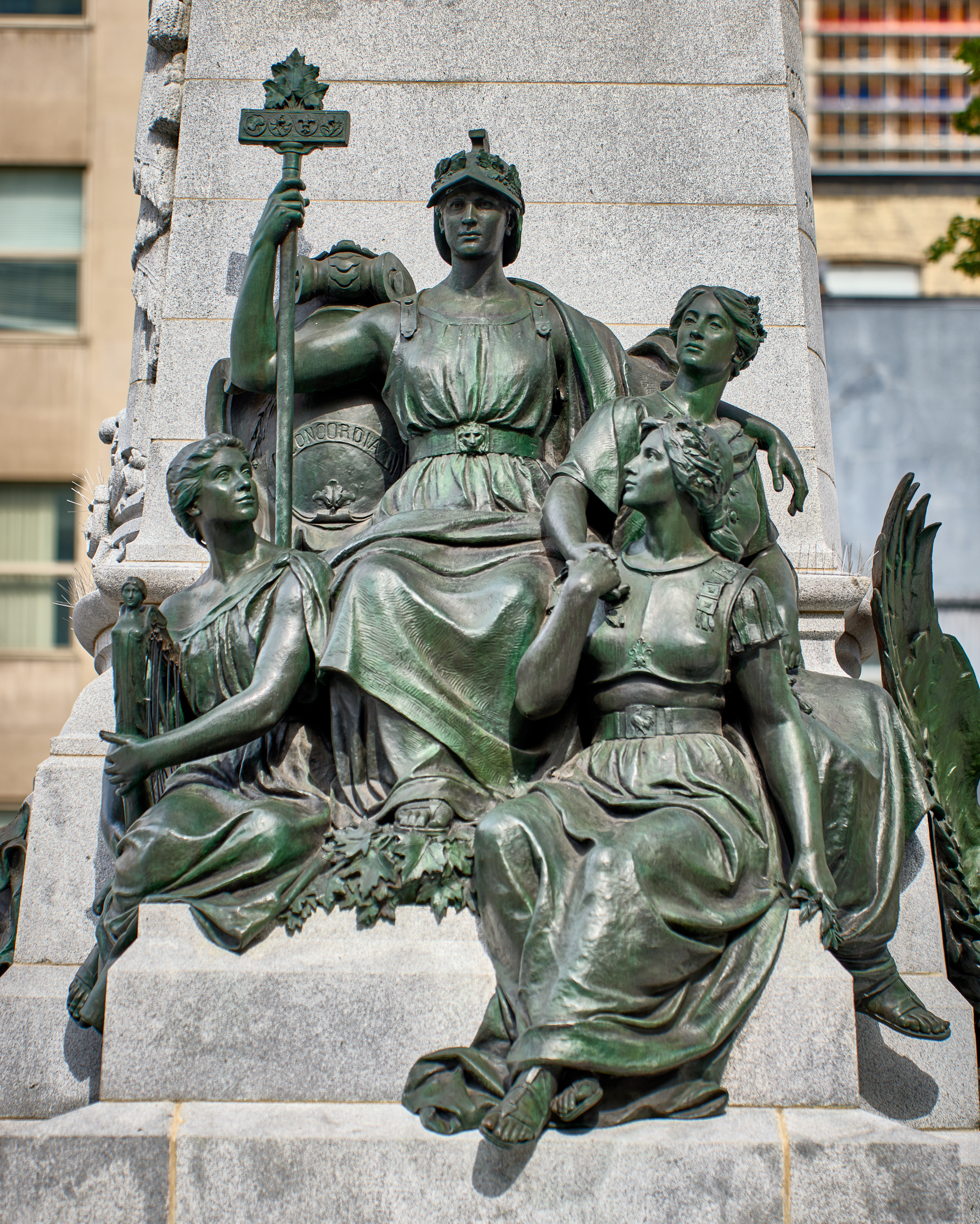
Four Nations

Winged Genius

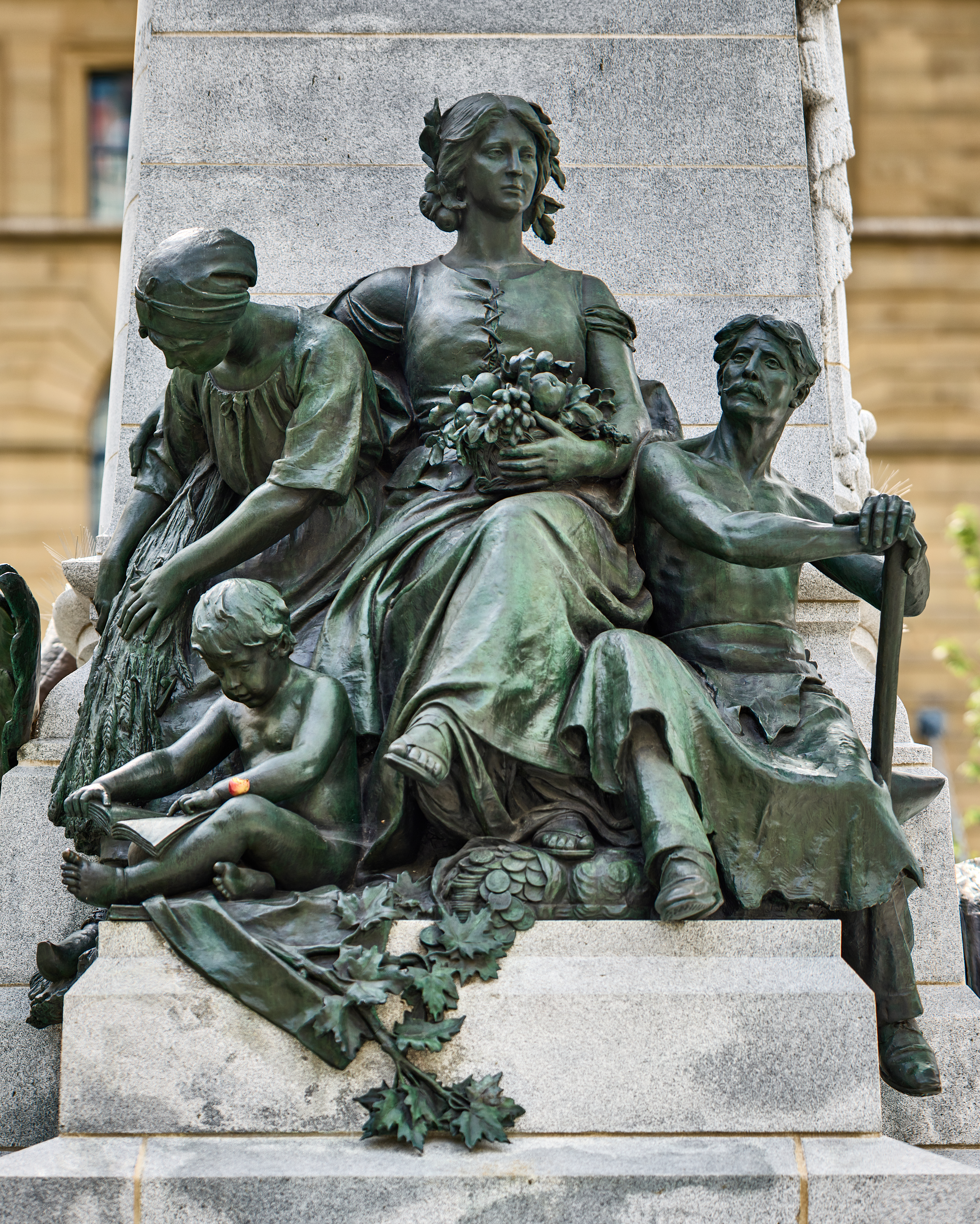
Abundance

Peace
