= René-Lévesque Park =

Urban park in Montreal, Canada

- Parc René-Lévesque
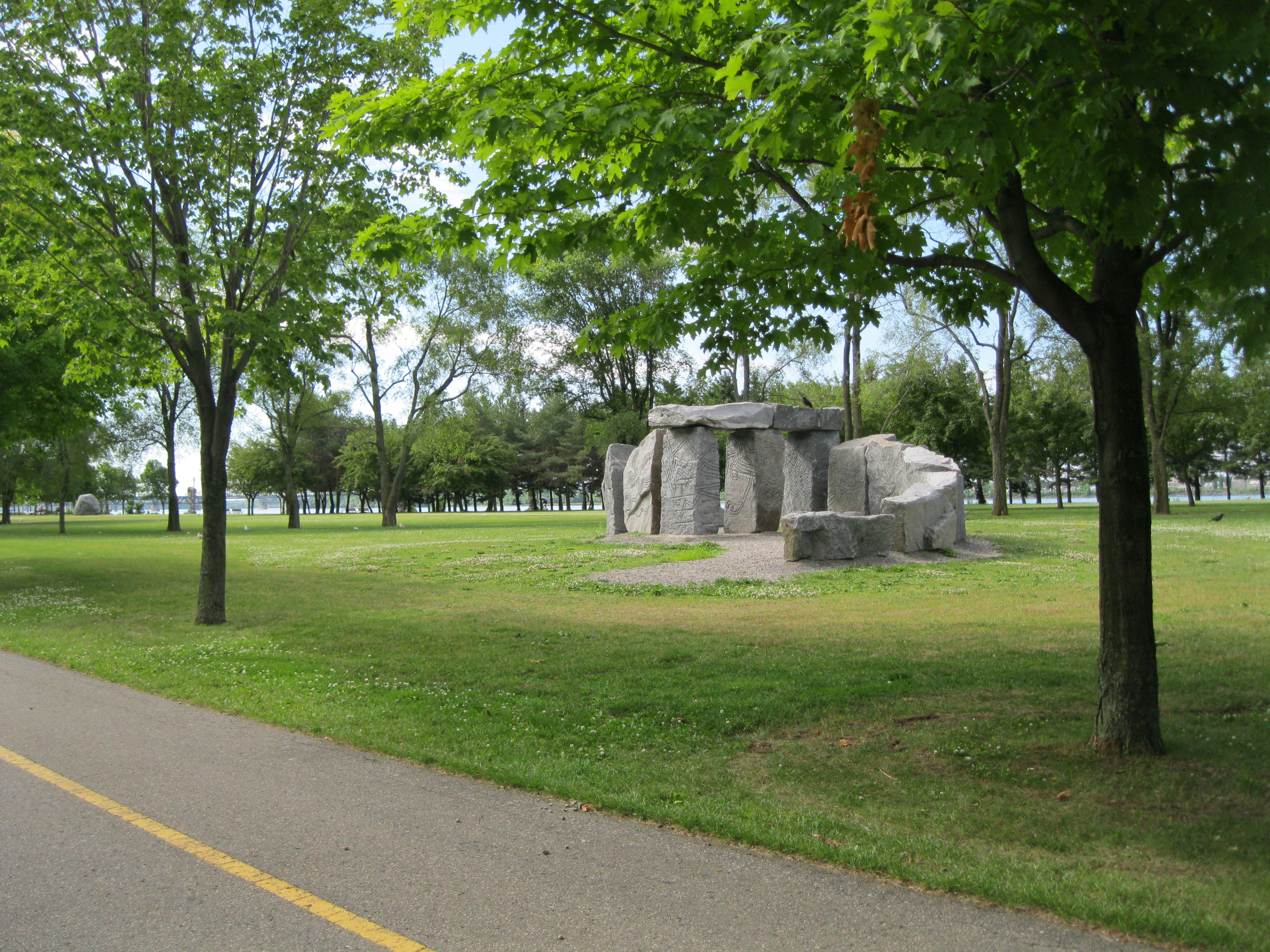
- Vortexit II sculpture in the park
- Interactive map of René-Lévesque Park
- Type: Urban park
- Location: Lachine, Montreal, Quebec, Canada
- Coordinates: 45°25′43″N 73°40′50″W
- Area: 14 hectares (35 acres)
- Operator: City of Montreal
- Open: 6:00 a.m. to 11:00 a.m.
- Status: Open all year
- Public transit: STM Bus: 110 Centrale, 495 Express LaSalle/Lachine
- Website: Parc René-Lévesque

René-Lévesque Park (French: Parc René-Lévesque) is an urban park in Montreal, Quebec, Canada. It is located in the borough of Lachine on a jetty between the Saint Lawrence River and the end of the Lachine Canal. Approximately 140,000 m^{2} (1,500,000 sq ft) in area, it is named after René Lévesque, the premier of Quebec from 1976 to 1985.

The park features a bicycle path, an arboretum and several species of birds. Road access to the park is mainly through the Chemin du Canal, an extension of Saint Patrick Street.

== History ==
The jetty was created in 1883 during a late expansion of the Lachine Canal. A parallel jetty, created in 1848 during the canal's first major expansion, is used as a yacht club.

== Sculpture garden ==
There is a sculpture garden consisting of twenty two sculptures by Quebec artists in the park. The sculptures were unveiled during three sculpture symposiums, the first having taken place in 1985. The sculpture garden is part of the Lachine Museum.

Among the sculptures are:

=== C ===
- Les cariatides (1988), by Takera Narita
- Cheval à plume (1988), by Miroslav Frederik Maler
- China Wall (1986), by Jean-Marie Delavalle

=== D ===
- Le déjeuner sur l'herbe (1997), by Dominique Rolland
- Détour : le grand jardin (1994), by Michel Goulet

=== E ===
- Écluses (1994), by Octavian Olariu
- Explorer (1994), by Mark Prent

=== F ===
- From A (1986), by Dominque Valade

=== H ===
- Hermès (1988), by Graham Cantieni
- Hommage à René Lévesque (1988), by Robert Roussil

=== P ===
- The Passing Song (1992), by Catherine Widgery
- Le phare d'Archimède (1986), by Dominque Rolland
- La pierre et le feu (1985), by Jean-Pierre Morin

=== S ===
- Signal pour Takis (1986), by Pierre Leblanc
- Site/Interlude (1994), by David Moore
- Souvenir de 1955 ou 2026 Roberval (1992), by Pierre Leblanc
- Story Rock (1986), by Bill Vazan

=== V ===
- La ville blanche (1986), by André Fournelle
- Vire au vent (1988), by Gilles Boisvert
- Vortexit II (2009), by Bill Vazan
- Les voûtes d'Ulysse (1992), by Guy Nadeau
