= Hannah Franklin =

Canadian sculptor and painter

- Born: 1937 (age 88–89) near Lublin, Poland
- Known for: Sculpture & painting

Hannah Franklin (née Faier; born 1937) is a Canadian sculptor and painter. Her work is found in numerous public and private collections including the Montreal Museum of Fine Arts, Musée national des beaux-arts du Québec, Musée d'art contemporain de Montréal, the Canada Council Art Bank, and the Canadian Broadcasting Corporation. She has exhibited in Europe and across North America.

== Early life ==
Her family fled to Uzbekistan in 1939 before returning in 1945. Emigrating to Canada in 1948, her family eventually settled in Montreal, Quebec. In 1964, she attended the Montreal Museum of Fine Art's School of Art and Design where she studied painting under Group of Seven artist Arthur Lismer and sculpture under Hugh LeRoy. Graduating in 1967, she was among the first in Canada to work in the new medium of plastics.

== Career ==
Best known as a sculptor, Franklin's first solo exhibits took place at Studio 23 (Montreal) and Toronto University in 1970. These were followed by group exhibits at the Ottawa Arts Centre in 1970, and the Montreal Museum of Fine Arts in 1972. In 1971, she was one of six Canadians invited to exhibit at the First International Small Sculpture Biennial, Budapest (Hungary). Other international exhibits included the 1974 International Art Fair, Basel, (Switzerland) and 1979 La Biennale de Québec (Montreal).

Selected from across Canada to participate in Expo 86 (Vancouver), Franklin created onsite "City Shapes" for Simon Fraser University. Her interest in dance and performance art led to stage and set conceptions for the Saidye Bronfman Centre (Montreal) in 1969–70, for the Company Hugo Romero (Mexico City) in 1978, and for the Montreal Classical Ballet at Place des Arts (Montreal) in 1989.

Also an abstract figurative painter, Franklin was a frequent solo exhibitor at Galerie Gilles Corbeil (Montreal) by 1974. Painting in a predominately yellow, blue and gold palette, her style is distinctively fluid and lyrical. The dancer is a reoccurring subject for her painting, bas-reliefs and bronze sculptors. The themes of genesis and generations is also ever present in her work. Writer Heather Solomon commented: "Franklin communicates the fleeting nature of life, as well as the imprint we make upon the Earth."

Franklin's work was featured in several solo exhibits at Montreal public galleries. The 1999 exhibit at the McClure Gallery of the Visual Arts Centre, "Beginnings", included paintings of tumbling children, bronze figures and freeform acrylic sculptures. The 2004 exhibit "Trains", at the City of Westmount's Gallery at Victoria Hall, chronicled her experience as a Uzbekistan war child returning to Poland. In November 2012, a retrospective exhibit of four decades of painting and sculpture was also held at the Gallery at Victoria Hall.

Recognized for her contribution to contemporary art, Franklin has been included in Marquis Who's Who in American Art since 1981. She has also been featured in the books Ecrits et témoignages de 21 sculpteurs, La Sculpture et le vent, 2004, in the 1989 Summer edition of the magazine Espace and in the exhibit catalogue Première biennale internationale de la petite sculpture. A former member of Stanley Lewis (sculptor)' Conseil de la Sculpture du Québec,

Her work is found in the collections of Montreal Museum of Fine Arts, Musée d'art contemporain de Montréal, the Canada Council Art Bank, and Simon Fraser University.

Franklin lives and works in Montreal, Quebec, Canada.
