= Gilles Boisvert =

Gilles Boisvert may refer to:

- Gilles Boisvert (ice hockey) (1933–2022), Canadian ice hockey player
- Gilles Boisvert (artist) (born 1940), Canadian artist and sculptor
