= La Fontaine Park =

Urban park in Montreal, Canada

- Parc La Fontaine
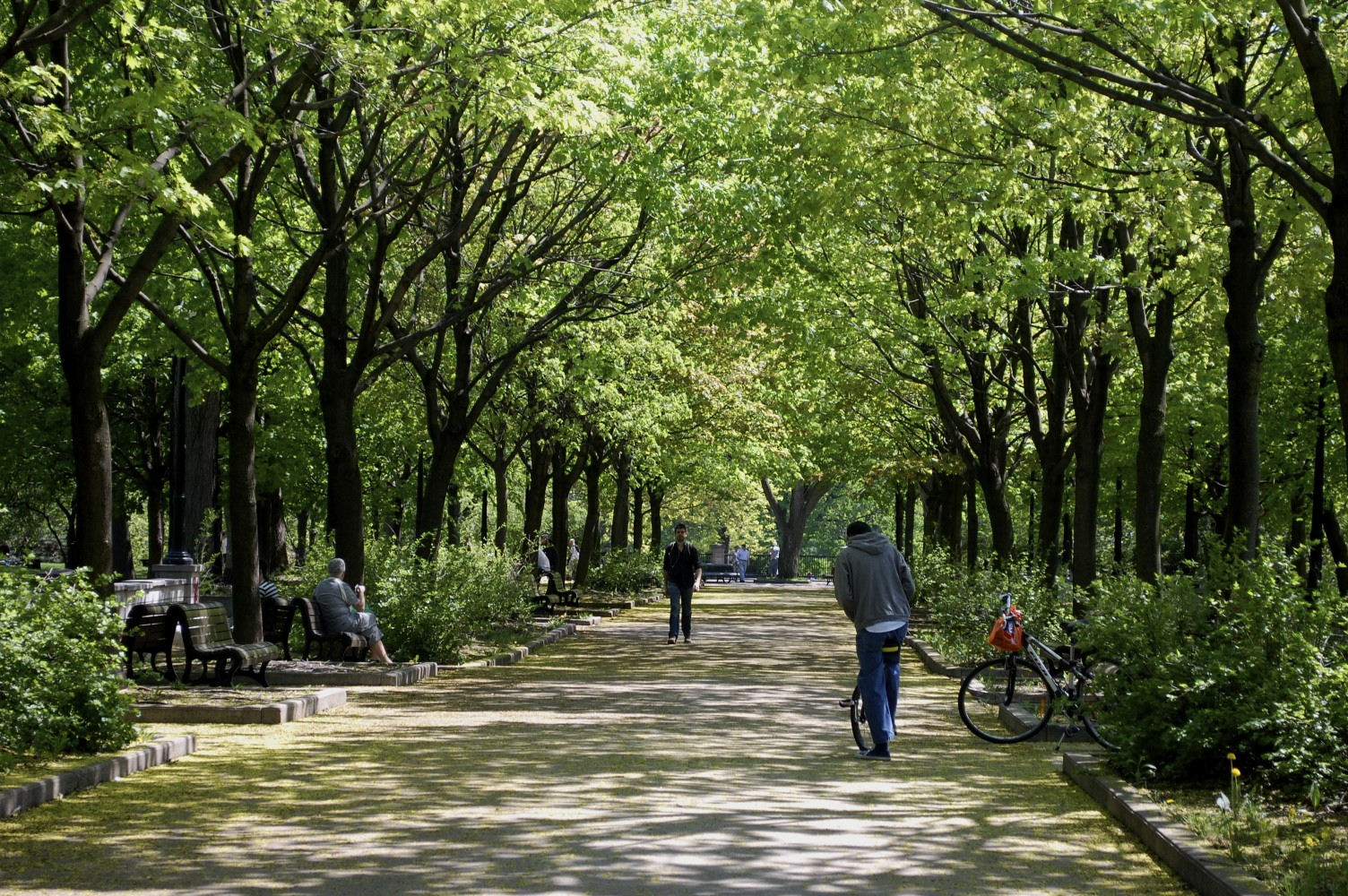
- A path in the park
- Interactive map of La Fontaine Park
- Type: Urban park
- Location: Le Plateau-Mont-Royal, Montreal, Quebec, Canada
- Coordinates: 45°31′36″N 73°34′08″W
- Area: 34 hectares (84 acres)
- Operator: City of Montreal
- Open: 6:00 a.m. to 12:00 a.m.
- Status: Open all year
- Public transit: STM Bus:14, 24, 29, 45, 359 and 445 at Sherbrooke station
- Website: Parc La Fontaine

La Fontaine Park (French: Parc La Fontaine) is a 34 ha (84 acres) urban park located in the borough of Le Plateau-Mont-Royal in Montreal, Quebec, Canada. Named in honour of Louis-Hippolyte Lafontaine, The park's features include two linked ponds with a fountain and waterfalls, the Théâtre de Verdure open-air venue, the Calixa-Lavallée cultural centre, a monument to Adam Dollard des Ormeaux, playing fields and tennis courts. Its ponds are a popular attraction during Montreal's hot summers, with outdoor ice skating in winter. Bike paths run along the park's western and northern edges. Parc La Fontaine is surrounded by Sherbrooke Street on the South, Parc-La Fontaine Avenue on the West, Rachel Street on the North, and Papineau avenue on the East.

== History ==
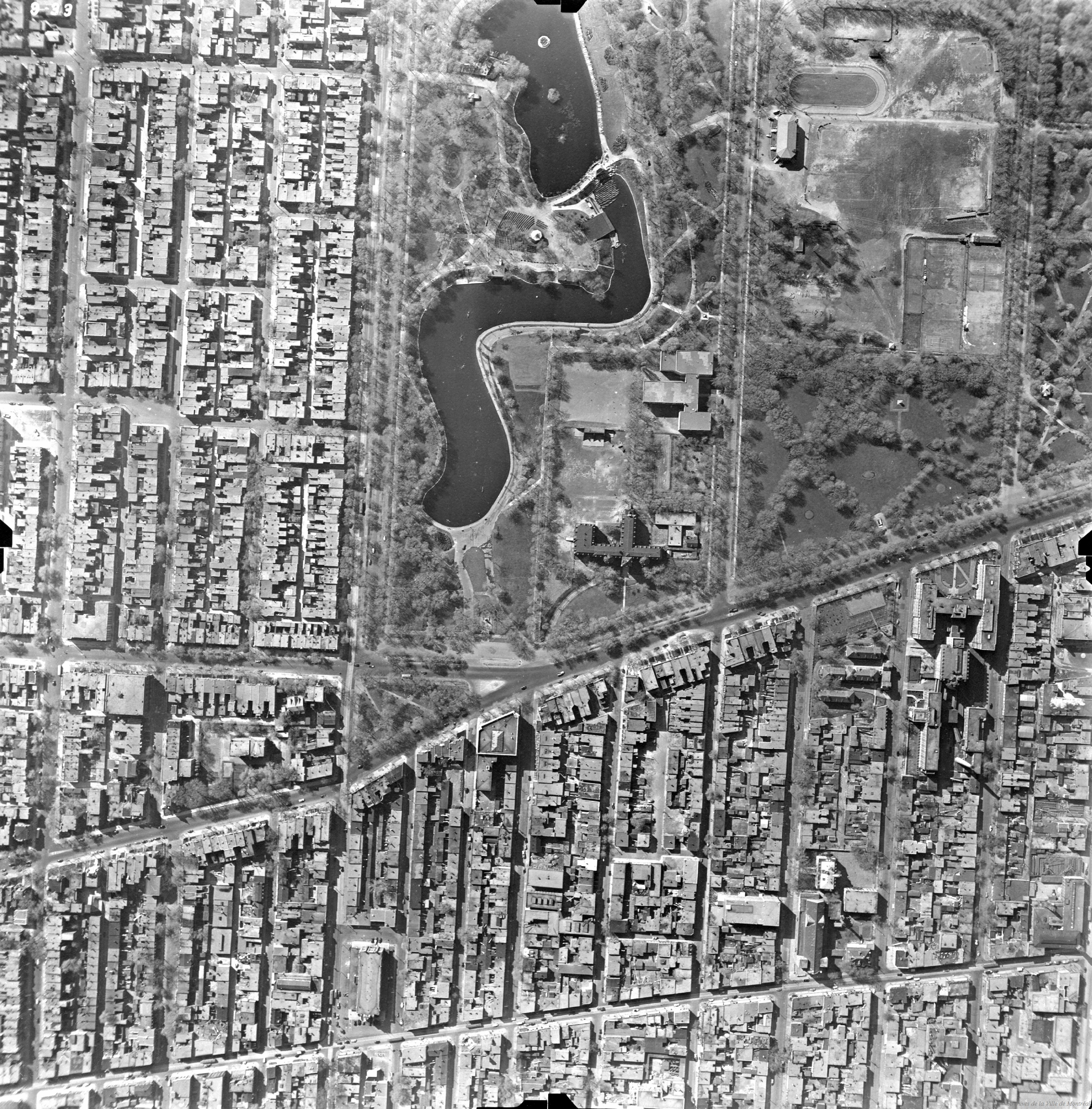
An aerial view of La Fontaine Park in 1947.

La Fontaine Park (formerly Logan Park) is located on the grounds of the old Logan farm. This land was sold in 1845 to the Government of Canada, which then used it for military practice until 1888. The soldiers of the British garrison housed there and were trained in the surrounding wilderness.

The City of Montreal rented part of the Logan farm to create a park that was inaugurated in 1874 under the name "Logan Park". In 1888, the park underwent its first major landscaping work. It was part of the first phase of the development of the city's large nature parks, which also included Mount Royal and St. Helen's Island. Two years later, the greenhouses from Viger Square were moved to the park. This is where all the flowers that adorn the city were grown, until 1952.

In 1900, the city dug two basins at different levels, in the center of the park. They were separated by a waterfall over which the French landscape architect Clovis Degrelle built a bridge.

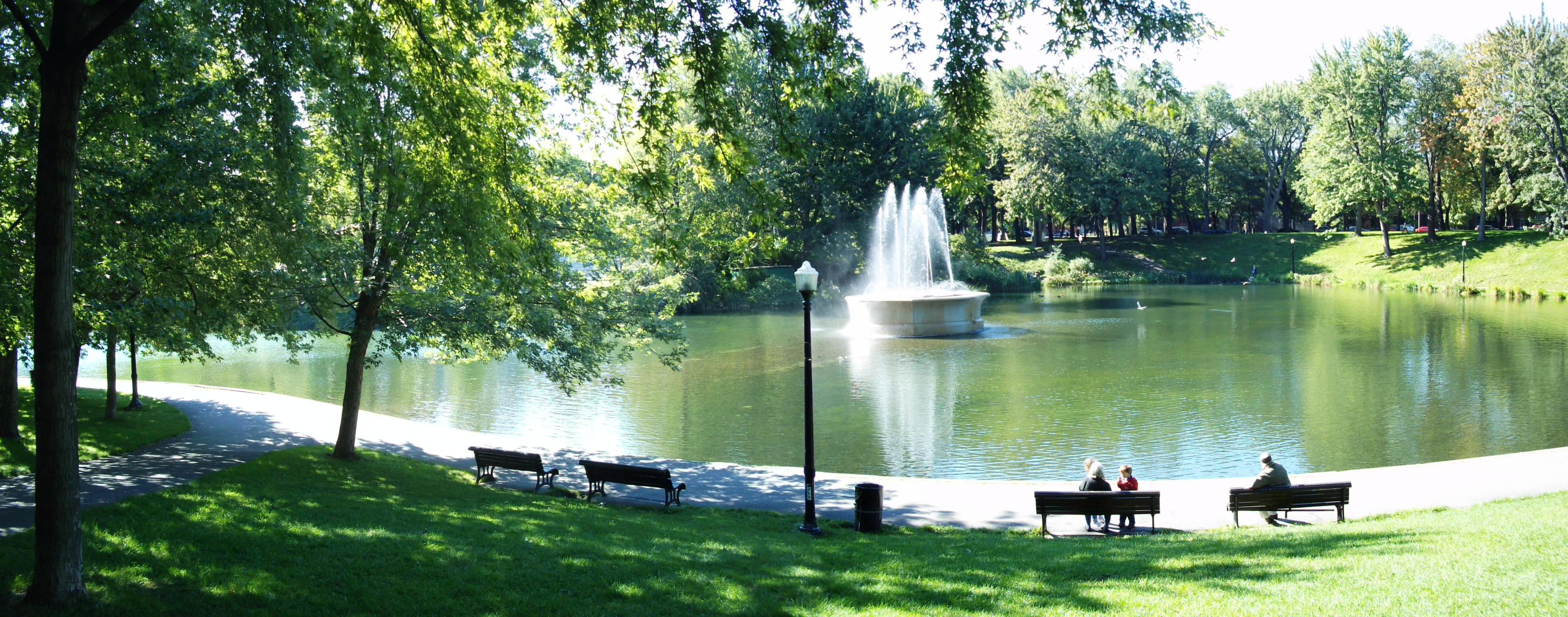
La Fontaine Park fountain

Occupying increasing importance to the Francophone population, Logan Park was renamed La Fontaine Park, in 1901, at the time of the Saint-Jean-Baptiste Day parade. The park was named not for its famous fountain, but instead to honor the memory of Louis-Hippolyte Lafontaine, the first francophone prime minister of the Province of Canada.

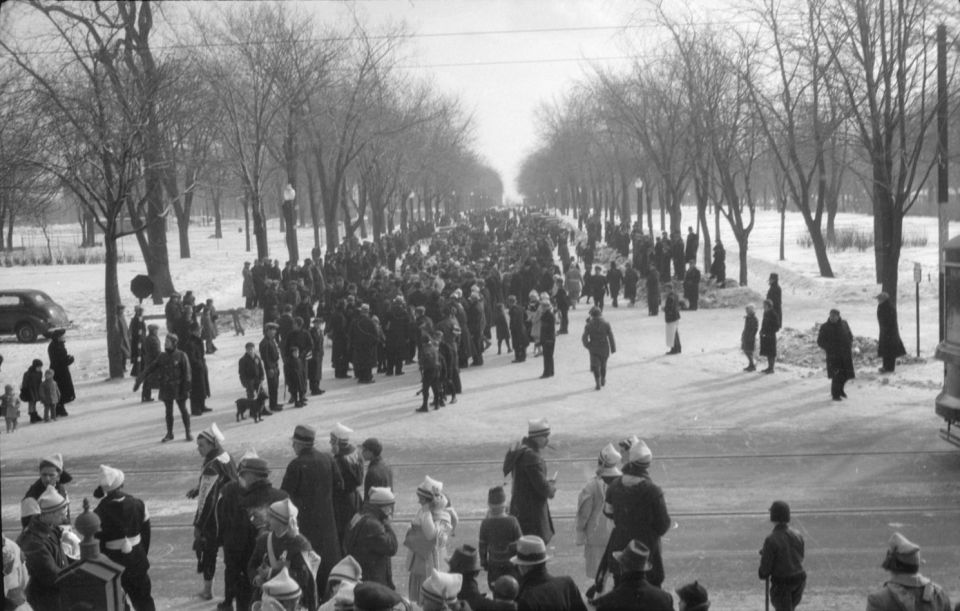
Crowds at Lafontaine Park, 1938

Three years later, the city expropriated homes on the city block and in the park. In 1909, the federal government donated almost all of the western section.

The illuminated fountain, which was designed by Léon Trépanier and commissioned by the Westinghouse Electric Company, was erected in the north basin in 1929. At the same time, the monument in honor of Louis-Hippolyte Lafontaine was installed.

A few years later, under the direction of Claude Robillard, the director of the Municipal Parks Service, La Fontaine Park was completely redesigned. This also marked the beginning of the construction of the chalet restaurant according to the plans by architect Donat Beaupré (the previous chalet had been destroyed by fire in 1944). The new building is part of an overall plan which includes a central pavilion, a conch for symphony concerts, an amphitheater with a capacity of 4,000 seats, a new bridge and a modification of the two ponds. The greenhouses, caretaker's house, the waterfall and the Grenelle-built bridge were demolished. In 1953 the chalet restaurant was opened by the Mayor of Montreal, Camillien Houde.

Théâtre de Verdure

On July 8, 1956, the Théâtre de Verdure was inaugurated. It was also built by Claude Robillard, and was intended to host outdoor theatrical performances inspired by ancient amphitheatres. In 1965, under the direction of Germaine Dugas, the theatre produced many singers, including among others, Clémence DesRochers, Raymond Lévesque, Pauline Julien and Yvon Deschamps. For over 50 years, the outdoor theatre offered free cultural programming in a natural setting until its temporary closure in 2014 due to decaying facilities. On June 30, 2022, the Theatre de Verdure reopened with a new modernized design and equipment adapted to outdoors by the architectural firm Lemay. The amphitheatre now seats upwards of 2,500 spectators.

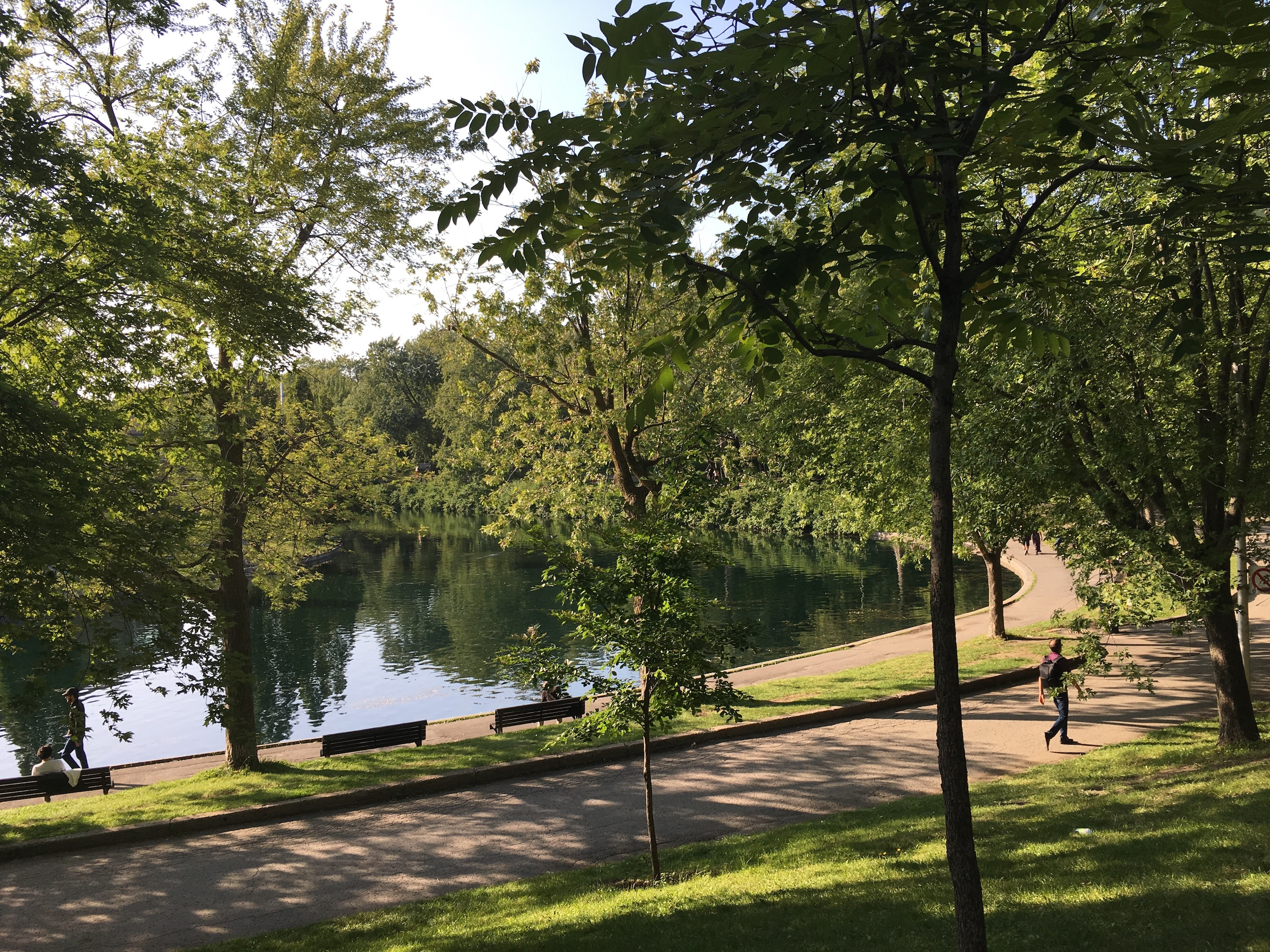
La Fontaine Park in the summer

For many years the park also hosted the "Garden of Wonders" (French: Jardin des merveilles), a small urban zoo built by the city, which opened on July 5, 1957. The garden closed in 1989. Its buildings were inspired by fables and tales, it had farm animals and other more exotic animals, including its sea lions.

Beautification works were initiated in the park in 1990: a new pathway leads visitors to a lookout above the upper pool, while a second lookout, where the works of Michel Goulet can be observed, dominates the lower pond in the axis of Roy Street. The statues of Charles de Gaulle and Félix Leclerc were installed. In 1992, the park came under full legal ownership of the City of Montreal. The park is occupied by many buildings such as the École supérieure du Plateau and Calixa Lavallée pavilion. Over the years, many monuments were added, such as the one dedicated to Adam Dollard des Ormeaux (1920). Today, La Fontaine Park continues to host the Théâtre de Verdure and the Espace La Fontaine cultural café.

On December 20, 2020, a protest against the sanitary measures imposed on the population in response of COVID-19 pandemic in Quebec gathered thousands of Canadiens at La Fontaine Park. A total of 280 people were fined including Lethwei World Champion fighter Dave Leduc who was detained after his speech and fined 1546 CAD$ by the SPVM police force for not wearing a facial covering outside.

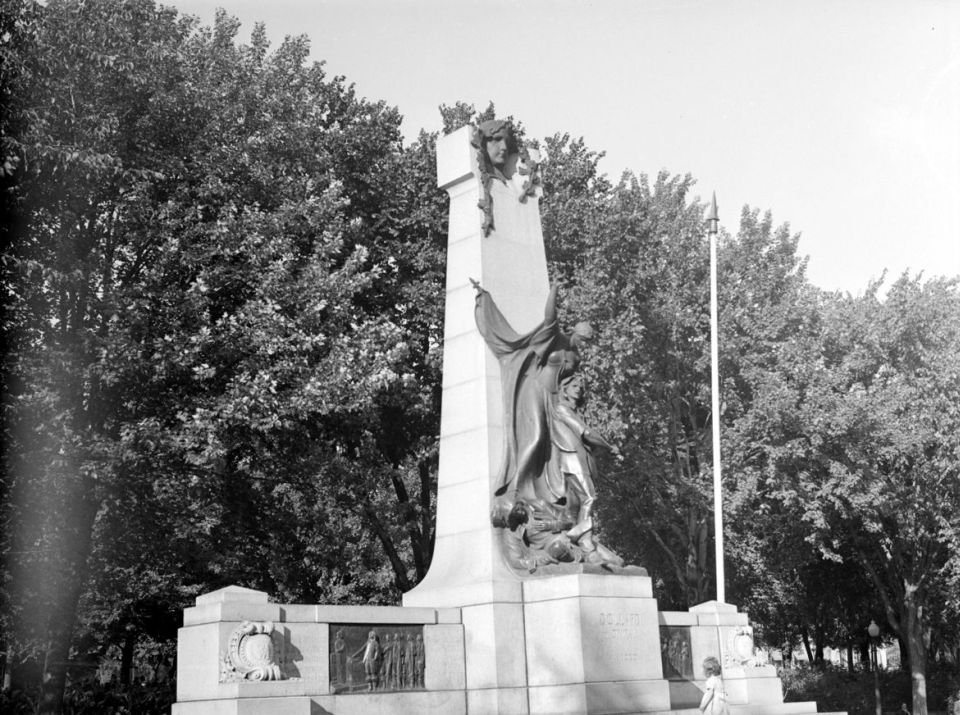
Monument to Dollard des Ormeaux in 1943

== Art ==
=== Debout ===
This statue in honour of Quebec writer Félix Leclerc was inaugurated in 1990. The bronze sculpture borders a square encircled by 30 bronze plaques, each inscribed with a word of a quotation from one of Félix Leclerc's poems.

=== Les leçons singulières (volet 2) ===
This sculpture is the second part of the sculpture Les leçons singulières created by Michel Goulet. (The first part is in Place Roy.) It was inaugurated in 1991. It is composed of six unmatched chairs and a table-sculpture reproducing the relief features of Parc La Fontaine.

=== Monument à Dollard des Ormeaux ===
This bronze sculpture in honour of Adam Dollard des Ormeaux was created by sculptor Alfred Laliberté and the architect Alphonse Venne. It was inaugurated on June 24, 1920. Adam Dollard des Ormeaux personified the nationalist sentiment and the desire to write the history of Québec that ruled at the time.

=== Monument à Sir Louis-Hippolyte La Fontaine ===
This bronze sculpture in honour of the former premier of the United Province of Canada, Louis-Hippolyte Lafontaine was created by sculptor Henri Hébert. It was inaugurated in the summer of 1930. This likeness has him wearing the robe of a justice of the Court of Queen's Bench, the court that he created and the position he occupied for the last 10 years of his life.

=== Obélisque en Hommage à Charles de Gaulle ===
This sculpture in honour of French President and General Charles de Gaulle was created by Olivier Debré and inaugurated in 1990.
