= LeBer-LeMoyne House =

Oldest building in Montreal

Coordinates: 45°25′48″N 73°39′59″W

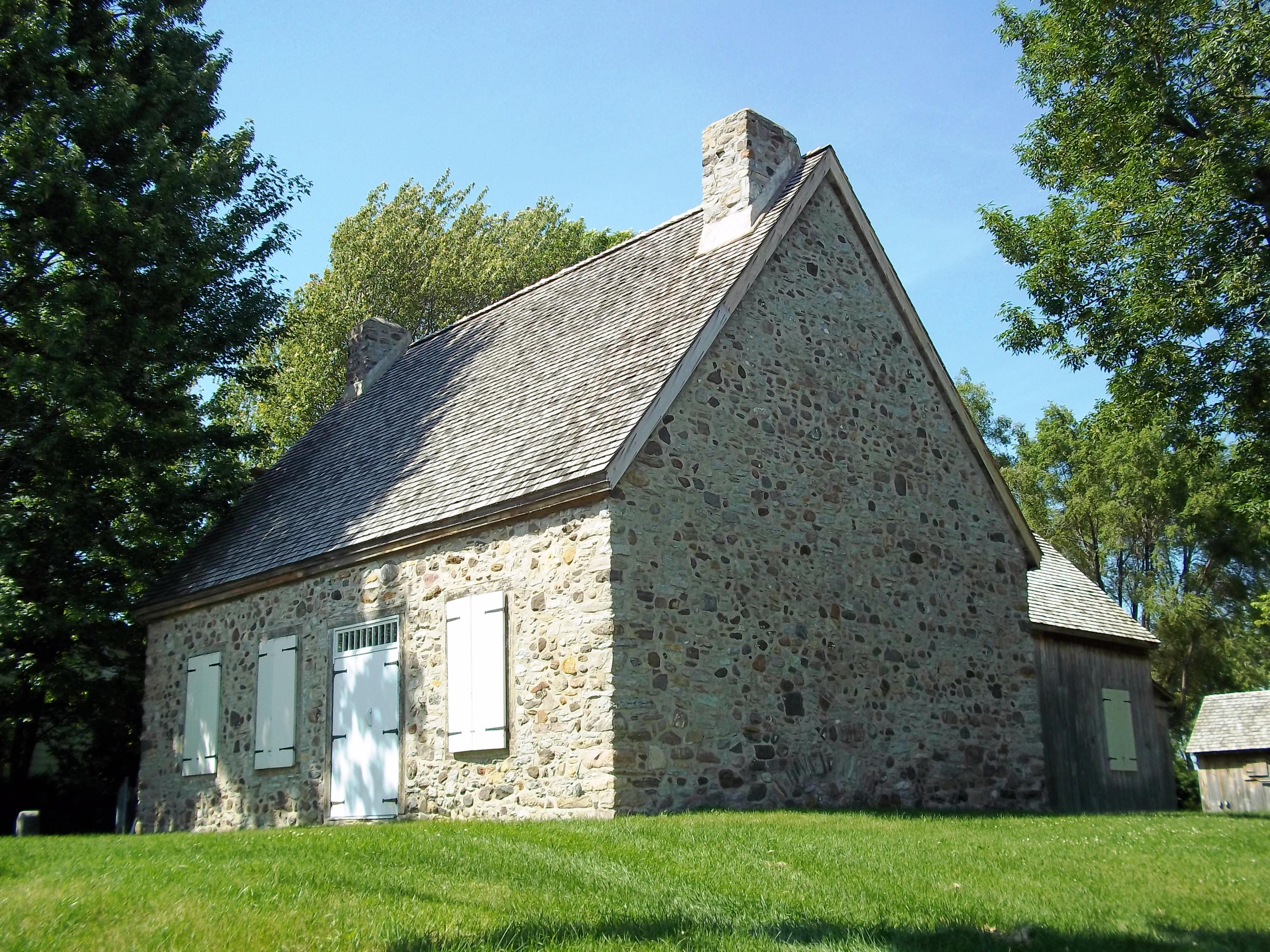
Le Ber-Le Moyne House

Le Ber-Le Moyne House (French: Maison Le Ber-Le Moyne) is the oldest complete building in Montreal, Quebec, Canada, built between 1669 and 1671. It is located in the borough of Lachine, bordering the Saint Lawrence River, between the Lachine Rapids and Lake Saint-Louis. It is a recognized National Historic Site of Canada since June 19, 2002. The Le Ber-Le Moyne site and its archaeological collection have also been classified as heritage assets by the ministère de la Culture et des communications du Québec since 2001.

== The fur trading post (1669–1687) ==
The Le Ber-Le Moyne House was constructed on land which once belonged to the French explorer René-Robert Cavelier de La Salle. In 1667, Ville Marie's richest merchants, Jacques Le Ber and Charles Le Moyne bought the land from Cavelier de La Salle to construct Lachine's first fur trading post. Constructed between 1669 and 1671, the fur trading post enabled the two brothers-in-law to control the main access routes of the Lake Saint-Louis and consequently the fur trade. Archival records indicate that the merchants ceased to use the building sometime between 1680 and 1685. Today, the Le Ber-Le Moyne House is the last remaining structure that can be associated with Charles Le Moyne's career.

== From trading post to farm house (1687–1844) ==
Following Le Moyne's death in 1685, his widow, Catherine Primot, sold the former fur trading post to Guillemot dit Lalande in 1687. The dit Lalande family did not remain in Lachine for very long. In 1689 the family abandoned their home following the Massacre of Lachine.

In 1695, Marguerite Chorel, the wife of Guillaume de Lorimier, acquired the house and the surrounding land. The couple moved into their new home in 1698; widowed in 1709, Chorel lived off the land with her children and continued to reside in the Le Ber-Le Moyne House until her death in 1736. Her daughter and son inherited the house and its surrounding farmland.

Hugh Heney, an Irish inn owner, acquired the farm in 1765. Three years later, Heney hired Jean-Baptiste Crête to modernize the home. Heney never moved into the house himself but rather leased it and had his tenants cultivate the farmland.

== From farm house to manor (1844–1946) ==
With the widening of the Lachine Canal in the 1840s, the site's agricultural land was greatly diminished. The retired colonel Edward P. Wilgress acquired the property in 1844. Certain artworks, including Frances A. Hopkin's "Wilgress House and Garden, Lachine" (1858-1860) and J.E. Taylor's "The Cottage. Lachine" (1869) allow us to witness the house's numerous transformations over the course of the century.

Sold in 1901 to the merchant William Curie, the Le Ber-Le Moyne House became the Curie family's summer residence.

== From manor to museum (1946–present) ==
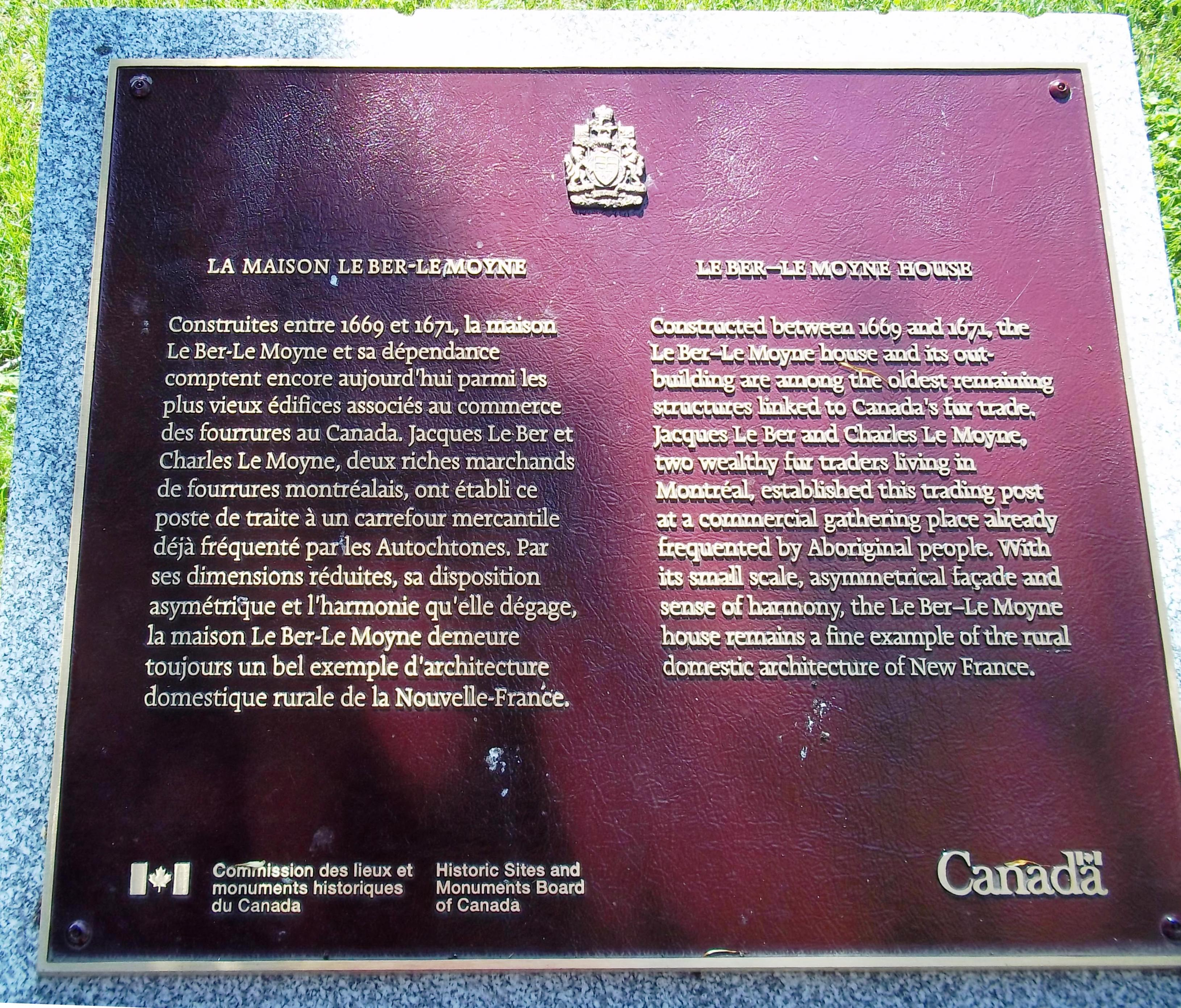
Commemorative plaque.

In the 1940s the mayor of Lachine, Anatole Carignan, recognized the Le Ber-Le Moyne House's historical value and believed the municipality should acquire it for the benefit of the community. When the house came up for sale in 1946, the City of Lachine purchased it for $25,000. Carignan decided to turn the old house into a history museum. The Manoir Lachine officially opened its doors to the public on June 24, 1948.

In the early 1950s, a fish hatchery with rearing ponds and aquariums was installed on the site of the museum. The hatchery was established by Quebec's ministère de la Chasse et de la pêche and the Office de biologie. Although the fish hatchery brought the museum widespread public attention, it closed in 1962.

The museum underwent significant changes in the early 1980s. Most importantly, the Le Ber-Le Moyne House and its Dependency were stripped of the massive architectural additions from the 1950s and of earlier elements such as the porch and the dormers. The building was stripped of these and its many other additions to reveal the original stone walls and beams. The goal of this massive restoration project was to salvage the original architecture and restore its 17th-century appearance.

Between 1998-2000 and 2009-2010, the firm Archéotec conducted archaeological digs in and around the Le Ber-Le Moyne House. Roughly 32,000 fragments and objects were uncovered during these digs. The artifacts and ecofacts document the various phases of the site's occupation. For instance, pottery shards, beads and tools dating back between 2,000 and 2,500 years ago confirm the presence of Native Americans on the Le Ber-Le Moyne site. Furthermore, many suspected the trading post constructed by Le Ber and Le Moyne had been razed by fire during the Massacre in 1689 and reconstructed by Chorel and her husband between 1695 and 1698. The archaeological digs conducted by Archéotec have refuted this theory. Archaeologists have been unable to find traces of the supposed fire nor have they found anything that would indicate Chorel repaired or rebuilt the house. Archéotec suggests the large quantity of artifacts commonly used as trading goods during the French Regime confirm the house was in fact built by Le Moyne and Le Ber.

Today the Le Ber-Le Moyne House is part of the Musée de Lachine complex. The Musée de Lachine comprises the Le Ber-Le Moyne heritage site, a designated archaeological collection, historical buildings constructed in the 17th century, and a sculpture garden known as the Musée plein air de Lachine. The sculpture garden is one of the largest in Canada and includes works by numerous artists including Bill Vazan, Ulysse Comtois, Marcel Barbeau, Michel Goulet and Linda Covit. In addition to the historical and archaeological objects on display in its permanent exhibition, each year the Musée de Lachine presents a contemporary art exhibition developed around works from its collection.

The museum is located 6 kilometers (3.73 miles) from Angrignon Metro station, and can be reached using the 110 and 195 buses operated by the Société de transport de Montréal in around 40 minutes.

== Architecture ==
LeBer-LeMoyne House is considered an example of French Colonial architecture. The cedar shingles on the roof and lack of dormers are considered to be some of this style's characteristics.
