= Viger Square =

Urban square in Montreal, Quebec, Canada

Viger Square French: Square Viger
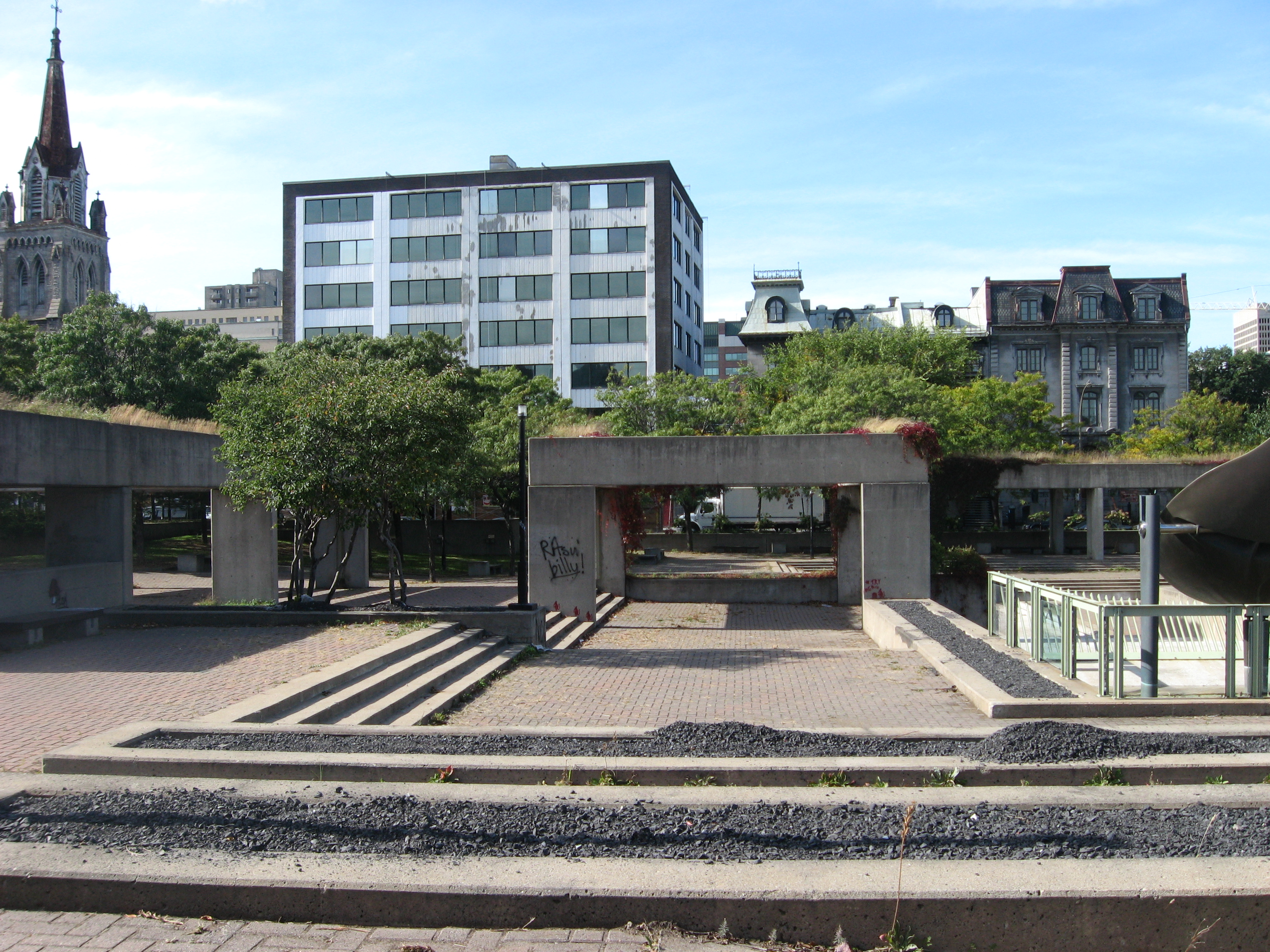
- Agora by Charles Daudelin is a prominent sculpture in Viger Square.

- Location within Montreal
- Type: Town square
- Location: Old Montreal, Ville-Marie Montreal, Quebec, Canada
- Coordinates: 45°30′45″N 73°33′14″W
- Created: September 11, 1860
- Operator: City of Montreal
- Status: Open all year

Viger Square (officially in French: square Viger) is an urban square in Montreal, Quebec, Canada. It was greatly changed by the construction of the Ville-Marie Expressway in the 1970s. The square is divided into three sections. It is bordered to the west by Saint Denis Street, to the east by Saint André Street, to the north by Viger Street, and to the south by Saint Antoine Street.

== History ==
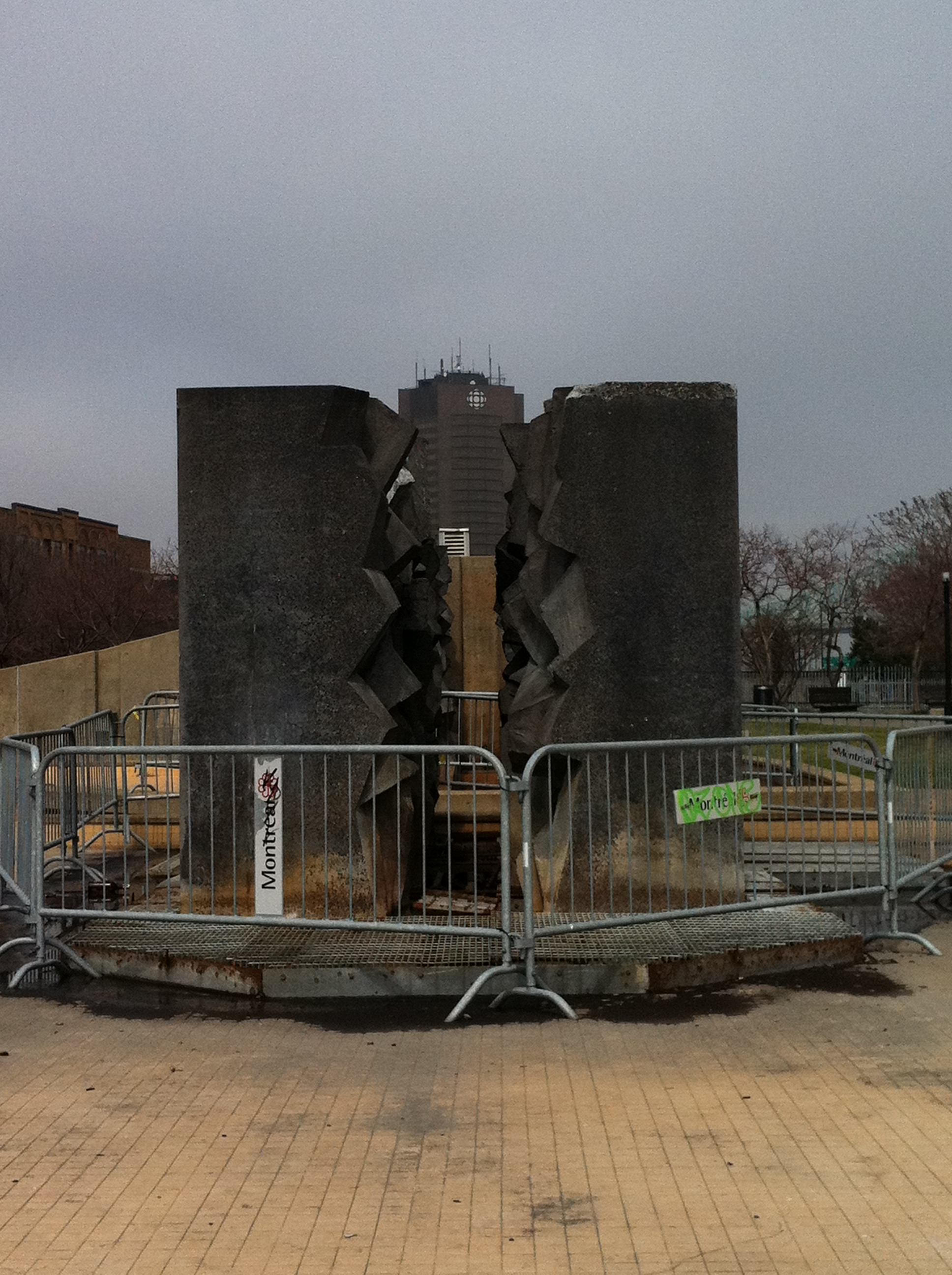
Force sculpture fountain by Claude Théberge.

In the 1840s, the city of Montreal acquired several parcels of marshland permitting for its development. Trees were planted and pathways were traced.

Prior to 1851, a hay market and public scale operated on the site on the east side of Saint Denis Street. The hay market moved a few times on the site, but was always to the east.

Viger Square was inaugurated on September 11, 1860. In 1865, greenhouses were added, although were moved to La Fontaine Park in 1889.

In 1870, Viger Square was the only public place in Montreal to hear live music. Ernest Lavigne directed his orchestra in Viger Square from 1885 to 1889, before he moved to Sohmer Park.

In 1892, to enlarge the square at the request of citizens, the cattle market was demolished near Saint André St. Some members of the French-Canadian elite moved near the square, which experienced a boom with the construction of prestigious buildings such as Place Viger (700 Saint Antoine Street) by architect Bruce Price in 1898 and the École des hautes études commerciales (535 Viger Avenue) in 1908-1910.

In the mid-20th century, several redevelopment projects were suggested for this vast space. Among them were plans to build a municipal library, an auditorium (to celebrate the 300th anniversary of Montreal in 1942) or to accommodate a large parking lot (in the 1950s).

It was the development of road infrastructure that ended up taking over the space. The park was destroyed when the underground Ville-Marie Expressway was built in the 1970s. Once the highway was finished, a new Viger Square was created on its concrete roof in three parts, delimited by Saint-Denis, Berri, Saint-Hubert and Saint-André Streets. The development of the three sections was entrusted to sculptors Charles Daudelin, Claude Théberge and Peter Gnass and was completed in 1985.

The artist-run centre Dare-Dare was based in Viger Square from August 2004 to July 2006 and presented more than a dozen exhibitions, events and performances.

The main social and entertainment location for non-sporting events during the inaugural 2006 World Outgames was located at the west side of Viger Square.

== Future plans ==
As it stands now, Viger Square holds little resemblance to what it once was. It is criticized because of the strong presence of concrete structures and especially of homeless people. The Centre hospitalier de l'Université de Montréal project will bring many changes to the neighbourhood. Public consultations will take place that will lead a significant restructuring of Viger Square.

== Jean-Olivier Chénier Monument ==
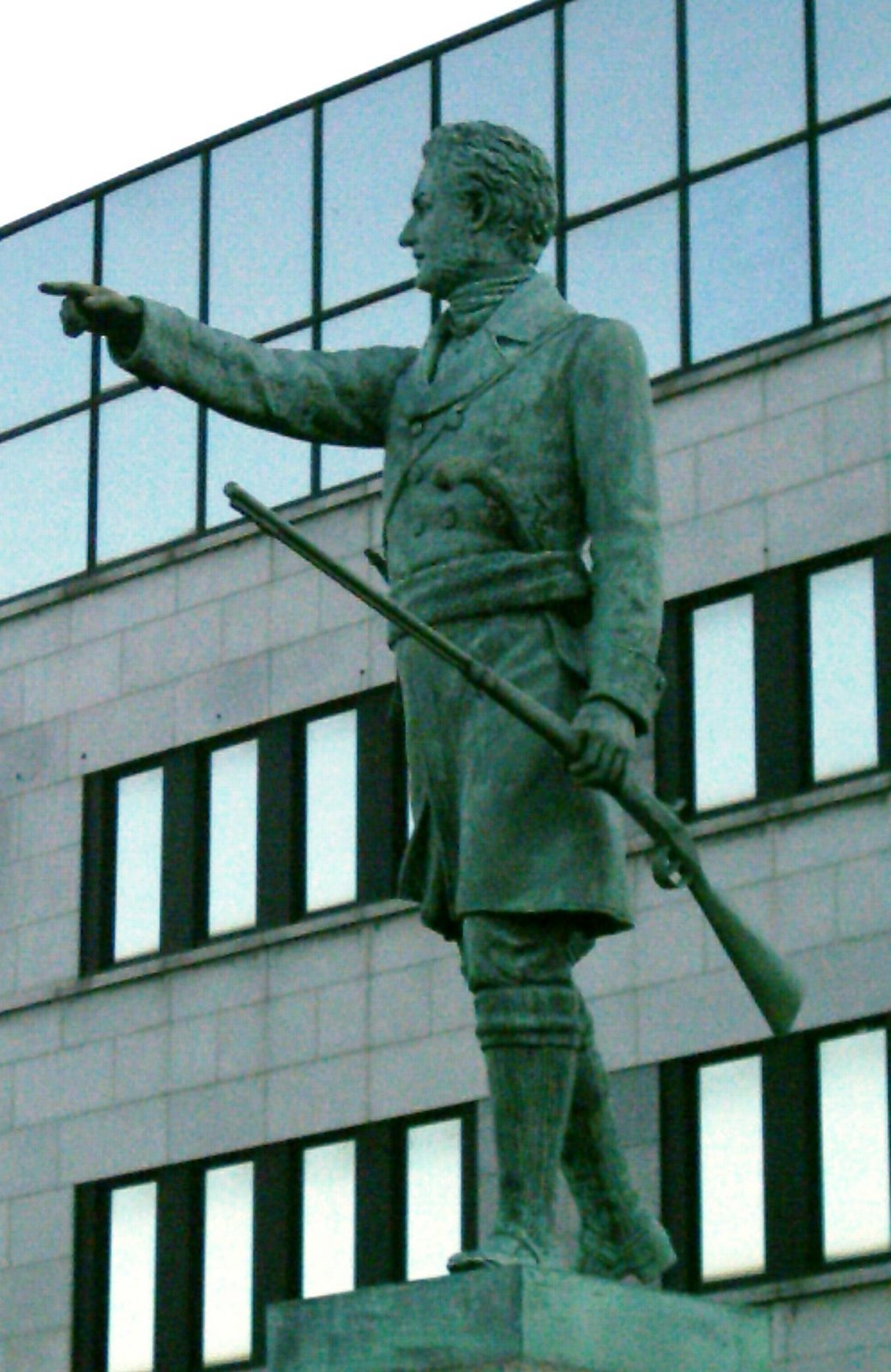
The Jean-Olivier Chénier Monument on Saint Denis Street, opposite Viger Square.

The Jean-Olivier Chénier Monument is a memorial designed by Alfonso Pelzer located on Saint Denis Street opposite Viger Square. A committee created in 1893 authorized the monument on April 24, 1895. It stands 4.33 metres (14.2 ft) tall and is made of pink granite, bronze and copper.

== Sculptures ==
- Agora (1983), by Charles Daudelin
- Mastodo (fountain sculpture) (1984) by Charles Daudelin
- Force (fountain sculpture) (1985), by Claude Théberge
- Jeux d'enfants (fountain sculpture) (1984), by Peter Gnass
