= Léon Trépanier =

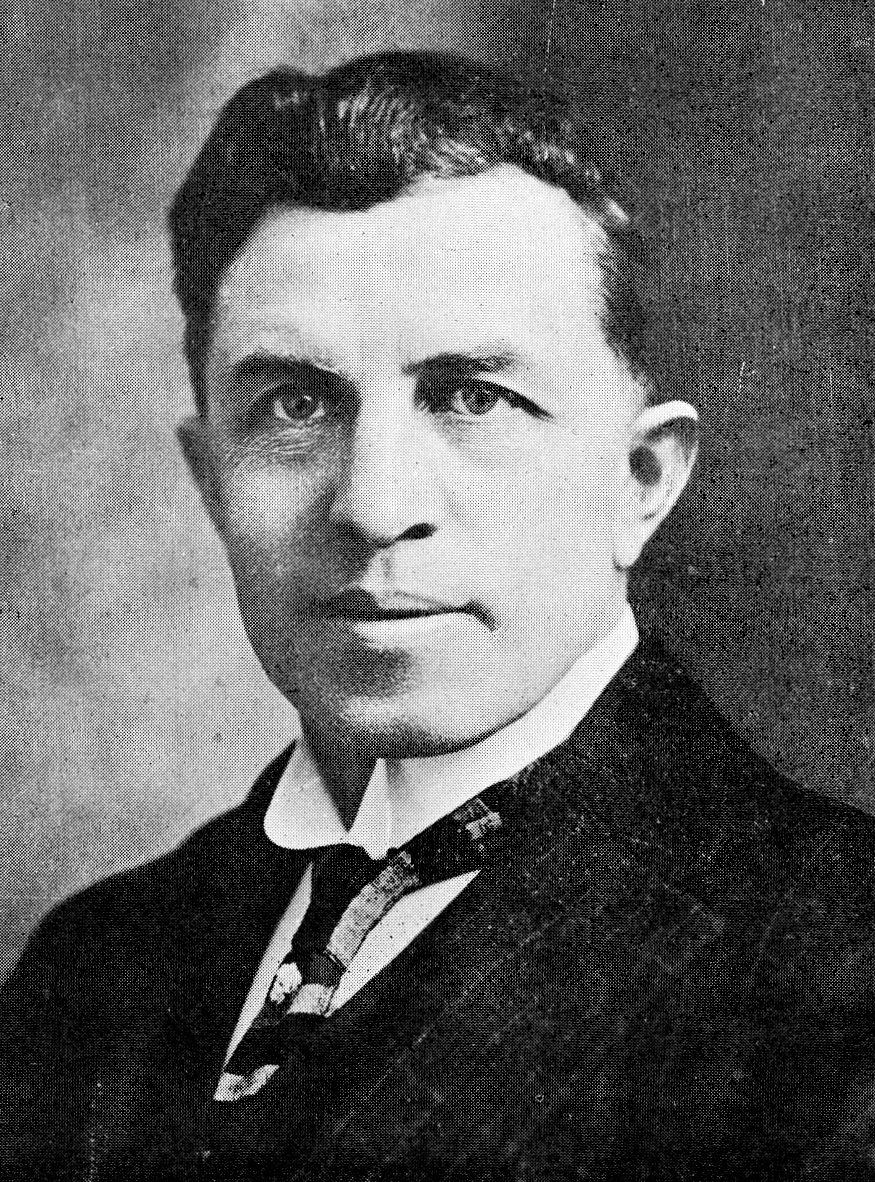
Léon Trépanier

Léon Trépanier OBE, (June 29, 1 – September 19, 1967) was a Quebec journalist, historian and politician. He was president of the Saint-Jean-Baptiste Society of Montreal from 1925 to 1929.

The son of François Trépanier and d'Élise Huard, he was born in Quebec City and was educated at the University of Ottawa. He began his career as a journalist in Montreal at La Presse in 1905 and later worked at La Patrie and Le Devoir. Trépanier represented Defontaine on Montreal city council from 1921 to 1938. As president of the Saint-Jean-Baptiste Society, he proposed the installation of the illuminated cross on Mount Royal and initiated the annual parades held on Saint-Jean-Baptiste Day in Montreal. He served as leader of the Montreal City Council from 1928 to 1930 and from 1932 to 1934. He led the preparations for the celebrations of the 300th anniversary of the founding of Montreal. While serving as alderman, he proposed the installation of the illuminated fountain in Montreal's La Fontaine Park.

In 1906, he married Anne-Marie Gagnon.

Later in life, he pursued a second career as a historian. He was a member of the Société des Dix and published biographies of several Montreal mayors.

Trépanier was a member of the Cercle universitaire de Montréal and the Commission des monuments et des sites historiques du Québec.

He died in 1967 at the age of 90.

== Selected bibliography ==
- Figures de maires : Sévère-Dominique Rivard (1956)
- Figures de Maires : Édouard-Raymond Fabre (1959)
- Nos hôtels de ville (1960)
- On veut savoir - 4 volumes 1960-1962
- L'affaire Walker à Montréal en 1764 (1962)
- Guillaume Lamothe (1824-1911) (1964)
- Les attributs de la mairie de Montréal (1966)
- Les rues du vieux Montréal au fil du temps (1968)

== Honours ==
- Order of the British Empire (1943)
- Gold medal of the Société historique de Montréal (1963)
- Avenue Léon-Trépanier in Montreal, Rue Léon-Trépanier in Trois-Rivières and Rue Léon-Trépanier in Sherbrooke were named in his honour
