= Germaine Dugas =

Canadian singer-songwriter and TV host

- Born: 1934 (age 91–92); Montreal, Quebec, Canada
- Occupations: Singer-songwriter, Television host
- Notable work: "Deux enfants du même âge"

Germaine Dugas (born 1934) is a Canadian singer-songwriter and television host. She was one of the first women to record her own songs in Quebec.

== Biography ==
Germaine Dugas was born in 1934 in Montreal, Quebec, Canada.

She won fourth prize in the 1958 Concours de la chanson canadienne for "Viens avec moi et tu verras", a military march that was performed by the Collégiens Troubadours. The song was very popular with students. Around that time, her song "Mes cousins" was successful. She was one of the first women to record her own songs in Quebec.

In 1959, "Deux enfants du même âge" won the Grand Prize of Canadian disc of CKAC– a first for a woman and for a singer-songwriter. It reached the top of the charts in Quebec, a rare feat for a singer-songwriter. Having become popular, she gave shows across Quebec and in Paris, at Chez Patachou.

In 1961, her first album Germaine Dugas won the originality prize at the Grand Prize of the Canadian disc of CKAC. From 1959 to 1963, she hosted the children's show Coucou with Raymond Lévesque. In 1962, she represented French Canadian music in a Belgian television show with Félix Leclerc.

In spring 1965, Dugas suggested that the Service des parcs create a boîte à chansons at the Théâtre de Verdure at the La Fontaine Park. The boîte à chansons Sous les étoiles was then created in the summer of the same year. Dugas performed in the boîte à chansons and was responsible for the boîte's musical programming.

Dugas stopped making discs after her second album, Germaine Dugas: oranges, citrons, limons, failed to achieve the expected success. She hosted the TV shows Cousin, Cousine in 1967 and Soleil et jour de pluie in 1969. She continued performing on stage until 1972.

She attempted a comeback on disc in 1983, but failed. She was a part of the Choeur des artistes in 1985, composed "Nous vivrons ensemble" for Danielle Oddera and Roberto Medile in 1989 and gave a few shows in the early 1990s. Les Éditions Trois published a songbook of her songs in 1991.

In 2010 "Deux enfants du même âge" was inducted in the Canadian Songwriters Hall of Fame.

== Discography ==
Singles
Year	Title
1958	Mes cousins/Laissez-moi rêver
1958	Moi j’ai ça/Un beau gars
1960	Deux enfants du même âge/Le paradis
1960	La marche de tous les gars/J’aurais voulu
1960	Comme une route/A la vie
1961	Forts de nos vingt ans/Il était une fois
1962?	L’homme et l’enfant/Le tango de l’éléphant
1963	Tante Rose-Aimée/Depuis l’temps, depuis l’temps
1963	Les gens de ton espèce/Faudrait pourtant
1964	Ne vous mariez pas, les filles/Le monsieur et le jeune homme
1983	Deux enfants du même âge/J’imagine un peu
1984	S’il pleut aujourd’hui/C’est vrai

Albums
Year	Title
1961	Germaine Dugas
1963	Germaine Dugas: oranges, citrons, limons
