= Hugh LeRoy =

Canadian sculptor

- Born: Hugh Alexander Cote LeRoy; October 9, 1939 (age 86); Montreal, Quebec, Canada
- Died: January 5, 2022
- Education: Montreal Museum of Fine Arts
- Known for: Sculpture
- Movement: constructivist art
- Awards: Perspectives 67' first prize

Hugh LeRoy (born October 9, 1939) is a Canadian constructivist art sculptor.

== Career ==
LeRoy was born in Montreal, Quebec. He studied with Alfred Pinsky at the art school of Sir George Williams University (now Concordia University). He went on to study as well at Montreal Museum of Fine Arts, School of Art and Design with Arthur Lismer and Louis Dudek. He was named director of the museum school in 1967. By 1967, he was creating shapes under stress as he explained during a taped interview with Dorothy Cameron:

"I...enjoy making things, useless things, which happen now to fit into a social scheme or way of life called 'contemporary art' by our fickle culture assessors. That is why I am against intellectualizing about art, especially about minimal art or sculpture, where such an elaborate framework of justification is demanded....I began a private search for fundamental truth.".

His work is in the Constructivist art style and has been installed in numerous locations across Canada. Four Elements Column (1967) is located in René-Lévesque Park in Lachine, Quebec. Rainbow Piece (1972), is permanently located outside Scott Library at York University, Toronto. He participated in the 1976 exhibition Trois générations d’art québécois 1940-1950-1960 at the Musée d'art contemporain de Montréal with Red Piece, an abstract, linear sculpture of painted aluminum. The Arc & The Chord (1987) was located in the Toronto Sculpture Garden for a period of two months. In 1967, LeRoy was awarded First Prize at the Perspectives 67 competition for sculpture.

He is a professor emeritus at York University in Toronto, Ontario, Canada.

== Sculptures ==
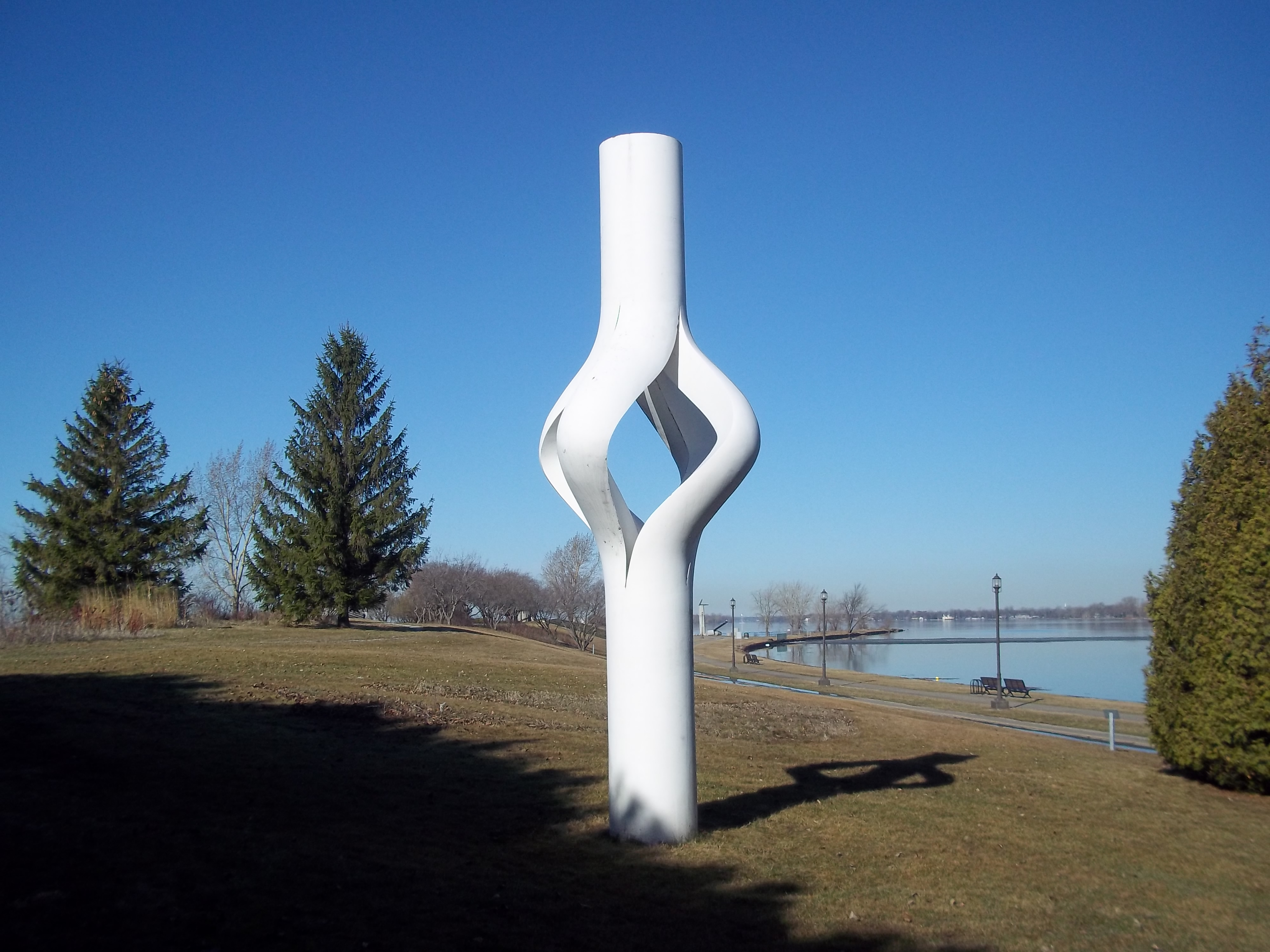
Four Elements Column

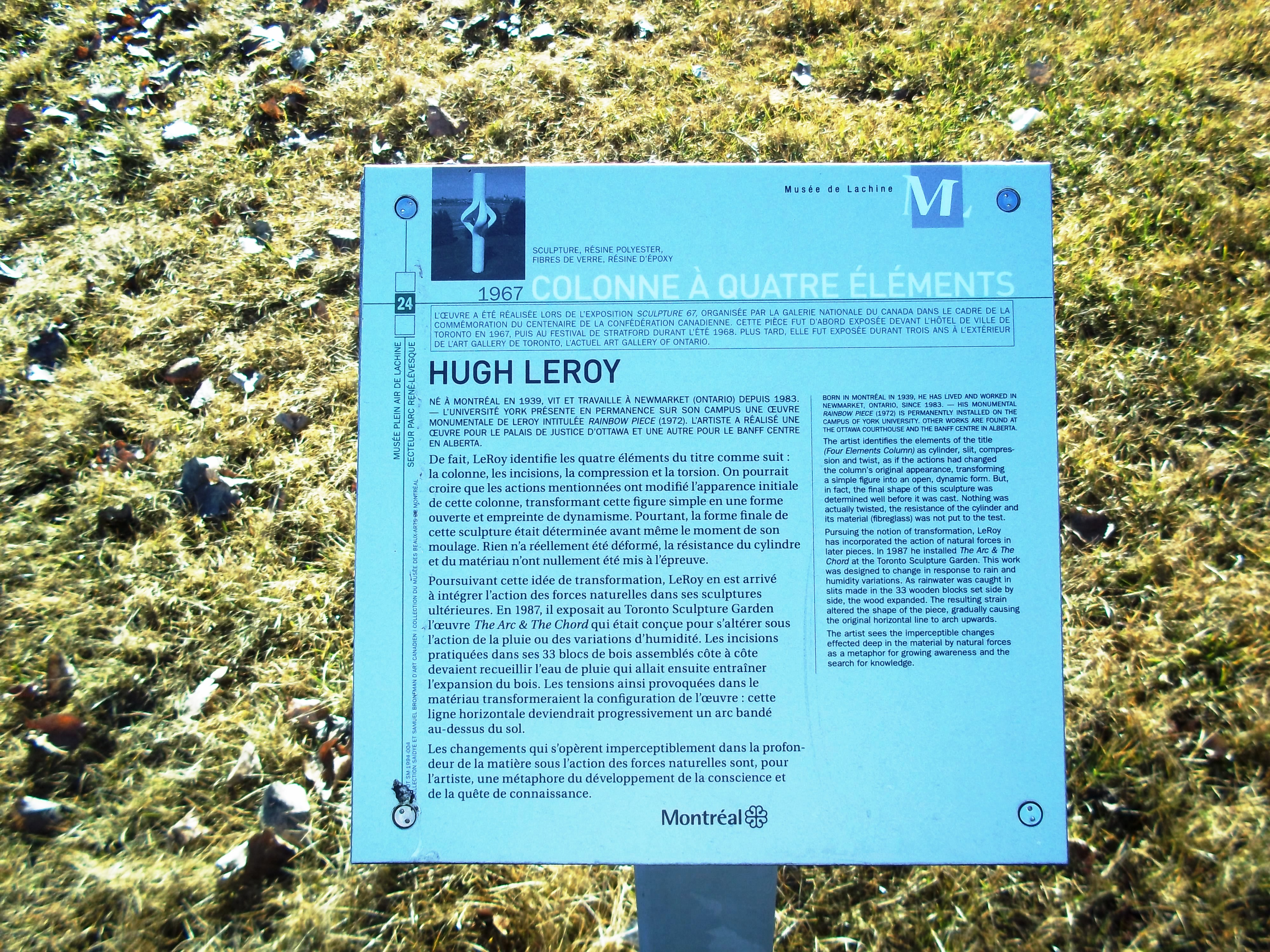
Four Elements Column, description

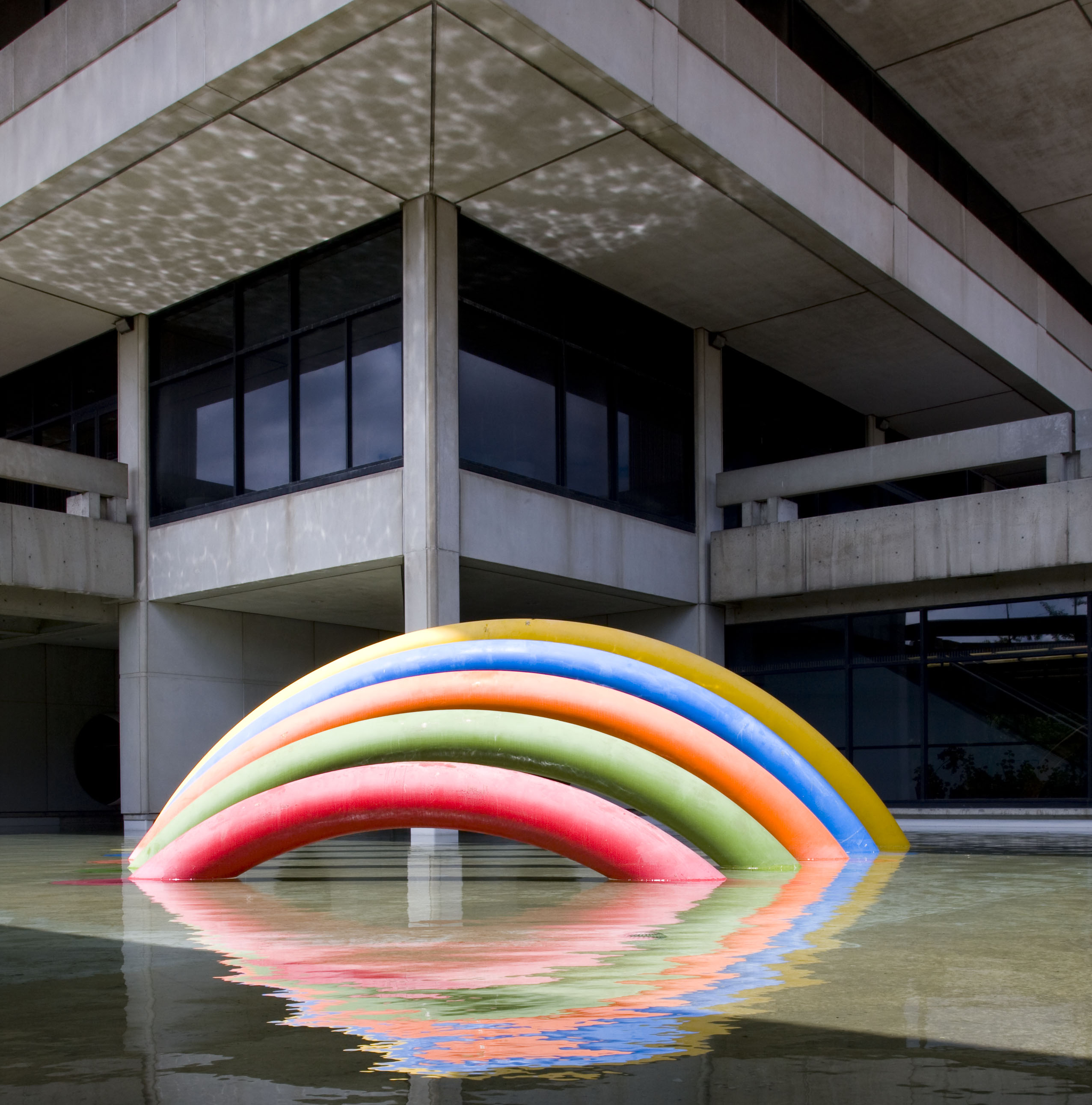
Rainbow Piece (1972)
