= Saint-Patrick Street =

Thoroughfare in Montreal, Canada

Coordinates: 45°27′30″N 73°36′38″W

Saint Patrick Street
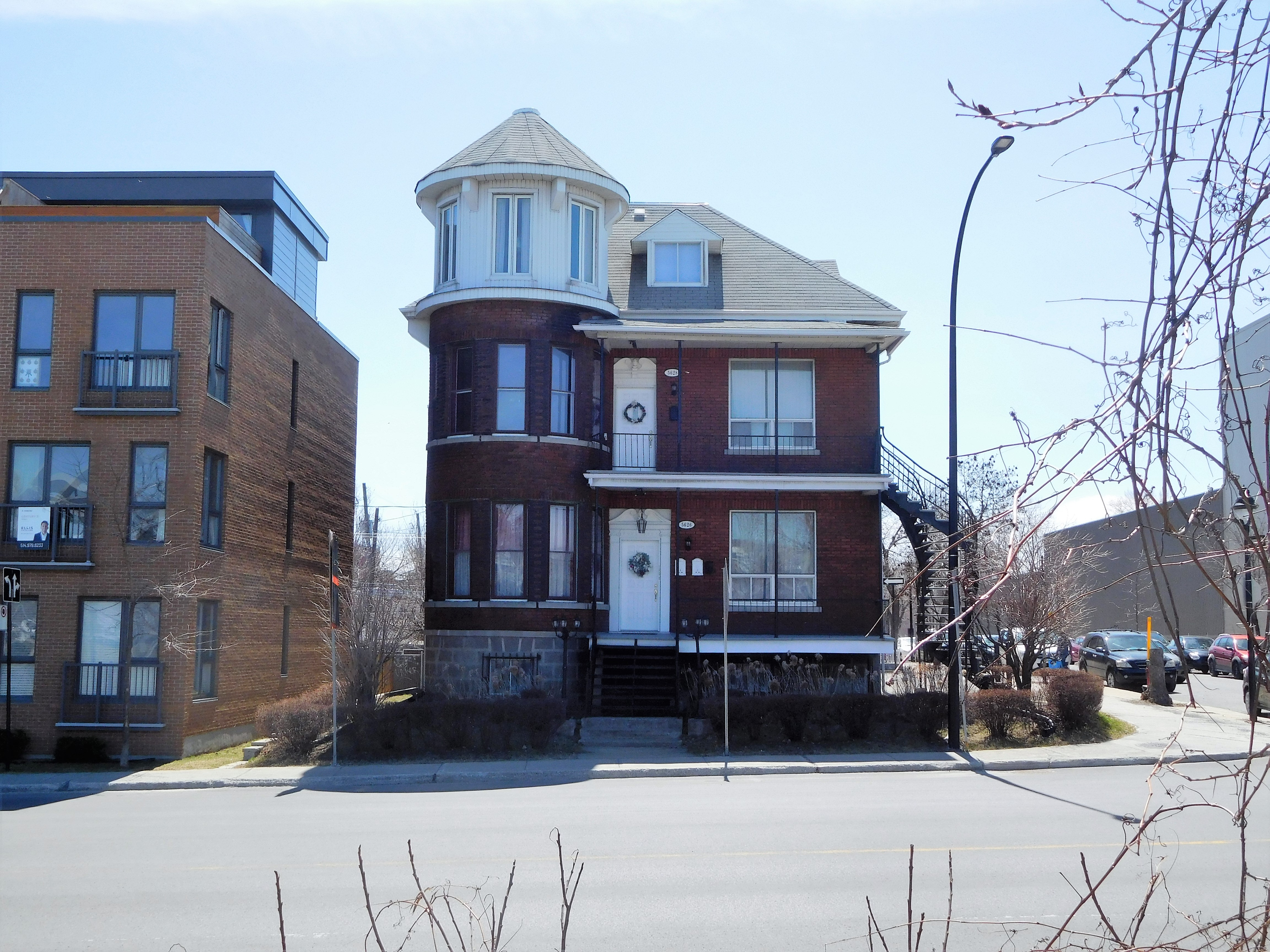
- Duplex on Saint Patrick Street in Ville-Émard
- Interactive map of Saint Patrick Street
- Native name: Rue Saint-Patrick (French)
- Former name: Saint Patrick's Street
- Length: 13 km (8.1 mi)
- Location: Montreal
- West end: Chemin du Musée, Lachine (continues as Chemin du Canal)
- East end: R-112 Wellington Street, Pointe-Saint-Charles

Construction
- Completion: before 1859

Saint Patrick Street (officially in French: Rue Saint-Patrick) is a street in Montreal, Quebec, Canada.

It runs for 13 kilometres (8.1 mi) on an east-west course (according to Montreal street directions) along the entire southern edge of the Lachine Canal. It begins at the Chemin du Musée, an extension of LaSalle Boulevard, at the canal's western entrance in the borough of Lachine, west of which it becomes the Chemin du Canal and runs along the spit of land that forms René-Lévesque Park. Proceeding eastward from here, it traverses the boroughs of Lachine and LaSalle, then the neighbourhoods of Ville-Émard, Côte-Saint-Paul, and Pointe-Saint-Charles in Le Sud-Ouest, ending at Wellington Street beside the Wellington and Peel Basins on the Saint Lawrence River.

== History ==
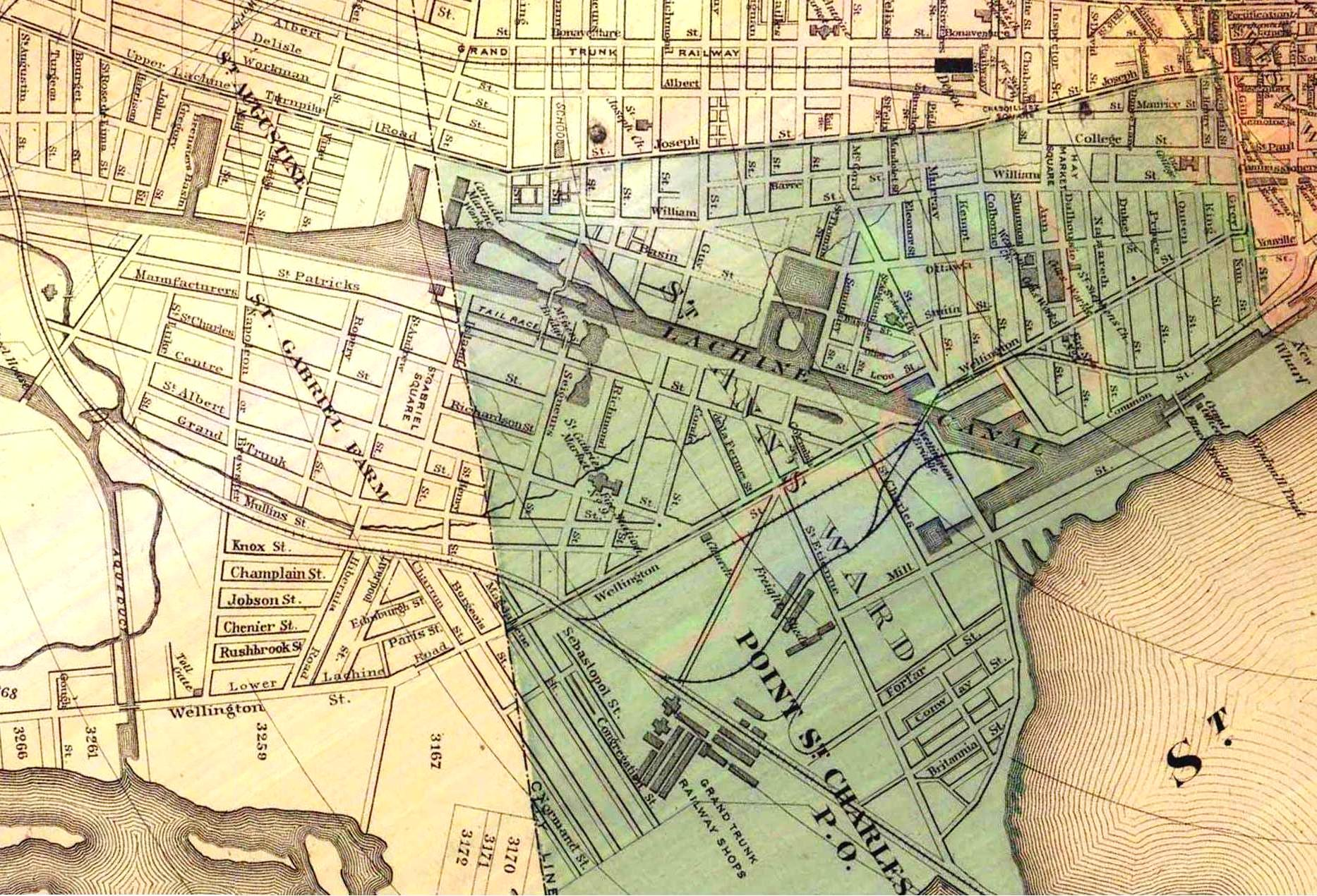
St. Patrick's Street visible on a map from 1859, running only from Wellington Street (centre right) to the CPR tracks (centre left)

The street is named for Saint Patrick, the patron saint of Ireland, and has one of many Irish-inspired street names in Pointe-Saint-Charles, which along with neighbouring Griffintown was the traditional home of Montreal's Irish community. The Pointe-Saint-Charles portion of the street is the original, with a map from 1859 showing the street terminating at the Canadian Pacific Railway crossing in this district; it was later extended westward.

== Features ==
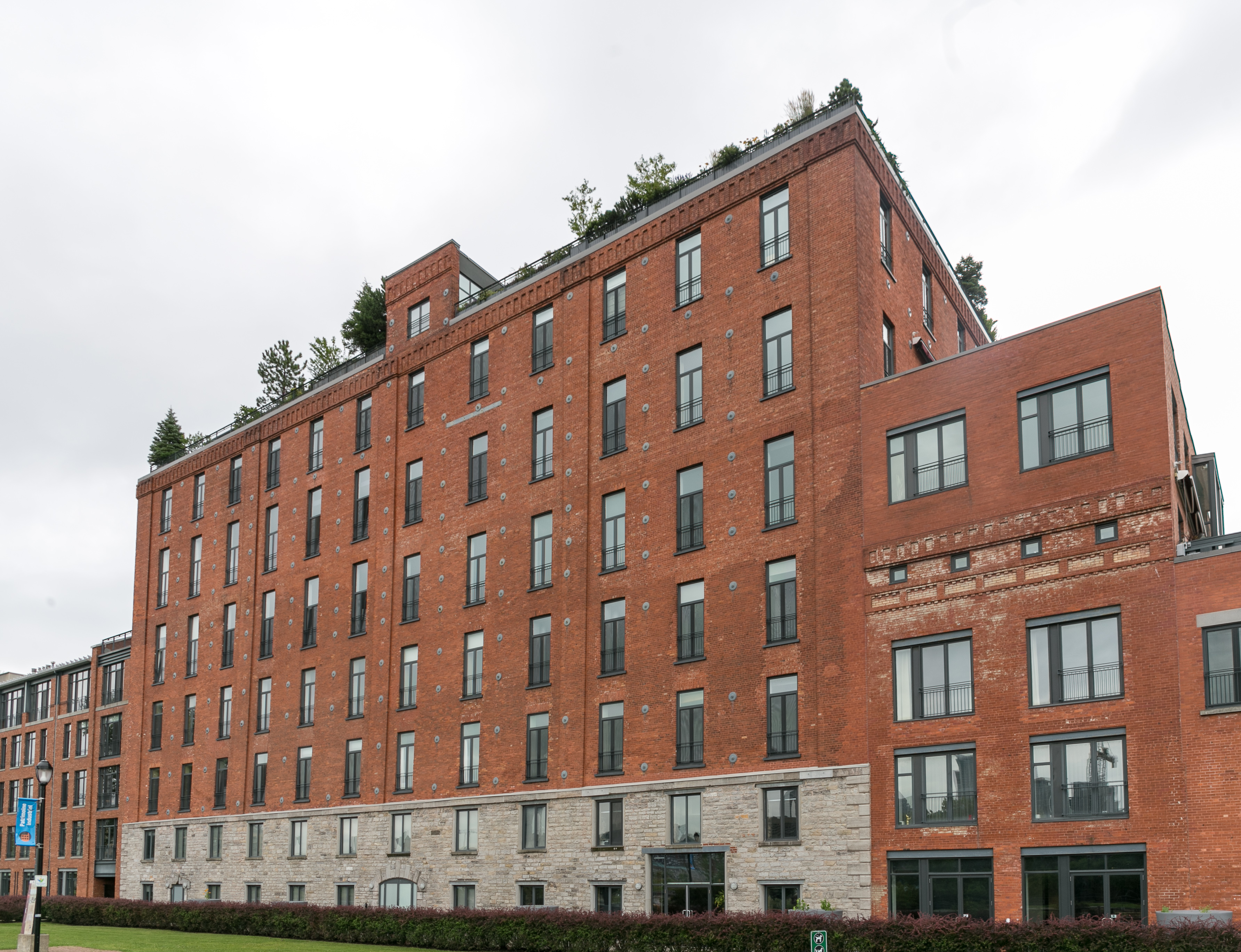
Former Redpath Sugar refinery building

The street is mainly industrial, especially in its western sections between René-Lévesque Park and Autoroute 15. Redpath Sugar formerly operated a sugar refinery at 1396 Saint Patrick Street in Pointe-Saint-Charles. The street also contains residential portions, including in Ville-Émard.

A bicycle path runs along the Lachine Canal parallel to this street. This path also continues eastward past Wellington Street, turning north to meet the Bonaventure Expressway and Old Port. Bicycle rentals are available at the Ma Bicyclette shops at the corner of Rue Thomas-Keefer, near the Atwater Market.
