= LaSalle Boulevard =

Boulevard in Montreal, Canada

LaSalle Boulevard (officially in French: Boulevard LaSalle) is a north–south thoroughfare located in Montreal, Quebec, Canada.

This boulevard is 13 kilometers long and is the continuation of Lachine Museum Road (annex to Saint Joseph Boulevard) at the intersection of Saint Patrick Street. It crosses the boroughs of LaSalle and Verdun and ends by becoming Rue d'Argenson in the Sud-Ouest borough east of the Autoroute 15 viaduct.

== Notable sites ==
- Hôpital de Verdun
- Lachine Rapids
- LaSalle station
