= Bill Vazan =

Canadian artist (born 1933)

- Born: 1933 (age 92–93); Toronto, Ontario, Canada
- Education: Ontario College of Art; École des beaux-arts
- Known for: environmental artist, sculptor, painter and photographer
- Awards: Governor General's Award in Visual and Media Arts (2016)

Bill Vazan RCA (born 1933) is a Canadian artist, known for land art, sculpture, painting and photography. His work has been exhibited in North America and internationally.

== Career ==
Born in Toronto, Ontario, Vazan studied Fine Arts at the Ontario College of Art in Toronto, and at the École des beaux-arts in Paris. In 1970, he graduated with a B.A. from Sir George Williams University, now Concordia University, in Montreal, Quebec. He currently lives and works in Montreal. Since 1982, he has taught at the Université du Québec à Montréal.

Bill Vazan has described himself as "someone who is by nature neurotic, compulsive and obsessive". Starting in the late 1960s, he has made journeys in Montreal and Toronto, and later across Canada and around the world, documenting the journeys in sequences of photographs, maps and notes. The pictures are constrained by a self-imposed protocol such as recording every bus stop or street intersection from exactly the same spatial direction without regard to lighting or composition. The work consists of the line of photographs in the itinerary rather than the individual images. In his projects Canada Line (1969–1970), Worldline (1969–1971) and Intercommunication Lines (1968/2002), Vazan used lines of black tape on the ground to virtually link the locations, symbolically eliminating distance and time.

Bill Vazan's conceptual and minimalist land art projects of the 1960s and 1970s were often ephemeral, created by chalk lines, arrangements of stones and so on, and now only surviving through photographs, books and videos. He created "Canada in Parentheses" in collaboration with Ian Wallace in August 1969. Working simultaneously, each artist created a crescent-shaped form: Wallace on the west coast and Vazan on the east coast. Vazan created other controversial land art projects on the Plains of Abraham in Quebec City (1979), on the Nazca plains in Peru (1984–1986), in Utah and Nevada (1993), in Gotland, Sweden (1997) and in the mountains of Thebes in Egypt (2001). In some of these works, Vazan created quasi-mythical sculptures, including rock engravings that resemble Aztec, Mayan, or Celtic art.

Bill Vazan considers that nature and humanity are profoundly linked. His work investigates the human-cosmos relationship. In these works, what is important is not what is seen but what is unseen and unknown - the "cosmological shadows".

Vazan's work can be found in multiple institutions, such as the Musée de Lachine and the National Gallery of Canada. He was made a member of the Royal Canadian Academy of Arts. In 2016, he received the Governor General's Award in Visual and Media Arts. Vazan's archives are located at the Canadian Centre for Architecture.

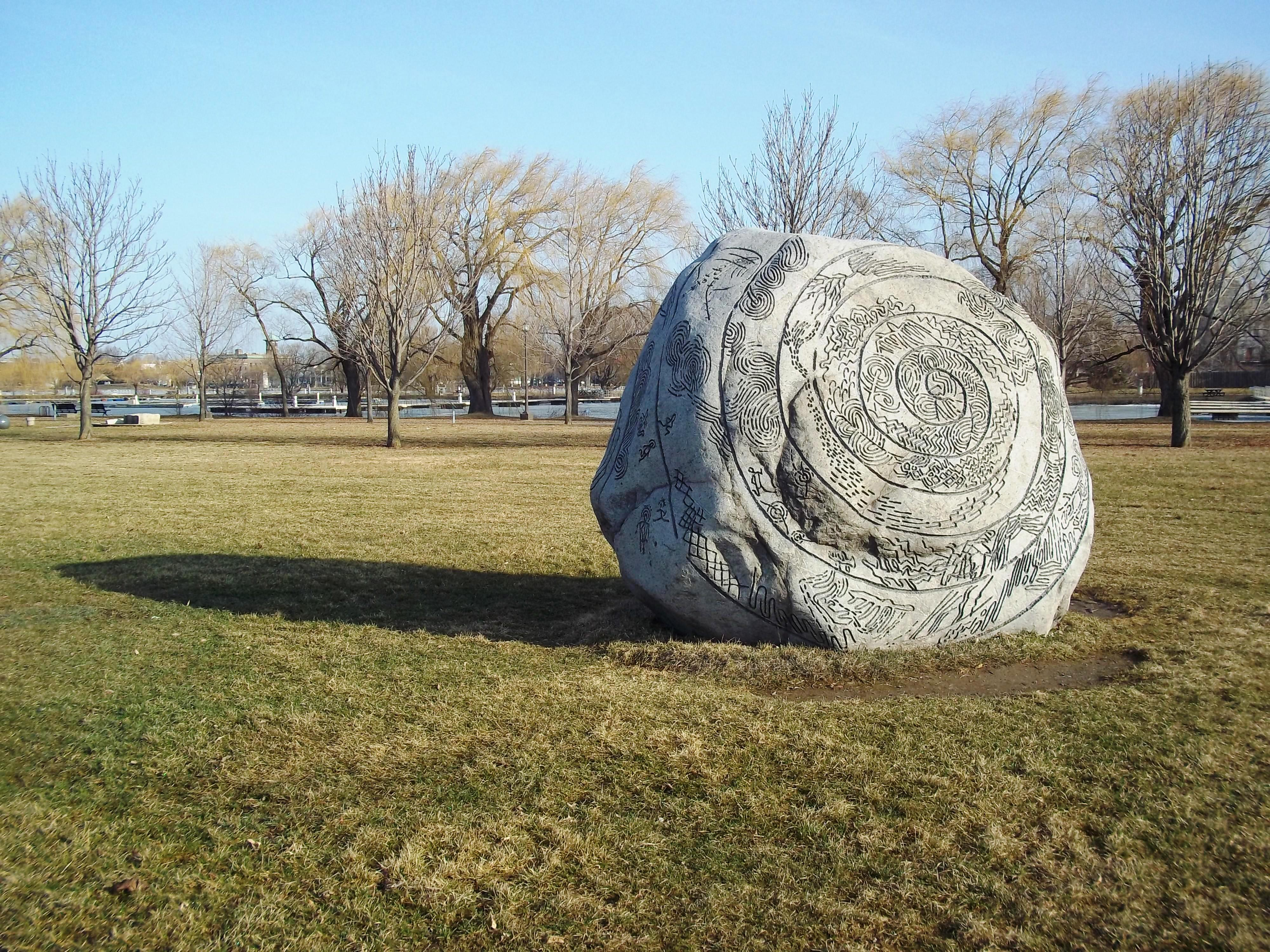
Story Rock, 1986

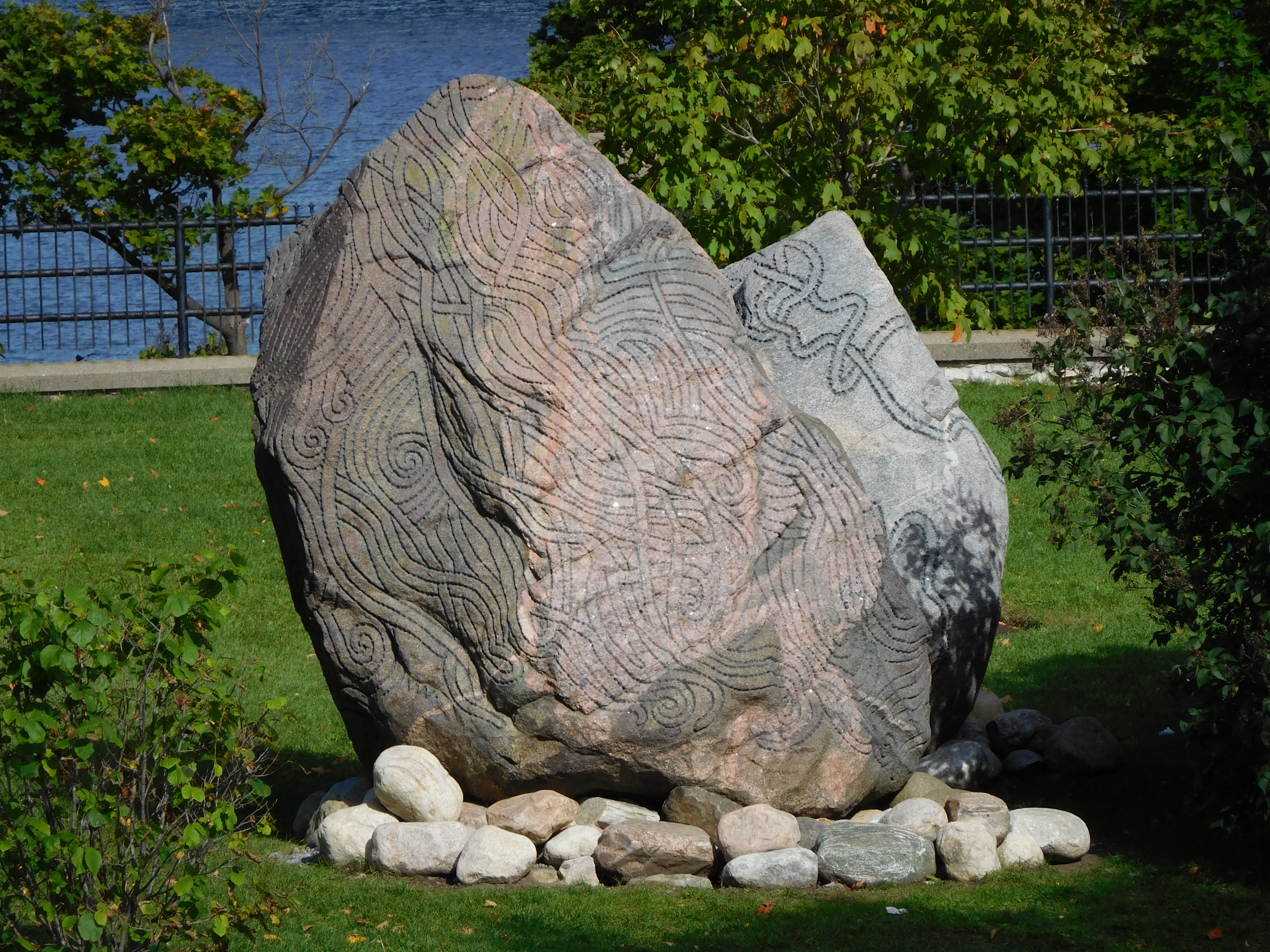
Black Nest, 1991

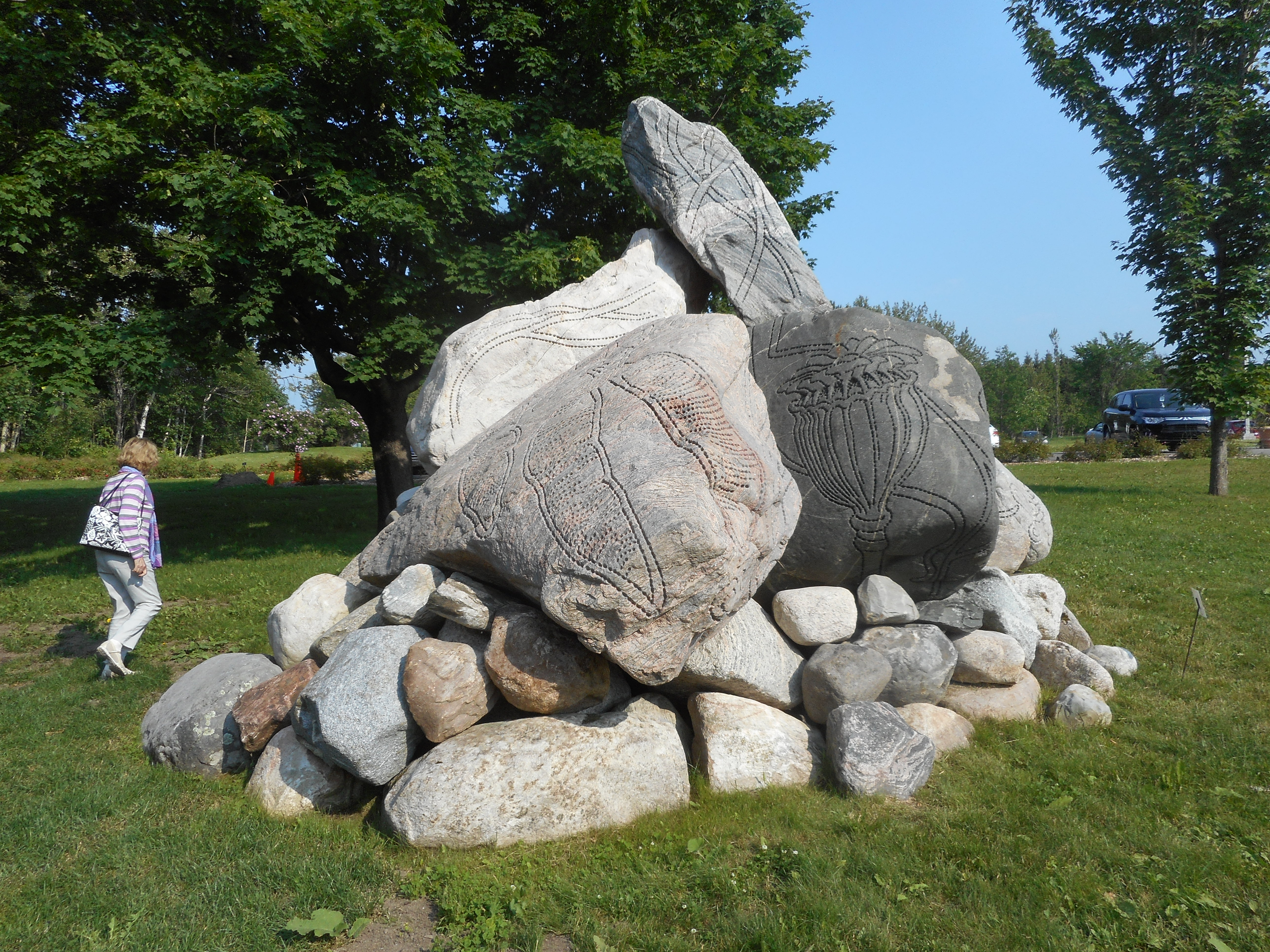
Mirages, 2002

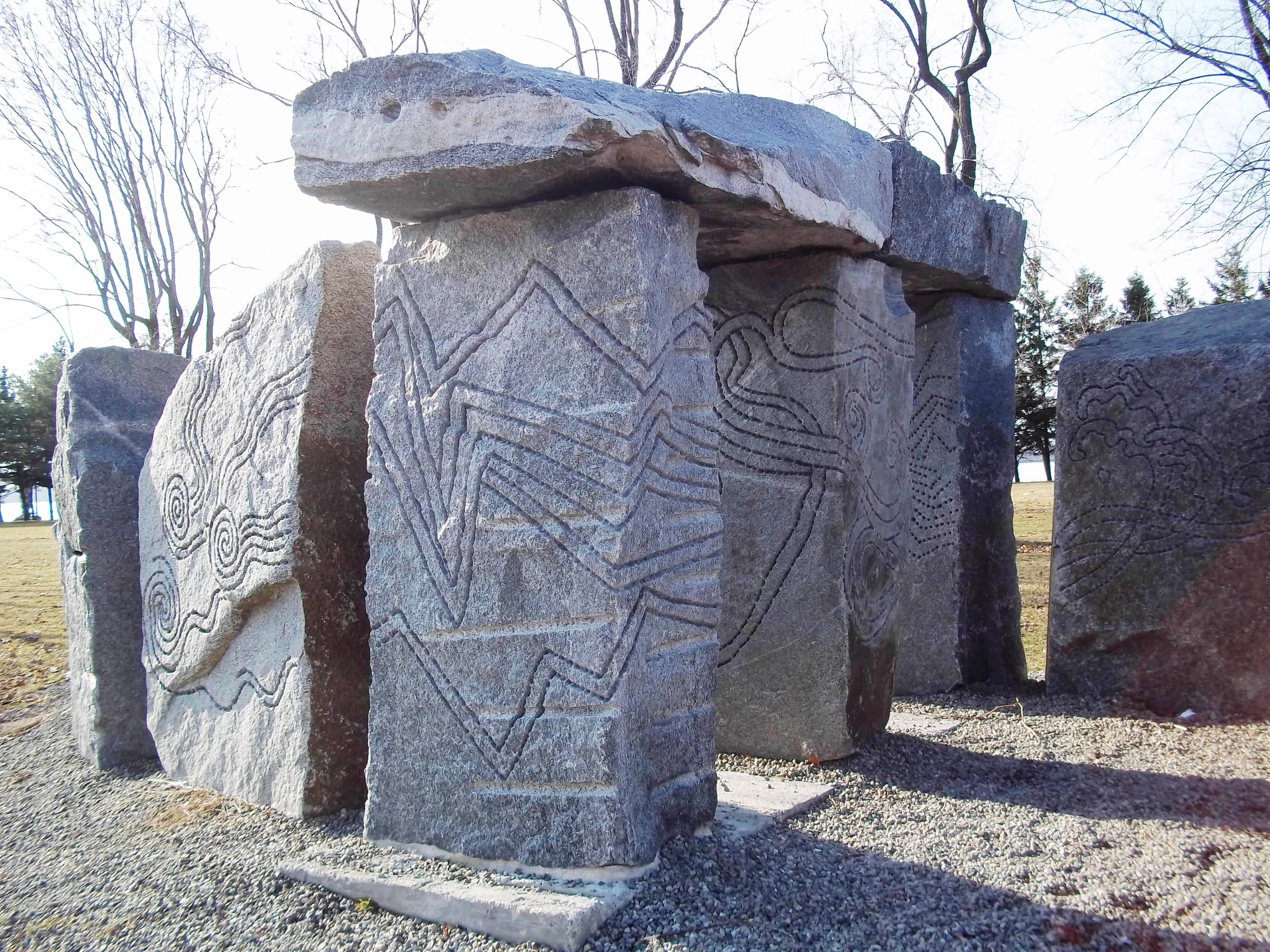
Vortexit II, 2009

== Solo exhibitions ==
Bill Vazan has exhibited in numerous group exhibitions, and in the following solo exhibitions:

- 2005 Cosmological Shadows Musée régional de la Côte Nord, Sept-Îles, Quebec
- 2004 Cosmological Shadows Nickle Arts Museum, University of Calgary, Calgary
- 2004 Cosmological Shadows Centre d'exposition de l'Université de Montréal, Montreal
- 2003 Cosmological Shadows Canadian Museum of Contemporary Photography, Ottawa
- 2002 Surface Centre des arts contemporains du Québec à Montréal, Montreal
- 2002 Soundings From The Water Planet, (selection) Deleon White Gallery, Toronto, Ontario.
- 2002 Soundings From The Water Planet. Surface CACQM, Montreal, Quebec.
- 2001 Cosmological Shadows Musée national des beaux-arts du Québec (Expo. Itinérante)
- 1999 Jumpgates 2000 Art Gallery of Peterborough, Ontario.
- 1997 Complicité: Cambodge, 1997 Espace 502, Montreal, Quebec.
- 1994 Regard sur l'œuvre photographique 1981-1994; De l'autre coté du miroir Musée d'art de Joliette. Joliette, Quebec.
- 1994 Sculpture, Paintings and Photos Galerie Dresdnere, Toronto, Ontario.
- 1993 Photowrite Kibbutz Art Gallery, Tel-Aviv, Israel.
- 1992 A Cosmic Dance Agnes Etherington Art Centre, Queen's University, Kingston, Ontario.
- 1989 Unfolding & Heaping, 49th Parallel Canadian Contemporary Art Centre, New York City, USA.
- 1989 Recent Works Eye-Level Gallery, Halifax, Nova Scotia.
- 1989 Mind Frames White Water Gallery, North Bay Firefields, North Bay, Ontario.
- 1989 Mind Frames Struts Gallery, Sackville, New Brunswick
- 1981 Mind Frames - Recent Land and Photoworks Winnipeg Art Gallery; Manitoba.
- 1981 Mind Frames Norman Mackenzie Art Gallery, Regina, Saskatchewan.
- 1981 Mind Frames Art Gallery of Windsor, Ontario.
- 1980 Suites photographiques récentes et œuvres sur le terrain Musée d'art contemporain de Montréal, Montreal, Quebec. (exposition itinérante)
- 1979 œuvres et documentation photographique La chambre blanche, Quebec City, Quebec.
- 1977 Visual Spheres: Photo Scannings Galerie Gilles Gheerbrant, Montreal, Quebec.
- 1977 œuvres planétaires Galerie Shandar, Paris, France.
- 1976 Paris Scannings International Cultural Centre, Antwerp, Belgium
- 1975 Obras recientes Centro de arte y comunicacion, Buenos Aires
- 1975 Obras recientes Gilles Gheerbrant, Montreal, Quebec.
- 1975 Trajectoires solaires Galerie d'art de l'Université de Sherbrooke, Quebec.
- 1974 Contacts Musée d'art contemporain, Montréal, Quebec.
- 1974 Champs de Force Mezzanine Gallery, Nova Scotia College of Art, Halifax.
- 1970 Maps & Movings A Space, Toronto, Ontario.
- 1969 Taped Sculpture Court Art Gallery of Ontario, Toronto, Ontario.
- 1968 1 + 2 + 3 Galerie Libre, Montreal, Quebec.
