= Gilles Boisvert (artist) =

Canadian artist and sculptor

Gilles Boisvert (born February 16, 1940) is a Canadian artist and sculptor.

== Early career ==
Gilles Boisvert was born in Montreal, Quebec, Canada. He studied at the Montreal School of Fine Arts, starting in 1958, and later studied etching and engraving under Albert Dumouchel.

== Artistic experience ==
Gilles Boisvert has spent periods of residence in Mexico, California and Paris, France and has held over forty solo exhibitions in Canada and abroad. He has held major solo exhibitions at the Montreal Museum of Contemporary Art, the Musée d'art contemporain des Laurentides and the Musée national des beaux-arts du Québec. His works are included in major collections in Canada, the U.S., the U.K. and Japan. His is one of the founding members of Atelier de l'Ïle located in Val-David, Québec.

== Style and technique ==
Gilles Boisvert is of the generation of artists of the sixties, on the verge of the formalists and plasticians and just after the automatists. While in the U.S. Action Painting was just finishing and Pop-Art starting, Boisvert chose to be one of the pioneers of an original art form, closer to people, that would later come to be known as the Quebec Pop-Art movement. Highly prolific and avantgarde, Gilles Boisvert has worked at engraving, lithography, photography, drawing, painting, cinema, installations and sculpture. In addition, in the 1990s, he developed an interest in computer graphics and website design, leading to work in the multimedia field. He has also created more than a dozen monumental works that are on public display at buildings in Canada and the U.S.

== Major works ==
- 1966, Candide, installation
- 1968, Opération Déclic, serigraphy on paper
- 1969, The BP. Snow Tire, acrylic on canvas, transfer
- 1972, Oui, je me cache, (part of the album Les Oiseaux) serigraphy
- 1973, Radio Canada, mural, 10’ X 90’, Montreal, Quebec
- 1978, Québec Provincial Police Building, 8 murals, Quebec City, Quebec
- 1982, Centre d’Accueil Dante, 5 murals, copper relief, Montreal, Quebec
- 1983, Centre Eloria Lepage, mural, copper relief, 8' x 38' Montreal, Quebec
- 1984, The Terrace at Turnberry, mural, zinc and steel relief, 13’ x 7’ x 2" Miami, Florida
- 1986, Vanier College, polychrome wood relief, ±25’ x 8’, St. Laurent, Quebec
- 1986, Vive l'eau, Nordic Prince, cruise ship (home port: Miami, Florida), mural, acrylic on canvas, 3’ X 16’
- 1988, Théâtre La Licorne, sculptured intervention on doors, 9’ x 3.5’, Montreal, Quebec
- 1988, Vire au vent, painted steel and raw steel, Lachine, Quebec
- 1989, L’homme Volant, Raymond Lacombe Transport, sculpture, painted copper and wood, 8’ x 9’ x 3’, Montreal, Quebec
- 1994, Grand geste-couleur, Ste-Thérèse High School, polychrome wood relief, 8’ x 25’, Ste-Thérèse, Quebec
- 1987-95, L'Arbre des generations, sculpture, painted steel, Lachine, Quebec
- 2006, Le presse-oiseau, sculpture, Tinted wood, 13' x 6' x 3', symposium on sculpture Ombre et lumière, Saint-Faustin, Quebec
