= Michel Goulet (sculptor) =

Canadian sculptor

- Born: August 4, 1944 (age 81); Asbestos, Quebec, Canada
- Known for: sculptor, educator

Michel Goulet CM RCA (born August 4, 1944) is a Canadian sculptor.

Born in Asbestos, Quebec, Goulet has been a professor at Université du Québec à Montréal since 1987. Michel Goulet is represented by the Christopher Cutts Gallery in Toronto, ON.

== Works ==
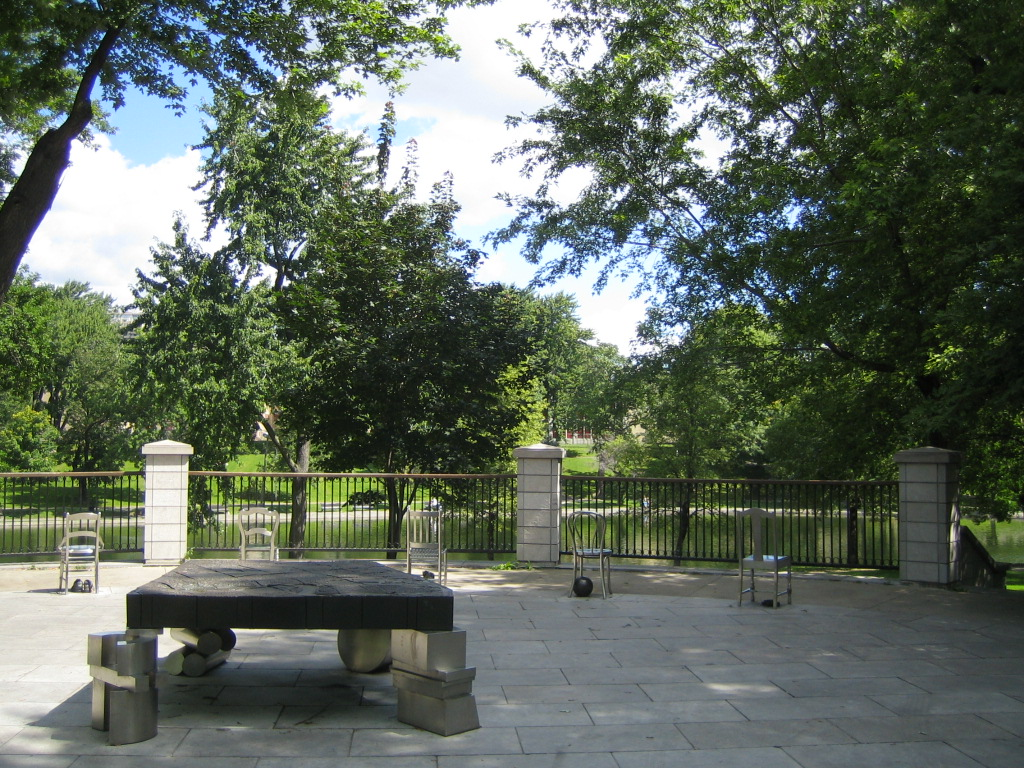
Michel Goulet (sculptor)'s Belvedere in parc Lafontaine, Duluth street, Montreal, Quebec

== Honours ==
- 1990: Prix Paul-Émile-Borduas
- 1994: Quebec Theatre Critic's Association prize for best scenography
- 2008: Governor General's Awards in Visual and Media Arts
