= George William Hill (sculptor) =

Canadian sculptor (1862–1934)

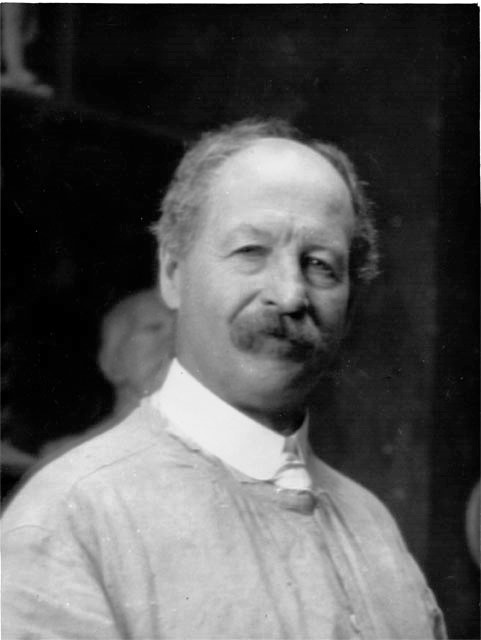
- George William Hill (circa 1920)
- Born: 8 May 1861; Shipton, Eastern Townships, Canada East
- Died: 17 July 1934 (aged 73); Outremont (Montreal)
- Known for: sculptor
- Spouse: Elsie Annette Kent

George William Hill RCA (1861 – 1934) was one of the Canada's foremost sculptors during the first half of the 20th century because of his numerous public memorials. He was elected in 1917 as a full member of the Royal Canadian Academy of Arts.

== Career ==
Hill was born in Shipton, Eastern Townships, Canada East, the son of marble cutter George Taylor Hill and his wife Eleanor A. Carty. He began to carve marble in his father's workshop and worked there for eight years and he became a chief sculptor then went to Paris in 1889 to study at the École nationale des beaux-arts with Alexandre Falguière,Jean Paul Laurens, Henri Chapu at the Académie Julian and Jean-Antoine Injalbert at the Académie Colarossi. He returned to Canada about 1894 and worked with the architects William Sutherland and Edward Maxwell. By 1897, was producing monuments. In 1902 he had won his first commission, the Strathcona and South African soldiers' memorial. Many commissions followed such as Sir George-Étienne Cartier (1912), marking the centenary of Cartier's birth.

== Selected public exhibitions ==
- Société des Artistes Français, Paris (1905);
- Royal Canadian Academy of Arts (1896, 1907, 1915, 1916, 1918, 1931, 1932);
- Art Association of Montreal;

== Selected war memorials ==
- The Lion of Belfort, 1897;
- Boer War Memorial (1907), Montreal;
- The Monument to the Heroes of the Boer War (1912), London, Ontario;
- The Sir George-Étienne Cartier Monument (1919);
- The Canadian Nursing sisters' memorial in the Parliament Buildings, Ottawa, Hall of Honour, near the entrance to the Parliamentary Library (1926);
- Sherbrooke War Memorial, 1926;
- War Memorial, Harbord Collegiate School,286 Harbord St., Toronto, Ontario;
- War Memorial, Pictou, Nova Scotia;
- War Memorial, Westmount, Montreal, Quebec;
- Charlottetown Veterans Memorial at Province House, Charlottetown, Prince Edward Island.

== Selected public collections ==
- National Gallery of Canada;
- Montreal Museum of Fine Arts;
- Musée national des beaux-arts du Québec;
- Art Gallery of Hamilton;
- Agnes Etherington Art Centre;
- Ville de Montréal;
- Ville de Sherbrooke;
- City of London, Ontario;
- City of Charlottetown;

== Works ==
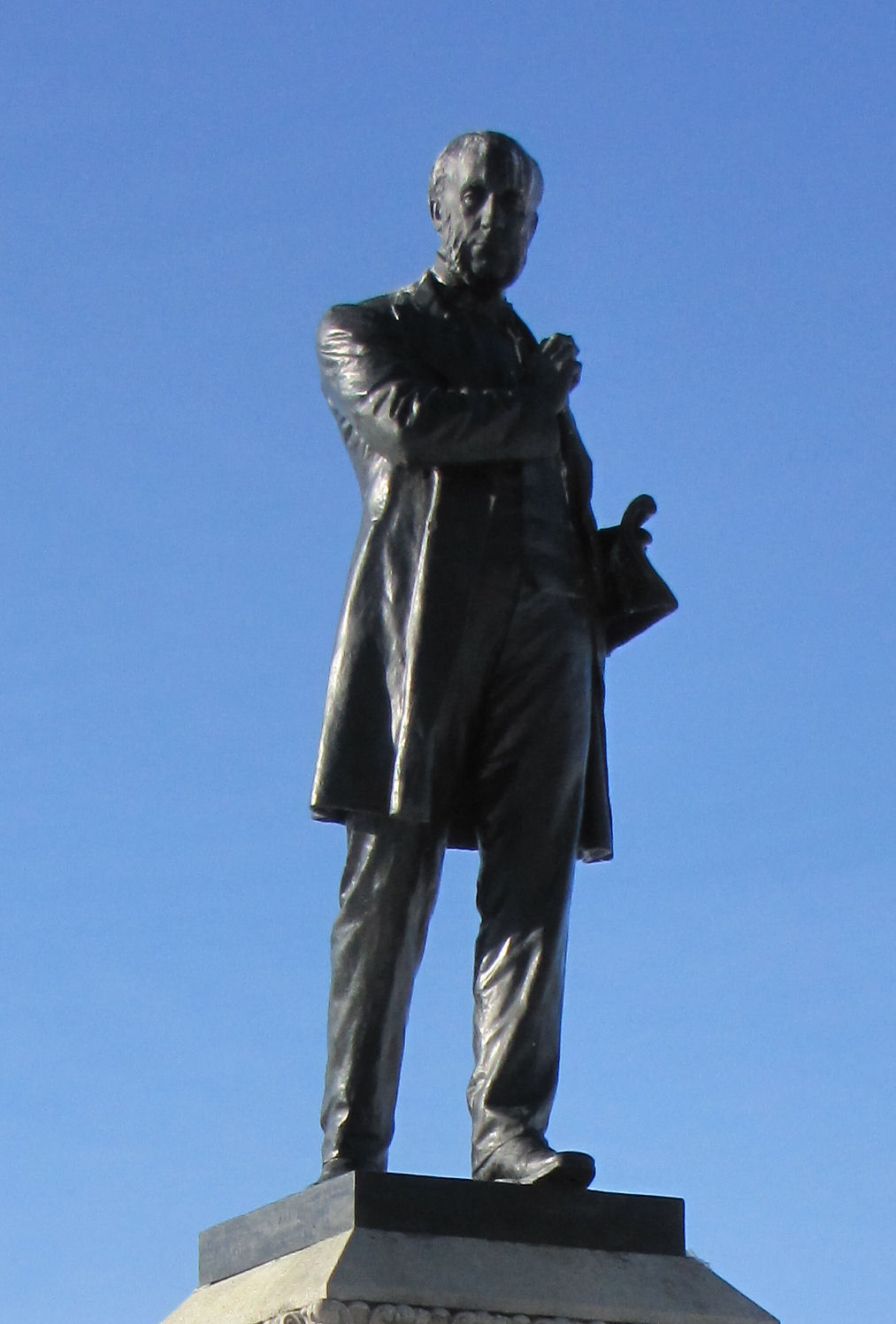
George William Hill (sculptor)'s George Brown (1913) erected at Parliament Hill Ottawa, Ontario Canada

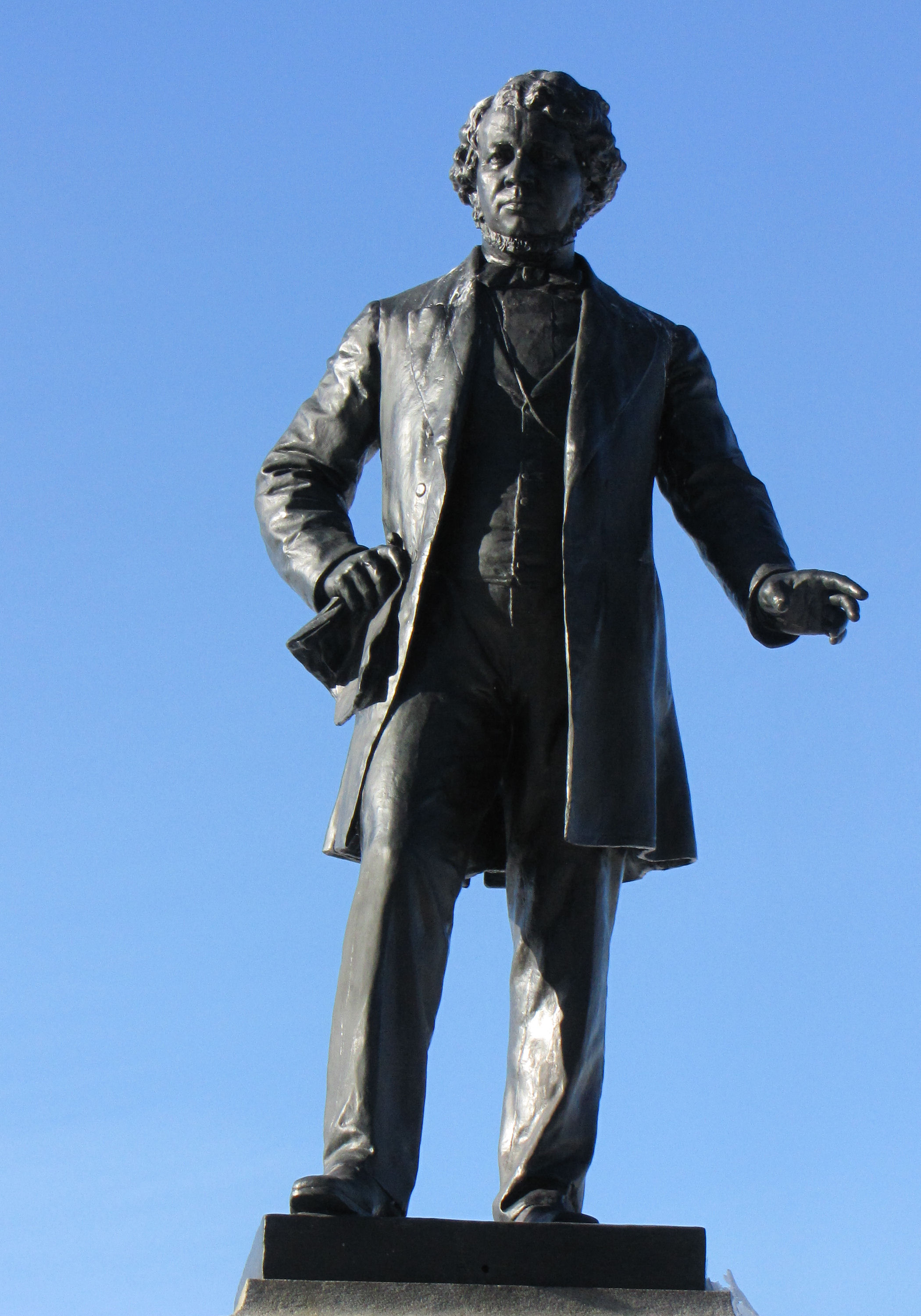
George William Hill (sculptor)'s D'Arcy McGee (1913) erected at Parliament Hill Ottawa, Ontario, Canada

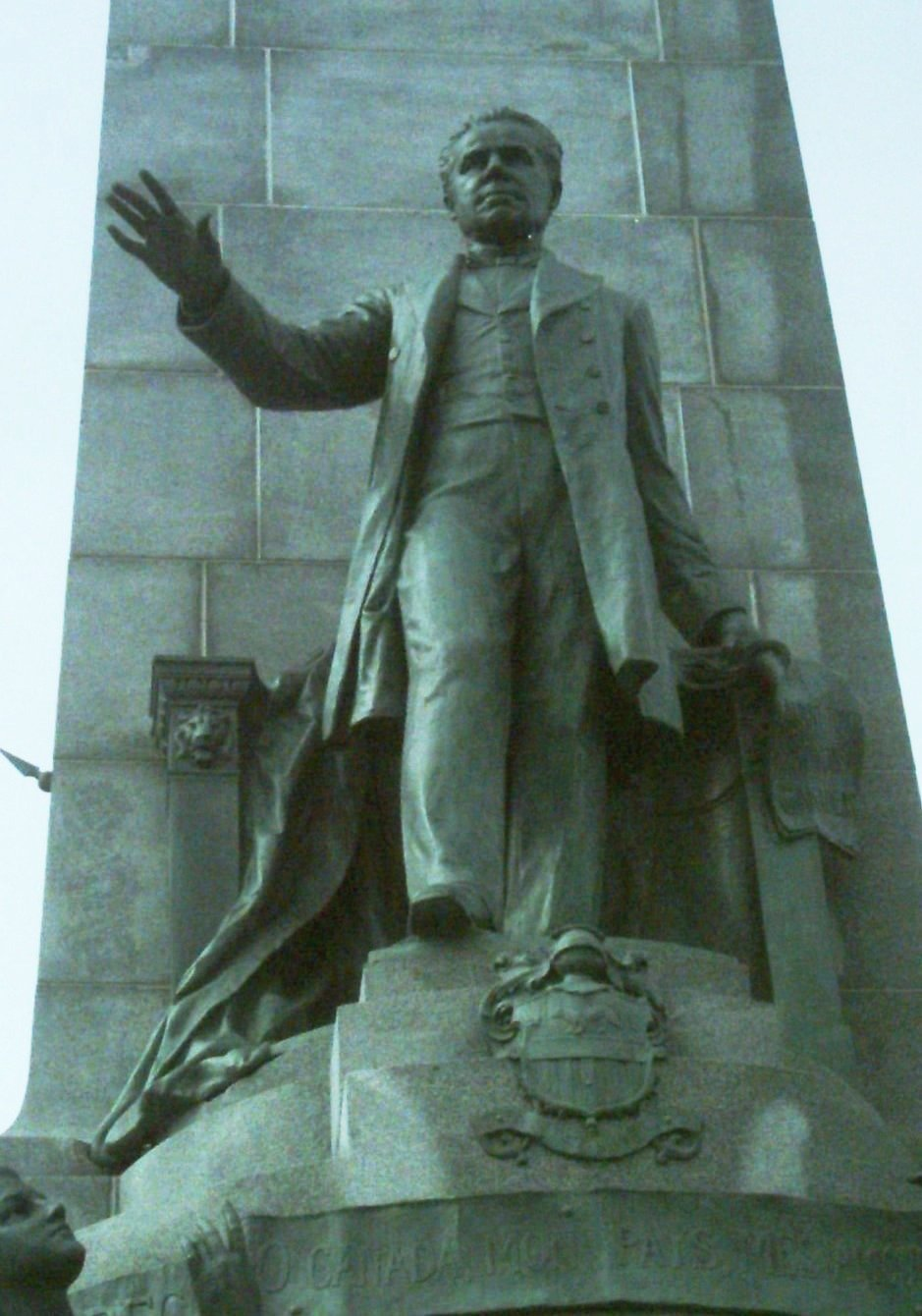
George William Hill (sculptor)'s George-Étienne Cartier Monument(1919) at Mont Royal in Montreal, Quebec, Canada

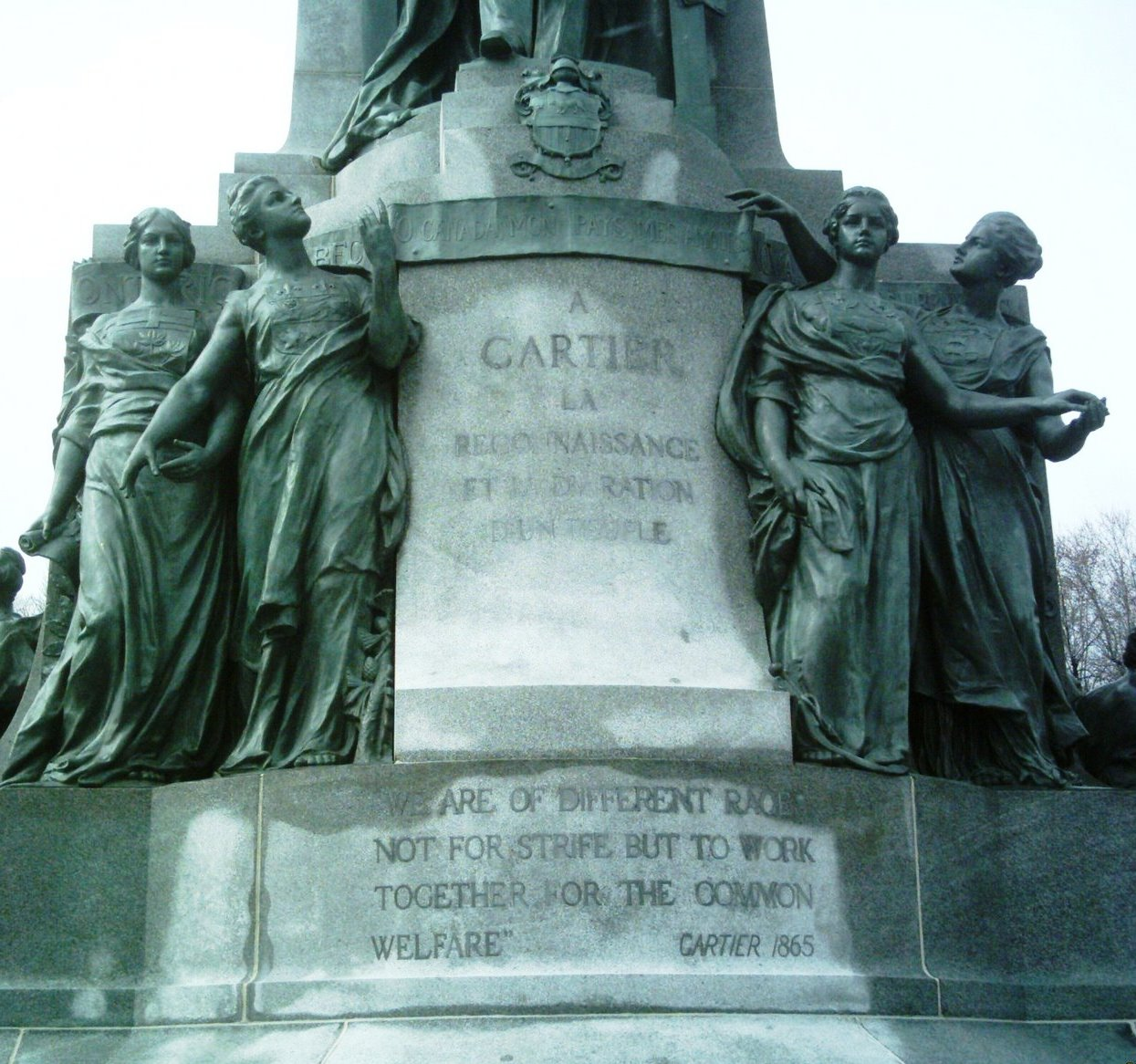
George William Hill (sculptor)'s George-Étienne Cartier Monument(1919) at Mont Royal in Montreal, Quebec, Canada

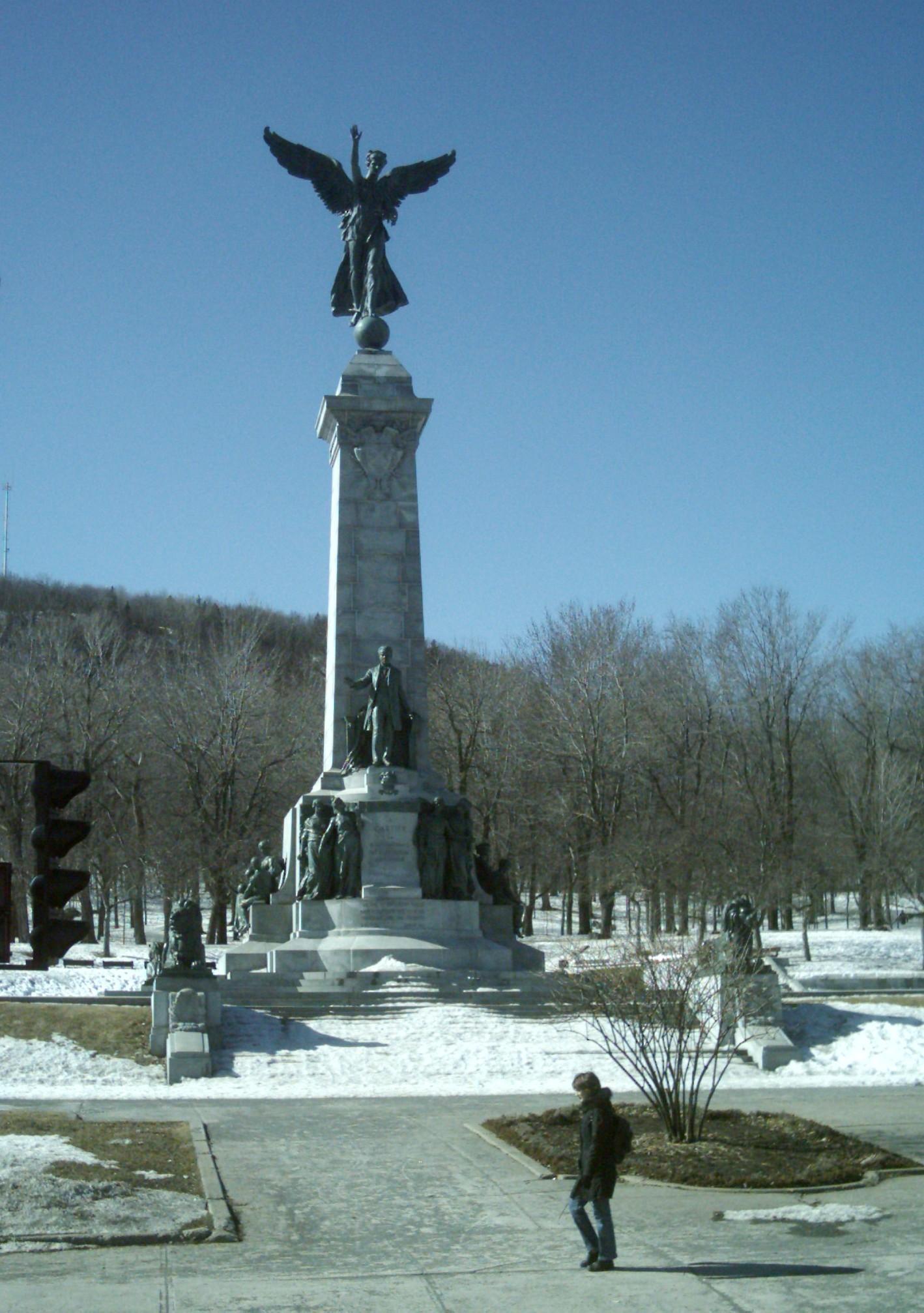
George William Hill (sculptor)'s George-Étienne Cartier Monument(1919) at Mont Royal in Montreal, Quebec, Canada

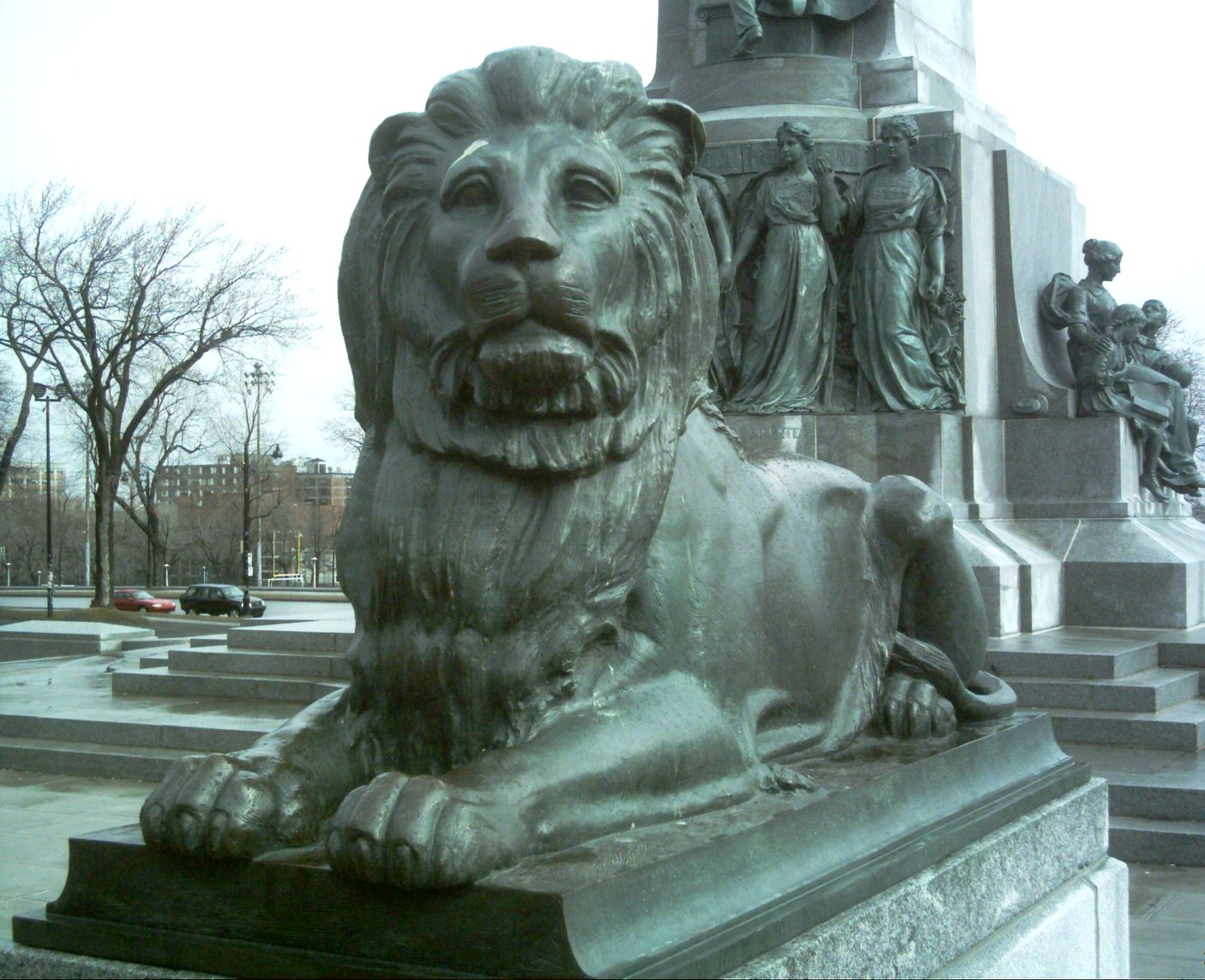
George William Hill (sculptor)'s George-Étienne Cartier Monument(1919) at Mont Royal in Montreal, Quebec, Canada

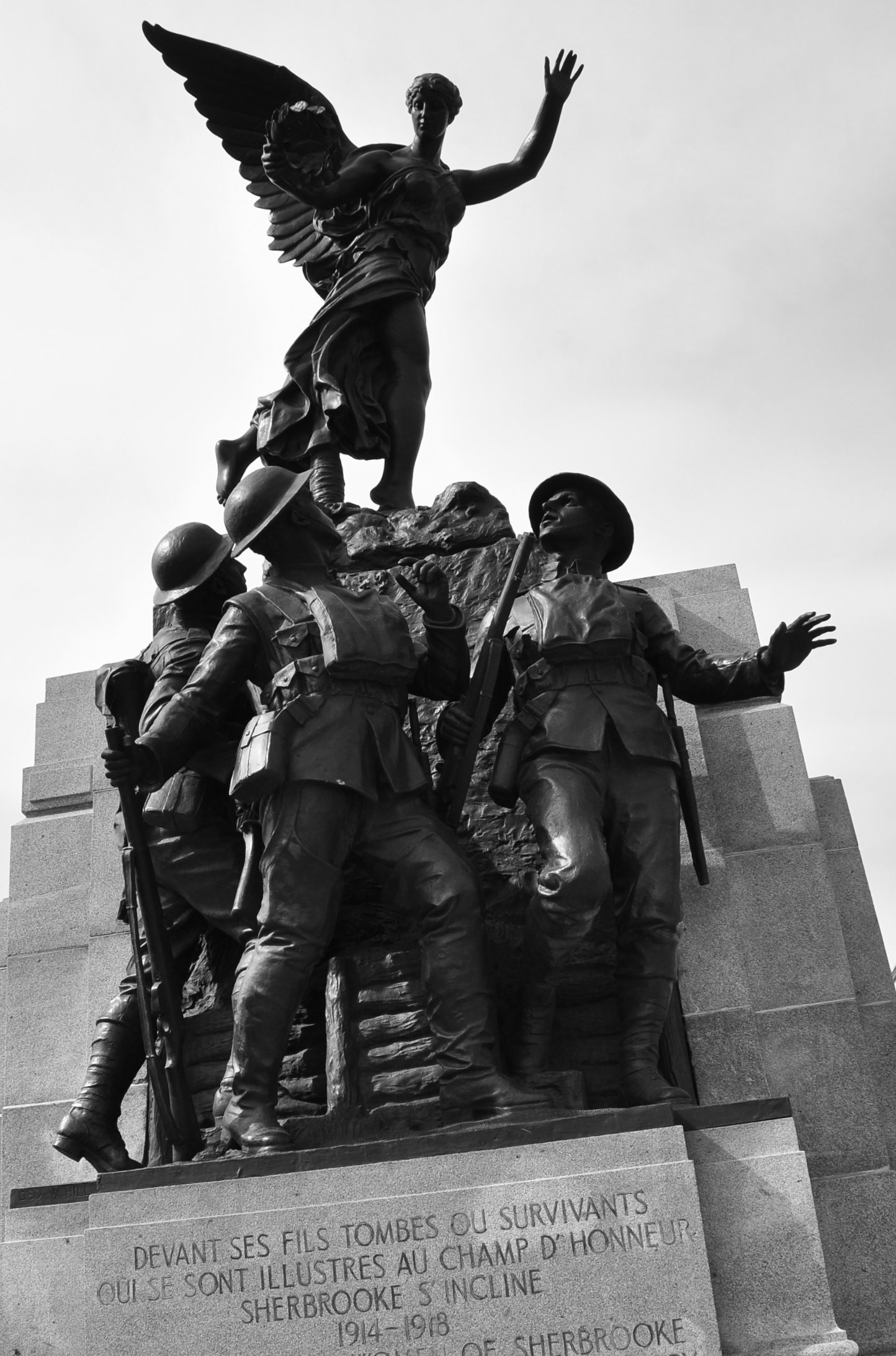
George William Hill (sculptor)'s Sherbrooke War Memorial (1926) commemorating the First World War at King Street in Sherbrooke, Quebec Canada

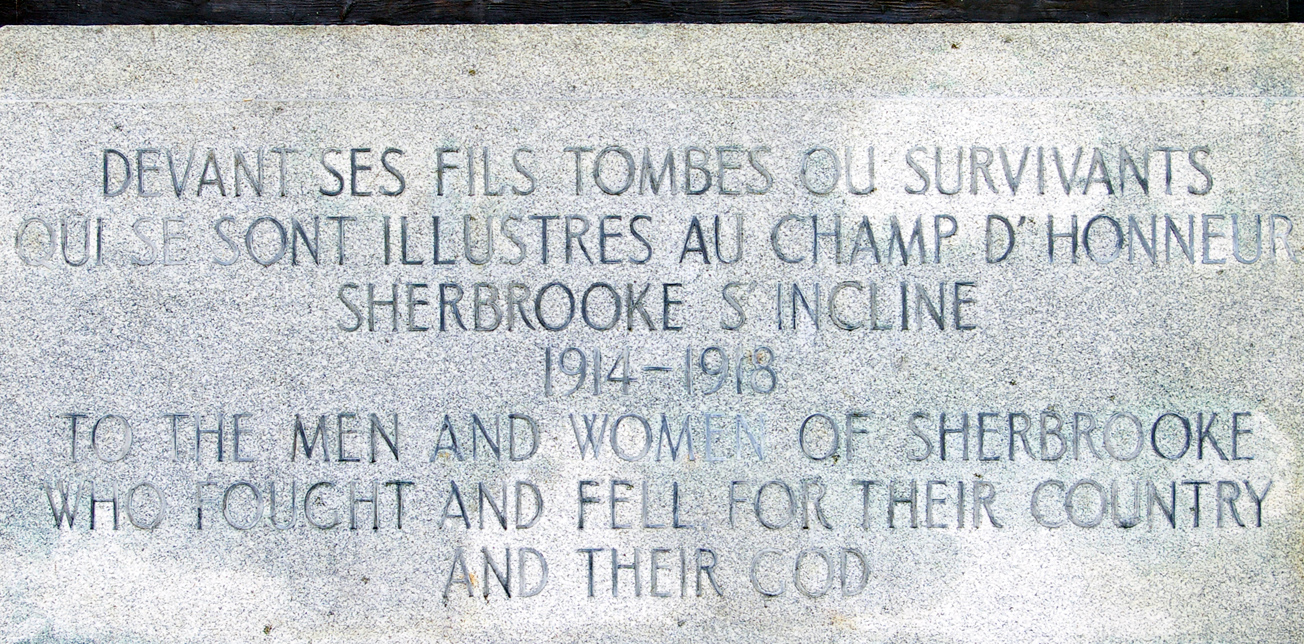
George William Hill (sculptor)'s Sherbrooke War Memorial(1926) commemorating the First World War at King Street in Sherbrooke, Quebec, Canada

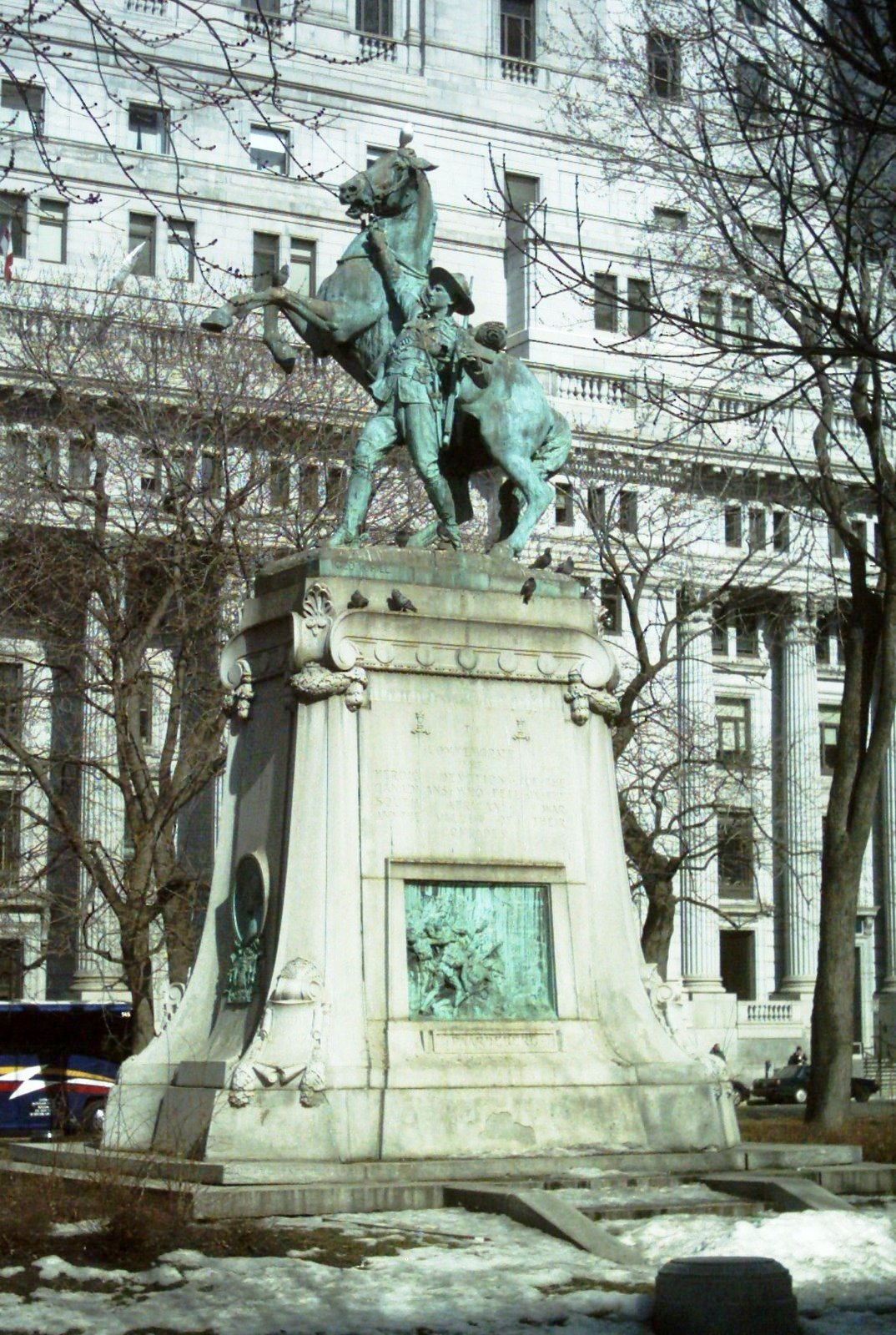
George William Hill (sculptor)'s Boer War Memorial (Montreal) (1907) in Square Dorchester,

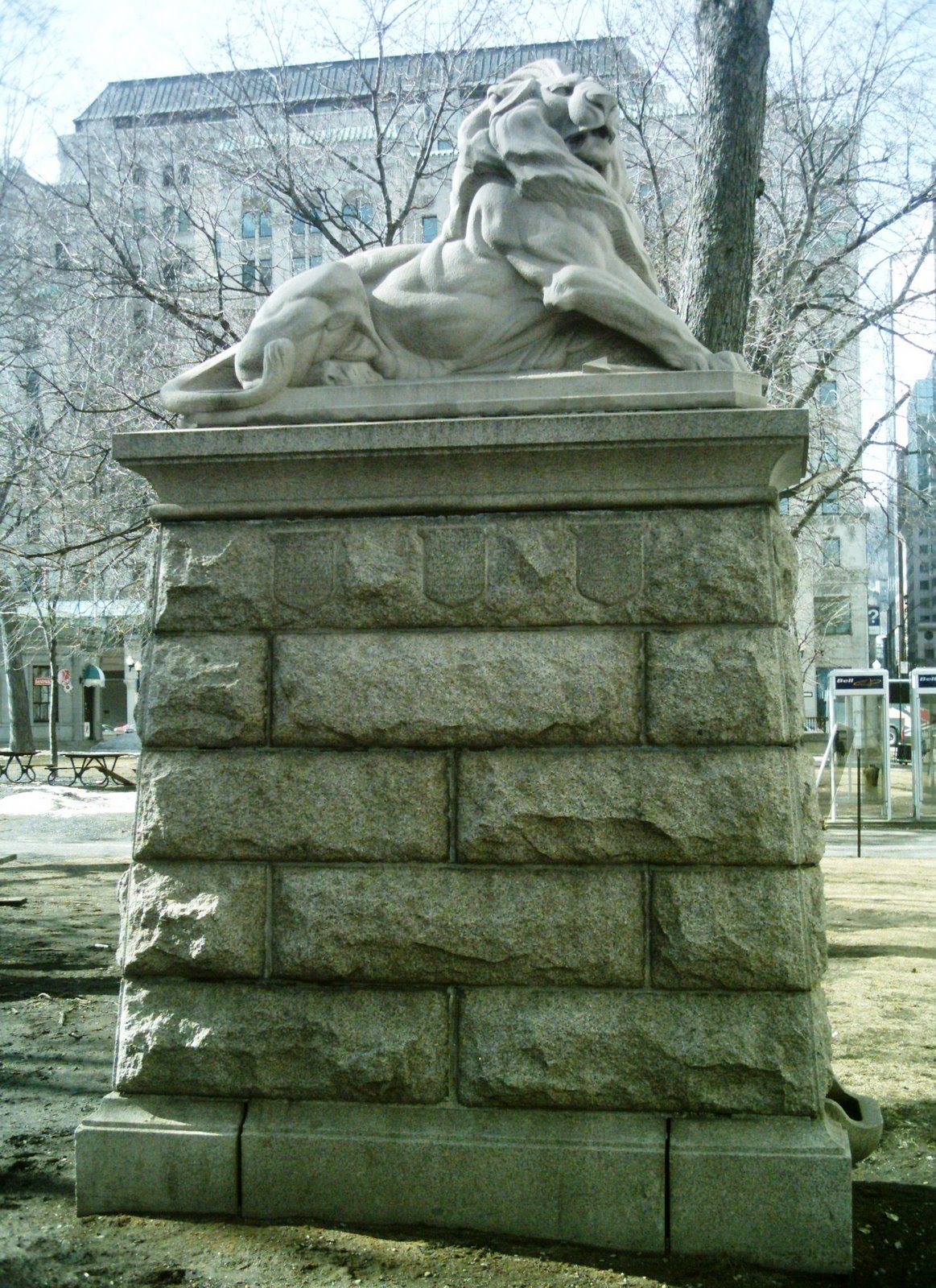
George William Hill (sculptor)'s Lion of Belfort (Montreal) in Square Dorchester, Montreal, Quebec

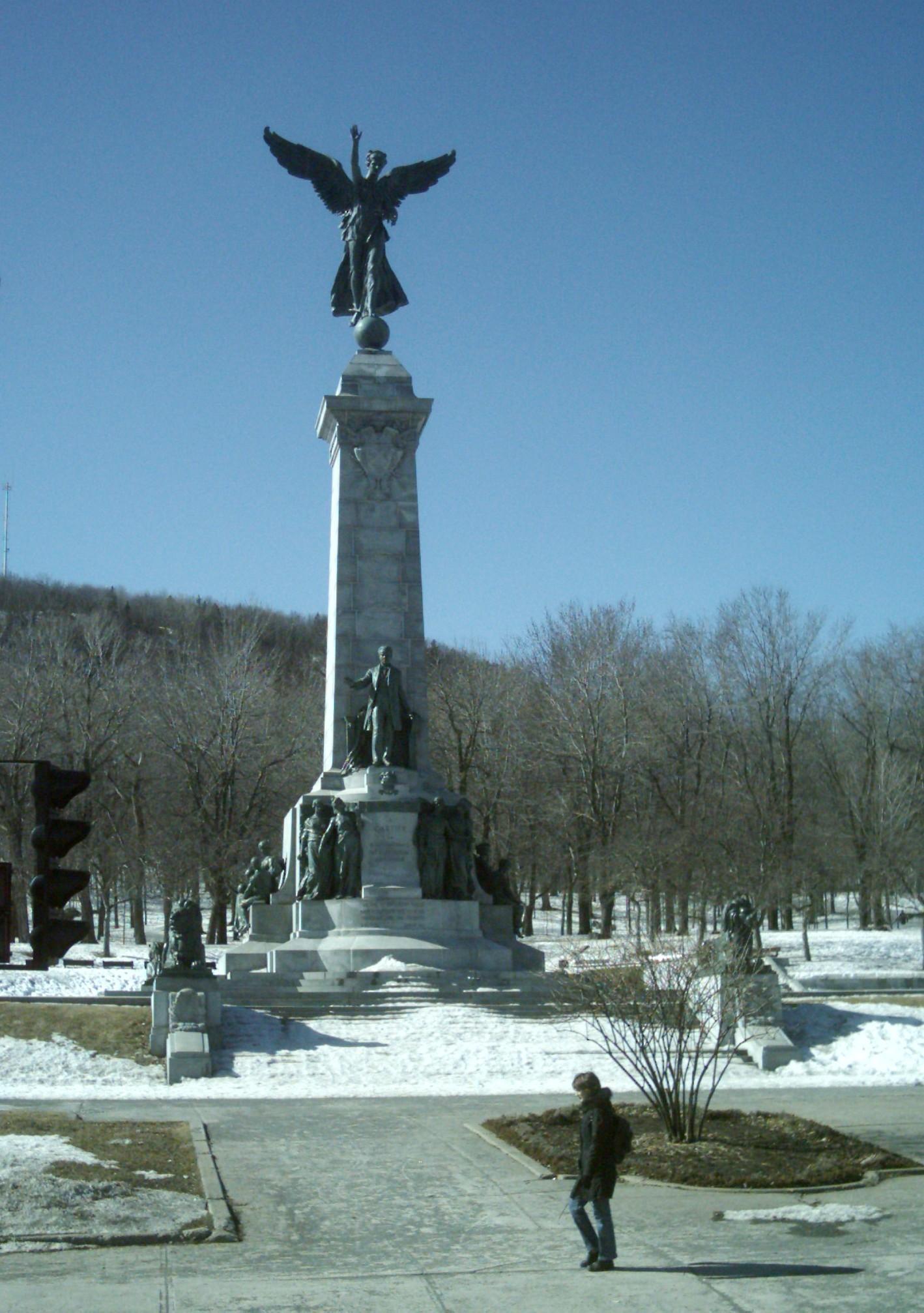
Monument to Sir George-Étienne Cartier in front of Mount Royal during winter in Montreal (1919)

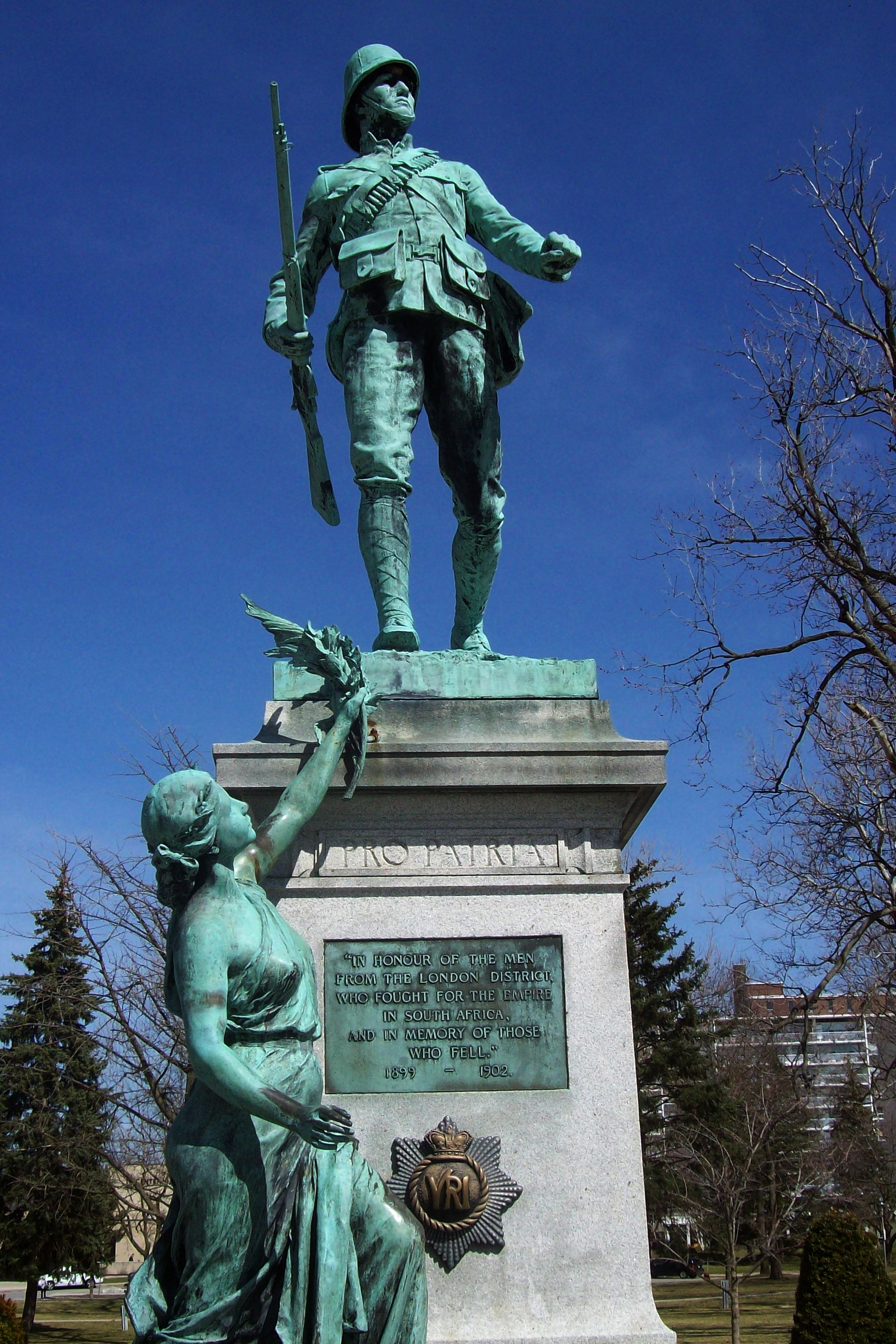
Boer War Monument, George William Hill, Victoria Park, London, Ontario
