= Boer War Memorial (Montreal) =

War memorial in Canada

- Monument aux héros de la guerre des Boers
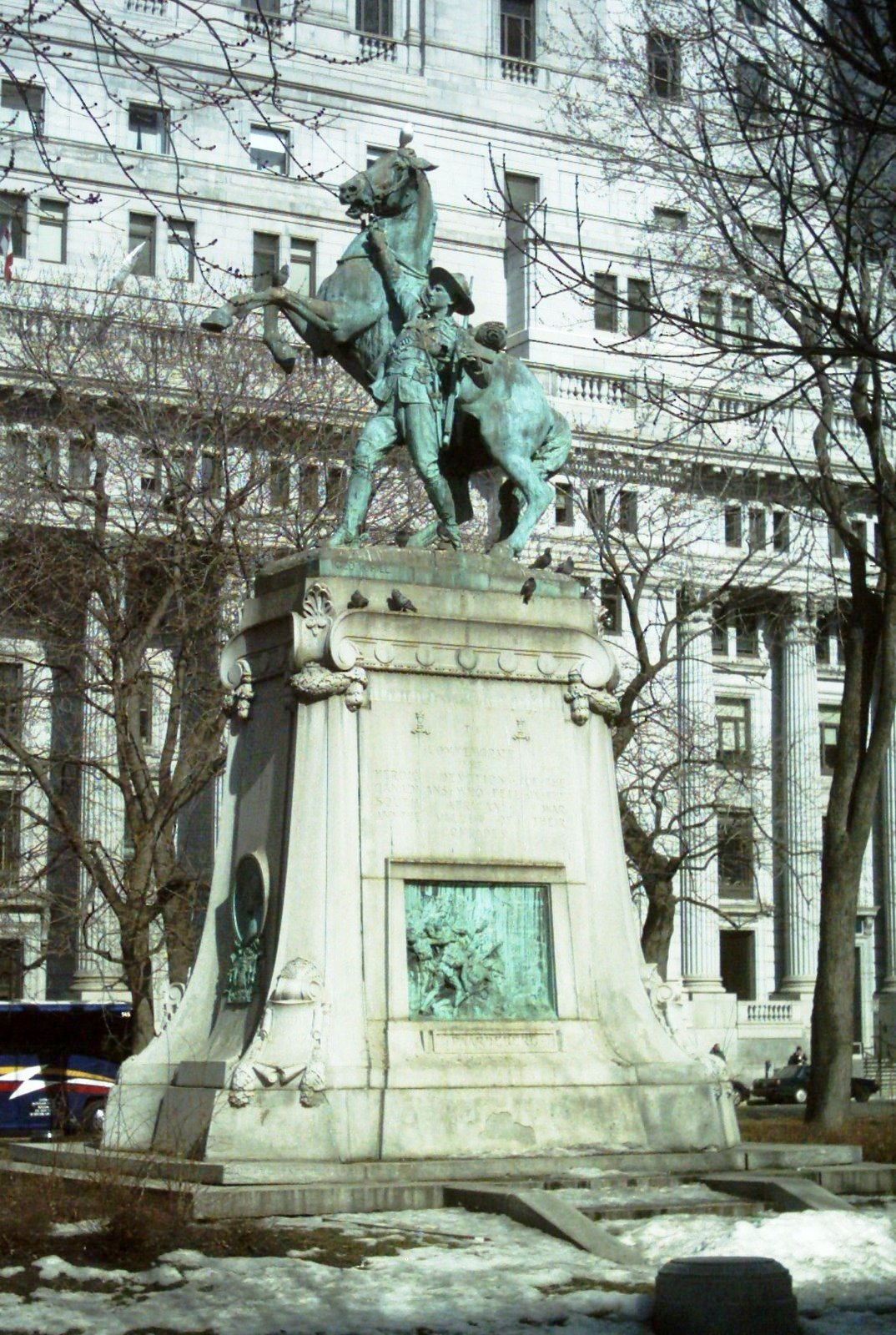
- The monument in 2009
- Interactive map of Boer War Memorial
- Location: Dorchester Square
- Coordinates: 45°29′59″N 73°34′15″W
- Designer: (sculpture) George W. Hill (pedestal) Edward Maxwell and William S. Maxwell
- Material: (sculpture) bronze (pedestal) granite
- Opening date: May 24, 1907
- Dedicated to: Heroes of the Boer War

The Boer War Memorial (French: Monument aux héros de la guerre des Boers) is a monument to the heroes of the Boer War. It is located at Dorchester Square in downtown Montreal, in Quebec, Canada.

== Overview ==
The Boer War Memorial was unveiled in Dominion Square (now known as Dorchester Square) on May 24, 1907. The bronze sculpture was created by George W. Hill (1862–1934). The granite pedestal was designed by Edward Maxwell and William S. Maxwell. Its inscriptions says:

In grateful recognition of the patriotism and public spirit shown by Lord Strathcona and Mount Royal in raising and equipping a regiment of horse for service in South Africa as evidence of his sympathy with the cause of imperial unity.'; and on the opposite side, 'To commemorate the heroic devotion of the Canadians who fell in the South African War and the valour of their comrades.

It is the only equestrian statue in Montreal, and atypically, is not mounted, but restrained. The Boer War Memorial faces north, towards Mount Royal Cross, which would have been visible from the square until 1929. Around the base of the statue are copper reliefs and the names of each battle. Montreal's First World War cenotaph is in Place du Canada to the south.

The Boer War was widely unpopular in Quebec society, viewed as an imperial war. Prime Minister of Canada Wilfrid Laurier opposed the war, but ultimately compromised with the proposal for militia and volunteers en lieu of conscription.

For two decades after the war, Canadians would gather on February 27 (known in Canada as "Paardeberg Day") around memorials to the South African War to say prayers and honour veterans. This continued until the end of the First World War, when Armistice Day (later called Remembrance Day) began to be observed on November 11.

The four principal monuments – the others being the Robert Burns Memorial, Wilfrid Laurier Memorial, and Queen Victoria Diamond Jubilee Fountain – in the square are arranged to form a five equilateral cross with the kiosk towards the Dominion Square Building.

On July 8, 2009, the official first shovelful of dirt was lifted in the $23-million project to restore Dorchester Square and Place du Canada near the Boer War memorial monument.

== See also ==
- South African War Memorial (Halifax)
- South African War Memorial (Toronto)
