= Lady Meredith House =

Historic mansion in Montreal, Quebec

Coordinates: 45.5042°N 73.5819°W

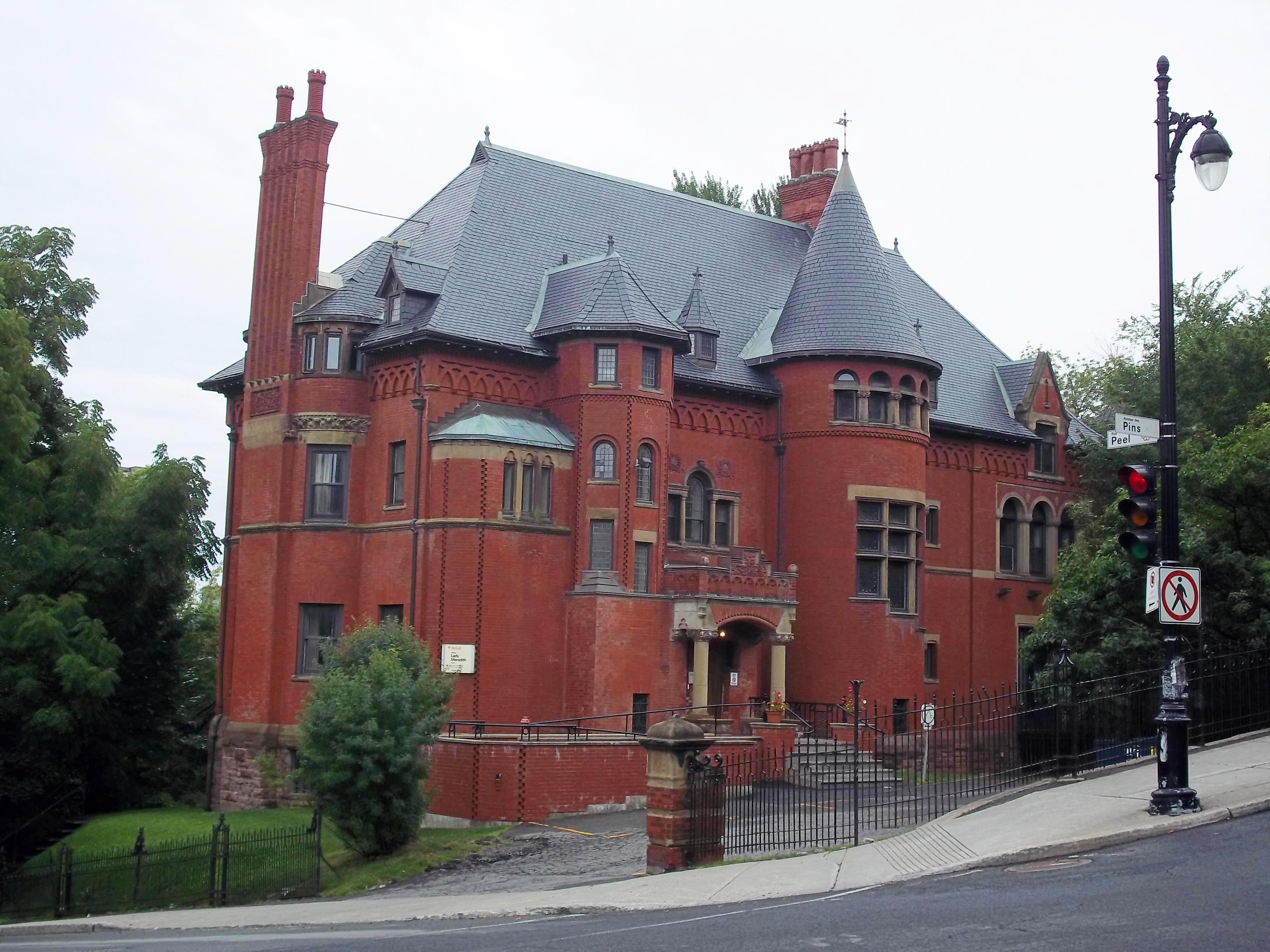
- Interactive map of the Lady Meredith House area
- Former names: Ardvarna
- Alternative names: H. Vincent Meredith Residence

General information
- Type: Mansion (now offices)
- Architectural style: Queen Anne Revival
- Location: Golden Square Mile, 1110 Pine Avenue West; Montreal, Quebec
- Construction started: 1894
- Completed: 1897
- Client: Vincent and Brenda Meredith
- Owner: The Royal Institution for the Advancement of Learning (McGill University)

Technical details
- Floor area: 1,253 m^{2}

Design and construction
- Architect: Edward Maxwell

National Historic Site of Canada
- Official name: H. Vincent Meredith Residence National Historic Site of Canada
- Designated: 1990

Lady Meredith House, also known as the H. Vincent Meredith Residence, is a historic mansion located at 1110 Pine Avenue West on the corner of Peel Street, in what is today known as the Golden Square Mile of Montreal, Quebec. It was originally named Ardvarna and is now owned by McGill University. The building was designated as a National Historic Site of Canada on November 16, 1990. The house is situated at an altitude of 129 m.

== History ==
The land on which the house stands was originally part of the estate of Simon McTavish in the Golden Square Mile. In 1860, his heirs subdivided the land and sold it off in several large plots. The shipowner and financier, Andrew Allan, purchased one these plots just south of the fourteen acre plot purchased by his brother, Sir Hugh Allan, on which Ravenscrag was completed in 1863. Using the same architects as his brother, Andrew Allan built Iononteh, a greystone mansion completed in 1865 that dominated Upper Peel Street, but which has since been demolished.

In 1888, Andrew Allan gave a parcel of his land to his youngest daughter, Isabella Brenda Allan (1867–1959), on the occasion of her marriage to Vincent Meredith, who would become the first Canadian-born president of the Bank of Montreal and in 1916 was created the 1st Baronet of Montreal. Meredith's brother, Charles, lived in the house immediately to the west of his home and their cousin, Frederick Meredith, lived only a few houses further down from them, also on Pine Avenue.

After their marriage, the Merediths lived on Sherbrooke Street in the house next door to the Van Horne Mansion. In 1894, they commissioned the architect Edward Maxwell to build them a house on the land gifted to them by Mrs. Meredith's father on Pine Avenue, at the corner of Upper Peel Street. Their home, which they named Ardvarna, was completed in 1897.

In 1941, Lady Meredith gave the house and its land to the Royal Victoria Hospital for use as a nurses residence. McGill University acquired the house in 1975, although it was shared with the hospital for several years afterward. In 1990, the McGill Centre for Medicine, Ethics, and Law moved into the residence. Following an attempted arson on January 7, 1990, the house was thoroughly renovated by architects Gersovitz, Becker, and Moss.

== Architecture ==
The house is considered to be an example of Queen Anne Revival-style architecture, with some features resembling Richardsonian Romanesque. The garden surrounding the house was designed by landscape architects Olmsted & Eliot. In 1914, a large addition was made to the west of the central tower, again completed by the Maxwell brothers. The property also included a coach house, to the south of the main house, but in the same style and colour. Originally, the grounds included three levels of terraces, rosebeds, perennials, climbing vines and a kitchen garden, which have all now been replaced by a car park, as was the wrought iron gate in the style of Georgian Dublin. The two open-air verandas at the rear of the house, that gave uninterrupted views down over Montreal, the St. Lawrence River and onto the Green Mountains of Vermont, were filled in with windows sometime after 1941. In 1987, the house was described by Francois Remillard in his book Mansions of the Golden Square Mile, Montreal 1850-1930:

This is one of Edward Maxwell's most successful designs. It was constructed in 1894, and designed in Richardsonian Romanesque. However, even a cursory examination of its facade reveals a multitude of architectural influences making it an admirable example of Victorian eclecticism. With its towers, stepped windows and high chimneys Lady Meredith House befits the dramatic landscape of the slopes of Mount Royal. It is faced in brick, sandstone, granite and terra cotta, all red. The brickwork is excellent and in evidence on all four sides of the house. Such elaborate craftsmanship would be well-nigh impossible to replicate in our days.

== Lady Meredith Annex ==
The Coach House, now known as the Lady Meredith Annex, is home to the McGill University's Wellness Office, which offers services to medical students and resident physicians within McGill's Faculty of Medicine.

A portion of this building is rented by the Medical Students Society of McGill University. The space is used to hold club meetings, conferences, courses, as well as other extra-curricular activities.

== Gallery ==
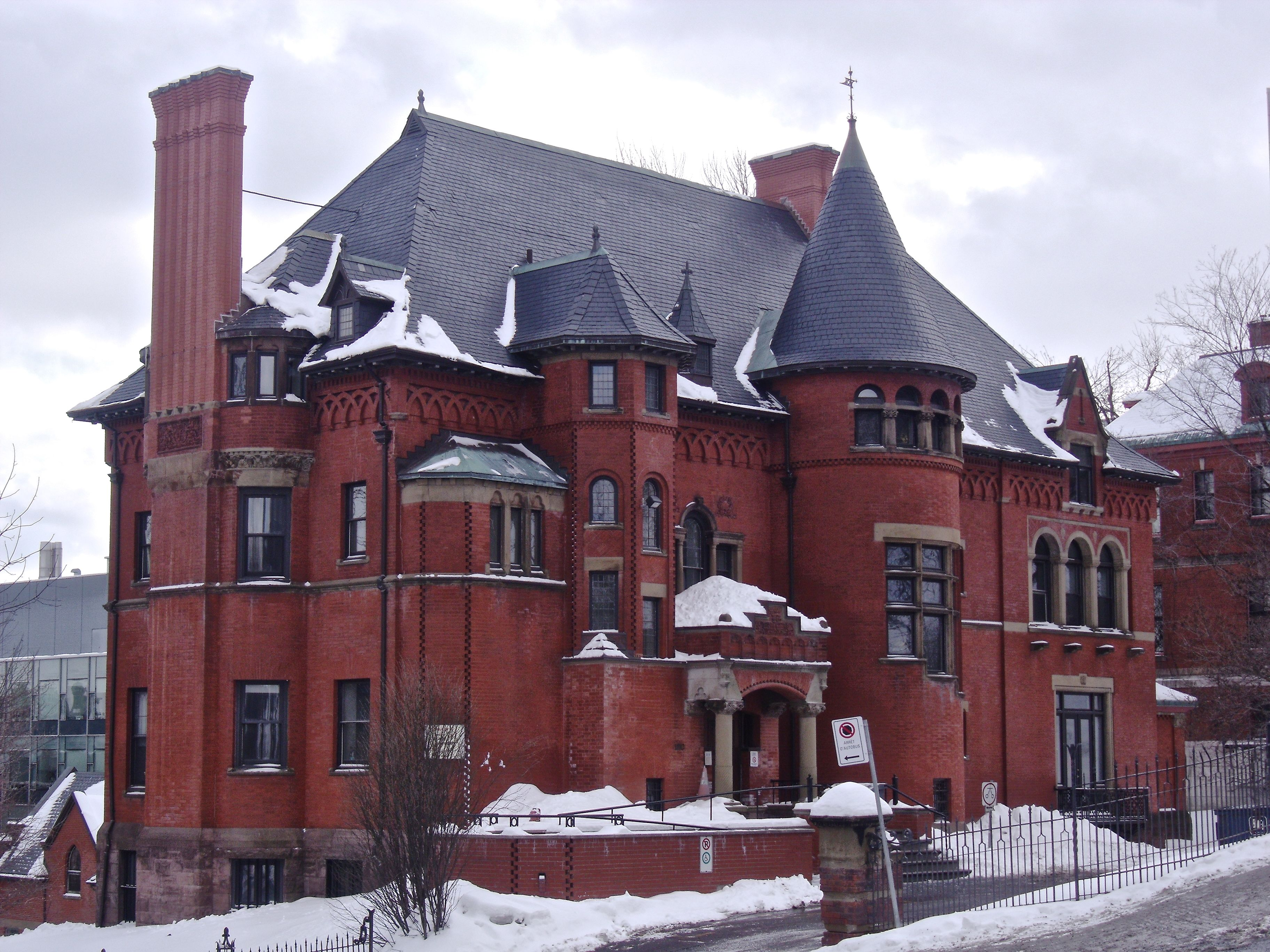
As seen from the perimeter of Ravenscrag

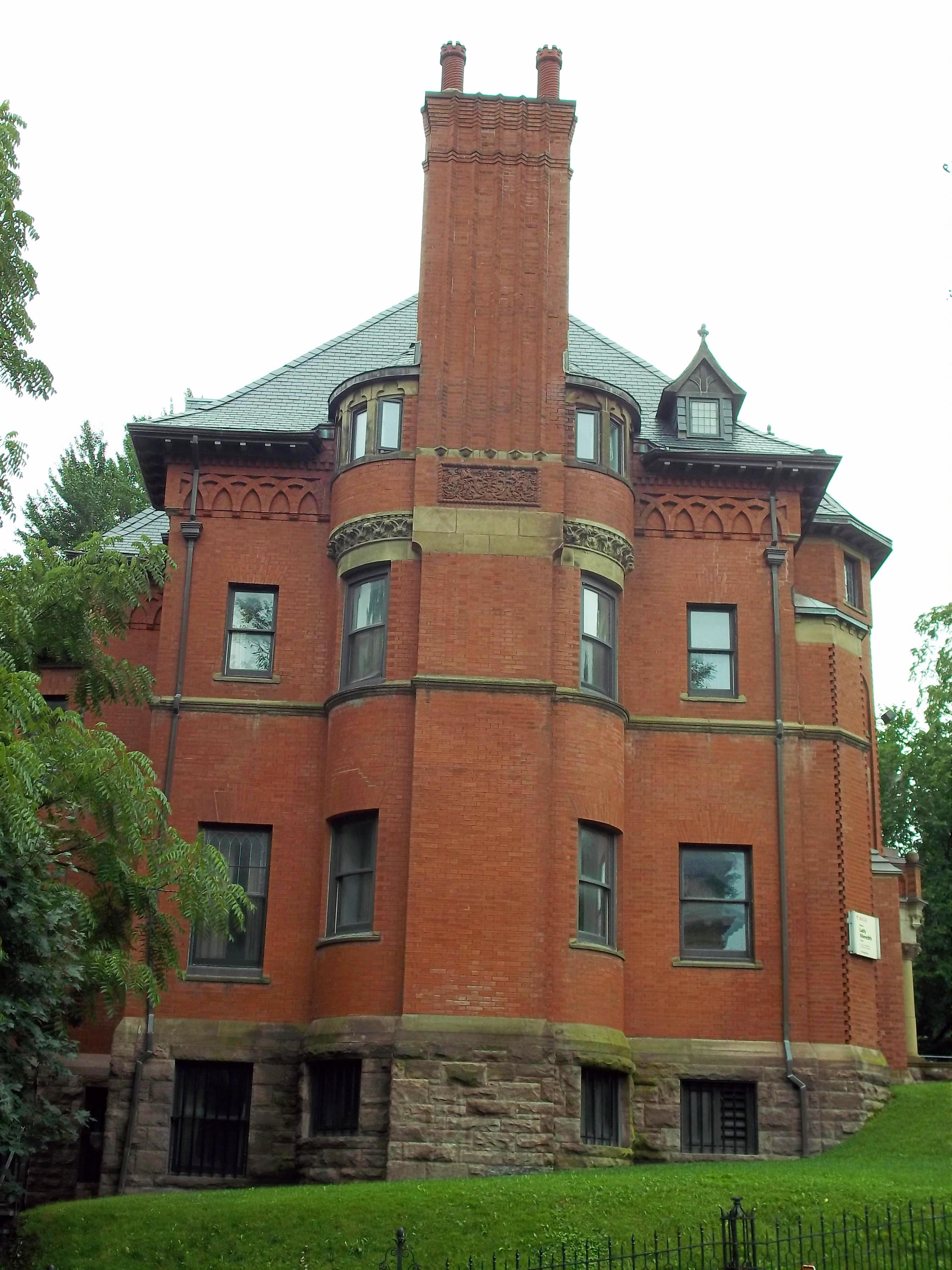
As seen from the top of Peel Street

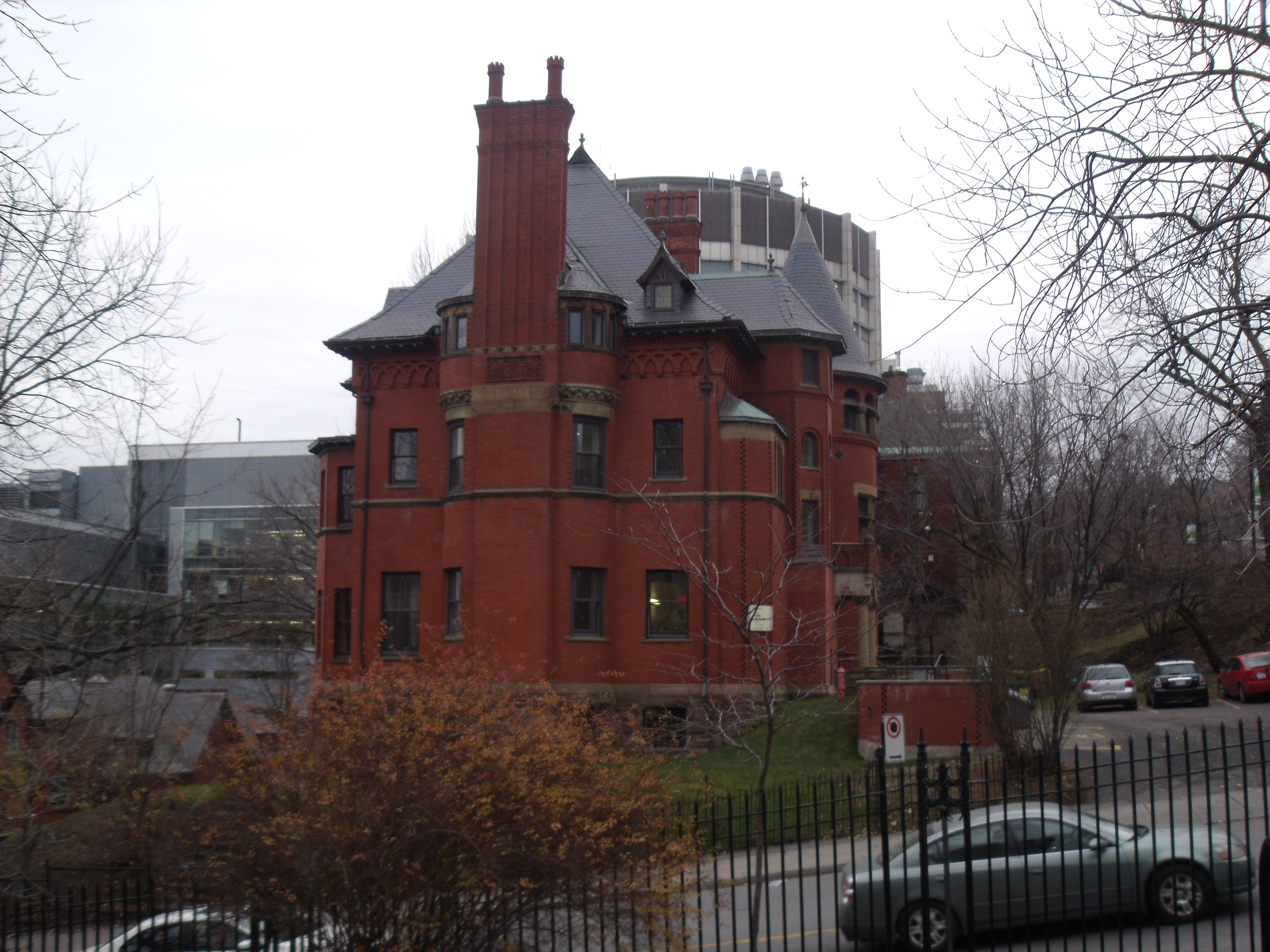
As seen from Purvis Hall

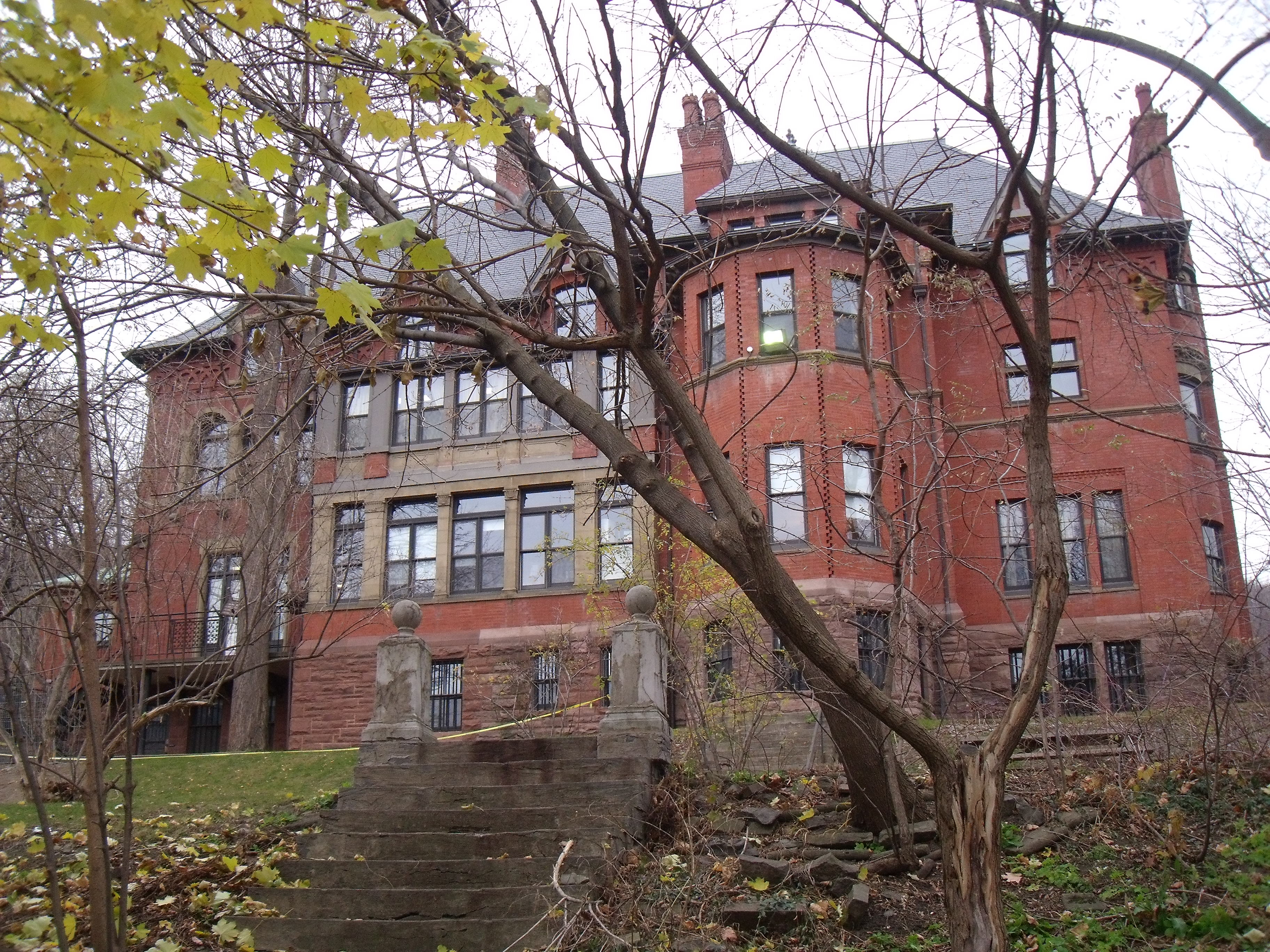
Rear view

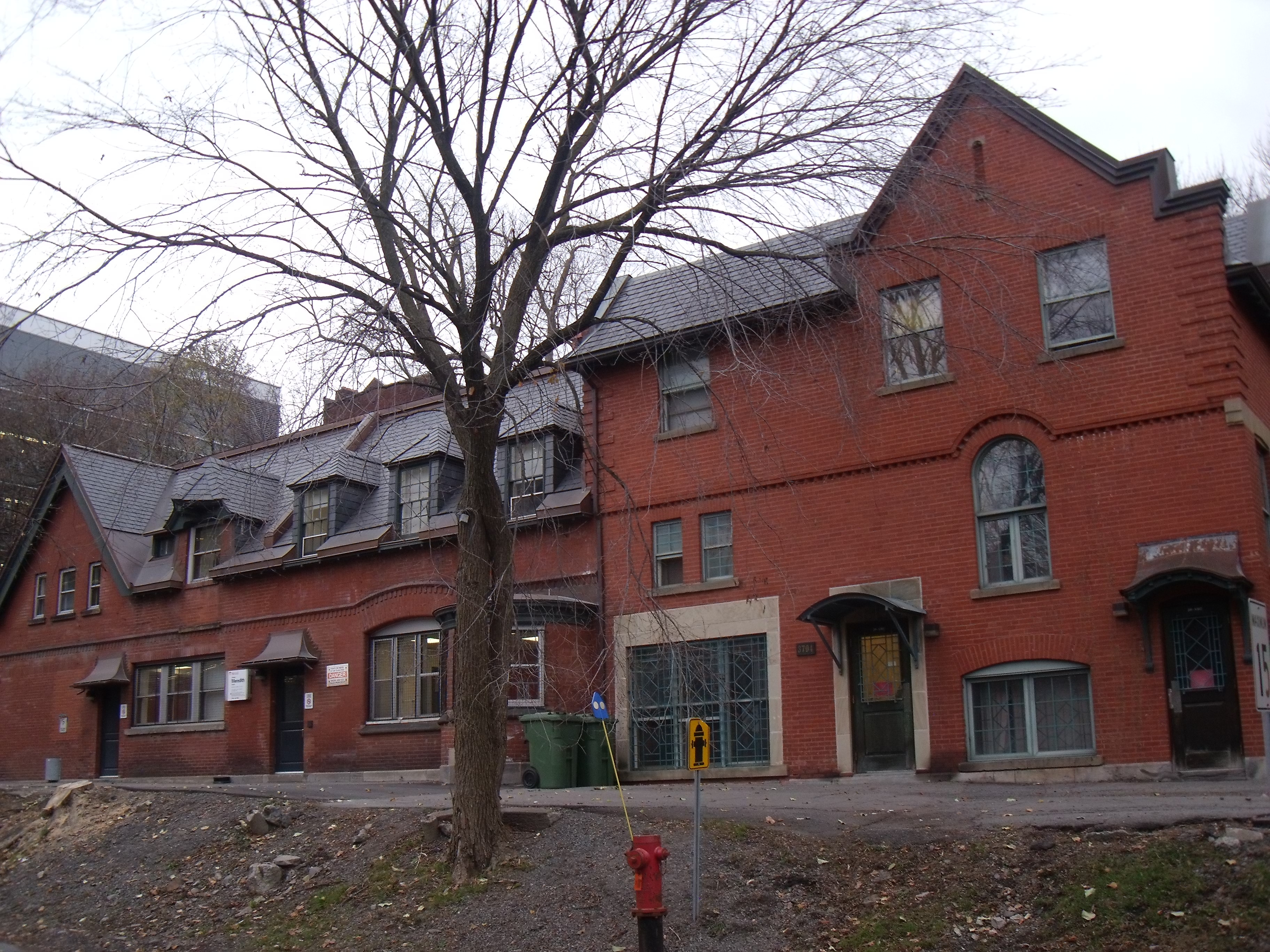
The Coach House (front)

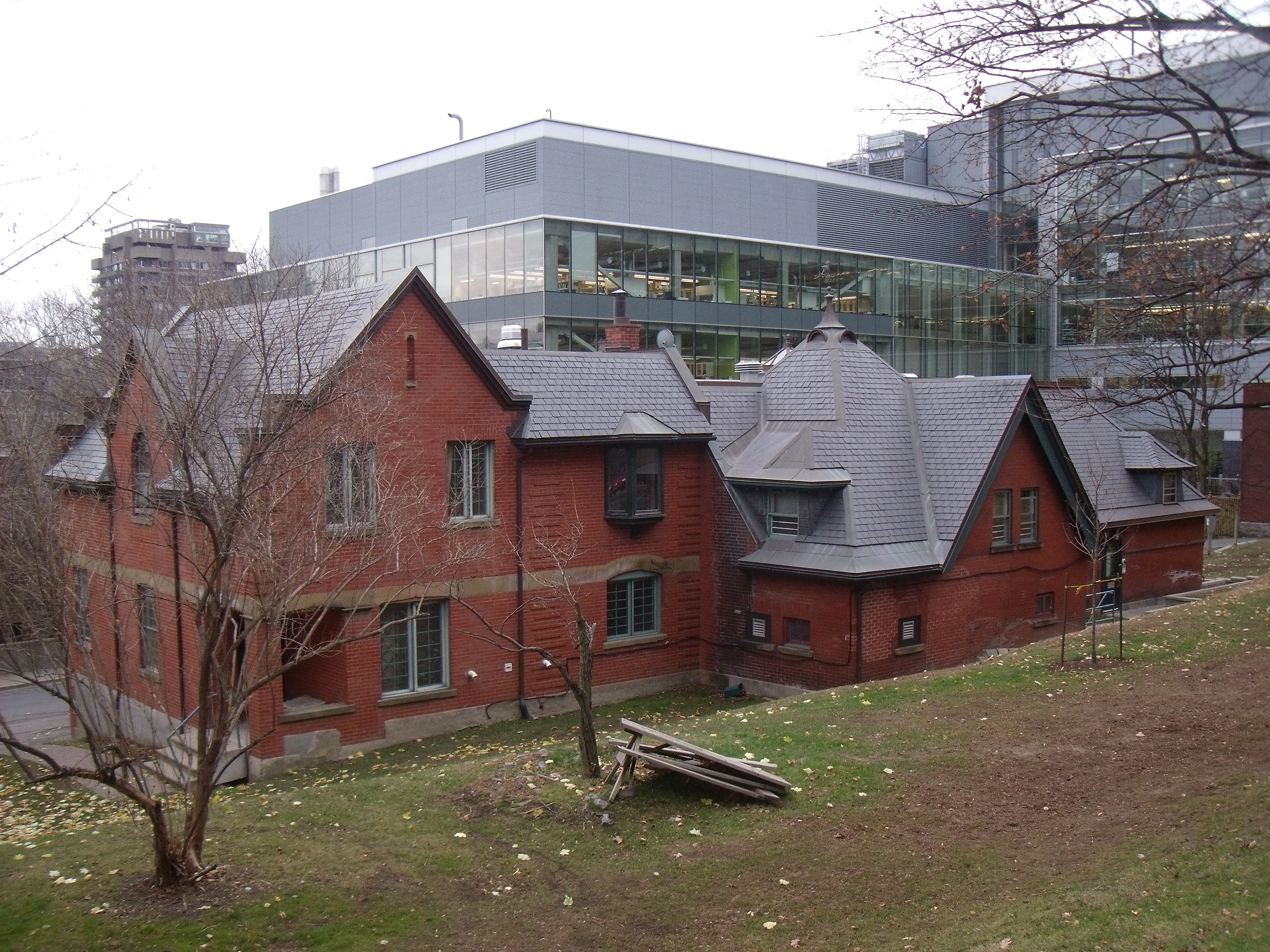
The Coach House (rear)

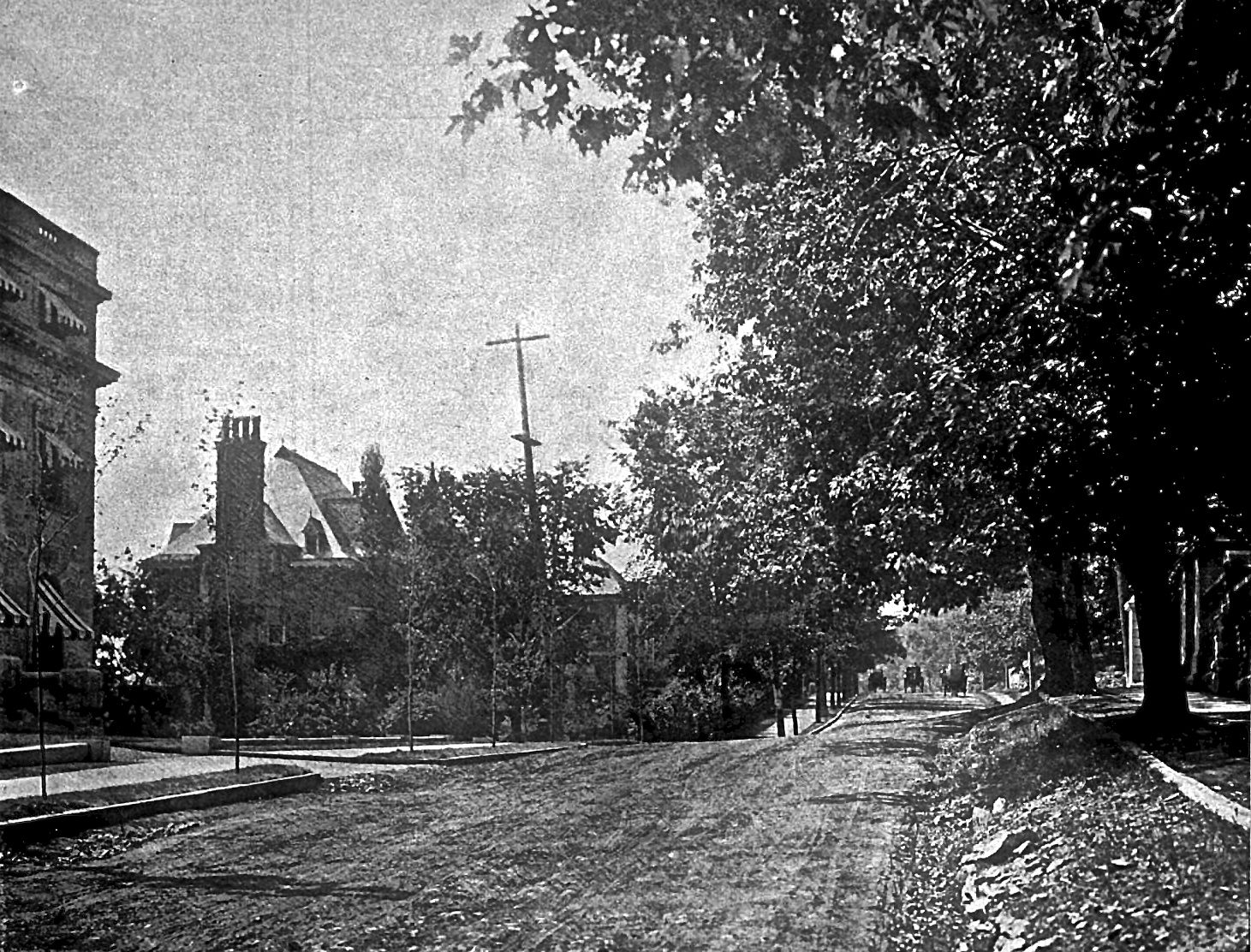
As seen from Pine Avenue in 1909

== See also ==
- Notman House, a historic house in Montreal, built in 1843-45 for Meredith's father's first cousin, Sir William Collis Meredith
- Ravenscrag, another historic mansion in Montreal, built in 1860–63 for Lady Meredith's uncle, Sir Hugh Allan
