= Robert Burns Memorial (Montreal) =

- Monument à Robert Burns
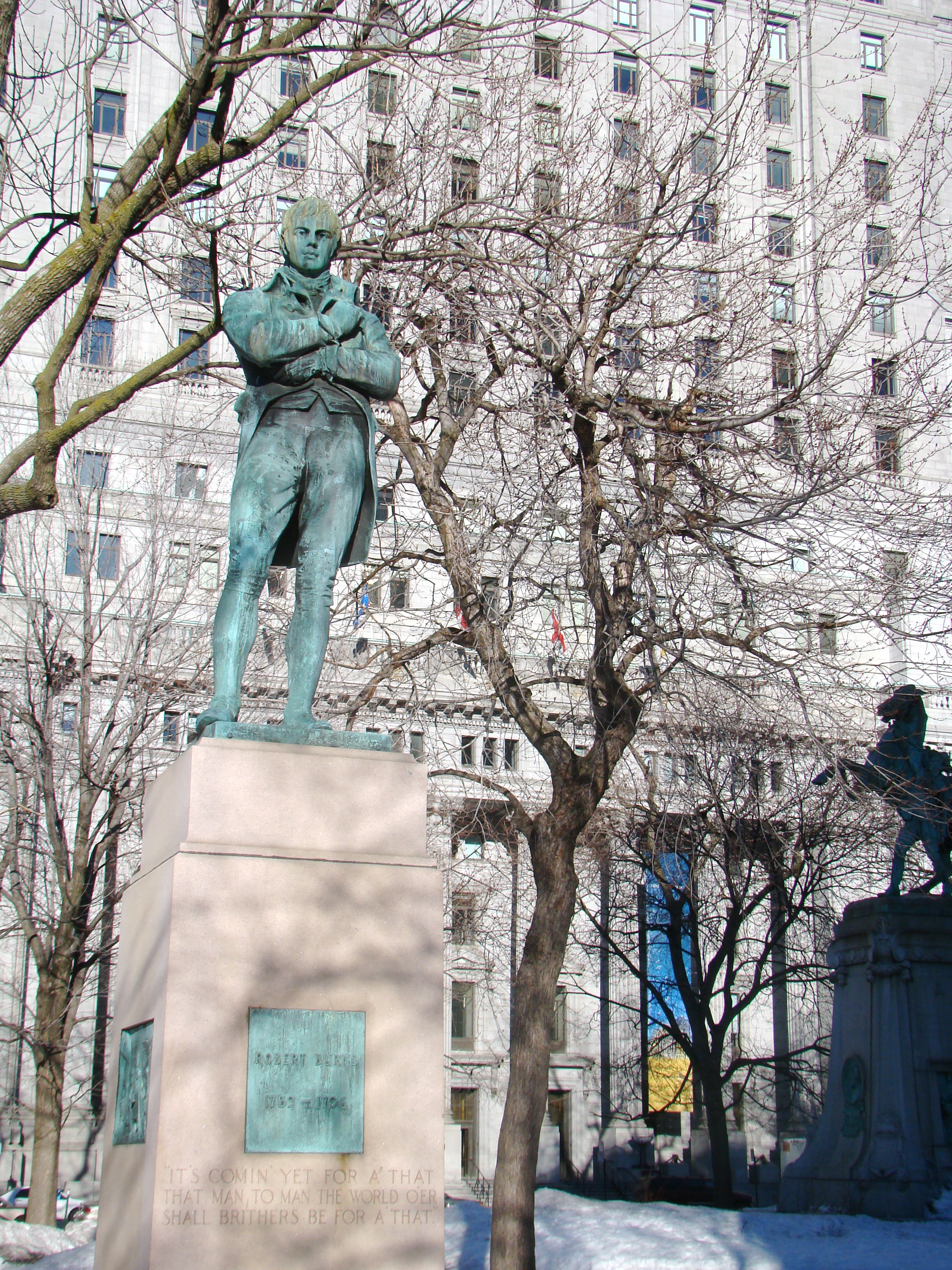
- View from western side of the Square. Tribute to Robert Burns in the foreground, Boer War Memorial in behind and the Sun Life Building in the background
- Interactive map of Robert Burns Memorial
- Location: Dorchester Square
- Coordinates: 45°29′58.3296″N 73°34′17.1084″W
- Designer: George Anderson Lawson
- Material: bronze, pink granite
- Height: 4.95 metres (16.2 ft)
- Opening date: October 18, 1930
- Dedicated to: Robert Burns

The Robert Burns Memorial (French: Monument à Robert Burns), created by sculptor George Anderson Lawson, is a monument located at Dorchester Square in Downtown Montreal.

== Overview ==
The memorial to the Scottish poet Robert Burns, a tribute to Montréal's Scottish industrialists and financiers, represents the socially conscious and refined romantic ideal of the community during the High Victorian Era. The memorial by George Anderson Lawson stands at the western entrance of Square Dorchester. Burns looks out towards the infinite expanse of Western Canada, opened up by the rail and finance managed by the elites of the community.

The statue was a reproduction of the one which stands in Ayr, near Burns’ birthplace, considered to be one of the finest depictions of Scotland's national poet.

The light pink sandstone plinth is beneath a standing Burns in brass, with right foot slightly forward, and the right arm almost crossed above the left across the chest. 'Erected by admirers of Burns'. The front plaque states his name and years of life. Inscribed into the plinth itself are the words, 'It's comin' yet for a' that that man to man the world o'er shall brithers be for a' that'. The base is inscribed 'Erected by admirers of Burns'. The plinth followed clockwise displays reliefs of scenes from his poems, Tam O'Shanter (1790), To a mountain daisy (1786), and The cotter's Friday night (1785).

The memorial was unveiled in the city’s downtown Dominion Square on October 18, 1930, a cold and rainy day. The speeches made that day emphasised that its erection was not only in honour of Burns's genius, but also to commemorate the impact of Scots on Montreal’s development.

On July 8, 2009, the official first shovelful of dirt was lifted in the $23-million project to restore Dorchester Square and Place du Canada at 10 a.m. near the Boer War Memorial monument.

The original memorial by George Anderson Lawson was inaugurated in Ayr, in 1892. Replicas of Lawson's memorial were also erected in Melbourne on 23 January 1904, Halifax, Nova Scotia in 1919, Detroit on 23 July 1921, Vancouver on 25 August 1928, and Winnipeg in 1936.

== See also ==
- List of Robert Burns memorials
