= London and Lancashire Life Building =

Building in Montreal, Canada

Coordinates: 45.5033°N 73.5586°W

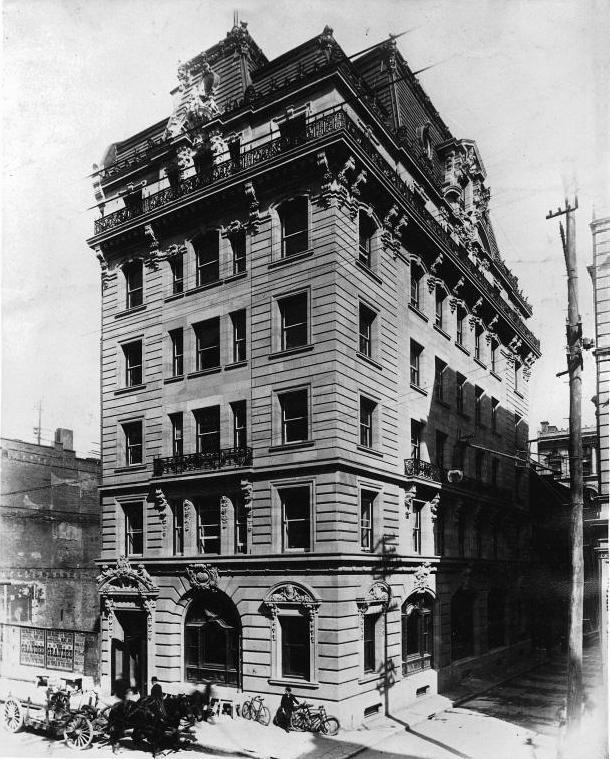
London & Lancashire Insurance Building, Place d'Armes, Montreal

The London and Lancashire Life Building was built in 1898 by the architect Edward Maxwell for the London and Lancashire Life Association of Scotland. The Beaux-Arts structure was later used as the head office for Lord Beaverbrook, the New Brunswick-born magnate and later Minister of Supply under Prime Minister Sir Winston Churchill.
