= Edward Maxwell =

Canadian architect

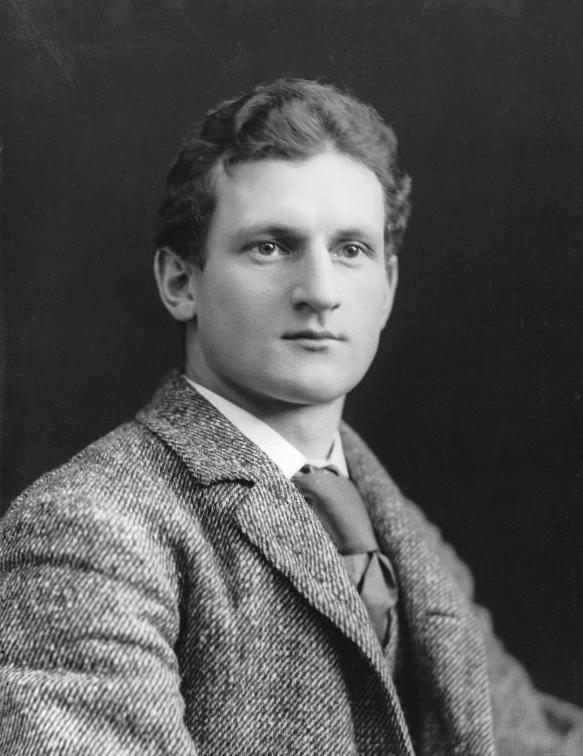
Edward Maxwell in 1893

Edward Maxwell (31 December 1867 – 14 November 1923) was a prominent Canadian architect.

== Life and career ==
The son of Edward John Maxwell, a lumber dealer in Montreal, by his marriage to Johanna MacBean, Maxwell graduated from the High School of Montreal at the age of fourteen and was apprenticed to the firm of Shepley, Rutan and Coolidge in Boston. In 1891, the firm was instructed to design a new building for the Montreal Board of Trade. Maxwell returned home to Montreal to supervise its construction, helped by having good relations with influential members of the Board.

In 1892, the jeweller Henry Birks hired Maxwell to design a new store in Montreal's Phillips Square. Maxwell also designed several stations and hotels for the Canadian Pacific Railway, including the West Vancouver station (1897) and the McAdam station (1900). In 1899, he designed a country house for Louis-Joseph Forget at Senneville, Quebec, a good example of his domestic work.

In 1902, he went into partnership with his younger brother, William Sutherland Maxwell, who had studied at the École des beaux-arts in Paris. In 1903, he was elected to the Royal Canadian Academy of Arts.

== Selected buildings ==
- Lady Meredith House at 1110 Pine Avenue West, Montreal (1894)
- Royal St. Lawrence Yacht Club – clubhouse (1895)
- London and Lancashire Life Building, Montreal (1898)
- Vancouver CPR depot (1898–1914)
- McAdam station (1900)
- Charles Meredith House at 1130 Pine Avenue West, Montreal (1904)
- Montreal Museum of Fine Arts (1910)
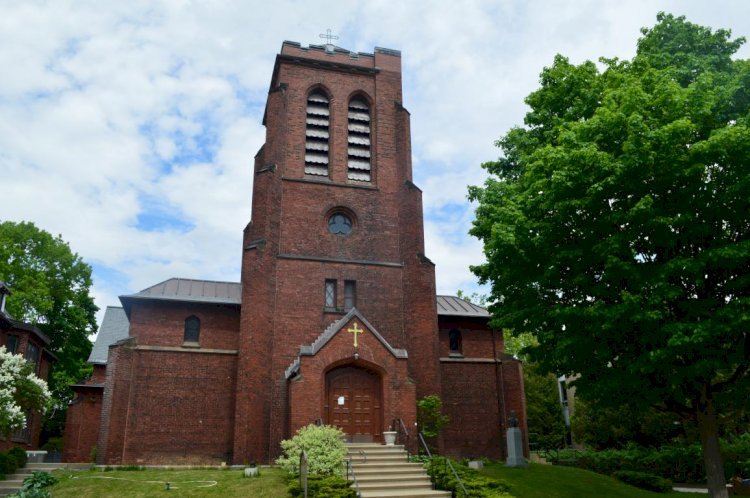
Holy Trinity Serbian Orthodox Church in Montreal, formerly Melville Presbyterian Church (1897-1900)

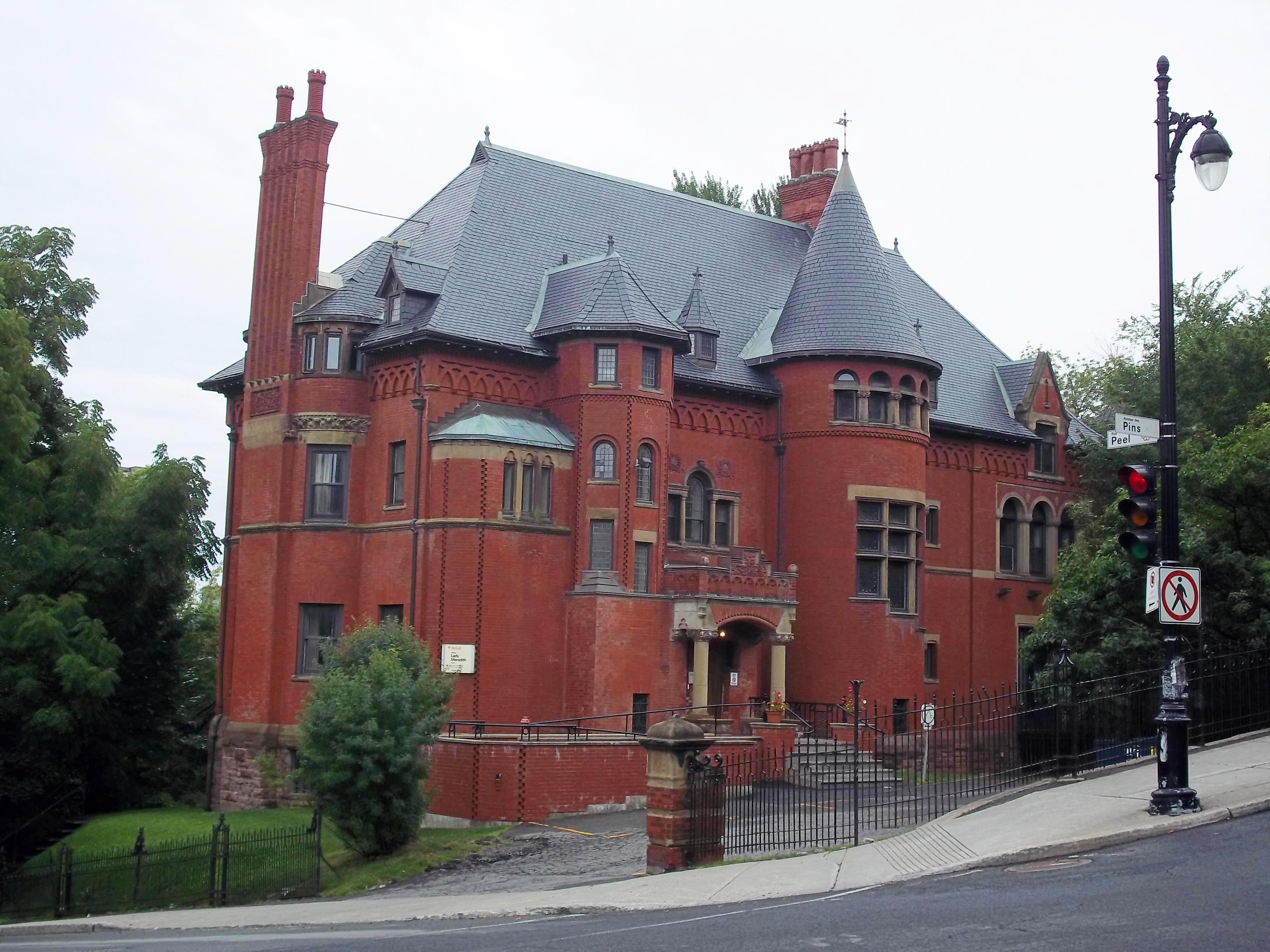
Lady Meredith House (1894)

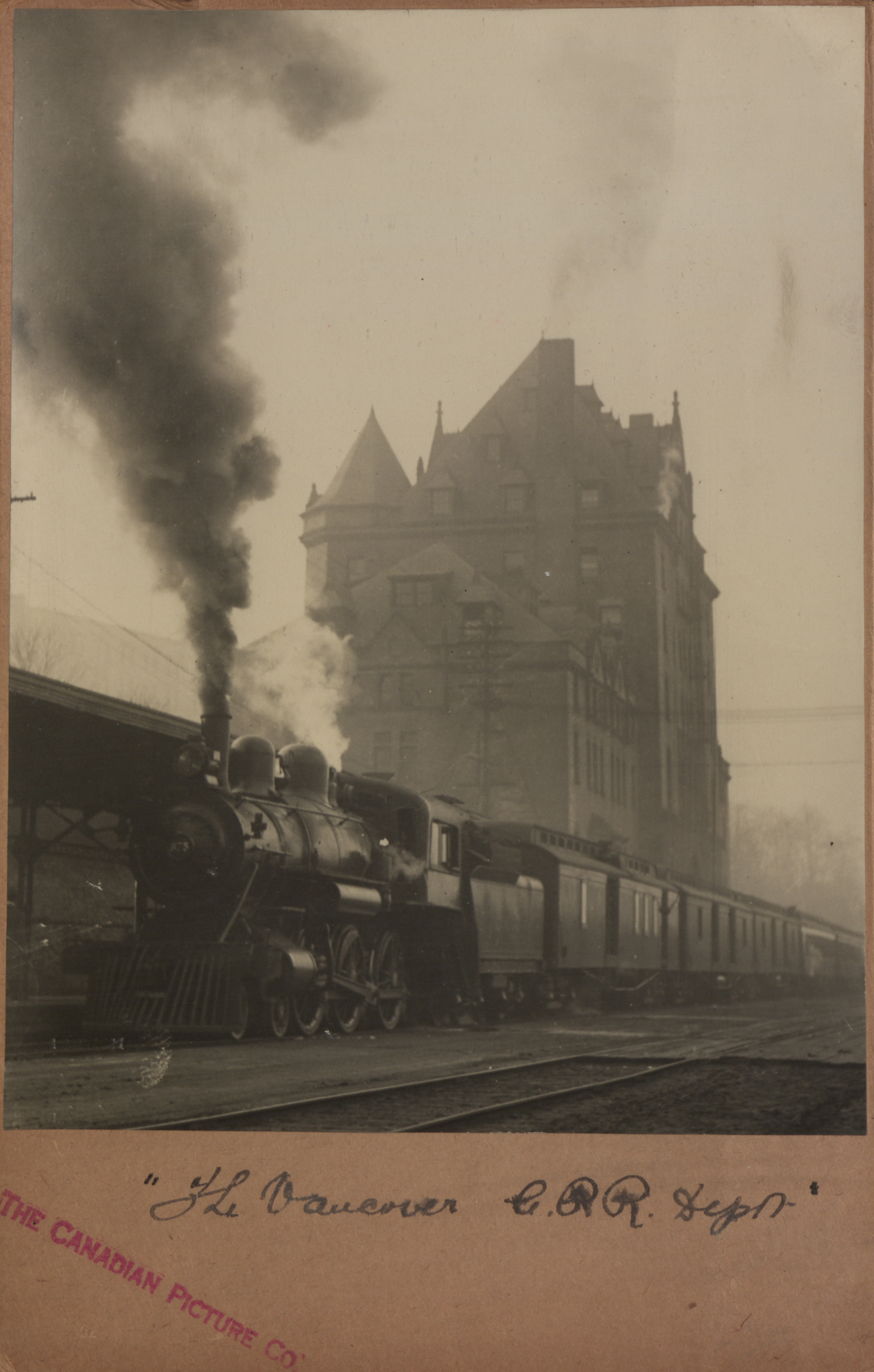
Vancouver CPR depot (1898–1914)

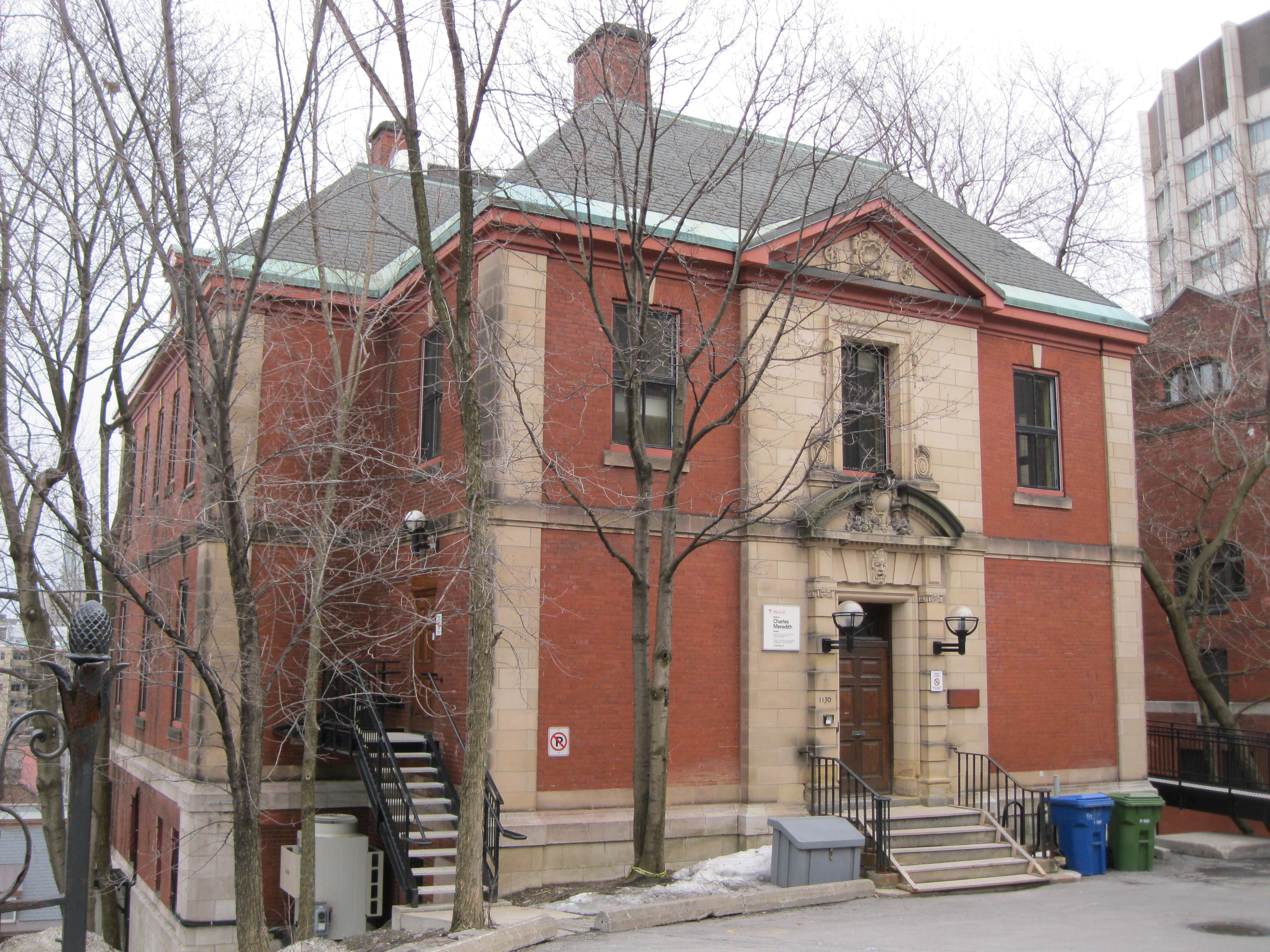
Charles Meredith House (1904)
