= Plug-in electric vehicles in Canada =

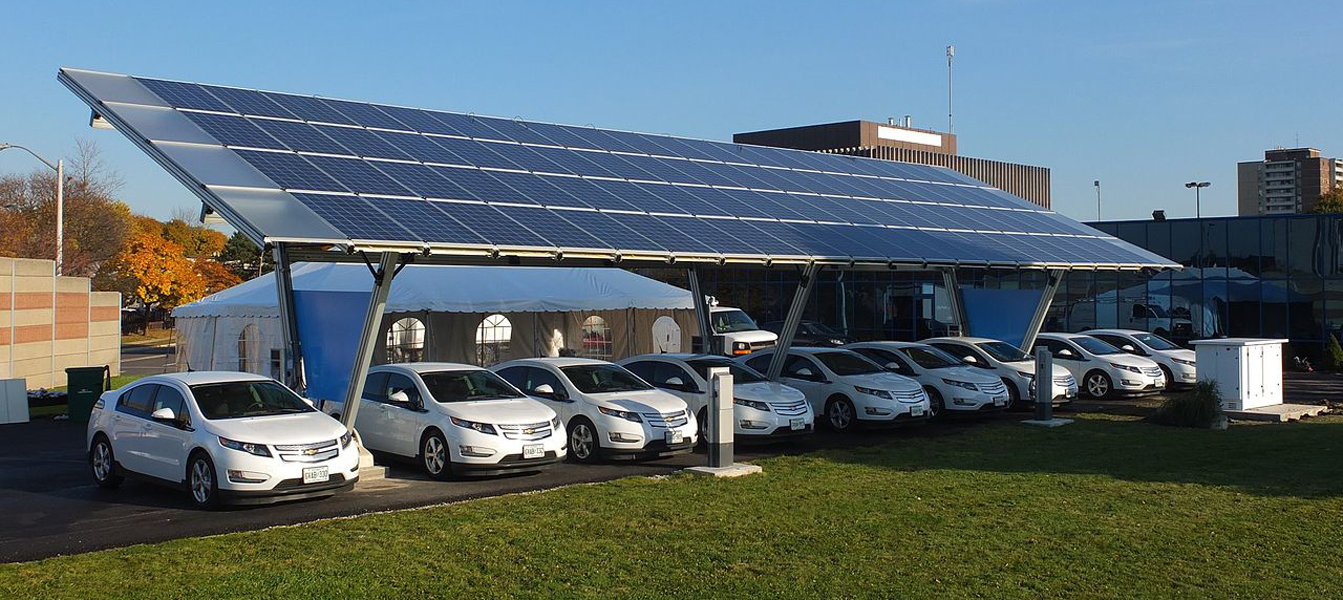
The Chevrolet Volt is the all-time top selling plug-in electric car in Canada. Shown here is a fleet of Volts at a solar-powered charging station in Toronto.

The stock of plug-in electric passenger cars in Canada in use totaled 901,545 units as of April 2025, consisting of 644,679 all-electric cars and 256,866 plug-in hybrids. This represents 3.4% of all light-duty vehicles in Canada. Sales had a 15.3% market share in 2024 (11.4% for all-electric cars and 3.9% for plug-in hybrids), but are expected to decrease in 2025.

The Chevrolet Volt was the top selling plug-in hybrid, with cumulative sales of 13,619 units through December 2017, and the Tesla Model S was the top selling all-electric car with 6,731 units as of December 2017.

Quebec is the regional market leader in Canada, with about 11,000 plug-in electric cars registered as of September 2016, of which, 55% are plug-in hybrids. Registrations in the province totaled 3,100 units in 2015, representing a market share of 0.7% of new car sales, and 45% of total Canadian plug-in electric car sales that year.

On December 21, 2022, Steven Guilbeault, Canada's minister of environment and climate change, unveiled a regulation that would require increasing percentages of vehicle sales in Canada to be zero-emission vehicles, up to 100% by the year 2035. The regulations will require that at least 20 percent of new vehicles sold in Canada will be zero emission by 2026, at least 60 percent by 2030, and 100 percent by 2035. The EV mandate was paused to undergo a review in September 2025.

== Overview by province or territory ==
Articles about plug-in electric vehicles in individual provinces and territories:

- Alberta
- British Columbia
- Manitoba
- New Brunswick
- Newfoundland and Labrador
- Northwest Territories
- Nova Scotia
- Ontario
- Prince Edward Island
- Quebec
- Saskatchewan
- Yukon

== Government incentives ==
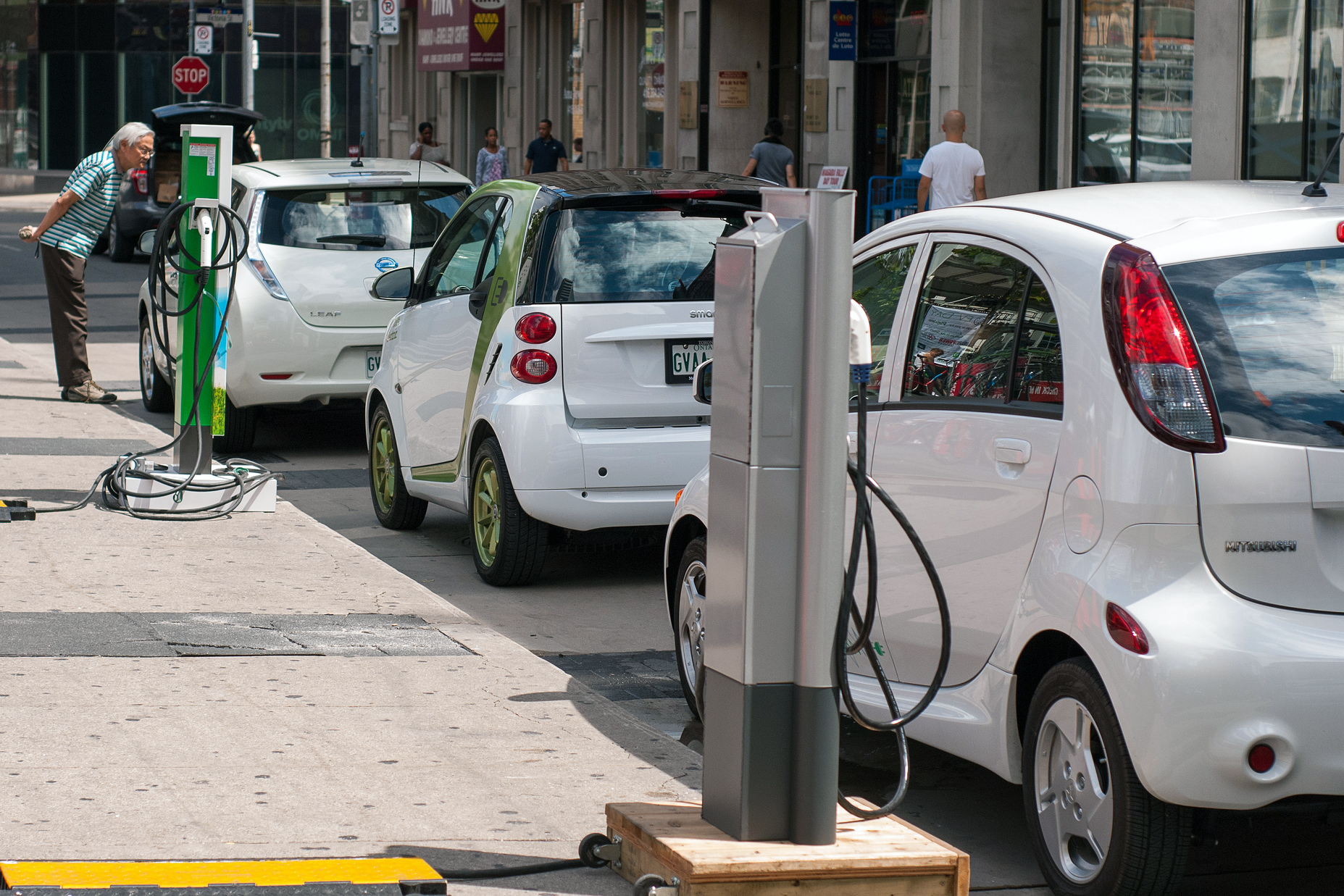
Several electric cars charging in downtown Toronto. From farthest to closest, a Nissan Leaf, a Smart ED, and a Mitsubishi i MiEV.

The Canadian government provided a rebate of C$5000 to the purchase of an electric vehicle from 2019 to 2025. The program exhausted its funding and was paused in 2025.

== Models available ==
In January 2009, Hydro-Québec and Mitsubishi signed an agreement to test 50 i-MiEV, at the time, the largest pilot test of electric cars in Canada ever. The test's goal was to allow a better understanding of winter usage of the technology. BC-Hydro and Mitsubishi had previously tested a three-vehicle fleet in British Columbia. In October 2010, Transport Canada and Mitsubishi Motor Sales of Canada announced a partnership to test the Mitsubishi i-MiEV. Transport Canada's ecoTECHNOLOGY for Vehicles (eTV) Program tested two i-MiEVs in government facilities and in a variety of real-world conditions. This program aim was to evaluate the i-MiEV road performance and range. Retail sales of the i-MiEV began in December 2011,

The Nissan Leaf roll-out in Canada began with fleet customers on July 29, 2011, and deliveries to individuals began in late September 2011. As of December 2011, the Leaf was sold only through 27 Leaf-certified dealers for the entire country, and sales were limited to customers who live within a 65 km (40 mi) radius of one of those dealers. Cumulative sales through December 2014 reached 1,965 units, and, as of December 2014, the Leaf ranked as the top selling all-electric car in the country.

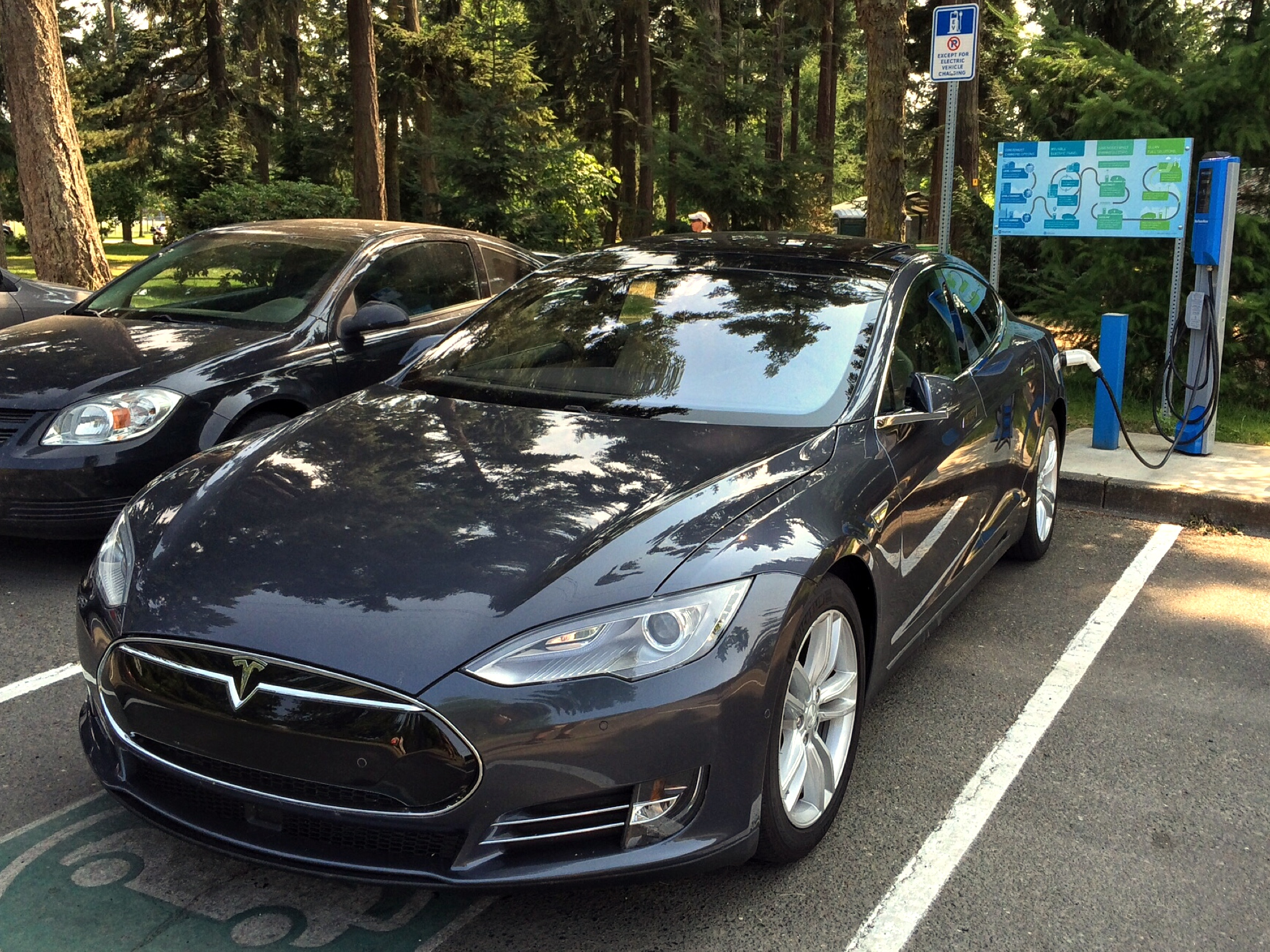
The Tesla Model S is the all-time top selling pure electric car in Canada. Shown charging in Parksville, British Columbia.

Retail sales of the Tesla Model S began in 2012, with 95 cars delivered that year. A total of 638 units were sold in 2013, and cumulative sales reached 1,580 units through December 2014, allowing the Model S to rank as the second best selling all-electric car in the country. During 2014 the BMW i3, Kia Soul EV, BMW i8 and Porsche 918 Spyder were introduced in the Canadian market. The top selling models in 2015 were the Tesla Model S with 2,010 units, followed by the Chevrolet Volt with 1,463, the Nissan Leaf with 1,233, the BMW i3 with 367, and the Kia Soul EV with 318. In 2015, the Model S passed the Nissan Leaf as the all-time best selling all-electric car in Canada.

The all-electric Renault Twizy 40 low-speed quadricycle was certified by Transport Canada in March 2016, and was scheduled to be released on the Canadian market by mid-2016.

British Columbia is the only place in the country where it is legal to drive a low-speed vehicle (LSV) electric car on public roads, although it also requires low speed warning marking and flashing lights. Quebec is allowing LSVs in a three-year pilot project. These cars will not be allowed on the highway, but will be allowed on city streets.

== Sales ==
There were 18,451 highway legal plug-in electric cars registered in Canada as of December 2015, of which, 10,034 (54%) are all-electric cars and 8,417 (46%) are plug-in hybrids. These figures include some used imports from the U.S. Until 2014 Canadian sales were evenly split between all-electric cars (50.8)% and plug-in hybrids (49.2%).

The Chevrolet Volt, released in 2011, is the all-time top selling plug-in electric vehicle in the country, with cumulative sales of 6,387 units through May 2015 (representing over 30% of all plug-in cars sold in the country). Ranking second is the Tesla Model S with 4,160 units sold through April 2016, followed by the Nissan Leaf with 3,692 units delivered as of May 2016. The Model S was the top selling plug-in electric car in Canada in 2015 with 2,010 units sold.

A total of 1,969 plug-in cars were sold in 2012, up from 521 in 2011. Sales climbed 57.7% in 2013 to 3,106 units, and in 2014 were up 63.0% from 2013 to 5,062 units, reaching cumulative sales of 10,658 plug-in cars through December 2014. The market share of the plug-in electric car segment grew from 0.03% in 2011, to 0.12% in 2012, and reached 0.27% of new car sales in the country in 2014. Cumulative sales reached the 30,000 unit mark in January 2017.

The following table presents new car sales by year of all the highway-capable plug-in electric cars available in Canada between 2011 and December 2015.

Highway-capable plug-in electric new car sales by model in Canada between 2011 and December 2015
Model	Total 2011-2015	2015	2014	2013	2012	2011
Chevrolet Volt	5,415	1,463	1,521	931	1,225	275
Tesla Model S	3,590	2,010	847	638	95	
Nissan Leaf	3,198	1,233	1,085	470	240	170
Smart electric drive	1,132	306	561	222	28	15
Mitsubishi i MiEV	617	121	109	168	196	23
Ford C-Max Energi	609	138	272	199		
BMW i3	566	367	199			
Ford Fusion Energi	429	144	169	116		
Toyota Prius Plug-in Hybrid	394	43	76	212	63	
Kia Soul EV	357	318	39			
Ford Focus Electric	244	42	44	103	55	
BMW i8	228	200	28			
Porsche Cayenne S E-Hybrid	213	213				
Fisker Karma	100		7	26	67	
Cadillac ELR	73	25	44	4		
Chevrolet Spark EV	66	35	26	5		
Porsche Panamera S E-Hybrid	65	20	45			
Tesla Roadster	53					53
Porsche 918 Spyder	28	21	7			
Audi A3 Sportback e-tron	24	24				
McLaren P1	9	6	3			
BMW X5 xDrive40e	5	5				
Toyota RAV4 EV	4	1		3		
Total new plug-in car sales	17,995	6,990	5,322	3,178	1,969	536
PEV market share of new car sales		0.37%	0.29%	0.18%	0.12%	0.03%
Note: New car sales seldom correspond to registrations figures, as some plug-in model registered are used imports from the U.S. and some model numbers may declined as more cars are being taken off the road than are being sold.

== See also ==
- Electric car
- Electric car use by country
- Government incentives for plug-in electric vehicles
- List of modern production plug-in electric vehicles
- Plug-in electric vehicle
- Renewable energy in Canada
