= Transportation in Montreal =

Montreal has a developed transport infrastructure network, which includes well-developed air, road, rail, and maritime links to the rest of Canada, as well as the United States and the rest of the world. Local public transport includes a metro system, buses, ferry services and cycling infrastructure.

Montreal is one of the transportation hubs for eastern Canada and most of Quebec. The city has two international airports, Dorval Airport for passenger flights and Mirabel for cargo. Rail transportation includes intercity trains operated from Montreal Central Station to Quebec City, Ottawa, Toronto and New York City as well as commuter trains. Public transit in Greater Montreal is operated by several public transit providers. Montreal is subject traffic congestion, particularly the Island of Montreal which is a hub for the Autoroutes of Quebec. Montreal is known for being one of the most bicycle-friendly cities in the world, with an extensive bikeway network and cycling mobility.

== Air ==
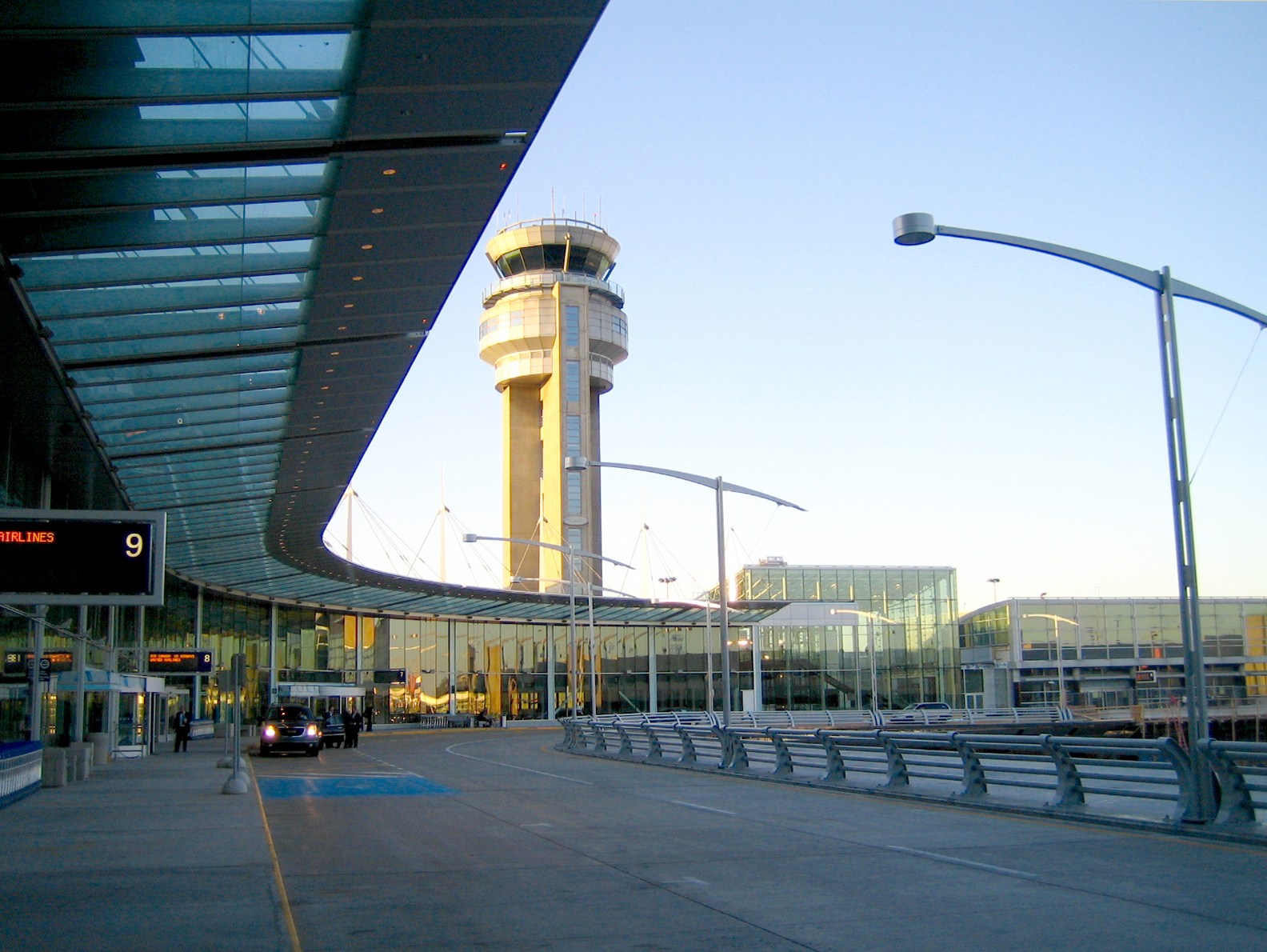
Montréal-Pierre Elliott Trudeau International Airport

Montreal has two international airports, one for passenger flights only, and the other for cargo. Montréal-Pierre Elliott Trudeau International Airport (also known as Dorval Airport) in the City of Dorval serves all commercial passenger traffic and is the headquarters for Air Canada and Air Transat. To the north of the city is Montréal-Mirabel International Airport in Mirabel, which was envisioned as Montreal's primary airport but which now serves cargo flights along with MEDEVACs and general aviation, as well as some passenger services. In 2016, Montreal-Trudeau was the third busiest airport in Canada by both passenger traffic and by aircraft movements, behind Toronto Pearson and Vancouver. In 2016, the airport handled 15.6 million passengers and 225,203 aircraft movements. With 61% of its passengers being on non-domestic flights, it has the largest percentage of international flights of any Canadian airport. Trudeau Airport is served by 40 carriers to over 100 destinations worldwide. Airlines servicing Trudeau offer flights to Africa, Asia, Central America, the Caribbean, Europe, the United States, Mexico and other destinations within Canada. Trudeau Airport is home to the largest duty-free shop in North America.

Other airports in the Montreal area serve military and civilian use. Plattsburgh International Airport in the United States—closer to Montreal's southern suburbs than Trudeau—also serves the area.

Public transportation to Montréal-Pierre Elliott Trudeau International Airport is provided by the Société de transport de Montréal's bus line 747. A branch of the light metro Réseau express métropolitain (REM) will connect to the airport upon completion, intended for 2027.

== Rail transportation ==
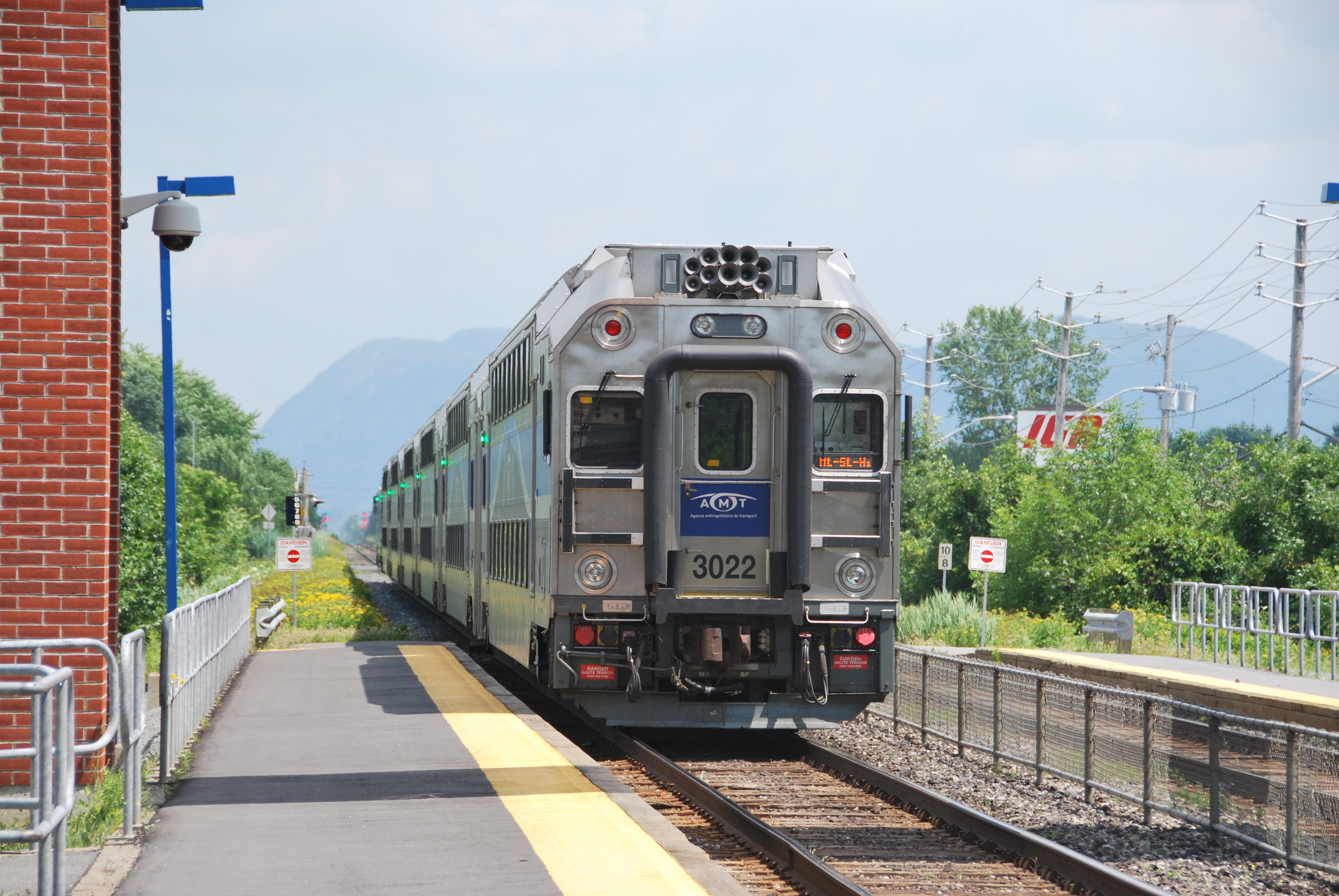
Exo runs commuter trains serving Greater Montreal such as this one on the Mont-Saint-Hilaire line.

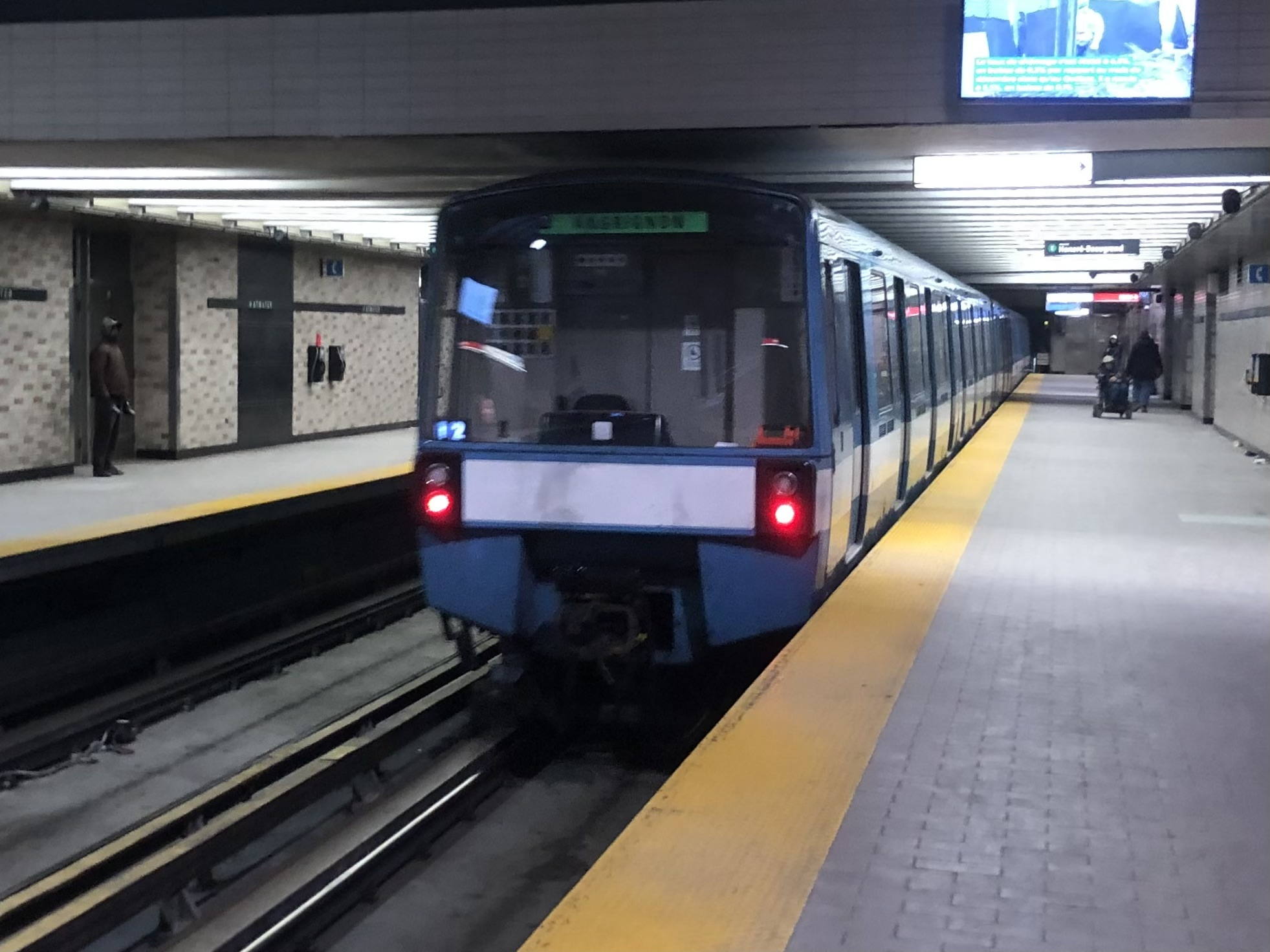
A Montreal Metro train leaving Montreal's Atwater station.

=== Intercity passenger service ===
VIA Rail, which is headquartered in Montreal, provides rail service to other cities in Canada, particularly to Quebec City, Ottawa, and Toronto with several trains daily on its Quebec City-Windsor Corridor.

Amtrak, the US national passenger rail system, also provides service to Montreal, operating its Adirondack train daily between Montreal and New York City.

All intercity trains operate out of Central Station. VIA and Amtrak trains also stop at several suburban stations, the largest of which is at Dorval, adjacent to the airport.

=== Regional passenger service ===
Regional passenger train service, geared largely to daily commuters to Montreal's central business district, is operated by Exo. Six train lines operate out of the Lucien-L'Allier and Central stations with Parc, Vendome, De la Concorde, and Sauvé as secondary stations. These facilities are all stops on the Metro system as well. Lines are operated under contract by Canadian National and Canadian Pacific. In some cases, Exo owns the track and infrastructure.

=== Freight service ===
Canadian Pacific Railway (known as CP or the CPR), now headquartered in Calgary, Alberta, was founded in Montreal in 1881. Its corporate headquarters occupied Windsor Station at 910 Peel Street until 1995. With the Port of Montreal kept open year-round by icebreakers, lines to Eastern Canada became surplus, and now Montreal is the railway's eastern and intermodal freight terminus. CPR connects Montreal with the Port of Montreal, the Delaware & Hudson Railway to New York, the Quebec-Gatineau Railway to Quebec City and Buckingham, the Central Maine and Quebec Railway to Halifax, and CN Rail. The CPR's flagship passenger train, The Canadian, once ran daily from Windsor Station to Vancouver. CP's passenger services were transferred to VIA Rail Canada in 1978.

Montreal-based Canadian National Railways (known as CN or CNR) was formed in 1919 by the Canadian government following a series of country-wide rail bankruptcies. CN was formed from the lines of the Grand Trunk, Midland and Canadian Northern Railways, and has risen to become CPR's chief rival in freight carriage in Canada. Like the CPR, CN transferred passenger services to VIA Rail Canada, now a crown corporation, but once part of CN itself.

== Public transit ==
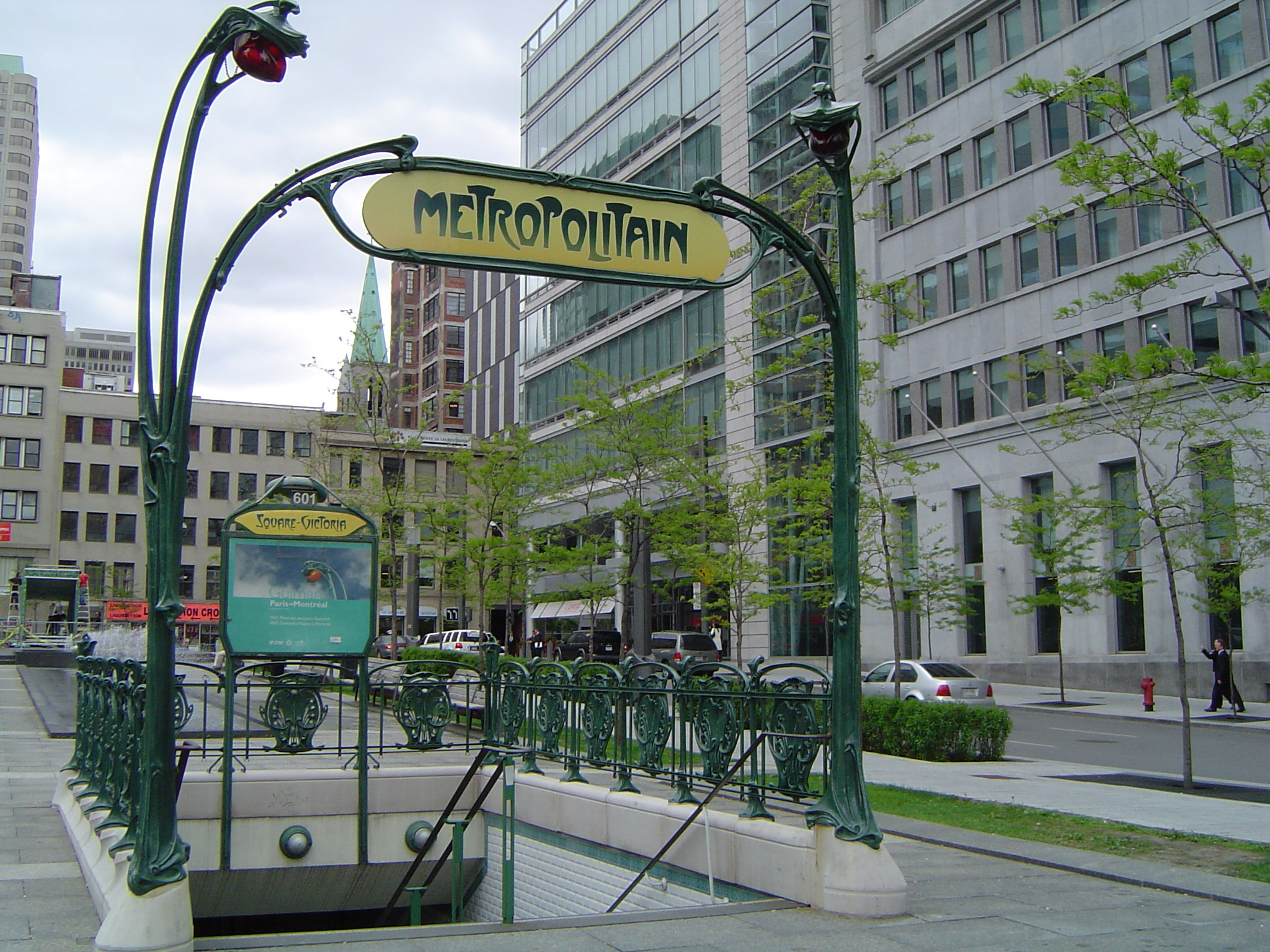
Metropolitan entrance to Square-Victoria–OACI station by Hector Guimard.

Greater Montreal is served by a number of public transit providers.

=== Société de transport de Montréal ===
The STM serves the Island of Montreal as well as islands of Bizard, des Soeurs, Notre Dame, and Sainte-Helene. The bus network consists of 165 daytime and 20 night-time service routes. STM also provides paratransit and limited wheelchair-accessible buses.

==== Metro ====
The Montreal Metro, a subway system, was inaugurated in 1966 and today has 68 stations spread out along its four lines. All but five stations are on the Island of Montreal and in STM's territory. Each station was designed by different architects with individual themes and features original artwork, and the trains themselves run on rubber tires, making the system quieter than most. The project was initiated by Montreal Mayor Jean Drapeau, who would later bring the Summer Olympic Games to Montreal in 1976. The Metro system has long had a station on the South Shore in the city of Longueuil, and in 2007, extended to the city of Laval, north of Montreal with 3 new stations.

Since Sunday, February 7, 2016, the new Azur metro cars are accessible to the users, one of the many features of these new cars is that they can accommodate up to 8% more passengers than the current models who have been running since inauguration of the metro.

The city of Montreal has announced plans to convert its entire fleet of buses over to all-electric by 2040.

=== Société de transport de Laval ===
The city of Laval, on neighboring Île Jésus, is served by the Société de transport de Laval (STL). The STL runs 40 routes, many of which connect to one of the three Laval Metro stations or to the RTM train station at Sainte-Dorothée. Other bus routes connect to Metro stations on the Island of Montreal, including Côte-Vertu and Henri-Bourassa.

=== Réseau de transport de Longueuil ===
Service to the densest part of Montreal's South Shore is provided by the Réseau de transport de Longueuil (RTL). RTL's numerous routes serve the Terminus Centre-Ville, the Longueuil Metro station, and several Exo train stations.

=== Exo ===
Exo provides commuter bus (as well as commuter rail) services to suburbs not served by the RTL or STL, via direct/express or feeder routes. In 2017, the Exo network carried more than 190,000 commuters daily.

=== Ferry services, summertime only ===
From late spring to early autumn, pedestrian/cyclist ferry service links the Old Port of Montreal, Saint Helen's Island, and the South Shore communities at Longueuil, a distance of 5.5 kilometres (3.4 mi).

Mid-July 2016, a proposal was suggested by a competing riverboat operator at establishing summertime weekday rush-hour pedestrian ferry service between the downstream, northeastern, outermost borough of Rivière-des-Prairies-Pointe-aux-Trembles and the Old Port, an approximate distance of 21 kilometres (13 mi). The city permanently adopted summertime sailings as of May 2019, and expanded service to seven days and six evenings per week. Having customarily trialed at 30 knots (approximately 34½ miles or 55½ kilometres per hour), implementation of the service has consequently seen its speediness reduced by at least one quarter; nonetheless, with its service even doubled during weekday peak hours it provides the valley with its swiftest sailings, and it even outpaces road traffic between its two docks.

Other scheduled Island of Montreal services:

- Lachine - Île Saint-Bernard (Châteauguay)
- Mercier (Montreal) - Île Charron (Longueuil)
- Pointe-aux-Trembles > Varennes (south shore) > Repentigny (north shore) > Pointe-aux-Trembles—a one-way circuitous trio of journeys that total 1½ hours' sailing time (roughly ½ hour each one).

Further nearby scheduled St Lawrence River services include:

- Boucherville - Île Grosbois
- Île à Pinard - Île Sainte-Marguerite—entirely within Quebec's Boucherville Islands Park
- Lavaltrie - Contrecœur
- Les Coteaux - Salaberry-de-Valleyfield
- Longueuil - Île Charron
- Notre-Dame-de-L'Île-Perrot - Beauharnois
- Notre-Dame-de-L'Île-Perrot - Pointe-des-Cascades

=== Réseau express métropolitain ===
On 22 April 2016 the forthcoming automated rapid transit system, the Réseau express métropolitain, was unveiled. Groundbreaking occurred 12 April 2018, and construction of the 67-kilometre-long (42 mi) network – consisting of three branches, 26 stations, and the conversion of the region's busiest commuter railway – commenced the following month. The first phase for five stations was opened on July 31, 2023 with a second phase opened at the end of 2025. Seven more stations are slated to open, becoming the fourth largest automated rapid transit network after the Dubai Metro, the Singapore Mass Rapid Transit, and the Vancouver SkyTrain. Most of it will be financed by pension fund manager Caisse de dépôt et placement du Québec.

=== Statistics ===
The average amount of time people spend commuting with public transit in Montreal, for example to and from work, on a weekday is 87 min. 29.% of public transit riders, ride for more than 2 hours every day. The average amount of time people wait at a stop or station for public transit is 14 min, while 17% of riders wait for over 20 minutes on average every day. The average distance people usually ride in a single trip with public transit is 7.7 km, while 17% travel for over 12 km in a single direction.

== Road network ==
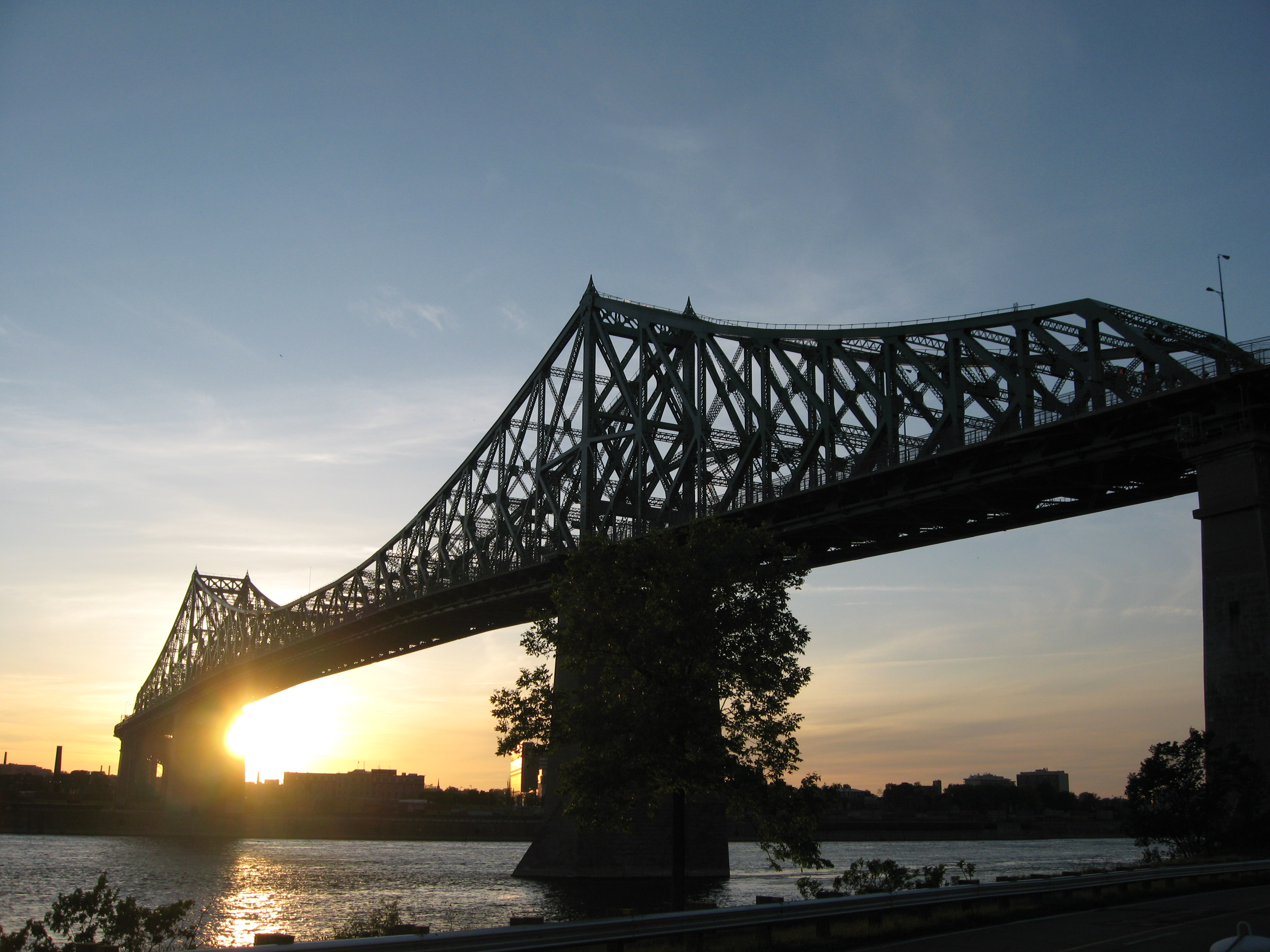
Jacques Cartier Bridge.

Like many major cities, Montreal has vehicular traffic congestion, especially from off-island suburbs such as Laval on Île Jésus, and Longueuil on the south shore. The width of the Saint Lawrence River has made the construction of fixed links to the south shore expensive and difficult. There are only four road bridges along with one road tunnel, two railway bridges, and a Metro line. The far narrower Rivière des Prairies, separating Montreal from Laval, is spanned by eight road bridges (six to Laval and two directly to the north shore).

On the Island of Montréal motorists are forbidden from turning right while facing a red traffic signal, a move permitted elsewhere in the Province of Quebec.

=== Limited-access highways (autoroutes) ===
Map of the major highways in Montreal

The island of Montreal is a hub for the Québec autoroute system, and is served by Québec autoroutes A-10 (known as the Bonaventure Expressway on the island of Montreal), A-15 (aka the Decarie Expressway south of the A-40 and the Laurentian autoroute to the north of it), A-13 (aka autoroute Chomedey), A-20, A-25, A-40 (part of the Trans-Canada Highway system, and known as "The Metropolitan" or simply "The Met" in its elevated mid-town section), A-520, and R-136 (aka the Ville-Marie autoroute). Many of these autoroutes are frequently congested at rush hour. However, in recent years, the government has acknowledged this problem and is working on long-term solutions to alleviate the congestion. One such example is the extension of Quebec Autoroute 30 on Montreal's south shore, which will serve as a bypass. Today's existing highways have been planned in the 1960s as part of a grid like transport system.

=== Street grid system ===
Since Montreal is on an island, the directions used in the city plan do not precisely correspond with compass directions, as they are oriented to the geography of the island. North and south are defined on an axis roughly perpendicular to the St. Lawrence River and the Rivière des Prairies: North is towards the Rivière des Prairies, and south is towards the St. Lawrence. East (downstream) and west (upstream) directions are defined as roughly parallel to the St. Lawrence River and the Rivière des Prairies, despite the fact that both rivers flow from the southwest to the northeast.

Saint Lawrence Boulevard, also known as "The Main," divides Montreal into east and west sectors. Streets that cut across Saint Laurent Boulevard undergo a name change, in that Est or Ouest are appended to their names. Streets that do not cross the Main do not generally contain a cardinal direction at the end of their names. Address numbering begins at one at Saint Lawrence Boulevard. The numbers increase as you move away from the boulevard. On north–south streets, house numbers begin at the Saint Lawrence River and the Lachine Canal and increase to the north. Odd numbers are on the east or north sides of the street, with even numbers on the west or south sides. Numbered streets generally run north and south, and the street numbers increase to the east.

Moreover, the addresses are on a grid-axis system, as in many North American cities. Streets generally retain their grid position throughout their course, even if they are slightly diagonal. For example:

- Sherbrooke Street, which runs "east–west" is 3400 (north of the Saint Lawrence), so a house on the northeast corner of Sherbrooke St. would theoretically be numbered 3401, and on the northwest 3400.
- Saint Hubert Street, which runs "north–south" is 800 East, so a house on the northeast corner of St-Hubert St, would be 801 (or 801 East if the street crosses Saint Lawrence Boulevard), and a house on the southeast corner would be 800 East.
- Peel Street, which runs "north–south" is 1100 West, so a house on the northwest corner of Peel St, would be 1101 (or 1101 West if the street crosses Saint Lawrence Boulevard), and a house on the southwest corner would be 1100 West.

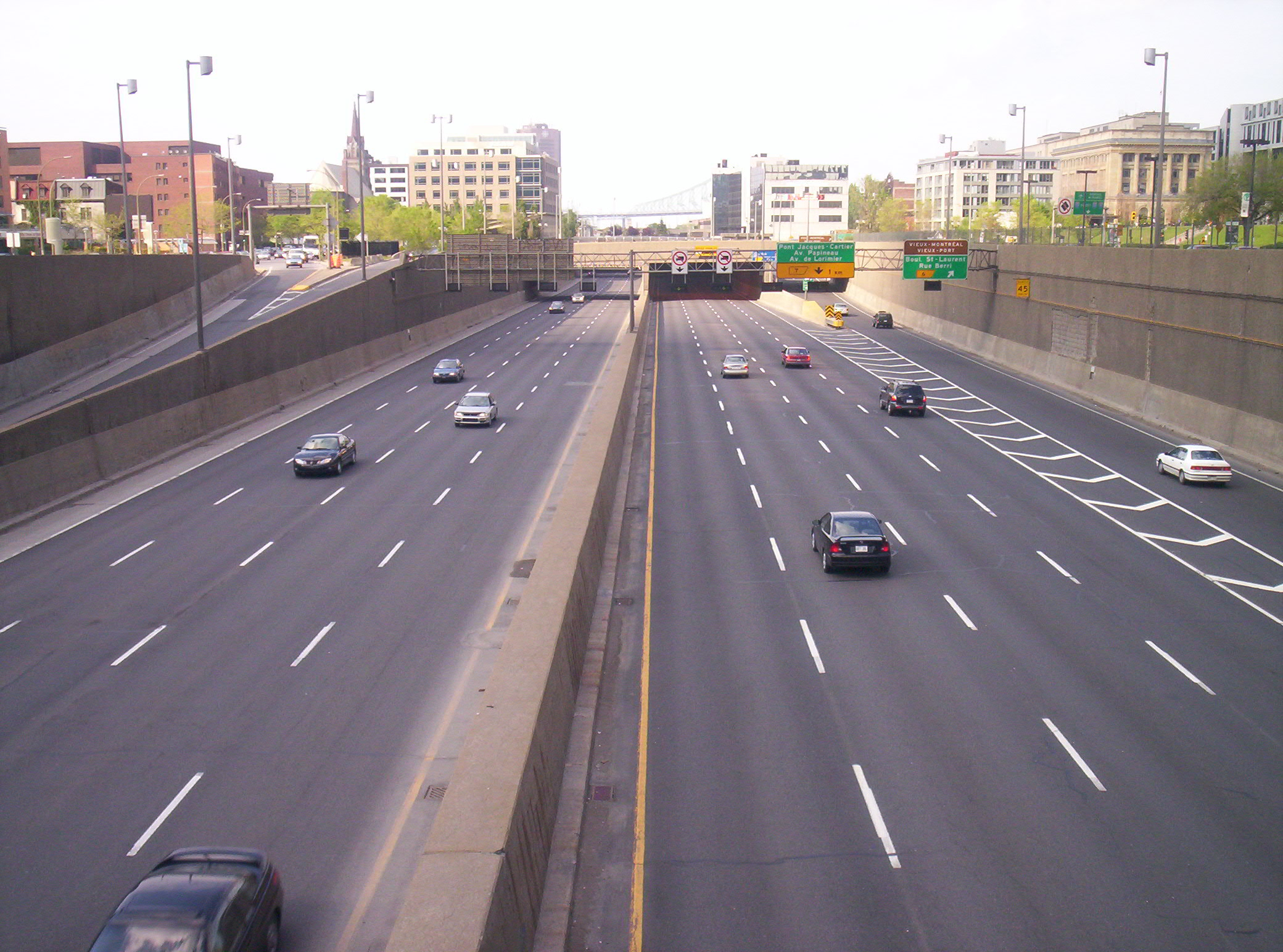
Ville-Marie Expressway, near Old Montreal

An anomaly is that zero is the Saint Lawrence River and the Lachine Canal, so address numbers south of the canal begin at zero at the river, then increase toward the canal, and the canal resets the address grid back to zero. Charlevoix Street crosses the canal, and Atwater Avenue formerly also did (the portion to the south has now been renamed Thomas Keefer Street); as a result, addresses south of the canal on these two streets have a leading 0 (zero) before the number to avoid repeating the same addresses that are used to the north. Therefore, 01000 Charlevoix Street is south of the canal, one block over from 1000 Hibernia; and 400 Charlevoix is north of it, one block over from 400 Lévis.

Other grid axes:

- North-south streets, east side: St-Denis 400, Atateken/Christophe-Colomb 1100, Papineau 1800, De Lorimier 2100, Pie-IX Blvd 4100, Honoré-Beaugrand 8000, St-Jean-Baptiste Blvd 12000, Rousselière 14000.
- North-south streets, west side: St-Urbain 100, Park Avenue 300, Peel 1100, Atwater 3000, Décarie 5300, Cavendish 6500, Dollard 8800, Des Sources 11800, St-Charles 17000.
- East-west streets: Notre-Dame 500, René-Lévesque Blvd 1150, Sainte-Catherine 1400, De Maisonneuve 2000, Sherbrooke 3400, Mont-Royal Avenue 4500, St-Joseph Blvd 5000, Beaubien 6500, Jean-Talon 7200, Jarry 8100, Henri-Bourassa 10700, De Salaberry 12000. Gouin Blvd, which follows the shore of Rivière des Prairies, is too crooked to have a constant grid reference.

The grid-axis system was introduced by the City of Montreal in the mid-1920s, but was not generally adopted by neighboring towns. Most on-island suburbs or boroughs merged recently on the west side of the island still have separate numbering systems, though most streets that start in the 9 original boroughs continue the Montreal numbering beyond its old borders. The highest address in Montreal is 23000 Gouin Boulevard West in the borough of Pierrefonds, beyond which begins the separate system of Senneville.

=== Street naming ===
Most streets in Montreal do not change name throughout their course, respecting their grid axis. Streets such as Saint Laurent Boulevard, Papineau Ave., De Lorimier Ave. and Pie-IX Blvd. have a foot in both rivers, and some street names are used for more than one section of street, despite gaps or interruptions.

There are a few notable exceptions which continue for historical reasons. A few north–south streets which begin in Old Montreal change name at Saint Antoine Street (formerly Craig Street), site of the former city wall (Saint-Pierre → Bleury → Park Avenue, Bonsecours → Saint-Denis). Only one street changes name many times: McGill Street → Square-Victoria Street → Beaver Hall Hill → Frère-André Place → Phillips Place → Phillips Square → Aylmer St.

According to the rules of the Commission de toponymie du Québec, the French-language form of street names is the only official one, and is to be used in all languages: e.g. chemin de la Côte-des-Neiges; rue Sainte-Catherine; côte du Beaver Hall. Most English speakers, however, use English generic equivalents such as "street" or "road", as do English-language media such as the Montreal Gazette. Officially bilingual boroughs have the right to use such names in official contexts, such as on street signs. In the past, a number of streets had both English and French names, such as "avenue du Parc" and "Park Avenue"; "rue de la Montagne" and "Mountain Street"; "rue Saint-Jacques" and "Saint James Street". Some of these names are still in common colloquial use in English, and are perpetuated by the tourism industry. Many streets incorporate an English specific name into French, such as "chemin Queen Mary", "rue University", "avenue McGill College". There are also a few cases where two names are official, such as "chemin du Bord-du-Lac/Lakeshore Road".

In English, the pre-Francization names are still commonly used, thus, although only the French is 'official', in English one often hears names such as Park Avenue, Mountain Street, Saint Lawrence Boulevard, Pine Avenue, Saint John's Boulevard etc. Canada Post accepts the French specific with English generic, as in "de la Montagne Street" or "du Parc Avenue", although many such forms are never used in speaking. Another anomaly that typifies this kind of mixed heritage and history is René Lévesque Boulevard. Once called "Dorchester Boulevard" in its entirety, this long east–west street was renamed for Quebec former nationalist Prime Minister René Lévesque, except for sections that run through the very Anglophone city of Westmount and the separate independent city of Montreal East. However, the entire street is still sometimes referred to as "Dorchester."

It is useful to note that, in Montreal as in other cities, the generic is usually omitted in either language, so one would simply talk of Park (or Du Parc), Mountain (or De la Montagne), Saint Lawrence (or Saint Laurent), University, McGill College, Doctor Penfield, or Fairmount. This is mainly because a specific is almost never given to two streets. If duplication exists, they are always in different boroughs or towns and are retained for historical reasons. For example, Montreal's present 19 boroughs have 6 streets named "Victoria" (2 streets, 2 avenues, one court, and one square), and 9 more in on- or off-island suburbs.

In recent years Montreal and most of its suburbs have dispensed entirely with such generic and linguistically fraught terms on their street signage. In some heavily Anglophone suburbs, including Westmount and Beaconsfield, the street signs now list the specific alone, e.g., "Claremont" instead of "Avenue Claremont" or "Claremont Avenue". Hampstead is an unusual case: its signs are bilingual, and most streets in the town are designated as "rue" (street) in French but also "Road" in English.

List of streets
North–south	East–west
Armand-Bombardier Boulevard; Atateken Street; Atwater Avenue; Beaudry Street; Berri Street; Bishop Street; Cavendish Boulevard; Champlain Street; Clark Street; Côte-des-Neiges Road; Crescent Street; D'Iberville Street; Décarie Boulevard; De L'Acadie Boulevard; De L'Assomption Boulevard; De Lorimier Avenue; Drummond Street; Guy Street; Honoré Beaugrand Street; Lacordaire Boulevard; Langelier Boulevard; Louis-Hippolyte-Lafontaine Boulevard; MacKay Street; Mansfield Street; McGill College Avenue; McGill Street; Metcalfe Street; Montcalm Street; Mountain Street; Panet Street; Papineau Avenue; Park Avenue; Peel Street; Pie-IX Boulevard; Plessis Street; Saint Andre Street; Saint Denis Street; Saint Hubert Street; Saint-Michel Boulevard; Saint Timothee Street; Saint Urbain Street; Sanguinet Street; Stanley Street; Des Sources Boulevard; University Street; Victoria Avenue; Visitation Street; Wolfe Street	Beaubien Street; Bélanger Street; Côte-Vertu Boulevard; Crémazie Boulevard; Côte-de-Liesse Road; Côte-Sainte-Catherine Road; Côte-St-Luc Road; The Boulevard; De la Commune Street; De la Gauchetière Street; De la Vérendrye Boulevard; De Maisonneuve Boulevard; Doctor Penfield Avenue; Duluth Avenue; Édouard-Montpetit Boulevard; Fleury Street; Gouin Boulevard; Henri Bourassa Boulevard; Hochelaga Street; Hymus Boulevard; Jarry Street; Jean Talon Street; Lakeshore Road; Laurier Avenue; Masson Street; Monkland Avenue; Mount Royal Avenue; Newman Boulevard; Notre-Dame Street; Ontario Street; President Kennedy Avenue; Pine Avenue; Prince Arthur Street; Queen Mary Road; Rachel Street; René Lévesque Boulevard; Saint Antoine Street; Saint Catherine Street; Saint Jacques Street; Saint Joseph Boulevard; Saint Patrick Street; Rue Saint-Paul; Saint Zotique Street; Sauvé Street; Sherbrooke Street; Somerled Avenue; Van Horne Avenue; Verdun Street; Victoria Avenue; Viger Avenue; Wellington Street

== Cycling ==
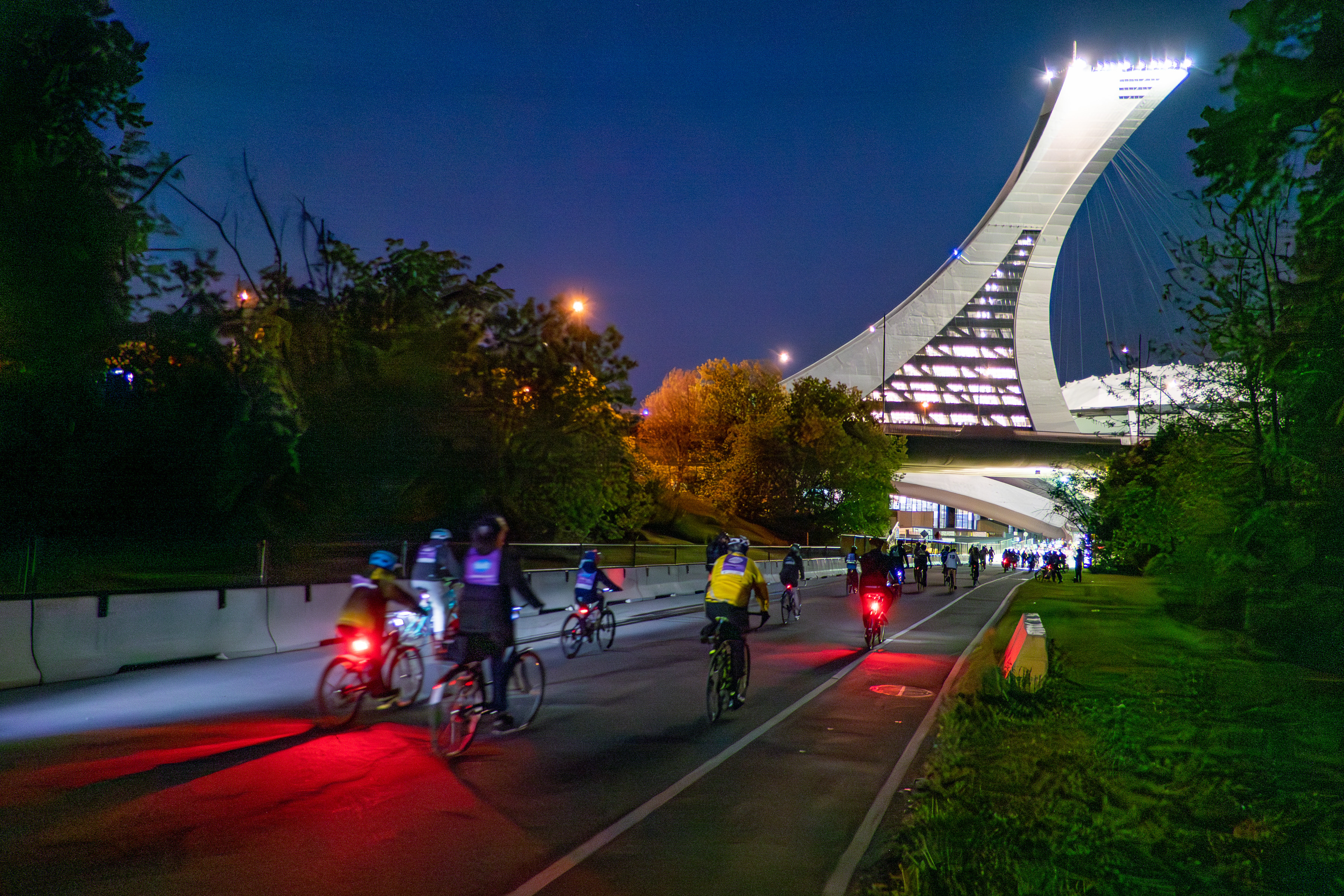
Tour la Nuit riders approach the Olympic Stadium, 2019

The Copenhagenize Index ranked Montreal in the world's top 20 cycling-friendly cities from 2011 to 2019. In 2015, a study reported Montreal as the city with the highest rate of cyclists, the most separated cycling lanes, and fewest cycling crashes in Canada. The city is also known for its shared cycling services, such as the BIXI network, and cycling events including Grand Prix Cycliste de Montréal and the annual mass group rides Tour de l'île and Tour la Nuit.

=== History ===
Cycling in Montreal began in the mid-1800s, with the establishment of several riding schools and the first Canadian cycling club, Montreal Bicycle Club, in 1878. Following the invention of the safety bicycle around 1890, the worldwide bicycle craze swept Montreal, introducing more people to cycling and leading to the creation of more clubs and better cycling networks.

In the 1970s, the second bike boom occurred in North America. Accordingly, the activist group Le Monde à Bicyclette demanded the establishment of bicycle lanes and a bike-friendly bridge across the Saint Lawrence River. The city introduced its first bicycle lanes in 1985 and a bike-friendly bridge in 1990. Also in 1985, Vélo Québec launched the cycle parade Tour de L'île. The parade has since attracted thousands of cyclists annually and is slated to continue as of 2020.

In 2013, an average of 116,000 bicycle trips were made each day on the Island of Montreal, an increase of 57% from 2008. Montreal's cycling network had more than doubled in size over the past 25 years, increasing in density and accessibility to people from different backgrounds.

=== Montreal's bikeway network ===
Montreal was the first Canadian city to install on-street cycling infrastructure. In 2017, Montreal had 850 kilometres of bikeway, with an average addition of 50 kilometres of new bikeway annually. There are four main types of bikeways: exclusive bike paths, bike lanes, designated shared roadways, and on-street paths. Exclusive bike paths, accounting for 37% of the network, are isolated from traffic, often by concrete barriers. These lanes are installed primarily on wide avenues, and often consist of lower height traffic signs and special bike signals to protect cyclists from vehicular traffic. Bike lanes, accounting for the second-largest share of the total network, are integrated within the roadway but are separated from traffic by small barriers and are at least 1 meter apart from vehicle lanes to ensure rider safety. Designated shared roadways, accounting for 24% of the total bikeway network, are often found on narrow streets. Designated shared roadways have no reserved bicycle lane, but priority is given to cyclists and speed is limited to less than 30 kilometres per hour to ensure rider safety. On-street paths (paved shoulders) are unique from separated bike lanes, as there is no buffer distance between vehicular traffic and riders.

=== Cross-river cycling ===
The Jacques Cartier Bridge bike path connects the Island of Montreal with the South Shore of the Saint-Lawrence River. However, the winter closure of the bike path between November and March has caused inconvenience for commuting cyclists. Beginning in ate 2019, operators of the bridge announced a pilot project with 25 daily participants to test the feasibility of opening the path to the public throughout the winter.

=== Shared bicycle services ===
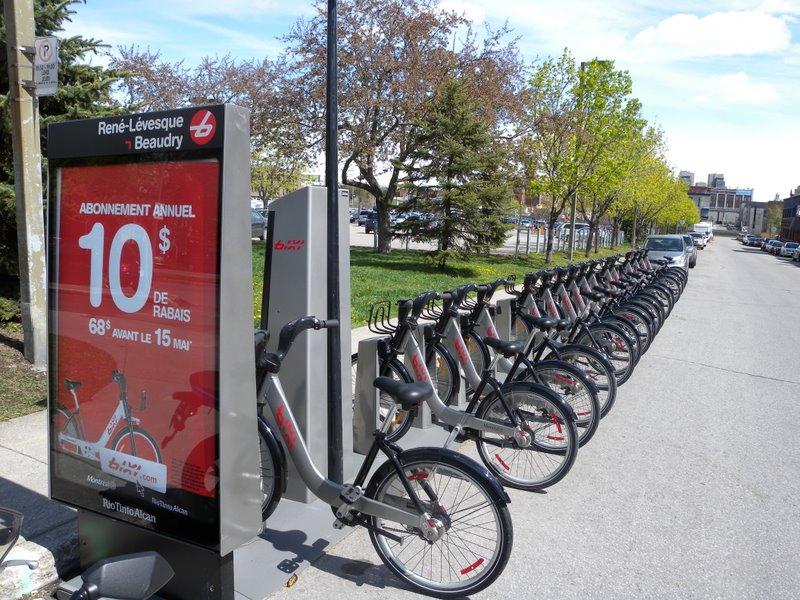
A BIXI station at boulevard René-Lévesque and rue Beaudry.

Montreal has one of the most innovative bicycle-sharing systems in the world (Austen, 2015). In 2009, the city launched the BIXI network with 3,000 bicycles and 300 stations, one of the first docked cycling-sharing systems in North America. As of 2020, 610 BIXI stations have been installed across 17 boroughs and 3 cities (Westmount, the Town of Mount Royal, and Laval), with 7,270 regular bikes and 160 electric bikes. An additional 1,000 e-bicycles will be added to the network throughout summer 2020. The unlocking fee is $0.50 and $0.10 per minute, and yearly memberships cost $99 In total, over 44 million BIXI trips have been made in the city since the network's inception.

In 2019, Uber launched a pilot project of its dockless “JUMP” electrical bicycles in Montreal, the first of its kind in Canada. JUMP bicycles can be dropped off anywhere there is a bicycle rack, are unlocked using Uber's smartphone application, and cost 30 cents per minute of usage. In 2019, there were approximately 1,000 JUMP bicycles in the city. Usage patterns of JUMP bicycles differed from BIXIs in 2019, with an estimated 28,000 trips in July 2019, compared to over 1.1 million BIXI trips in the same month. Despite the ban on other forms of shared e-scooters in summer 2020, JUMP bicycles are slated to return to Montreal's streets this year, but the city will charge a higher cost to Uber to obtain operating permits.

Time Magazine named the bike rental system #19 in Time's Top 50 Inventions of 2008. Bike rentals are also available at the Old Port of Montreal, as well as quadricycles, inline skates, children trailers, and Segways. The system was created to offer an attractive and easy-to-use option that complements existing public transportation networks for those seeking an urban alternative to traditional fuel-powered vehicles.

=== Réseau Express Vélo (REV) ===
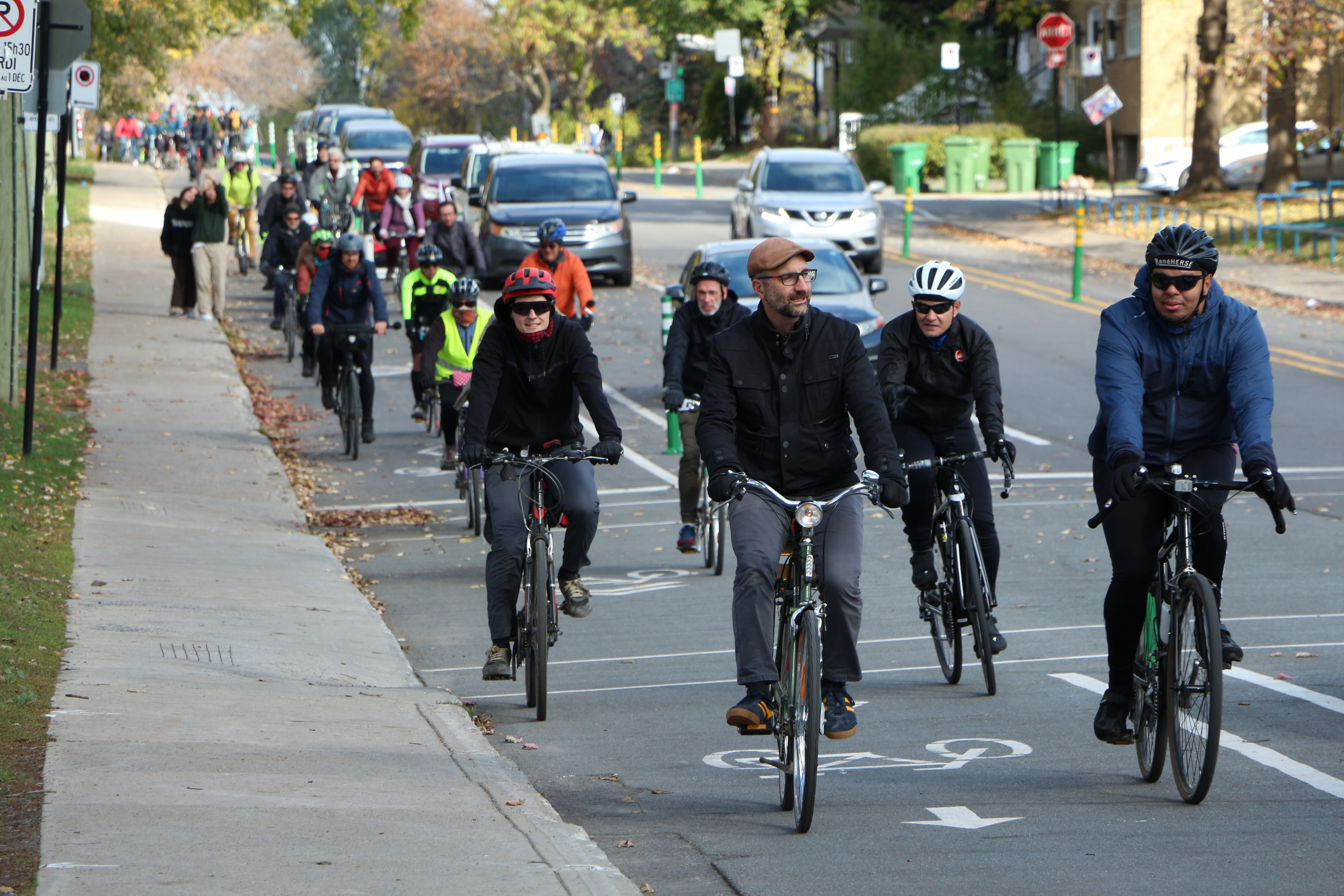
Cyclists on the REV in 2021 at the corner of Saint-Denis and Bellechasse.

On May 27, 2019, Mayor Valérie Plante announced the Réseau Express Vélo (REV). The initiative will bring 184 kilometres of new, protected bike routes to the streets of Montreal; see Figure 2 for the proposed network. The plans boast elevated bikeways, priority traffic lights, and concrete borders separating cyclists from automobiles for improved safety. This network will ensure that 44% of Montrealers live within 500 metres of new bicycle infrastructure (Jadah, 2019). The transitional period will feature the “installation of a physical separation barrier, securing of intersections and synchronization of lights, visual signature and signage for cyclists” while long-term permanent construction continues simultaneously. No timeline for the project's final completion has been announced.

==== Community response to REV ====
Local activists have questioned Mayor Plante's commitment to prioritizing cycling infrastructure, asserting that “there is no sense of urgency”, per Daniel Lambert of the Montreal Bike Coalition. Community groups say that the $15 million allocated for funding in 2019 is “nowhere near what the city should be investing to respond to the climate crisis and meet its own goals to get significant numbers of Montrealers out of their cars and onto bicycles”. Further, intense criticisms of the 26 kilometres of new bikeways in 2019-2020 have arisen in comparison to the average of 46 kilometres of bikeways per year implemented between 2008 and 2017. Marianne Giguère, the city's associate executive committee member responsible for active transit, has stated that this decision is evidence of a shifted focus towards “security and finding ways to separate bikes from traffic”. The city continues to work with activist groups to promote bike safety and improve infrastructure.

== Walking and walkability ==
Walkability is a measure of how pedestrian-friendly an area is. Numerous factors influence walkability such as street infrastructure, safety measures and mixed land use. Benefits include positive contributions to health and happiness, the environment, and socioeconomic factors.

=== Background ===
Active transportation, including walking, accounted for 15% of trips in Montreal in 2013, an increase of 9.1% from 2008. The largest increase was observed in neighbourhoods near the city centre.

Based on ease of access to errands by foot, Montreal is ranked by Walk Score as the second-most walkable city in Canada, with inner-city neighbourhoods such as Plateau Mont-Royal, Outremont and Ville-Marie obtaining the highest marks. Montreal is also home to around 50 car-free streets and one of the world's largest indoor pedestrian networks, improving access by foot to the downtown area.

==== Challenges ====
A key challenge to walkability in Montreal is safety, with 19 pedestrians killed by drivers of motor vehicles in 2019. Policymakers have responded by investing in improved pedestrian signals and by modifying traffic speeds and rights-of-way. In the Plateau Mont-Royal, Mayor Luc Ferrandez has gone further and cooperated with other boroughs to unveil a comprehensive action plan to prevent accidents.

Montreal has 122,600 people with limited mobility, who face special challenges. For these individuals, pedestrian-oriented infrastructure such as sidewalk cafés can limit mobility by blocking sidewalk access.

Another challenge to walkability is higher precipitation or wind speeds in the winter months, which has a strong negative effect on pedestrian count. Montreal almost implemented heated sidewalks on St. Catherine street to combat the winter weather, but eventually decided against it, due to costs. However, Montreal's underground city allows pedestrians to be protected from the weather while they walk from metro stops to some downtown buildings.

=== Increasing walkability ===
Walkability can be improved by ensuring:

- Pedestrians are the main priority
- Safe, attractive, and highly connected pedestrian circulation
- Denser neighbourhoods with mixed uses that support public activity
- Transit networks that are alongside highly walkable areas
- Complete streets that support multiple modes of transport
- Limited, higher-priced curbside parking and hidden parking lots

==== Plans that promote walkability ====
Following are some of the plans implemented in Montreal that focus on increasing walkability:

- Plan de Transport (2008) - Reduced the dependence on automobiles and focus on active modes of transportation.
- Plan D'Action en Accessibilité Universelle de la Ville de Montréal (2015-2018) - Pushed for universal accessibility especially for people with functional limitations.
- Politique de Stationnement (2016) - Introduced a new parking pricing approach, to create an environment that supports more sustainable mobility, and created a government body to manage parking.
- Plan D'Action Montréal Physiquement Active (2014-2025) - Push for compact urban areas, more pedestrian networks, and safer cycling routes to promote a more active lifestyle.
- Vision Zéro (2019-2021) - Aim to reduce the number of deaths and serious injuries on the road to zero.

=== Benefits ===
==== Health ====
Health benefits arise from nutritious food accessibility, high urban density, and physical activity. Moreover, walkability benefits seniors experiencing a decrease in mobility post retirement.

- Food access: Montreal ranks as the second Canadian city for widespread food insecurities and has a high number of food deserts, with a relatively high proportion of the population unable to access fresh food within a 500m radius. Having affordable healthy food within a walkable distance improves its inhabitants’ health potential. Indeed, the spatial unattainability of nutritious food is one of the leading causes of obesity in North America and "in 2007, the obesity rate of Montreal adults was 14.8%, compared with 11.8% in Toronto and 8.6% in Vancouver".
- Cardiovascular health & Obesity: Urban environments such as parks and green spaces can passively or intentionally stimulate the cardiovascular system leading to reduced obesity and an overall healthier and longer life. Contrary to gyms, these spaces are accessible to the whole socioeconomic spectrum, making shorter distances to such settings essential for the population's health. Mount-Royal park's immense size and central geographic position permit accessibility to a significant number of inhabitants. However, smaller parks are not found equally throughout Montreal. The future burden of chronic disease from obesity lies in Canadians with average BMI, and thereby a walkable environment benefits the greater number. Densely built neighbourhoods reduce physical inactivity since motorized commuting is unnecessary. Montreal is an island-city, thereby has a low index of urban sprawl. Besides its center, it possesses many dense mixed land-use neighbourhoods such as the Plateau and the Mile-End, which favour daily cardiovascular activity.
- Seniors: Walking is the main physical activity in the senior population of Montreal (individuals over the age of 65), decreasing the likelihood of physical and mental health issues. Walkability for seniors is influenced by physical mobility, individual abilities and spatial accessibility. Locations that exhibit greater walkability have more crosswalks, four-way intersections and limited dead-ends. Research shows that regions in Greater Montreal that have stronger walkability to grocery stores, have improved independent ageing for seniors, meaning their autonomy to carry out essential tasks safely is prioritized. Further research is needed to make regions more age-friendly, especially for seniors since walking is a key factor in improving the quality of life due to the health benefits of remaining physically active.

==== Environment ====
Montreal has 17 large parks, representing a combined area of 4900 acres. Green spaces like Jean Drapeau Park and Bois-de-l'Île-Bizard Nature Park promote walkability through the addition of pedestrian safe zones. In July 2016, there was an estimated 1.7 °C difference between “Car-Dependent” and “Walkers’ Paradise” neighbourhoods in Montreal, revealing that regions with increased walkability had lower urban air pollution and air temperatures due to less vehicle emissions. To further mitigate increasing temperatures, Saint Michel, Montreal has a plan by 2032 to plant new vegetation (i.e. trees) to promote walkability by cooling pedestrian walkways, benefiting the environment through carbon sequestration.

==== Socioeconomic ====
In Montreal, walking behaviour between regions varies due to socioeconomic factors like education level, employment and income. Research shows that low-income individuals in Montreal live in regions with less walkability due to a lack of infrastructure including pedestrian lanes and proper street lighting. However, overall walkability increases access to local businesses, thus promoting social interactions. Increasing urban development in tourist destinations like Old Montreal will subsequently increase walkability and attract more tourists and locals, promoting economic growth.

== Marine ==
The region of Montreal is centred upon the Island of Montreal, part of an archipelago in the Saint Lawrence River. As a result, marine transportation has been integral to the region's history. The Port of Montreal is one of the largest inland ports in the world.

Montreal also sits at the head of the Saint Lawrence Seaway, a waterway that allows ocean-going vessels to travel as far as Lake Erie and beyond. The Seaway replaced the earlier Lachine Canal which was the first facility that allowed boats to bypass the Lachine Rapids.

== See also ==
- Highway revolt - Montreal
- Plug-in electric vehicles in Quebec § Montreal
