= Tunnel of Death =

Tunnel of Death or Death Tunnel may refer to:

== Places ==
- Anzob Tunnel, linking Dushanbe to North Tajikistan, Tajikistan
- Lefortovo tunnel, Moscow, Russia
- Tunnel de la mort, Montreal, Canada
- Apennine Tunnel of the Bologna–Florence railway line
- Michigan Central Railway Tunnel, linking Detroit, USA and Windsor, Canada
- An entrance tunnel at Waverly Hills Sanatorium, Louisville, USA, used to transport the dead

== Entertainment ==
- Death Tunnel, a 2005 US horror film
- The Tunnel of Death, a locked room mystery story by Paul Halter
- "The Tunnel of Death", an episode of the 1935 film serial, The Lost City
- "Tunnel of Death", a mission in the video game Grand Theft Auto IV
- "Tunnel of Death", an episode of the TV series Adam Adamant Lives!

== Gaming ==
- "Tunnel of Death", the tunnel leading up to the flag room in the game World of Warcraft in the battleground Warsong Gulch, Typically it is where the flag carrier dies because they are left alone thinking they will be safe and are ganked by stealthers awaiting their arrival.

== See also ==
- Death (disambiguation)
- Tunnel (disambiguation)
- Tunnel of light, near-death experience element
