= History of cycling infrastructure =

The history of cycling infrastructure starts from shortly after the bike boom of the 1880s when the first short stretches of dedicated bicycle infrastructure were built, through to the rise of the automobile from the mid-20th century onwards and the concomitant decline of cycling as a means of transport, to cycling's comeback from the 1970s onwards.

== Pre-motorisation ==
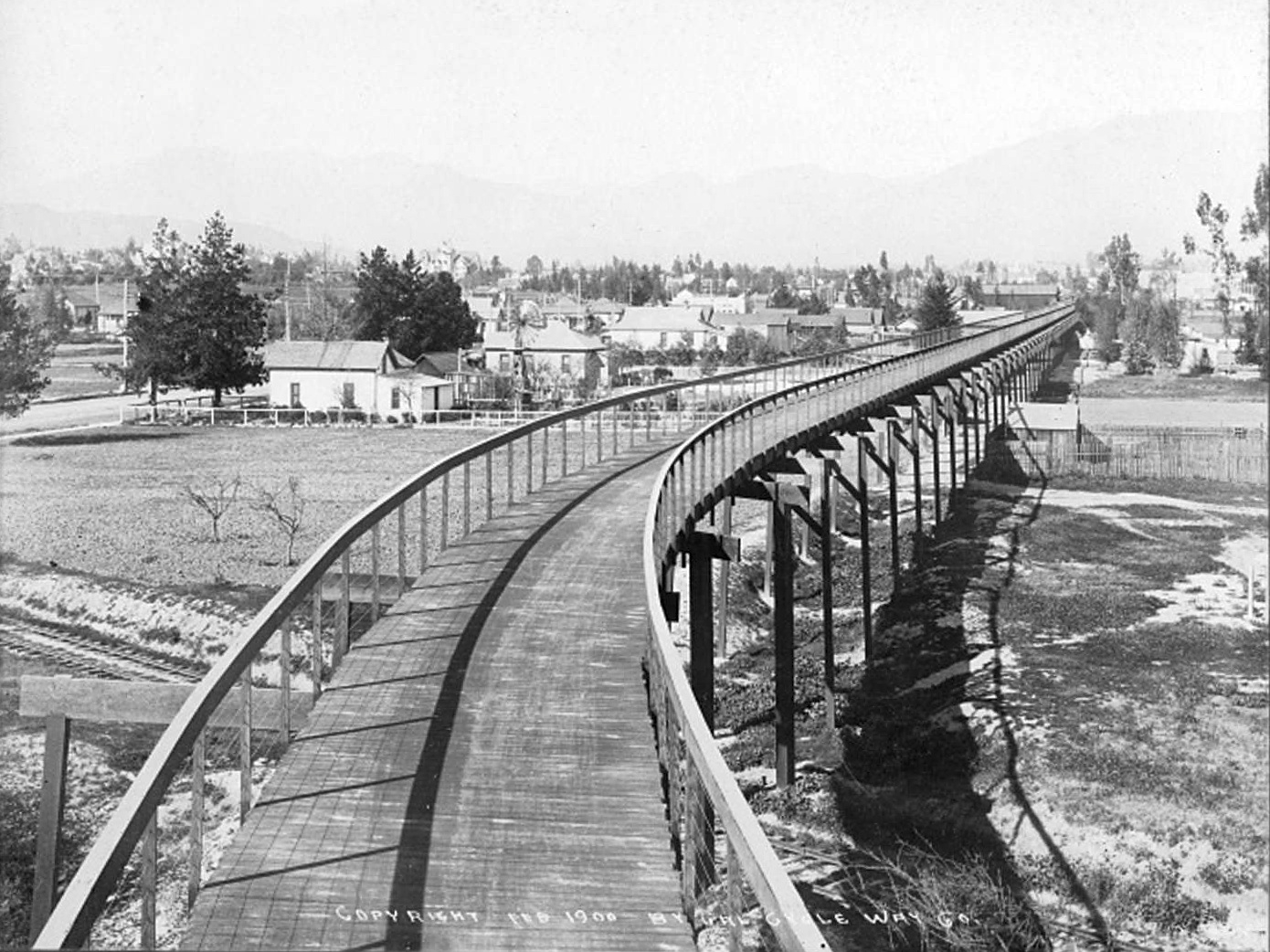
The California Cycle-Way, 1900

By the end of the 19th century, cycling was growing from a hobby to an established form of transport. Cyclists campaigned to improve the existing, often poorly surfaced, roads and tracks. A US group was the Good Roads Movement, another the League of American Bicyclists. The UK equivalent was the Cyclists' Touring Club (CTC), which distributed a treatise entitled Roads: Their construction and maintenance, and which, with the Bicycle Union, formed the Roads Improvement Association in October 1886. The first bicycle paths were built around this time.

In 1896 the first bikeway in the United States was created by splitting the pedestrian way of Ocean Parkway (Brooklyn). Following this successful installation numerous bicycle paths separate from the roadway were constructed by "bicycle path associations". In the United States the first was the nine-mile dedicated Cycle-Way built in 1897 to connect Pasadena, California to Los Angeles. Its right of way followed the stream bed of the Arroyo Seco and required 1,250,000 board feet (2,950 m^{3}) of pine to construct. The roundtrip toll was 15¢ US and it was lit with electric lights along its entire length. The route did not succeed, and the right of way later became the route for the Arroyo Seco Parkway, an automobile freeway opened in 1940.

Cycling in the Netherlands began in 1870 and by the 1920s was the most popular mode of transportation (at about 75%). The first bicycle path was built in 1885 in the city of Utrecht along the Maliebaan and in 1899 with two paved bicycle paths alongside the Breda–Tilburg cobblestone road. In Germany, concerns arose regarding conflicts between cyclists, horse traffic and pedestrians. The first cycle tracks were constructed in Bremen in 1897, and there were extensive plans for Hamburg as early as 1899.

== Early 20th century ==
With the advent of the motor car, conflict arose between the increasingly powerful car lobby and bicycle users. By the 1920s and 1930s the German car lobbies initiated efforts to have cyclists removed from the roads so as to improve the convenience of motoring. In the UK, the cycling lobby was attempting to remove motor vehicles from the roads by calling for the building of special "motor roads" to accommodate them. This idea was opposed by the Motorists' Union, who feared that it would lead to motorists' losing the freedom to use public roads.

=== United Kingdom ===
In 1926 the CTC discussed an unsuccessful motion calling for cycle tracks to be built on each side of roads for "the exclusive use of cyclists", and that cyclists could be taxed, providing the revenue was used for the provision of such tracks.

The first dedicated roadside optional cycle tracks was built, as an experiment for the Ministry of Transport, beside Western Avenue between Hanger Lane and Greenford Road in 1934 opened by Leslie Hore-Belisha, the new Minister of Transport. It was thought that "the prospect of cycling in comfort as well as safety would be appreciated by most cyclists themselves". Other early cycle tracks built before the 1939 Alness report included;

- Great West Road (1936)
- Chertsey Road (1930s)
- A24 (1930s)

However, the idea ran into trenchant opposition from cycling groups, with the CTC distributing pamphlets warning against the threat of cycle paths.

In the 1930s, Britain's Ministry of Transport built an extensive network of bike highways around the country—at least 280 miles of paved, protected infrastructure dedicated to cyclists alone. For decades, it was entirely forgotten—overgrown and overlooked—so much so that no one seems to remember that these lanes had existed at all.

Local CTC branches organised mass meetings to reject the use of cycle tracks and any suggestion that cyclists should be forced to use such devices. In 1935, a packed general meeting of the CTC adopted a motion rejecting ministerial plans for cycle path construction. The CTC were listened to, and the use of cycle tracks largely fell out of favour in the UK until the early 1970s. Since the 1930s, the established cycling lobby in the UK and Ireland has taken a critical and measured view of the utility and value of segregating cyclists. In 1947, in response to official suggestions that cyclists should use cycle-tracks, the CTC adopted a motion expressing determined opposition to cycle paths alongside public roads.

== Post War ==
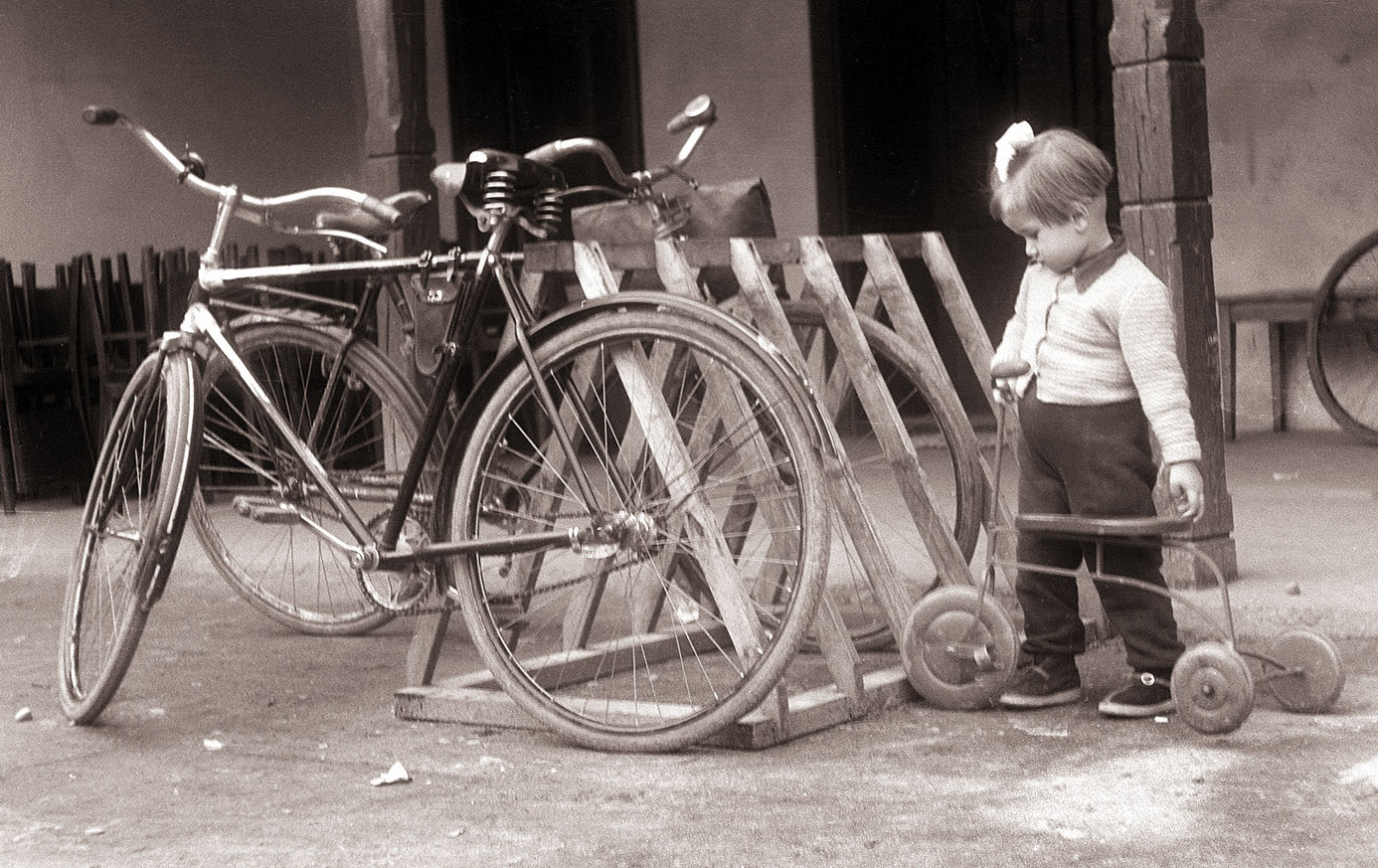
Makeshift bike racks in Slovenia (1956)

In the UK, little use of separate cycle track systems took place except in the so-called "new towns" such as Stevenage and Harlow. From the end of the 1960s in Nordic countries, the Swedish SCAFT guidelines on urban planning were highly influential and argued that non-motorised traffic must be segregated from motorised traffic wherever possible. Under the influence of these guidelines cyclists and pedestrians were treated as a homogeneous group to be catered for using similar facilities.

The guidelines strongly influenced cities such as Helsinki and Västerås to build large cycle path networks. By the late 1960s and 1970s, with the cyclists mainly gone, many German towns began removing cycle tracks so as to accommodate more car parking. Increasing traffic congestion and the 1970s oil shocks contributed to a resurgence in cycling in some countries, notably the Netherlands and Denmark. Outside of SCAFT-inspired developments in Nordic countries, the use of segregated cycle facilities was mainly confined to university towns with established populations of bicycle users. For example, in 1966, a 'Bicycle Lane' group in the City of Davis, California, were elected to the City Council promising to push for bike lanes in the state of California, achieving them early in Davis.

== 1970s ==
=== United Kingdom ===
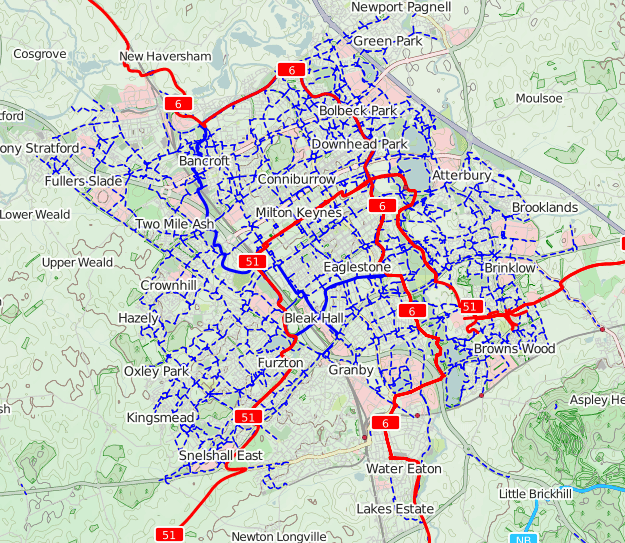
Cycleway network in Milton Keynes. NCR routes 6 and 51 are highlighted in red. (Extracted from Openstreetmap.org © OpenStreetMap contributors)

In 1970 in the United Kingdom, the Milton Keynes Development Corporation produced the "Master Plan for Milton Keynes". One of the important elements of this plan, and of its subsequent implementation, was the Milton Keynes redway system of segregated cycle/pedestrian paths. These are fully separated from the road system, only occasionally running alongside it. One of the aims of the redways was to make travel for pedestrians and cyclists convenient, safe, pleasant and accident free, but a study suggests that the system has only partially met these expectations.

More recent statistical data shows that the accident rate for pedestrians in Milton Keynes is just 46% of the average for England and the rate for cyclists is 87%. However, the secluded semi-rural nature of many redways that make them pleasant by day can make some people feel unsafe to use them after dark.

=== Netherlands ===
In the Netherlands, bicycle use declined from the post-war period up to about 1975 as automobile use increased and commuting distances increased. Bicycle traffic policy was almost completely excluded from the national government vision. Things began to turn around in about 1972 with not just the oil crisis, but also the all-time peak in traffic deaths—especially among children, the most vulnerable of road users—leading to a mass protest movement to Stop de Kindermoord ("Stop Child Murder"). Local and national policy began to pay more attention to cycling. Bicycle use, which had been dropping dramatically, stabilized and even rose over the next two decades. Amsterdam's traffic circulation plan of 1978 gave priority to bicycle facilities, in particular separated cycle tracks, which also meant taking some road space away from motor vehicles. The national government soon followed with subsidies for constructing bike paths alongside secondary and minor roads so that "lost ground could be made up". Another famous traffic circulation plan that gave priority to the cyclist is effective in Groningen.

=== United States ===
In 1971 in the United States, the California state government contracted with University of California, Los Angeles (UCLA) for the design of bikeways (bicycle paths, bicycle side-paths, bicycle lanes). UCLA largely copied Dutch bicycle facilities practice (primarily sidepaths) to create their bikeway designs, but the derived designs were not made public. The California Statewide Bicycle Committee (CSBC) was created in 1975, initially composed of representatives of governmental and motoring organisations. When John Forester, a cyclist representative, became a member he concluded that the real motivation for moving cyclists aside was the convenience of motorists, although the stated reason was the safety of cyclists.

When serious safety issues were identified with the proposed designs, the resulting cyclist opposition discredited the designs and prevented enactment of a mandatory side-path law. This forced the state to start over with new bikeway design standards in 1976. Those designs were subsequently adapted by the Association of American State Highway and Transportation Officials (AASHTO) to form the first edition of the AASHTO Guide for Bicycle Facilities, which is widely followed in the USA.

== 1980s to present ==
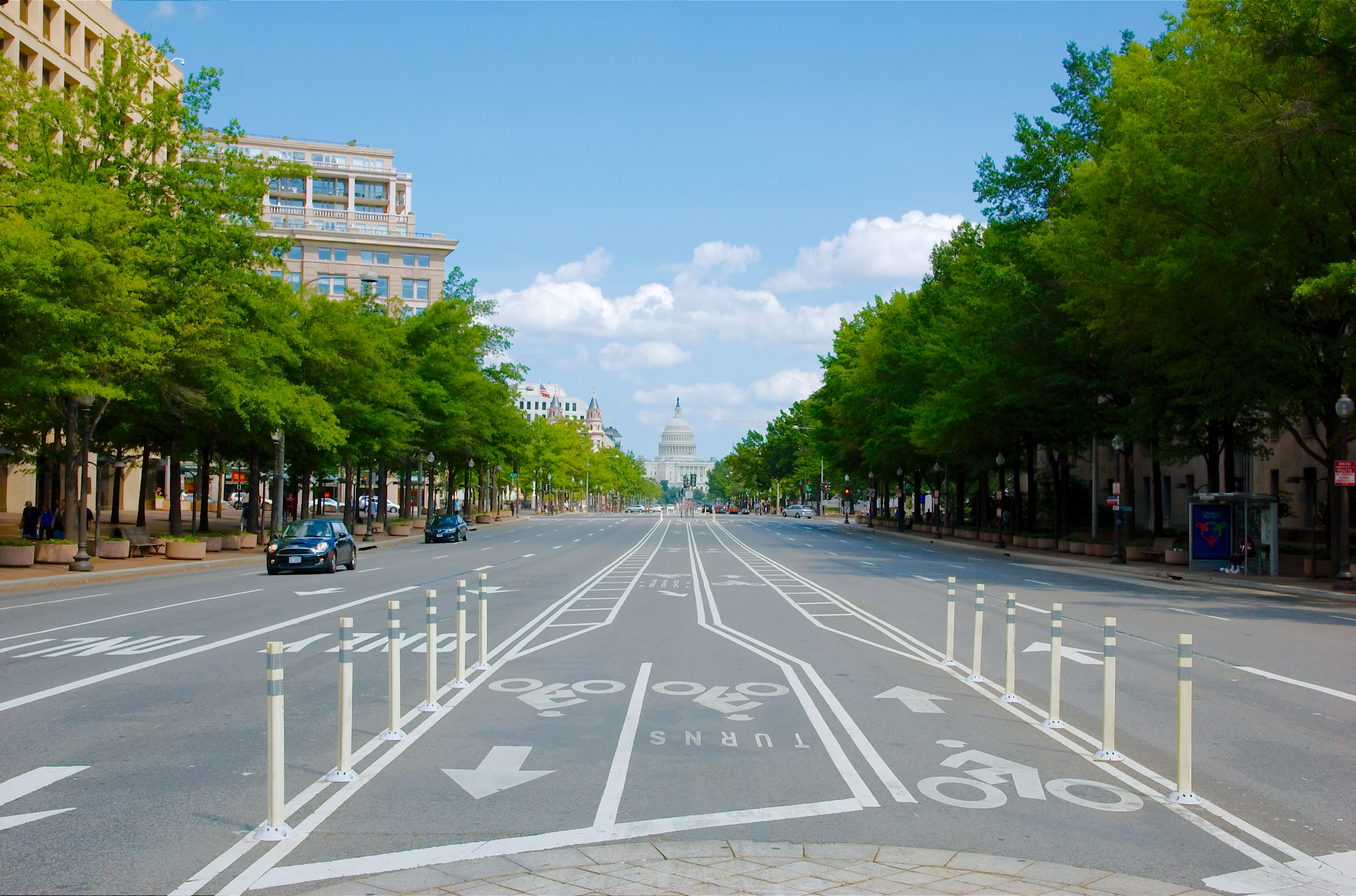
Center lanes on Pennsylvania Avenue looking toward the U.S. Capitol

The 1980s saw the start of experimental cycle route projects in Danish towns such as Århus, Odense and Herning, and the beginning of a large programme of cycle facilities construction as part of a "bicycle masterplan" in the Netherlands. Following the "bicycle boom" of the early 1980s, German towns began revisiting the concept.

The use of segregated cycle facilities is promoted by a large segment of the cycling community, for example lane and path cyclists, and also by many organisations associated with the environmental movement. The rise of the "Green" movement in the 1990s has been accompanied by requests for the construction of cycle networks in many countries. This has led to various high-profile cycle network projects, in Montreal, Dublin, Portland, New York, Boston, London and many other cities.

In the 2000s urban planners in several cities started to use models and simulations to estimate future bicycle paths usage and the extent to which they would improve community health outcomes.

=== United Kingdom ===
[Author Carlton] Reid and his collaborator, urban planner John Dales, are raising money on Kickstarter to continue their research, with the goal of restoring some of the network to use. (With two weeks to go, they've doubled their original fundraising goal.) They've already heard from cities on the network with money to spend. "Some of these cities look as though they'd be excited to work with us," Reid says. "We're going to work with the willing first." Soon, it's possible that these decades-old cycling highways could once again be part of Britain's transportation network.

== See also ==
- Cyclability
- Cycling infrastructure
- History of the bicycle
- History of cycling
- United States Bicycle Route System
- National cycling route network
