= The Seventh Hypothesis =

Book by Paul Halter

- Author: Paul Halter
- Original title: La Septième Hypothèse
- Genre: Mystery
- Publication date: 1991

The Seventh Hypothesis (French: La Septième Hypothèse) is a 1991 novel by Paul Halter.

One plot point turns on the revelation that a Mechanical Turk chess automaton was operated by a person inside the machine, reflecting a recurring theme in Halter's books that technology might allow seemingly-supernatural events to be real.

In 2014, The Guardian's Adrian McKinty considered The Seventh Hypothesis the third best locked-room mystery.
