= Saint Joseph Boulevard (disambiguation) =

Saint Joseph Boulevard is a street in Montreal.

Saint Joseph Boulevard may refer to:

- Saint-Joseph Boulevard (Gatineau), Gatineau
- St. Joseph Boulevard, Ottawa
