= Plug-in electric vehicles in New Brunswick =

As of October 2022, there were 1,932 electric vehicles registered in New Brunswick. As of October 2022, 2.3% of new cars sold in New Brunswick were electric.

== Government policy ==
As of 2021, the provincial government offers a tax rebate of up to $5,000 for electric vehicle purchases. As of 2022, the provincial government offers a tax rebate of up to $750 for electric vehicle charger installation in homes.

== Charging stations ==
As of July 2022, there were 102 public AC charging stations and 27 public DC charging stations in New Brunswick.

== By region ==
=== Saint John ===
The first electric bus was added to the Saint John municipal fleet in June 2022.
