= Tunnel de la mort =

Coordinates: 45°32′28″N 73°34′25″W

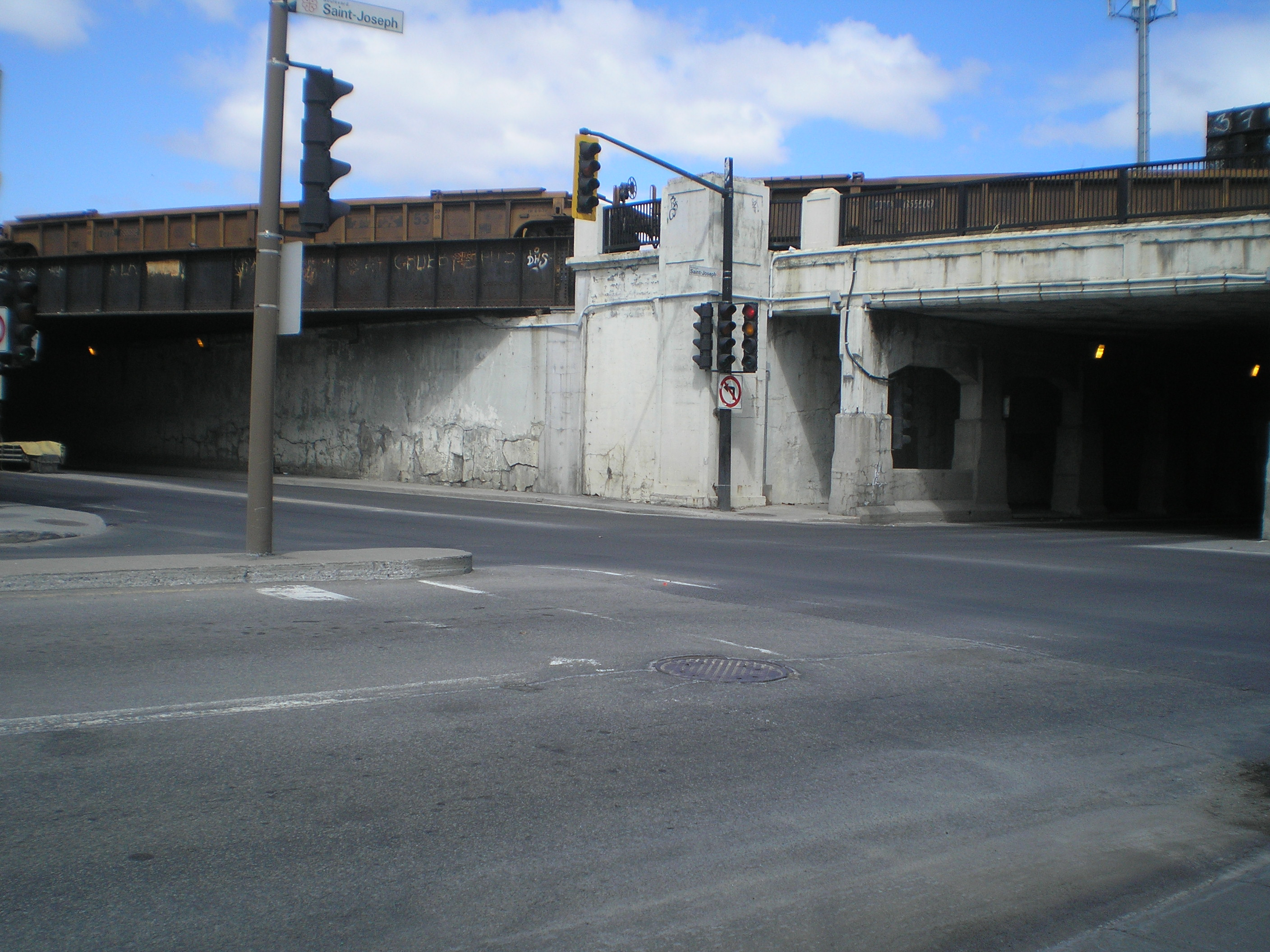
The intersection of Rue d'Iberville and Boulevard Saint-Joseph with the two railway overpasses still in existence. Originally, there was a third overpass right above the spot from which this picture was taken.

"Tunnel de la mort" (Tunnel of Death) is the informal name given, in Montreal, to the notoriously dangerous intersection of Rue d'Iberville and Boulevard Saint-Joseph, at the border of the Rosemont–La Petite-Patrie and Plateau-Mont-Royal boroughs. The intersection owes this name to the dangerously poor visibility caused by the three railway overpasses immediately to the north, east, and west of it, (Note: More accurately northwest, northeast, and southwest: in Montreal, directions are given relative to the flow of the Saint Lawrence River, which is considered west to east. All directions in this article are given according to that convention.) and by concrete retaining walls on all four corners. More than 250 serious accidents were reported at that intersection between 1992 and 2002.

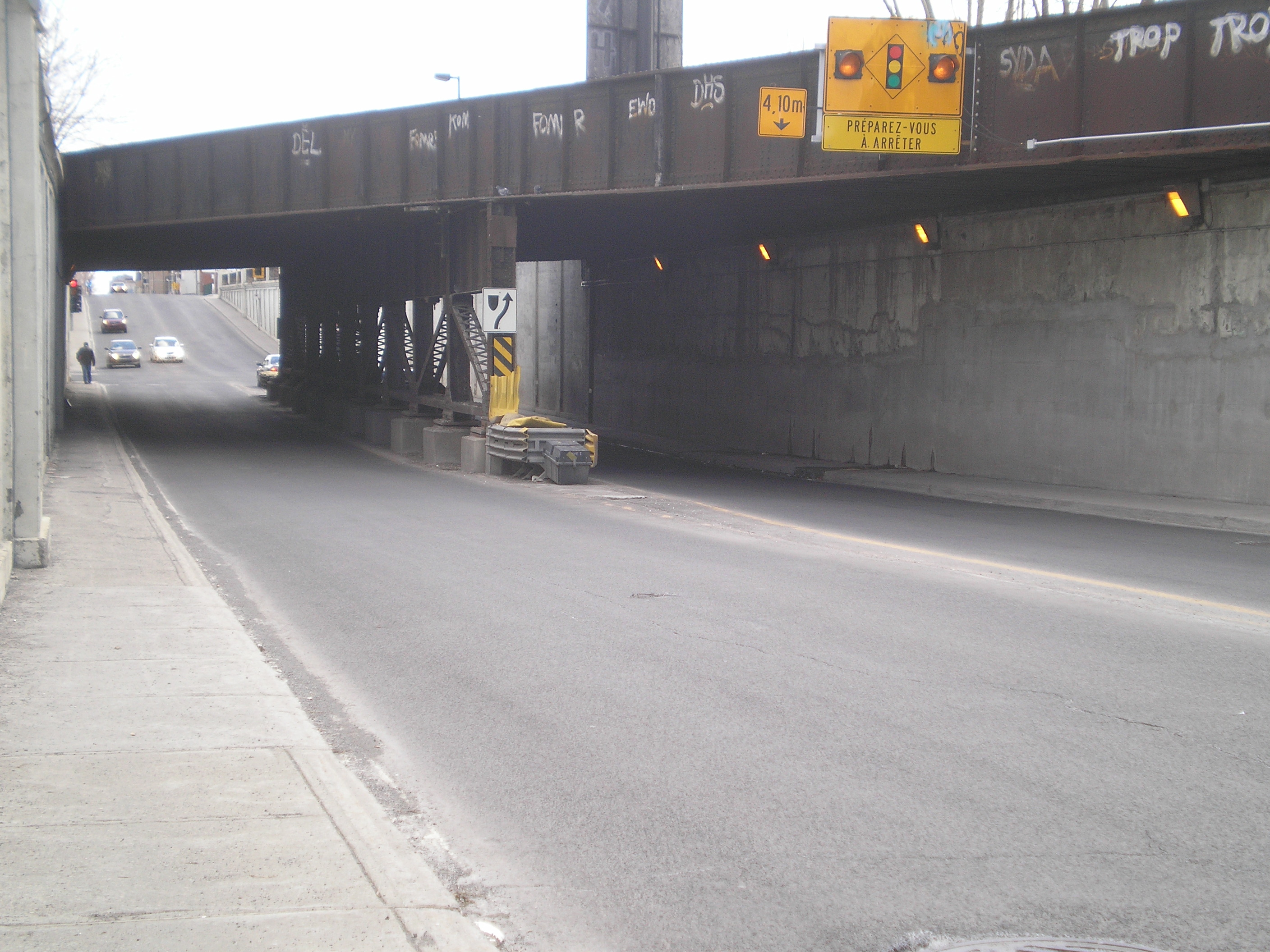
The Rue d'Iberville Nord approach of the intersection.

Both streets narrow at the approach of this intersection. The east-west Boulevard Saint-Joseph, elsewhere six lanes wide, narrows to four lanes in the vicinity of the Tunnel de la Mort. The four-lane Rue d'Iberville narrows to two lanes in the underpass just north of the intersection before widening again to the south and splitting into two four-lane one-way streets, Iberville (southbound) and Frontenac (northbound). As part of an effort to make the intersection safer, advance signals were installed on the Iberville north and Saint-Joseph east approaches, where flashing yellow lights warn motorists that they are about to come to a red light. All left turns are forbidden at the intersection.

The configuration of this intersection makes it nearly impossible for police to enforce traffic laws. In September 2001, then-minister of transportation Guy Chevrette cited this particular intersection as an example of a place where it is too dangerous to post a patrol car and highway code enforcement would thus benefit from the use of photo-radar. Finally, on April 4, 2002, roadwork to make the intersection safer began with the demolition of one of the three overpasses, the one above Saint-Joseph Boulevard just west of the intersection. It has been speculated that the remaining two overpasses would be eventually demolished as well, but to this day they are still in place. A major Canadian Pacific Railway line uses these two overpasses, making it impossible to demolish them in the short term.

According to the Ministère des Transports du Québec, the tunnel should have been completely demolished and reconstructed by July 2010. As of February 2024, the tunnel is still in place.
