= Paul Halter =

French writer (born 1956)

- Born: 19 June 1956 (age 70); Haguenau, Bas-Rhin, France
- Occupation: Author
- Writing career
- Genre: Mystery fiction

Paul Halter (born 19 June 1956) is a French writer of crime fiction known for his locked room mysteries.

== Biography ==
Halter was born 19 June 1956 in Haguenau, Bas-Rhin France and pursued technical studies in his youth before joining the French Marines in the hope of seeing the world. Disappointed with the lack of travel, he left the military and, for a while, sold life insurance while augmenting his income playing the guitar in the local dance orchestra. He gave up life insurance for a job in the state-owned telecommunications company, where he works in what is now known as France Télécom. Halter has been compared with the late John Dickson Carr, generally considered the 20th century master of the locked room genre. Throughout his more than forty books his genre has been almost entirely impossible crimes. A critic has said, "Although strongly influenced by Carr and Christie, his style is his own and he can stand comparison with anyone for the originality of his plots and puzzles and his atmospheric writing."

His first published novel, La Quatrieme Porte ("The Fourth Door") was published in 1988 and won the Prix de Cognac, given for detective literature. The following year, his novel Le Brouillard Rouge (Red Mist) won "one of the highest accolades in French mystery literature", the Prix du Roman d'Aventures. He has published more than forty books. Several of his short stories have been translated into English; by June 2010 six had appeared in Ellery Queen's Mystery Magazine; ten were collected and published by Wildside Press as The Night of the Wolf.

== Bibliography ==
=== Novels ===
Dr. Twist and Chief Inspector Hurst novels:

- La quatrième porte (The Fourth Door) 1987
- La mort vous invite (Death Invites You) 1988
- La mort derrière les rideaux (Death Behind the Curtains) 1989
- La chambre du fou (The Madman's Room) 1990
- La tête du tigre (The Tiger's Head) 1991
- La septième hypothèse (The Seventh Hypothesis) 1991
- Le diable de Dartmoor (The Demon of Dartmoor) 1993
- A 139 pas de la mort (139 Steps from Death) 1994
- L'image trouble (The Blurred Image) 1995 (Translated as The Picture from the Past, Locked Room International, 2014)
- La malédiction de Barberousse (The Curse of Barbarossa) 1995
- L'arbre aux doigts tordus (The Tree with Twisted Fingers) 1996 (Translated as The Vampire Tree, Locked Room International, 2016)
- Le cri de la sirène (The Siren's Call) 1998
- Meurtre dans un manoir anglais (Murder in an English Manor) 1998
- L'homme qui aimait les nuages (The Man Who Loved Clouds) 1999
- L'allumette sanglante (The Bloody Match) 2001
- Le toile de Pénélope (Penelope's Web) 2001
- Les larmes de Sibyl (Sibyl's Tears) 2005
- Les meurtres de la salamandre (The Salamander Murders) 2009
- La corde d'argent (The Silver Thread) 2010
- Le voyageur du passé (The Traveler from the Past) 2012
- La tombe indienne (The Indian Tomb) 2013

Dr. Twist and Chief Inspector Hurst short stories:

- "Les morts dansent la nuit" (The Dead Dance at Night) in the collection La nuit du loup (The Night of the Wolf) 2000
- "L'appel de la Lorelei" (The Call of the Lorelei) in the collection La nuit du loup (The Night of the Wolf) 2000
- "Meurtre à Cognac" (Murder in Cognac) in the collection La nuit du loup (The Night of the Wolf) 2000
- "La balle de Nausicaa" (Nausicaa's Ball) in the collection La balle de Nausicaa 2011
- "La tombe de David Jones" (David Jones' Tomb) in the collection La balle de Nausicaa 2011
- "Le gong hanté" (The Gong of Doom) in Ellery Queen's Mystery Magazine, June 2010
- "L'echelle de Jacob" (Jacob's Ladder) in Ellery Queen's Mystery Magazine, February 2014
- "La vengeance de l'épouvantail" (The Scarecrow's Revenge) in Ellery Queen's Mystery Magazine, May 2016
- "Le livre juane" (The Yellow Book) in Ellery Queen's Mystery Magazine, July–August 2017
- "Les fuex de l'Enfer" (The Fires of Hell) in Ellery Queen's Mystery Magazine, May–June 2018
- "Les Sortilèges du Wendigo" (The Wendigo’s Spell) in Ellery Queen’s Mystery Magazine, May–June 2023
- "Dix petits soldats" (Ten Little Soldiers) in Nuef crimes dans la neige, 2025
- "The Hanged Man's Bride" in All the Crime in the World, 2026

Owen Burns and Achilles Stock novels:

- Le roi du désordre (The Lord of Misrule) 1994
- Les sept merveilles du crime (The Seven Wonders of Crime) 1997
- Les douze crimes d'Hercule (The Twelve Crimes of Hercules) 2001
- La ruelle fantôme (The Phantom Passage) 2005
- La chambre d'Horus (The Chamber of Horus) 2007
- Le masque du vampire (The Mask of the Vampire) 2014
- La montre en or (The Gold Watch) 2019
- La mystére de la dame blanche (The White Lady) 2020

Owen Burns and Achilles Stock short stories:

- "La marchande de fleurs" (The Flower Girl) in the collection La nuit du loup (The Night of the Wolf) 2000
- "La hache" (The Cleaver) in the collection La nuit du loup (The Night of the Wolf) 2000
- "L'homme au visage d'argile" (The Man with the Face of Clay) in Ellery Queen's Mystery Magazine, July 2012
- "Le loup de Fenrir" (The Wolf of Fenrir) in Ellery Queen's Mystery Magazine, March–April 2015
- "Le casque d'Hades" (The Helm of Hades) in Ellery Queen's Mystery Magazine, March–April 2019
- "Le Voleur d’étoiles" (The Celestial Thief) in Ellery Queen's Mystery Magazine, September–October 2021

Other novels:

- Le brouillard rouge (The Crimson Fog) 1988
- La lettre qui tue (The Deadly Letter) 1992
- Le cercle invisible (The Invisible Circle) 1996
- Le crime de Dédale (The Crime of Daedalus) 1997
- Le géant de pierre (The Stone Giant) 1998
- Le mystère de l'Allée des Anges (The Mystery of Angels' Lane) 1999
- Le chemin de la lumière (The Path of Light) 2000
- Les fleurs de Satan (Satan's Flowers) 2002
- Le tigre borgne (The One-Eyed Tiger) 2004
- Lunes assassines (Killers' Moon) 2006
- La nuit du Minotaure (The Night of the Minotaur) 2008
- Le testament de Silas Lydecker (The Will of Silas Lydecker) 2009
- Spiral 2012
- Le Spectre d'Eurydice (The Ghost of Eurydice) 2023
- La Tour du passé (The Tower of the Past) 2024

Other short stories:

- "L'escalier assassin" (The Tunnel of Death) in the collection La nuit du loup (The Night of the Wolf) 2000
- "Un rendez-vous aussi saugrenu" (untranslatable pun) in the collection La nuit du loup (The Night of the Wolf) 2000
- "Ripperomanie" (Rippermania) in the collection La nuit du loup (The Night of the Wolf) 2000
- "La nuit du loup" (The Night of the Wolf) in the collection La nuit du loup (The Night of the Wolf) 2000
- "Le spectre doré" (The Golden Ghost) in the collection La balle de Nausicaa 2011 and "The Night of the Wolf" (English Edition) 2006
- "Le regard étrange" (The Unsettling Gaze) in the collection La balle de Nausicaa 2011
- "L'abominable homme de neige" (The Abominable Snowman) in the collection La balle de Nausicaa 2011 and The Night of the Wolf (English Edition) 2006
- "Le clown de minuit" (The Midnight Clown) in the collection La balle de Nausicaa 2011
- "La malle sanglante" (The Bloody Trunk) in the collection La balle de Nausicaa 2011

Short story collections:

- La nuit du loup (The Night of the Wolf) 2000
- La balle de Nausicaa (Nausicaa's Ball) 2011
- The Helm of Hades 2019
- Le livre jaune (The Yellow Book) 2022
- Neuf crimes dans la neige (Nine Crimes in the Snow) 2025
