= Saint-Joseph Boulevard =

Street in Montreal, Canada

Coordinates: 45°31′35″N 73°35′16″W

Saint Joseph Boulevard
- Native name: French: boulevard Saint-Joseph
- Location: Island of Montreal
- West end: Côte-Sainte-Catherine Road
- Major junctions: R-335 Saint Denis Street
- East end: R-125 Pie-IX Boulevard

Saint Joseph Boulevard (official in French: boulevard Saint-Joseph) is a major boulevard located east of Mount Royal in Montreal, Quebec, Canada. Although it is mainly residential, it is a major east–west artery in the Plateau Mont-Royal and the Rosemont–La Petite-Patrie boroughs. Its intersection with D'Iberville Street is known as the infamous Tunnel de la mort (Death Tunnel). Laurier metro station is located on the boulevard. It also intersects Route 335 (Saint Denis Street).

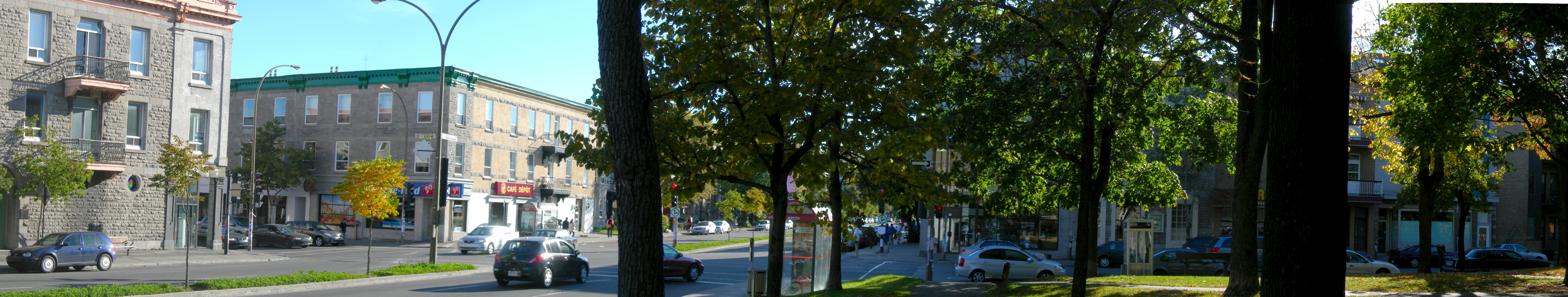
The intersection of Saint Laurent Boulevard and Saint Joseph Boulevard.

== See also ==
- Saint Joseph Boulevard (disambiguation)
