= D'Iberville Street =

Thoroughfare in Montreal, Canada

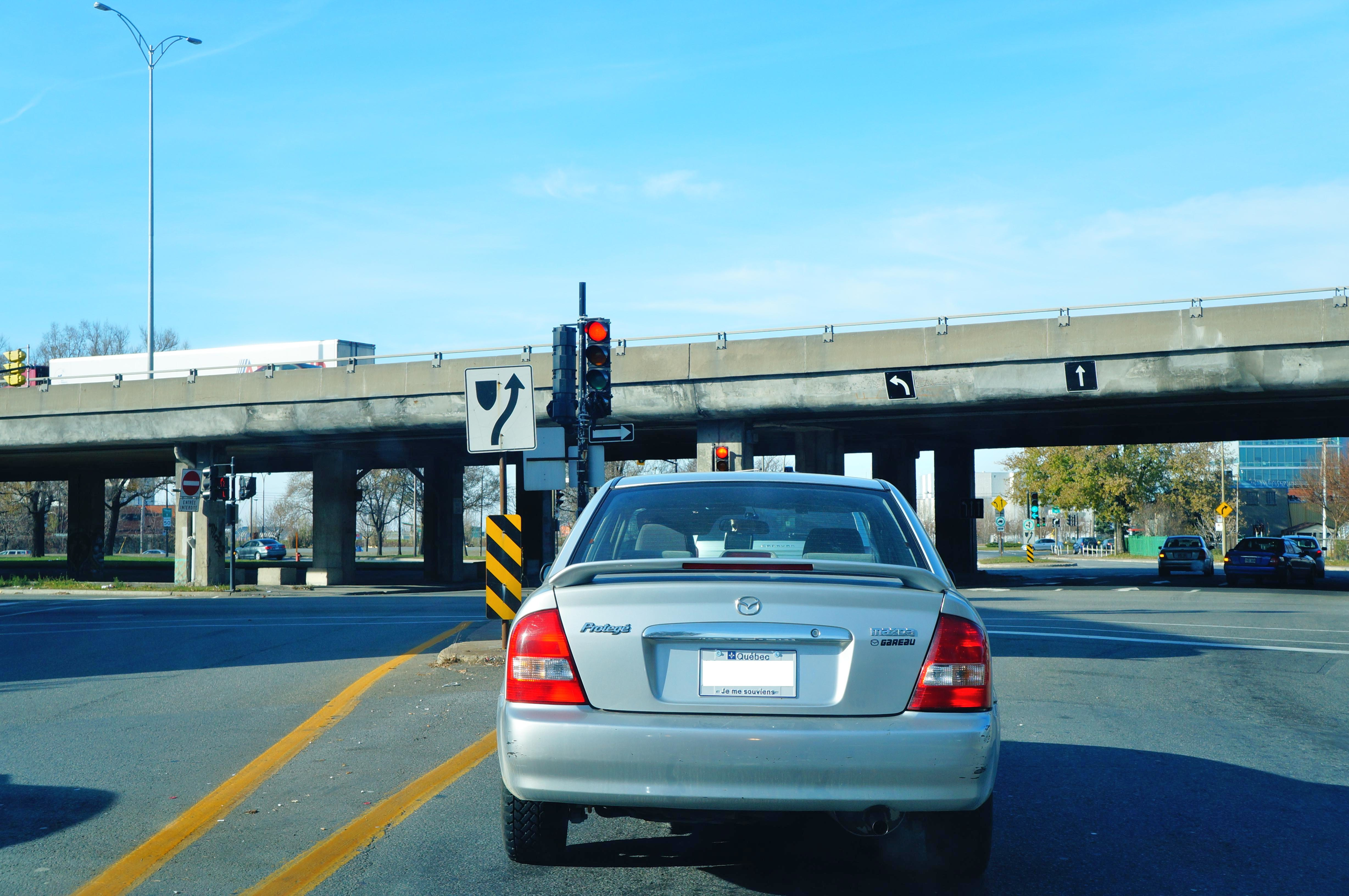
- D'Iberville Street near Autoroute 40
- Interactive map of D'Iberville Street
- Native name: Rue D'Iberville (French)
- Length: 6.4 km (4 mi)
- Location: Between Notre-Dame Street to north of Gouin Boulevard
- Major junctions: A-40 (TCH); R-138

Construction
- Inauguration: 1879

D'Iberville Street (French: Rue D'Iberville) is a north-south thoroughfare of Montreal.

== Location and access ==
The street passes through five Montreal boroughs: Ahuntsic-Cartierville, Le Plateau-Mont-Royal, Rosemont–La Petite-Patrie, Ville-Marie, and Villeray–Saint-Michel–Parc-Extension.

Its main section starts at Notre-Dame Street and continues up to Jarry Street. Two other sections exist north of the main section: the first is from Du Pélican Street to Charland Street, and the second is from De Port-Royal Street to north of Gouin Boulevard. D'Iberville station, part of the Montreal Metro's Blue Line, is located at its intersection with Jean-Talon Street. The 94 D'Iberville bus of the STM circulates along the street for much of its path, connecting D'Iberville station to Frontenac station.

From Le Plateau-Mont-Royal to Ville-Marie, D'Iberville Street runs parallel to Frontenac Street, where both streets' southern end is at Notre-Dame Street. Frontenac Street's northern end is at D'Iberville Street, after Mont-Royal Avenue, where the two streets then merge and continue as D'Iberville Street.

== Name ==
The street is named after Pierre Le Moyne, Sieur d'Iberville (1661-1706), a soldier and explorer who was born in Montreal and was the third son of Charles Le Moyne. In 1700, he founded the district of Louisiana (named in honor of King Louis XIV), and also served as its first governor in addition to founding the present-day city of Mobile, Alabama in 1702.

== Notable buildings and places of interest ==
- The borough hall of the Rosemont–La Petite-Patrie borough is located along this street, inside an office complex building.
- Molson Park (French: Parc Molson), a municipal park in Rosemont–La Petite-Patrie, is located at the street's intersection with Beaubien Street.
- Its intersection with Saint Joseph Boulevard is known as the infamous Tunnel de la mort (Death Tunnel).
