= Plug-in electric vehicles in the Northwest Territories =

As of September 2021, there were 10 battery electric vehicles and 12 plug-in hybrid vehicles registered in the Northwest Territories.

== Government policy ==
As of January 2022, the territorial government offered tax rebates of $5,000 for electric vehicle purchases, and $500 for charging station installations; however, as of July 2022, the territorial government does not offer any tax incentives.

== Charging stations ==
As of February 2022, there were six public charging stations in the Northwest Territories, all of which were AC level 2.

== Manufacturing ==
The Northwest Territories has been proposed as a hub for mining of minerals for use in electric vehicles.
