= Plug-in electric vehicles in Nova Scotia =

As of May 2023, there were about 2,000 electric vehicles in Nova Scotia.

== Government policy ==
As of April 2022, the provincial government offered tax rebates of $3,000 for electric vehicle purchases.

== Charging stations ==
As of 2022, there were about 150 charging stations in Nova Scotia, with 14 DC charging stations.

== Manufacturing ==
Nova Scotia has been proposed as a hub for the mining of materials for electric vehicles.

== By region ==
=== Cape Breton ===
As of 2022, there were 27 charging station locations on Cape Breton Island with 83 AC level 2 charging ports and two DC charging ports.

=== Halifax ===
As of 2021, there were around 500 electric vehicles registered in the Halifax Regional Municipality.
