= Plug-in electric vehicles in Manitoba =

As of June 2021, there were around 800 electric vehicles (not including plug-in hybrid vehicles) registered in Manitoba. As of 2021, about 0.8% of all new vehicles registered in Manitoba were electric.

== Government policy ==
As of September 2022, the provincial government does not offer any tax incentives for electric vehicle purchases.

== Manufacturing ==
Manitoba has been proposed as a hub for the mining of lithium to be used in electric vehicle batteries.

== By region ==
=== Brandon ===
As of March 2022, there were eight public charging stations in Brandon.

=== Winnipeg ===
As of April 2022, there were 15 public charging stations in Winnipeg, three of which were DC charging stations.
