= Plug-in electric vehicles in Newfoundland and Labrador =

As of 2021, there were 280 electric vehicles (not including plug-in hybrid vehicles) registered in Newfoundland and Labrador.

== Government policy ==
As of April 2022, the provincial government offers tax rebates of $2,500 for purchases of electric vehicles, and $1,500 for plug-in hybrid vehicles.

== Charging stations ==
As of 2021, there were 14 DC charging stations in the province, all of them on Newfoundland.

== Manufacturing ==
The province has been proposed as a mining hub for minerals to be used in electric vehicles.
