= Plug-in electric vehicles in Yukon =

As of February 2022, there were 130 electric vehicles registered in Yukon.

== Government policy ==
As of March 2022, the territorial government offers tax rebates of $5,000 for electric vehicle purchases. As of September 2020, the territorial government offers tax rebates of $750 for installations of electric vehicle chargers in homes, as well as 75% of the charging station cost for businesses and 90% for municipalities and First Nation governments.

== Charging stations ==
As of February 2022, there were four public AC level 2 charging stations in Yukon. As of March 2022, there were 12 public DC charging stations in Yukon.
