= Plug-in electric vehicles in British Columbia =

As of 2022, there were about 80,000 electric vehicles in British Columbia. As of September 2022, 17.5% of all new vehicles sold in the province were electric.

== Government policy ==
In 2011, British Columbia announced the LiveSmart BC program which started offering rebates of up to $5,000 per eligible clean energy vehicle commencing on December 1, 2011. The incentives were available until March 31, 2013, or until available funding is depleted, whichever came first. Available funds were enough to provide incentives for approximately 1,370 vehicles. BC had incentives for battery electric vehicles, fuel cell vehicles and plug-in hybrids with battery capacity of 15.0 kWh but paused rebates in May 2025 and as of February 5, 2026 the government confirmed it would not bring back rebates.https://www.biv.com/news/transportation/bc-scraps-provincial-ev-rebates-permanently-amid-federal-renewal-11844186

Effective December 1, 2011, rebates of up to $500 per qualifying electric vehicle charging equipment were available to B.C. residents who had purchased a clean energy vehicle.[3][4]

As of April 2022, the provincial government offers tax rebates of $3,000 for electric vehicle purchases. In 2022, the provincial government stopped collecting sales tax on electric vehicles.

== Charging stations ==
As of 2021, there were about 2,500 public charging stations in British Columbia. There were about 200 public DC charging station locations with 480 charging stations.

== Manufacturing ==
The province has been proposed as a hub for electric vehicle battery recycling.

== Public opinion ==
A poll conducted in 2022 by Research Co. and Glacier Media showed that 59% of residents of British Columbia who drive their own vehicle said that it was "very likely" or "moderately likely" that their next vehicle purchase would be electric.

In a poll conducted in 2022 by BC Hydro, 41% of electric vehicle buyers in British Columbia described the process of buying an electric vehicle as "difficult".

== By region ==
=== Abbotsford–Mission ===
As of 2021, 1.8% of vehicles in Abbotsford and 1.7% of vehicles in Mission were electric.

=== Chilliwack ===
As of 2021, 1.4% of vehicles in Chilliwack were electric.

As of July 2021, there were 20 public AC charging stations and 2 public DC charging stations in Chilliwack.

=== Kamloops ===
As of February 2019, there were 55 electric vehicles registered in Kamloops, equivalent to 0.07% of all vehicles in the city.

=== Kelowna ===
As of 2016, there were 1,017 electric vehicles registered in Kelowna, equivalent to 1.3% of all vehicles in the city.

=== Vancouver ===
As of May 2022, there were 483 public charging station ports in Vancouver.

In March 2018, the Vancouver city council passed a resolution requiring all new residential buildings to install electric vehicle charging infrastructure in 100% of parking spots.

As of March 2022, there were 50 public charging stations in Surrey.

As of 2021, 2.6% of vehicles registered in the Township of Langley were electric.

=== Vancouver Island ===
In a 2022 poll conducted by Research Co., 70% of respondents on Vancouver Island said that electric vehicles were "too expensive" compared to non-electric vehicles.

==== Victoria ====
As of 2020, 13% of new cars sold in Victoria were electric.

=== Vernon ===
As of April 2021, there were three electric vehicles in the Vernon municipal fleet.
