= Plug-in electric vehicles in Prince Edward Island =

As of 2021, there were 494 electric vehicles registered in Prince Edward Island. As of March 2022, 8.4% of new cars sold in Prince Edward Island were electric.

== Government policy ==
As of March 2022, the provincial government offers tax rebates of $5,000 for new electric vehicle purchases.

== Charging stations ==
The first public DC charging stations in Prince Edward Island opened in late 2019.

== By region ==
=== Charlottetown ===
As of 2022, there were 19 public charging stations in Charlottetown.

=== Summerside ===
As of June 2021, Summerside has the largest number of charging station per capita in Canada.
