= Plug-in electric vehicles in Alberta =

As of March 2021, there were about 3,500 electric vehicles registered in Alberta, equivalent to about 0.1% of all vehicles in the province. As of 2022, around 2.3% of new cars sold in Alberta were electric.

== Government policy ==
As of May 2022, the provincial government does not offer any tax incentives for electric vehicle purchases.

== Charging stations ==
As of January 2022, there were 255 public charging stations in Alberta.

== Public opinion ==
In a poll conducted in 2021 by KPMG, 54% of Albertans said it was "likely" or "very likely" that their next vehicle purchase would be electric.

In a 2022 poll conducted by the Alberta Motor Association, 27% of respondents were interested in buying an electric vehicle.

== By region ==
=== Calgary ===
As of August 2021, there were about 3,000 electric vehicles in Calgary. As of January 2022, there were about 200 public charging stations in the city.

In a 2022 poll conducted by the Alberta Motor Association, 31% of respondents in Calgary were interested in buying an electric vehicle.

=== Edmonton ===
As of September 2022, there were 60 electric buses in the Edmonton city fleet.

=== Lethbridge ===
In a 2022 poll conducted by the Alberta Motor Association, 30% of respondents in Lethbridge were interested in buying an electric vehicle.

=== Medicine Hat ===
As of June 2021, there were eight electric vehicles in the Medicine Hat municipal fleet.

=== Red Deer ===
As of 2019, there was one public DC charging station in Red Deer.

The first electric vehicle in the Red Deer County fleet was introduced in November 2022.

=== Wood Buffalo ===
As of December 2022, there were no public DC charging stations in the Regional Municipality of Wood Buffalo.
