= Plug-in electric vehicles in Quebec =

As of March 2022

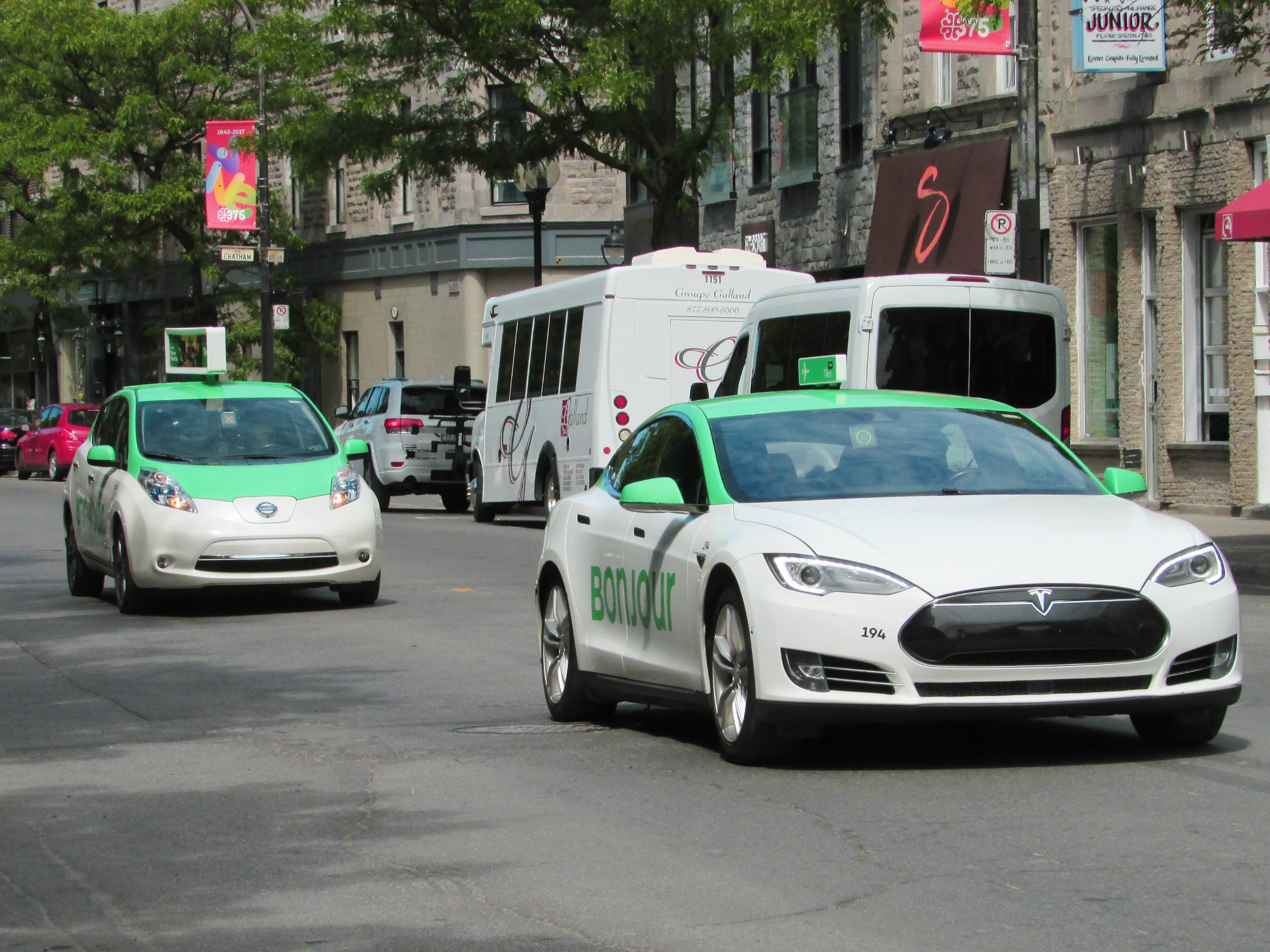
Bonjour electric taxis in Montreal, Quebec, Canada.

, there were about 76,000 fully electric vehicles and 57,000 plug-in hybrid vehicles in Quebec. As of 2021, about 6.8% of new vehicle registrations in Quebec were electric.

== Government policy ==
Quebec began offering rebates of up to $8,000 beginning on January 1, 2012, for the purchase of new plug-in electric vehicles equipped with a minimum of 4 kWh battery, and new hybrid electric vehicles are eligible for a $1,000 rebate. All-electric vehicles with high-capacity battery packs were eligible for the full $8,000 rebate, and incentives were reduced for low-range electric cars and plug-in hybrids. Quebec's government earmarked $50 million for the program, and the maximum rebate amount was set to be slowly reduced every year until a maximum of $3,000 in 2015, but the rebates would continue until the fund runs out. There was also a ceiling for the maximum number of eligible vehicles: 10,000 for all-electric vehicles and plug-in hybrids, and 5,000 for conventional hybrids.

In November 2013, the provincial government announced its decision to earmark in 2014 an additional $65 million to fund a three-year extension to the electric-vehicle rebate program. The maximum rebate was kept at $8,000, but a graded scale was introduced in order to spread the incentive over 10,000 or more vehicles. Quebec's government also set the goal to deploy 12,500 more electric vehicles in the province by 2017, consisting of 10,200 consumer cars, 325 taxis, and 2,000 government-fleet vehicles. Also, incentives were issued for "greening" 525 taxis, aimed to introduce 325 plug-in vehicles (275 plug-in hybrids and 50 all-electrics) and 200 conventional hybrids. The purchase incentives start at $20,000 for battery-electric taxis, $12,000 for plug-in hybrids, and $3,000 for conventional hybrids, with the rebate declining over time. The province planned to also subsidize the deployment of charging stations for taxis.

In October 2016, the National Assembly of Quebec passed a new zero emission vehicle legislation that obliges any carmaker who sells in the Canadian province more than 4,500 new vehicles per year over a three-year average, to offer their customers a minimum number of plug-in hybrid and all-electric models. Under the new law, 3.5% of the total number of autos sold by carmakers in Quebec have to be zero emissions vehicles (ZEV) starting in 2018, rising to 15.5% in 2020. A tradable credit system was created for those carmakers not fulfilling their quotas to avoid financial penalties. The quotas will be determined by Quebec's Ministry of Sustainable Development. Quebec became the first Canadian province to pass such legislation, joining ten U.S. states, including California, that have similar ZEV laws.

As of 1 April 2022, the provincial government offers tax rebates of $7,000 for purchases of electric vehicles, $5,000 for plug-in hybrid vehicles, and $3,500 for used electric vehicles.

As of 2022, the province is legally required to ensure that 17.5% of new vehicles sold in the province by 2025 are electric, 77.5% by 2030, and 100% by 2035.

== Charging stations ==
As of 2022, there were about 3,400 public charging stations in Quebec.

As of December 2020, about 74% of electric vehicle charging in Quebec occurs in private homes.

== Manufacturing ==
Quebec, along with neighboring Ontario, is a major hub for electric vehicle manufacturing in Canada.
