= Dante Park, Montreal =

Montreal park

Dante Park
- Parc Dante
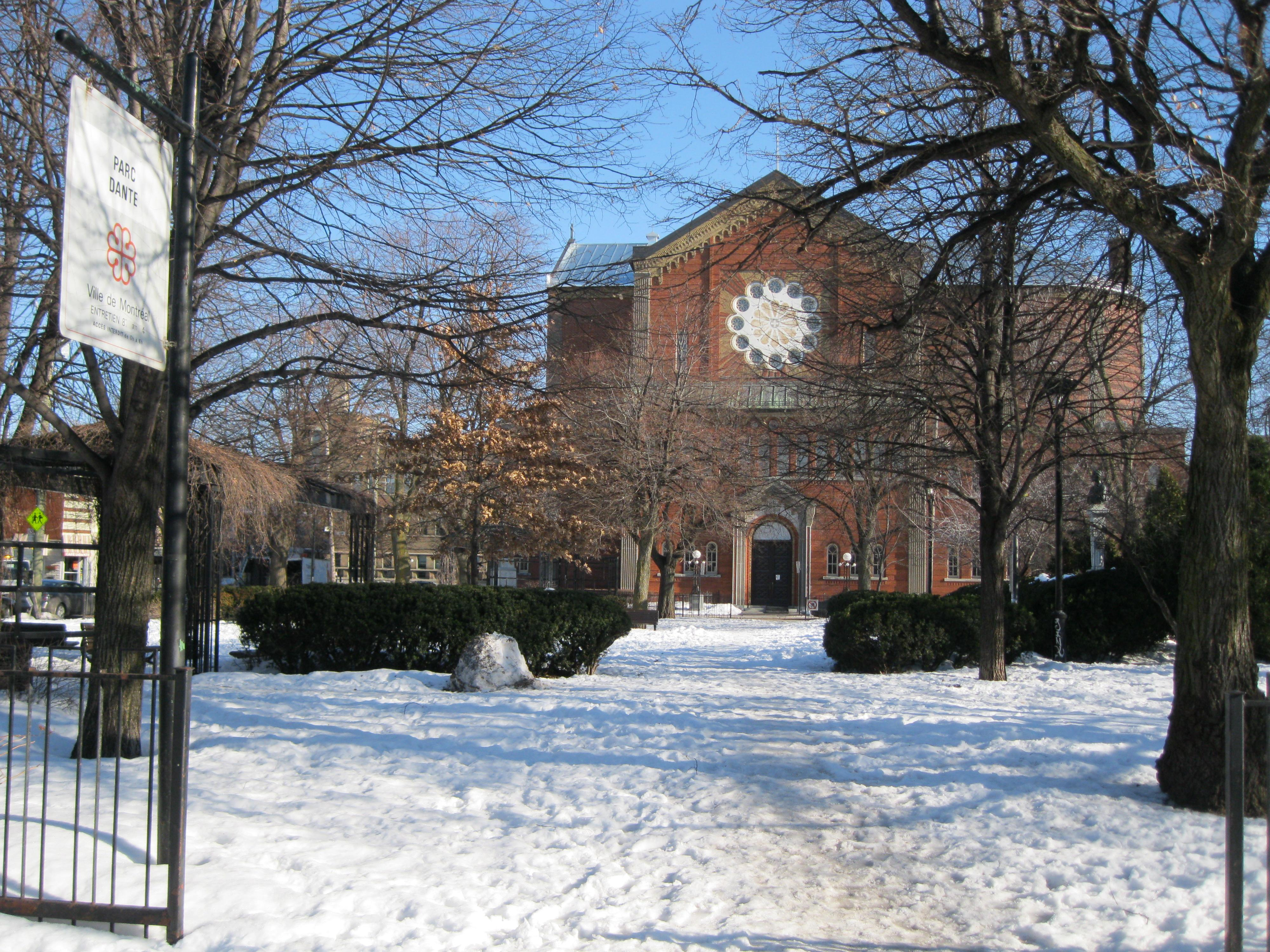

- Location within Montreal
- Type: Urban park
- Location: Little Italy, Rosemont–La Petite-Patrie, Montreal, Quebec, Canada
- Coordinates: 45°32′04″N 73°36′42″W
- Operator: City of Montreal
- Open: 6:00 a.m to 12:00 a.m.
- Status: Open all year
- Website: Parc Dante

Dante Park (French: Parc Dante) is a park in the Little Italy neighbourhood of the Rosemont–La Petite-Patrie borough of Montreal, Quebec, Canada. It covers about one-third of a local city block, bordered by Dante Street to the north, Alma Street to the east, residential buildings to the south, and de Gaspe Street to the west.

The park was inaugurated on June 26, 1963, to celebrate the 50th anniversary of the predominantly Italian Canadian parish of the Church of the Madonna della Difesa. It is located opposite the church.

Dante Park was named for Dante Street, which itself was named for Dante Alighieri (1265-1321) a major Italian poet of the Late Middle Ages, who authored Divine Comedy, which is widely considered the most important poem of the Middle Ages and the greatest literary work in the Italian language.

== Art ==
=== La mort de Dante ===
La mort de Dante
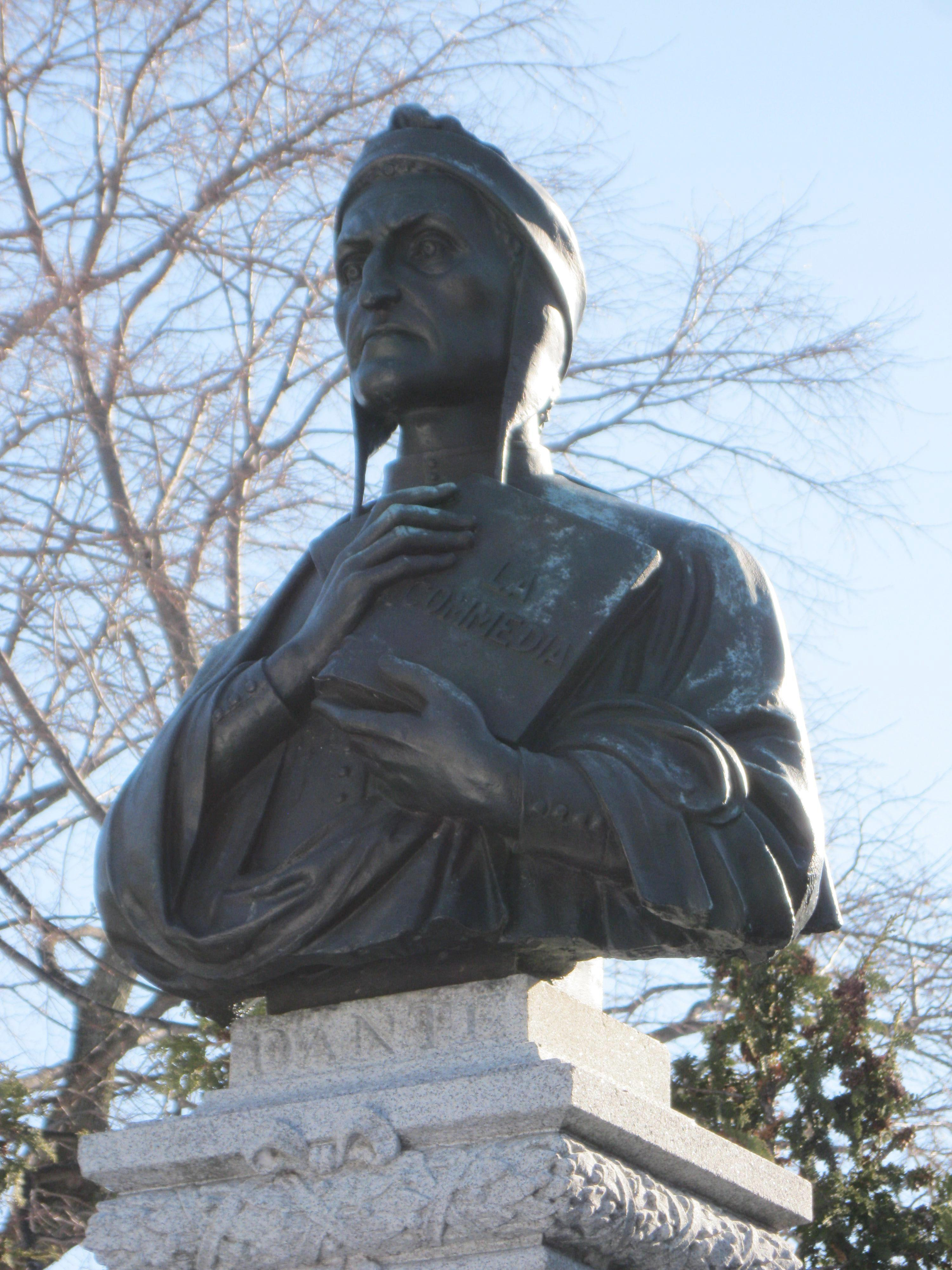
- Interactive map of La mort de Dante
- Location: Dante Park
- Coordinates: 45.5344113°N 73.6117033°W
- Designer: Carlo Balboni
- Type: Monument
- Material: Bronze (sculptural group), Grey granite (pedestal)
- Width: 2.2 metres (7.2 ft)
- Height: 3.6 metres (12 ft)
- Beginning date: 1921
- Opening date: October 22, 1922
- Dedicated to: Dante Alighieri

La mort de Dante (also known as the Dante Monument) is a memorial to Dante Alighieri.

The monument was created by Carlo Balboni (1860-1947) and was unveiled on October 22, 1922, in La Fontaine Park as a gift from Montreal's Italian community to the city. The monument was moved from its original location in La Fontaine Park to Dante Park in 1964.
