= Rosemont–La Petite-Patrie =

- Borough of Montreal
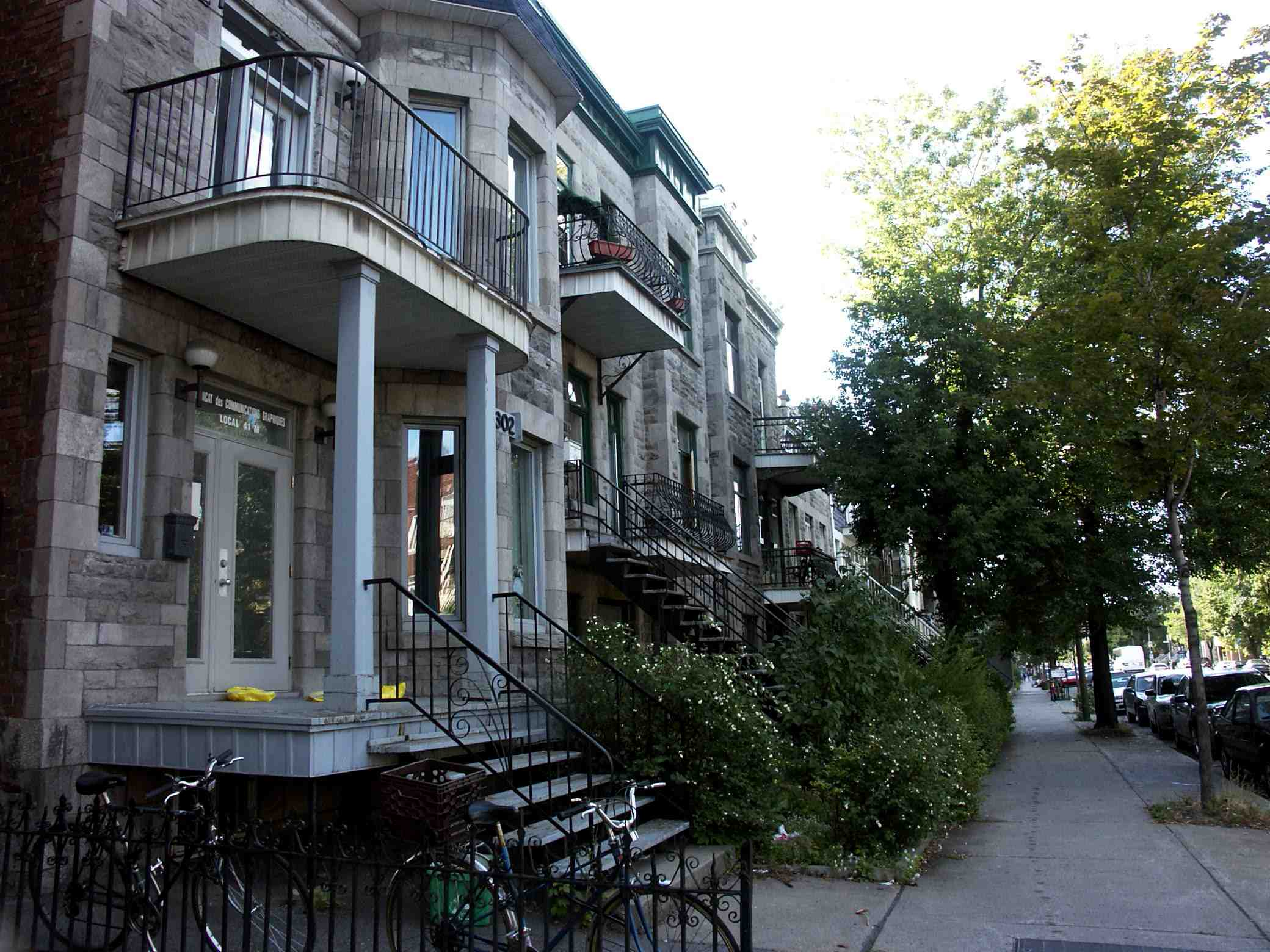
- Saint Denis Street in the Rosemont neighbourhood.

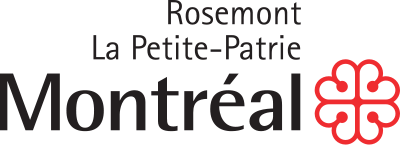

- Rosemont–La Petite-Patrie's location in Montreal
- Coordinates: 45°32′1.4″N 73°36′46.8″W
- Country: Canada
- Province: Quebec
- City: Montreal
- Region: Montréal
- Merge into Montreal: January 1, 2002
- Electoral Districts Federal: Rosemont—La Petite-Patrie; Hochelaga; Outremont
- Provincial: Rosemont; Gouin; Hochelaga-Maisonneuve

Government
  - Type: Borough
  - Mayor: François Limoges (PM)
  - Federal MP(s): Alexandre Boulerice (NDP); Marie-Gabrielle Ménard (LIB); Rachel Bendayan (LIB)
  - Quebec MNA(s): Vincent Marissal (QS); Gabriel Nadeau-Dubois (QS); Alexandre Leduc (QS)

Area
  - Land: 15.9 km^{2} (6.1 sq mi)

Population (2021)
  - Total: 141 813
  - Density: 8,919/km^{2} (23,100/sq mi)
  - Dwellings: 72,910
- Time zone: UTC−5 (Eastern (EST))
  - Summer (DST): UTC−4 (EDT)
- Postal Code: H1T, H1X, H1Y, H2G, H2S
- Area codes: (514) and (438)
- Website: Official website

Rosemont–La Petite-Patrie (French pronunciation: [ʁozmɔ̃ la pətit patʁi]) is a borough (arrondissement) in the city of Montreal, Quebec, Canada. It is located centre-east of the island.

== Geography ==
The borough is bordered to the northwest by Villeray–Saint-Michel–Parc-Extension, to the northeast by Saint Leonard, to the southeast by Mercier—Hochelaga-Maisonneuve, to the southwest by Le Plateau-Mont-Royal and its Mile End neighbourhood, and to the west by Outremont.

It has a population of 141,813 and an area of 15.9 km².

== Government ==
=== Municipal ===
As of the November 2, 2025 Montreal municipal election, the current borough council consists of the following councillors:

District	Position	Name	Party
—	Borough mayor Montreal city councillor	François Limoges	Projet Montréal
Étienne-Desmarteau	City councillor	Ericka Alneus	Projet Montréal
Marie-Victorin	City councillor	Jocelyn Pauzé	Projet Montréal
Saint-Édouard	City councillor	Josefina Blanco	Projet Montréal
Vieux-Rosemont	City councillor	Olivier Demers-Dubé	Projet Montréal

=== Federal and provincial ===
The borough is divided among the following federal ridings:

- Rosemont—La Petite-Patrie, Alexandre Boulerice, NDP
- Hochelaga—Rosemont-Est, Marie-Gabrielle Ménard, Liberal Party of Canada
- Outremont, Rachel Bendayan, Liberal Party of Canada

It is divided among the following provincial electoral districts:

- Gouin, Gabriel Nadeau-Dubois, QS
- Rosemont, Vincent Marissal, QS
- Hochelaga-Maisonneuve, Alexandre Leduc, QS

== Demographics ==
Historical populations
Year	Pop.	±%
1966	186,058	—
1971	173,410	−6.8%
1976	153,833	−11.3%
1981	137,801	−10.4%
1986	133,237	−3.3%
1991	132,636	−0.5%
1996	129,417	−2.4%
2001	131,318	+1.5%
2006	133,618	+1.8%
2011	134,038	+0.3%
2016	139,590	+4.1%
2021	141,813	+1.6%

Home language (2016)
Language	Population	Percentage (%)
French	108,170	83%
English	8,085	6%
Other languages	13,375	10%

Mother Tongue (2016)
Language	Population	Percentage (%)
French	101,675	76%
English	5,720	4%
Other languages	25,995	20%

Visible Minorities (2016)
Ethnicity	Population	Percentage (%)
Not a visible minority	110,125	80.8%
Visible minorities	26,100	19.2%

== Features ==
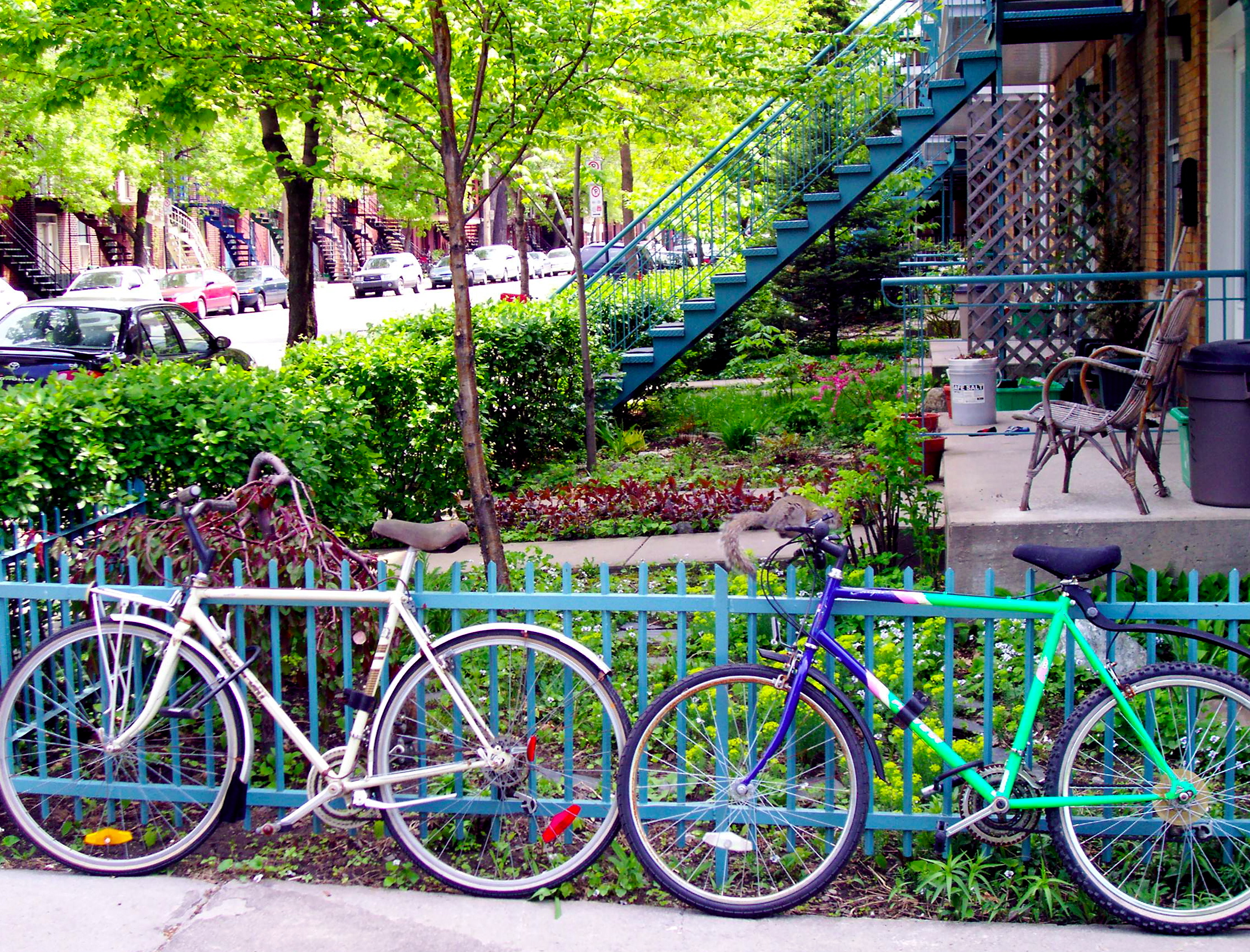
Rue St. Dominique, south of St. Zotique, May 2007.

The northwestern area of the borough is served by the orange and blue lines of the Montreal Metro. Major thoroughfares include Beaubien St., Rosemont Blvd., Masson St., Saint Laurent Blvd., Saint Hubert St., Papineau Ave., Pie-IX Blvd., and Viau St. The notorious Tunnel de la mort is located in that borough, at the intersection of Iberville St. and Saint-Joseph Blvd.

The borough includes the neighbourhoods of the Petite Patrie, comprising several "ethnic" neighbourhoods such as Little Italy; Rosemont; and Nouveau Rosemont.

Important features of the borough include the Jean-Talon Market, the Montreal Heart Institute, the Hôpital Santa Cabrini, the Hôpital Maisonneuve-Rosemont, the Olympic Village, Maisonneuve Park (including the Insectarium and Montreal Botanical Garden), Saint Sophie Ukrainian Orthodox Cathedral, the Church of the Madonna della Difesa and Dante Park.

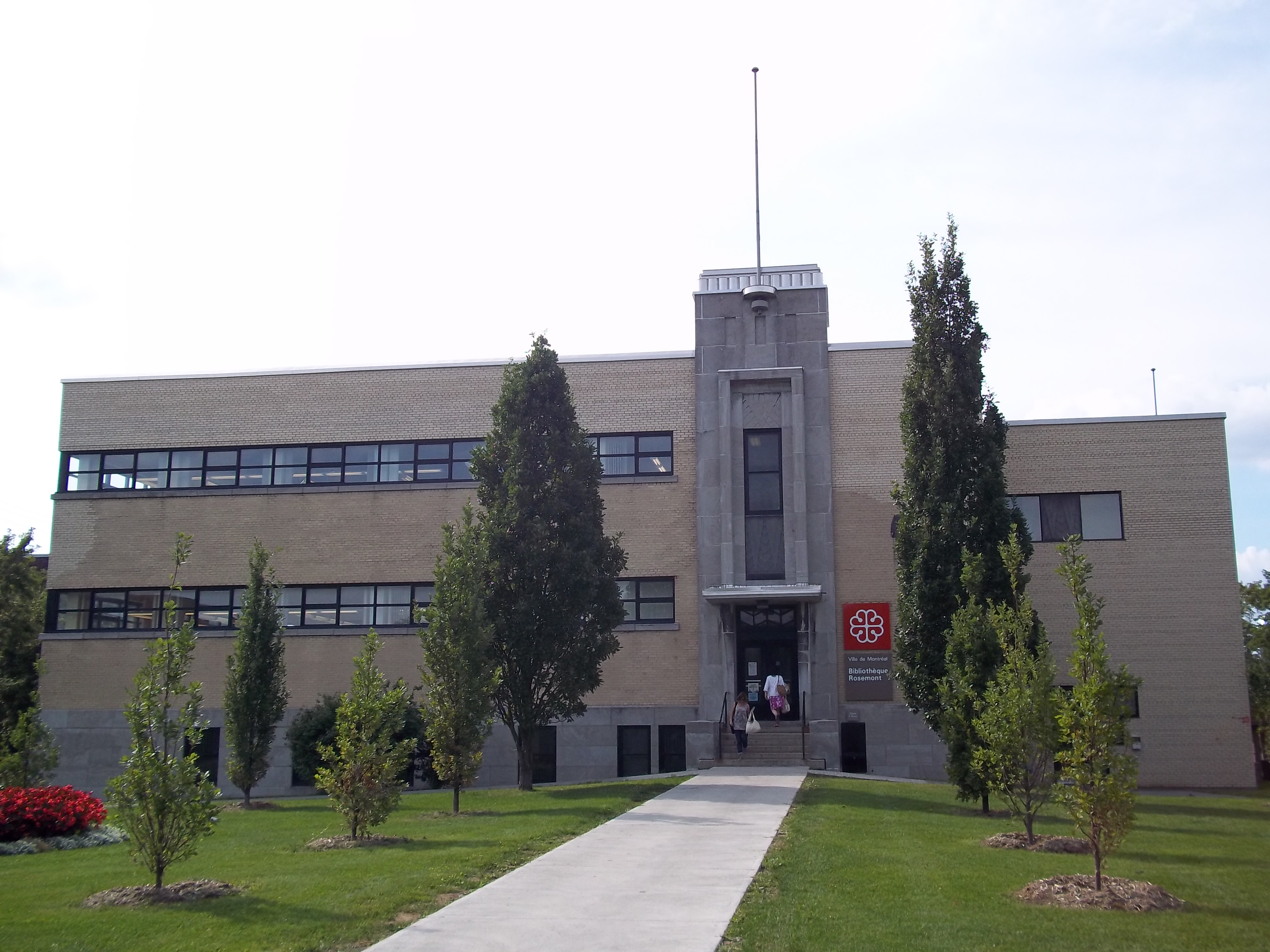
Rosemont Library

The Montreal Public Libraries Network operates the Rosemont, Marc-Favreau and La Petite-Patrie libraries.

== Education ==
The Centre de services scolaire de Montréal (CSSDM) operates French-language public schools.

The English Montreal School Board (EMSB) operates English-language schools.

=== Elementary ===
- Nesbitt Elementary School
- Pierre Elliott Trudeau Elementary School

=== High school ===
- Rosemount High School
- Vincent Massey Collegiate

=== Specialized ===
- Rosemount Technology Centre

== See also ==
- Boroughs of Montreal
- Districts of Montreal
- List of hospitals in Montreal
- Municipal reorganization in Quebec
- Saint-Esprit-de-Rosemont Church
