= Santa Cabrini Hospital =

Hospital in Montreal

Santa Cabrini Hospital Hôpital Santa Cabrini Ospedale
- CIUSSS de l'Est-de-l’Île-de-Montréal
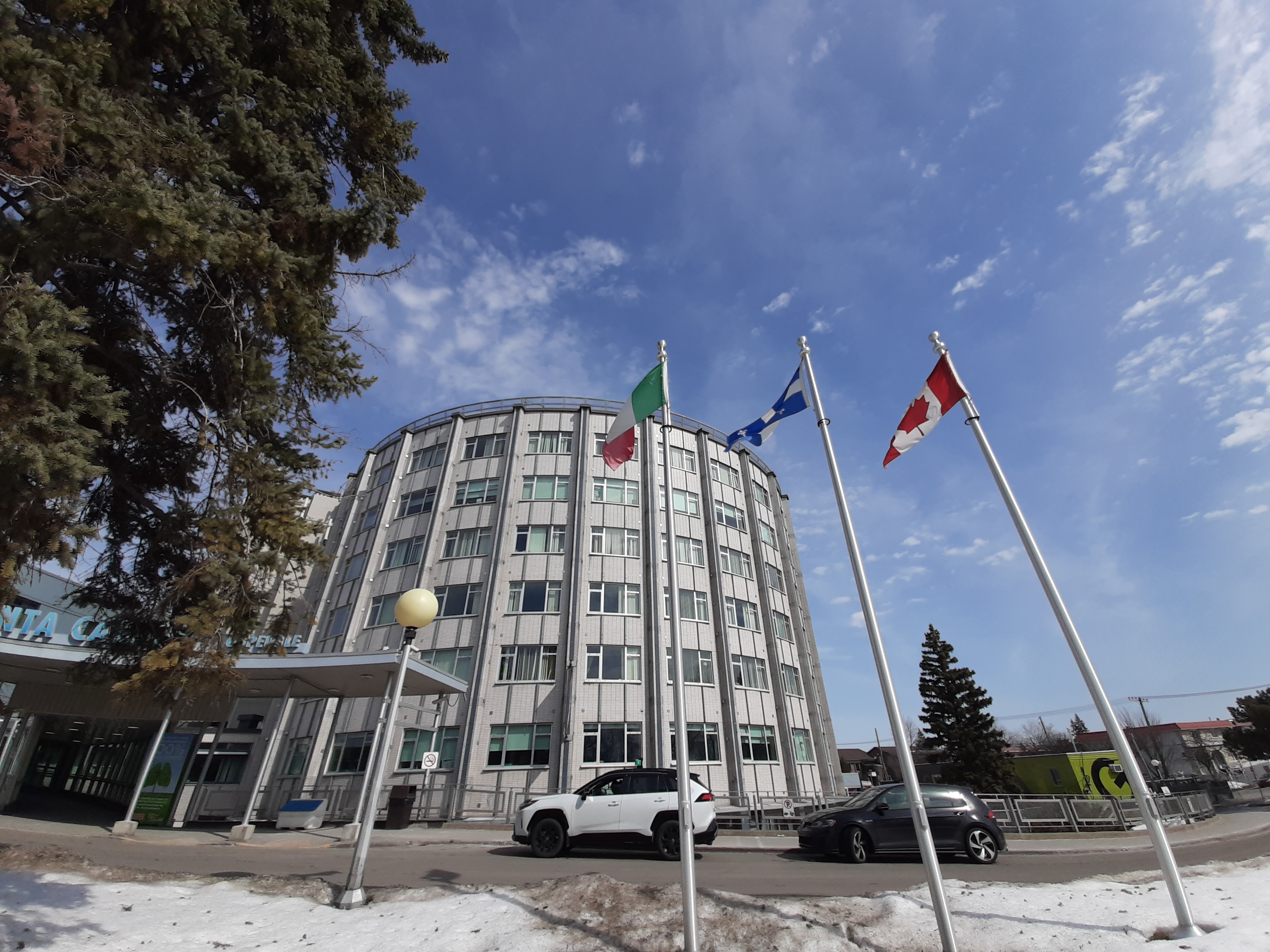
- Entrance of hospital with flags of Italy, Quebec, and Canada

- Location in Montreal

Geography
- Location: 5655 rue Saint-Zotique Est; Montreal, Quebec, Canada
- Coordinates: 45.58018737787627°N 73.57168002971281°W

Organization
- Care system: RAMQ (Quebec Health Insurance Board)
- Type: General

Services
- Beds: 369

History
- Founded: 1960

Links
- Website: ciusss-estmtl.gouv.qc.ca

The Santa Cabrini Hospital (French: Hôpital Santa Cabrini, Italian: Ospedale Santa Cabrini) is a healthcare facility in Montreal, Quebec, Canada. Founded in 1960 under the direction of the Missionary Sisters of the Sacred Heart of Jesus, a Catholic religious order associated with the Italian-American saint, Frances Xavier Cabrini, it is located in Montreal's Little Italy and caters towards the historic Italian immigrant community.

== History ==
The population of Italian immigrants in Montreal rose dramatically following the Second World War, creating an acute need for health services capable of handling immigrants who spoke neither of the two dominant languages in the city (ie. French and English). To respond to this need, a project for a new hospital was devised under the direction of the Missionary Sisters of the Sacred Heart of Jesus, a Catholic missionary order founded by the patron saint of immigrants, Frances Xavier Cabrini. Known for her considerable charitable efforts to improve the condition of Italian immigrants in the late-19th-century New World, Cabrini was chosen as the namesake for the hospital.

With support from the Maurice Duplessis provincial government, the project went ahead and began construction in 1956. Two architects from New York, along with Montreal's own Franco Consiglio, were selected to design the facility, which was to be located in the Saint-Léonard area, where a large number of Italian immigrants had settled. The plans were innovative in their inclusion of "circular care units," which did not exist in Canada at the time. The hospital was officially inaugurated on June 1, 1961 by Cardinal Paul-Émile Léger.

In 1976, the charitable organization Fondation Santa Cabrini was created in order to help raise funds for the hospital. The brainchild of a Montreal businessman, one of the hospital's leading doctors, and one of the sisters of the missionary order, the organization remains active to this day and is a significant financial contributor to such major projects as, for example, the construction of a new surgical pavilion in 2025.

=== Modern-day ===
In the last quarter of the 20th century, new immigration from Italy to Canada began to slow. At the same time, the existing Italian community was integrating into broader Montreal society, with many becoming proficient trilingual French-English-Italian speakers and dispersing away from Saint-Léonard into surrounding neighbourhoods. Accordingly, the demographic and linguistic profile of the hospital's clientele shifted to reflect the changing composition of the area, whose immigrant population now mostly came from French-speaking North Africa, especially Algeria and Morocco, as well as Haiti and Colombia.

After the reorganization of health and social services in Quebec in 2015, Santa Cabrini Hospital fell under the jurisdiction of the newly-created Centre intégré universitaire de santé et de services sociaux de l'Est-de-l'Île-de-Montréal (CIUSSS de l'Est de l'Île de Montréal).

== Services ==
The Santa Cabrini Hospital offers services in French, English, and Italian, with a focus on linguistically and culturally catering to Montreal's Italian community, who represent 13.5% of the hospital's patients, 45% of its staff, and 50% of its volunteers. It employs around 1,900 people, including 200 doctors. In addition to its main facility, which is equipped with 369 beds, the site includes a long-term care home, CHSLD Dante, which opened in 1981 and has 103 beds.

The hospital offers a wide range of health services, including a secondary trauma centre, a cancer centre, an upper digestive surgery centre, a breast cancer treatment centre, and a bariatric surgery centre. The facility also offers palliative care, as well as services in thoracic surgery, vascular surgery, plastic surgery, hematology, nephrology, and neurology.

Along with the nearby Hôpital Maisonneuve-Rosemont, it is one of the major healthcare facilities in east Montreal, home to over 524,000 people (approximately 26% of the island's population). The facility receives approximately 70,000 annual outpatient clinic visits, 40,000 emergency room visits, and 10,000 hospital admissions.

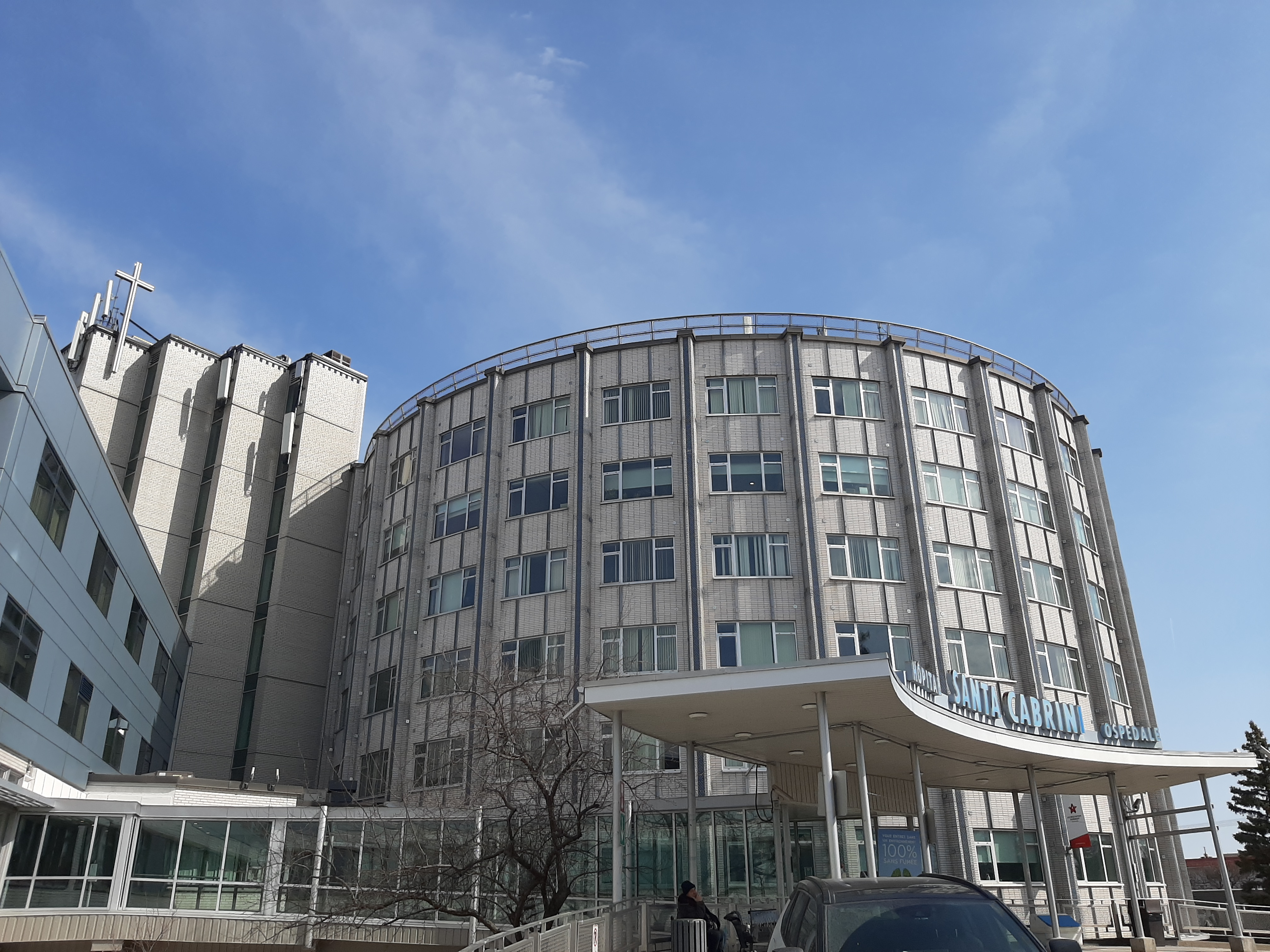
Main entrance of the hospital

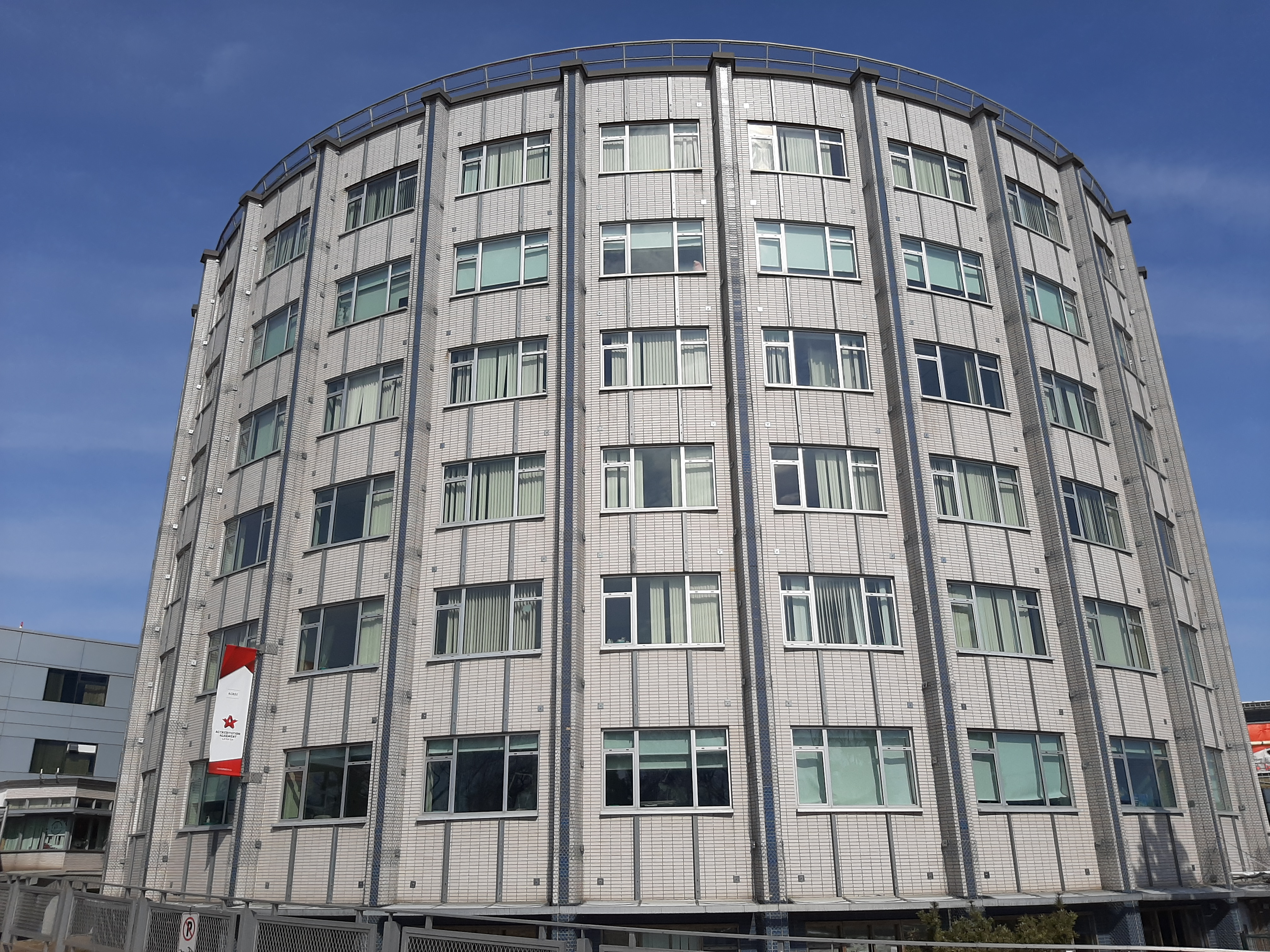
Close-up of the rotunda

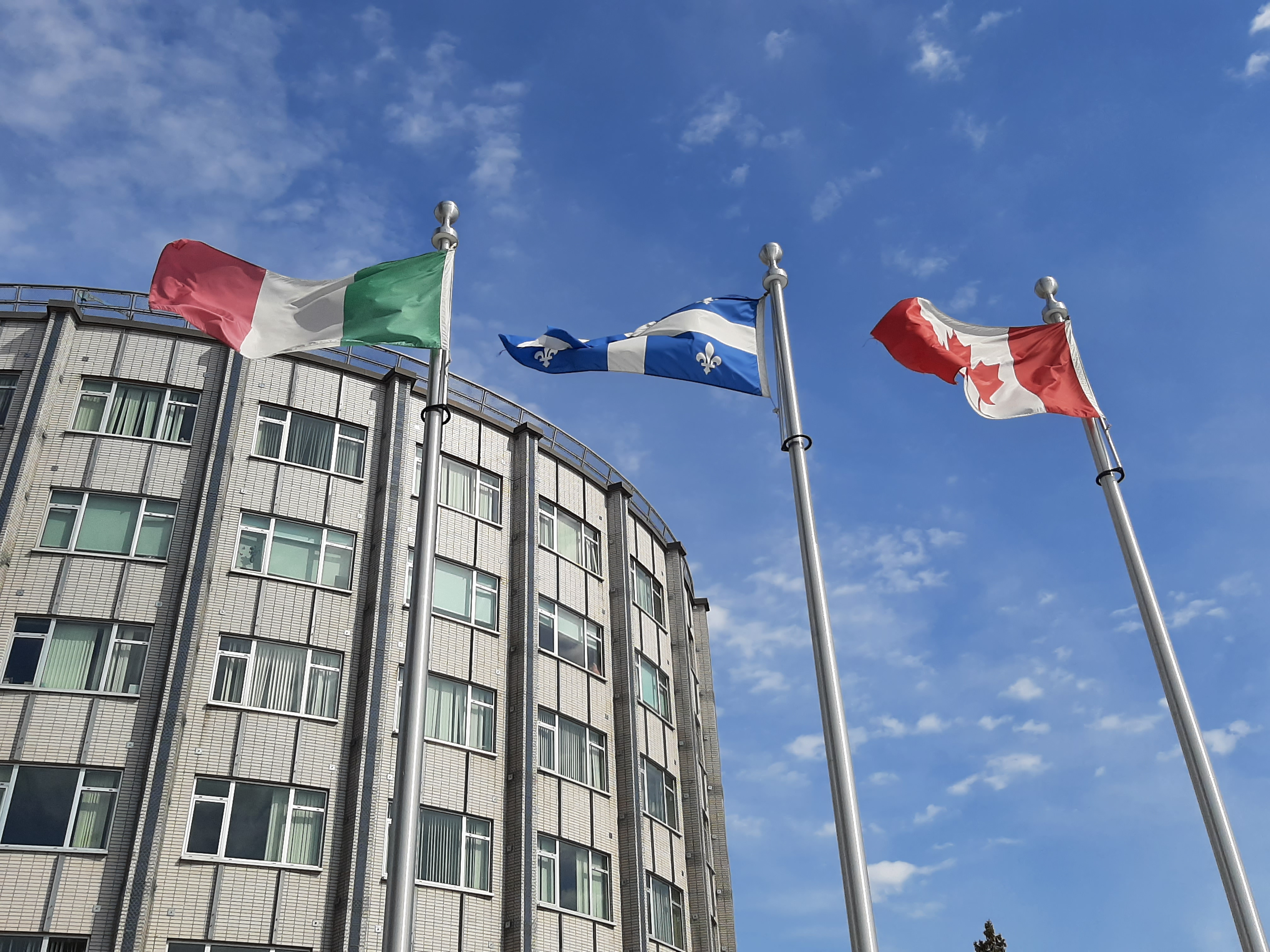
The flags of Italy, Quebec, and Canada at the entrance of the hospital

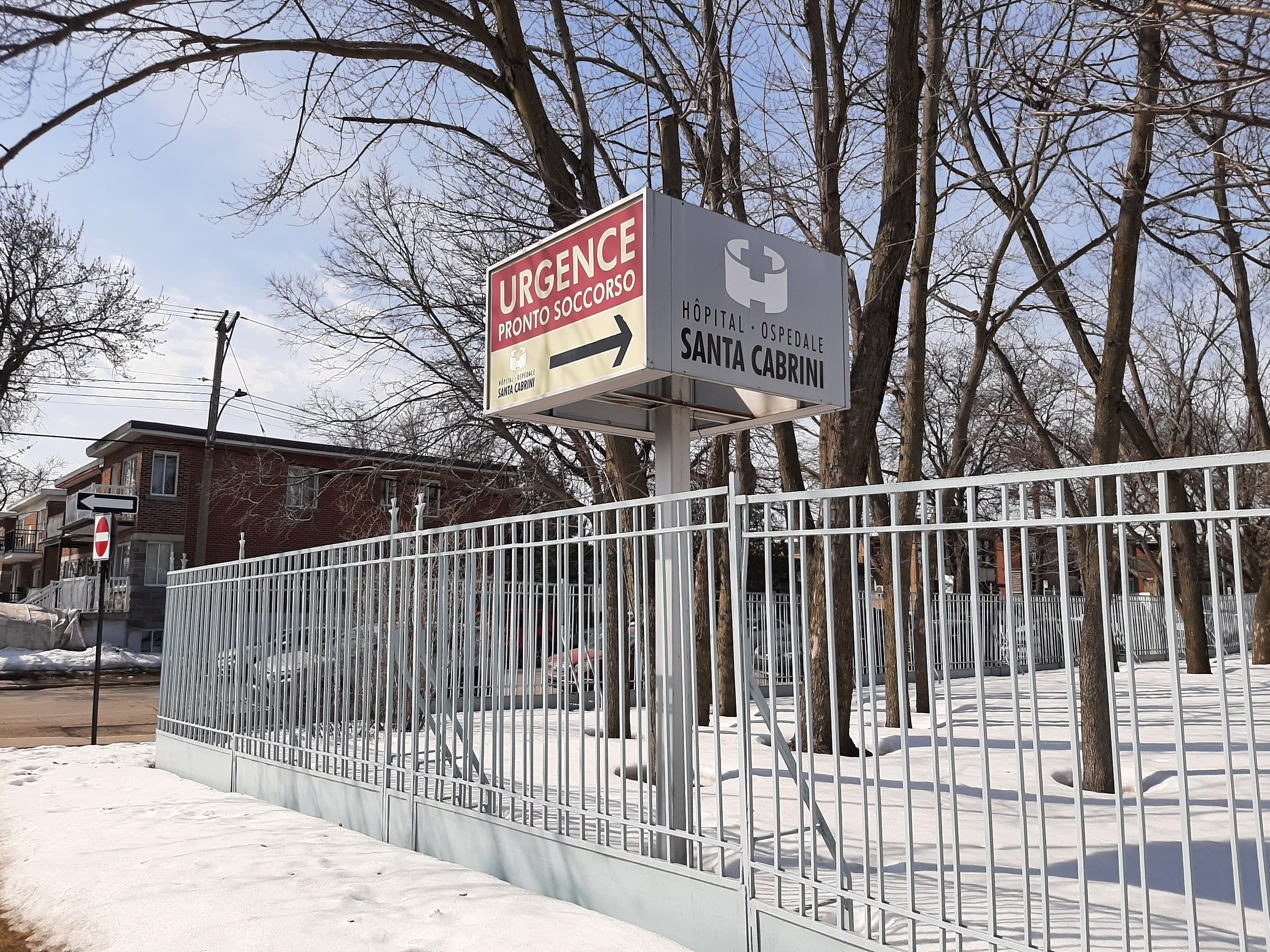
A bilingual sign in Italian and French pointing to the Emergency Room

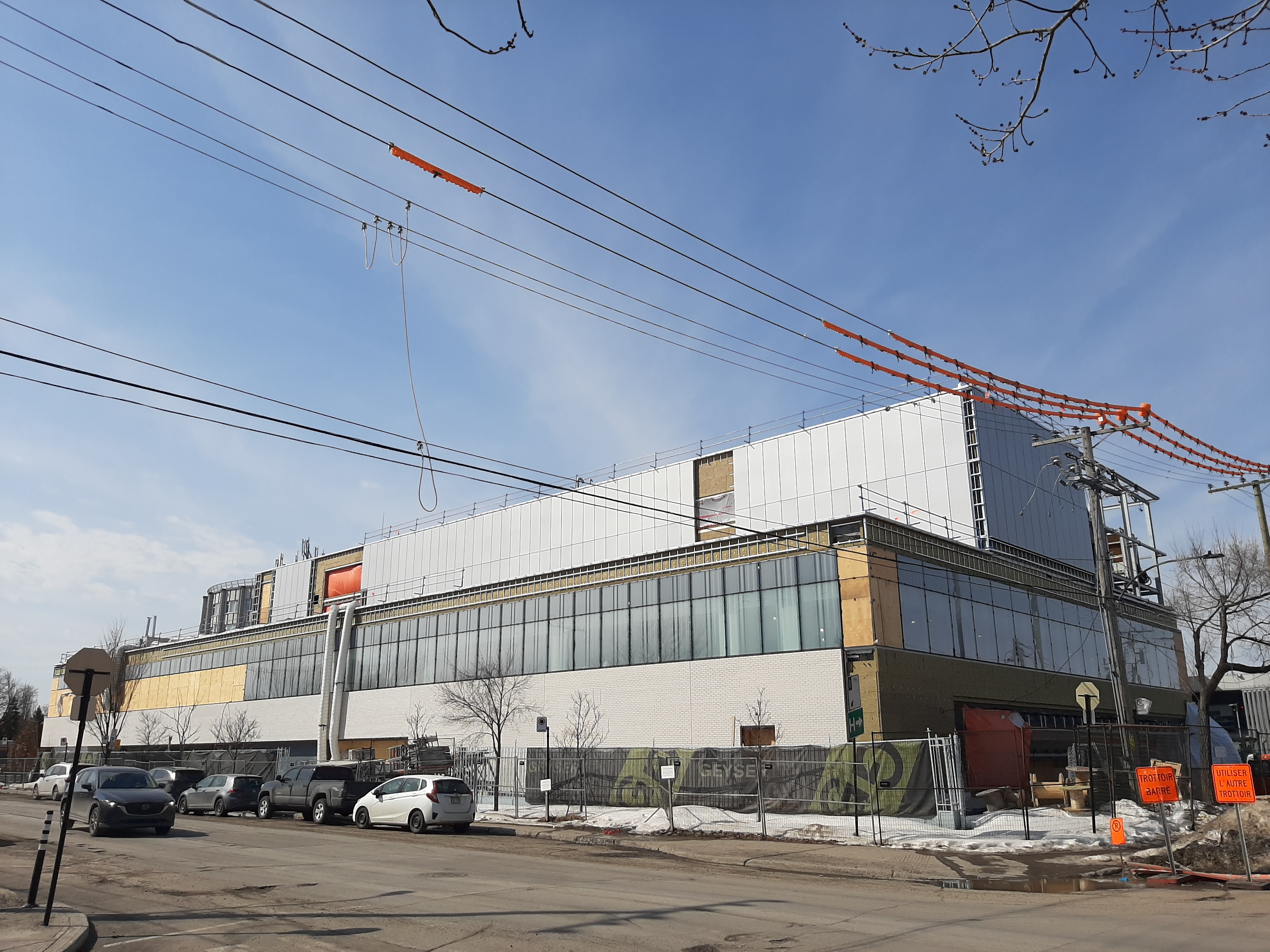
The new surgical pavilion under construction

== Modernization and expansion ==
In 2018, plans for the modernization and expansion of the facility were developed, including:

- A new surgical pavilion with two new operating rooms and three new recovery stretchers.
- A new underground parking lot with 121 spaces.
- Energy efficiency improvements, including the installation of a geothermal energy system and the upgrading of the generator.

Construction began in February 2023 and is expected to be completed in summer 2025. The project is set to cost $139.4 million CAD, with most of the funding coming from the provincial government.
