= Saint-Esprit-de-Rosemont Church =

Coordinates: 45°32′52″N 73°34′31″W

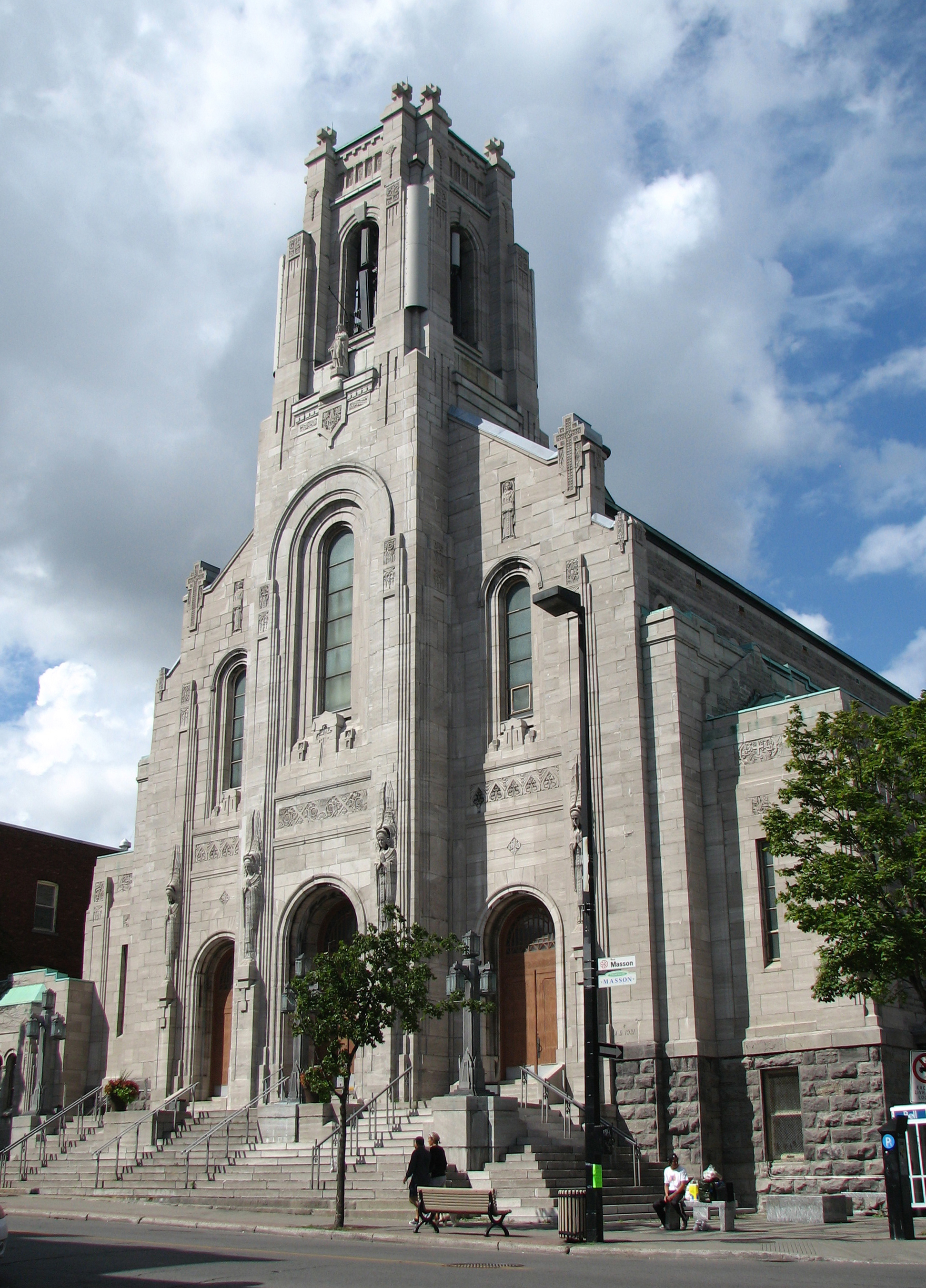
- Saint-Esprit-de-Rosemont Church
- Saint-Esprit-de-Rosemont Church
- Location: 2851, rue Masson; Montreal, Quebec, Canada; H1Y 1X1
- Denomination: Roman Catholic

History
- Former name: Sainte-Philomène Church
- Consecrated: 1933

Architecture
- Functional status: Active
- Architect: Joseph-Égilde-Césaire Daoust,
- Architectural type: Art-deco
- Style: Gothic Revival

Specifications
- Materials: limestone

The Church of the Holy Spirit of Rosemont (French: Église St. Esprit de Rosemont) (formerly the Church of Ste. Philomène), is a Roman Catholic church in the Rosemont–La Petite-Patrie borough of Montreal, Quebec, Canada. Built between 1931 and 1933, it is one of the rare churches with Art-deco architecture. The architect Joseph-Égilde-Césaire Daoust, completed the foundations and basement, 1922–23; and completed the church, 1932-33.

It is situated on Masson Street, in the heart of the Vieux-Rosemont neighborhood.

== History ==
The church was built in two stages, first in 1922-1923 and then in 1931-1933, according to plans by the architect Joseph-Elgide-Césaire Daoust.

Initially, the church possessed a steeple supported by the edges of the square Gothic Revival style bell tower. However, due to explosion of nearby mines, the bell tower was made unstable. Fears that it could collapse led to its removal in 1949. To compensate for this loss, the steeple was replaced with three-dimensional crosses positioned at each corner of the tower, their shape causing them to appear as crosses from all angles.

One of the art-deco style lamps, located on the forecourt of the church, was stolen during the North American ice storm of 1998.

== Characteristics ==
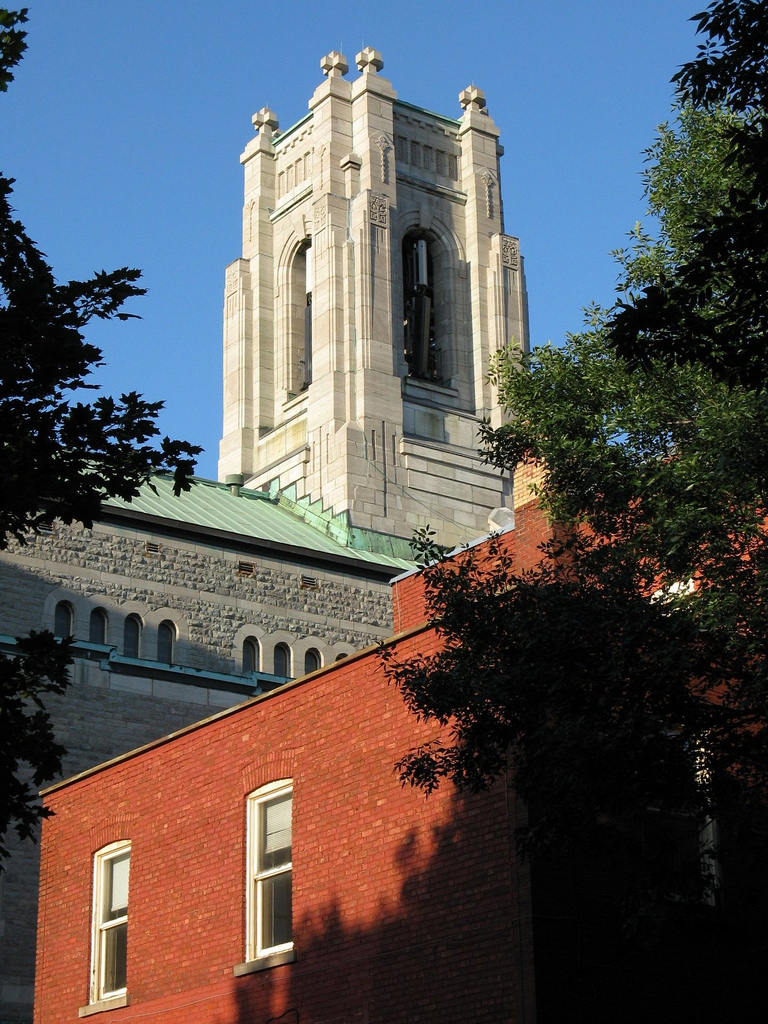
Bell tower and presbytery.

The church has a Casavant Frères organ, which was damaged due to water infiltration in the 1990s, but is almost completely restored now.

It was built with gray limestone from the quarries nearby, onto a Latin cross plan.

The windows are the work of artist Guido Nincheri.

The church has an expansive interior, consisting of a three-aisle nave and semicircular apse. The church’s Art Deco lamps and churchwardens' pews are unique in Québec religious art.
