= Italian Canadians in Greater Montreal =

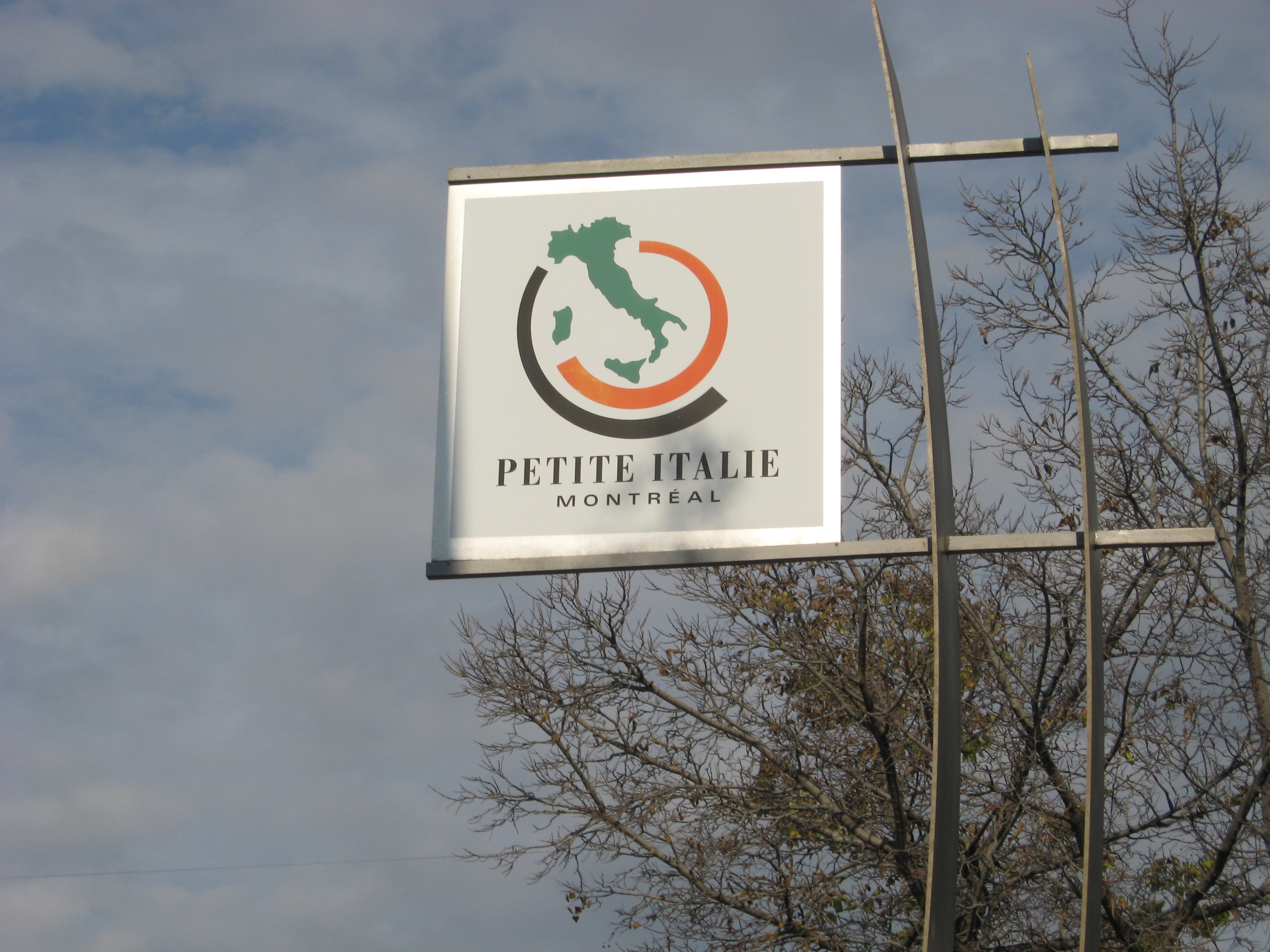
Little Italy

Montreal and its suburbs have a substantial Italian Canadian community. As of 2021, 17.3% of the ethnic Italians in Canada live in Greater Montreal.

Montreal's Italian community is one of the largest in Canada, second only to Toronto. With 267,240 residents of Italian ancestry as of the 2021 census in Greater Montreal, Montreal has many Italian districts, such as La Petite-Italie, Saint-Leonard (Città Italiana), Rivière-des-Prairies, Montreal-Nord, LaSalle, and the Saint-Raymond area of Notre-Dame-de-Grâce. The community has also since spread into Laval and the West Island suburbs. Italian is the third most spoken language in Montreal and in the province of Quebec.

== History ==
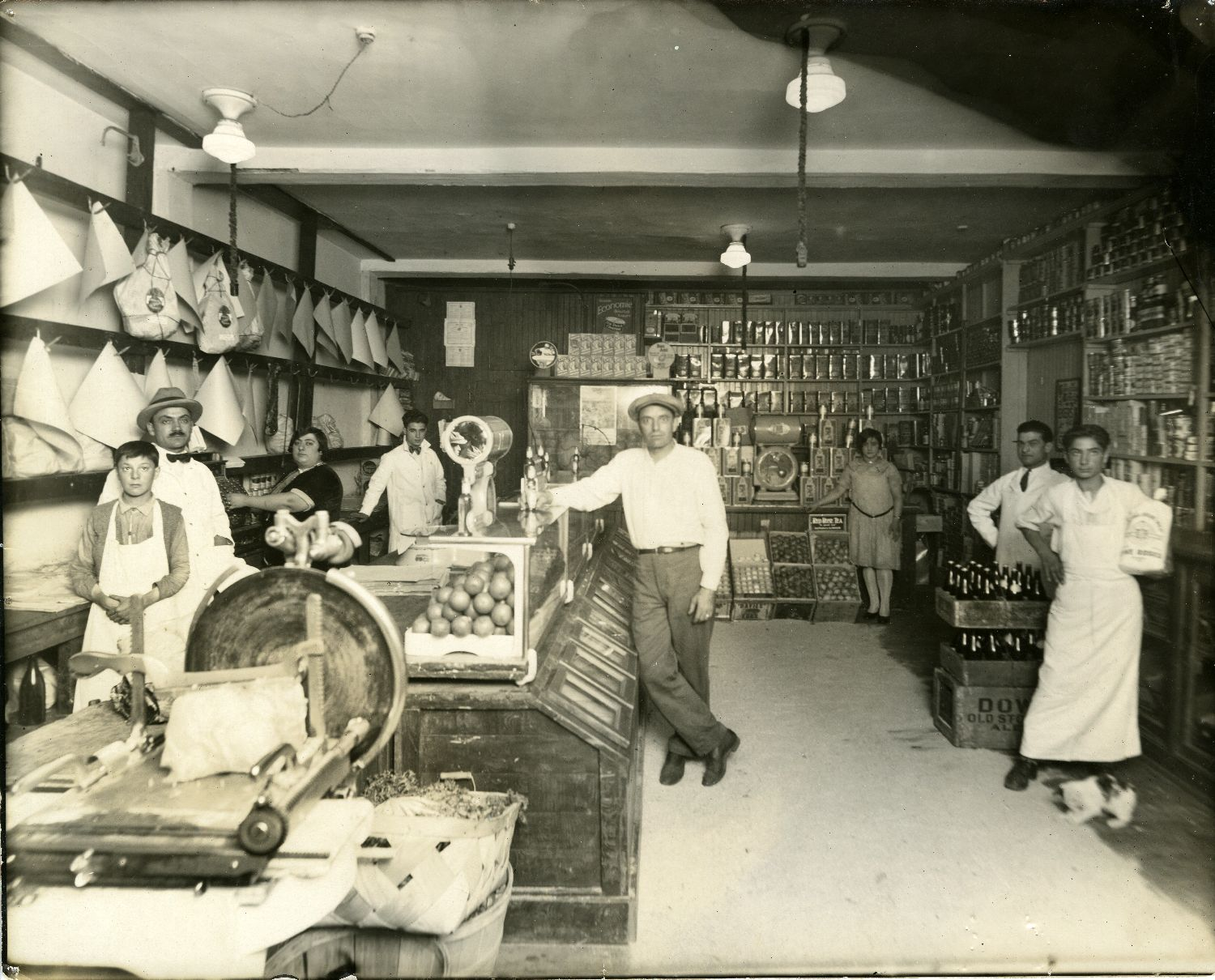
A grocery store owned by an Italian family in Little Italy, 1910s

In 1893, there were about 1,400 ethnic Italians in Montreal. During this time, Italian employment agencies that worked with Canadian steamship and railway companies attracted many Italian labourers to Montreal. Additional growth in the Italian population took place in the 20th century. The 1905, the Royal Commission appointed to Inquire into the Immigration of Italian Labourers to Montreal and alleged Fraudulent Practices of Employment Agencies was launched into deceptive tactics used by padroni, labour brokers who recruited Italian workers for Canadian employers. The commission recommended that the city of Montreal pass a by-law requiring immigration agents and offices to be licensed before being permitted to carry out their business.

The first Catholic church for the Italians became Mount Carmel Parish in 1905. It was established by an Italian-speaking man, Canon Bruchési. In 1911 the second Italian parish opened.

The political unit of the Italian community split after Benito Mussolini became the leader of Italy in the 1920s. During World War II the Canadian government opposed pro-Mussolini elements in the Montreal Italian community.

The Order of the Sons of Italy in Montreal dedicated a statue of the Italian navigator and explorer John Cabot in 1935. The order suggested that Cabot, and not Jacques Cartier, was in fact the first European to reach Canada.

== Demographics ==
In 1931, there were more Italians than people of British origins in St. Jean Ward. During that year, in 19 of Montreal's 35 wards, the Italians were the largest non-French and non-British ethnic group. This was also the case in five other cities and towns in Greater Montreal.

== See also ==
- Demographics of Montreal
- Church of the Madonna della Difesa
- Guido Nincheri
- Il Cittadino Canadese
- Il Duce Canadese
- Via Italia
- Ciao Bella (TV series)
- Mambo Italiano (film)
- 1991 (film)
- Italians in Toronto
- Italian language in Canada

== Notes ==
- Some material originated from Demographics of Montreal#Italians
