= Little Italy, Montreal =

Little Italy
- Neighbourhood
- Petite Italie
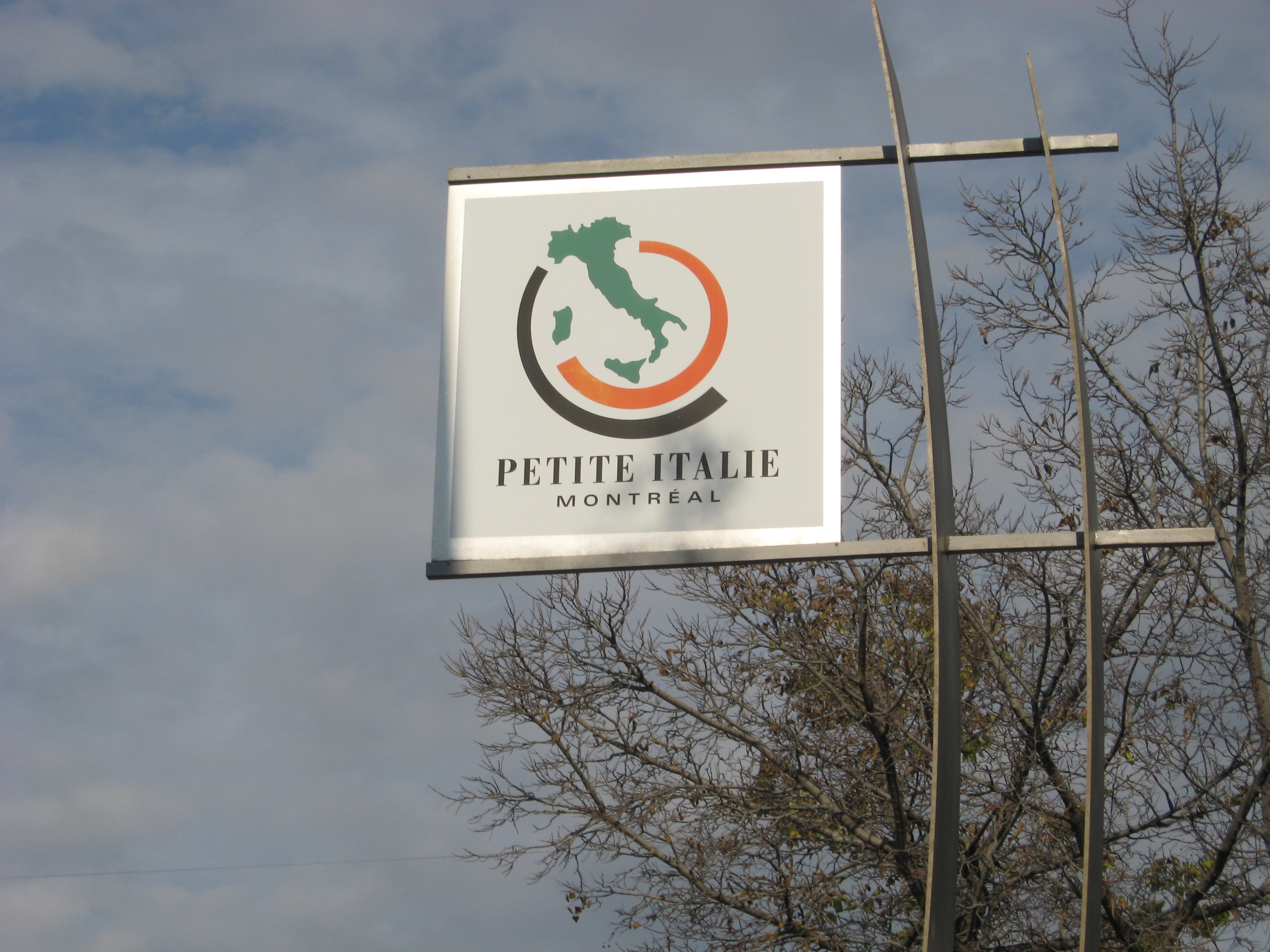
- Little Italy emblem

- Location of Little Italy in Montreal
- Coordinates: 45.531611°N 73.619028°W
- Country: Canada
- Province: Quebec
- City: Montreal
- Borough: Rosemont–La Petite-Patrie
- Postal Code: H2R, H2S
- Area codes: 514, 438

Little Italy (French: Petite-Italie, pronounced [pətit itali]; Italian: Piccola Italia) is a neighbourhood in Montreal, Quebec, Canada. It is centered on Saint Laurent Boulevard between Jean Talon Street and St. Zotique Street in the borough of Rosemont–La Petite-Patrie, south of Villeray and Jarry Park.

Little Italy is home to Italian Canadian-owned shops and restaurants, the Jean-Talon Market, as well as the Church of the Madonna della Difesa, built by Italian immigrants from the Campobasso area in Molise to commemorate the apparition of the Virgin Mary in La Difesa, an area of Campobasso.

Montreal has the second largest Italian population in Canada after Toronto. There are 260,345 people of Italian ancestry living within the Greater Montreal Area.

== History ==
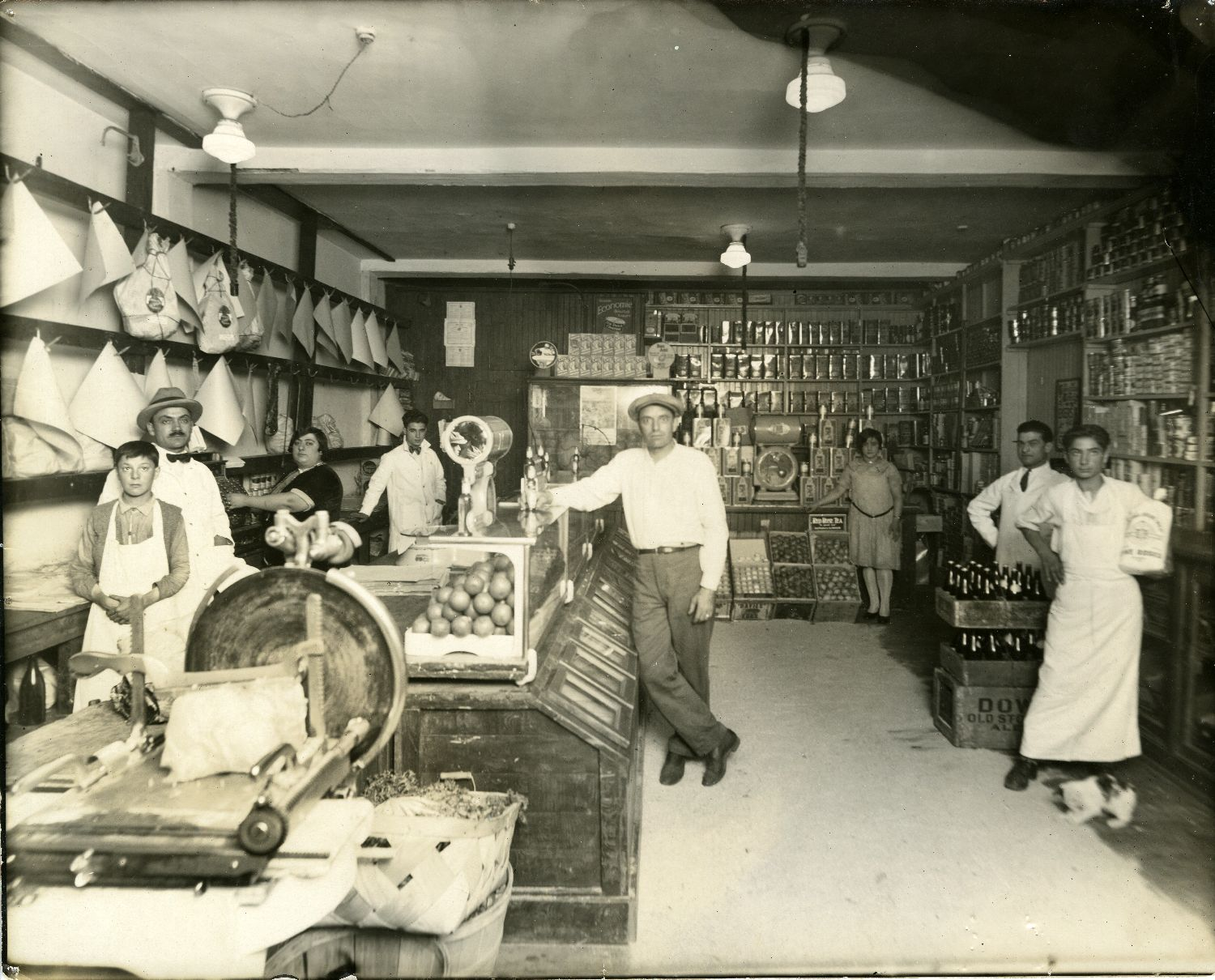
A grocery store in Little Italy, 1910s

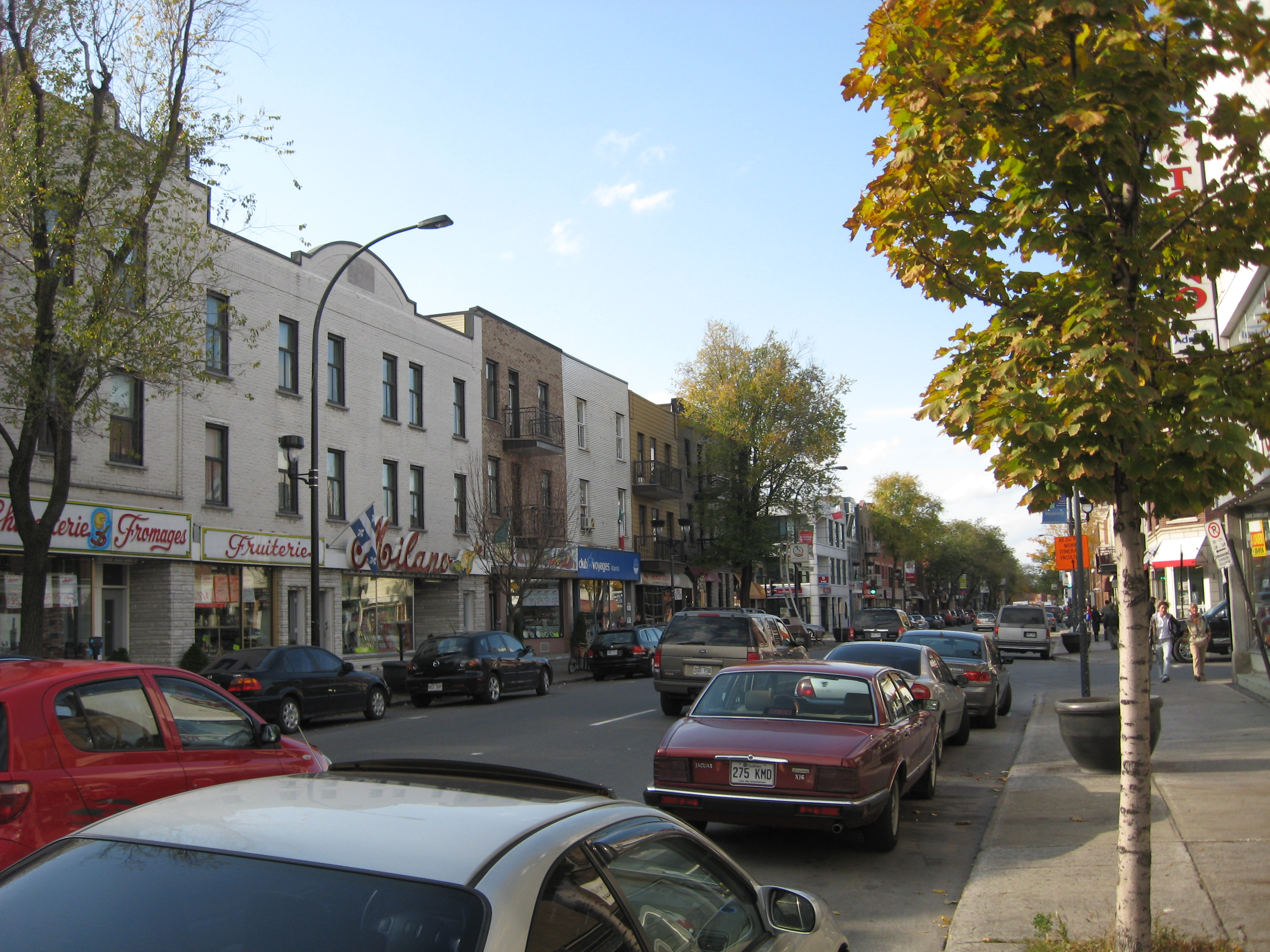
Saint Laurent Boulevard in Little Italy.

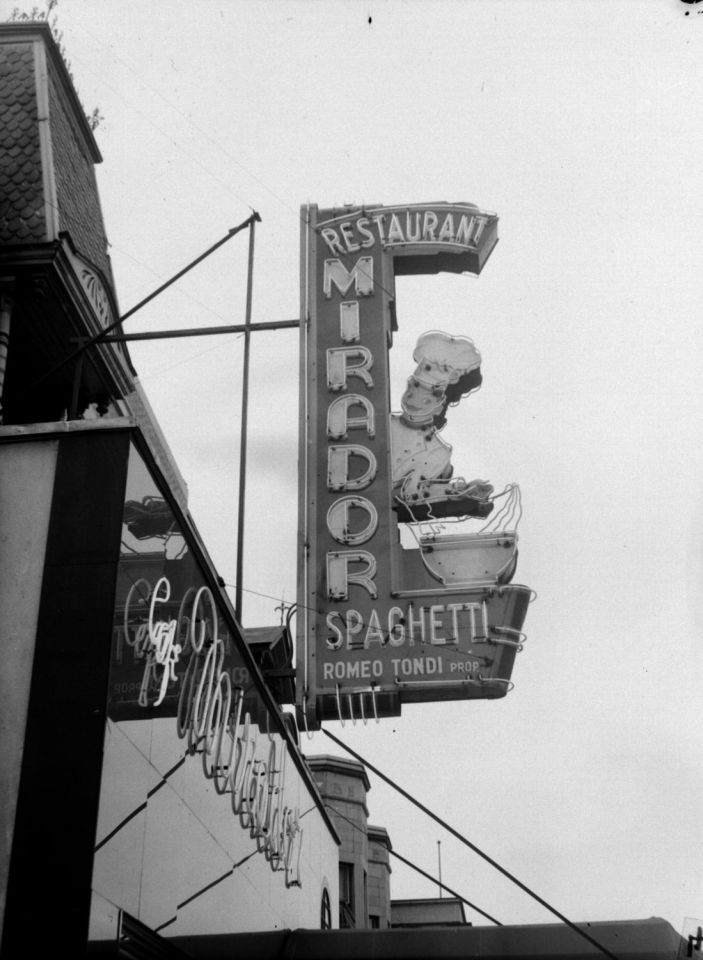
Sign of Mirador, a restaurant in Montreal owned by an Italian immigrant, July 1948

The Italian presence in Quebec dates to the seventeenth century, when Italians from the Piedmont region served in the Carignan-Salières Regiment. There were also a few traders and artisans who came mainly from northern Italy. In the nineteenth century, larger scale Italian immigration began to develop. These immigrants were predominantly male farmers from the southern regions. These immigrants, mostly temporary, worked in railways, mines and lumber camps.

In the early twentieth century, the composition of immigrants began to change. It was then characterized by permanent immigrants and family reunification. The majority of immigrants worked in the construction and maintenance of railways (Canadian Pacific Railway and Grand Trunk Railway). Soon they built their own churches and institutions such as the Church of the Madonna della Difesa.

The largest wave of Italian immigrants arrived with the end of World War II. Between 1946 and 1960, thousands of Italian workers and peasants landed in the Port of Montreal or in the Port of Halifax (famously Pier 21) and proceeded on to Montreal by train (with a majority admitted under the family reunification). A large part of them settled around the Jean Talon Market and the Church of Madonna della Difesa, giving birth to Little Italy.

From 1961 to 1975, immigration had diversified and was characterized by a high proportion of workers in manufacturing and construction. It was after the 1970s that a sharp decline in immigration from Italy occurred.

== Church of the Madonna della Difesa ==
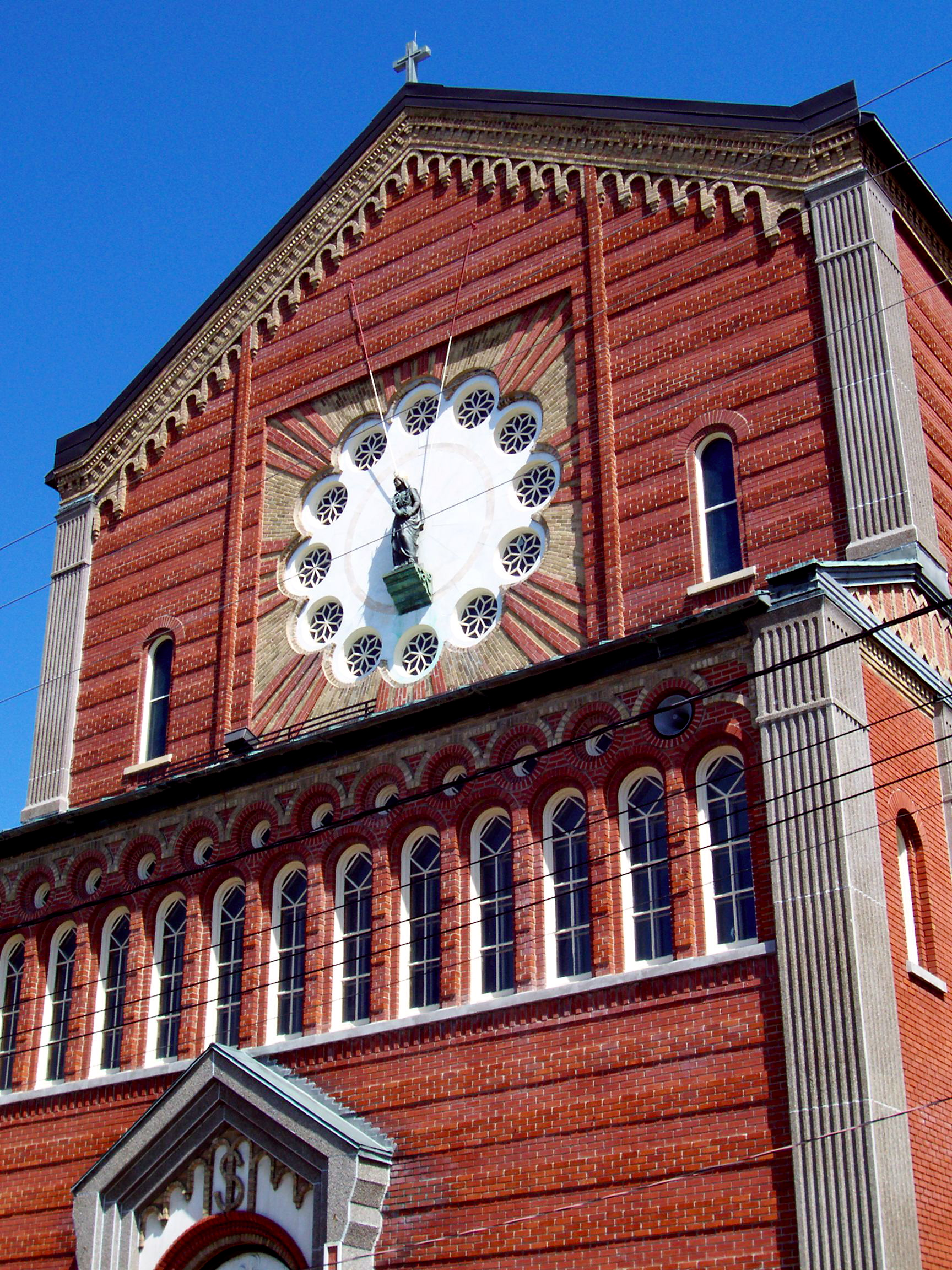
Church of the Madonna della Difesa, a National Historic Site.

The Church of the Madonna della Difesa (French: Église de Notre-Dame-de-la-Défense) was designated as a National Historic Site of Canada in 2002.

Since its construction in 1918, this church has been closely associated with the Italian community in Montreal. The parish was established in the 1860s.

The building and its interior decoration, were made in stages by artist Guido Nincheri, whose work was influenced by the structure of a typical Italian parish church from the Renaissance era. The walls and ceilings are painted in bright coloured frescos.

== Parks ==
- Dante Park is a park in Little Italy, bordered by Dante Street to the north, de Gaspe Street to the west, and Alma Street to the east. The park was inaugurated on June 26, 1963, to celebrate the 50th anniversary of the predominantly Italian Canadian parish of the Church of the Madonna della Difesa. It is located opposite the church.

== Jean-Talon Market ==
The Jean-Talon Market (French: Marché Jean Talon) is a farmer's market located in the heart of the Little Italy. This market opened in 1933 and was named after Jean Talon, the second Intendant of New France. It went through numerous renovations in the early 2000s, resulting in most of the market being sheltered, and there is also underground parking. The main entrance was opened in the summer of 2005.

== See also ==
- Italians in Montreal
- Via Italia
