= Italian Canadians =

Canadian citizens of Italian descent

Italo-Canadiens (French) italocanadesi (Italian)
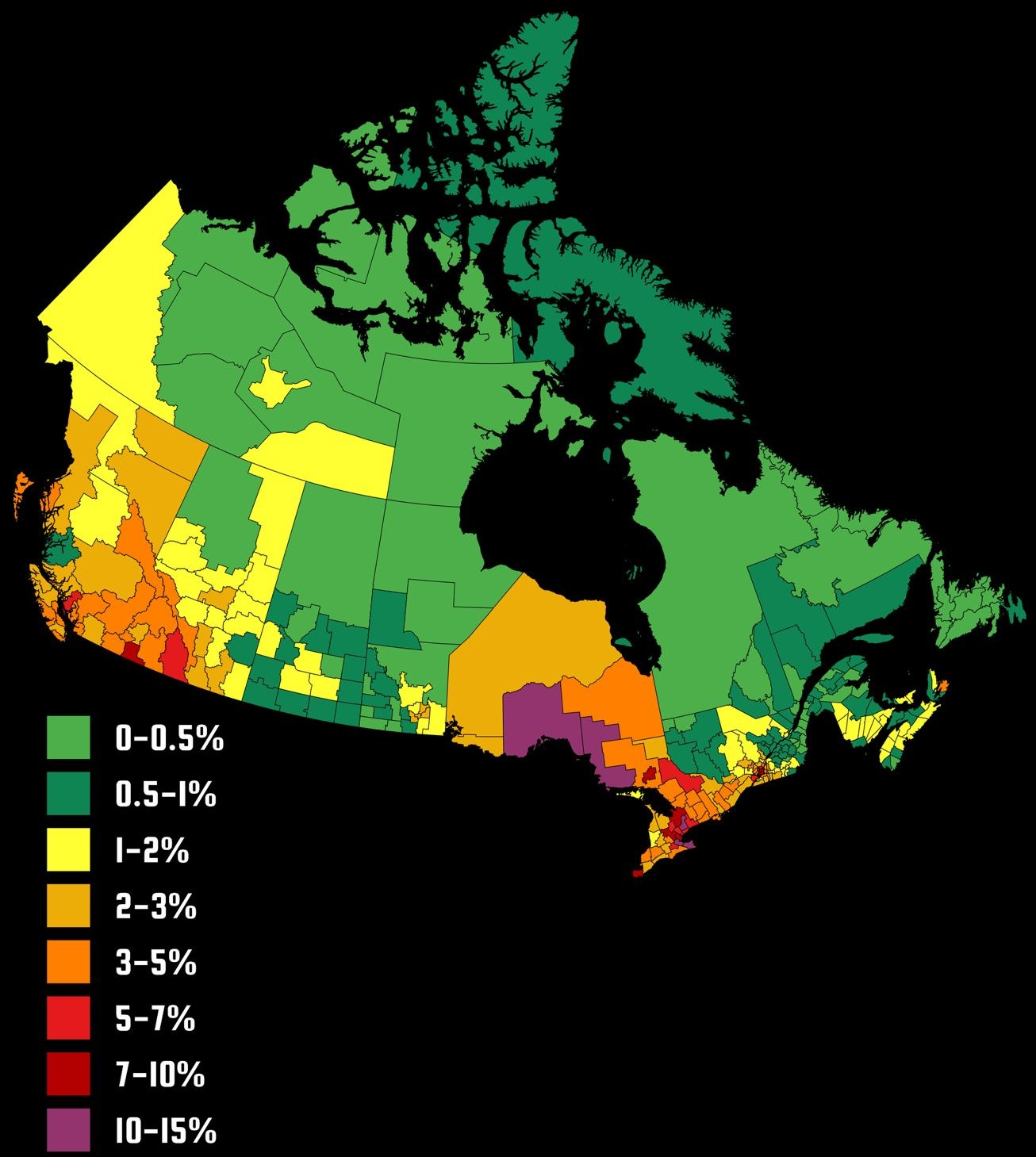
- Italian Canadians as a percent of population by census division

Total population
- 1,546,390 (total population); 204,070 (by birth); 1,342,320 (by ancestry); 2021 Census; 4.3% of Canada's population.

Regions with significant populations
- Greater Toronto Area, Hamilton, Niagara Region, London, Guelph, Windsor, Ottawa–Gatineau, Barrie, Sault Ste. Marie, Greater Sudbury, Thunder Bay, Greater Montreal, Greater Vancouver

Languages
- Canadian English; Canadian French; Italian; Italian dialects; Calabrese; Faetar; Neapolitan; Sicilian

Religion
- Predominately Roman Catholicism

Related ethnic groups
- Other Italians, Sicilian Americans, Corsican Americans

Italian Canadians or Italo-Canadians (French: Italo-Canadiens; Italian: italocanadesi) are Canadian-born citizens who are fully or partially of Italian descent, whose ancestors were Italians who migrated to Canada as part of the Italian diaspora, or Italian-born people in Canada. According to the 2021 Census of Canada, 1,546,390 Canadians (4.3% of the total population) claimed full or partial Italian ancestry. They comprise a subgroup of Southern European Canadians which is a further subgroup of European Canadians. The census enumerates the entire Canadian population, which consists of Canadian citizens (by birth and by naturalization), landed immigrants and non-permanent residents and their families living with them in Canada. Residing mainly in central urban industrial metropolitan areas, Italian Canadians are the seventh largest self-identified ethnic group in Canada behind French, English, Irish, Scottish, German and Chinese Canadians.

Italian immigration to Canada started as early as the mid 19th century. A substantial influx of Italian immigration to Canada began in the early 20th century, primarily from rural southern Italy, with immigrants primarily settling in Toronto and Montreal. During the interwar period after World War I, new immigration laws in the 1920s limited Italian immigration. During World War II, approximately 600 to 700 Italian Canadian men were interned between 1940 and 1943 as potentially dangerous enemy aliens with alleged fascist connections.

A second wave of immigration occurred after the World War II, and between the early 1950s and the mid-1960s, approximately 20,000 to 30,000 Italians immigrated to Canada each year, many of the men working in the construction industry upon settling. Pier 21 in Halifax, Nova Scotia was an influential port of Italian immigration between 1928 until it ceased operations in 1971, where 471,940 individuals came to Canada from Italy, making them the third largest ethnic group to immigrate to Canada during that time period. In the late 1960s, the Italian economy experienced a period of growth and recovery, removing one of the primary incentives for emigration. The importance of the family unit of Italian Canadians has provided a central role in the adaptation of newer socioeconomic realities. In 2010, the Government of Ontario proclaimed the month of June as Italian Heritage Month, and in 2017, the Government of Canada also declared the month of June as Italian Heritage Month across Canada.

== History ==
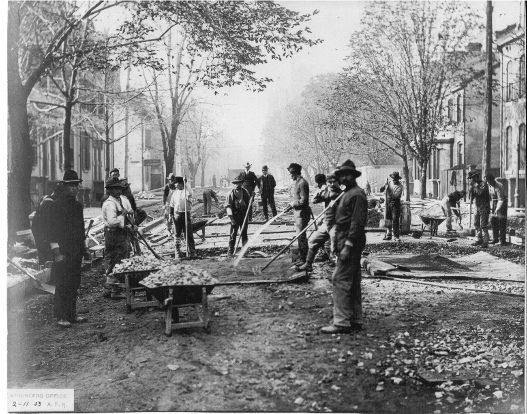
Italian immigrants lay cobblestones on King Street in Toronto, 1903

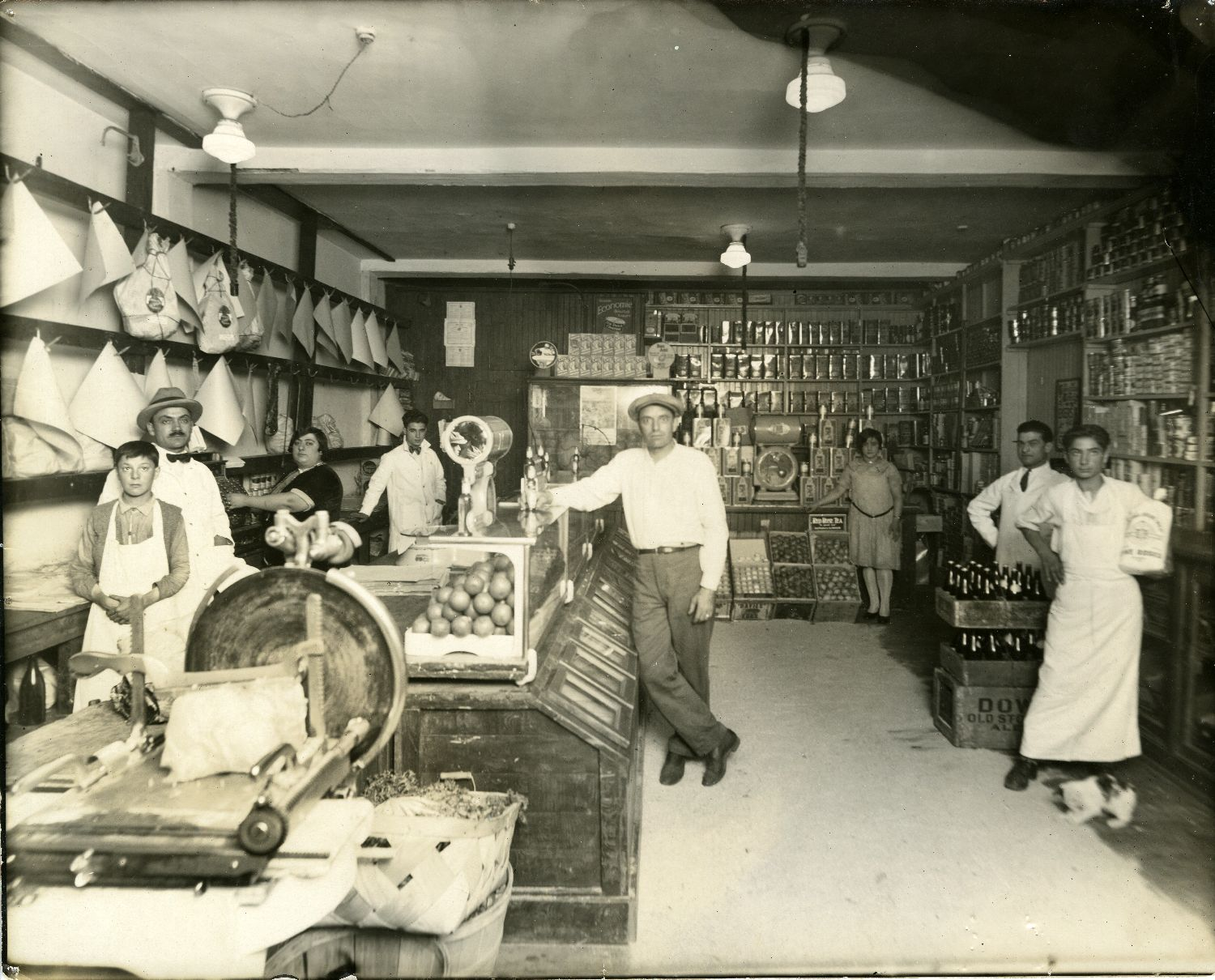
A grocery store owned by an Italian family in Little Italy, Montreal, 1910

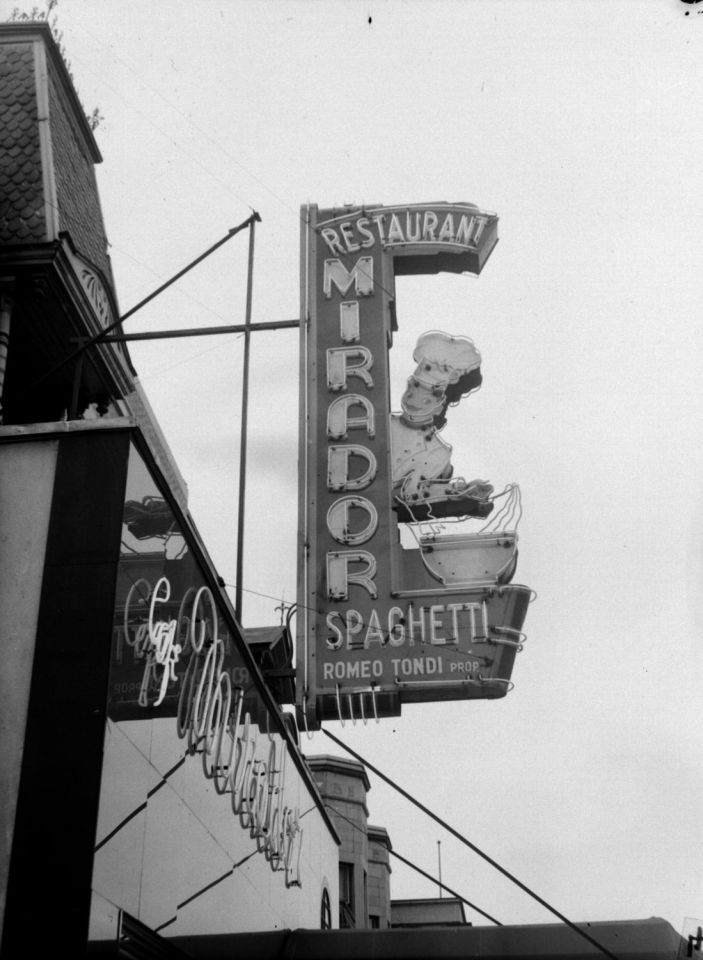
Sign of Mirador, a restaurant in Montreal owned by an Italian immigrant, 1948

The first explorer to coastal North America was the Venetian John Cabot (Giovanni Caboto), making landfall in Cape Bonavista, Newfoundland and Labrador, in 1497. His voyage to Canada and other parts of the Americas was followed by his son Sebastian Cabot (Sebastiano Caboto) and Giovanni da Verrazzano. Immediately after the unification of Italy, the young nation experienced the phenomenon of emigration on a massive scale. While until that time the migratory destinations had been mostly European, starting in the second half of the 19th century transatlantic emigration to the Americas emerged, in the direction of lands that became typical destinations for Italians. The first Canadian census enumerating the population was not conducted until 1871. At this time, there were only 1,035 people of Italian origin that lived in Canada. A number of Italians were imported, often as "soldiers of fortune" and "men of letters", to work as navvies in the construction of the Canadian Pacific Railway. In 1904, 3,144 of the 8,576 seasonal Canadian Pacific Railway workforce were Italian men. Italian workers in that period, as described by Lucy di Pietro, a manager of the Association for the Memory of Italo-Canadian Immigrants, were seen "as transients and judged, according to the stereotype, as warm-blooded people with violent and criminal dispositions". Italians were among the immigrants considered "undesirable", as expressed in Canada's first law concerning immigration, dating back to 1869. This law provided for certain categories of foreigners deemed more "desirable", precisely, for reasons of cultural affinity or stereotypes related to labor industriousness, favoring workers from Great Britain or Northern European countries. Italians were usually referred to by the nickname navvies, short for navigator, a term coined in England to refer to laborers and which from 1830 onwards was applied in a derogatory sense to those who worked on tunnel or railway construction in uncomfortable conditions.

A substantial influx of Italian immigration to Canada began in the early 20th century when over 60,000 Italians moved to Canada between 1900 and 1913. These were largely peasants from southern Italy and agrarian parts of the northeast (Veneto and Friuli). In 1905, the Royal Commission appointed to Inquire into the Immigration of Italian Labourers to Montreal and alleged Fraudulent Practices of Employment Agencies was launched into deceptive tactics used by padroni, labour brokers that recruited Italian workers for Canadian employers. These numbers were dwarfed in comparison to those of the United States, however, where about four million Italians immigrated between 1880 and 1920. Italian Canadians primarily immigrated to Toronto and Montreal. In Toronto, the Italian population increased from 4,900 in 1911, to 9,000 in 1921, constituting almost two percent of Toronto's population. Italians in Toronto and in Montreal soon established ethnic enclaves, especially Little Italies in Toronto and in Montreal. Smaller communities also arose in Vancouver, Hamilton, Niagara Falls, Guelph, Windsor, Thunder Bay, Sault Ste. Marie, Ottawa and Sherbrooke. Many also settled in mining communities in British Columbia (Trail), Alberta (Crowsnest Pass), Cape Breton Island (Inverness), and Northern Ontario (Sault Ste. Marie and Fort William).

This migration was largely halted after World War I, new immigration laws in the 1920s, and the Great Depression limited Italian immigration. Approximately 40,000 Italians came to Canada during the interwar period, predominantly from southern Italy where an economic depression and overpopulation had left many families in poverty. During World War II, Italian Canadians were regarded with suspicion and faced a great deal of discrimination. As part of the War Measures Act, 31,000 Italian Canadians were labelled as "enemy aliens" with alleged fascist connections, and between 1940 and 1943, approximately 600 to 700 of these Italian Canadian men were arrested and sent to internment camps, such as Camp Petawawa—in what was the period of Italian Canadian internment. While many Italian-Canadians had initially supported fascism and Benito Mussolini's regime for its role in enhancing Italy's presence on the world stage, most Italians in Canada did not harbour any ill will against Canada and few remained committed followers of the fascist ideology. In 1990, former prime minister Brian Mulroney apologized for the war internment of Italian Canadians to a Toronto meeting of the National Congress of Italian Canadians. In May 2009, Massimo Pacetti introduced bill C-302, an "Act to recognize the injustice that was done to persons of Italian origin through their "enemy alien" designation and internment during the Second World War, and to provide for restitution and promote education on Italian Canadian history [worth $2.5 million]", which was passed by the House of Commons on April 28, 2010; Canada Post was also to issue a commemorative postage stamp commemorating the internment of Italian Canadian citizens, however, Bill C-302 did not pass through the necessary stages to become law. In 2021, prime minister Justin Trudeau formally apologized for the war internment of Italian Canadians, in the House of Commons.

A second wave occurred after World War II when Italians, especially from the more southern regions, Lazio, Abruzzo, Molise, Apulia, Campania, Calabria, and Sicily regions, left the war-impoverished country for opportunities in a young and growing country. A small number of Istrian Italians and Dalmatian Italians also immigrated to Canada during the Istrian-Dalmatian exodus, leaving their homelands, which were lost to Italy and annexed to Yugoslavia after the Treaty of Peace with Italy, 1947. Between the early 1950s and the mid-1960s, approximately 20,000 to 30,000 Italians immigrated to Canada each year, surpassing those who went to the United States during the same period. Between 1946 and 1967, more than 90 percent of Italian immigrants took advantage of the sponsorship system whereby they were admitted into Canada if sponsored by relatives residing in Canada that would assume the financial responsibility for them during their settlement period. In 1948, relations between Canada and Italy were formalized through the opening of a Canadian embassy in Rome and an immigration office. In the late 1960s, the Italian economy experienced a period of growth and recovery, removing one of the primary incentives for emigration. In 1967, the sponsorship system was restricted, instead basing immigrant selection on labour-market considerations, also decreasing the influx of Italian immigration. 90 percent of the Italians who immigrated to Canada after World War II remained in Canada, and decades after that period, the community still had fluency in the Italian language. There has been an overall decline in the use of the Italian language in Canada since 2001.

Pier 21 in Halifax, Nova Scotia was an influential port of Italian immigration between 1928 until it ceased operations in 1971, where 471,940 individuals came to Canada from Italy, making them the third largest ethnic group to immigrate to Canada during that time period.

The rapid growth of the metropolitan areas that had attracted Italian immigrants, created a strong demand for construction work, and by the 1960s, more than 15,000 Italian men worked in Toronto's construction industry, representing one third of all construction workers in the city at that time. Others started small businesses such as barber shops, grocery stores and bakeries that created Italian ethnic enclaves. Italian women who entered the workforce often worked in the garment and clothing industry. The importance of the family unit of Italian Canadians has provided a central role in the adaptation of newer socioeconomic realities. A mid-1960s study conducted in Montreal found that two in three Canadian-born Italians had their nearest relative living in the same building as them or within a five-minute walking distance, and that more than half of those sampled had chosen to buy a house in a given area due to familiarity and because relatives and other Italian Canadians lived in the vicinity. 75 percent of Italians that immigrated after World War II were employed in low-income occupations, but by the mid-1980s, the children of immigrants had achieved a level of higher education comparable to the national average. By the 1980s, 86 percent of Italian Canadians owned a home, compared to 70 percent of the general population.

Canada thus began a multicultural policy that resulted in a strengthening of the identity of the different ethnic groups. Among them, the Italian one experienced a strong socio-cultural transformation due to multiple factors. As the mistrust caused by the fascist period ceased, Italians were able to improve their living conditions, with an increase in the social mobility of young Italian-Canadians. The second generation, better educated, began to abandon the manual jobs traditionally performed by their parents in favor of jobs for which a good level of education was necessary. Many of these young people began to speak English as their first language, moving away from the customs of their parents in a process of constructing their own specific Italian-Canadian identity, different from the category of "Italian citizens residing in Canada" or "population of Italian origin". Thus, a new identity profile was born that originated from the fusion of two cultures to become something else and evolve in its own way.

In 2010, the Government of Ontario passed Bill 103 with royal assent proclaiming the month of June as Italian Heritage Month. On May 17, 2017, the Minister of Canadian Heritage Mélanie Joly passed a unanimous motion, Motion 64, in the House of Commons to recognize the month of June as Italian Heritage Month across Canada — a time to recognize, celebrate and raise awareness of the Italian community in Canada, one of the largest outside of Italy.

In 2019, Canada received the 11th highest number of Italian emigrants, and among non-European countries was the fourth highest after Brazil, the United States and Australia. Compared to the past, the skills of migrants have changed as today there are many researchers, skilled workers and entrepreneurs. In 2018, more than half of the Italian citizens who moved abroad (53 percent) had medium-high educational qualifications: 33,000 high school graduates and 29,000 college graduates. Highly qualified people are in demand in Canada in areas that are lacking in the territory, particularly in information and communication technologies.

== Demographics ==
=== Ethnicity ===
As of the 2021 census, 1,546,390 Canadian residents stated they had Italian ancestry, comprising 4.3 percent of Canada's population, marking a 2.6 percent decrease from the 1,587,970 population of the 2016 census. From the 1,587,970, 671,510 were single ethnic origin responses, while the remaining 874,880 were multiple ethnic origin responses. The majority live in Ontario, over 900,000, (seven percent of the population), while over 300,000 live in Quebec (four percent of the population) — constituting for almost 80 percent of the national population.

Canadians of Italian ethnicity
Year	Population (single and multiple ethnic origin responses)	% of total ethnic population	Population (single ethnic origin responses)	Population (multiple ethnic origin responses)	Total % change
1871	1,035	0.03%	N/A	N/A	N/A
1881	1,849	0.04%	N/A	N/A	+78.6%
1901	10,834	0.2%	N/A	N/A	+485.9%
1911	45,411	0.6%	N/A	N/A	+319.2%
1921	66,769	0.8%	N/A	N/A	+47.0%
1931	98,173	0.9%	N/A	N/A	+47.0%
1941	112,625	1.0%	N/A	N/A	+14.7%
1951	152,245	1.1%	N/A	N/A	+35.2%
1961	459,351	2.5%	N/A	N/A	+201.7%
1971	730,820	3.4%	N/A	N/A	+59.1%
1981	747,970	3.1%	N/A	N/A	+2.3%
1991	1,147,780	4.1%	750,055	397,725	+53.5%
1996	1,207,475	4.2%	729,455	478,025	+5.2%
2001	1,270,370	4.3%	726,275	544,090	+5.2%
2006	1,445,335	4.6%	741,045	704,285	+13.8%
2011	1,488,425	4.5%	700,845	787,580	+3.0%
2016	1,587,970	4.6%	695,420	892,550	+6.7%
2021	1,546,390	4.3%	671,510	874,880	−2.6%

Italian Canadians as a percent of population by province/territory

Canadians of Italian ethnicity by province and territory (1991–2006)
Province/territory	Population (1991)	% of total ethnic population (1991)	Population (1996)	% of total ethnic population (1996)	Population (2001)	% of total ethnic population (2001)	Population (2006)	% of total ethnic population (2006)
Ontario	701,430	7.0%	743,425	7.0%	781,345	6.9%	867,980	7.2%
Quebec	226,645	3.3%	244,740	3.5%	249,205	3.5%	299,655	4.0%
British Columbia	111,990	3.4%	117,895	3.2%	126,420	3.3%	143,160	3.5%
Alberta	61,245	2.4%	58,140	2.2%	67,655	2.3%	82,015	2.5%
Manitoba	17,900	1.6%	17,205	1.6%	18,550	1.7%	21,405	1.9%
Nova Scotia	11,915	1.3%	11,200	1.2%	11,240	1.3%	13,505	1.5%
Saskatchewan	8,290	0.8%	7,145	0.7%	7,565	0.8%	7,970	0.8%
New Brunswick	4,995	0.7%	4,645	0.6%	5,610	0.8%	5,900	0.8%
Newfoundland and Labrador	1,740	0.3%	1,505	0.3%	1,180	0.2%	1,375	0.3%
Prince Edward Island	665	0.5%	515	0.4%	605	0.4%	1,005	0.7%
Yukon	440	1.6%	545	1.8%	500	1.8%	620	2.0%
Northwest Territories	510	0.9%	525	0.8%	400	1.1%	610	1.5%
Nunavut	N/A (Note: Before it separated officially from the Northwest Territories on April 1, 1999, via the Nunavut Act.)	N/A	N/A	N/A	95	0.4%	125	0.4%

Canadians of Italian ethnicity by province and territory (2011–2021)
Province/territory	Population (2011)	% of total ethnic population (2011)	Population (2016)	% of total ethnic population (2016)	Population (2021)	% of total ethnic population (2021)
Ontario	883,990	7.0%	931,805	7.0%	905,105	6.5%
Quebec	307,810	4.0%	326,700	4.1%	316,320	3.8%
British Columbia	150,660	3.5%	166,090	3.6%	162,485	3.3%
Alberta	88,705	2.5%	101,260	2.5%	98,730	2.4%
Manitoba	21,960	1.9%	23,205	1.9%	22,835	1.8%
Nova Scotia	14,305	1.6%	15,625	1.7%	16,575	1.7%
Saskatchewan	9,530	1.0%	11,310	1.1%	10,830	1.0%
New Brunswick	7,195	1.0%	7,460	1.0%	8,250	1.1%
Newfoundland and Labrador	1,825	0.4%	1,710	0.3%	2,290	0.5%
Prince Edward Island	955	0.7%	1,200	0.9%	1,655	1.1%
Yukon	725	2.2%	915	2.6%	710	1.8%
Northwest Territories	545	1.3%	505	1.2%	445	1.1%
Nunavut	215	0.7%	175	0.5%	160	0.4%

Canadians of Italian ethnicity (greater than 10,000) by metropolitan area and census agglomeration (1991–2006)
Metropolitan area	Population (1991)	% of total ethnic population (1991)	Population (1996)	% of total ethnic population (1996)	Population (2001)	% of total ethnic population (2001)	Population (2006)	% of total ethnic population (2006)
Toronto CMA (Note: See Italian Canadians in the Greater Toronto Area for more detailed information. Unlike the Greater Toronto Area, the Toronto CMA does not include the Halton municipality of Burlington, and some Durham municipalities, those being Scugog and Brock, as well as those within the Oshawa CMA (Oshawa, Whitby, and Clarington). It does, however, include some municipalities outside the Greater Toronto Area, those being the Dufferin County municipalities of Mono and Orangeville, and the Simcoe County municipalities of Bradford West Gwillimbury and New Tecumseth. The Greater Toronto Area, comprises the whole of the Regional Municipality of York, Regional Municipality of Durham, Regional Municipality of Halton, Regional Municipality of Peel and the City of Toronto.)	387,655	10.1%	414,310	9.8%	429,380	9.2%	466,155	9.2%
Montreal CMA	163,830	9.2%	220,935	6.7%	224,460	6.6%	260,345	7.3%
Greater Vancouver	58,465	3.8%	64,285	3.5%	69,000	3.5%	76,345	3.6%
Hamilton CMA	51,320 (Note: Includes pre-amalgamated Hamilton-Wentworth Regional Municipality (Hamilton (36,145, 11.4% of total population), Stoney Creek (10,150, 20.3% of total population), Glanbrook (630, 6.5% of total population), Ancaster (2,175, 9.9% of total population), Dundas (900, 4.1% of total population), Flamborough (1,320, 4.5% of total population)), Burlington (6,325, 4.9% of total population) and Grimsby (1,140, 6.2% of total population))	11.4%	62,035 (Note: Includes pre-amalgamated Hamilton-Wentworth Regional Municipality (Hamilton (35,635, 11.1% of total population), Stoney Creek (10,705, 19.7% of total population), Glanbrook (1,040, 9.9% of total population), Ancaster (2,475, 10.6% of total population), Dundas (1,155, 5.0% of total population), Flamborough (1,815, 5.3% of total population)), Burlington (7,715, 5.6% of total population) and Grimsby (1,495, 7.6% of total population))	10.0%	67,685 (Note: Includes post-amalgamated Hamilton-Wentworth Regional Municipality into Hamilton (56,265, 11.6% of total population), Burlington (9,520, 6.4% of total population) and Grimsby (1,905, 9.1% of total population))	10.3%	72,440 (Note: Includes Hamilton (58,800, 11.8% of total population), Burlington (11,430, 7.0% of total population) and Grimsby (2,215, 9.4% of total population))	10.6%
Niagara Region	43,040	10.9%	44,515	11.0%	44,645	12.0%	48,850	12.7%
National Capital Region	30,265	4.5%	34,350	3.4%	37,435	3.6%	45,005	4.0%
Greater Calgary	22,810	3.2%	23,885	2.9%	29,120	3.1%	33,645	3.1%
Windsor	20,320	10.6%	29,270	10.6%	30,680	10.1%	33,725	10.5%
Greater Edmonton	17,780	2.9%	20,020	2.3%	22,385	2.4%	28,805	2.8%
Greater Winnipeg	14,460	2.3%	15,245	2.3%	16,105	2.4%	18,580	2.7%
Sault Ste. Marie	16,930	20.8%	16,480	20.0%	16,315	21.0%	17,720	22.4%
Thunder Bay	14,265	12.5%	15,095	12.1%	15,395	12.8%	17,290	14.3%
London	13,455	4.4%	15,570	4.0%	17,290	4.1%	20,380	4.5%
Greater Sudbury	12,210	7.6%	11,990	7.5%	12,030	7.8%	13,415	8.6%
Oshawa CMA (Note: Includes the municipalities of Oshawa, Whitby, and Clarington. See Italian Canadians in the Greater Toronto Area for more detailed information.)	N/A	N/A	11,675	4.4%	13,990	4.8%	18,225	5.6%
Guelph	N/A	N/A	N/A	N/A	11,135	9.6%	12,110	9.6%
Kitchener-Cambridge-Waterloo	N/A	N/A	10,240	2.5%	11,365	2.8%	13,675	3.1%
Barrie	N/A	N/A	N/A	N/A	N/A	N/A	10,330	5.9%

Canadians of Italian ethnicity (greater than 10,000) by metropolitan area and census agglomeration (2011–2021)
Metropolitan area	Population (2011)	% of total ethnic population (2011)	Population (2016)	% of total ethnic population (2016)	Population (2021)	% of total ethnic population (2021)
Toronto CMA	475,090	8.6%	484,360	8.3%	444,755	7.2%
Montreal CMA	263,565	7.0%	279,795	7.0%	267,240	6.3%
Greater Vancouver	82,435	3.6%	87,875	3.6%	83,200	3.2%
Hamilton CMA	75,900 (Note: Includes Hamilton (60,535, 11.9% of total population), Burlington (12,755, 7.4% of total population) and Grimsby (2,610, 10.4% of total population))	10.7%	79,725 (Note: Includes Hamilton (62,335, 11.8% of total population), Burlington (14,235, 7.9% of total population) and Grimsby (3,155 11.8% of total population))	10.8%	80,165 (Note: Includes Hamilton (61,195, 10.9% of total population), Burlington (15,545, 8.5% of total population) and Grimsby (3,425 12.0% of total population))	10.4%
Niagara Region	48,530	12.6%	49,345	12.4%	50,210	11.8%
National Capital Region	47,975	4.0%	53,825	4.1%	55,945	3.8%
Greater Calgary	36,875	3.1%	42,940	3.1%	41,620	2.8%
Windsor	30,880	9.8%	33,175	10.2%	37,665	9.1%
Greater Edmonton	29,580	2.6%	33,800	2.6%	32,235	2.3%
Oshawa CMA	20,265	5.8%	22,870	6.1%	22,745	5.5%
London	20,210	4.3%	22,625	4.6%	22,755	4.3%
Greater Winnipeg	18,405	2.6%	19,435	2.6%	19,060	2.3%
Sault Ste. Marie	16,005	20.4%	16,025	20.9%	14,945	19.8%
Thunder Bay	15,575	13.1%	16,610	14.0%	16,615	13.7%
Kitchener-Cambridge-Waterloo	14,860	3.2%	18,650	3.6%	19,475	3.4%
Greater Sudbury	13,115	8.3%	13,500	8.3%	12,935	7.7%
Guelph	12,915	9.3%	14,430	9.6%	14,075	8.6%
Barrie	11,415	6.2%	14,460	7.4%	16,190	7.7%
Victoria	10,535	3.1%	11,665	3.3%	12,750	3.3%

=== Language and immigration ===
As of 2021, of the 1,546,390 Italian Canadians, 204,070 are Italian born immigrants, with 319,505 claiming Italian as their mother tongue. There has been an overall decline in the use of the Italian language since 2001.

Italian mother tongue speakers in Canada
Year	Population	% of non-official language mother tongue speakers in Canada	% of all language mother tongue speakers in Canada	% of Italian Canadians
1991	449,660	12.7%	1.7%	39.2%
1996	484,500	10.5%	1.7%	40.1%
2001	469,485	9.0%	1.6%	37.0%
2006	455,040	7.4%	1.5%	31.5%
2011	407,485	6.2%	1.2%	27.4%
2016	375,645	5.1%	1.1%	23.7%
2021	319,505	4.1%	0.9%	20.7%

Italian immigrant population to Canada
Period	Population	% of total Canadian immigration
1901–1910	58,104	3.5%
1911–1920	62,663	3.7%
1921–1930	26,183	2.1%
1931–1940	3,898	2.4%
1941–1950	20,682	4.2%
1951–1960	250,812	15.9%
1961–1970	190,760	13.5%
1971–1978	37,087	3.1%

Italian immigrant population in Canada
Year	Population	% of immigrants in Canada	% of Canadian population
1986	366,820	9.4%	1.5%
1991	351,615	8.1%	1.3%
1996	332,110	6.7%	1.2%
2001	315,455	5.8%	1.1%
2006	296,850	4.8%	0.9%
2011	260,250	3.6%	0.8%
2016	236,635	3.1%	0.7%
2021	204,070	2.4%	0.6%

=== Religion ===
Religious affiliation of Italian Canadians
Religious group	2001 (Note: Religious breakdown proportions based on "Italian" ethnic or cultural origin response on the 2001 census.)			2021 (Note: Religious breakdown proportions based on "Italian" ethnic or cultural origin response on the 2021 census.)			
Religious group	Population	% of Italian Canadians	% of Canadian population	Population	% of Italian Canadians	% of Canadian population	
Religious group	Christianity	1,152,985	90.8%	5.3%	1,099,490	71.1%	5.7%
Islam	1,560	0.1%	0.3%	3,715	0.2%	0.2%	
Irreligion	109,515	8.6%	2.2%	427,340	27.6%	3.4%	
Judaism	2,935	0.2%	0.9%	5,480	0.4%	1.6%	
Buddhism	1,065	0.08%	0.4%	1,640	0.1%	0.5%	
Hinduism	400	0.03%	0.1%	395	0.03%	0.05%	
Indigenous spirituality	600	0.05%	2.0%	545	0.04%	0.7%	
Sikhism	130	0.01%	0.05%	365	0.02%	0.05%	
Other	1,175	0.09%	3.4%	7,430	0.5%	3.2%	

Christian denominations of Italian Canadians
Christian denomination	2001			2021			
Christian denomination	Population	% of Christian Italian Canadians	% of Christian Canadian population	Population	% of Christian Italian Canadians	% of Christian Canadian population	
Christian denomination	Catholic	1,015,725	88.1%	7.9%	945,995	86.0%	8.7%
Orthodox	5,720	0.5%	1.2%	10,880	1.0%	1.8%	
Protestant	113,455	9.8%	1.3%	76,090	6.9%	1.7%	
Other Christian	18,085	1.6%	2.3%	66,525	6.1%	2.4%	

=== Income ===
Income of Italian Canadians
Year	Median personal income	% change	% of Canadian median income
1996	$19,961	N/A	+5.7%
2016	$36,452	+82.6%	+6.6%

== Italian Canadian culture, media and education ==
Notable Italian-Canadian films have included Almost America, Caffè Italia, Montréal, Corbo, Enigmatico, From the Vine, Mambo Italiano, The Saracen Woman (La Sarrasine) and Ricardo Trogi's semi-autobiographical tetralogy of 1981, 1987, 1991 and 1995.

Depictions of Italian Canadians in television have included the series Ciao Bella, Fugget About It and Il Duce canadese.

In literature, the novels of Nino Ricci, particularly his Governor General's Award-winning 1990 novel Lives of the Saints, are the best-known depictions of Italian-Canadian culture.

== Italian districts in Canada ==
=== Alberta ===
- Little Italy, Edmonton

=== Greater Montreal area ===
- LaSalle, Quebec
- Laval, Quebec
- Little Italy, Montreal
- Montréal-Nord
- Notre-Dame-de-Grâce, Montreal (Saint-Raymond)
- Rivière-des-Prairies, Montreal
- Saint-Léonard—Saint-Michel
- Saint-Léonard, Quebec
- Saint-Michel, Montreal
- Via Italia

=== Ottawa ===
- Little Italy, Ottawa
- St. Anthony of Padua (Ottawa)

=== Nova Scotia ===
- Dominion, Nova Scotia, and other communities on Cape Breton Island

=== Hamilton, Ontario ===
- James St. North
- Stoney Creek

=== Greater Toronto Area ===
- Little Italy, Toronto
- Palmerston-Little Italy, Toronto
- Corso Italia – St. Clair Avenue West
- Corso Italia-Davenport, Toronto
- Maple Leaf, Toronto
- Downsview, Toronto
- Woodbridge, Vaughan
- Nobleton, King
- Bolton, Caledon

=== Windsor, Ontario ===
- Via Italia, Erie St.

=== British Columbia ===
- Burnaby, British Columbia
- Little Italy, Vancouver
- Trail, British Columbia

=== Manitoba ===
- Little Italy, Winnipeg

== See also ==
- Canada–Italy relations
- Demographics of Canada
- Italian Canadians in the Greater Toronto Area
- Italian Canadians in Greater Montreal
- Italian Walk of Fame
- Languages of Canada
- Italian language in Canada
