= Church of the Madonna della Difesa =

Church building in Quebec, Canada

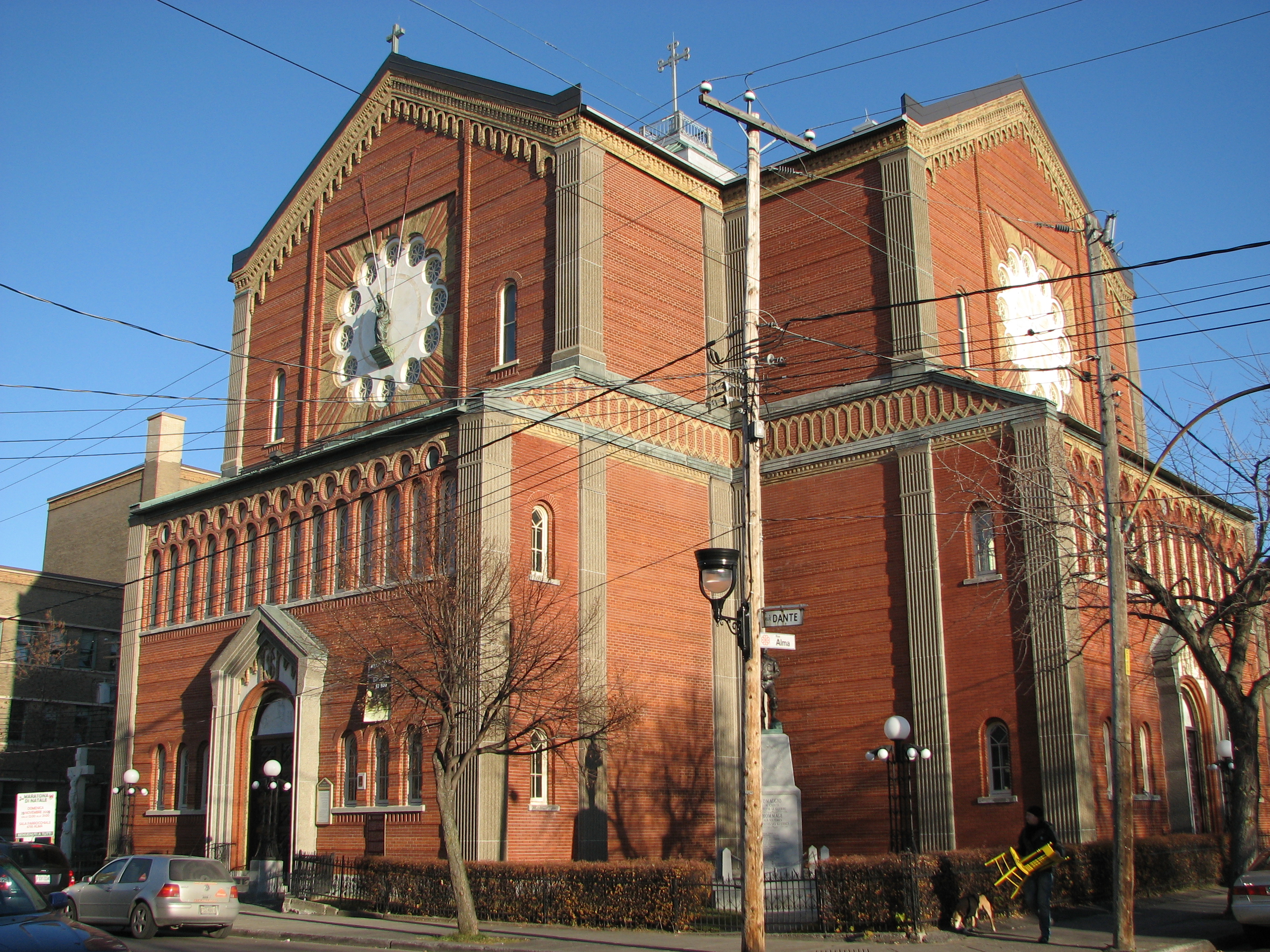
- Church of the Madonna della Difesa

Religion
- Affiliation: Roman Catholic
- Leadership: Archdiocese of Montreal
- Year consecrated: 1919
- Status: Operational

National Historic Site of Canada
- Official name: Church of Notre-Dame-de-la-Défense National Historic Site of Canada
- Designated: 2002

Location
- Location: 6800, avenue Henri-Julien; Montreal, Quebec, Canada
- Interactive map of Church of the Madonna della Difesa

Architecture
- Architects: Roch Montbriant; Guido Nincheri
- Type: Church
- Style: Romanesque
- Completed: 1919

The Church of the Madonna della Difesa (Italian: Chiesa della Madonna della Difesa, French: Église de Notre-Dame-de-la-Défense) is a Catholic church in the neighbourhood of Little Italy in Montreal, Quebec, Canada. It was built by Italian immigrants to the city, specifically those from Molise, to commemorate the apparition of the Madonna in La Difesa, in Casacalenda, Molise. It was designed by Roch Montbriant and Italo-Canadian artist Guido Nincheri, the so-called "the Michelangelo of Montreal." It is Romanesque in style and laid out in a Greek-cross floorplan. It was inaugurated in 1919.

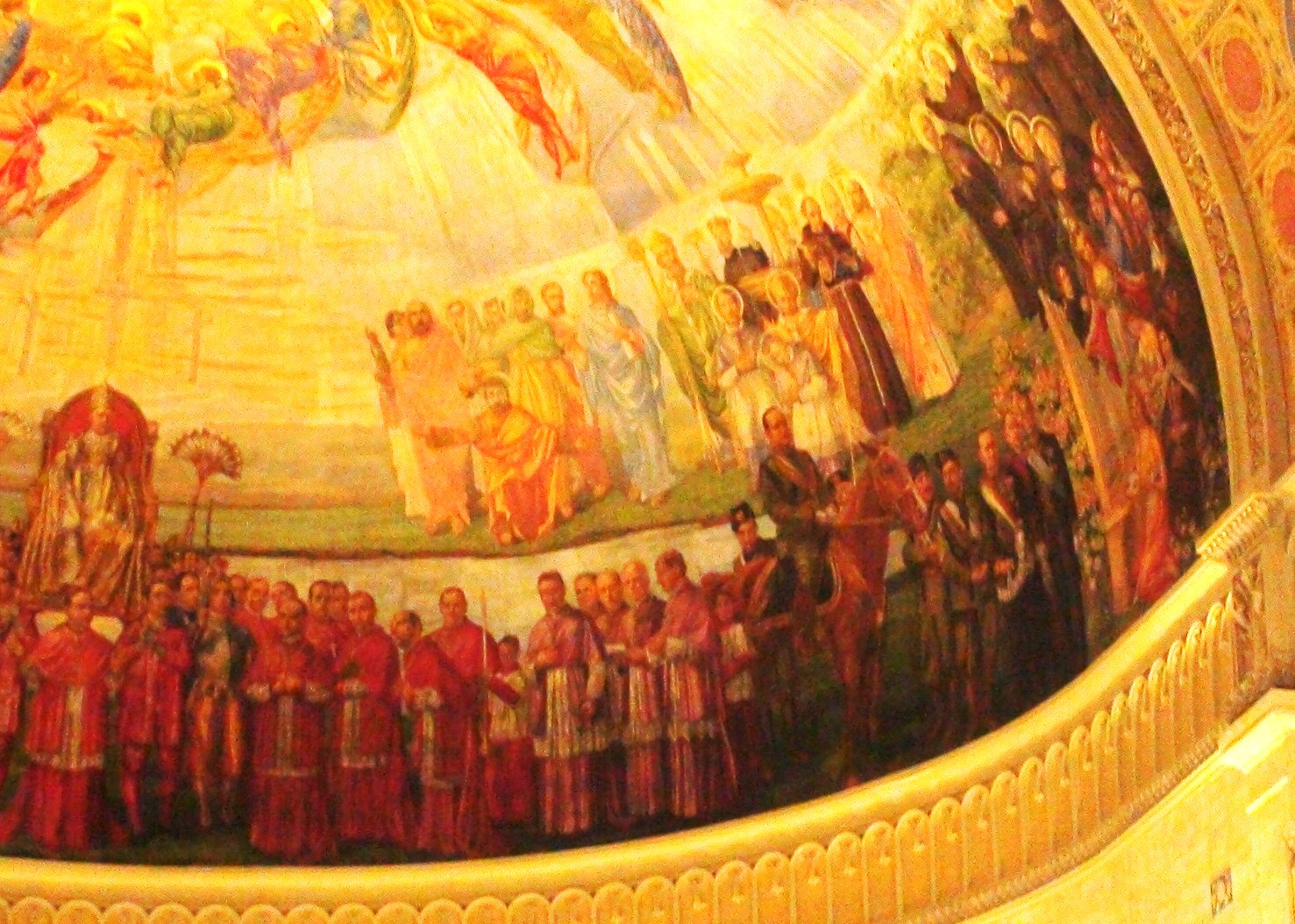
Mussolini on a horse

It is famous for its large cupola and brick façade, and especially its frescos by Guido Nincheri.

A particularly well-known fresco depicts Benito Mussolini on a horse; painted before World War II, it commemorates his signing of the Lateran Accords.

A statue in front of the church commemorates "victims of all wars."

Designated a National Historic Site of Canada in 2002, it is located at 6800 Henri-Julien Avenue at the corner of Dante Street (Jean-Talon or Beaubien metro stations) in the borough of Rosemont—La Petite-Patrie. Plaqued in 2005, the Church serves the oldest Italian community in Canada.

Three priests serve at the church; all are members of the Priestly Fraternity of the Missionaries of St.Charles Borromeo.

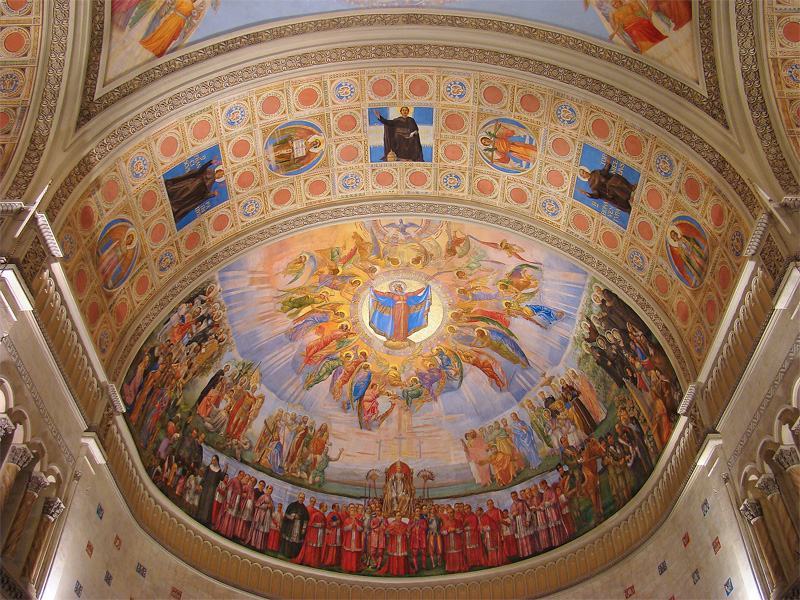
The apse

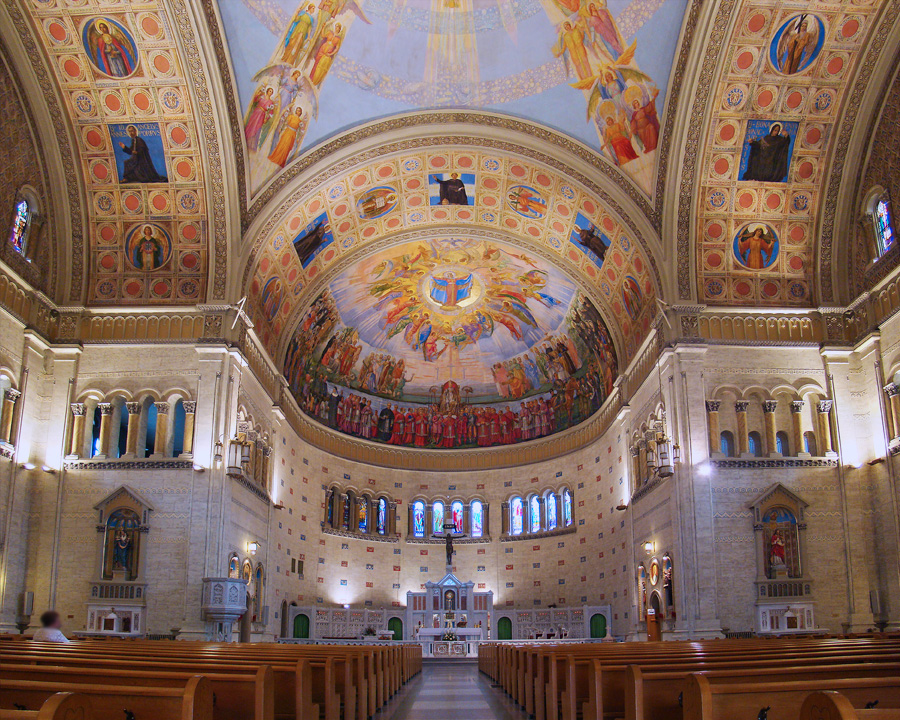
The interior

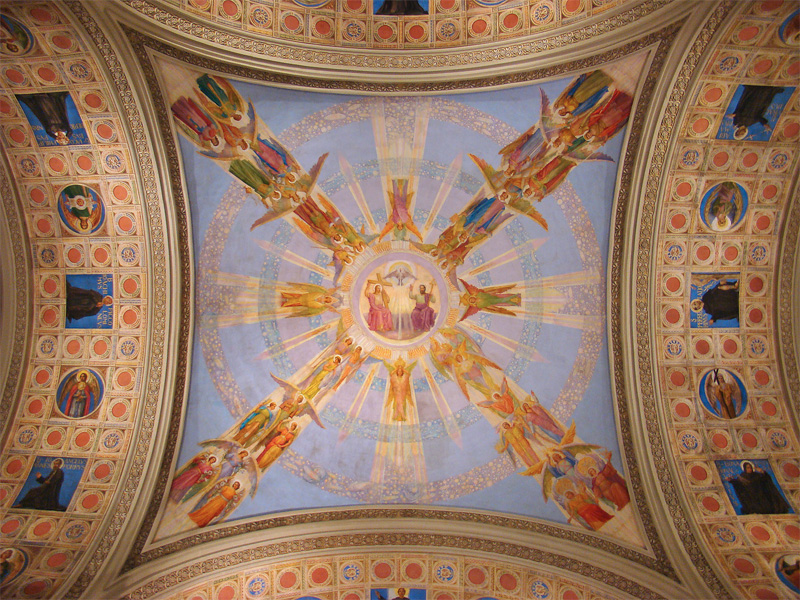
The transept crossing
