= Jamet =

Jamet is a surname. Notable people with the surname include:

- Denis Jamet (died 1625), French priest
- France Jamet, French politician
- Pierre Jamet (1893–1991), French harpist and pedagogue
- Philippe Jamet (born 1961), French engineer and academic
- Marie-Claire Jamet (born 1933), harpist, daughter of Pierre Jamet
- Victor Jamet (1853–1919), French mathematician
