= Renée Maheu =

Renée Maheu CM
- Born: Renée Anctil; February 14, 1929; Quebec City, Quebec, Canada
- Died: March 19, 2007 (aged 78); Cowansville, Quebec, Canada
- Occupations: Biographer; Journalist; Soprano
- Awards: Member of the Order of Canada

Renée Maheu (née Anctil; February 14, 1929 – March 19, 2007) was a Canadian biographer, journalist and soprano. She made her professional solo debut with the Orchestre Symphonique de Québec in 1959. Maheu performed in Canada, London, Rome and Paris with the McGill Chamber Orchestra, the Montreal Symphony Orchestra, the Accademia Nazionale di Santa Cecilia. She switched to journalism following a serious accident in Yugoslavia and author of numerous texts and reviews and books. Maheu was appointed a Member of the Order of Canada in 1990.

== Early life and education ==
Maheu was born in Quebec City, Canada, on February 14, 1929. From the age of seven, she studied music. Mateu studied piano and voice at Université Laval and then French opera at the school of Vincent d'Indy in Montreal with Raoul Jobin and Louise André from 1957 to 1960 and was an honor graduate. She then studied German songs with Bernard Diamant between 1960 and 1965; then in Rome with Maestra Fambri and Giorgio Favaretto between 1968 and 1970; in Paris with Pierre Bernac from 1967 to 1968 and Ré Koster between 1971 and 1974. Maheu also attended Norbert Dufourcq's musicology courses at the Conservatoire de Paris between 1965 and 1968.

== Career ==
In 1959, she made her professional solo debut in Joseph Haydn's The Creation with the Orchestre Symphonique de Québec conducted by Françoys Bernier. Maheu also took part in multiple radio and television broadcasts. Between 1960 and 1972, she performed in Canada, London, Rome and Paris, with the McGill Chamber Orchestra, the Montreal Symphony Orchestra, the Accademia Nazionale di Santa Cecilia (under Fernando Previtali), Huguette Dreyfus, Kenneth Gilbert, Marie-Claire Jamet, Christian Lardé, André Turp, and Vlado Perlemuter. Maheu was also on a Jeunesses musicales of Canada tour. Following her studies in French 18th-century vocal music on a Canada Council grant in 1965, Maheu wasone of the first to introduce 18th-century French cantatas to Canada under the editorship of the musicologist Renée Viollier. She recorded Marie Noël's Chants sauvages with Françoise Petit and the choir of the JM de France in 1967, and performed at the Montmartre Cultural Center.

She turned to journalism and writing following a major accident in Yugoslavia in 1968 that forced her to give up performing. Maheu was the author of numerous texts and reviews in various genres, on international festivals in particular, since she was a member of the Fédération Nationale de la Presse Française and of the Syndicat professionnel de la critique musicale et dramatique de Paris. She was a contributor to Le Devoir from 1974 to 1980. Other publications Maheu contributed to include Harmonie Panorama-Musique, The Canada Music Book, Musicanada, Opera Canada, Opéra international, Sonances, and the EMC. She was involved in multiple CBC Radio and television programs, among them Chronique du disque, L'Opéra du samedi, and Femmes d'aujourd'hui. Maheu produced the 12-part series Les Grandes voix du Canada for Radio France in 1984, and the 26-program TV5 Canada series Jeunes virtuoses in 1988.

She was the author of the 1983 book Raoul Jobin, la voix d'or du Québec, and the 1988 publication Pierrette Alarie et Léopold Simoneau: deux voix, un art as well as biographies on Arthur LeBlanc and John Newmark. Maheu was music consultant and co-script writer for the 1987 Gilles Carle documentary, Vive Québec, and was preparing a feature film on bel canto with Gian Carlo Menotti in 1991.

== Personal life ==
She was made a Pro Helvetia Fellow in 1990, and was appointed Member of the Order of Canada by the Governor General of Canada in October 1990. Maheu died on March 19, 2007 at Hôpital Brome-Missisquoi-Perkins, Cowansville, Quebec. Her funeral was held at Saint-Viateur d'Outremont Church on March 24, 2007.
