= Maheu =

Maheu is a surname. Notable people with the surname include:

- Shirley Maheu, a Canadian politician
- Robert Maheu, an American businessman who was implicated in a plot to assassinate Fidel Castro
- René Maheu, sixth director-general at UNESCO
- Renée Maheu, Canadian biographer, journalist and soprano
- Naama Maheu Latasi, first woman to be elected to the parliament of Tuvalu

== See also ==
- Maheu River, a river of the L'Île-d'Orléans Regional County Municipality, Capitale-Nationale, Quebec, Canada
