= Raoul Jobin =

Canadian opera singer

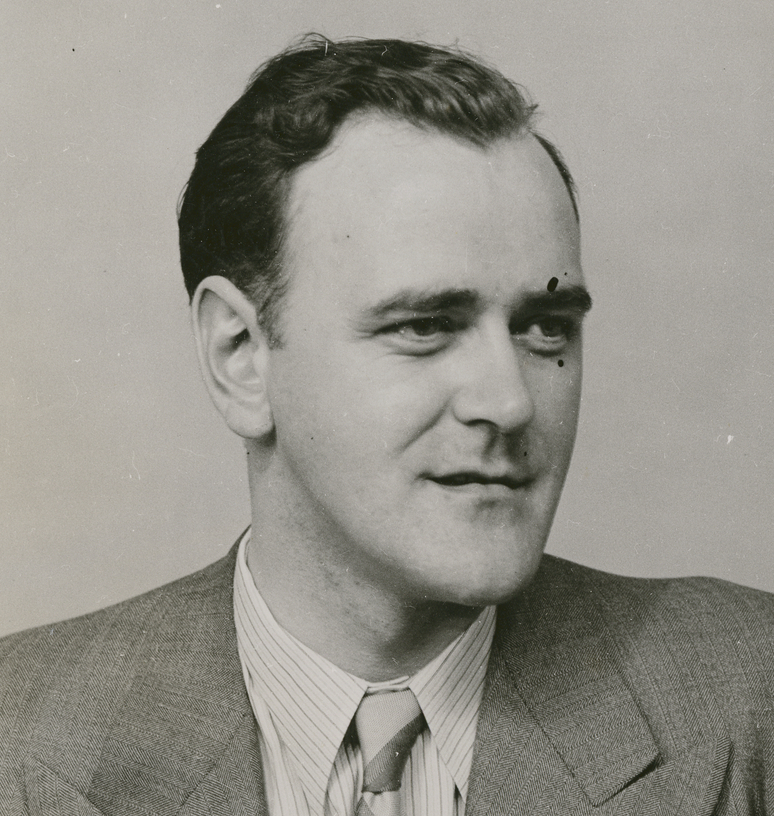

Background information
- Born: Joseph Roméo Jobin; April 8, 1906; Quebec City, Quebec
- Died: January 13, 1974 (aged 67) Quebec City, Quebec

Raoul Jobin, CC (April 8, 1906 – January 13, 1974) was a French-Canadian operatic tenor, particularly associated with the French repertory.

== Life and career ==
Born Joseph Roméo Jobin in Quebec City, Quebec, where he first took private voice lessons before studying with Emile Larochelle at the Laval University. He then went to Paris to continue his studies with Mme d'Estainville-Rousset (singing) and Abby Chéreau (stage skills), his exceptional voice quickly captured attention and he made his debut at the Paris Opéra on July 3, 1930, as Tybalt in Roméo et Juliette.

From then on, his career made rapid progress. He quickly sang principal tenor roles at both the Opéra and the Opéra-Comique, as well as in many cities throughout France, Lyons, Toulouse, Bordeaux, Marseilles, etc. He sang mainly the French repertoire, with occasional incursions into the Italian repertoire. In 1939 he created the role of Fabrice Del Dongo in La Chartreuse de Parme by Henri Sauguet. With the outbreak of the war, he returned to North America.

He made his debut at the Metropolitan Opera on February 19, 1940, as des Grieux in Manon. He remained with the company until 1950, where he sang many roles alongside such singers as Lily Pons, Bidu Sayão, Licia Albanese, Rise Stevens, under conductors such as Wilfrid Pelletier and Thomas Beecham, among many others. He made regular appearances in San Francisco, Chicago, Boston, New Orleans, etc., also appearing in Mexico City, Rio de Janeiro, and Buenos Aires.

The war over, he returned to Paris in 1947, where he successfully sang his first major Wagnerian role, Lohengrin, earning him the nickname "Monsieur Lohengrin". He later sang the role of Walther in Die Meistersinger von Nürnberg with equal success.

Subsequently, Jobin divided his time largely between Europe and America, maintaining his high standard in his accustomed roles while adding new ones, until his retirement from the stage in 1958.

He began teaching at the Conservatoire de musique du Québec à Montréal, and later at the Conservatoire de musique du Québec à Québec where he notably served as director from 1961–1970. He trained many young Canadian singers, notably Colette Boky, Jean Bonhomme, and Huguette Tourangeau.

He had been created Chevalier de la Légion d'honneur in 1951, and he was made a Companion of the Order of Canada in 1967.

His son, André Jobin (1933-2023), was also an opera singer, first as a baritone, and later as a tenor. He enjoyed a successful career in both Europe and North America.

== Sources ==
- The Encyclopedia of Music in Canada, Renée Maheu and Marc Samson.

== Selected recordings ==
- Airs from Tosca, Carmen, Werther - orchestra of the Opéra-Comique - André Cluytens, and from Lohengrin and Siegfried - orchestra of the Opéra - Louis Forrestier (recorded at the Théâtre des Champs-Elysées in 1947 and 1948 for Columbia)
- Offenbach - Les contes d'Hoffmann - Raoul Jobin, Renée Doria, Vina Bovy, Géori Boué, Louis Musy, André Pernet, Charles Soix, Roger Bourdin - Choeurs et orchestre de l'Opéra-Comique - André Cluytens - 1948
- Bizet - Carmen - Solange Michel, Raoul Jobin, Martha Angelici, Michel Dens - Choeurs et orchestre de l'Opéra-Comique - André Cluytens - 1950
- Gounod - Roméo et Juliette - Janine Micheau, Raoul Jobin, Heinz Rehfuss - Choeurs et orchestre de l'Opéra de Paris - Alberto Erede - 1953
- Excerpts from La Damnation de Faust and from Werther, with Irma Kolassi - London Symphony Orchestra - Anatole Fistoulari (recorded Kingsway Hall, 4 October 1954, issue Decca LXT5034)
- Fauré - Pénélope - Régine Crespin, Raoul Jobin, Robert Massard, Christiane Gayraud - Choeurs et orchestre de RTF - Désiré-Émile Inghelbrecht - live recording 1956
