= Guido Nincheri =

Italian-Canadian stained glass and fresco artist (1885-1973)

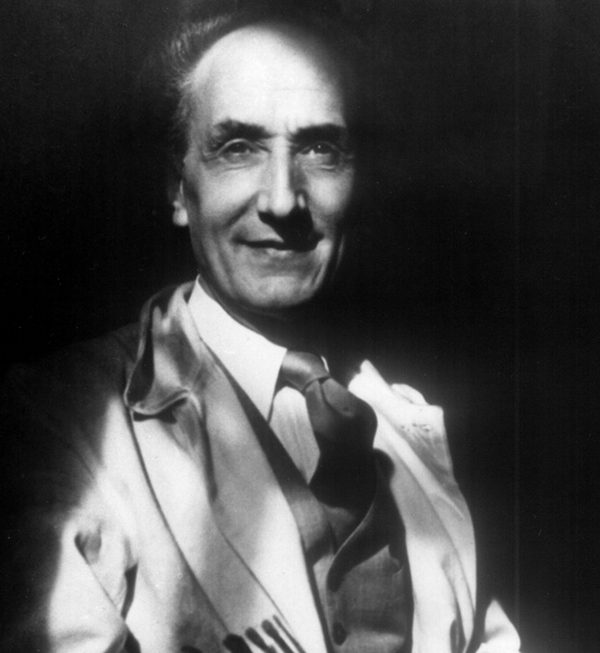
- Born: 29 September 1885; Prato, Tuscany, Italy
- Died: 1 March 1973 (aged 87); Providence, Rhode Island, U.S.
- Education: Accademia di Belle Arti di Firenze
- Known for: Stained glass, fresco
- Style: Religious art

Guido Nincheri (29 September 1885 – 1 March 1973) was an Italian-Canadian painter and designer working mainly in stained glass and fresco. Nicknamed "the Michelangelo of Montreal," he produced such pieces in over 100 churches in both Canada and the United States, and also designed several churches including Saint-Léon de Westmount. He is considered a Person of National Historic Significance.

== Biography ==
Guido Nincheri was born in Prato, Tuscany, in 1885. He studied for 12 years at the Academy of Fine Arts in Florence, where he was a pupil of Adolfo de Carolis. He immigrated to Canada in November 1913, settling in Montreal after a short stay in Boston. He listed the artists Titian and Raphael as his strongest influences. He worked for Henri Perdriau, decorating churches in Quebec. He produced stained glass windows and frescoes for 100+ churches in Canada and United States.

Nincheri designed the interior decoration of many Catholic churches across Canada and New England, including Saint-Viateur d'Outremont and Saint-Léon de Westmount Church (a National Historic Site of Canada).

He not only executed frescoes and stained glass, but also designed a number of churches, including St. Anthony of Padua in Ottawa and the Church of the Madonna della Difesa in Montreal, which is famous for its fresco depicting Benito Mussolini on horseback among a group of the faithful. In the United States many of his works are found in the Franco-American Catholic Churches of the Providence Diocese in Rhode Island. Three of his largest works are in the Church of Christ the King, West Warwick, Rhode Island. His secular work includes the Roger Williams Park Museum of Natural History and Planetarium in Providence, Rhode Island and the Château Dufresne in Montreal.

St. John the Evangelist Anglican Church in Prescott, Ontario is home to Nincheri's "Lost Window", depicting the nativity and signed by the artist. Listed in their records simply as St John's Church, Prescott, curators assumed the window was in the counties of Prescott-Russell near the Quebec border but could not find it. St John the Evangelist is on the St Lawrence River west of Cornwall and south of Ottawa. From the 1930s until 2013, the three-panel scene graced the chapel attached to the church. When the chapel and adjacent hall were sold, the congregation had the window refurbished and moved into the main church worship space.

In addition to the churches mentioned above, his frescoes can be seen in Holy Ghost Church in Providence, Rhode Island; St. Ann's Church Complex in Woonsocket, Rhode Island (which contains the largest collection in North America); Ste. Amélie in Baie-Comeau, Quebec; St. Theresa of the Child Jesus in Ottawa; St. Francis of Assisi in Toronto; St. Michael's and St. Anthony's in Montreal; and the Chapel of the Saints-Noms-de-Jésus-et-de-Marie Mother House in Montreal.

Nincheri executed an estimated 5000 stained glass windows in about 200 different churches in Quebec, Ontario, the Maritimes, British Columbia, and New England, as well as at St. Stanislaus Church in Amsterdam, New York.

== Recognition ==
Pope Pius XI dubbed Nincheri "the church's greatest artist of religious themes".

Nincheri was knighted by the Italian government in 1972.

In 1992, Nincheri was honoured for his contribution during Montreal's 350th anniversary celebrations.

One of his circa 1940 stained glass windows, entitled "Our Lady of the Rosary" from Holy Rosary Cathedral (Vancouver) was featured on a Canadian Christmas 45-cent postage stamp in 1997.

For his work at the Roger Williams Park Museum, which was donated without charge, the city of Providence named Nincheri an honorary citizen.

== Gallery of works ==
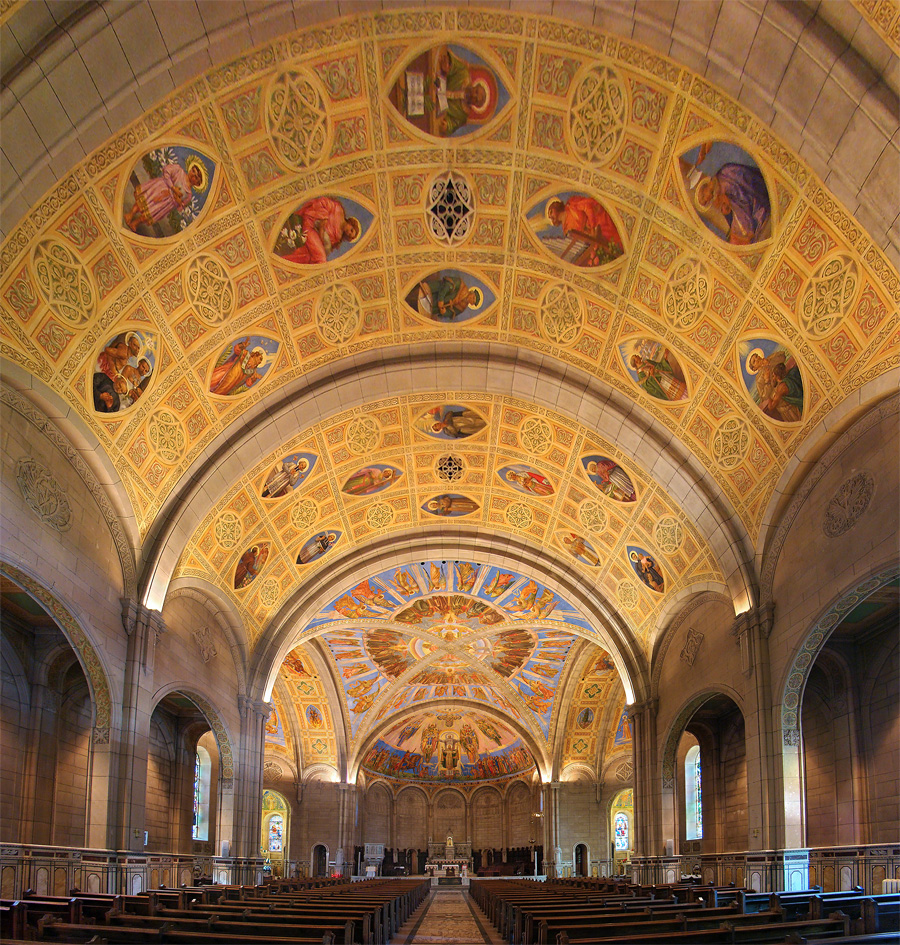
Interior decoration of Saint-Léon de Westmount Church

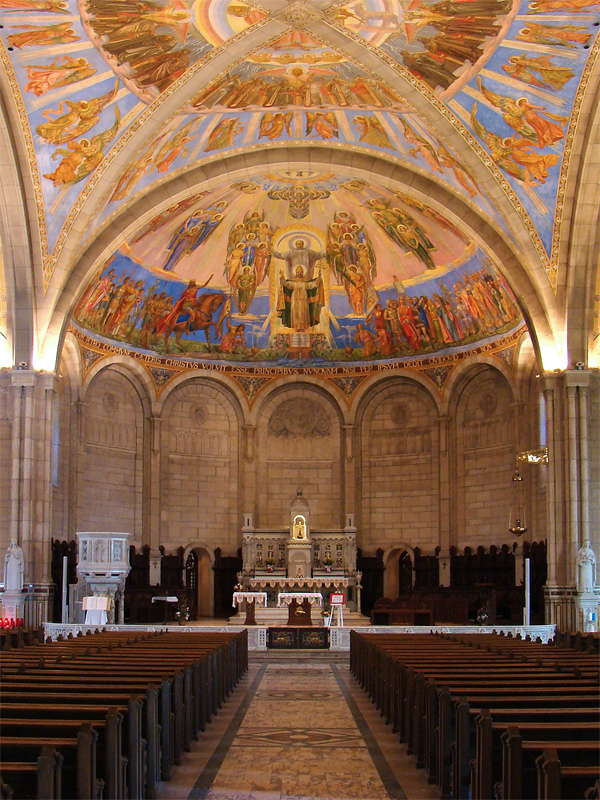
Interior decoration of Saint-Léon de Westmount Church

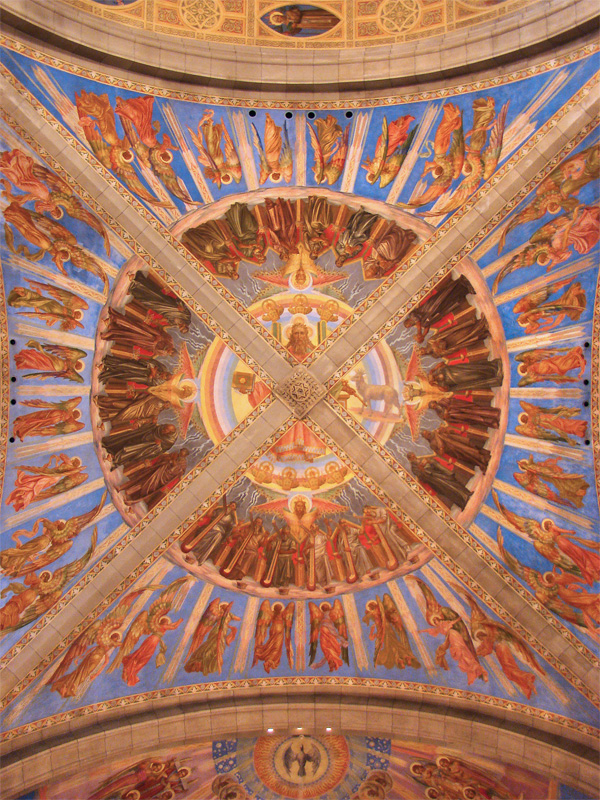
Interior decoration of Saint-Léon de Westmount Church

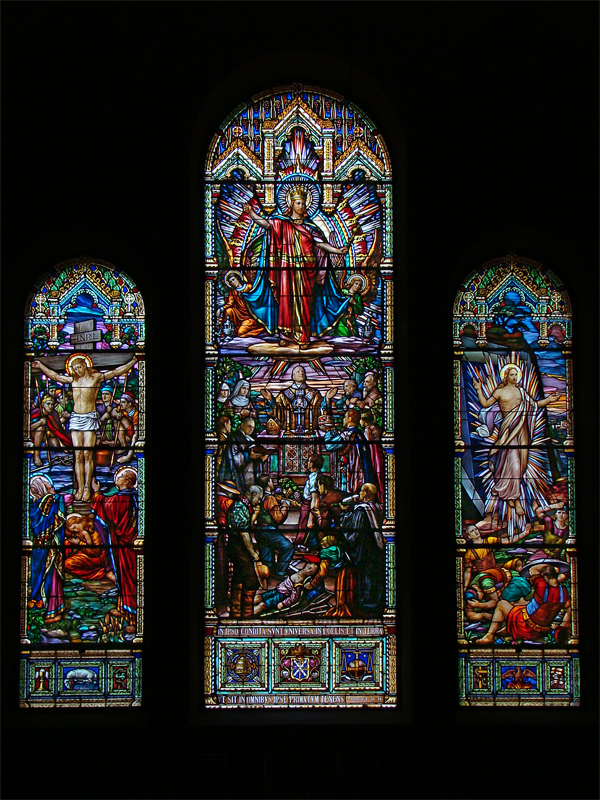
Stained glass in Saint-Léon de Westmount Church

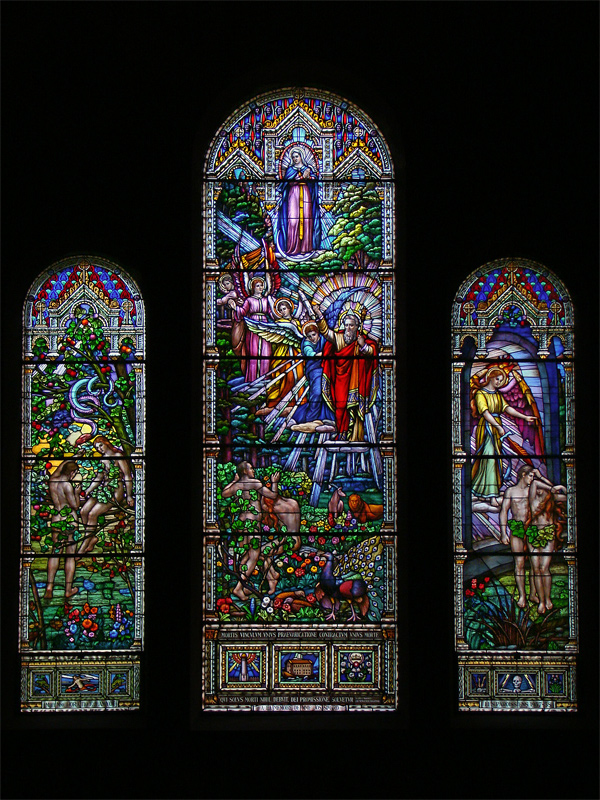
Stained glass in Saint-Léon de Westmount Church

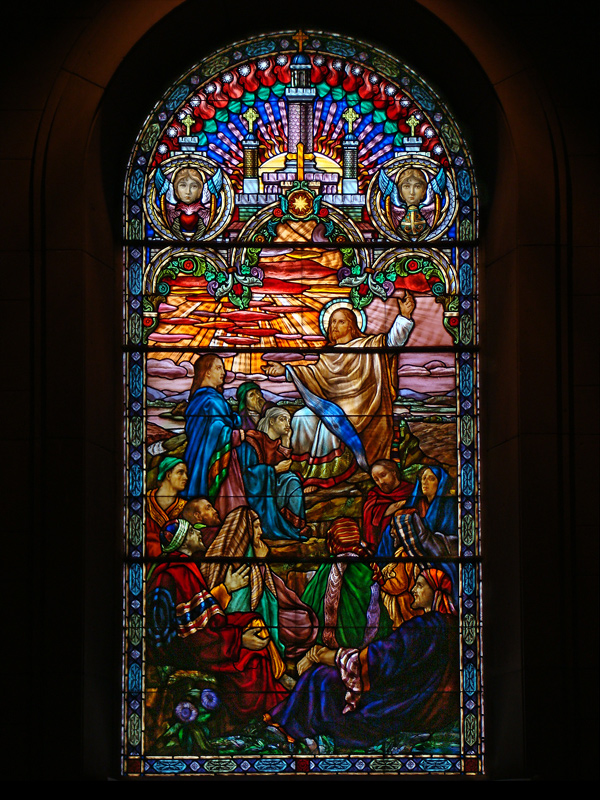
Stained stained glass in Saint-Léon de Westmount Church

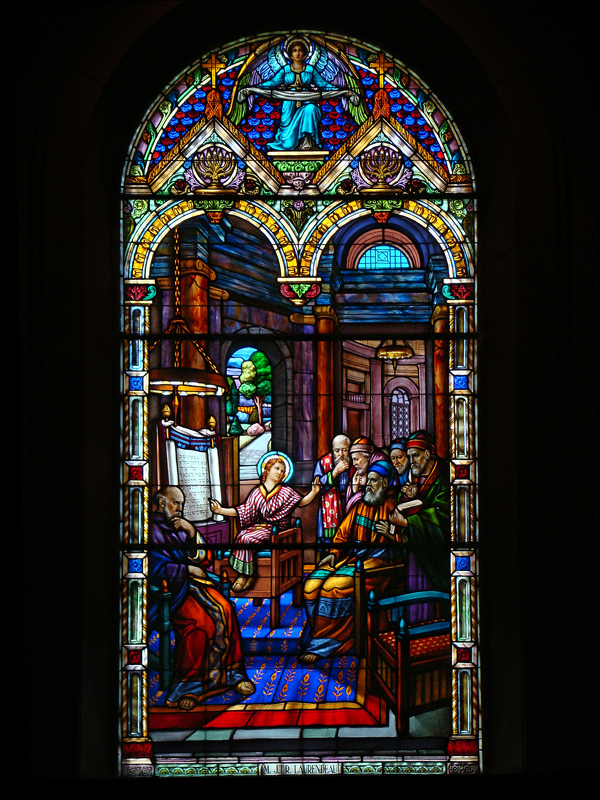
Stained stained glass in Saint-Léon de Westmount Church

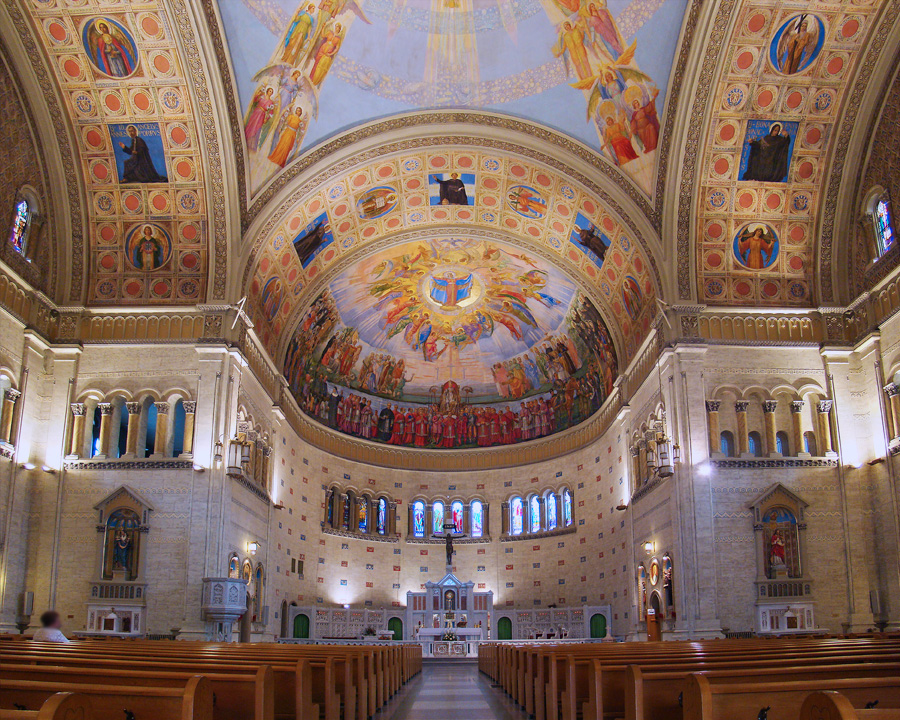
Interior decoration of Church of the Madonna della Difesa

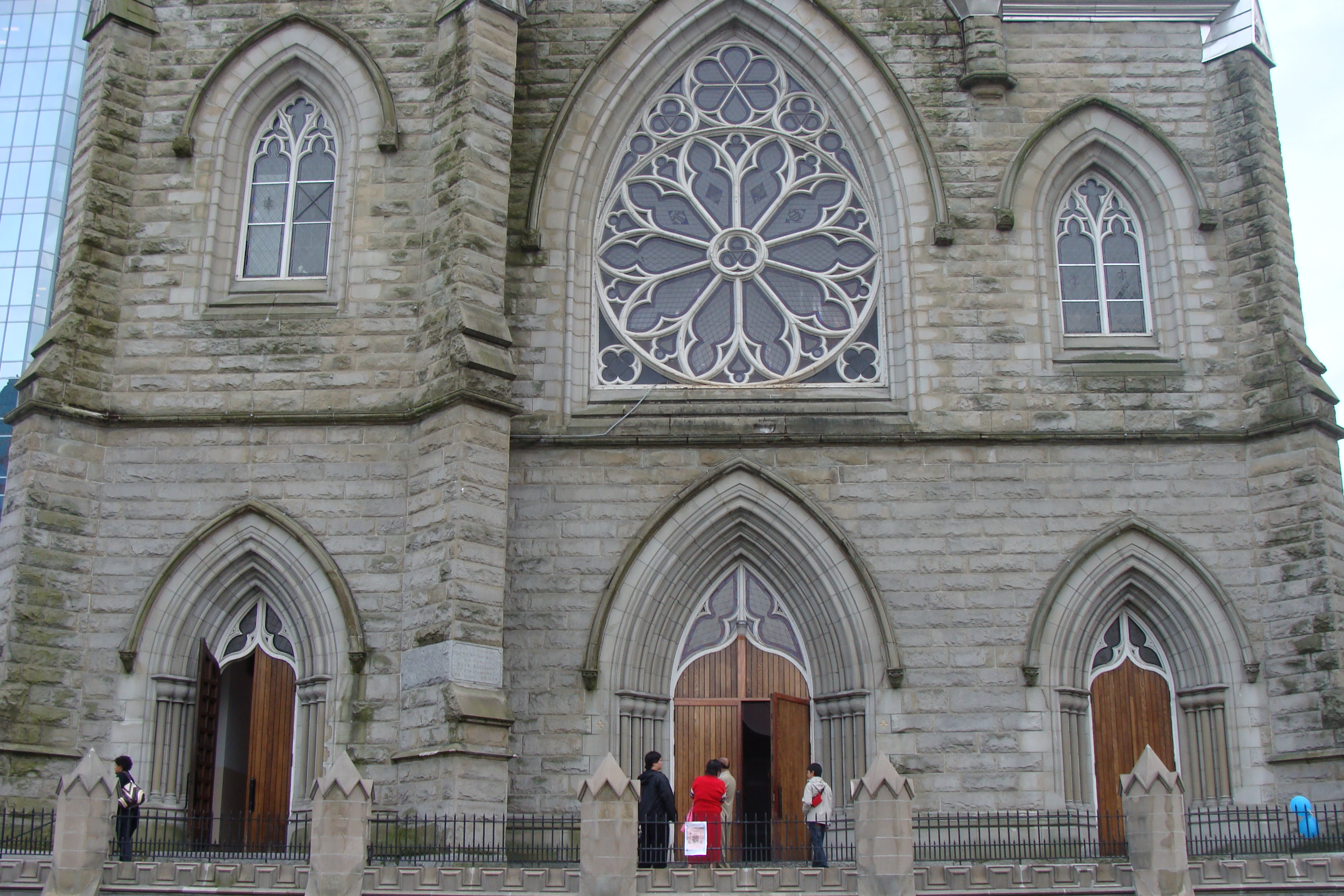
Stained glass in Holy Rosary Cathedral (Vancouver)

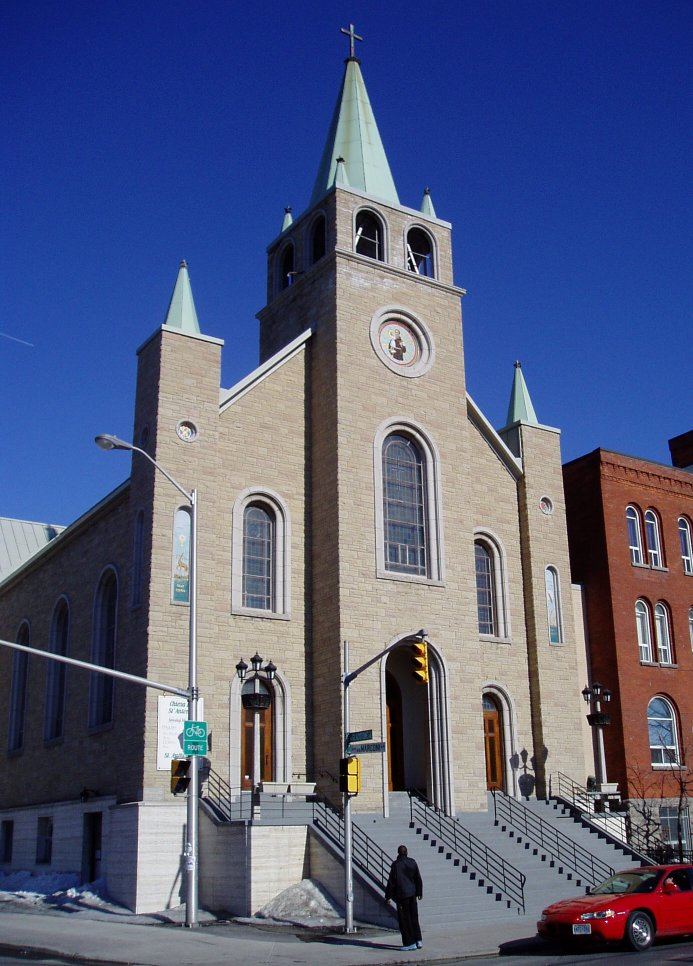
St. Anthony of Padua (Ottawa)

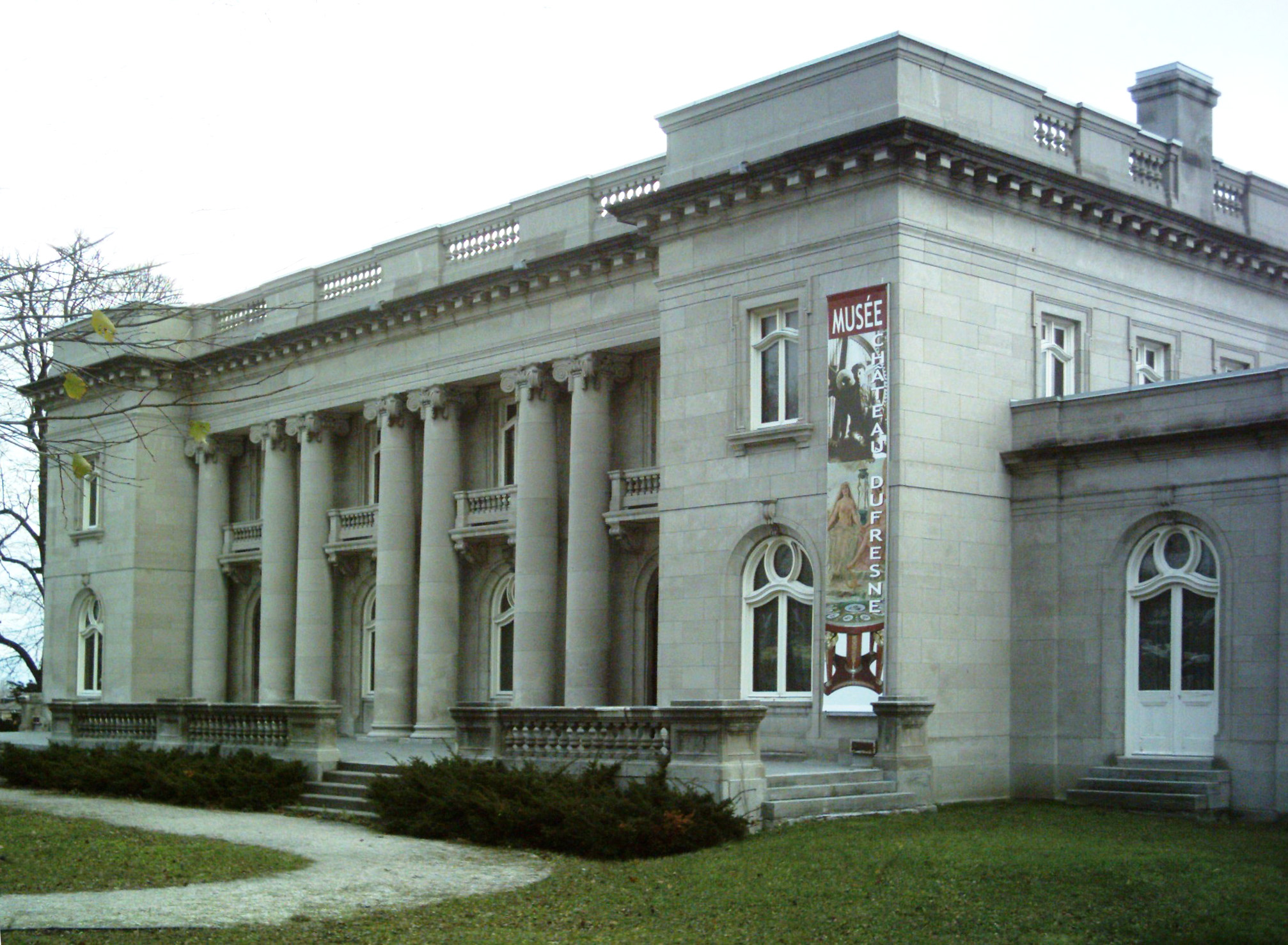
Château Dufresne in Montreal, Quebec

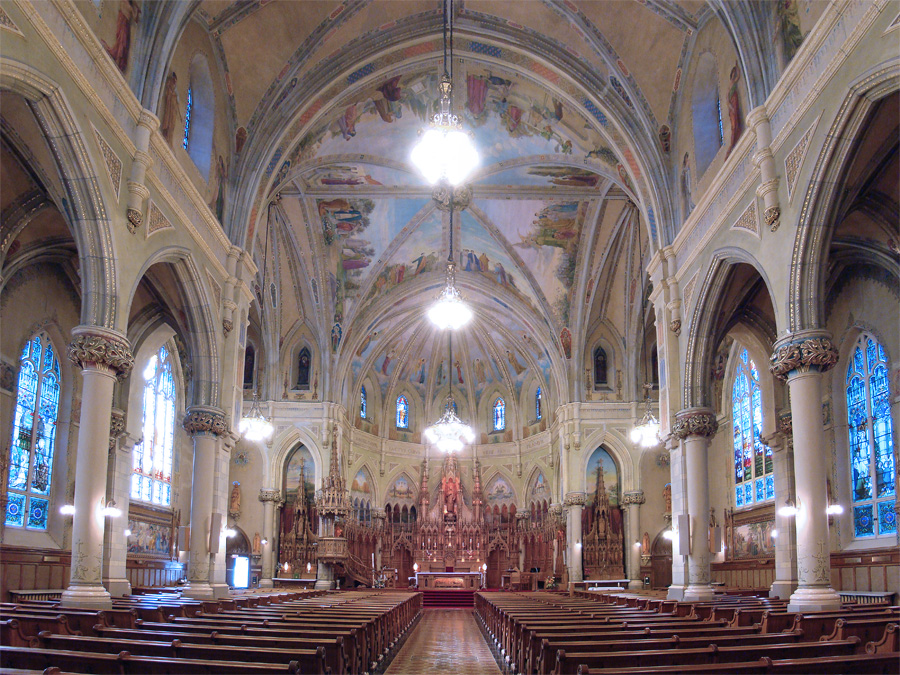
Interior decoration of Église Saint-Viateur d'Outremont in Montreal, Quebec

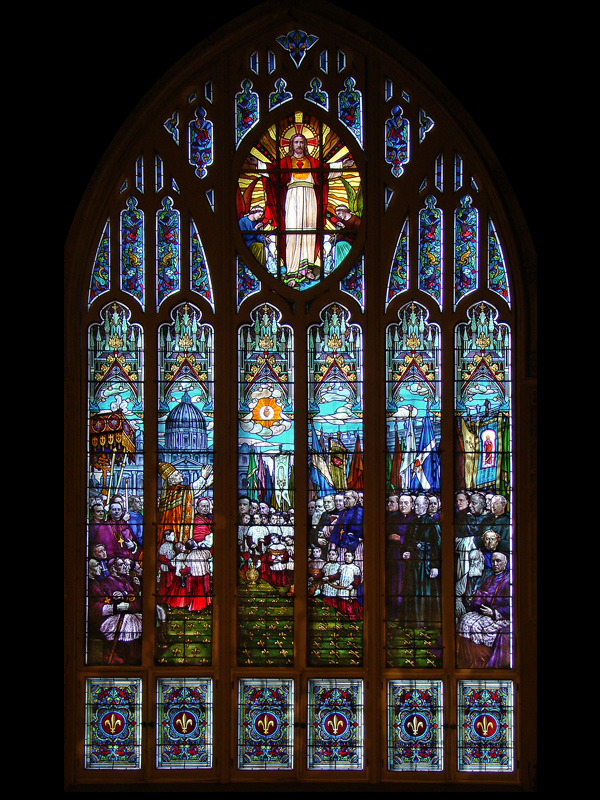
Interior decoration of Église Saint-Viateur d'Outremont in Montreal, Quebec

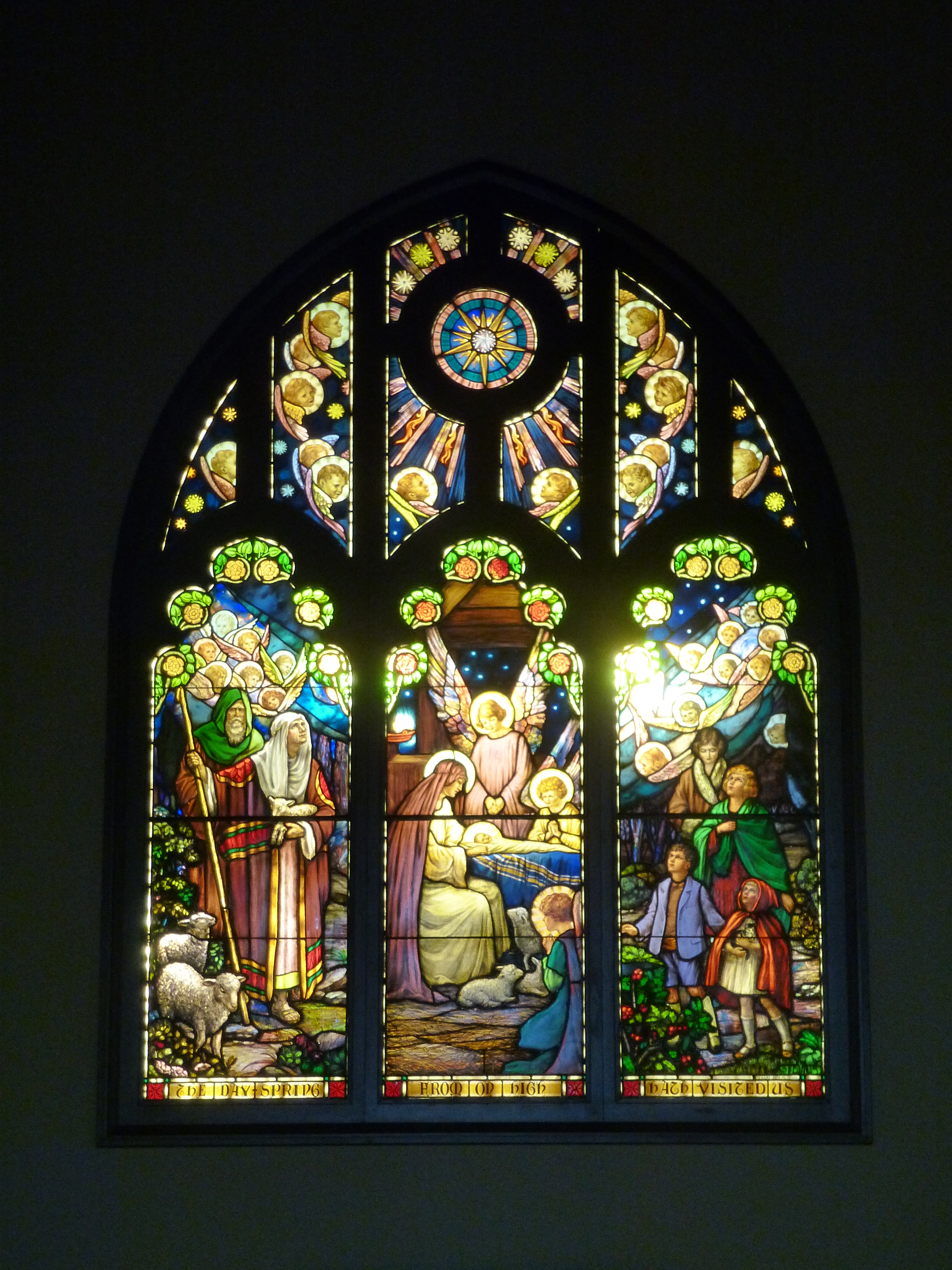
Nativity window from St John the Evangelist Anglican Church in Prescott, Ontario

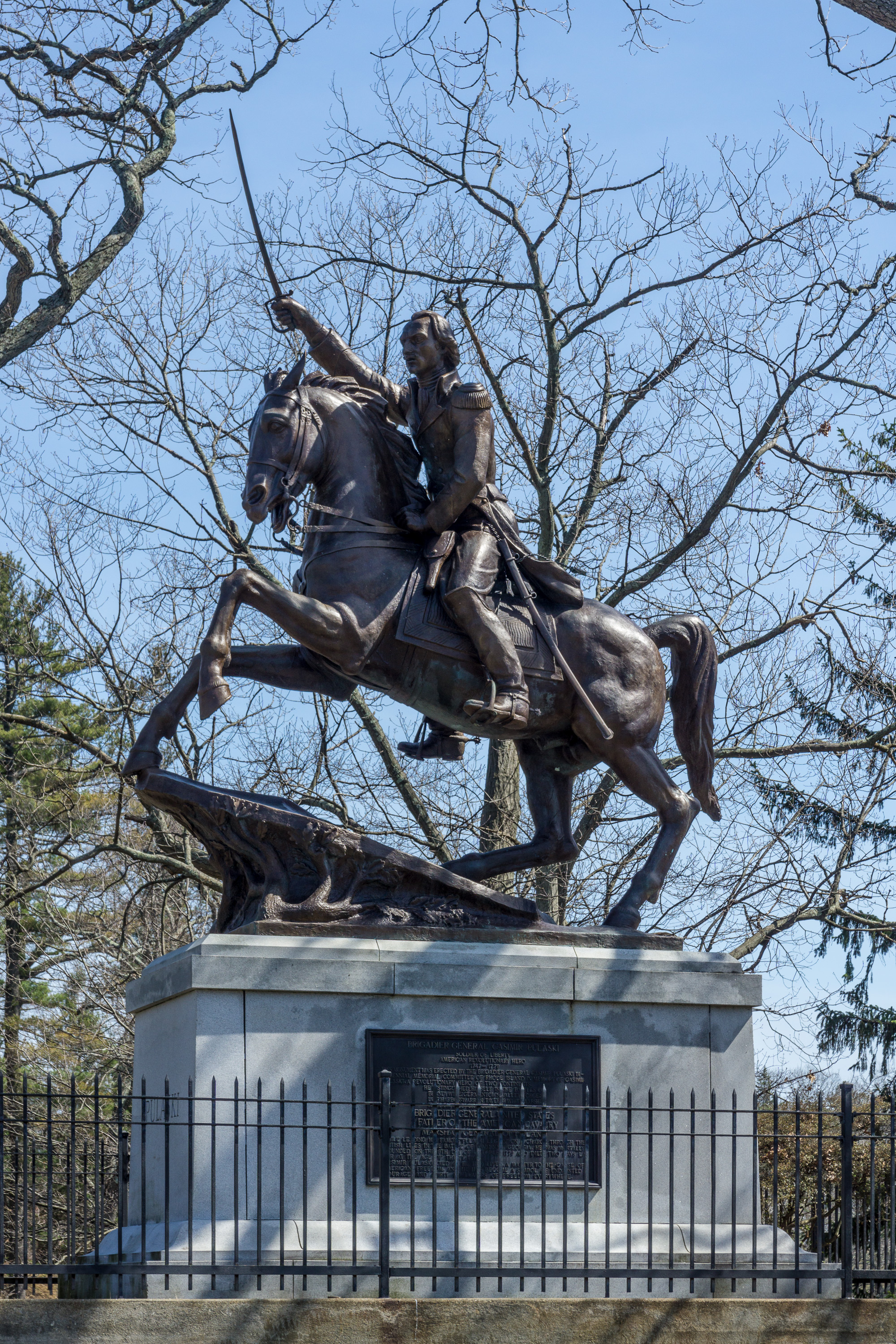
Statue of Casimir Pulaski in Roger Williams Park
