= Château Dufresne =

Historic building in Montreal, Quebec, Canada

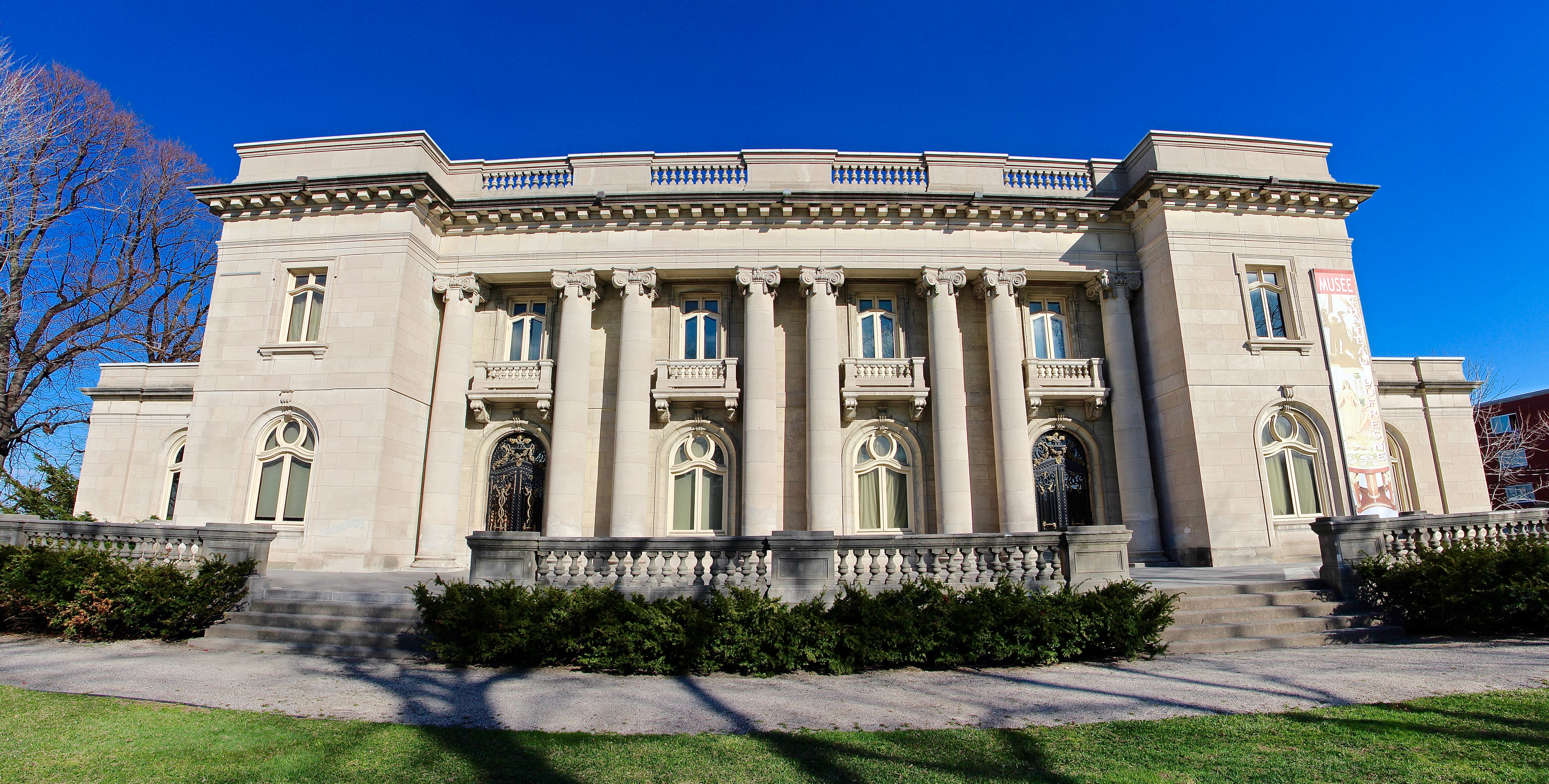

- Location within Quebec

General information
- Type: Historic house museum
- Architectural style: Beaux-Arts
- Location: 4040 Sherbrooke Street east Montreal, Quebec; H1W 3W2, Canada
- Coordinates: 45.553885°N 73.553818°W
- Current tenants: Dufresne-Nincheri Museum
- Construction started: 1915
- Completed: 1918
- Client: Marius and Oscar Dufresne

Dimensions
- Other dimensions: Grounds: 7,134 m^{2}

Technical details
- Floor count: 3 floors, 40 rooms
- Floor area: 1,809 m^{2}

Design and construction
- Architects: Marius Dufresne and Jules Renard

Patrimoine culturel du Québec
- Designated: 1976

The Château Dufresne (French pronunciation: [ʃato dyfʁɛn]; also known as the Dufresne House) is a historic building in the borough of Mercier–Hochelaga-Maisonneuve in Montreal, Quebec, Canada. It currently functions as a historic house museum.

== History ==
Built from 1915 to 1918, the mansion was designed by Marius Dufresne and the Parisian architect Jules Renard in the Beaux-Arts style. The architects based their plans on the Petit Trianon on the grounds of the Palace of Versailles in France. The building has forty rooms covering about 20,000 square feet.

The interior was decorated with a series of murals and ceiling paintings by Guido Nincheri in the 1920s and 1930s. Known for his piety and devout religious leanings, the secular subject matter of the Château Dufresne's interior decor is an exception to the rest of Nincheri's artistic career. Alfred Faniel, a Belgian-born artist, also decorated the house during the same period.

The mansion was built as the residence of Marius Dufresne and Oscar Dufresne, two wealthy French Canadian entrepreneurs who played a major role in the history of the city of Maisonneuve (now part of Montreal). The Château Dufresne was originally divided into two separate households, one for each brother. In 1948, the Dufresne family sold the property to the Congregation of the Holy Cross, which used it as a pavilion annex of the Holy Cross College.

In 1957, the City of Montreal became the new owner of the estate. The Holy Cross College, however, remained as tenant until 1961. The mansion then housed the Montreal Museum of Contemporary Art from 1965 to 1968, and the Montreal Museum of Decorative Arts from 1976 to 1997.

The Château Dufresne was declared a historic monument by the Quebec government in 1976. Beginning in 1999, the building has housed the Château Dufresne Museum, which was renamed the Dufresne-Nincheri Museum in 2014.

== Location ==
Château Dufresne is located at 4040, rue Sherbrooke Est (4040, Sherbrooke Street East), adjacent to the Olympic Stadium and Montreal Botanical Garden, near the Pie-IX metro station. Château Dufresne is situated at an altitude of 35 m.

== Affiliations ==
The museum is affiliated with the CMA, CHIN, and Virtual Museum of Canada.

== Gallery ==
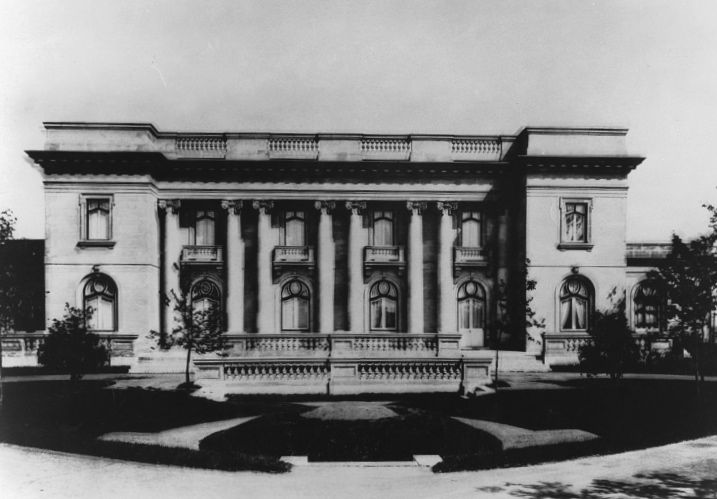
Château Dufresne in the 1910s

Château Dufresne from Pie-IX Boulevard, 1936

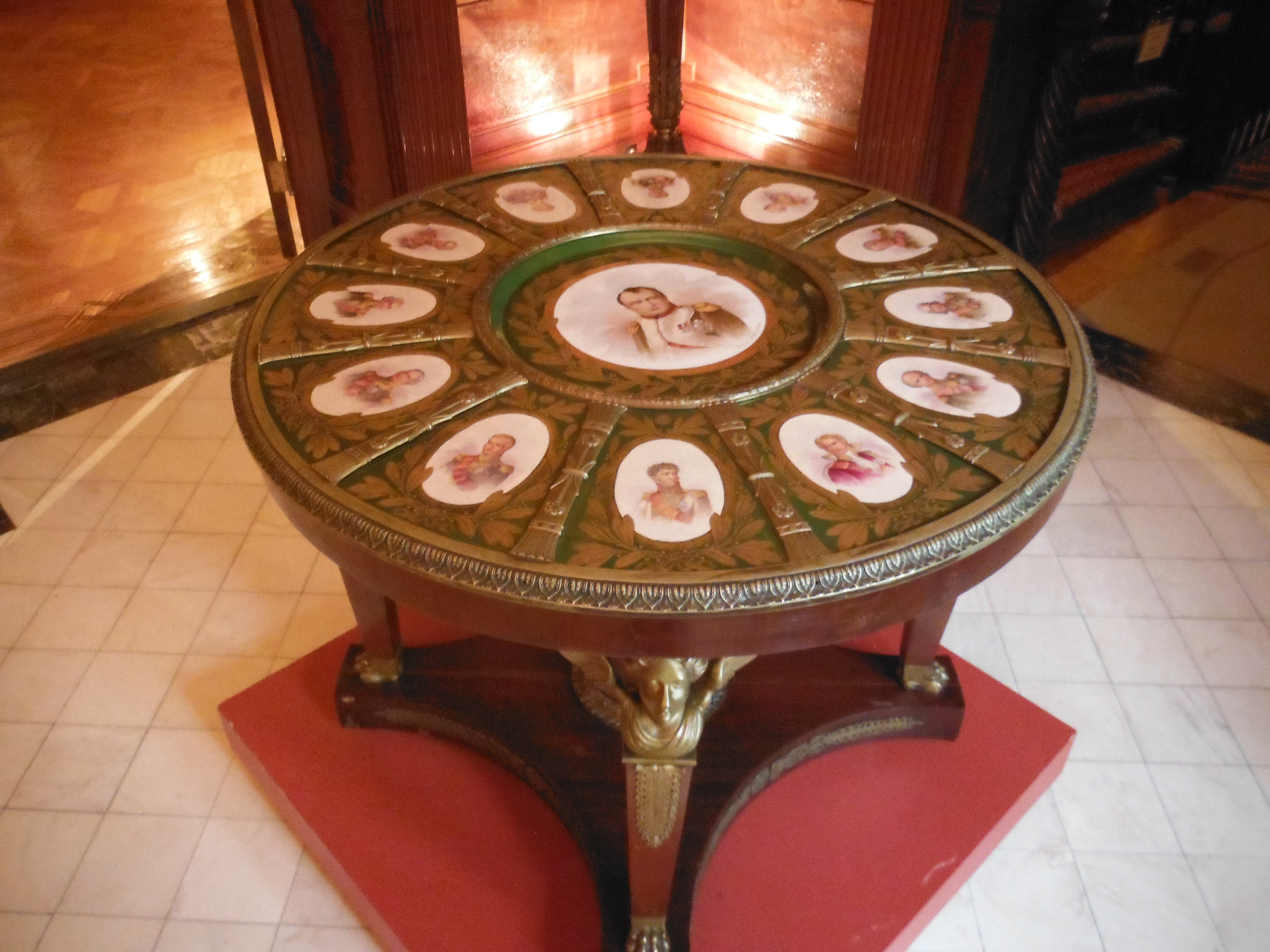
Replica of the Table of Austerlitz (Hall)

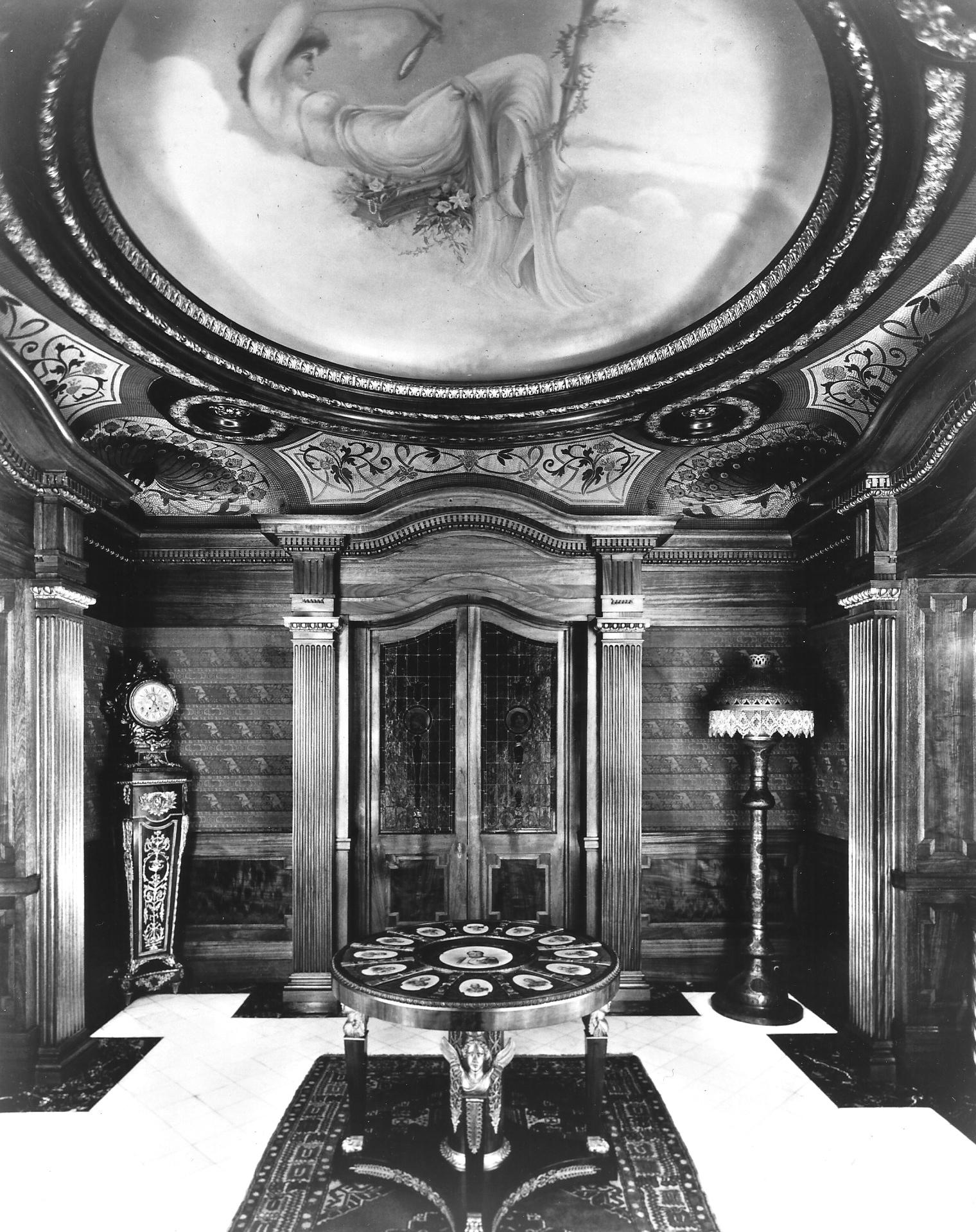
Hall, Marius Dufresne's House

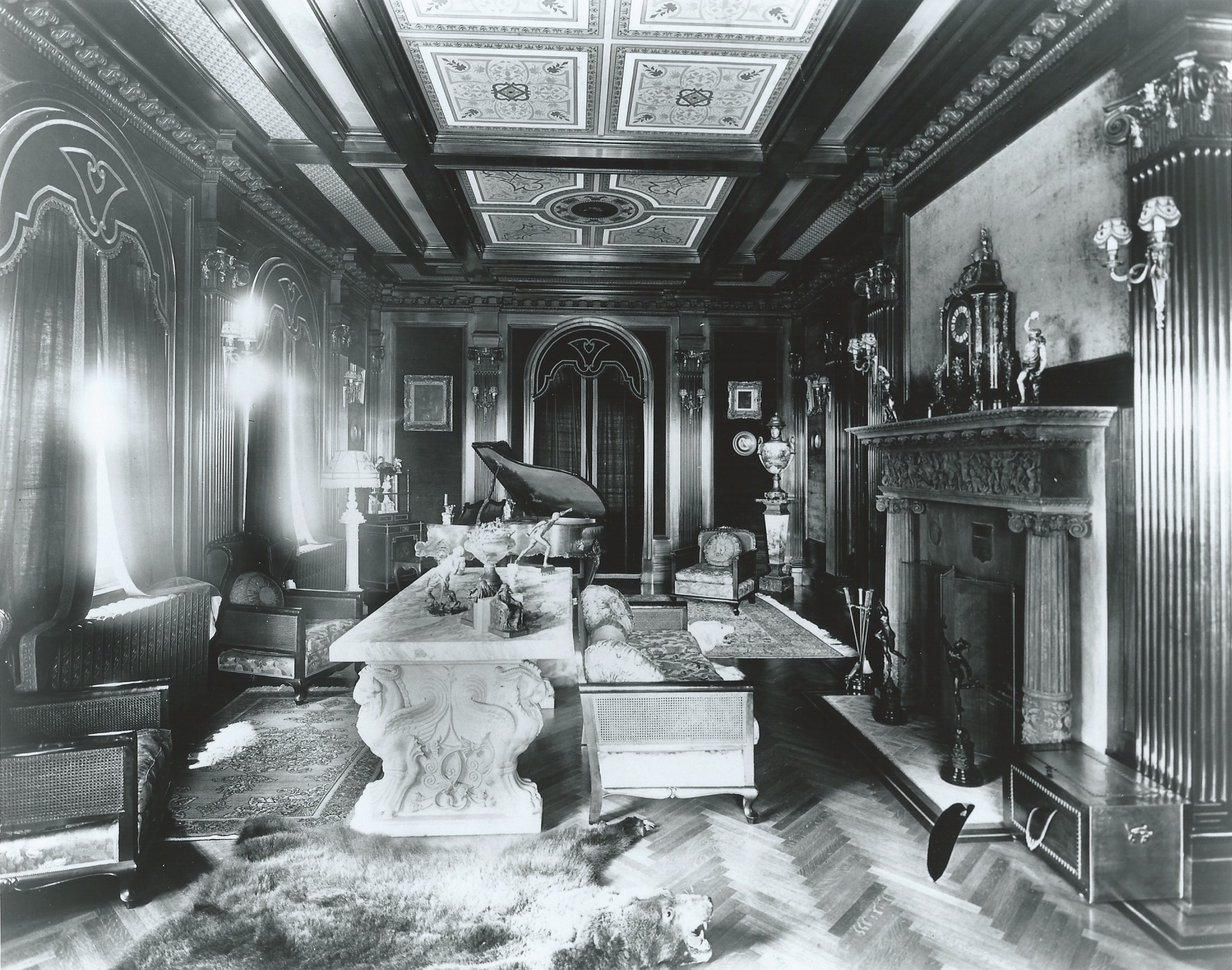
Drawing room, Marius Dufresne's House

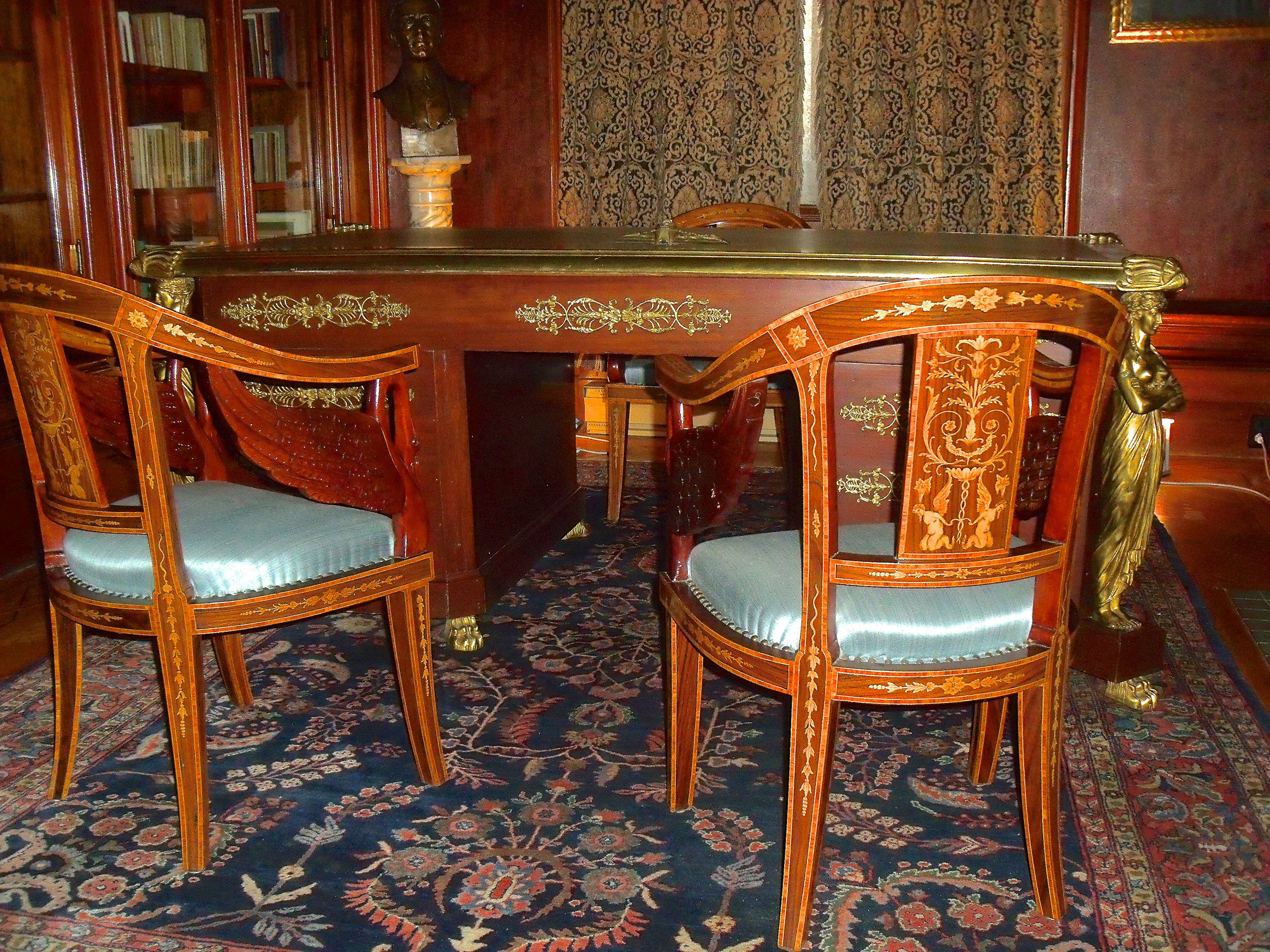
Empire style desk and two Restauration style fauteuils (Library)

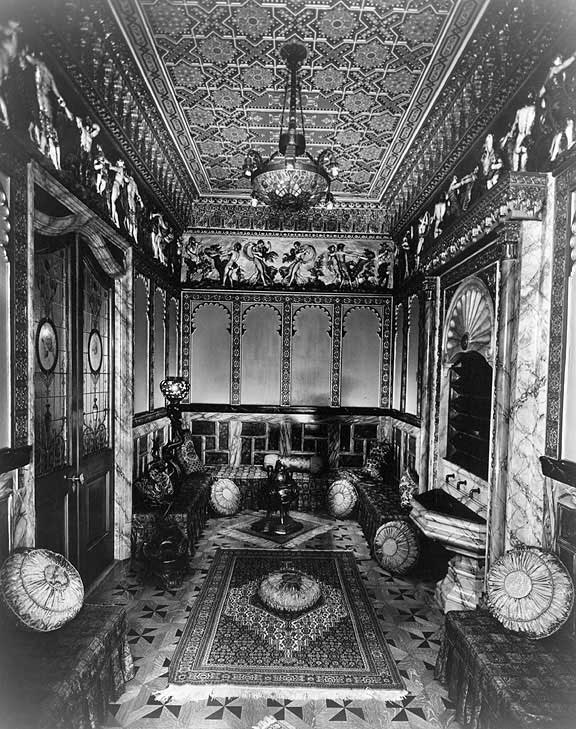
Turkish room, Marius Dufresne's House

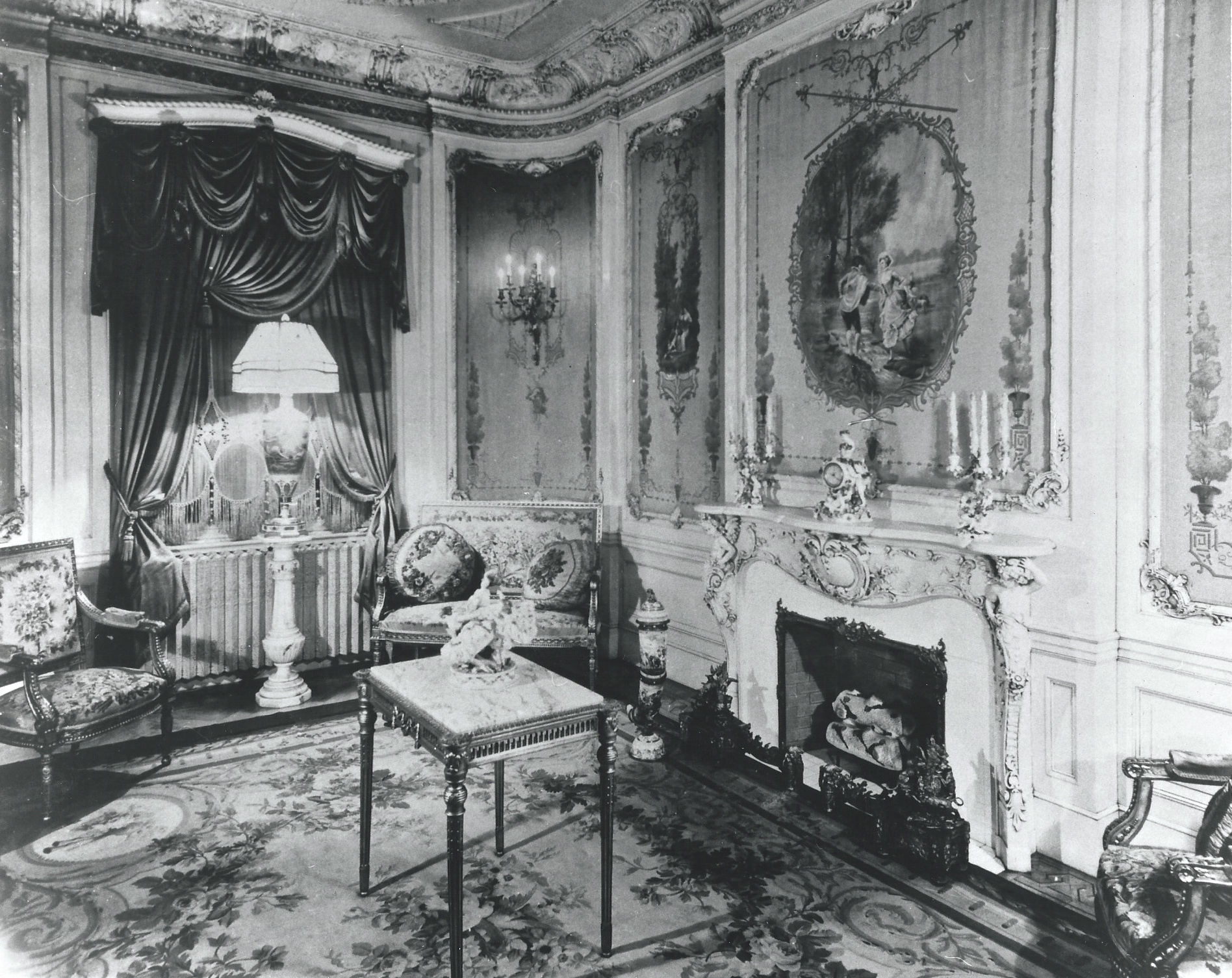
Ladies' sitting room, Marius Dufresne's House

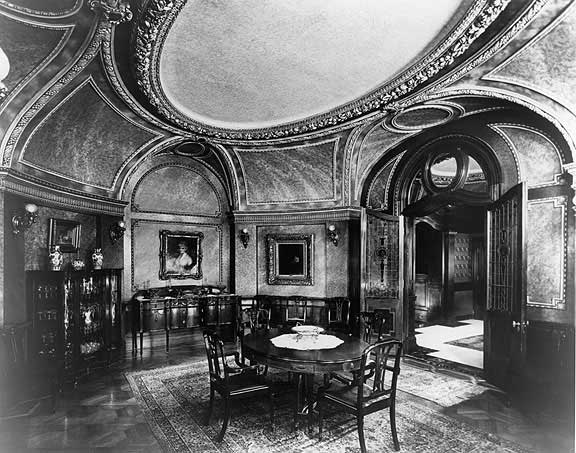
Dining room, Marius Dufresne's House

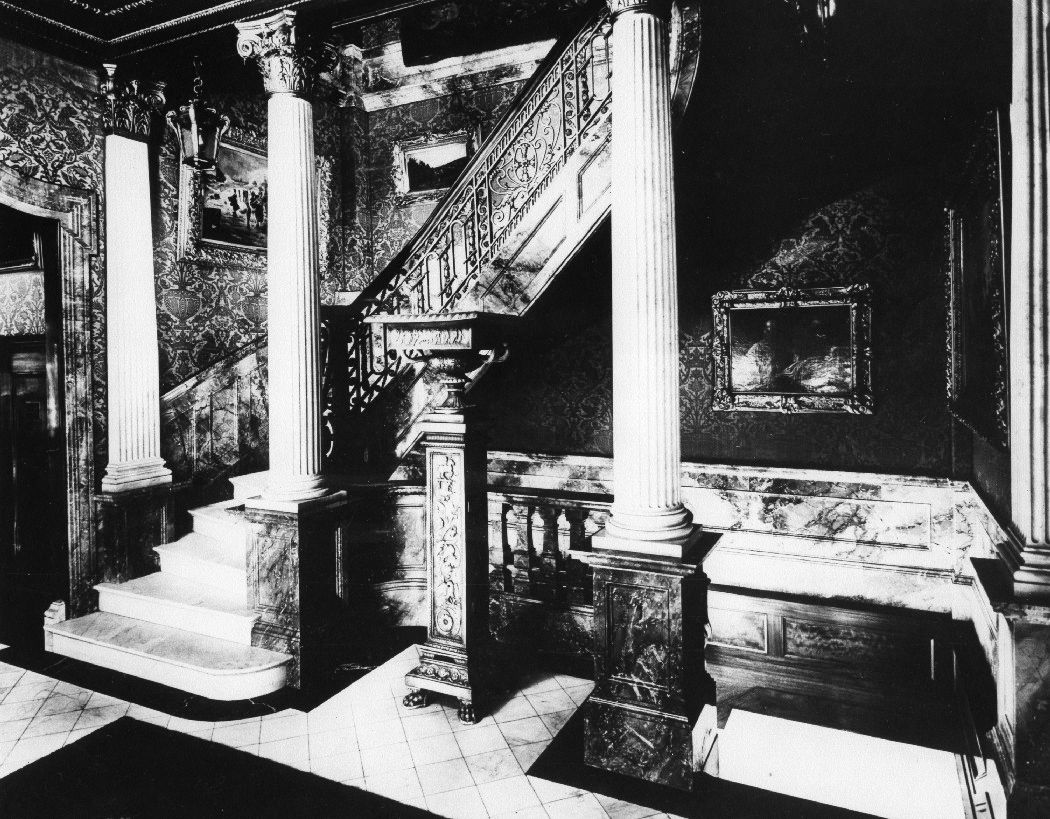
Oscar's Hall

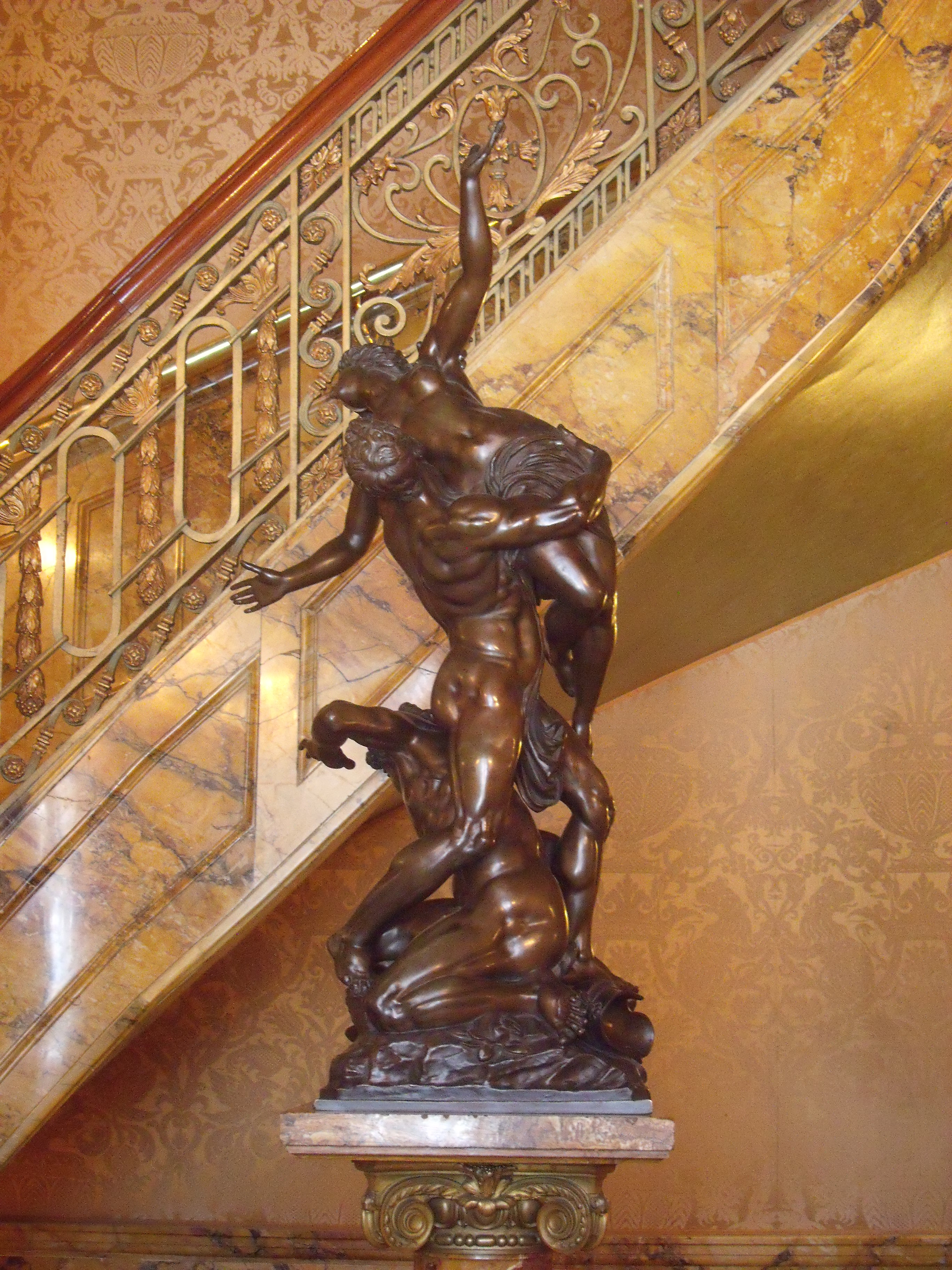
Replica of The Rape of the Sabine Women by Jean Boulogne

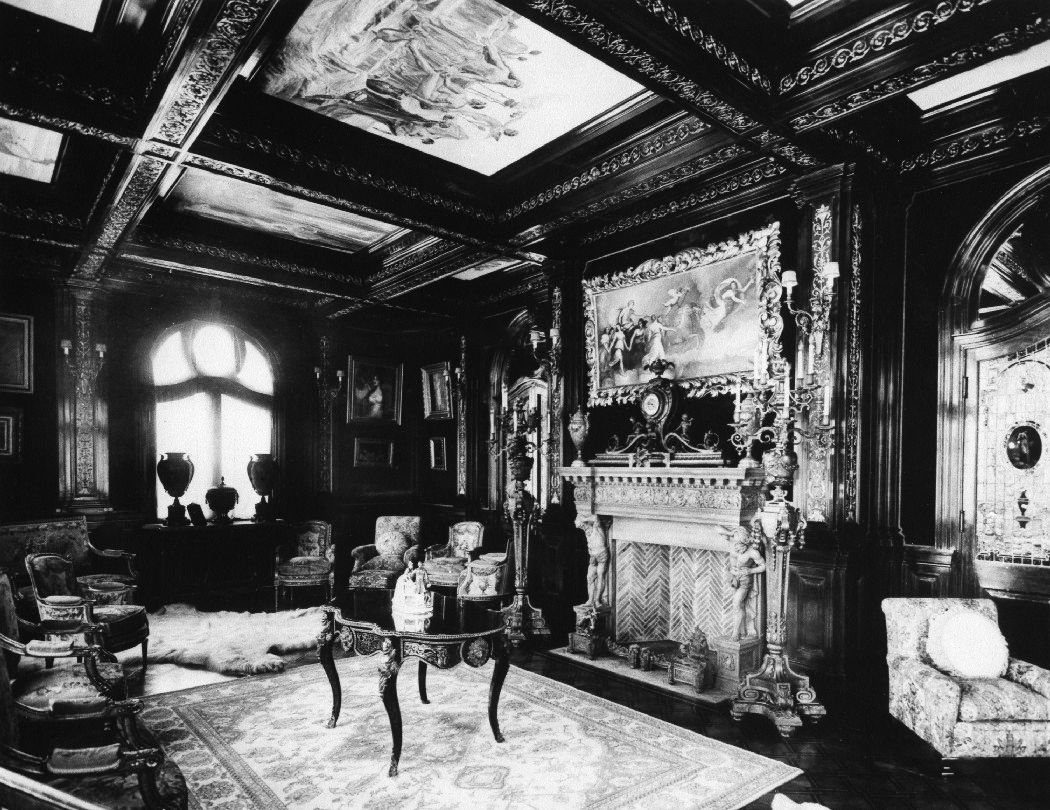
Oscar's Drawing room

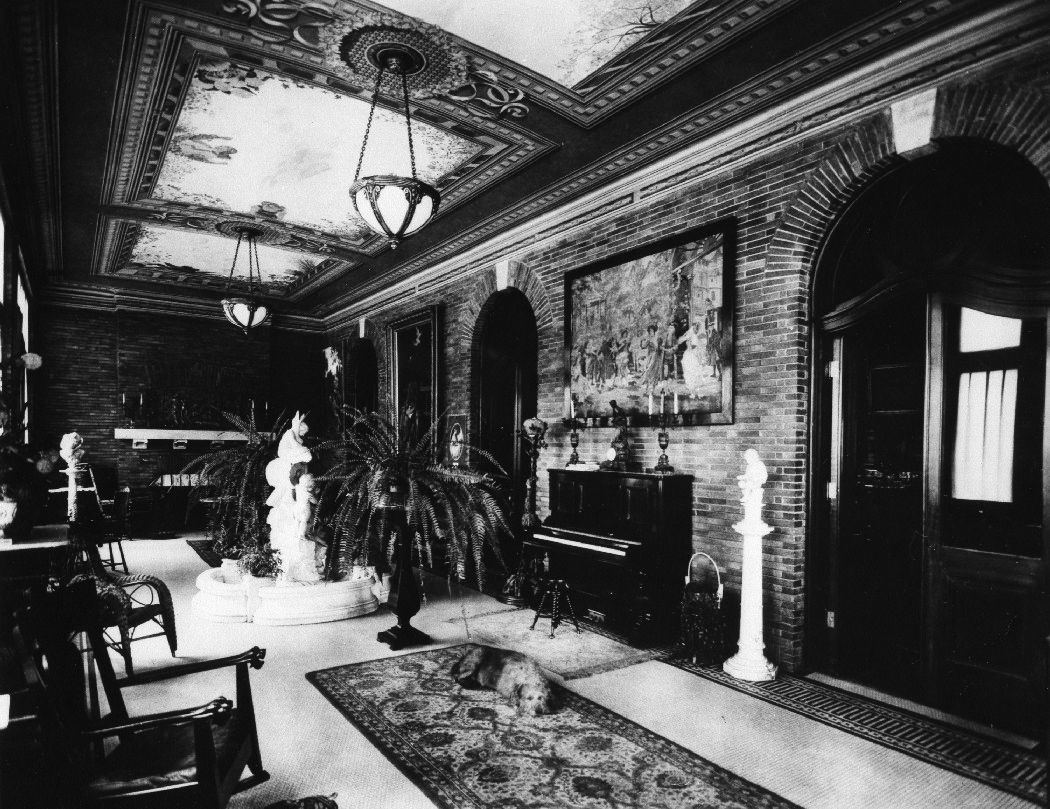
Oscar's Solarium

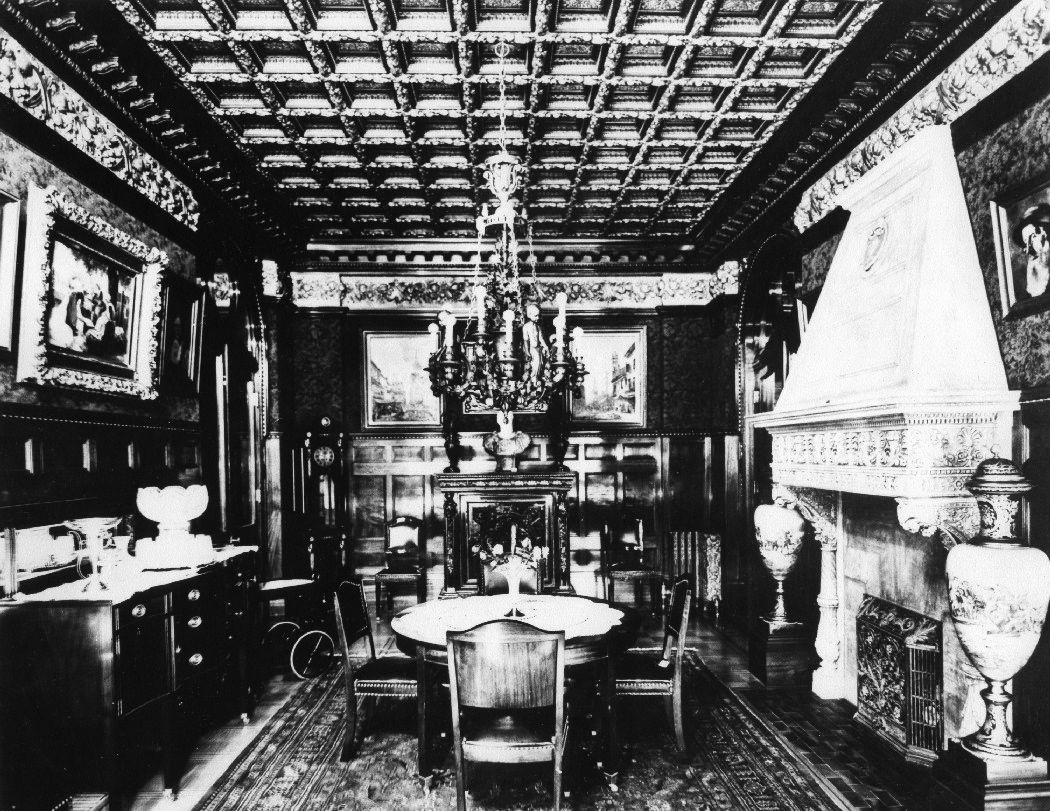
Oscar's Dining room

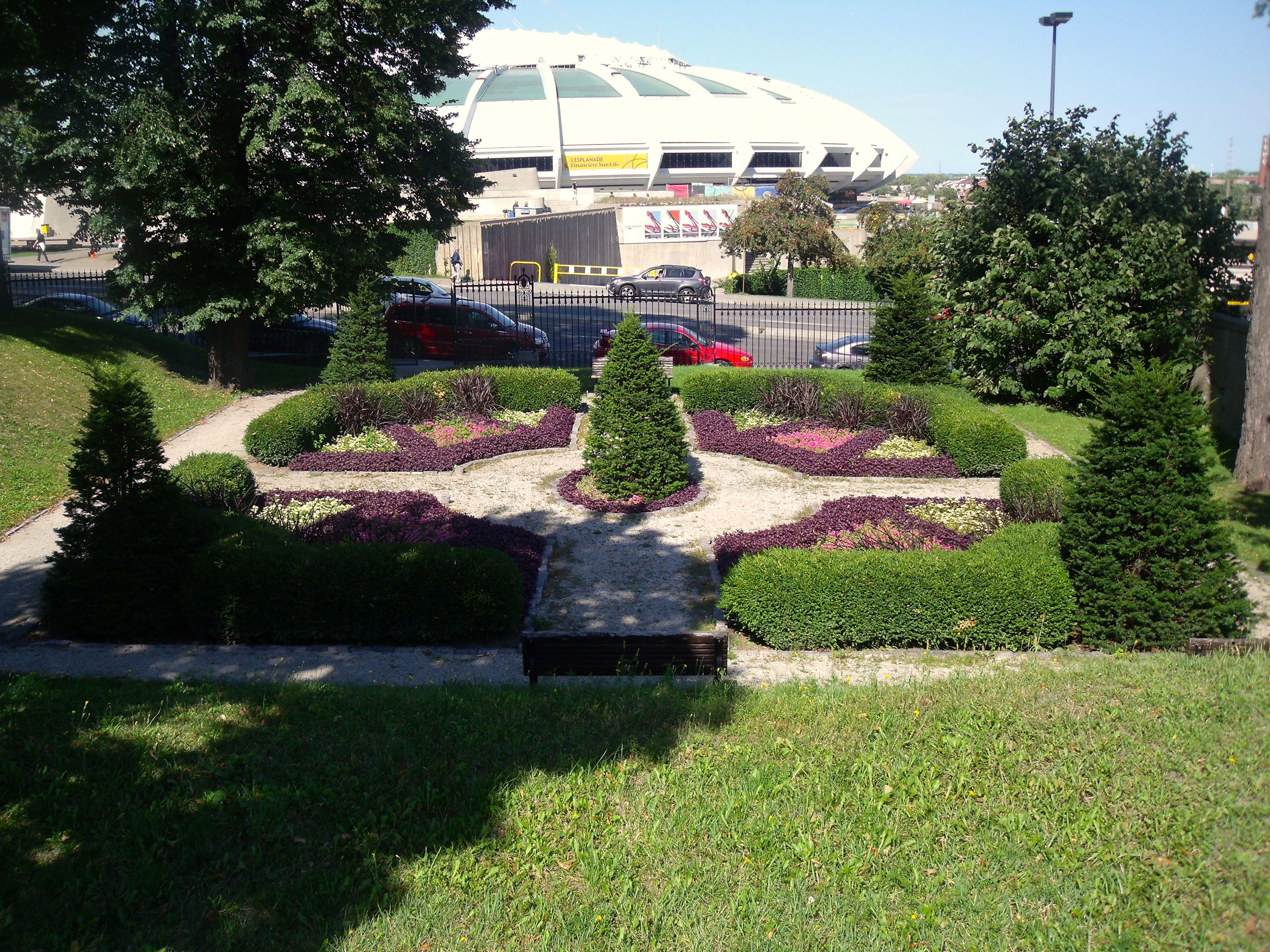
French Garden
