= Saint-Viateur d'Outremont Church =

Church building in Outremont, Montreal, Quebec

Coordinates: 45.5170°N 73.5990°W

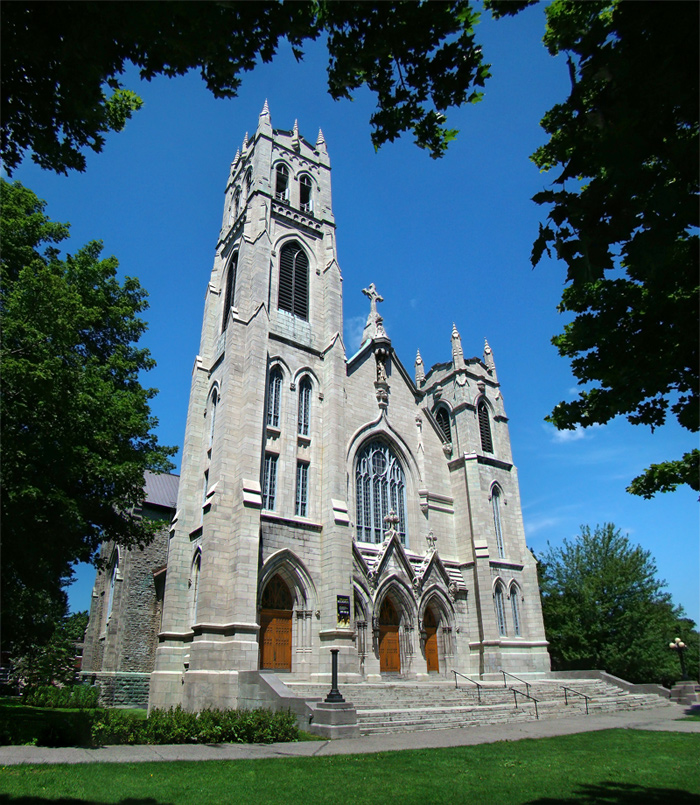
Saint-Viateur d'Outremont Church.

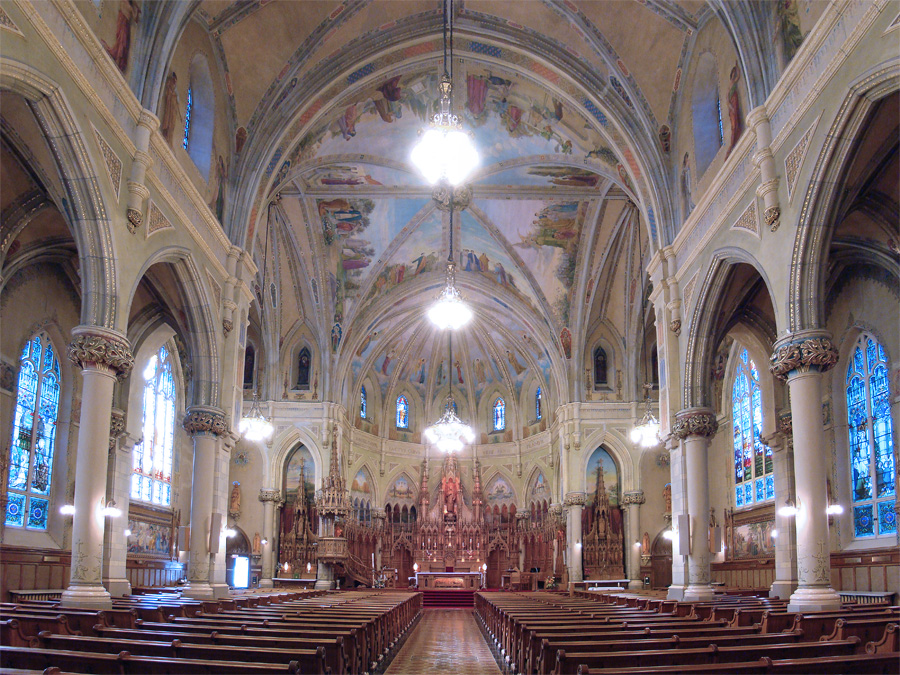
The interior.

St-Viateur d'Outremont Church (French: Église Saint-Viateur d'Outremont) is a Roman Catholic church in the borough of Outremont in Montreal, Quebec, Canada. Its address is 183 Bloomfield Avenue, at the corner of Laurier Avenue West.

== History ==
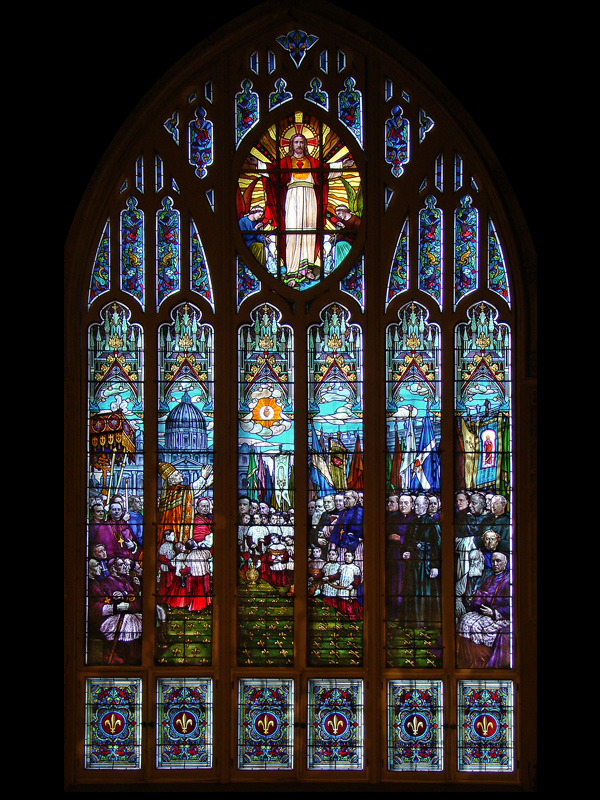
The stained glass windows by Guido Nincheri.

Saint-Viateur d'Outremont Church was built in 1911 in the wake of the 1910 Eucharistic Congress of Montreal. It was built in what was then the first parish of Outremont. This church marked the separation from the neighboring parish of Saint-Louis du Mile-End.

The architects were Louis-Zéphirin Gauthier and Joseph-Égilde-Césaire Daoust. Constructed in the Gothic Revival style, the building features very slender arches. The church was decorated by Guido Nincheri who also signed the windows.

The ceremony of the blessing of Saint-Viateur d'Outremont Church, was held October 26, 1913.

The woodwork is oak, the work of Philibert Lemay, and the original statues were made of plaster. In 1950, the sculptor Médard Bourgault was invited to replace them with wooden statues that now represent one of the attractions of this church.

The organ of Saint-Viateur was built in 1913 by Casavant Frères. Its restoration was conducted in the early 1990s.
