= Pierre Jamet =

French harpist and pedagogue (1893–1991)

Pierre Jamet (21 April 1893 in Orléans – 17 June 1991 in Gargilesse-Dampierre) was a French harpist and pedagogue. A pupil of Alphonse Hasselmans at the Conservatoire de Paris, he became professor of harp there from 1948 to 1963, succeeding Marcel Tournier.

He is the father of harpist Marie-Claire Jamet.

== Selected discography ==
- Les Introuvables de Manuel de Falla, 4CD, EMI, 1996. With Victoria de Los Angeles, Aldo Ciccolini, Consuelo Rubio and Ana-Maria Iriarte.
- Jean-Philippe Rameau, Rossignols amoureux, extract of Hippolyte et Aricie, with soprano Leïla Ben Sedira, 78 rpm, 1940.
- Hommage à Albert Roussel, 33 rpm, Decca, 1958. With Christiane Verzieux, José Maria Sierra and Christian Lardé.
- Concerto en si bémol majeur pour harpe et orchestre by Haendel/Impromptu op. 86 de Gabriel Fauré/Impromptu op. 21 by Albert Roussel, 33 rpm, Decca
