= Christian Lardé =

French musician (1930–2012)

- Born: Christian Pierre Lardé-Maurin; 3 February 1930; 12th arrondissement of Paris, France
- Died: 16 November 2012 (aged 82) Draguignan, France
- Genres: Classical; Chamber
- Occupations: Flautist; Pedagogue
- Instrument: Flute
- Formerly of: Quintette Marie-Claire Jamet; Paris Instrumental Quartet
- Spouse: Marie-Claire Jamet

Christian Pierre Lardé-Maurin (3 February 1930 – 16 November 2012) was a French classical flautist and pedagogue. He was the husband of harpist Marie-Claire Jamet.

== Biography ==
Lardé was born in the twelfth arrondissement of Paris on 3 February 1930. He studied flute and chamber music under Gaston Crunelle at the city's Conservatoire de Paris, winning first prizes in flute (in 1948) and in chamber music (in 1951). In 1949, Lardé was appointed as principal flautist at the National Symphony Orchestra of Ireland, and obtained second prize in the 1951 Geneva International Music Competition.

He was married to harpist and composer Marie-Claire Jamet (daughter of Pierre Jamet) and formed the Quintette Marie-Claire Jamet with her in 1959, alongside Jamet herself as harpist and a string trio. The group primarily specialised in contemporary music. He served as a member until they disbanded in 1976, and from there he moved to the Paris Instrumental Quintet.

Lardé's North American concert début (he regularly gave concerts in Canada and the United States) was in 1956.

In 1970, Lardé was employed as professor by the Conservatoire de Paris to teach chamber music, following a previous appointment to teach flute at the Conservatoire de Montréal the last year; he retired from both in 1995. He also gave masterclasses at the Académie musicale de Villecroze from 1981 to 1993, but also returned to hold them in 1995, 1997, 2000, 2007, and 2009.

Lardé died in Draguignan (Var, Provence-Alpes-Côte d'Azur) on 16 November 2012, aged 82.
