= Victor Jamet =

French mathematician (1853–1919)

Émile Victor Jamet (19 December 1853, Mèze, Hérault – 4 August 1919, Nice) was a French mathematician.

== Education and career ==
After study at ENS, Jamet became on 19 September 1876 a lecturer in mathematics at the lycée de Saint-Brieuc. On 21 September 1877 he became a professor of mathematics at the lycée de Nice. On 24 October 1878 he became a lecturer, with the title of substitute teacher, having the duties of a professor of mathematics at the lycée de Toulouse. On 6 September 1879 he became a professor of mathematics at the lycée de Pau. On 10 September 1881 he became a professor of mathematics at the lycée de Nantes. On 30 August 1889 he became a professor of mathematics at the lycée de Marseille and taught preparatory classes for the École centrale de Marseille. On 1 January 1915 he became a professor of mathématiques spéciales at the lycée de Nice and retired there in 1918.

On 20 February 1908, he was elected a member of l’Académie des sciences, lettres et beaux-arts de Marseille in the section of physical sciences, as successor to the physicist Jules Macé de Lépinay (born 1851, died 1904, graduated ENS 1872).

Jamet passed his agrégation in mathematics in 1877. He received his doctorate in mathematical sciences on 28 October 1887 from the University of Paris with thesis Sur les courbes et les surfaces tétraèdralex with thesis committee consisting of Darboux (chair), Picard, and Poincaré.

Jamet was an Invited Speaker at the ICM in 1900 in Paris.

== Selected publications ==
- "Sur une application des déterminants." Nouvelles annales de mathématiques, journal des candidates aux écoles polytechnique et normale 16 (1877): 372–373.
- "Sur une classe de surfaces du quatrième ordre." Nouvelles annales de mathématiques, journal des candidates aux écoles polytechnique et normale 20 (1881): 434–443.
- "Sur les surfaces et les courbes tétraédrales symétriques." In Annales Scientifiques de l'École Normale Supérieure, vol. 4, pp. 3–78. Société mathématique de France, 1887.
- "Sur le rapport anharmonique d'une courbe du troisième ordre." Bulletin de la Société Mathématique de France 15 (1887): 35–38.
- "Sur la décomposition des fractions rationnelles en fractions simples." Nouvelles annales de mathématiques, journal des candidats aux écoles polytechnique et normale 8 (1889): 228–232.
- "Sur la théorie des sphères osculatrices à une courbe." In Annales de la Faculté des Sciences de Toulouse: Mathématiques, vol. 4, no. 1, pp. 1–8. 1890.
- "Sur les périodes des intégrales elliptiques." Nouvelles annales de mathématiques, journal des candidats aux écoles polytechnique et normale 10 (1891): 193–196.
- "Sur le nombre e." Nouvelles annales de mathématiques, journal des candidats aux écoles polytechnique et normale 10 (1891): 215–218.
- "Sur les séries à termes positifs." Nouvelles annales de mathématiques, journal des candidats aux écoles polytechnique et normale 11 (1892): 99–103.
- "Sur le théorème de d'Alembert." Nouvelles annales de mathématiques, journal des candidats aux écoles polytechnique et normale 14 (1895): 437–442.
- "Sur une équation aux dérivées partielles." In Annales Scientifiques de l'École Normale Supérieure, vol. 13, pp. 95–106. 1896.
- "Sur les invariants de la forme biquadratique binaire." Nouvelles annales de mathématiques, journal des candidats aux écoles polytechnique et normale 19 (1900): 419–427.
- "Sur la théorie des forces centrales." Nouvelles annales de mathématiques, journal des candidats aux écoles polytechnique et normale 2 (1902): 348–367.
- "Sur les intégrales de Fresnel." Nouvelles annales de mathématiques, journal des candidats aux écoles polytechnique et normale 3 (1903): 357–359.
- "Sur une propriété de la parabole." Nouvelles annales de mathématiques, journal des candidats aux écoles polytechnique et normale 5 (1905): 411-413.
- "Sur l'équation aux dérivées partielles des surfaces réglées." Nouvelles annales de mathématiques, journal des candidats aux écoles polytechnique et normale 10 (1910): 501–506.
- "Sur les réseaux conjugués." Nouvelles annales de mathématiques, journal des candidats aux écoles polytechnique et normale 13 (1913): 388–394.
