= Marie-Claire Jamet =

French classical harpist

Marie-Claire Jamet (born 27 November 1933 in Reims) is a French classical harpist.

== Biography ==
Marie-Claire Jamet is the daughter of Pierre Jamet, also a harpist.

After winning the 1st prize of harp and the 1st prize of chamber music at the Conservatoire de Paris, Marie-Claire Jamet was harp solo of the National Orchestra of Radio France, then soloist of the Ensemble Inter-Contemporain directed by Pierre Boulez. She now dedicates herself to her solo activity.

Marie-Claire Jamet has given more than 2000 concerts in the United States, Europe, Japan, India, Russia, Canada, Australia, etc.

She has created numerous works for harp and orchestra, flute and harp, harp alone.

From 1959 to 1978, she also headed the "Marie-Claire Jamet quintet", composed of a flute, a string trio and a harp.

Christian Lardé, José Sanchez, Jacques Dejean, Colette Lequien and Pierre Degenne were also a part of this quintet.

== Discography (partial) ==
- Françaix, Haendel, Debussy, Carl Philipp Emanuel Bach. Récital flute and harp. With Christian Lardé (flute).
- Claude Debussy : l'essentiel de son œuvre. Choirs of the Opéra de Paris, The London Symphony Orchestra and orchestre de la Radio Suisse italienne.
- Mozart. Two concertos for flute. With Christian Lardé. Orchestra under the direction of Paul Kuentz. CD, Arion
- Six danses populaires roumaines. With Christian Lardé. CD, Arion
- Pièce en forme de habanera. With Christian Lardé. Arion Paris
- Maurice Ravel, collection "Sur les traces de…". CD, With Christian Lardé (flute) and Guy Deplus (clarinet). Orchestre national de Paris, under the direction of Manuel Rosenthal. Prelude and fugue
- Romance: les plus beaux airs classiques pour se détendre.

== Honours ==
Marie-Claire Jamet was made a chevalier of the Légion d'honneur 16 March 1995, then an officer 13 July 2012.
