= La Petite-Patrie =

- Neighbourhood
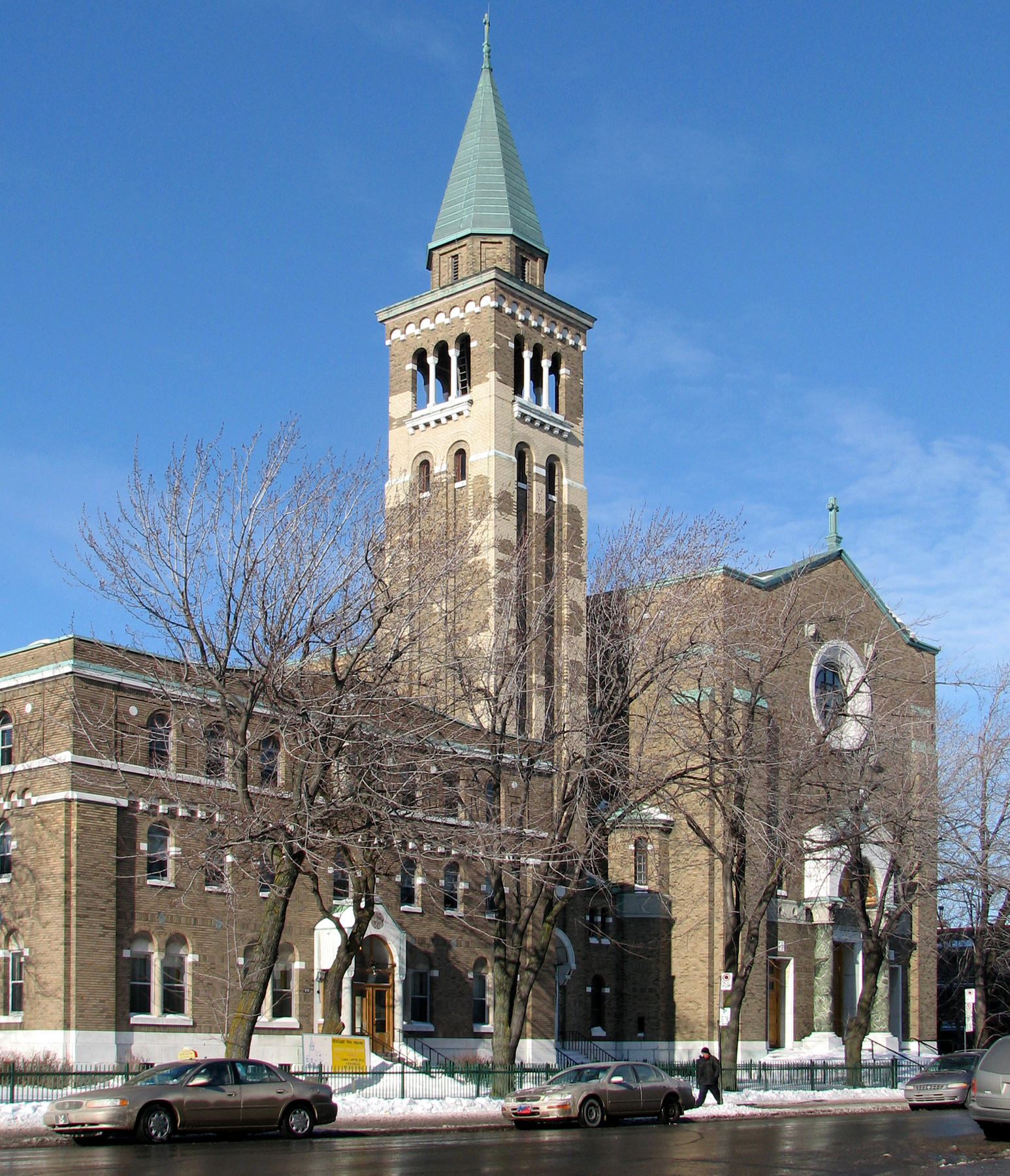
- Saint-Ambroise Church, on Beaubien Street.

- Location of La Petite-Patrie in Montreal
- Coordinates: 45.537798°N 73.601625°W
- Country: Canada
- Province: Quebec
- City: Montreal
- Borough: Rosemont–La Petite-Patrie
- Postal Code: H2G, H2S
- Area codes: 514, 438

La Petite-Patrie (French pronunciation: [la pətit patʁi]) is a neighbourhood of Montreal, Quebec, Canada. It is located in the borough of Rosemont–La Petite-Patrie.

The area is bounded on the west by Hutchison Street, to the north by Jean Talon Street, to the south by the Canadian Pacific Railway tracks, and to the east by d'Iberville Street.

La Petite-Patrie is named after the novel La Petite Patrie by Claude Jasmin, which was published in 1972 and was adapted into television series (La Petite Patrie) shortly afterward.

Originally a working-class neighbourhood, La Petite-Patrie began to gentrify in the early 21st century.

== History ==
Until the late 19th century, La Petite-Patrie was mainly agricultural, with the exception of limestone quarries, now the location of Père Marquette Park.

The construction of a tramway in 1892 linking downtown to Sault-au-Récollet led to the urbanization of the area, which continued until about 1930. It was still a predominantly-residential neighborhood since the only employment was concentrated along the railway, in the workshops of Montreal, or in the Montreal Street Railway.

== Demographics ==
A report by the Centre de santé et de services sociaux (CSSS) du Cœur-de-l'île, the neighborhood's population consists of:

- 44% of single parent families,
- 19% of immigrants (born outside of Canada)
- 10% unemployed,
- 36% of people living below the poverty line

The area includes several ethnic communities, including an Italian community, a Vietnamese community and a Latin American community.

== Transport ==
=== Roads ===
The main roads in La Petite-Patrie include (street directions according to street grid, not geographical):

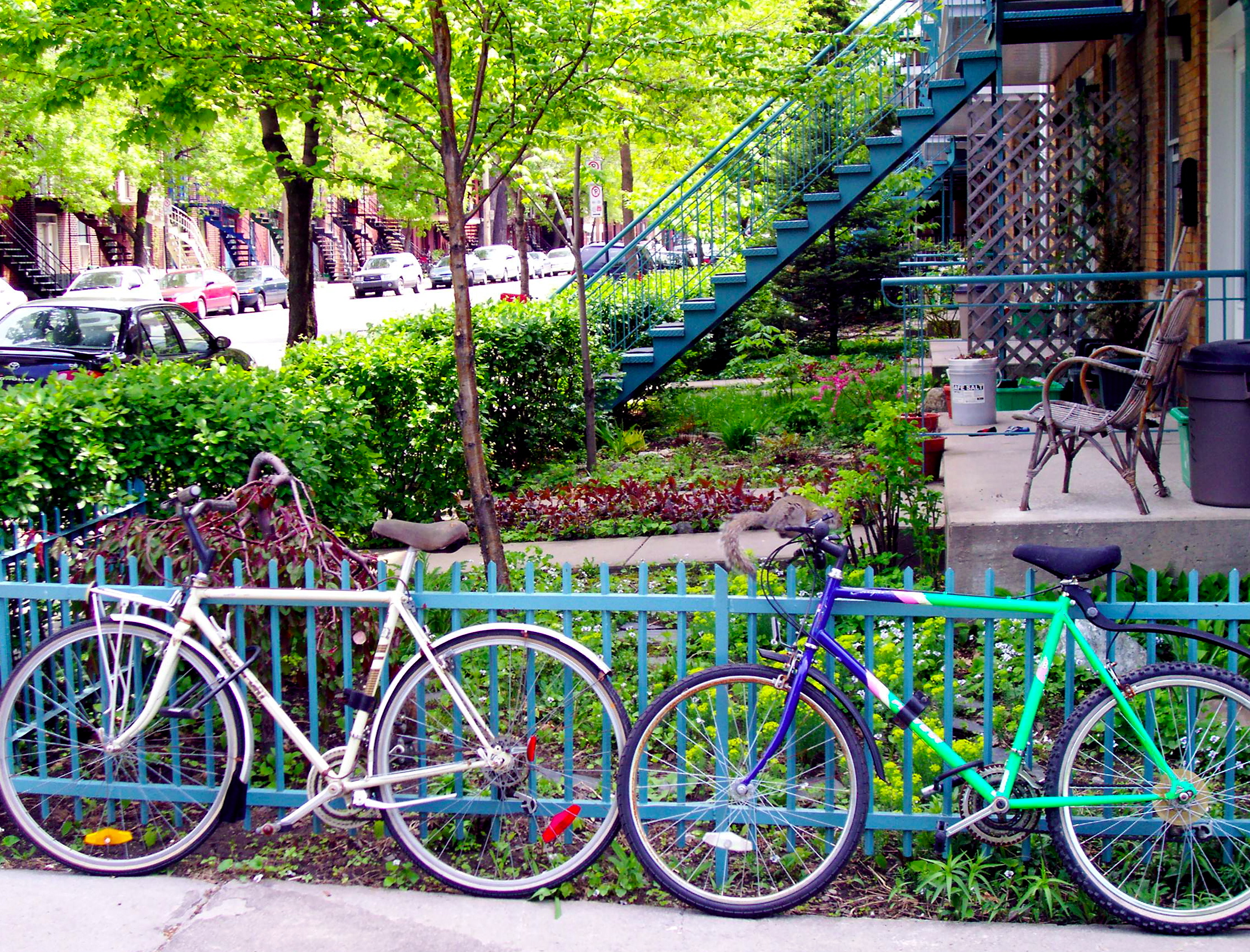
St-Dominique Street (just east of Saint Laurent Boulevard).

- North-South:
  - Park Avenue
  - Saint-Laurent Boulevard
  - Saint-Denis Street
  - Saint-Hubert Street
  - Christophe-Colomb Avenue
  - Papineau Avenue
  - De Lorimier Avenue
- East-West
  - Rosemont Boulevard
  - Bellechasse Street
  - Beaubien Street
  - Saint-Zotique Street
  - Bélanger Street
  - Jean-Talon Street

=== Public transit ===
- The orange line of the Montreal Metro crosses the neighbourhood
  - Rosemont Station
  - Beaubien Station
  - Jean-Talon Station

=== Bicycle paths ===
- La Petite-Patrie is crossed by various bicycle paths (street directions according to street grid, not geographical):
  - Along the Canadian Pacific railway line (North East - South West)
  - Along Saint-Dominique Street (North - South)
  - Along Drolet Street (North - South)
  - Along Boyer Street (North - South)
  - Along Marquette Street (North - South)
  - Along De la Roche Street (North - South)
  - Along Saint-Zotique Street (East - West)
  - Along Bellechasse Street (East - West)
  - Along De Lanaudiere Street (South)
  - Along Bélanger Street (East - West)

== Public services ==
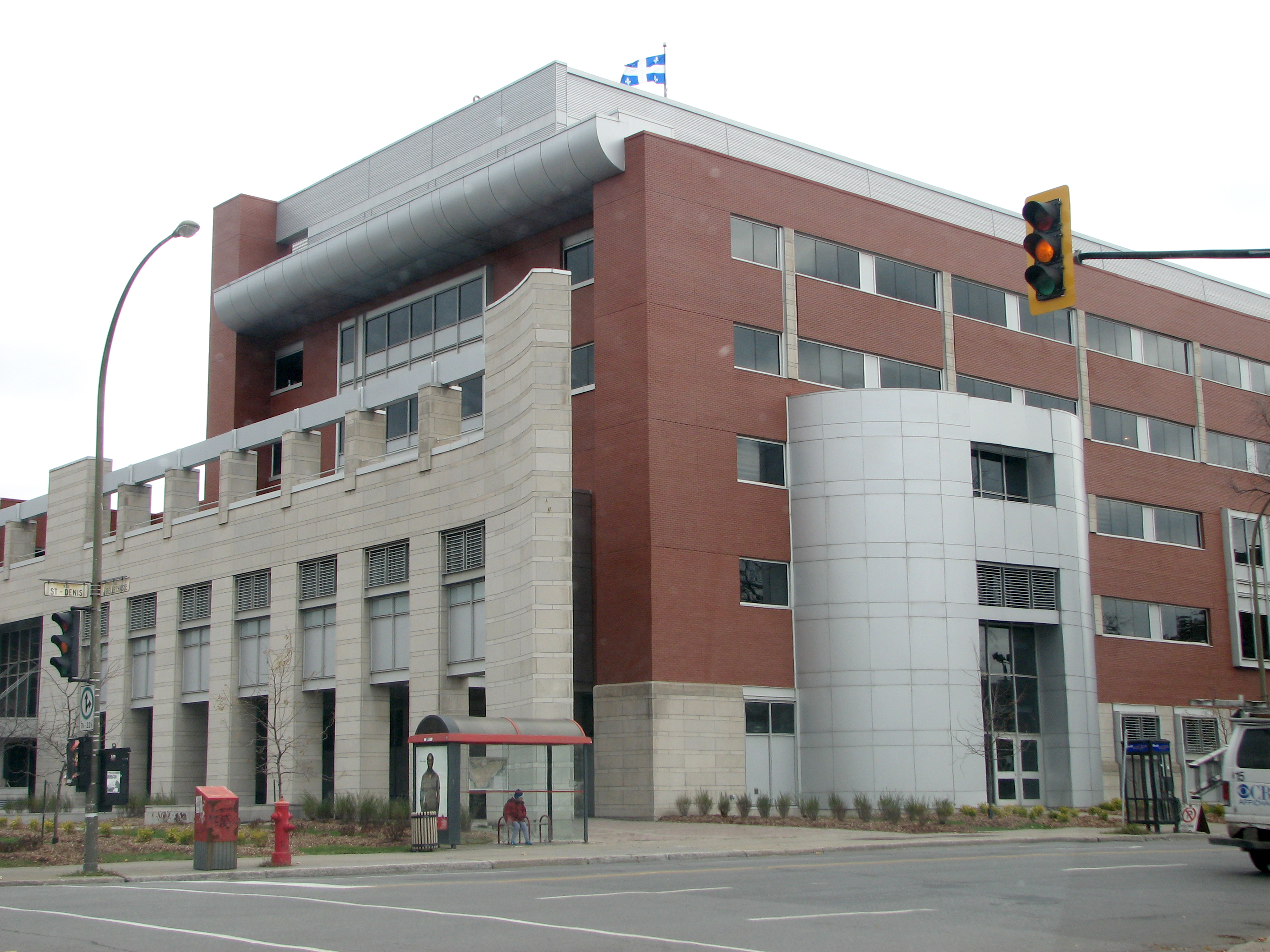
The Youth Division of the Court of Quebec located on Bellechasse Street.

- Culture
  - Théâtre Plaza
- Healthcare
  - CLSC de La Petite-Patrie
- Security and justice
  - The Youth Division of the Court of Quebec located on Bellechasse Street.

== Education ==
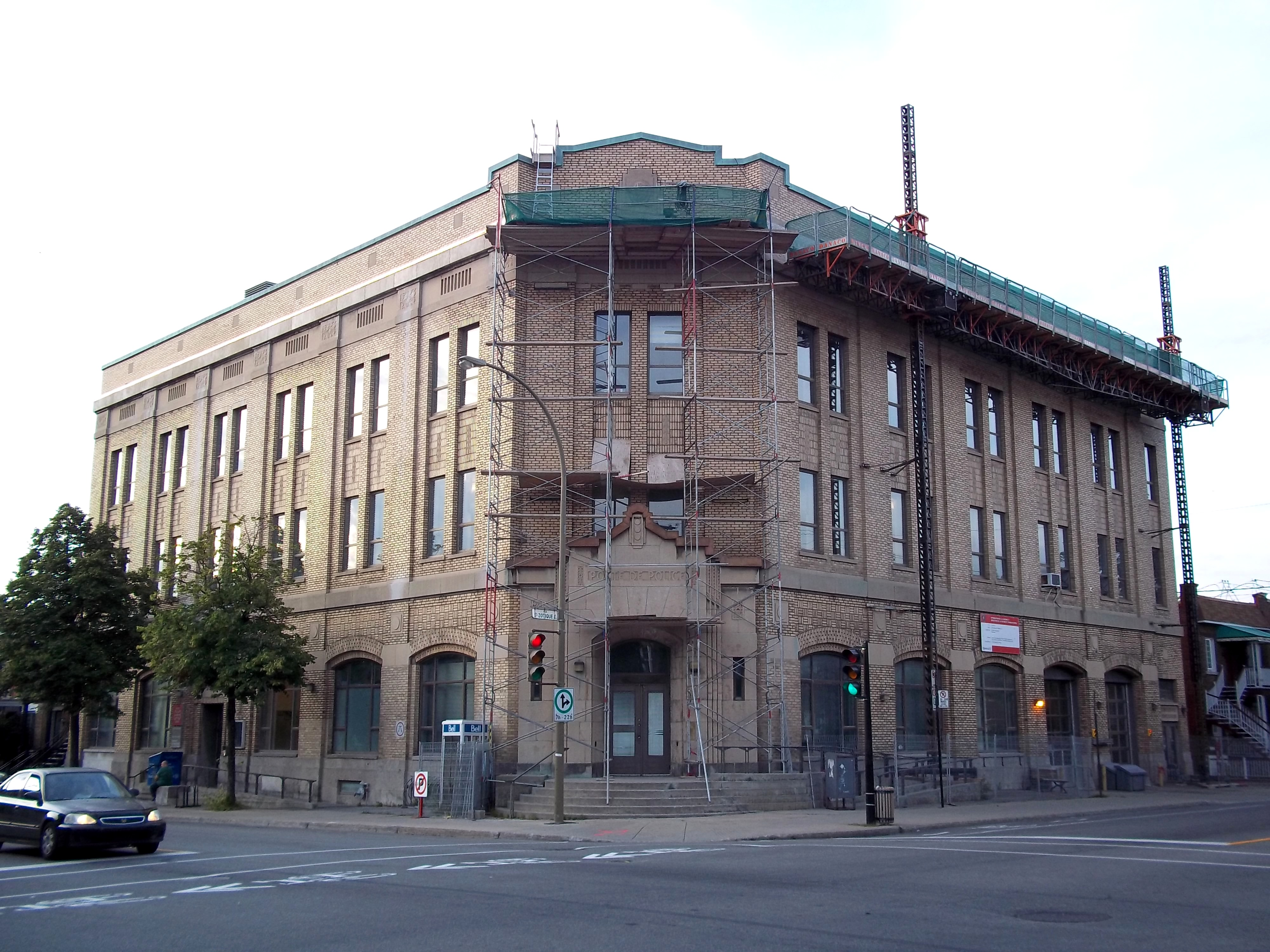
La Petite-Patrie library

The Commission scolaire de Montréal (CSDM) operates Francophone public schools.

- École secondaire Père-Marquette

The English Montreal School Board (EMSB) operates Anglophone public schools.

The Montreal Public Libraries Network operates the La Petite-Patrie library and the Bibliothèque Marc-Favreau, which opened in December 2013.

== Sports and recreation ==
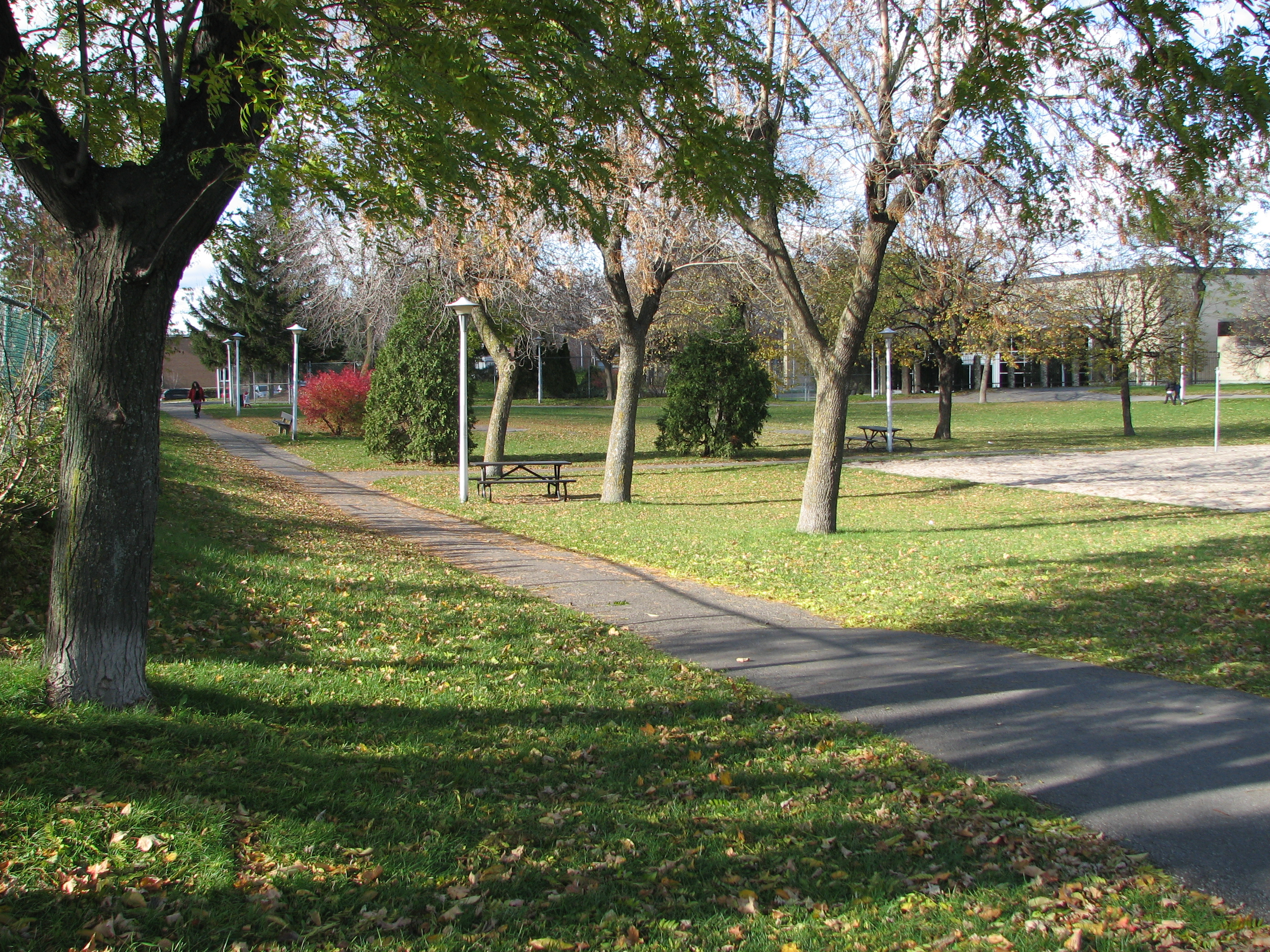
Père-Marquette Park

- Sports
  - Centre Père-Marquette (swimming pool, gymnasium, hockey rink)
  - Piscine Saint-Denis (swimming pool, on Saint-Hubert Street)
- Parks
- Père-Marquette Park has soccer and baseball fields, playground equipment, community gardens and a skatepark.

== Economy ==
- Jean-Talon Market is a large public market
- La Plaza Saint-Hubert is a shopping district located on Saint-Hubert Street between Bellechasse Street and Jean Talon Street.

== Places of worship ==
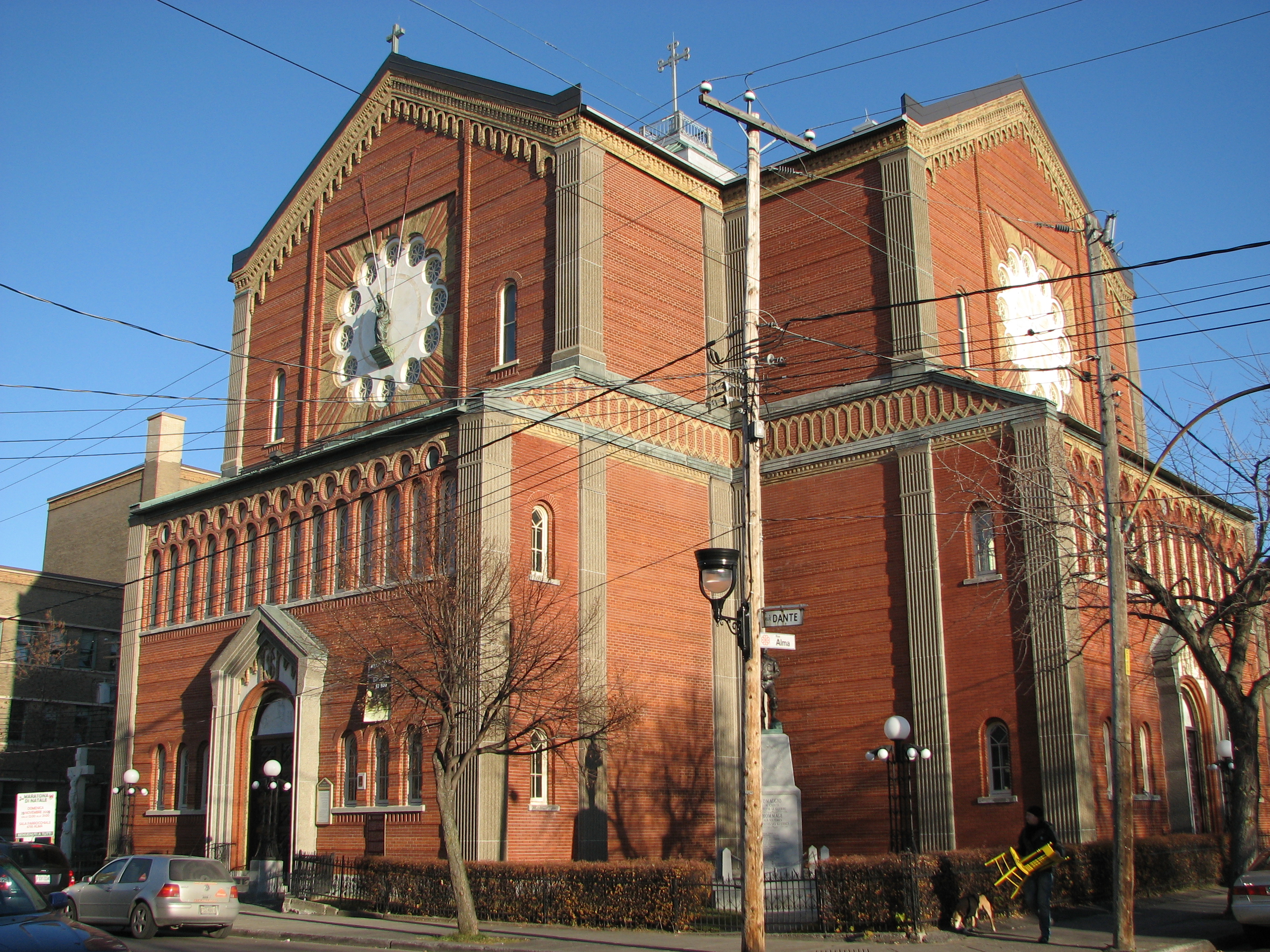
Church of the Madonna della Difesa.

- Saint-Ambroise Church
- Saint-Édouard Church
- Saint-Arsène Church
- Saint-Jean-Berchmans Church
- Church of the Madonna della Difesa (Notre-Dame-de-la-Défense Church)
