= Laurier Avenue (Montreal) =

Street in Montreal, Canada

Coordinates: 45°31′35″N 73°35′16″W

Laurier
- Interactive map of Laurier
- Native name: French: Avenue Laurier
- Location: Island of Montreal
- West end: Côte-Sainte-Catherine Road
- Major junctions: R-335 Saint Denis Street
- East end: R-125 Pie-IX Boulevard

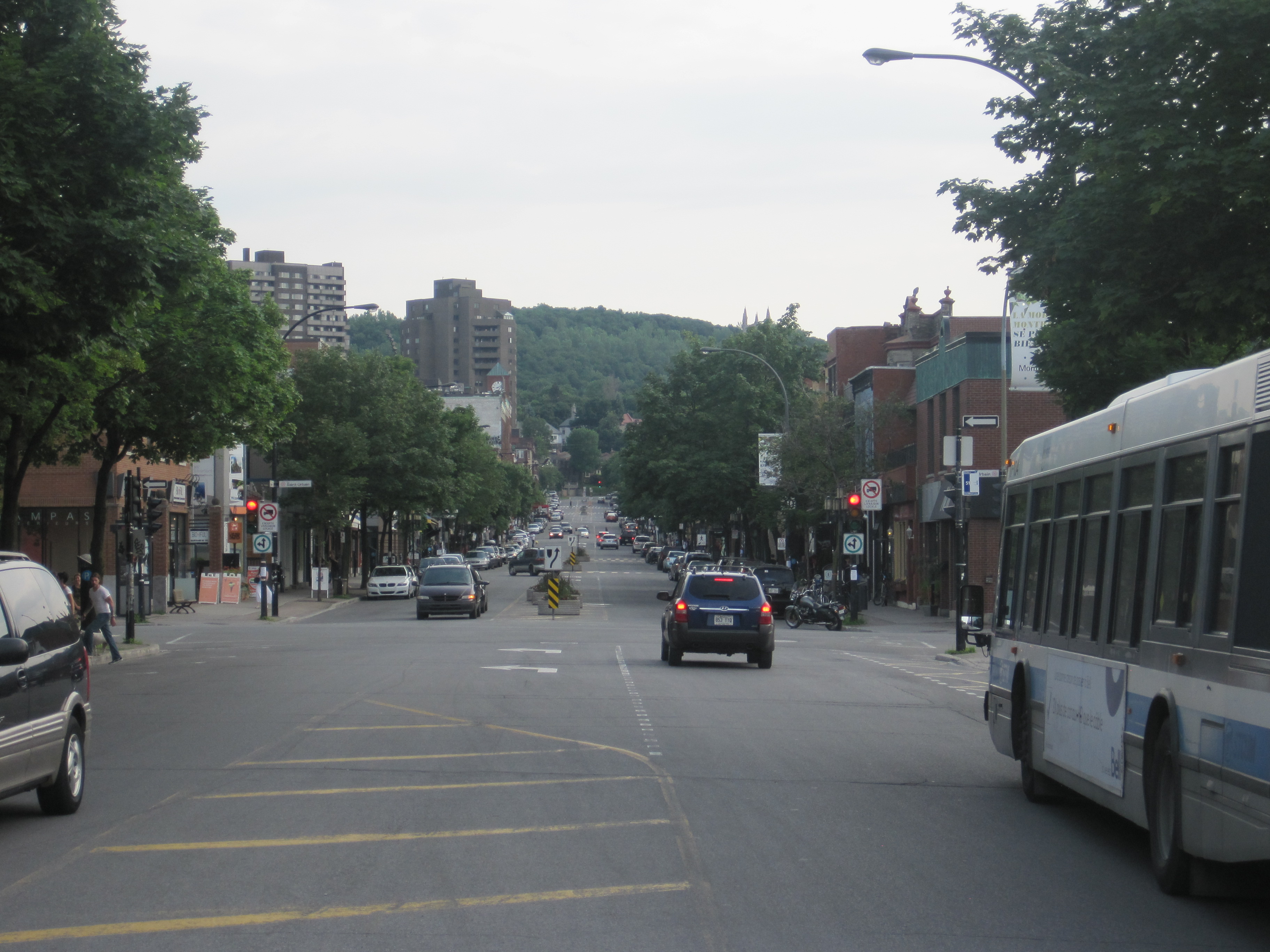
Laurier Avenue west of Saint Laurent Boulevard.

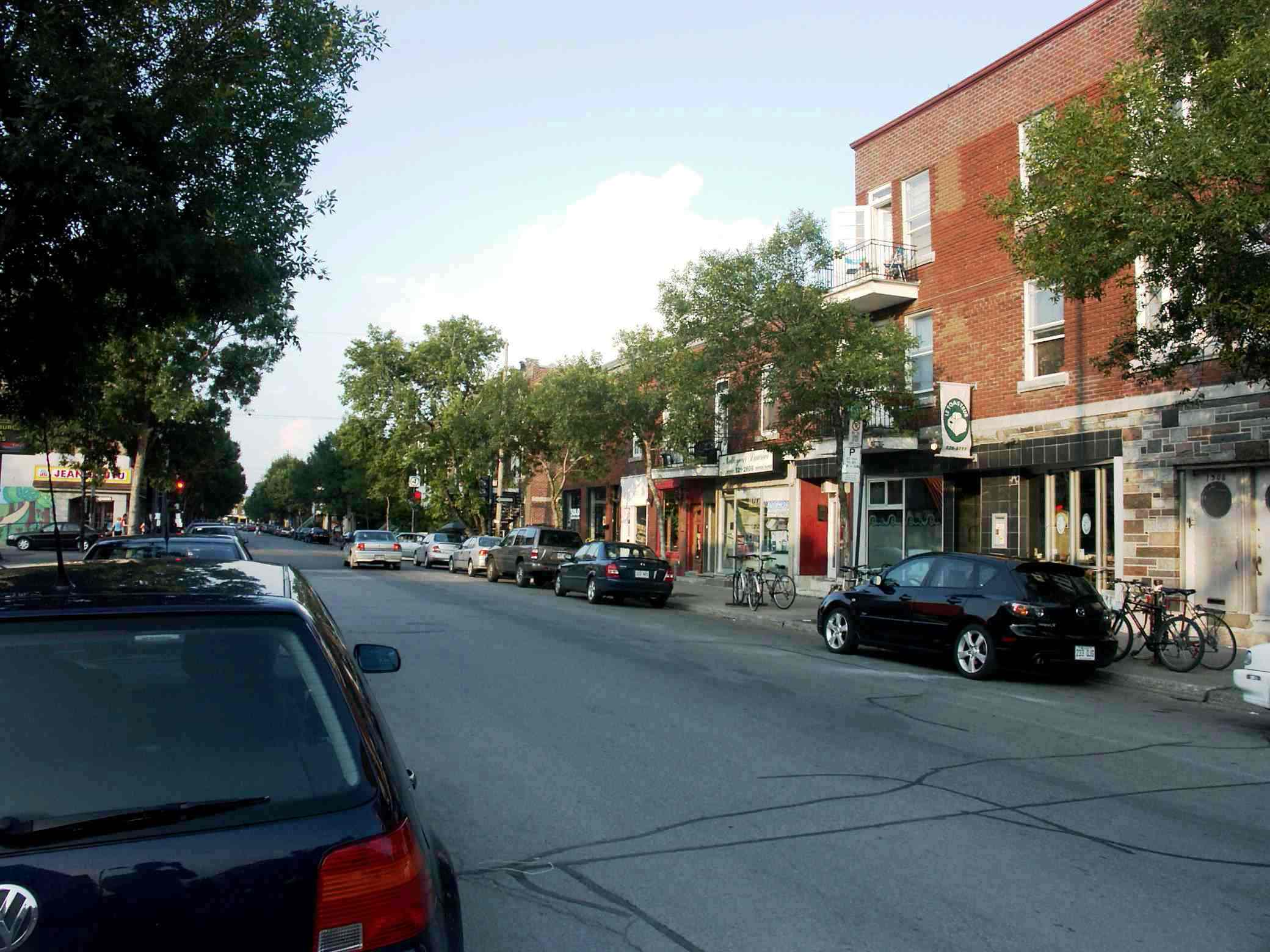
Laurier Avenue, commercial district east of Sir Wilfrid Laurier Park.

Laurier Avenue (officially in French: Avenue Laurier) is a commercial and residential street in Montreal, Quebec, Canada. It crosses the boroughs of Outremont, Le Plateau-Mont-Royal and Rosemont–La Petite-Patrie. It is known for its cafés, restaurants and specialty stores, especially near Park Avenue and east of Sir Wilfrid Laurier Park.

The largest concentration of shops on Laurier Avenue are located between Clark Street and Querbes Avenue. These are mainly upscale decorating and children's clothing stores, as well as restaurants and cafes.

Laurier Station, on the Montreal Metro's Orange Line, is located at the intersection of Laurier Avenue and Berri Street.

== History ==
Laurier Avenue was originally known as St. Louis Street, in the old village of Mile End. After the annexation of that village to the City of Montreal in 1899, it was decided that the street name should be changed to Laurier Avenue in honour of the former Prime Minister of Canada, Sir Wilfrid Laurier.
