= Sir Wilfrid Laurier Park =

Urban park in Montreal, Canada

- Parc Sir-Wilfrid-Laurier
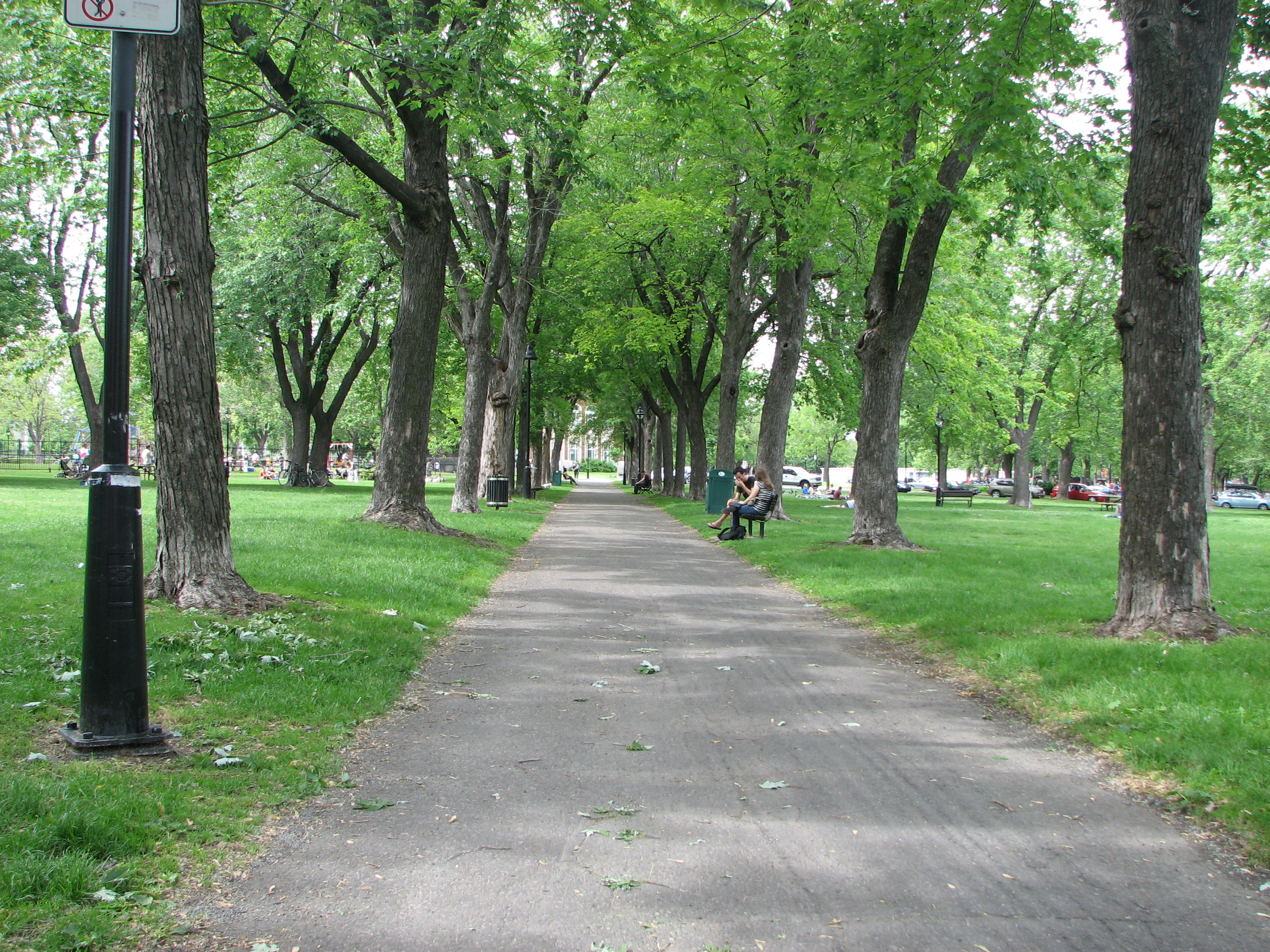
- A pathway dotted with maple trees in the park

- Location within Montreal
- Type: Urban park
- Location: Le Plateau-Mont-Royal, Montreal, Quebec, Canada
- Coordinates: 45°31′52″N 73°35′10″W
- Area: 10.8 hectares (27 acres)
- Operator: City of Montreal
- Open: 6:00 a.m. to 12:00 a.m.
- Status: Open all year
- Public transit: STM Bus: 47
- Website: Parc Sir-Wilfrid-Laurier

Sir Wilfrid Laurier Park (French: Parc Sir-Wilfrid-Laurier) is an urban park in the Le Plateau-Mont-Royal borough of Montreal, Quebec, Canada. It is bordered by Laurier Avenue East to the south, De Brébeuf Street to the east, Saint Grégoire Street to the north and De Mentana Street to the west.

It is crossed by a north–south bicycle path. The path enters the park at Brébeuf Street (corner Laurier) in the south and ends on Christophe Colomb Avenue (corner Saint Grégoire) in the north. The park's area is 10.8 hectares (27 acres).

It was named in honor of The Right Honourable Sir Wilfrid Laurier on May 29, 1925. Laurier served as Canada's seventh Prime Minister, from 11 July 1896 to 6 October 1911.

The park contains a soccer field, two baseball fields, a public swimming pool, a horseshoes sandbox, a pétanque terrain and a dog park. In the western part of the park, there is a playground with slides, swings and a sandbox for children.

The Laurier Centre, located in the heart of the park, is the location of community activities. In winter, it is used as a cottage for skaters.

== Art ==
=== Monument à Isabelle la Catholique ===
Monument à Isabelle la Catholique
- Interactive map of Monument à Isabelle la Catholique
- Location: Sir Wilfrid Laurier Park
- Designer: José Planes
- Type: Monument
- Material: bronze, granite
- Height: 2.75 metres (9.0 ft)
- Completion date: 1958
- Opening date: October 12, 1959
- Dedicated to: Queen Isabella of Castile

On October 12, 1959, the Mayor of Montreal unveiled the Monument à Isabelle la Catholique in the park. The bust of Queen Isabella of Castile (also known as Isabella the Catholic) was created by José Planes.

The bronze, copper, and granite sculpture was donated by The Consulate General of Spain to the City of Montreal on behalf of the Institute of Hispanic Culture in Madrid to mark the 467th anniversary of the discovery of the Americas by Christopher Columbus.
