= Saint-Édouard Church =

Coordinates: 45°32′04″N 73°36′18″W

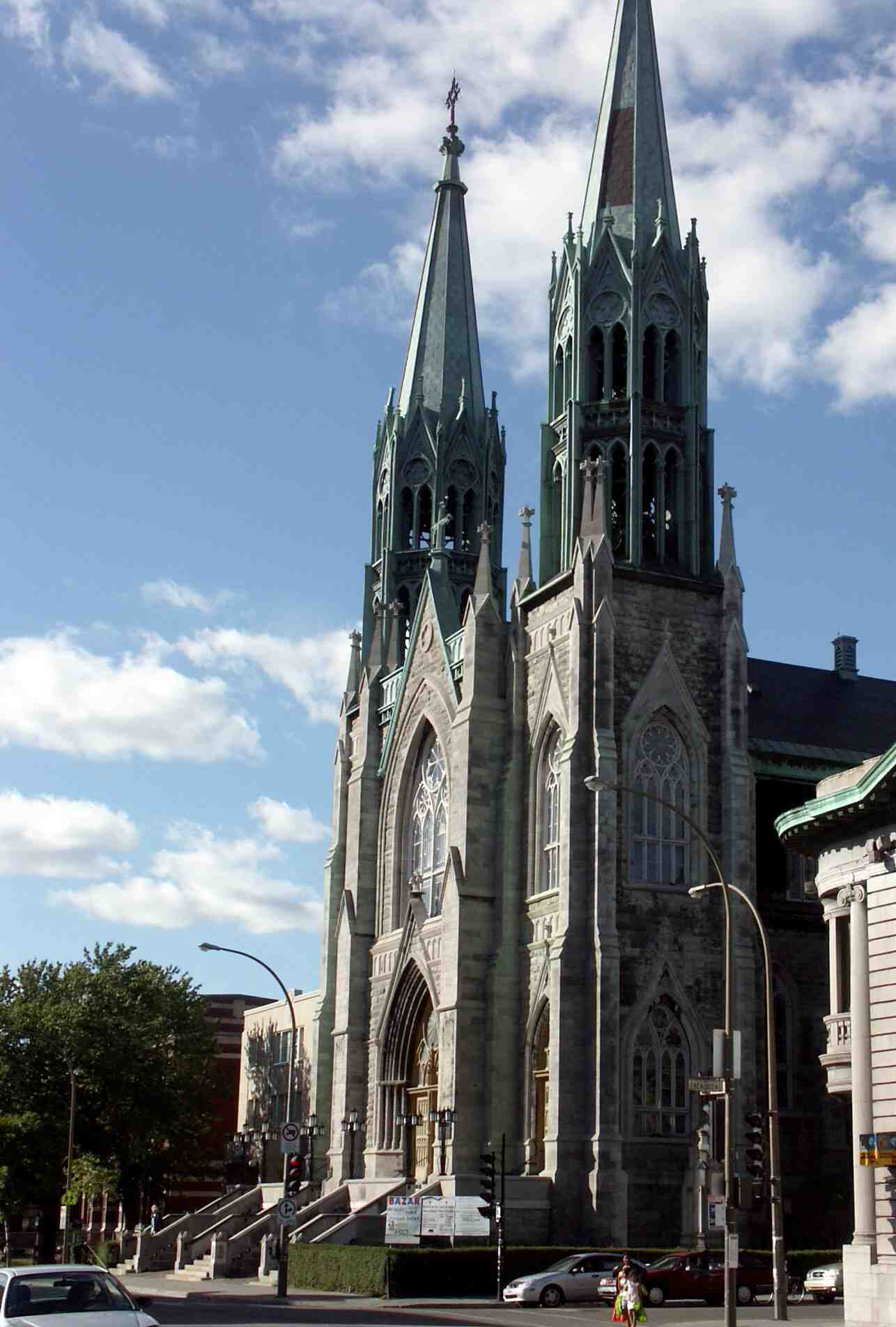
Saint-Édouard Church

Saint-Édouard Church (French: Église Saint-Édouard) is a Roman Catholic church in Montreal, Quebec, Canada. It is dedicated to Edward the Confessor, the King of England from 1047 until 1066. Its construction started in 1901 and was completed in 1909.

Its address is 6500 Saint-Vallier Street, near the intersection of Saint Denis Street and Beaubien Street.

== History ==
Montreal grew rapidly in the 1890s. Saint-Édouard parish and its church were the result. In 1895, a meeting was convened by the canon Bruchesi and the formation of a parish was requested almost unanimously. On December 14, 1895, Monsignor Édouard-Charles Fabre erected the parish and applied to the Archbishop of Montreal for the construction of a temporary Chapel on the Saint Denis Street along with the presence of a resident priest. The request was accepted and construction began. The Chapel on the rue Saint-Denis opened in May 1896. One hundred and twenty families inhabited the parish. By 1897, the parish grew to 400 families. The Saint-Denis Street chapel replied to the request a few years later due to the rapid population growth at the end of 19th century. A larger church was needed.

In 1901, the parishioners decided that the construction of a church and a Presbytery was necessary, and chose the architect Joseph-Arthur Godin to prepare the plans of the base. By 1905, the parish grew to 1,200 families. In 1906, the parishioners accepted the plans of the architect Joseph-Ovide Turgeon for the church. The construction of the church top began in 1907. The limestone was extracted from the Martineau Quarry where Père Marquette Park is now located. The church was completed in 1909. The entire front facade of the church is made up of elements of limestone. Arrows of copper sit atop the bells. The organ was built in 1913 by Casavant Frères in Saint-Hyacinthe. It has three manuals and pedals. The organ is still in very good condition. The church bells, manufactured by the Georges Pacard in Haute-Savoie, were added in 1922.

In the mid-1970, architect John Bland restored the colors and designs of the altar of celebration and the ambon in a contemporary manner.
