= Saint-Ambroise Church =

Coordinates: 45°32′21″N 73°36′03″W

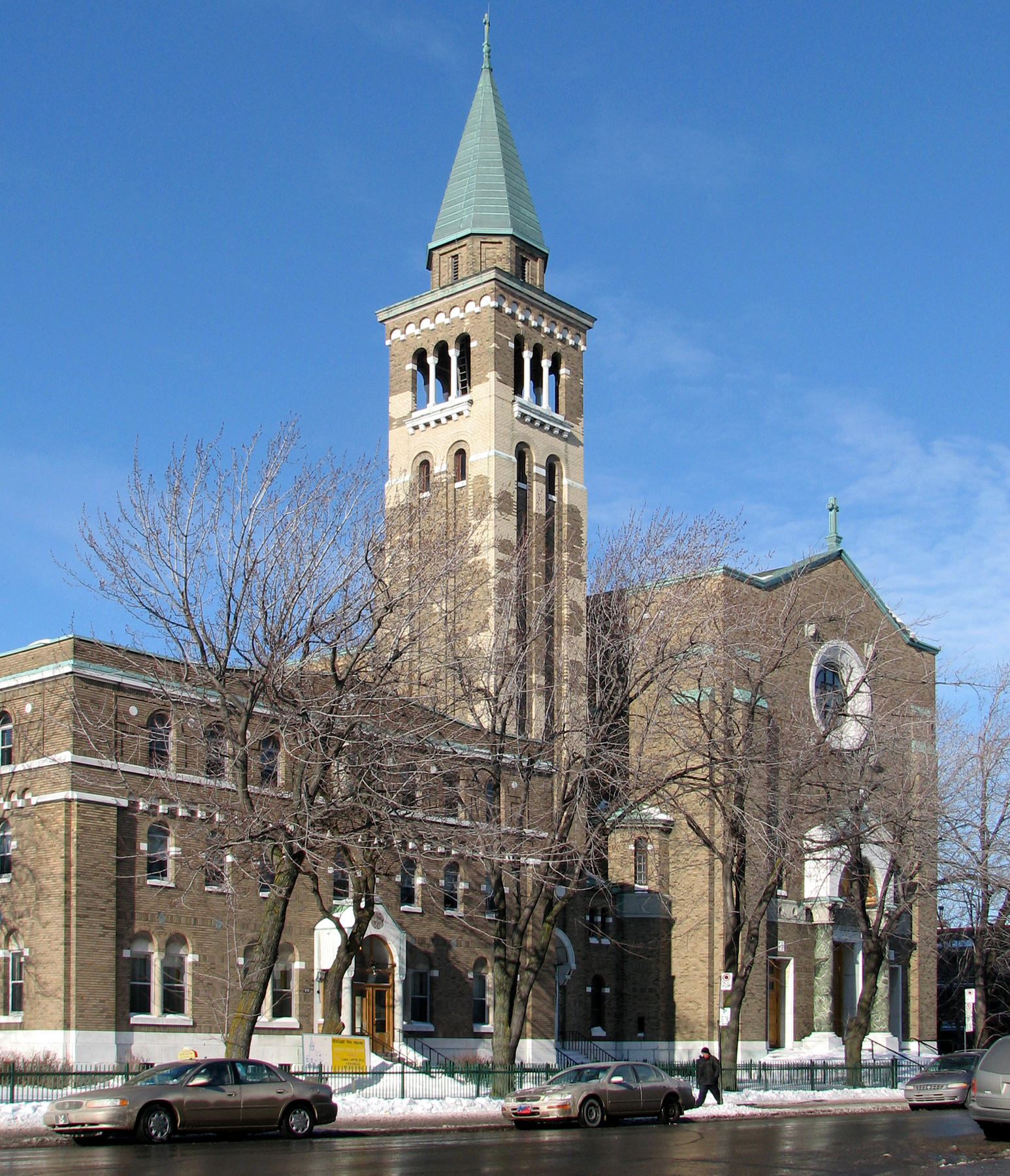
Église St-Ambroise

Saint-Ambroise Church (French: Église Saint-Ambroise) is a church in the borough of Rosemont–La Petite-Patrie in Montreal, Quebec, Canada. It is situated on Beaubien Street, between de La Roche Street et de Normanville Street.

== Architecture ==
Saint-Ambroise Church was built between 1924 and 1925. It is part of an architectural ensemble that also includes the presbytery and École Anthelme-Verreau. All three buildings were designed by Montreal architect Ernest Cormier. Also located nearby is École Saint-Ambroise which was designed by Jean-Omer Marchand.

Saint-Ambroise Church was one of the first major works by Ernest Cormier. The Church's architecture was inspired by the Pre-Roman architecture of Northern Italy, notably for the layout and the simple form of the ensemble. The belltower is reminiscent of St Mark's Campanile in Venice. The facade and the walls of the church are covered in brown brick.

== History ==
- May 26, 1923 decree of canonical erection of the parish of Saint Ambrose by Archbishop Georges Gauthier
- June 1, 1923 appointment of Father Theophilus Marshall as pastor of the parish
- June 11, 1923 formation of the body of the factory (churchwardens)
- July 1924 start of construction of the church, designed by Mr. Ernest Cormier, architect
- May 10, 1925 blessing of the cornerstone
- December 25, 1925 the first Christmas Mass
- September 16, 1927 construction of the presbytery

== Art ==
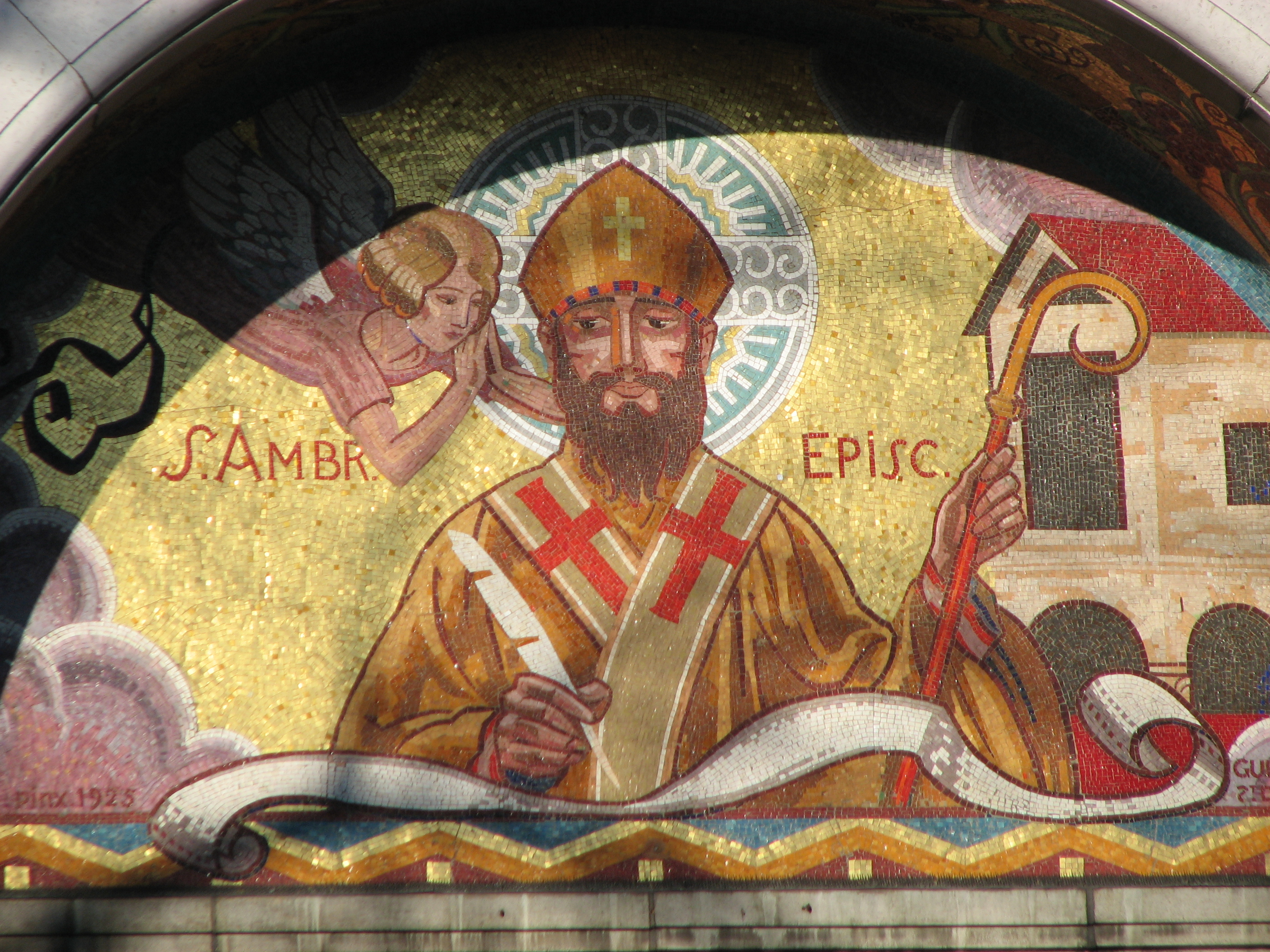

In the tympanum above the door there is an icon representing St. Ambrose of Milan dressed as a bishop with the pastoral staff and pen to write. An angel inspires with the breath in his ear what he has to write.

To understand this representation, we must know that St. Ambrose was born in Trier around 340 and died in 397, Bishop of Milan from 374 to 397, is one of the Fathers of the Latin Church. It was said of St. Ambrose it was more a theologian than a catechist, because everyone can understand what he wrote.

St. Ambrose is known as a writer and poet, and as a defender of the Church. It is one of the protagonists of debates against Arianism. It is to him that Augustine of Hippo converted to Christianity.

He is honored as a saint by the Catholic Church and celebrated on the December 7.
