= Saint-Arsène Church =

Church building in Quebec, Canada

Coordinates: 45°32′27″N 73°36′33″W

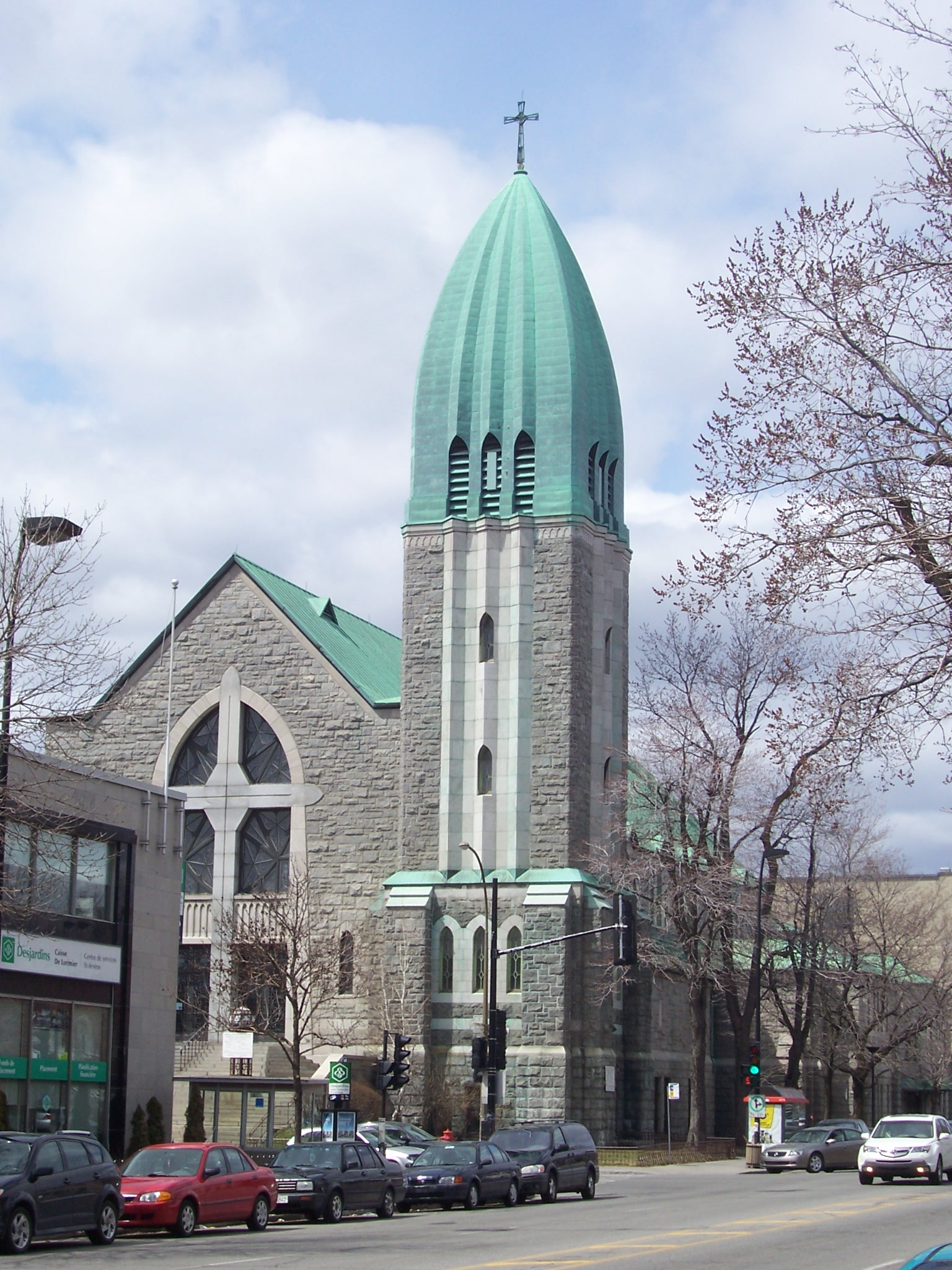
Saint-Arsène Church

Saint-Arsène Church (French: Église Saint-Arsène) is a church in the borough of Rosemont–La Petite-Patrie in Montreal. Its address is 1015 Bélanger Street, at the corner of Christophe Colomb Avenue.

Constructed in 1954 based on a design by architect Joseph-Armand Dutrisac, it distinguished itself with its ogival shaped belltower.

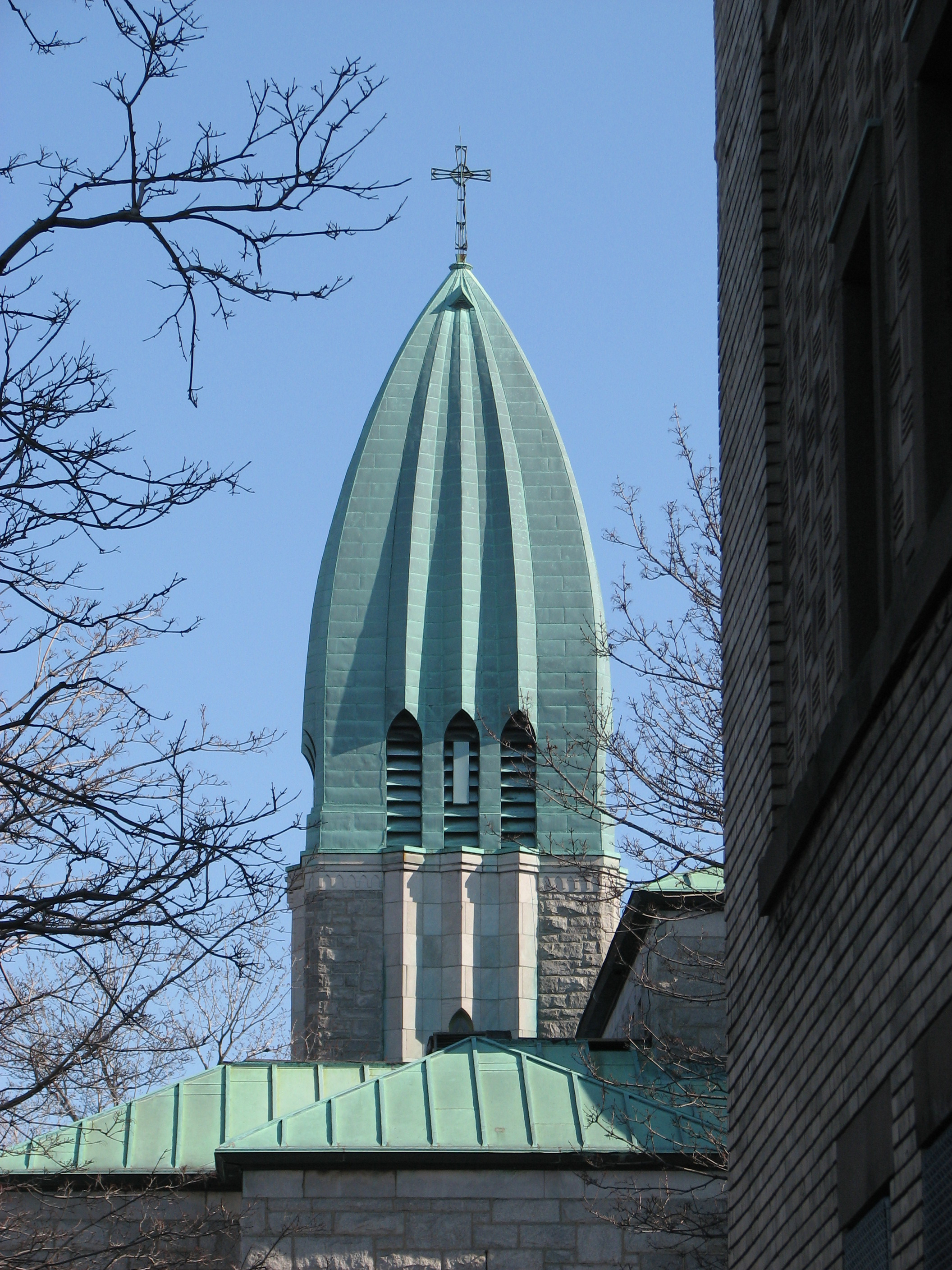
The belltower of Saint-Arsène Church.
