= Christophe Colomb Avenue =

Street in Montreal, Quebec, Canada

Coordinates: 45.5453°N 73.616°W

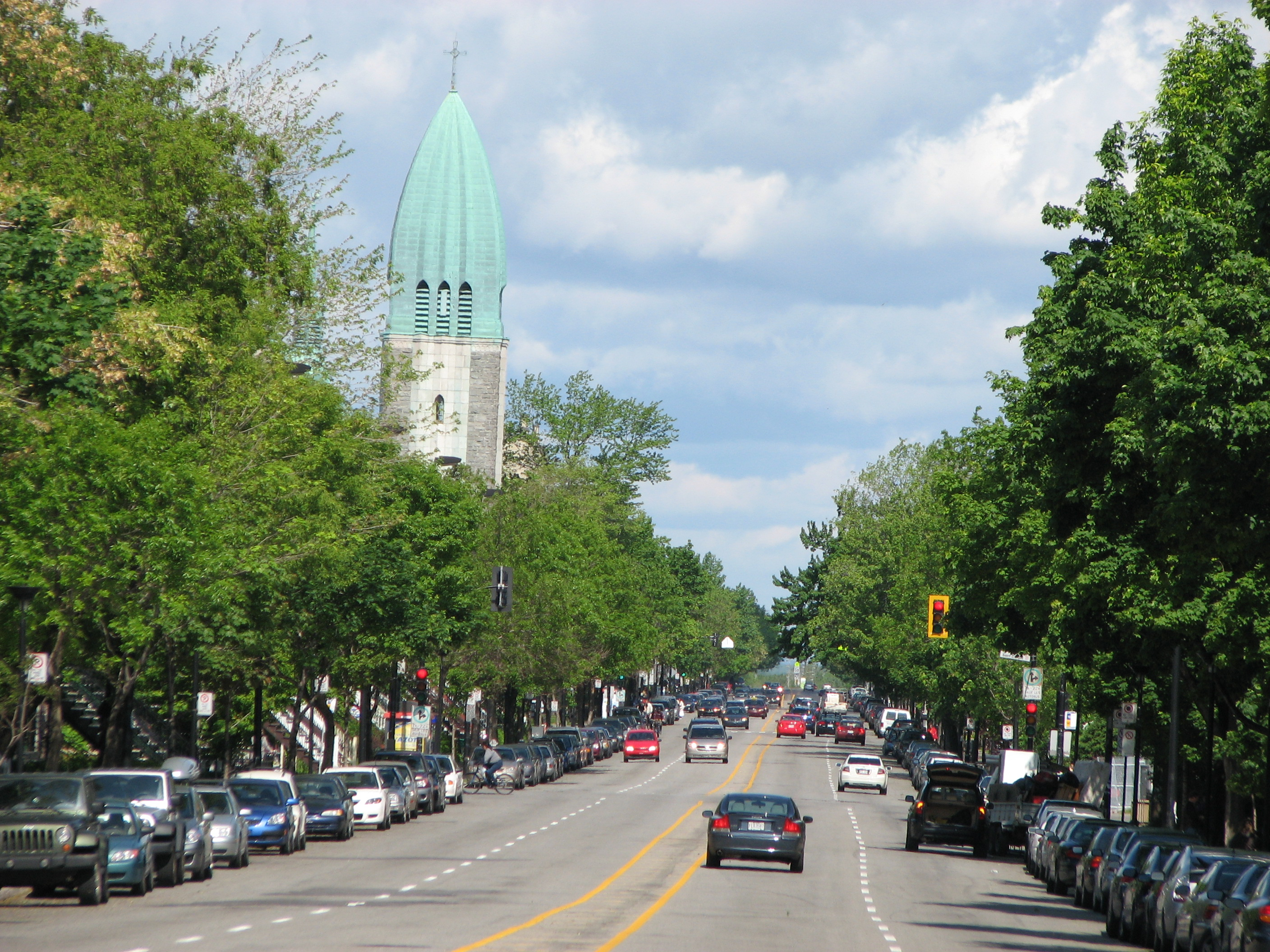
- Christophe Colomb Avenue, seen northbound, with the tower of Église St-Arsène.
- Interactive map of Christophe Colomb Avenue
- Native name: avenue Christophe-Colomb (French)
- Namesake: Christopher Colombus
- Length: 8.5 km (5.3 mi)
- Location: Montreal
- South end: Rachel Street
- Major junctions: A-40 (TCH)
- North end: Gouin Boulevard

Construction
- Inauguration: 1897

Christophe Colomb Avenue (officially in French: avenue Christophe-Colomb) is a major north–south street in Montreal, Quebec, Canada. It has a length of 8.5 kilometres (5.3 miles), and crosses the boroughs of Le Plateau-Mont-Royal, Rosemont-La Petite-Patrie, Villeray-Saint-Michel-Parc-Extension and Ahuntsic-Cartierville. The street is predominantly residential south of Villeray Street and is a large urban boulevard to the north. It is served primarily by the weekday only 13 Christophe Colomb route.

The street was named after explorer Christopher Columbus on 20 December 1897. There have been recent calls from First Nations groups to rename the street, citing Columbus's treatment of native peoples. One petition calls for reverting to the street's previous name, Des Ormes Boulevard.

Christophe Colomb Avenue begins at Rachel Street, near Lafontaine Park in the south. It is an extension of Parc Lafontaine Street. It is interrupted by Sir Wilfrid Laurier Park between Laurier Avenue and Saint Grégoire Street for distance of 400 metres. In the north, the street ends at Gouin Boulevard, near Louis Hébert Park and the Rivière des Prairies.

Bicycle lanes were added on the northern section from Gouin Boulevard to Saint-Grégoire Street in 2025, along with the first protected intersections in the city, at the intersections with Bellechasse, Sauriol and Priory Streets.

== Points of interest ==
- La Fontaine Park
- Sir Wilfrid Laurier Park
- Église Saint-Arsène
- Patro Le Prevost, sports and recreation centre
- Villeray Park
- Complexe sportif Claude-Robillard
- Boisé de Saint-Sulpice
