= Beaubien Street =

Major street in Montreal, Quebec, Canada

- Interactive map of Beaubien Street
- Native name: rue Beaubien (French)
- Length: 9.5 km (5.9 mi)
- Location: Montreal
- Coordinates: 45°32′04″N 73°36′17″W
- East end: A-25 (TCH)
- Major junctions: R-125; R-335
- West end: Durocher Avenue

Construction
- Inauguration: 1920

Beaubien Street (officially in French: rue Beaubien) is a major east-west street located in Montreal, Quebec, Canada. The street links Autoroute 25 in the east and Durocher Avenue in the west.

The street is named after Pierre Beaubien, the physician and political figure in Canada East and father of Louis Beaubien, the founder of Outremont in 1875 and deputy to the Legislative Assembly for many years.

== Transportation ==
The street is served by the 18 Beaubien bus route. The Beaubien metro station is located at the intersection of De Châteaubriand Avenue.

== See also ==
- 18 Beaubien
